= Liam Payne discography =

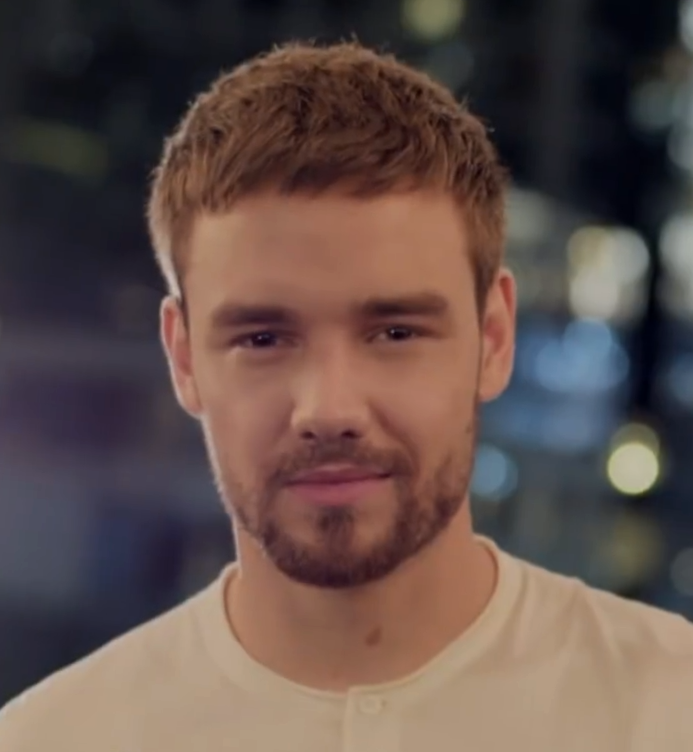
- Payne in 2018
- Studio albums: 1
- EPs: 2
- Singles: 14
- Music videos: 9

As a solo artist, English singer, songwriter and boyband One Direction member Liam Payne released one studio album, two extended plays (EPs), 14 singles, nine music videos, and one guest appearance. He was musically active from 2008 until his death in 2024.

Payne released his debut single "Strip That Down", featuring American rapper Quavo, in early 2017. The song peaked at number 3 in the United Kingdom, 2 in Australia and Ireland, 4 in New Zealand and Belgium and 10 in the United States. It was certified platinum in the UK, Germany, New Zealand and Sweden, triple platinum in the United States and quadruple in Australia, alongside a gold certification in France. His second single, a collaboration with German DJ Zedd, was certified silver in the UK. It charted in the top 50 of countries including the UK, Australia, Ireland and Sweden. His third single, "Bedroom Floor", reached number 21 in the UK and was certified silver there and gold in Australia. "For You", Payne's fourth single which features vocalist Rita Ora, was certified gold in five countries and platinum in Australia. It was included on the Fifty Shades Freed album soundtrack for the film of the same name. The song became his first number-one single after it topped the German chart, placed at number 2 in France and number 3 in Switzerland. His subsequent singles in 2018, "Familiar", "First Time" and "Polaroid", featured collaborators such as J Balvin, French Montana, and Jonas Blue, respectively. His debut EP, First Time, was released on 24 August 2018 via Capitol Records.

Payne's debut studio album, LP1, was released in December 2019. During the first three years of his solo career, Payne sold over 18 million singles, 2.4 million albums, and amassed 3.9 billion streams. In addition to his solo work, Payne produced remixes under the monikers "Big Payno" and "Payno". He collaborated with other artists and remixed tracks for both his group and singer Cheryl.

As of 2021, Payne sold more than 23 million singles and over three million albums. Payne died unexpectedly on 16 October 2024, aged 31. Payne was in the process of making his new album at the time of his death. His final single released during his lifetime, "Teardrops", was released in March 2024.

== Studio albums ==
List of studio albums, with selected details, chart positions, sales and certifications
Title	Studio album details	Peak chart positions										Sales	Certifications
Title	Studio album details	UK	AUS	BEL (FL)	CAN	FRA	GER	IRE	JPN	SWI	US	Sales	Certifications
LP1	Released: 6 December 2019; Label: Capitol; Formats: Digital download, streaming, cassette, CD, LP	17	50	82	70	153	91	69	124	100	111	US: 10,000	BPI: Gold; MC: Platinum

== Extended plays ==
Title	Details	Peak chart positions	
Title	Details	US Digital.	US Heat.
First Time	Released: 24 August 2018; Label: Capitol; Formats: Digital download, streaming	12	2
Midnight Hour (with Alesso)	Released: 9 October 2020; Label: UMG Recordings; Formats: Digital download, streaming	—	—
"—" denotes a recording that did not chart or was not released in that territory.

== Singles ==
=== As lead artist ===
List of singles as lead artist, showing year released, selected chart positions, sales, certifications, and originating album
Title	Year	Peak chart positions										Sales	Certifications	Album
Title	Year	UK	AUS	BEL (FL)	CAN	CZE Air.	GER	IRE	NLD	NZ	US	Sales	Certifications	Album
"Strip That Down" (featuring Quavo)	2017	3	2	39	11	14	10	2	28	4	10	US: 805,000	BPI: 2× Platinum; ARIA: 5× Platinum; BEA: Gold; BVMI: Platinum; MC: 7× Platinum; RIAA: 3× Platinum; RMNZ: 4× Platinum	LP1
"Get Low" (with Zedd)	2017	26	39	— (Note: "Get Low" did not enter the Ultratop Flanders chart, but peaked at number 22 on the Ultratip Flanders chart.)	50	44	75	37	— (Note: "Get Low" did not enter the Dutch Top 40, but peaked at number seven on the Tiparade chart.)	— (Note: "Get Low" did not enter the NZ Top 40 Singles Chart, but peaked at number two on the NZ Heatseeker Singles Chart.)	91	US: 61,800	BPI: Silver; ARIA: Platinum; MC: Platinum; RIAA: Gold; RMNZ: Gold	LP1
"Bedroom Floor"	2017	21	52	— (Note: "Bedroom Floor" did not enter the Ultratop Flanders chart, but peaked at number 13 on the Ultratip Flanders chart.)	63	97	100	30	— (Note: "Bedroom Floor" did not enter the Dutch Top 40, but peaked at number 12 on the Tiparade chart.)	— (Note: "Bedroom Floor" did not enter the NZ Top 40 Singles Chart, but peaked at number one on the NZ Heatseeker Singles Chart.)	98		BPI: Gold; ARIA: Gold; MC: Gold; RMNZ: Gold	LP1
"For You" (Note: "For You" also appears on LP1 and Ora's album Phoenix.) (with Rita Ora)	2018	8	15	8	63	1	1	17	21	34	76		BPI: Platinum; ARIA: 2× Platinum; BEA: Gold; BVMI: Gold; MC: Platinum; RMNZ: Platinum	Fifty Shades Freed (Original Motion Picture Soundtrack)
"Familiar" (with J Balvin)	2018	14	95	— (Note: "Familiar" did not enter the Ultratop Flanders chart, but peaked at number 23 on the Ultratip Flanders chart.)	61	59	50	22	35	— (Note: "Familiar" did not enter the NZ Top 40 Singles Chart, but peaked at number nine on the NZ Heatseeker Singles Chart.)	— (Note: "Familiar" did not enter the Billboard Hot 100, but peaked at number 19 on the Billboard Bubbling Under Hot 100 Singles chart.)		BPI: Platinum; MC: Platinum	LP1
"First Time" (with French Montana)	2018	— (Note: "First Time" did not enter the Official Singles Chart Top 100, but peaked at number 68 on the UK Singles Downloads Chart.)	—	—	—	—	—	—	— (Note: "First Time" did not enter the Dutch Top 40, but peaked at number ten on the Tiparade chart.)	— (Note: "First Time" did not enter the NZ Top 40 Singles Chart, but peaked at number 27 on the NZ Hot Singles Chart.)	—			First Time
"Polaroid" (Note: "Polaroid" also appears on LP1.) (with Jonas Blue and Lennon Stella)	2018	12	— (Note: "Polaroid" did not enter the ARIA Singles Chart, but peaked at number 25 on the ARIA Digital Track Chart.)	29	— (Note: "Polaroid" did not enter the Canadian Hot 100, but peaked at number 50 on the Canadian Digital Song Sales chart.)	— (Note: "Polaroid" did not enter the Czech Republic Rádio Top 100, but peaked at number 87 on the Czech Republic Singles Digital Top 100.)	— (Note: "Polaroid" did not enter the German Singles Chart, but peaked at number three on the German Airplay chart.)	22	20	— (Note: "Polaroid" did not enter the NZ Top 40 Singles Chart, but peaked at number 16 on the NZ Hot Singles Chart.)	—		BPI: Platinum; ARIA: Platinum; MC: Platinum; RIAA: Gold; RMNZ: Gold	Blue
"Stack It Up" (featuring A Boogie wit da Hoodie)	2019	84	—	— (Note: "Stack It Up" did not enter the Ultratop Flanders chart, but peaked at number 17 on the Ultratip Flanders chart.)	—	10	— (Note: "Stack It Up" did not enter the German Singles Chart, but peaked at number one on the German Airplay chart.)	—	— (Note: "Stack It Up" did not enter the Dutch Top 40, but peaked at number 15 on the Tiparade chart.)	— (Note: "Stack It Up" did not enter the NZ Top 40 Singles Chart, but peaked at number 10 on the NZ Hot Singles Chart.)	—		MC: Gold	LP1
"All I Want (For Christmas)"	2019	73	—	30	—	—	75	75	—	— (Note: "All I Want (For Christmas)" did not enter the NZ Top 40 Singles Chart, but peaked at number 18 on the NZ Hot Singles Chart.)	—			LP1
"Live Forever" (featuring Cheat Codes)	2019	—	—	—	—	64	—	—	—	—	—			LP1
"Naughty List" (with Dixie D'Amelio)	2020	48	—	—	—	—	—	49	—	— (Note: "Naughty List" did not enter the NZ Top 40 Singles Chart, but peaked at number 33 on the NZ Hot Singles Chart.)	—			Non-album single
"Sunshine"	2021	— (Note: "Sunshine" did not enter the Official Singles Chart Top 100, but peaked at number 80 on the UK Singles Downloads Chart.)	—	—	—	—	—	—	— (Note: "Sunshine" did not enter the Dutch Top 40, but peaked at number 23 on the Tiparade chart.)	—	—			Ron's Gone Wrong (Original Motion Picture Soundtrack)
"Teardrops"	2024	85	—	—	—	—	—	—	—	— (Note: "Teardrops" did not enter the NZ Top 40 Singles Chart, but peaked at number 31 on the NZ Hot Singles Chart.)	—			Non-album single
"—" denotes a recording that did not chart or was not released in that territory.

=== As featured artist ===
Title	Year	Peak chart positions									Sales	Certifications	Album
Title	Year	BEL (FL) Tip	CAN Digital	CZE Air.	NLD Tip	NZ Hot	RUS Air.	SWE	SWI	US Digital	Sales	Certifications	Album
"Midnight" (Alesso featuring Liam Payne)	2020	2	45	16	10	3	86	60	97	27	US: 5,000	MC: Gold; RMNZ: Platinum	LP1 (Note: "Midnight" only appears as a streaming bonus track on LP1.)

=== Promotional singles ===
Title	Year	Album
"Let It Snow, Let It Snow, Let It Snow"	2019	Non-album promotional single

== Guest appearances ==
Title	Year	Artist(s)	Album
Medley: "Your Song" / "Anywhere" / "For You" (Live at the BRITs)	2018	Rita Ora	Non-album song

== Remixes ==
Title	Year	Artist(s)
"You & I" (Big Payno Remix)	2014	One Direction
"Steal My Girl" (Big Payno & Afterhrs Pool Party Remix)	2014	One Direction
"I Don't Care" (Payno vs Aftrhrs Remix)	2014	Cheryl Cole
"Drag Me Down" (Big Payno vs Aftrhrs Remix)	2015	One Direction (featuring Lunchmoney Lewis)

== Songwriting credits ==
List of songwriting credits, with year released, artist(s), album, and references shown
Title	Year	Artist(s)	Album	Ref.
"Taken"	2011	One Direction	Up All Night	
"Everything About You"	2011	One Direction	Up All Night	
"Same Mistakes"	2011	One Direction	Up All Night	
"Last First Kiss"	2012	One Direction	Take Me Home	
"Back for You"	2012	One Direction	Take Me Home	
"Summer Love"	2012	One Direction	Take Me Home	
"Still the One"	2012	One Direction	Take Me Home	
"Irresistible"	2012	One Direction	Take Me Home	
"Story of My Life"	2013	One Direction	Midnight Memories	
"Diana"	2013	One Direction	Midnight Memories	
"Midnight Memories"	2013	One Direction	Midnight Memories	
"Right Now"	2013	One Direction	Midnight Memories	
"Through the Dark"	2013	One Direction	Midnight Memories	
"Little White Lies"	2013	One Direction	Midnight Memories	
"Better Than Words"	2013	One Direction	Midnight Memories	
"Does He Know?"	2013	One Direction	Midnight Memories	
"Steal My Girl"	2014	One Direction	Four	
"Ready to Run"	2014	One Direction	Four	
"Fool's Gold"	2014	One Direction	Four	
"Night Changes"	2014	One Direction	Four	
"No Control"	2014	One Direction	Four	
"Fireproof"	2014	One Direction	Four	
"Spaces"	2014	One Direction	Four	
"Clouds"	2014	One Direction	Four	
"Change Your Ticket"	2014	One Direction	Four	
"Illusion"	2014	One Direction	Four	
"I Won't Break"	2014	Cheryl	Only Human	
"The Night We Met"	2015	HomeTown	HomeTown	
"End of the Day"	2015	One Direction	Made in the A.M.	
"Long Way Down"	2015	One Direction	Made in the A.M.	
"What a Feeling"	2015	One Direction	Made in the A.M.	
"History"	2015	One Direction	Made in the A.M.	
"Wolves"	2015	One Direction	Made in the A.M.	
"A.M."	2015	One Direction	Made in the A.M.	
"Home"	2015	One Direction	Made in the A.M.	

== Music videos ==
Title	Year	Director
"Strip That Down" (featuring Quavo)	2017	Emil Nava
"Get Low" (with Zedd)	2017	Andrew Donoho
"Bedroom Floor"	2017	Declan Whitebloom
"For You" (with Rita Ora)	2018	Hannah Lux Davis
"Familiar" (with J Balvin)	2018	Marc Klasfeld
"First Time" (featuring French Montana)	2018	Phillip R. Lopez
"Polaroid" (with Jonas Blue and Lennon Stella)	2018	Jay Martin
"Stack It Up" (featuring A Boogie wit da Hoodie)	2019	Nathan R. Smith
"Live Forever" (featuring Cheat Codes)	2019	Similar But Different
"Naughty List" (featuring Dixie D'Amelio)	2021	Isaac Rentz
"Sunshine"	2021	Aya Tanimura
