= Love, Me (EP) =

2018 EP by Lennon Stella

EP by Lennon Stella
- Released: November 16, 2018
- Length: 16:51
- Label: Columbia
- Producer: Lennon Stella (exec.); Erin McCarley; Busbee; Sam de Jong; Stint; Joel Little; Greg Kurstin

Lennon Stella chronology
| Love, Me (2018) | Three. Two. One. (2020) |

Singles from Love, Me
- 1. "Bad" Released: September 14, 2018; 2. "Breakaway" Released: October 31, 2018; 3. "La Di Da" Released: November 16, 2018; 4. "Feelings" Released: December 12, 2018

Love, Me (stylized in sentence case) is the debut extended play (EP) by Canadian singer Lennon Stella. The EP was released on November 16, 2018 by Columbia Records. Stella collaborated with six musicians during the production of Love, Me, including American producer Greg Kurstin and New Zealand producer Joel Little. Four tracks were issued as singles from the EP: "Bad", "Breakaway", "La Di Da", and "Feelings". Love, Me follows Stella's appearance on the song "Polaroid" with English producer Jonas Blue and One Direction vocalist Liam Payne.

== Track listing ==
Love, Me track listing
| No. | Title | Writer(s) | Producer(s) | Length |
|---|---|---|---|---|
| 1. | "Bad" | Lennon Stella; Kennedi Lykken | Erin McCarley; Busbee | 2:58 |
| 2. | "Breakaway" | Stella; Jarryd James; Kate York | Sam de Jong | 3:46 |
| 3. | "Feelings" | Stella; Ajay Bhattacharya; Hayley Gene Penner | Stint | 3:44 |
| 4. | "La Di Da" | Stella; Emily Warren | Joel Little | 3:29 |
| 5. | "Fortress" | Stella; Maureen McDonald | Greg Kurstin | 2:54 |
| Total length: | | | | 16:51 |

== Charts ==
| Chart (2018) | Peak position |
|---|---|
| Canadian Albums (Billboard) | 60 |
