= Vai Malandra =

2017 song by Anitta

Single by Anitta, Zaac and Maejor featuring Tropkillaz and DJ Yuri Martins
- Language: Portuguese; English
- Released: December 18, 2017
- Recorded: 2017
- Genre: Funk carioca; trap
- Length: 3:21
- Label: Warner Brasil
- Songwriters: Isaac Daniel Júnior; Larissa Machado; Brandon Green
- Producers: Tropkillaz; DJ Yuri Martins

Anitta singles chronology
"Downtown" (2017)	"Vai Malandra" (2017)	"Machika" (2018)

Zaac singles chronology
"Tribo das Danadas" (2017)	"Vai Malandra" (2017)	"Kika" (2018)

Maejor singles chronology
"Intuition" (2017)	"Vai Malandra" (2017)	"Rebeca" (2018)

Tropkillaz singles chronology
"Murder" (2017)	"Vai Malandra" (2017)	"Milk & Honey" (2018)

DJ Yuri Martins singles chronology
"Tchau tchau Mozão" (2017)	"Vai Malandra" (2017)

Music video
- "Vai Malandra" on YouTube

"Vai Malandra" (transl. "Go Sassy Girl") is a song by Brazilian singer Anitta with fellow Brazilian singer Zaac and American rapper Maejor. The song features Brazilian producers Tropkillaz and DJ Yuri Martins. It was released as a single on December 18, 2017 and as the conclusion to Anitta's Check Mate project, where she releases a new song each month.

== Background ==
In 2011, funk carioca producer Batutinha invited Anitta for an audition after he saw one of her videos singing. After being approved, she signed with Furacão 2000, one of the biggest producing companies of funk carioca in Brazil. In the same year, he released his first song on radio stations in Rio de Janeiro – the promotional single "Eu Vou Ficar". In early 2012, she created the "quadradinho" choreography, which was very successful among funk groups. In June 2012, producer Kamilla Fialho, after watching a performance on stage by Anitta, offered to be her manager, paying a fee of 256,000 reais required to release the singer from her contract with Furacão 2000, later signing her to Kamilas's company K2L. In January 2013, after the success of the song "Meiga e Abusada" in Rio de Janeiro, Anitta signed a recording contract with Warner Music Group. Following that, Anitta began her career as a pop star in Brazil; however, she continued to incorporate funk carioca's elements on her next releases.

In August 2017, Anitta was seen shooting a music video for an unspecified track in the favelas of Rio de Janeiro in Brazil. The song was later announced to be titled "Vai Malandra", a collaboration with Zaac, Maejor, DJ Yuri Martins and Tropkillaz; however no release date was given at that time.

In the following days, Anitta announced a project entitled Check Mate, which consists of the release of a new song in English, Spanish or Portuguese along with its accompanying music video. She launched the project with the premiere of Poo Bear-produced "Will I See You", which became her first single in English as a main artist. By October, she had ventured into EDM by releasing the single "Is That for Me", a collaboration with Swedish DJ Alesso. For the November Check Mate release, Anitta collaborated with Colombian singer J Balvin on the Latin pop single "Downtown". Anitta later announced that "Vai Malandra" would be the "checkmate" move and conclude her Check Mate project.

== Recording and composition ==
"Vai Malandra"
Sample of 29 seconds of "Vai malandra".

An earlier draft of "Vai Malandra" was initially written by Zaac and presented to Anitta in 2017. She loved the track and decided to add her own part; the duo were joined in the studio by producer DJ Yuri Martins. Immediately after the three of them finished an initial version of the lyrics, they began working on a demo for the song. Anitta later suggested the inclusion of a few new elements from genres such as hip hop and trap music to the song, to this end inviting producer duo Tropkillaz and American rapper Maejor to work with them on the track. According to Anitta, her decision to include such elements was to extend the song's "expiration date". Despite its title in Portuguese and being sung primarily in that language, the song also features rap verses performed in English by Maejor.

== Release ==
The song was officially released worldwide to online retailers and streaming services on December 18, 2017. "Vai Malandra" received more than one million plays on Spotify on its first day of release and broke the record for the most streams received in a day in Brazil – held previously by Taylor Swift's "Look What You Made Me Do". On its second day of release, the song was played more than two million times, surpassing the record for the most streamed song in a day in Brazil. Due to the amount of streams received on its first days of release, the song debuted on the Global Top 50 chart in Spotify and became the first song in Portuguese to hit the top 20 on that chart on December 20, 2017. Anitta also became the first Brazilian to chart two songs simultaneously on the Global Top 50 chart with "Vai Malandra" and her previous single "Downtown".

== Music video ==
Anitta and extras in multiple shots of the music video

=== Filming and production ===
The official music video was shot by director Terry Richardson in Rio de Janeiro on August 20, 2017. The shooting of the video took around 30 hours and was composed of about 120 people, including camera men, producers, and extras. About 60 of the extras were residents of the Vidigal favela, who were hired exclusively for the shooting. Anitta chose to shoot the video in the Vidigal favela because she wanted to present part of what funk carioca, baile funk, its beats, and its universe is to global audiences. When asked about the video, Anitta stated she's "very happy with the result of 'Vai Malandra'. It's a video to showcase [her] roots. [She] came from the favela and enjoyed the sun on the slab, the dances and all of that joy. [She is] an interpreter of funk carioca and [she] defends [her] culture with pride".

=== Concept and costumes ===
The concept of the video lies in the exploration of baile funk and its culture, featuring Anitta singing and dancing in a favela, as well as sunbathing on the slab. She is joined by Zaac and Maejor in multiple shots. According to Anitta, she wanted to showcase the sensuality of Brazilian women and their beauty. She also added that "[she] was able to have the opportunity to show what [her] origins were in [the] video, a little bit of what [she] experienced where [she] lived". She claimed that "sunning on the roof, baile funk, moto-taxis and joy" were all part of her life when she used to live in the favelas.

The costumes used by Anitta were inspired by what is worn by the girls that live in the Vidigal favela community, which includes a bikini made of insulating tape: a tradition in the favelas used to create "the perfect body tan". It also features a mix of clothing from the C&A department store — the singer's sponsor in the Check Mate project — with other elements created by stylists for the singer. Anitta believed that they "made a good mix" as she "tried to be faithful to the style of the girls giving a more editorial and conceptual look to every proposal".

=== Release and reception ===
The video was originally slated to premiere in September 2017, however it was postponed due to Anitta's rollout of her idea for the Check Mate project and due to several reported accusations of sexual harassment involving director Terry Richardson in international press. After learning about the charges, Anitta consulted with her lawyers to see what could have been done regarding Richardson's involvement in the video. She initially considered cancelling the video's release, not wanting to be associated with the controversy. However, she later decided to release it out of respect to the many other professionals involved in the making of the video.

The music video for "Vai Malandra" was officially released on Anitta's YouTube channel on December 18, 2017, following a series of promo teasers. Prior to the release of the video, Anitta made a live stream on her YouTube channel, hosted by Didi Wagner, who discussed the music video with Anitta and also interviewed the people involved in its making. The live stream gathered more than 100,000 viewers. After its release, the video received over 15 million views within 24 hours on YouTube, becoming the Brazilian video with the most views in one day on YouTube and also the fastest Brazilian video to receive one million likes, breaking the record previously held by Pabllo Vittar's "Corpo Sensual".

The video received mixed reactions from Brazilian media. Anitta's choice to not tune her body using video editing software and openly showcase her cellulite received acclaim. The music video was also praised for illustrating the essence of baile funk and favelas with credibility. In addition, Anitta received acclaim for her choice to return to her roots for the video and support funk carioca music and the women represented in the video. The Traffic Department of Rio de Janeiro (DETRAN) also praised Anitta for wearing a helmet in the video while riding a motorcycle. However, the video received criticism due to its exaggerated sexualization and for Richardson's involvement. Anitta was also accused of cultural appropriation and "using blackness when it is convenient" because of her braids in the video.

== Track listing ==
Digital download

1. "Vai Malandra" – 3:21

== Charts ==
=== Weekly charts ===
Chart (2017–2018)	Peak position
Brazil (Billboard Hot 100)	24
Brazil Hot Pop Songs (Billboard)	1
Brazil Hot Streaming (Pro-Música Brasil)	1
Paraguay (Monitor Latino)	9
Portugal (AFP)	4
Portugal Digital Songs (Billboard)	2

=== Year-end charts ===
Chart (2018)	Position
Portugal (AFP)	12

== Certifications ==
Region	Certification	Certified units/sales
Portugal (AFP)	3× Platinum	30,000^{‡}
^{‡} Sales+streaming figures based on certification alone.

== Credits and personnel ==
- Vocals – Anitta, MC Zaac, Maejor
- Songwriting – Isaac Daniel Júnior, Larissa Machado, Brandon Green
- Production – DJ Yuri Martins, Tropkillaz
