= Stay (Zedd and Alessia Cara song) =

2017 single by Zedd and Alessia Cara

Single by Zedd and Alessia Cara

from the album Stay +
- Released: 23 February 2017
- Recorded: December 2016
- Genre: EDM; dance-pop
- Length: 3:30
- Label: Interscope; Def Jam
- Songwriters: Linus Wiklund; Sarah Aarons; Anders Frøen; Alessia Caracciolo; Anton Zaslavski; Jonnali Parmenius
- Producers: Zedd; Lotus IV

Zedd singles chronology
"Ignite" (2016)	"Stay" (2017)	"Get Low" (2017)

Alessia Cara singles chronology
"How Far I'll Go" (2016)	"Stay" (2017)	"1-800-273-8255" (2017)

Music video
- "Stay" on YouTube

"Stay" is a song by Russian-German electronic music producer Zedd and Canadian singer-songwriter Alessia Cara. The single was released on 23 February 2017 through Interscope Records, and is also featured on the Japanese edition of Cara's second studio album, The Pains of Growing. The official music video was released on YouTube on 18 April 2017. Commercially, the song reached the top ten in ten countries, including the United States and the United Kingdom. It is certified Platinum or higher in seventeen countries.

== Composition ==
"Stay" is a dance-pop song influenced by contemporary R&B performed in the key of F minor in common time with a tempo of 102 beats per minute. It follows a chord progression of D♭–F5–E♭, and Cara's vocals span from F_{3} to D♭_{5}. The song introduction contain a sample from Banks's 2016 track "Poltergeist".

== Music videos ==
A lyric video for "Stay" was released on February 23, 2017, and has over 560 million views as of October 2025.

A music video for "Stay" directed by Tim Mattia was released on April 18, 2017, and has 124 million views as of October 2025.

== Chart performance ==
"Stay" peaked at number seven on the Billboard Hot 100 and number one on the Mainstream Top 40, becoming both Zedd and Cara's third top ten song on the chart.

== Track listing ==
Digital download
No.	Title	Length
1.	"Stay"	3:30

Digital download – acoustic
No.	Title	Length
1.	"Stay" (Acoustic)	3:15

Digital download – remixes EP
No.	Title	Length
1.	"Stay" (Petit Biscuit Remix)	4:01
2.	"Stay" (The Kemist Remix)	3:36
3.	"Stay" (Jonas Blue Remix)	4:26
4.	"Stay" (Lophiile Remix)	3:23
5.	"Stay" (Yasutaka Nakata Remix)	4:30
6.	"Stay" (Tritonal Remix)	3:48

CD single
No.	Title	Length
1.	"Get Low" (Zedd and Liam Payne)	3:24
2.	"Stay" (Zedd and Alessia Cara)	3:30

== Charts ==
=== Weekly charts ===
Weekly chart performance for "Stay"
Chart (2017)	Peak position
Australia (ARIA)	3
Australia Dance (ARIA)	1
Austria (Ö3 Austria Top 40)	6
Belgium (Ultratop 50 Flanders)	21
Belgium (Ultratop 50 Wallonia)	30
Canada Hot 100 (Billboard)	9
Colombia (National-Report)	54
Czech Republic Airplay (ČNS IFPI)	10
Czech Republic Singles Digital (ČNS IFPI)	7
Denmark (Tracklisten)	12
Finland (Suomen virallinen lista)	20
France (SNEP)	38
Germany (GfK)	13
Hungary (Rádiós Top 40)	25
Hungary (Single Top 40)	34
Hungary (Stream Top 40)	6
Ireland (IRMA)	8
Italy (FIMI)	21
Italian Airplay (EarOne)	68
Japan Hot 100 (Billboard)	27
Malaysia (RIM)	6
Mexico Airplay (Billboard)	22
Netherlands (Dutch Top 40)	8
Netherlands (Single Top 100)	11
New Zealand (Recorded Music NZ)	9
Norway (VG-lista)	17
Portugal (AFP)	11
Romania (Airplay 100)	48
Scottish Singles Sales (Official Charts)	7
Slovakia Airplay (ČNS IFPI)	54
Slovakia Singles Digital (ČNS IFPI)	10
Spain (PROMUSICAE)	40
Sweden (Sverigetopplistan)	9
Switzerland (Schweizer Hitparade)	16
UK Singles (Official Charts)	8
UK Dance (Official Charts)	3
US Billboard Hot 100	7
US Adult Contemporary (Billboard)	7
US Adult Pop Airplay (Billboard)	2
US Dance Club Songs (Billboard)	24
US Hot Dance/Electronic Songs (Billboard)	1
US Pop Airplay (Billboard)	1
US Rhythmic Airplay (Billboard)	12

=== Year-end charts ===
Year-end chart performance for "Stay"
Chart (2017)	Position
Australia (ARIA)	14
Austria (Ö3 Austria Top 40)	31
Belgium (Ultratop Flanders)	52
Belgium (Ultratop Wallonia)	81
Brazil (Pro-Música Brasil)	97
Canada (Canadian Hot 100)	22
Denmark (Tracklisten)	38
France (SNEP)	92
Germany (Official German Charts)	57
Hungary (Stream Top 40)	19
Italy (FIMI)	63
Japan (Japan Hot 100)	66
Latvia Airplay (LaIPA)	11
Netherlands (Dutch Top 40)	46
Netherlands (Single Top 100)	33
New Zealand (Recorded Music NZ)	29
Portugal (AFP)	39
Spain (PROMUSICAE)	92
Sweden (Sverigetopplistan)	42
Switzerland (Schweizer Hitparade)	52
UK Singles (Official Charts Company)	37
US Billboard Hot 100	17
US Adult Contemporary (Billboard)	16
US Adult Top 40 (Billboard)	12
US Hot Dance/Electronic Songs (Billboard)	3
US Mainstream Top 40 (Billboard)	3
US Rhythmic (Billboard)	50
Chart (2018)	Position
Japan (Japan Hot 100)	87
US Adult Contemporary (Billboard)	14
US Hot Dance/Electronic Songs (Billboard)	12

=== Decade-end charts ===
Decade-end chart performance for "Stay"
Chart (2010–2019)	Position
US Hot Dance/Electronic Songs (Billboard)	11

== Certifications ==
Certifications for "Stay"
Region	Certification	Certified units/sales
Australia (ARIA)	7× Platinum	490,000^{‡}
Austria (IFPI Austria)	Gold	15,000^{‡}
Belgium (BRMA)	Platinum	20,000^{‡}
Brazil (Pro-Música Brasil)	Diamond	250,000^{‡}
Canada (Music Canada)	8× Platinum	640,000^{‡}
Denmark (IFPI Danmark)	Platinum	90,000^{‡}
France (SNEP)	Diamond	333,333^{‡}
Germany (BVMI)	Platinum	400,000^{‡}
Italy (FIMI)	2× Platinum	100,000^{‡}
Japan (RIAJ)	Gold	100,000^{*}
Mexico (AMPROFON)	2× Platinum+Gold	150,000^{‡}
New Zealand (RMNZ)	4× Platinum	120,000^{‡}
Poland (ZPAV)	Platinum	50,000^{‡}
Portugal (AFP)	Platinum	10,000^{‡}
Spain (Promusicae)	Platinum	40,000^{‡}
Sweden (GLF)	2× Platinum	80,000^{‡}
United Kingdom (BPI)	2× Platinum	1,200,000^{‡}
United States (RIAA)	6× Platinum	6,000,000^{‡}
Streaming
Japan (RIAJ)	Platinum	100,000,000^{†}
^{*} Sales figures based on certification alone.^{‡} Sales+streaming figures based on certification alone.^{†} Streaming-only figures based on certification alone.

== Riri version ==
"Stay" (covered by Riri)

Single by Zedd and Riri

from the album Neo
- Language: English; Japanese
- Released: 20 June 2018
- Genre: EDM; dance-pop
- Length: 3:19
- Label: Interscope; Sony Music Associated Records
- Songwriters: Linus Wiklund; Sarah Aarons; Anders Frøen; Alessia Caracciolo; Anton Zaslavski; Jonnali Parmenius
- Producers: Zedd; Lotus IV

Zedd singles chronology
"The Middle" (2018)	"Stay" (covered by Riri) (2018)	"Happy Now" (2018)

Riri singles chronology
"Yes Be Free" (2016)	"Stay" (covered by Riri) (2018)	"Maybe One Day" (2018)

Music video
- "Stay (Covered by Riri)" on YouTube

Japanese singer Riri covered "Stay" during a live performance at a Line Live special event. The cover eventually was released to digital stores on 20 June 2018 due to fan requests, by Interscope Records and Sony Music Associated Records.

=== Background ===
In February 2017, Zedd performed "Stay" in Japan at a festival. He proposed a Japanese cover to Universal wanting the song to be "known to everyone in Japan". Amongst many candidates, Riri ultimately was chosen to cover the song. The cover was announced in March 2018 by Universal Music Japan. The song later was released digitally on 20 June 2018 in Japan only. The cover was included on the Japanese digital version of Riri's second studio album, Neo.

=== Music video ===
A music video of Riri performing the song live was released by Universal Japan on 18 March 2018.

=== Live performances ===
Riri performed the song live in Japan at a Line Live special event in Japan in March 2018. During the event, Zedd spoke with Riri regarding the cover.

== Radio and release history ==
Release history and formats for "Stay"
Region	Date	Format	Version	Label	Ref.
United States	23 February 2017	Digital download	Original	Interscope	
Italy	24 February 2017	Contemporary hit radio	Original	Universal	
United States	7 March 2017	Contemporary hit radio	Original	Def Jam; Interscope	
United States	4 April 2017	Rhythmic radio	Original	Def Jam; Interscope	
Australia	2 June 2017	Digital download	Remixes EP	Interscope	
United States	9 June 2017	Digital download	Acoustic	Interscope	
Germany	31 October 2017	CD single	Original	Interscope	
Japan	20 June 2018	Digital Download	Covered by Riri	Interscope; Sony Music Associated Records; Universal Japan	
