= Bedroom Floor =

Single by Liam Payne

from the album LP1
- Released: 20 October 2017
- Genre: Electropop; dance pop
- Length: 3:08
- Label: Capitol
- Songwriters: Jacob Kasher Hindlin; Charlie Puth; Ammar Malik; Steve Mac; Aaron Jennings; Noel Zancanella
- Producers: Steve Mac; Ben Rice

Liam Payne singles chronology
"Get Low" (2017)	"Bedroom Floor" (2017)	"For You" (2018)

Music video
- "Bedroom Floor" on YouTube

"Bedroom Floor" is a song by the English singer-songwriter Liam Payne. It was written by Jacob Kasher, Charlie Puth, Ammar Malik, Steve Mac, Aaron Jennings and Noel Zancanella, with production handled by Mac and Ben Rice. The song was released on 20 October 2017 via Capitol and appears on Payne's debut studio album LP1. It impacted US contemporary hit radio on 24 October 2017.

== Background ==
Payne first revealed the song during his appearance on the Radio 1 Breakfast Show. Payne said of the song, after his girlfriend Cheryl texted host Nick Grimshaw telling him to ask Payne about it: "'Bedroom Floor' was the single before ['Strip That Down'] was the single. Naturally, it could only be the next one. That's going to be my next single and I'm not allowed to say that yet. [Me and Cheryl] both like that song and it's been her favourite from the start." He revealed the song's release date in a tweet on 23 September 2017. Talking about how he will perform the song during the iHeartRadio Jingle Ball Tour, Payne said to Billboard: "I want the visual to be really good for that. It's just a great song, I can never listen to it and get bored. And all my family loves it as well, so I've got to give it some love." He posted a teaser of the song and a preview of its accompanying music video on 17 and 18 October 2017 respectively. A day before the song's release, he debuted the lyrics through Instagram Stories.

== Critical reception ==
Adam Starkey of Metro regarded the song as "a significant improvement over his debut 'Strip That Down', boasting some nice falsetto muscle and a stronger earworm hook" but found the lyrics cringy. Hugh McIntyre of Forbes also felt that the song is "far sweeter than its predecessor", saying that its lyrics are comparatively "naughtier". Ross McNeilage of MTV News praised Payne for "sounding incredible as he shows off his insane falsetto for most of the track", deeming the song "a laidback, luscious dream from the production to his vocals".

== Live performances ==
Payne performed "Bedroom Floor" on The X Factor on 28 October 2017. He later performed the song on the episode of The Ellen DeGeneres Show that aired on 28 November 2017.

== Music video ==
The music video was released on 6 November 2017 and directed by Declan Whitebloom, starring Bella Thorne as Payne's love interest.

== Personnel ==
Credits adapted from Tidal.

- Liam Payne – vocals
- Steve Mac – production, synthesizer
- Ben Rice – production
- Randy Merrill – mastering engineering
- Bill Zimmerman – engineering
- Dann Pursey – engineering
- Chris Laws – engineering, drums
- Phil Tan – mixing

== Charts ==
Chart (2017)	Peak position
Australia (ARIA)	52
Austria (Ö3 Austria Top 40)	69
Belgium (Ultratip Bubbling Under Flanders)	13
Belgium (Ultratip Bubbling Under Wallonia)	11
Canada Hot 100 (Billboard)	63
Czech Republic Airplay (ČNS IFPI)	97
Czech Republic Singles Digital (ČNS IFPI)	47
Finland Download (Latauslista)	22
France (SNEP)	102
Germany (GfK)	100
Ireland (IRMA)	30
Latvia (DigiTop100)	72
Netherlands (Dutch Top 40 Tiparade)	12
New Zealand Heatseekers (RMNZ)	1
Philippines (Philippine Hot 100)	53
Portugal (AFP)	55
Scottish Singles Sales (Official Charts)	13
Slovakia Singles Digital (ČNS IFPI)	34
Sweden (Sverigetopplistan)	100
Switzerland (Schweizer Hitparade)	95
UK Singles (Official Charts)	21
US Billboard Hot 100	98
US Pop Airplay (Billboard)	35

== Certifications ==
Region	Certification	Certified units/sales
Australia (ARIA)	Gold	35,000^{‡}
Brazil (Pro-Música Brasil)	Gold	30,000^{‡}
Canada (Music Canada)	Gold	40,000^{‡}
New Zealand (RMNZ)	Gold	15,000^{‡}
United Kingdom (BPI)	Gold	400,000^{‡}
^{‡} Sales+streaming figures based on certification alone.

== Release history ==
Region	Date	Format(s)	Version	Label	Ref.
Various	20 October 2017	Digital download	Original	Capitol	
United Kingdom	21 October 2017	Contemporary hit radio	Original	Polydor	
United States	24 October 2017	Contemporary hit radio	Original	Republic	
Various	8 December 2017	Digital download	Acoustic	Capitol	
