= Stack It Up =

Single by Liam Payne featuring A Boogie wit da Hoodie

from the album LP1
- Released: 18 September 2019
- Genre: Urban pop; R&B; hip hop
- Length: 2:46
- Label: Capitol
- Songwriters: Ed Sheeran; Artist Dubose; Steve McCutcheon; Frederick Gibson
- Producer: Steve Mac

Liam Payne singles chronology
"Polaroid" (2018)	"Stack It Up" (2019)	"All I Want (For Christmas)" (2019)

A Boogie wit da Hoodie singles chronology
"Mood Swings" (2019)	"Stack It Up" (2019)	"Stretch You Out" (2019)

Music video
- "Stack It Up" on YouTube

"Stack It Up" is a song by the English singer and songwriter Liam Payne featuring American rapper A Boogie wit da Hoodie, released on 18 September 2019 as the fifth single off Payne's debut studio album LP1. It was co-written by Ed Sheeran and produced by Steve Mac. It is Payne's first release as a solo lead artist since 2018's "First Time". Some radio stations played the no rap version of the song.

== Background ==
Payne announced the song's release date and shared its cover art on social media on 10 September. Payne stated that the song is about "working hard, being inspired and achieving your dreams."

Payne performed an acoustic version of the song at Vevo's New York City studio and released it digitally on 16 October 2019.

== Composition ==
"Stack It Up" was written by Ed Sheeran, Artist Dubose, Steve McCutcheon and Frederick Gibson, while production was handled by Steve Mac. Musicially, the song has been described as a midtempo track and urban pop, with influences from trap and hip hop music.

Speaking on the KISS Breakfast show, Payne discussed writing the song with Sheeran stating, "We changed a couple things about the song because the song, in a sense, is kind of one-dimensional in a way, in that it's about making money. It's better to make money with or for someone, to share with someone."

== Critical reception ==
Patrick Hosken of MTV stated, "Payne's got the chops, bounding from low croon to higher-register sultry swagger with ease... it still manages to lend 30 seconds to a boastful verse from A Boogie Wit Da Hoodie that also gives some life advice based on experience." Sade Spence of Elite Daily called the track "infectious." Salvatore Maicki of The Fader remarked, "it's all about reaping the benefits of late capitalism. A Boogie Wit da Hoodie agrees with Payne's sentiments, emphasized by his guest verse on the track. If, upon first listen, the song sounds like something Ed Sheeran would smear onto this world."

== Music video ==
The music video for "Stack It Up" was released on 18 September 2019. The video shows Payne and A Boogie wit da Hoodie dancing and playing games in an arcade, as well as the pair becoming animated at one point. The video was directed by Nathan R. Smith.

== Track listing ==
Digital download
No.	Title	Length
1.	"Stack It Up" (featuring A Boogie wit da Hoodie)	2:46

Digital download – acoustic
No.	Title	Length
1.	"Stack It Up" (acoustic)	2:42

== Charts ==
=== Weekly charts ===
Chart (2019–2020)	Peak position
Belgium (Ultratip Bubbling Under Flanders)	17
Belgium (Ultratip Bubbling Under Wallonia)	24
CIS Airplay (TopHit)	120
Czech Republic Airplay (ČNS IFPI)	10
Germany Airplay (BVMI)	1
Hungary (Rádiós Top 40)	16
Netherlands (Dutch Top 40 Tiparade)	15
New Zealand Hot Singles (RMNZ)	10
Romania (Airplay 100)	67
Russia Airplay (Tophit)	112
Scottish Singles Sales (Official Charts)	33
Slovakia Airplay (ČNS IFPI)	26
Slovenia (SloTop50)	22
South Korea (Gaon)	150
UK Singles (Official Charts)	84

=== Year-end charts ===
Chart (2020)	Position
Hungary (Rádiós Top 40)	45

== Certifications ==
Region	Certification	Certified units/sales
Brazil (Pro-Música Brasil)	Gold	20,000^{‡}
Canada (Music Canada)	Gold	40,000^{‡}
^{‡} Sales+streaming figures based on certification alone.

== Release history ==
Region	Date	Format	Version	Label	Ref.
Various	18 September 2019	Digital download; streaming	Original	Capitol	
United States	24 September 2019	Top 40 radio	Original	Republic	
Various	16 October 2019	Digital download; streaming	Acoustic	Capitol	
Italy	18 October 2019	Contemporary hit radio	Original	Universal	
