= Remedy (Alesso song) =

2018 single by Alesso

Single by Alesso

from the EP Midnight Hour
- Released: 31 August 2018
- Length: 3:10
- Label: 10:22 pm
- Songwriters: Andrew Haas; Alma Gudmundsdottir; Alessandro Lindblad; Jake Torrey; Ian Franzino
- Producers: Alesso; Afterhrs

Alesso singles chronology
"Is That for Me" (2017)	"Remedy" (2018)	"Tilted Towers" (2018)

Music video
- "REMEDY" on YouTube

"Remedy" (stylized in all caps) is a song by Swedish DJ and record producer Alesso. It features vocals from English singer Conor Maynard. It was released on 31 August 2018.

== Charts ==
=== Weekly charts ===
Chart (2018–2019)	Peak position
Czech Republic Airplay (ČNS IFPI)	59
Hungary (Dance Top 40)	9
Hungary (Rádiós Top 40)	1
Hungary (Single Top 40)	7
Hungary (Stream Top 40)	31
Lithuania (AGATA)	16
Netherlands (Single Top 100)	31
Norway (VG-lista)	11
Sweden (Sverigetopplistan)	30
US Hot Dance/Electronic Songs (Billboard)	17

=== Year-end charts ===
Chart (2018)	Position
US Hot Dance/Electronic Songs (Billboard)	62
Chart (2019)	Position
Hungary (Dance Top 40)	38
Hungary (Rádiós Top 40)	9
US Hot Dance/Electronic Songs (Billboard)	98

== Certifications ==
Region	Certification	Certified units/sales
Brazil (Pro-Música Brasil)	2× Platinum	80,000^{‡}
Denmark (IFPI Danmark)	Gold	45,000^{‡}
Italy (FIMI)	Gold	25,000^{‡}
New Zealand (RMNZ)	Gold	15,000^{‡}
Poland (ZPAV)	Gold	25,000^{‡}
Spain (Promusicae)	Gold	30,000^{‡}
United States (RIAA)	Gold	500,000^{‡}
Streaming
Sweden (GLF)	Platinum	8,000,000^{†}
^{‡} Sales+streaming figures based on certification alone.^{†} Streaming-only figures based on certification alone.
