= Three. Two. One. =

2020 studio album by Lennon Stella

Studio album by Lennon Stella
- Released: April 24, 2020
- Genre: Pop
- Length: 42:50
- Label: Columbia
- Producers: Malay; Captain Cuts; Big Taste; Douglas Charles Showalter; Sam de Jong; Eg White; Joel Little; Ruslan Odnoralov; WYNNE; Tyler Johnson

Lennon Stella chronology
Love, Me. (2018)	Three. Two. One. (2020)	Sleeping Lion (2026)

Singles from Three. Two. One.
- 1. "Kissing Other People" Released: November 1, 2019; 2. "Golf on TV" Released: February 12, 2020; 3. "Jealous" Released: March 13, 2020; 4. "Fear of Being Alone" Released: April 10, 2020; 5. "Older Than I Am" Released: April 24, 2020

Three. Two. One. is the debut studio album by Canadian singer-songwriter Lennon Stella, released on April 24, 2020, by Columbia Records. She collaborated with various producers, including Malay, Joel Little and Sam de Jong. Five tracks were issued as singles: "Kissing Other People", "Golf on TV" (featuring JP Saxe), "Jealous", "Fear of Being Alone", and "Older Than I Am". The album follows her debut EP Love, Me, released on November 16, 2018.

== Background ==
In an interview with Apple Music, Stella describes Three. Two. One. as "releasing myself from the pressure of prior expectations and intimidations. Three, two, one, I’m diving in and doing what feels good to myself. The album is a free fall. Ultimately, I wanted [this album] to be an honest introduction, true to who I am as a human being, and hopefully people will draw parallels to their own lives." The track "Save Us" features an interpolation of British singer Donna Lewis's 1996 hit "I Love You Always Forever". The song "Jealous" features songwriting credits from Finneas. Three. Two. One. is a pop album.

== Critical reception ==
Professional ratings
Review scores
Source	Rating
Evening Standard	4/5 stars
Exclaim!	8/10
Idolator	4/5
The Observer	3/5

Three. Two. One. received positive reviews. In The Observer, critic Kitty Empire gives it three stars and calls it "strikingly serene". In Exclaim!, Ariel Matheson gives it an 8/10 and calls it a "feminine powerhouse".

== Track listing ==
Credits adapted from the liner notes of Three. Two. One.

No.	Title	Writer(s)	Producer(s)	Length
1.	"Much Too Much"	Lennon Stella; Malay Ho; Simon Wilcox; Sam Romans	Malay	3:31
2.	"Kissing Other People"	Stella; Caroline Ailin; Wilcox; Benjamin Berger; Ryan McMahon; Ryan Rabin	Captain Cuts; Malay^{[a]}; Ruslan Odnoralov^{[b]}; Cody Tarpley^{[b]}; Jenna Andrews^{[b]}	2:42
3.	"Games"	Stella; Ailin; Mike Woods; Michael McCall	Sam de Jong; Woods^{[a]}	2:24
4.	"Fear of Being Alone"	Paul "Phamous" Shelton; Ho; Ailin; Emily Warren	Malay; Odnoralov^{[b]}	2:52
5.	"Pretty Boy"	Stella; Ho; Shelton	Malay	3:08
6.	"Golf on TV"	Stella; Wilcox; Jonathan Percy Saxe; Odnoralov	Odnoralov	3:11
7.	"Older Than I Am"	Skyler Stonestreet; Emily Weisband; Berger; McMahon; Rabin	Malay	3:02
8.	"Bend over Backwards"	Stella; Ho; Wilcox; Sammy Witte; Kevin Garrett	Malay	2:54
9.	"Jealous"	Stella; Finneas O'Connell; Justin Gammella; Odnoralov; Weisband; Erin McCarley	Joel Little; Odnoralov^{[c]}	2:03
10.	"Since I Was a Kid"	Stella; Ailin; Wilcox; Leroy Clampitt	Clampitt; Odnoralov^{[b]}	3:00
11.	"Weakness (Huey Lewis)" (featuring Maisy Stella)	Stella; Warren; Eg White; de Jong; McCarley	de Jong; White; Odnoralov^{[b]}	7:48
12.	"Save Us"	Stella; Donna Lewis; Rory Andrew; Hayley Gene Penner; Jaramye Daniels	Andrew; Johan Lenox^{[c]}; Odnoralov^{[b]}	3:01
13.	"Goodnight"	Stella; Daniels; Andrew	Andrew; Tyler Johnson; Douglas Showalter; Odnoralov^{[b]}	2:57
Total length:				42:50

=== Notes ===
- ^a signifies co-producer
- ^b signifies vocal producer
- ^c signifies additional producer

Sample credits

- "Save Us" contains elements of "I Love You Always Forever" (1996) performed by Donna Lewis.

== Charts ==
Chart performance of Three. Two. One.
Chart (2020)	Peak position
Australian Albums (ARIA)	54
Canadian Albums Chart	10
New Zealand Albums (RMNZ)	30
Scottish Albums (Official Charts)	54
UK Albums (Official Charts)	91
US Billboard 200	80
