= Downtown (Anitta and J Balvin song) =

Single by Anitta and J Balvin
- Language: Spanish
- Released: 19 November 2017
- Recorded: 2017
- Genre: Latin pop; reggaeton
- Length: 3:13
- Label: Warner Brasil
- Songwriters: Larissa Machado; José Balvin; Alejandro Ramírez; Justin Quiles
- Producer: Sky Rompiendo

Anitta singles chronology
"Is That for Me" (2017)	"Downtown" (2017)	"Vai Malandra" (2017)

J Balvin singles chronology
"Sensualidad" (2017)	"Downtown" (2017)	"Bum Bum Tam Tam (Remix)" (2017)

Music video
- "Downtown" on YouTube

"Downtown" is a song by Brazilian singer Anitta and Colombian singer J Balvin fully sung in Spanish, despite its title being in English. It was written by Anitta and Balvin together with Justin Quiles and producer Sky Rompiendo. The song was released as a single on 19 November 2017 as part of Anitta's project entitled Check Mate, in which she released a new song each month. The track was nominated for a Latin Grammy Award for Best Urban Song at the 19th Latin Grammy Awards.

== Background ==
In early 2016, Anitta and J Balvin collaborated for the first time when she did a remix for his single "Ginza", which received an official release as a single only in Brazil. Following that, Anitta began planning an international career and started releasing a series of collaborations including singles with artists such as Maluma, Iggy Azalea and Major Lazer during 2016 and 2017 in order to start the process of establishing her career outside of Brazil. The collaboration with Iggy Azalea, "Switch", marked the first time Anitta released a song in which she sings in English. A single named "Paradinha", which is sung in Spanish, followed in 2017 and became one of Anitta's biggest hits in Brazil whilst also charting in other countries such as Mexico and Portugal.

Later in 2017, Anitta announced a project entitled Check Mate, in which consists of releasing a new song in rather English, Spanish or Portuguese along with its accompanying music video. She launched the project with the premiere of the Poo Bear-produced "Will I See You" which became her first single in English as a main artist. In October 2017, she adventured into EDM by releasing the single "Is That for Me", a collaboration with Swedish DJ Alesso.

For the November Check Mate release, Anitta announced she would be releasing a collaboration with Colombian singer J Balvin, following his worldwide breakout with hit single "Mi Gente". About working with Balvin, Anitta said it was “incredible” and that they have "worked together before, but [she was] happy [they] made this song. He’s one of [her] favorite artists, so this was an amazing experience”.

== Promotion and release ==
Anitta and J Balvin performed the song together for the first time before its official release on Spotify event in Las Vegas to promote a new version of "¡Viva Latino!" playlist. Following that, the single premiered on Spotify on the relaunched "¡Viva Latino!" playlist with an exclusive vertical music video on 19 November 2017 and was later added to several playlists, including "Today's Top Hits", which is Spotify's playlist with the most followers. A billboard featuring Anitta and Balvin promoting the single and Spotify streaming service was put on Times Square, New York, on 26 November 2017. On 5 September 2018, Anitta performed the song with Lali at Talento FOX, where they also performed Lali's song "100 Grados".

=== Accolades ===
Year	Ceremony	Category	Result	Ref.
2018	Latin Grammy Awards	Best Urban Song	Nominated	
2018	ERES México Awards	Best Music Video	Won	
2018	Prêmio Jovem Brasileiro	¡Me Gusta!	Nominated	
2018	MTV Millennial Awards Brasil	Feat of the year	Won	
2018	MTV Millennial Awards	Hit del Año	Won	
2018	The LUKAS Awards	Song of the year	Nominated	

== Music videos ==
=== Spotify video ===
A music video premiered on Spotify's mobile app on 19 November 2017, on the newly relaunched ¡Viva Latino! playlist, and became the first vertical video by a Brazilian star to premiere as a Spotify exclusive. The vertical music video features Anitta sensually dancing with another woman in white and green backgrounds while J Balvin performs his verses.

=== Lyric video ===
On 15 December 2017, a lyric video starring Internet sensations Lele Pons and Juanpa Zurita premiered on Pons' YouTube channel.

=== Official video ===
The official music video was shot by director Bruno Igloti in New York City on 7 November 2017. Anitta traveled to New York for a number of promotional meetings and then met with Balvin and Igloti on set for the shooting of the video. Igloti and Anitta have previously worked together on several of Anitta's music videos, including the 2017's videos for the singles "Paradinha" and "Sua Cara". Anitta and Balvin first teased the video by posting a series of behind-the-scenes photos and videos on their social medias during its shooting. The video was eventually released on 20 November 2017, a day after the song debuted on streaming services and online stores.

The concept of the video is the exploration of the glamorous universe of the 1940s Parisian casinos and it features Anitta and J Balvin joining forces to carry out a plan against fellow casino players and cheat on the games in order to steal their money. About the characters portrayed by Balvin and Anitta, the latter says "gambling is their universe. They observe every detail in that environment before applying their moves. They are cheaters and accomplices". The costumes used by Anitta featured a mix of clothing from the C&A department store — the singer's sponsor in the Check Mate project — with other elements created by stylists for the singer.

== Chart performance ==
"Downtown" peaked at No. 14 in the United States on the Billboard Hot Latin Songs chart, becoming Anitta's first entry on the American music charts, at the time. The single became a No. 1 hit in Paraguay and charted within the top ten of several countries, including Bolivia, Colombia, Costa Rica, the Dominican Republic, Honduras, Portugal, Uruguay, and Spain; peaking at No. 7 in Portugal, "Downtown" became J Balvin's second most-successful song in the country, at the time, just behind his worldwide hit "Mi Gente" (a collaboration with Beyoncé, which previously had topped the Portuguese charts).

Upon its release, "Downtown" was Anitta's most successful single in Colombia, up until that point, and was her first entry on American, Spanish and Swiss charts, respectively.

== Track listing ==
Digital download

1. "Downtown" – 3:13

== Credits and personnel ==
- Vocals – Anitta, J Balvin
- Songwriting – Anitta, J Balvin, Sky Rompiendo, Justin Quiles
- Production – Sky Rompiendo

== Charts ==
=== Weekly charts ===
Chart (2017–2018)	Peak position
Argentina (Monitor Latino)	15
Bolivia (Monitor Latino)	10
Brazil (Brasil Hot 100 Airplay)	33
Brazil Streaming (Pro-Música)	3
Colombia (Monitor Latino)	9
Colombia (National-Report)	9
Costa Rica (Monitor Latino)	8
Dominican Republic (Monitor Latino)	8
Ecuador (National-Report)	13
El Salvador (Monitor Latino)	14
Greece International (IFPI)	50
Guatemala (Monitor Latino)	15
Honduras (Monitor Latino)	4
Latvia (DigiTop100)	90
Mexico Espanol Airplay (Billboard)	14
Panama (Monitor Latino)	12
Paraguay (Monitor Latino)	1
Portugal (AFP)	7
Romania (Airplay 100)	38
Spain (PROMUSICAE)	8
Switzerland (Schweizer Hitparade)	73
Uruguay (Monitor Latino)	7
US Hot Latin Songs (Billboard)	14
US Latin Airplay (Billboard)	29
US Latin Rhythm Airplay (Billboard)	15
Venezuela (National-Report)	33

=== Year-end charts ===
Chart (2018)	Position
Argentina (Monitor Latino)	37
Bolivia (Monitor Latino)	37
Chile Urbano (Monitor Latino)	69
Colombia (Monitor Latino)	53
Costa Rica (Monitor Latino)	50
Dominican Republic (Monitor Latino)	50
El Salvador (Monitor Latino)	33
Guatemala (Monitor Latino)	47
Honduras (Monitor Latino)	62
Panama (Monitor Latino)	28
Paraguay (Monitor Latino)	21
Portugal (AFP)	15
Spain (PROMUSICAE)	33
Uruguay (Monitor Latino)	22
US Hot Latin Songs (Billboard)	36

== Certifications ==
Region	Certification	Certified units/sales
Argentina (CAPIF)	Platinum	20,000^{^}
France (SNEP)	Gold	100,000^{‡}
Italy (FIMI)	Gold	25,000^{‡}
Portugal (AFP)	3× Platinum	30,000^{‡}
Spain (Promusicae)	3× Platinum	180,000^{‡}
United States (RIAA)	6× Platinum (Latin)	360,000^{‡}
^{‡} Sales+streaming figures based on certification alone.

== Covers ==
In November 2020, the South Korean girl group Purple Kiss covered the song as part of their international medley of covers of the top female vocalist from each country.

== See also ==
- List of best-selling singles in Spain
