= Bola Rebola =

Single by Tropkillaz, J Balvin, and Anitta featuring MC Zaac
- Language: Portuguese; English; Spanish
- Released: 22 February 2019
- Genre: Funk carioca; trap; pop; hip hop
- Length: 3:13
- Label: Universal Music
- Songwriters: André Laudz; José de Godoy; Isaac Daniel Junior; José Balvin; Larissa Machado; Hailey Leane Collier; Jazelle Paris Rodriguez
- Producer: Tropkillaz

Tropkillaz singles chronology
"Perfect" (2019)	"Bola Rebola" (2019)	"Grow Like This" (2019)

J Balvin singles chronology
"Tudo Bom" (2019)	"Bola Rebola" (2019)	"I Can't Get Enough" (2019)

Anitta singles chronology
"Terremoto" (2019)	"Bola Rebola" (2019)	"Favela Chegou" (2019)

MC Zaac singles chronology
"Caô" (2019)	"Bola Rebola" (2019)	"Pra Sentar" (2019)

Music video
- "Bola Rebola" on YouTube

"Bola Rebola" is a song by Brazilian production duo Tropkillaz, Colombian singer J Balvin, and Brazilian singer-songwriter Anitta featuring fellow Brazilian musician MC Zaac. Written alongside Hailey Leane Collier and Jazelle Paris Rodriguez, it was released as a single on 22 February 2019, through Universal Music. Featuring lines in Portuguese, English, and Spanish, the song has been classified by O Globo as a crossover of funk carioca with multiple genres.

== Background and release ==
"[The song is] really representative of Brazilian/baile funk music and shows our culture can crossover with different genres"

— Tropkillaz talking about the song to Complex Magazine.

In December 2017, Anitta released "Vai Malandra", a funk carioca collaboration with Maejor, Tropkillaz, MC Zaac and DJ Yuri Martins as the conclusion of her Check Mate project. The song instantly became a hit, receiving over one million plays on Spotify on its first day of release and breaking the record for the most streams received in a day in Brazil – held previously by Taylor Swift's "Look What You Made Me Do". On its second day of release, the song was played more than two million times, surpassing once again the record for the most streamed song in a day in Brazil. Due to the amount of streams received on its first days of release, the song even debuted on the Global Top 50 chart in Spotify and became the first song in Portuguese to hit the top 20 on that chart on December 20, 2017.

In 2019, Tropkillaz announced a new collaboration with Anitta and MC Zaac titled "Bola Rebola", which also was announced to feature Colombian recording artist J Balvin. According to Tropkillaz, Anitta contacted Balvin and asked him if he would join the song, to which he accepted. The produced duo intended to release the song in time for the Carnival of 2019 so it could become "the carnival anthem". The song instantly became a hit and was the most streamed song on Spotify in Brazil for over 30 days.

== Track listing ==
Digital download

1. "Bola Rebola" – 3:13

== Credits and personnel ==
- Vocals – J Balvin, Anitta, MC Zaac
- Songwriting – Tropkillaz, Anitta, J Balvin, Isaac Daniel Junior (MC Zaac), Hailey Leane Collier, and Jazelle Paris Rodriguez
- Production – Tropkillaz

== Charts ==
=== Weekly charts ===
Chart (2019)	Peak position
Bolivia (Monitor Latino)	16
Brazil Streaming (Pro-Música)	1
Colombia (National-Report)	92
Honduras (Monitor Latino)	12
Nicaragua (Monitor Latino)	1
Portugal (AFP)	12
Portugal Digital Songs (Billboard)	3
US Latin Digital Song Sales (Billboard)	12
US Hot Latin Songs (Billboard)	46
Venezuela (National-Report)	4

=== Year-end charts ===
Chart (2019)	Position
Nicaragua (Monitor Latino)	34
Portugal (AFP)	44

== Certifications ==
Region	Certification	Certified units/sales
Portugal (AFP)	2× Platinum	20,000^{‡}
United States (RIAA)	Platinum (Latin)	60,000^{‡}
^{‡} Sales+streaming figures based on certification alone.
