= All I Want (For Christmas) =

Single by Liam Payne

from the album LP1
- Released: 25 October 2019
- Genre: Christmas
- Length: 3:01
- Label: Capitol
- Songwriter(s): James Newman; Samuel Preston; Phil Cook
- Producer(s): Phil Cook

Liam Payne singles chronology
"Stack It Up" (2019)	"All I Want (For Christmas)" (2019)	"Live Forever" (2019)

Music video
- "All I Want (For Christmas)" on YouTube

"All I Want (For Christmas)" is a song by the English singer and songwriter Liam Payne. It was released on 25 October 2019 by Capitol Records as the sixth single off Payne's debut studio album LP1.

== Background ==
On 23 October, Payne revealed a preview of "All I Want (For Christmas)" and that it would serve as his next single. It was written by James Newman, Samuel Preston and Philip Cook, while production was handled by Cook. The song has been described as a "gentle ballad". The song finds Payne singing about a broken relationship and hopes to mend it before the holiday season.

== Critical reception ==
Regina Star of iHeartRadio gave a positive review for the song stating, "Payne's record is far more somber, as the musician croons of wanting to save his broken relationship with his beloved." Hollywood Life noted how different the track is compared to other Christmas songs remarking, "Finally, a song that captures the darker side of the holidays that 'Jingle Bells' can't quite accomplish."

== Music video ==
An animated lyrics video premiered on 25 October 2019. A music video to accompany the release of "All I Want (For Christmas)" was later released onto YouTube on 29 November.

== Charts ==
Chart performance for "All I Want (For Christmas)"
Chart (2019–2023)	Peak position
Austria (Ö3 Austria Top 40)	71
Belgium (Ultratop 50 Flanders)	30
Germany (GfK)	75
Ireland (IRMA)	75
New Zealand Hot Singles (RMNZ)	18
Portugal (AFP)	183
Switzerland (Schweizer Hitparade)	76
UK Singles (OCC)	73
US Adult Contemporary (Billboard)	18
US Holiday Digital Song Sales (Billboard)	20

== Release history ==
Release history and formats for "All I Want (For Christmas)"
Region	Date	Format	Label	Ref.
United Kingdom	25 October 2019	Digital download; streaming	Capitol	
