= Live Forever (Liam Payne song) =

- Cover art for the remix EP of the song

Single by Liam Payne featuring Cheat Codes

from the album LP1
- Released: 6 December 2019
- Genre: EDM-pop; dance
- Length: 2:54
- Label: Capitol
- Songwriters: Samuel Preston; Evan Kidd Bogart; Sylvester "Sly" Sivertsen; Trevor Dahl, Kevin Ford, Matthew Elifritz
- Producers: Trevor Dahl, Matthew Elifritz, Kevin Pederson; Sly

Liam Payne singles chronology
| "All I Want (For Christmas)" (2019) | "Live Forever" (2019) | "Midnight" (2020) |

Cheat Codes singles chronology
| "Highway" (2019) | "Live Forever" (2019) | "No Service in the Hills" (2020) |

Music video
- "Live Forever" on YouTube

"Live Forever" is a song by the English singer and songwriter Liam Payne featuring American DJ trio Cheat Codes for Payne's debut studio album. It is the seventh and final single from his debut studio album LP1 (2019). The song accompanied the album's release on 6 December 2019.

== Composition ==
"Live Forever" was written by Samuel Preston, Evan Kidd Bogart, Matthew Ellifrtitz, Kevin Pederson, Trevor Dahl, and Sylvester Sivertsen, while production was handled by Matthew Elifritz, Kevin Pederson, Trevor Dahl and Silvertsen. According to Preston, the song was inspired by a near fatal accident he suffered in Denmark after falling off a second floor balcony when intoxicated on champagne and sleeping pills. The song has been described as a romantic track that finds Payne singing about how "the person he loves makes him want to 'live forever'." Musically, the track is an EDM-pop and dance song. It was written in the key of E minor and has a tempo of 85 BPM.

== Live performances ==
Payne performed the song on The Tonight Show Starring Jimmy Fallon. He also performed the song on The Today Show.

== Music video ==
The Similar But Different-directed music video accompanied the song's release. It was filmed on the Isle of Wight and shows Payne levitating near crashing waves and exploring seaside caves, as well as stunt driving with Cheat Codes.

== Track listing ==
Digital download and stream
| No. | Title | Length |
|---|---|---|
| 1. | "Live Forever" (featuring Cheat Codes) | 2:54 |

Digital EP – remixes
| No. | Title | Length |
|---|---|---|
| 1. | "Live Forever" (R3hab remix) | 2:24 |
| 2. | "Live Forever" (99 Souls remix) | 3:12 |
| 3. | "Live Forever" (Mahalo remix) | 2:34 |
| 4. | "Live Forever" (Dee Swan and Gregatron remix) | 3:57 |
| Total length: | | 12:07 |

== Credits and personnel ==
Credits adapted from Tidal.

- Liam Payne – vocals
- Trevor Dahl – production (as part of Cheat Codes)
- Sly – songwriting, production, keyboards
- Sam Preston – songwriting, backing vocals
- E. Kidd Bogart – songwriting
- Oscar Sebastian Enroth – guitar
- Tobias Ring – guitar
- John Hanes – engineering, studio personnel
- Serban Ghenea – mixing, studio personnel
- Randy Merrill – mastering, studio personnel

== Charts ==
| Chart (2020) | Peak position |
|---|---|
| Czech Republic Airplay (ČNS IFPI) | 64 |

== Release history ==
| Region | Date | Format | Version | Label | Ref. |
|---|---|---|---|---|---|
| Various | 6 December 2019 | Digital download; streaming | Original | Capitol | |
| Australia | 6 December 2019 | Contemporary hit radio | Original | Capitol | |
| Italy | 10 January 2020 | Contemporary hit radio | Original | Universal | |
| United Kingdom | 18 January 2020 | Adult contemporary radio | Original | Capitol | |
| Various | 6 February 2020 | Digital download; streaming | Remixes | Capitol | |
