= Get Low (Zedd and Liam Payne song) =

Single by Zedd and Liam Payne

from the album Stay + and LP1
- Released: 6 July 2017
- Genre: EDM; pop
- Length: 3:24
- Label: Interscope
- Songwriters: Charles Hinshaw; Anton Zaslavski; Tristan Landymore; Fabienne Holloway
- Producer: Zedd

Zedd singles chronology
"Stay" (2017)	"Get Low" (2017)	"The Middle" (2018)

Liam Payne singles chronology
"Strip That Down" (2017)	"Get Low" (2017)	"Bedroom Floor" (2017)

"Get Low" is a song by the German DJ and record producer Zedd and the English singer-songwriter Liam Payne. The song was written by Charles Hinshaw, Zedd, Tristan Landymore and Fabienne Holloway, with production handled by Zedd. It was released on 6 July 2017, through Interscope Records. It is also included on Payne's debut studio album LP1. As of September 2017, "Get Low" has moved around 61,800 digital copies in the United States according to Nielsen SoundScan.

== Background ==
In an interview with Beats 1, Zedd described the song as his definition of a summer song, and has a "Drake-ish influenced sound".

"We created a song that I would say is probably the most urban-ish influenced song I've ever done, it's insanely catchy and I feel like you're gonna hate it after a while because it's so catchy. I think it's a good balance between where he is going with his solo project and where I'm going with my own music, it's right in between."

He described the collaboration similar to what he did with Alessia Cara for his previous single "Stay". "Without Liam, I might've never finished this song. He really pulled it towards a direction that I would not have, and I love where it is." On 3 July 2017, both artists confirmed the single's release date on social media. Alongside was the single's artwork, in which pink palm trees and a clear blue sky were featured.

== Composition ==
"Get Low" is a quick-spaced tropical dance, club-pop song that contains light percussion and a lead tropical house synth line. Amid sexually charged lyrics, Payne talks to a potential lover over "buoyant" synths on the chorus.

Zedd began working on the song before he met Payne. When he reached out to Payne and the pair started working on the track, Zedd felt that Payne "gave the song a lot of soul and really influenced the song a lot."

== Critical reception ==
Writing for Billboard, Sadie Bell felt the song "takes you on a trip to paradise inspired by its house bass and fantastical production." Bell wrote that the track feels like "the soundtrack to a summer getaway," with Payne's "mature" pop performance and the song's "sultry" lyrics. Jon Blistein of Rolling Stone described the song as "sultry and snappy," and Entertainment Weekly's Nick Roman called it a "sizzling summer jam." Much's Allison Bowsher felt the duo has "a bona fide earworm on their hands," where Payne delivered sexually charged lyrics "with attitude." Writing for Spin, Rob Arcand called it a "stomping summer house jam sure to conquer radio airwaves near-immediately" where Payne "croons with a steady swagger bigger than any of his work with One Direction." Erin Jensen for USA Today opined although the lyrics lack "depth," the "catchy summer anthem" has a "very danceable" beat, serving as a "perfect soundtrack for a day at the pool or a night at the club." Mike Neid of Idolator criticized the lack of "a drop or some heavier bass," while Joe Anderton of Digital Spy opined the tropical-pop vibe is "not exactly revolutionary."

== Music video ==
A music video for "Get Low" was released on 19 September 2017, directed by Andrew Donoho.

The video was filmed in the streets of London, showing the pair travelling to various locations including Trafalgar Square, Oxford Street and Convent Garden.

== Track listing ==
Digital download
No.	Title	Length
1.	"Get Low"	3:24

Digital download – Kuuro remix
No.	Title	Length
1.	"Get Low" (Kuuro remix)	3:38

CD single
No.	Title	Length
1.	"Get Low" (Zedd and Liam Payne)	3:24
2.	"Stay" (Zedd and Alessia Cara)	3:30

== Remix ==
On September 22, in the same year, an official remix was released was released by DJ Kuuro. Another remix was released on SoundCloud in December by DJ Big Z.

== Charts ==
=== Weekly charts ===
Weekly chart performance for "Get Low"
Chart (2017)	Peak position
Australia (ARIA)	39
Austria (Ö3 Austria Top 40)	54
Belgium (Ultratip Bubbling Under Flanders)	22
Belgium (Ultratip Bubbling Under Wallonia)	25
Canada Hot 100 (Billboard)	50
CIS Airplay (TopHit)	123
Colombia (National-Report)	73
Czech Republic Singles Digital (ČNS IFPI)	38
Czech Republic Airplay (ČNS IFPI)	44
Finland Digital Songs (Billboard)	6
France (SNEP)	180
Germany (GfK)	75
Hungary (Stream Top 40)	37
Ireland (IRMA)	37
Italy (Musica e Dischi)	35
Italian Airplay (EarOne)	88
Japan Hot 100 (Billboard)	64
Mexico Ingles Airplay (Billboard)	40
Netherlands (Dutch Top 40 Tiparade)	7
Netherlands (Single Top 100)	81
New Zealand Heatseekers (RMNZ)	2
Paraguay (Monitor Latino)	18
Philippines (Philippine Hot 100)	74
Poland Airplay (ZPAV)	42
Portugal (AFP)	42
Romania (Airplay 100)	63
Russia Airplay (Tophit)	130
Scotland Singles (Official Charts)	21
Slovakia Airplay (ČNS IFPI)	68
Slovakia Singles Digital (ČNS IFPI)	32
Sweden (Sverigetopplistan)	43
Switzerland (Schweizer Hitparade)	54
UK Singles (Official Charts)	26
Ukraine Airplay (TopHit)	69
US Billboard Hot 100	91
US Dance Club Songs (Billboard)	29
US Hot Dance/Electronic Songs (Billboard)	11
US Pop Airplay (Billboard)	23

=== Year-end charts ===
2017 year-end chart performance for "Get Low"
Chart (2017)	Position
Australia Dance (ARIA)	43
US Hot Dance/Electronic Songs (Billboard)	27

== Certifications ==
Certifications for "Get Low"
Region	Certification	Certified units/sales
Australia (ARIA)	Platinum	70,000^{‡}
Canada (Music Canada)	Platinum	80,000^{‡}
Mexico (AMPROFON)	Gold	30,000^{‡}
New Zealand (RMNZ)	Gold	15,000^{‡}
United Kingdom (BPI)	Silver	200,000^{‡}
United States (RIAA)	Gold	500,000^{‡}
^{‡} Sales+streaming figures based on certification alone.

== Release history ==
Release dates for "Get Low"
Region	Date	Format	Label	Ref.
Various	6 July 2017	Digital download	Interscope	
Italy	7 July 2017	Contemporary hit radio	Universal	
United States	11 July 2017	Contemporary hit radio	Interscope	
United Kingdom	28 July 2017	Contemporary hit radio	Polydor	
Various	22 September 2017	Digital download (Kuuro remix)	Interscope	
Germany	31 October 2017	Polydor	CD single	
