= Is That for Me =

Single by Alesso and Anitta
- Released: 13 October 2017
- Recorded: 2017
- Genre: EDM
- Length: 2:49
- Label: Warner Latina
- Songwriters: Poo Bear; Alessandro Lindblad; Anitta
- Producer: Alesso

Alesso singles chronology
"Let Me Go" (2017)	"Is That for Me" (2017)	"Remedy" (2018)

Anitta singles chronology
"Will I See You" (2017)	"Is That for Me" (2017)	"Downtown" (2017)

Music video
- "Is That for Me" on YouTube

"Is That for Me" is a song by Swedish DJ and record producer Alesso and Brazilian singer Anitta. It was written by Poo Bear together with Alesso and produced by the latter. The song was released as a single on 13 October 2017, and is part of Anitta's project entitled "Check Mate", in which she will release a new song every month.

== Background ==
The partnership was first signaled in September 2017 by entrepreneur John Shahidi, founder of the company Shots, known for helping build the career of Canadian singer Justin Bieber. Sahidi posted on his Instagram an image of a session between Anitta and Alesso with the caption "Alesso is the next one".

== Promotion ==
Anitta planned a massive promotional campaign for the track, starting with an appearance on the Brazilian late-night television program Altas Horas where, in a video conference with Alesso, she unveiled a short preview of the track. The song was also previewed on the Instagram pages of Anitta and clothing franchise C&A, showing behind-the-scenes footage of the music video. A 24-hour live broadcast showing the backstage of the release of the track was made using Instagram's Stories feature. The singer commented, "You will have 24 hours with Anitta, this application's [Instagram] stream will be live for 24 hours."

The first live performance took place on the morning show Encontro com Fátima Bernardes. At the time, the singer also performed "Sua Cara", "Paradinha" and "Will I See You". On that same day, the singer shared the stage with Alesso, performing the track at the Ultra Brasil festival for an audience of 50,000 people. On 17 October, Anitta appeared on TMZ's online news program TMZ Live. The singer went live for a video conference to speak with the hosts about "Is That for Me", which gained space on TMZ Live on account of its entry into the global Spotify Top 100. The song is expected to have a wider international release than "Will I See You". International radio has been playing music since the release weekend, and Anitta has revealed that she plans to travel with Alesso to perform at festivals of electronic music in other countries.

== Music video ==
=== Recording and themes ===
The music video for "Is That for Me" was directed by Manuel Nogueira and filmed on location in the Amazon rainforest in Manaus, Amazonas, on 9 October 2017. Filming took place just four days before the video's release, with the image editing done in the shortest time ever in Anitta's career. For the filming, Anitta's entire crew had to take yellow fever vaccine for prevention. The video was released on the same day as the single on 13 October 2017. The main theme of the video is the representation of the natural symbols of Brazil, seeking to show strength, courage and authenticity of the Brazilian woman. According to Yasmine Sterea, the Amazon was chosen to portray this theme because it is a place known worldwide as Brazilian heritage: "We decided to take a look at the beauty of various cultures in Brazil and show some of the colors of the Amazon. The forest has a special meaning to Anitta, so we brought that strength to the video's wardrobe. The idea was to create something that would stimulate us. Without rules and with a lot of vital energy."

=== Costumes and references ===
The costumes featured a mix of clothing from the C&A department store—the singer's sponsor in her "Check Mate" project—with other elements created by stylists for the singer, including Victor Viccenza boots, Valisere's lingerie and an accessory in the singer's signature. Designer of jewelry Beatriz Brennheisen. All the accessories used by the singer were influenced by the shamanic culture. Personal stylist Yasmine Sterea signed the costumes used by Alesso and Anitta in the video: "We are looking for references in all the beauty of Brazil and in what is more exotic. We have made a mix of textures, colors and all the cultures and beliefs that make part of Brazil". The two visuals Alesso - a white and red cape over a white suit and a white coat over a red dress - follow the minimalist style adopted by the DJ throughout his career.

The metallic bra represents Gaia, Mother Earth, goddess of mythology who took the steel out of her chest. In addition, the wardrobe also makes reference to singer Fernanda Abreu, considered as the "Brazilian pop pioneer", who used a bra made up of two frying pans on the Da Lata album tour and was censored by the Public Prosecutor's Office: "Anitta always respected the names of the Brazilian pop before her. It's also a tribute to Fernanda for bringing the pop to us", explained the stylist. The costumes used by Anitta among the royal victories refer to the colors of the fruits of the Amazon, while the singer uses a necklace with local seeds. The choice of the jaguar print is the most representative of the forest. Already lace used by her in the head comes as an element of color, to make up the colorful of the mix of races of the country.

== Credits and personnel ==
- Songwriting – Anitta, Poo Bear, Alesso
- Production – Alesso
- Vocal producing and recording – Anitta

== Charts ==
Chart (2017–18)	Peak position
Brazil (Billboard Hot 100)	41
Brazil Hot Pop Songs (Billboard)	1
Brazil Hot Streaming (Pro-Música Brasil)	10
Mexico (Billboard Ingles Airplay)	7
Portugal (AFP)	53
US Hot Dance/Electronic Songs (Billboard)	25

=== Year-end charts ===
Chart (2017)	Position
Brazil Streaming (Pro-Música Brasil)	150

== Release history ==
Region	Date	Format	Version	Label	Ref.
Various	13 October 2017	Digital download	Original	Warner Latina	
United States	31 October 2017	Dance radio	Original	Atlantic	
United States	13 December 2017	Digital download	Remixes	Warner Latina	
Various	13 December 2017	Digital download	3lau remix	Warner Latina	
