= LP1 (Liam Payne album) =

Studio album by Liam Payne
- Released: 6 December 2019
- Recorded: 2016–2019
- Studios: Miami, Florida (Circle House); Los Angeles (Deep Cuts, MXM, Sphere); Calabasas (Enemy Doja); London, UK (Hampton, Real World, Rokstone, SARM); New York City (Jungle City Studios); Sherman Oaks (Monsters and Strangerz); Venice, California (Stellar House); Atlanta, Georgia (YRN Factory)
- Genres: Pop; R&B; EDM; trap
- Length: 54:35
- Labels: Hampton; Capitol
- Producers: Afterhrs; Dylan Bauld; Trevor Dahl; DannyBoyStyles; German; Joe London; Steve Mac; Sir Nolan; Sly; Stargate; Ryan Tedder; The Monsters & Strangerz; Aaron Zuckerman

Liam Payne chronology
First Time (2018)	LP1 (2019)	Midnight Hour (2020)

Singles from LP1
- 1. "Strip That Down" Released: 19 May 2017; 2. "Get Low" Released: 6 July 2017; 3. "Bedroom Floor" Released: 20 October 2017; 4. "Familiar" Released: 20 April 2018; 5. "Stack It Up" Released: 18 September 2019; 6. "All I Want (For Christmas)" Released: 25 October 2019; 7. "Live Forever" Released: 6 December 2019

LP1 is the only solo studio album by the English singer and songwriter Liam Payne. It was released on 6 December 2019 through Hampton Records and Capitol Records and was the only studio album Payne released before his death on 16 October 2024. The album mixes pop and trap music with hip hop and R&B production, and draws influences from Usher and Justin Timberlake. LP1 was preceded by three singles: "Strip That Down", "Get Low" and "Bedroom Floor", and spawned four further singles, post-release: "Familiar", "Stack It Up", "All I Want (For Christmas)" and "Live Forever". Reviews for the record were mixed, according to review aggregator Metacritic, with critics noting how Payne lacked a distinct identity amid the various genres he adopted throughout the track listing.

== Background ==
"I've had so many amazing experiences over the last few years which I've used as inspiration for this record -- it's been a real labor of love. I've worked with some incredibly talented people in the studio to produce an album that truly represents me which I'm very proud of"

— Payne discussing the making of LP1

Following the release of his single "Bedroom Floor" in October 2017, Payne told Hits Radio that his album would be released in January 2018, saying he had worked with Ed Sheeran and that he "didn't really want to nail [him]self down so there's some dark pop on there, some super urban tracks and a lot of trap music". In May 2018, Payne told Good Morning America that the album was to be released on 14 September 2018, and that there was "a good mix of beautiful people on my album, which is amazing". However, in August 2018, Payne announced that he had delayed the release of the album and that he would be releasing his debut EP First Time (2018) to make up for it.

In September 2019, following the release of "Stack It Up", MTV said Payne had "spent much of 2019 in the studio". The same month, Payne revealed to Australian radio station Nova 96.9 that the album was finished, that he was "proud" of it and it is "exactly the way I'd want my first album to sound". He also stated that it is "very hip-hop and R&B-orientated, with lots of artists that I like – an Usher and Justin Timberlake reference throughout".

On 18 October 2019, Payne formally announced the album, its title and that it would be released on 6 December 2019.

This is the only solo studio album Payne released before his death in 2024.

== Music and lyrics ==
"Strip That Down" is a trap and hip hop-influenced pop and R&B track. Payne croons over "pulsating" synth-bass and chants with minimalist production style. Lyrically, the song contains themes of wealth, celebrity appeal and newfound career independence. While talking about the song, Payne said: "It just sets a few things straight, but then also the chorus is more about stripping back the music. I like to hear it loud sometimes, but sometimes you got to strip it back." For the concept of the song, Payne stated that they contemplated what Timberlake would release as his debut solo single in 2017. "Familiar" is a Latin, Latin pop and R&B song. According to Billboard, the song "combines Latin vibes with a summery, R&B sound". The lyrics are about impressing a love interest in a nightclub. "Get Low" is a quick-spaced tropical dance, club-pop song that contains light percussion and a lead tropical house synth line. Amid sexually charged lyrics, Payne talks to a potential lover over "buoyant" synths on the chorus.

== Singles ==
A number of singles were released ahead of the album including: "Strip That Down" featuring Quavo, "Get Low" with Zedd, "Bedroom Floor" and "Familiar" with J Balvin. "For You (Fifty Shades Freed)" with Rita Ora from the Fifty Shades Freed soundtrack, "Polaroid" with Jonas Blue and Lennon Stella from Blue's debut studio album Blue and the Christmas track "All I Want (For Christmas)" are also included as bonus tracks.

"Stack It Up" featuring A Boogie wit da Hoodie was released as the lead single from the album on 16 September 2019. The song "Live Forever" featuring electronic music DJ trio Cheat Codes was also released simultaneously alongside the album on 6 December 2019.

== Critical reception ==
Professional ratings
Aggregate scores
Source	Rating
AnyDecentMusic?	4.4/10
Metacritic	44/100
Review scores
Source	Rating
AllMusic	3/5 stars
The Arts Desk	2/5 stars
Evening Standard	4/5 stars
The Guardian	1/5 stars
i	2/5 stars
The Independent	2/5 stars
NME	2/5 stars
The Observer	2/5 stars
Pitchfork	4.3/10
The Times	2/5 stars

LP1 was met with mixed to negative reviews. According to Metacritic, which assigns a normalised rating out of 100 to reviews from mainstream critics, the album has an average score of 44 out of 100, which indicates "mixed or average reviews" based on seven reviews. It was the worst reviewed album with seven reviews or more of 2019 on the site.

Helen Brown of The Independent wrote "he's got a nice set of pipes. He gets the songs across. But without imposing any personality on them he's just, well, a singing six-pack" and that "it's all fine: shiny and efficient pop, smelling of body oil and new car upholstery. But Payne treats each track like a rental car. He gives each song a spin and hands the keys back like a good lad without leaving a trace," ending the review by stating "he's gone from One Direction to One Dimensional". Mark Kennedy, writing for ABC News, called the album "embarrassing" while writing that the album "never really gets off the ground, a collection of monotonous club songs that often sound like warmed-over Justin Bieber rejects." He further criticised Payne's decision to add "offerings [that] are more than two years old" and the fact that Payne only co-wrote four songs, although he did compliment "Stack It Up". Laura Snapes of The Guardian opined that it is a "terrible pop album, but very effective contraception". Michael Cragg, also of The Guardian, called the album "genre-ticking anonymity" and "occasionally painful yet weirdly Payne-less." El Hunt of NME felt Payne was "so focused on ticking boxes that he forgets to have fun" and that it "shows a more grown-up side to the former One Direction member, and cherry-picks from pretty much every genre that's in vogue right now. The problem is that it doesn't tell us much about Liam Payne" while particularly talking down on "Both Ways". Hunt did, however, note that the album "can be fun when it does loosen up a little more", naming "Familiar", "Heart Meet Break", and "Bedroom Floor" as standout tracks. Rawiya Kameir of Pitchfork was critical, calling Payne "another pop star flailing to find his identity amid trend-hopping production and half-baked lyrics" and that "listening to LP1, you almost feel sorry for Payne. It's maybe more pathetic to have failed not for risking too much, but after seeming to have tried so little."

Neil Z. Yeung of AllMusic wrote that Payne "tackles hip-hop and electronic genres but struggles to distinguish himself from the crop of similar-sounding contemporaries" and that a majority of the songs "sound more like a streaming playlist set to shuffle" while adding that the album is "front-loaded with mostly forgettable trifles" and "saved by this bountiful back-end, which plays like an early prediction of a potential greatest-hits collection" while advising Payne to "find a more distinctive vision and a team who can better utilize his strong vocals." Yeung also added that the album's best tracks include featured artists, particularly praising "For You" as the album's best track while also complimenting "Familiar", "Get Low", and "Stack It Up". Writing for The Times, Will Hodgkinson called the album "dull" but praised Payne's "strong voice". A.D. Amorosi, writing for Variety, opined that "the writing and singing aren't strong enough and come across as C-level Timberlake material" while ending the review by saying "during 'Home with You', one of Payne's better singles not included on this album, the singer claims: 'Too many cooks in the kitchen / Too many fools here listening / Why don't we find somewhere quiet, quiet.' Liam Payne should have taken his own advice." Lauren Murphy of entertainment.ie called the songs "indistinguishable" and the album "a wasted opportunity" and "dull", noting that the album "sounds like a collection of songs – not a cohesive album". Thomas Green, writing for the i, stated that "One Direction's devoted fans will love this, but nobody else will" while commenting that the album "should make lots of money. Not much else about it seems to matter to Payne." He also opined that the second half of the album, "stacked with tunes he's released over the last three years" is "more enjoyable" than the newer releases.

The album specifically received heavy criticism from critics and the general public for fetishising bisexual women in the track "Both Ways".

Some reviews were more positive, with Rachel McGrath of the Evening Standard opining that Payne "finds the perfect middle ground" and writing that the album is "perfectly packaged hits that see him reaffirm his love for hip-hop, dabble with reggaeton and even croon a Christmas track." Markos Papadatos of the Digital Journal penned that the album was "incredible", calling it "worth the wait" and "all heart and soul, and it is highly recommended for all."

== Commercial performance ==
LP1 peaked at number 17 on the UK Albums Chart. It left the Top 50 the next week and spent a further five weeks in the bottom half of the Top 100.

The album debuted and peaked at number 111 on the US Billboard 200.

== Track listing ==
LP1 standard edition track listing
No.	Title	Writer(s)	Producer(s)	Length
1.	"Stack It Up" (featuring A Boogie wit da Hoodie)	Ed Sheeran; Artist Dubose; Steve McCutcheon; Frederik Gibson	Steve Mac	2:45
2.	"Remember"	James Abrahart; Jonathan Price; Stefan Johnson; Jordan Johnson; Marcus Lomax; Oliver Peterhof	The Monsters & Strangerz; German; Jonny Price^{[a]}; Gian Stone^{[v]}	3:09
3.	"Heart Meet Break"	Jake Torrey; Michael Matosic; Joseph Spargur	Joe London	1:56
4.	"Hips Don't Lie"	S. Johnson; J. Johnson; Lomax; Alexander Izquierdo; Peterhof	The Monsters & Strangerz; Ben "Bengineer" Chang^{[r]}	3:28
5.	"Tell Your Friends"	David Brown; Dylan Bauld; Samuel Watters	Dylan Bauld; Sam Watters^{[r]}	3:15
6.	"Say It All"	Liam Payne; Ryan Tedder; Sandy Wilhelm; Mikkel S. Eriksen; Tor Erik Hermansen	Tedder; Stargate	3:27
7.	"Rude Hours"	James Duval; Rudolph Huggins; Daniel Schofield	DannyBoyStyles	3:55
8.	"Live Forever" (featuring Cheat Codes)	Samuel Preston; Evan Kidd Bogart; Sylvester "Sly" Sivertsen	Trevor Dahl; Sly	2:54
9.	"Weekend"	Payne; Aaron Zuckerman; Simon Wilcox; Nolan Lambroza; Shaun Frank	Aaron Zuckerman; Sir Nolan	3:10
10.	"Both Ways"	Payne; Ruth-Anne Cunningham; Stephenie Jones; Ian Franzino; Andrew Haas	Afterhrs	3:18
11.	"Strip That Down" (featuring Quavo)	Payne; Sheeran; McCutcheon; Orville Burrell; Rickardo Ducent; Shaun Pizzonia; Brian Thompson; Sylvester Allen; Harold Ray Brown; Morris Dickerson; Le Roy Lonnie Jordan; Charles William Miller; Lee Oskar; Howard E. Scott; Quavious Marshall	Mac	3:22
12.	"For You (Fifty Shades Freed)" (with Rita Ora)	Alexandra Tamposi; Ali Payami; Andrew Wotman	Payami; Watt; Peter Karlsson	4:02
13.	"Familiar" (with J Balvin)	Gamal Lewis; Sean Douglas; Michael Sabath; José Álvaro Osorio Balvin	Sabath	3:14
14.	"Polaroid" (with Jonas Blue and Lennon Stella)	Guy James Robin; John Paul Cooper; Samuel Romans; Edward Drewett	Robin	3:08
15.	"Get Low" (with Zedd)	Anton Zaslavski; Charles Hinshaw Jr.; Tristan Landymore; Fabienne Holloway	Zedd	3:23
16.	"Bedroom Floor"	Charlie Puth; Jacob Kasher Hindlin; McCutcheon; Ammar Malik; Noel Zancanella; Aaron Jennings	Mac; Ben Rice	3:08
17.	"All I Want (For Christmas)"	James Newman; Preston; Phil Cook	Cook	3:01
Total length:				54:35

Target edition bonus tracks
No.	Title	Writer(s)	Producer(s)	Length
17.	"Hurting Me"	Payne; Wotman; Wilcox; McCutcheon	Watt	3:28
18.	"Before It Ends"	Payne; David Gibson; Franzino; Haas	Afterhrs	3:44
19.	"All I Want (For Christmas)"	Newman; Preston; Cook	Cook	3:01
Total length:				63:36

Japanese edition bonus tracks
No.	Title	Writer(s)	Producer(s)	Length
17.	"Down"	S. Johnson; J. Johnson; Lomax; Eriksen; Hermansen	The Monsters & Strangerz; Stargate; Ben Rice	3:32
18.	"Trouble"	Payne; Ronald Spencer; Zuckerman	Spencer; Jeremy Zucker	2:56
19.	"Nobody Else"	Payne; Eriksen; Hermansen; Ilsey Juber; Wilcox; Lambroza	Stargate; Sir Nolan	2:48
20.	"All I Want (For Christmas)"	Newman; Preston; Cook	Cook	3:01
Total length:				68:33

2020 digital reissue bonus track
No.	Title	Writer(s)	Producer(s)	Length
1.	"Midnight" (Alesso featuring Liam Payne)	Alessandro Lindblad; Carl Lehmann; Emanuel Abrahamsson; Neil Ormandy; Nirob Islam	Alesso; Hoskins	3:40
Total length:				58:24

=== Notes ===
- ^{^[a]}signifies an additional producer
- ^{^[v]}signifies a vocal producer
- ^{^[r]}signifies a recording producer

== Credits and personnel ==
Credits adapted from the album's liner notes.

=== Recording locations ===
- Miami, Florida – Circle House Studios
- Los Angeles, California – Deep Cuts, MXM Studios, Sphere Studios
- Calabasas, California – Enemy Doja
- London, United Kingdom – Hampton Studios, Real World Studios, Rokstone Studios, SARM Studios
- New York City – Jungle City Studios
- Sherman Oaks, California – Monsters and Strangerz Studios
- Venice, California – Stellar House
- Atlanta, Georgia – YRN Factory

=== Vocals ===
- Liam Payne – vocals (all tracks), backing vocals (track 10)
- A Boogie wit da Hoodie – vocals (track 1)
- Ruth-Anne Cunningham – backing vocals (track 10)
- Andrew Haas – backing vocals (track 10)
- Marcus Lomax – backing vocals (track 4)
- Michael Matosic – backing vocals (track 3)
- Sam Preston – backing vocals (track 8)
- Ed Sheeran – backing vocals (track 1, 10)
- Jake Torrey – backing vocals (track 3)

=== Instrumentation ===
- Oscar Sebastian Enroth – guitar (track 8)
- Ian Franzino – drums, keyboards (track 10)
- Fred – bass guitar, drums, guitar, piano (track 1)
- Andrew Haas – bass guitar, drums, guitar, keyboards (track 10)
- Stefan Johnson – guitar (track 1)
- Steve Mac – keyboards (track 1)
- Jonny Price – piano (track 2)
- Tobias Ring – production (track 8)
- Joe Spargur – bass guitar, guitar, keyboards (track 3)
- Jake Torrey – guitar, keyboards (track 3)

=== Production ===
- Afterhrs – production (track 10)
- Dylan Bauld – production (track 5)
- Trevor Dahl – production (track 8)
- DannyBoyStyles – production (track 7)
- German – production (track 2)
- Joe London – production (track 3)
- Sir Nolan – production (track 9)
- Sly – production (track 8)
- Steve Mac – production (track 1)
- Stargate – production (track 6)
- Ryan Tedder – production (track 6)
- The Monsters and the Strangerz – production (track 2, 4)
- Aaron Zuckerman – production (track 9)
- Jonny Price – additional production (track 2)
- Ben "Bengineer" Chang – recording production (track 4)
- Sam Watters – recording production (track 5)
- Gian Stone – vocal production (track 2)

=== Technical ===
- Ben "Bengineer" Chang – engineering, recording (track 7)
- Ian Franzino – engineering, programming, recording (track 10)
- Andrew Haas – engineering, programming, recording (track 10)
- John Hanes – engineering (track 8)
- Daniel Pursey – engineering (track 1)
- Sir Nolan – engineering, drum programming, programming (track 9)
- Gian Stone – engineering (track 2)
- Connor Mason – assistant recording engineering (track 10)
- Jeff Gunnell – assistant recording engineering (track 10)
- Bill Zimmerman – assistant recording engineering (track 1–2), mix engineering (track 3), engineering (track 4–6), assistant editing (track 10)
- Aaron Zuckerman – assistant recording engineering, drum programming, programming (9)
- Ben Rice – vocal engineering (track 3)
- DannyBoyStyles – programming (track 7)
- Chris Laws – programming (track 1)
- Joe Spargur – programming (track 3)
- Stargate – programming, recording (track 6)
- The Monsters and the Strangerz – programming (track 2, 4)
- Sandy Vee – programming, recording (track 6)
- Serge Courtois – mixing (track 9)
- Serban Ghenea – mixing (track 8)
- Phil Tan – mixing (track 1–6, 10)
- Randy Merrill – mastering

=== Design ===
- Big Active – art direction and design
- Jason Hetherington – photography

== Charts ==
2019–2020 chart performance for LP1
Chart (2019–2020)	Peak position
Argentine Albums (CAPIF)	5
Australian Albums (ARIA)	50
Belgian Albums (Ultratop Flanders)	124
Belgian Albums (Ultratop Wallonia)	128
Canadian Albums (Billboard)	70
French Albums (SNEP)	153
German Albums (Offizielle Top 100)	91
Irish Albums (IRMA)	69
Japanese Albums (Oricon)	124
Portuguese Albums (AFP)	45
Scottish Albums (Official Charts)	34
Spanish Albums (PROMUSICAE)	41
Swiss Albums (Schweizer Hitparade)	100
UK Albums (Official Charts)	17
US Billboard 200	111

2024 chart performance for LP1
Chart (2024)	Peak position
Belgian Albums (Ultratop Flanders)	82
Dutch Albums (Album Top 100)	82
UK Albums (Official Charts)	62

== Certifications ==
Certifications and sales for LP1
Region	Certification	Certified units/sales
Canada (Music Canada)	Platinum	80,000^{‡}
New Zealand (RMNZ)	Gold	7,500^{‡}
Poland (ZPAV)	Gold	10,000^{‡}
United Kingdom (BPI)	Gold	100,000^{‡}
^{‡} Sales+streaming figures based on certification alone.

== Release history ==
Release history for LP1
Region	Date	Format	Label	Ref.
Various	6 December 2019	Digital download; streaming; cassette; CD; LP (standard, clear, blue, pink and picture)	Capitol	
United Kingdom	6 December 2019	CD (signed)	Capitol	
