= Midnight (Alesso song) =

Single by Alesso featuring Liam Payne

from the EP Midnight Hour
- Released: 8 April 2020
- Length: 3:40
- Label: Alefune
- Songwriters: Alessandro Lindblad; Carl Lehmann; Emanuel Abrahamsson; Neil Ormandy; Nirob Islam
- Producers: Alesso; Hoskins

Alesso singles chronology
"One Last Time" (2020)	"Midnight" (2020)	"The End" (2020)

Liam Payne singles chronology
"Live Forever" (2019)	"Midnight" (2020)	"Naughty List" (2020)

"Midnight" is a song by Swedish DJ and record producer Alesso, featuring vocals from British singer Liam Payne. It was released as a single on 8 April 2020. The song appears as a streaming bonus track on Liam Payne's debut studio album LP1.

== Background ==
"During these difficult times Liam and I hope this song can bring some light. Just like everyone else, we're trying to figure out a way to finish this song and video. We came up with this idea for fans to be a part of the official remix… We never thought there were gonna be so many people submitting, which makes this super, super exciting."

— Alesso, "Liam Payne, Alesso Filmed 'Midnight' Video in Quarantine", Rolling Stone

== Music video ==
A music video to accompany the release of "Midnight" was first released onto YouTube on 7 April 2020. The video was filmed in March 2020 and shows the two artists performing the song in separate studios, with Alesso in Los Angeles and Payne in London, Payne also performs the song on a rooftop garden.

== Track listing ==
Digital download and stream
No.	Title	Length
1.	"Midnight" (featuring Liam Payne)	3:40

Digital download
No.	Title	Length
1.	"Midnight" (featuring Liam Payne) (Jack Wins Remix)	3:50

Digital download
No.	Title	Length
1.	"Midnight" (featuring Liam Payne) (Rompasso Remix)	3:26

Digital download
No.	Title	Length
1.	"Midnight" (featuring Liam Payne) (Alesso & ESH Remix)	3:38
2.	"Midnight" (featuring Liam Payne) (Vicetone Remix)	3:28
3.	"Midnight" (featuring Liam Payne) (Magnificence Remix)	5:20
4.	"Midnight" (featuring Liam Payne) (Sylvain Armand & Kiko Franco Remix)	4:17

== Midnight Hour ==
Midnight Hour

EP by Alesso and Liam Payne
- Released: October 9, 2020
- Length: 21:21
- Label: Universal Music Japan
- Producer: Alesso; Hoskins; Nico; Vinz; Trevor Dahl; Sly; Andrew Watt; Ali Payami; Peter Karlsson; Afterhrs

Alesso chronology
Forever (2015)	Midnight Hour (2020)

Liam Payne chronology
LP1 (2019)	Midnight Hour (2020)

Singles from Midnight Hour
- 1. "I Wanna Know" Released: 1 April 2016; 2. "Let Me Go" Released: 8 September 2017; 3. "Remedy" Released: 31 August 2018; 4. "Midnight" Released: 8 April 2020

Midnight Hour is a collaborative extended play by Swedish DJ and producer Alesso and British singer Liam Payne. It was released on October 9, 2020, by UMG Recordings. The EP features collaborations with Sylvain Armand, Kiko Franco, Nico & Vinz, Cheat Codes, Hailee Steinfeld, Florida Georgia Line, Watt and Rita Ora.

=== Track listing ===
Midnight Hour track listing
No.	Title	Writer(s)	Producer(s)	Length
1.	"Midnight" (Alesso featuring Liam Payne; Sylvain Armand and Kiko Franco remix)	Alessandro Lindblad; Carl Lehmann; Emanuel Abrahamsson; Neil Ormandy; Nirob Islam	Alesso; Hoskins	4:17
2.	"I Wanna Know" (Alesso featuring Nico & Vinz)	Linblad; Kahouly Nicolay Sereba; Vincent Dery	Alesso; Nico & Vinz	4:00
3.	"Live Forever" (Liam Payne and Cheat Codes)	Samuel Preston; Evan Kidd Bogart; Sylvester Siversten	Trevor Dahl; Sly	2:54
4.	"Let Me Go" (Hailee Steinfeld and Alesso featuring Florida Georgia Line and Watt)	Lindblad; Andrew Wotman; Alexandra Tamposi; Brian Lee; Jamie Lidell	Alesso; Andrew Watt	2:54
5.	"For You" (Liam Payne and Rita Ora)	Ali Payami; Tamposi; Wotman	Ali Payami; Watt; Peter Karlsson	4:04
6.	"Remedy" (Alesso)	Andrew Haas; Alma Guðmundsdóttir; Lindblad; Jake Torrey; Ian Franzino	Alesso; Afterhrs	3:10
Total length:				21:21

== Personnel ==
Credits adapted from Tidal.

- Alessandro Lindblad – Producer, composer, lyricist, associated performer, programming
- Hoskins – Producer, additional producer
- Carl Lehmann – Composer, lyricist, acoustic guitar, associated performer, background vocalist
- Emanuel Abrahamsson – Composer, lyricist
- Neil Ormandy – Composer, lyricist
- Nirob Islam – Composer, lyricist
- Liam Payne – Associated performer, featured artist, vocals
- Ryan Shanahan – Mixer, studio personnel

== Charts ==
=== Weekly charts ===
Chart (2020)	Peak position
Belgium (Ultratip Bubbling Under Flanders)	2
Belgium (Ultratip Bubbling Under Wallonia)	33
Canadian Digital Song Sales (Billboard)	45
CIS Airplay (TopHit)	98
CIS Airplay (TopHit) Rompasso Remix	67
Czech Republic Airplay (ČNS IFPI)	16
Netherlands (Dutch Top 40 Tiparade)	10
New Zealand Hot Singles (RMNZ)	3
Russia Airplay (TopHit)	86
Russia Airplay (TopHit) Rompasso Remix	57
Sweden (Sverigetopplistan)	60
Switzerland (Schweizer Hitparade)	97
US Hot Dance/Electronic Songs (Billboard)	8
US Digital Song Sales (Billboard)	27

=== Monthly charts ===
Monthly chart performance for "Midnight"
Chart (2020)	Peak position
CIS Airplay (TopHit) Rompasso Remix	83
Czech Republic (Rádio Top 100)	23
Russia Airplay (TopHit) Rompasso Remix	75

=== Year-end charts ===
Chart (2020)	Position
US Hot Dance/Electronic Songs (Billboard)	25

== Certifications ==
Region	Certification	Certified units/sales
Brazil (Pro-Música Brasil)	Platinum	40,000^{‡}
Canada (Music Canada)	Gold	40,000^{‡}
New Zealand (RMNZ)	Gold	15,000^{‡}
United States (RIAA)	Gold	500,000^{‡}
^{‡} Sales+streaming figures based on certification alone.

== Release history ==
Region	Date	Format	Label	Ref.
Various	8 April 2020	Digital download; streaming	Alefune	
