= Familiar (song) =

Single by Liam Payne and J Balvin

from the album LP1
- Language: English; Spanish
- Released: 20 April 2018
- Genre: Latin pop; R&B
- Length: 3:16
- Label: Capitol
- Songwriters: Gamal "LunchMoney" Lewis; Mike Sabath; José Álvaro Osorio Balvin; Sean Douglas
- Producer: Sabath

Liam Payne singles chronology
"For You" (2018)	"Familiar" (2018)	"First Time" (2018)

J Balvin singles chronology
"Ambiente" (2018)	"Familiar" (2018)	"Positivo" (2018)

Music video
- "Familiar" on YouTube

"Familiar" is a song recorded by the English singer Liam Payne and Colombian singer J Balvin. It was written and produced by Mike Sabath, with additional writing from LunchMoney Lewis, Balvin and Sean Douglas. The song was released on 20 April 2018 and appears as a bonus track on Payne's first solo album LP1.

== Release ==
On 25 February 2018, the artists announced the song on social media while they were shooting the music video in Miami. Payne revealed the song's cover art and release date on 16 April. He also tweeted a video featuring some of the lyrics, writing: "[Balvin,] you're gonna have to teach some of my fans Spanish..." He unveiled a snippet of the song on 19 April, which features J Balvin ad-libbing.

== Composition ==
"Familiar" is a Latin, Latin pop and R&B song. According to Billboard, the song "combines Latin vibes with a summery, R&B sound". The lyrics are about impressing a love interest in a nightclub.

== Critical reception ==
Mike Nied of Idolator opined that the song could easily become Payne's "best track yet", writing that "the Latin-tinged crossover hit is sure to storm the charts across the globe and may become his most successful release to date". He also noted Payne's vocal of being "velvety" and "enticing", before praising the song's "internationally appealing production". Shanté Honeycutt of Billboard said, "upon first listen, [the song] induces flashbacks to Justin Timberlake's "Señorita" [...] as does the video," though she also considered Payne and Balvin "made a hit" all on their own. Rianne Houghton of Digital Spy regarded the song as "an excellent attempt at recreating 'Despacito'".

== Music video ==
The song's music video was released on 4 May 2018, directed by Mark Klasferf. In the video, Liam is seen dancing shirtless and mingling with women.

== Live performances ==
Payne and J Balvin performed "Familiar" on 15 May 2018 on Good Morning America, and on The Late Show with Stephen Colbert on 17 May 2018.

== Credits and personnel ==
Credits adapted from Tidal.

- Liam Payne – vocals
- J Balvin – vocals, composition
- LunchMoney – composition
- Mike Sabath – composition, production, guitar
- Sean Douglas – composition
- Randy Merrill – master engineering
- John Hanes – engineering
- Serban Ghenea – mixing

== Charts ==
=== Weekly charts ===
Chart (2018)	Peak position
Argentina Anglo (Monitor Latino)	3
Australia (ARIA)	95
Austria (Ö3 Austria Top 40)	65
Belarus Airplay (Eurofest)	61
Belgium (Ultratip Bubbling Under Flanders)	23
Belgium (Ultratop 50 Wallonia)	10
Canada Hot 100 (Billboard)	61
CIS Airplay (TopHit)	41
Colombia Anglo (National-Report)	4
Croatia International Airplay (Top lista)	15
Czech Republic Airplay (ČNS IFPI)	59
Czech Republic Singles Digital (ČNS IFPI)	39
Ecuador (National-Report)	83
France (SNEP)	103
Germany (GfK)	50
Hungary (Rádiós Top 40)	31
Hungary (Single Top 40)	20
Hungary (Stream Top 40)	21
Ireland (IRMA)	22
Lebanon Airplay (Lebanese Top 20)	8
Mexico Airplay (Billboard)	10
Netherlands (Dutch Top 40)	35
New Zealand Heatseekers (RMNZ)	9
Poland Airplay (ZPAV)	13
Portugal (AFP)	52
Romania (Airplay 100)	29
Russia Airplay (TopHit)	63
Scottish Singles Sales (Official Charts)	9
Slovakia Airplay (ČNS IFPI)	73
Slovakia Singles Digital (ČNS IFPI)	19
Slovenia (SloTop50)	36
Spain (PROMUSICAE)	65
Sweden (Sverigetopplistan)	46
Switzerland (Schweizer Hitparade)	52
Ukraine Airplay (TopHit)	104
UK Singles (Official Charts)	14
US Bubbling Under Hot 100 (Billboard)	19
US Pop Airplay (Billboard)	25
Venezuela (National-Report)	54

=== Year-end charts ===
Chart (2018)	Position
Belgium (Ultratop Wallonia)	69
Hungary (Rádiós Top 40)	99
Iceland (Plötutíóindi)	52
UK Singles (Official Charts Company)	91

== Certifications ==
Region	Certification	Certified units/sales
Brazil (Pro-Música Brasil)	Platinum	40,000^{‡}
Canada (Music Canada)	Platinum	80,000^{‡}
Mexico (AMPROFON)	Gold	30,000^{‡}
Poland (ZPAV)	Platinum	50,000^{‡}
Spain (Promusicae)	Gold	30,000^{‡}
United Kingdom (BPI)	Platinum	600,000^{‡}
^{‡} Sales+streaming figures based on certification alone.

== Release history ==
Region	Date	Format	Label	Ref.
Various	20 April 2018	Digital download	Capitol	
United States	1 May 2018	Contemporary hit radio	Republic	
United States	1 May 2018	Rhythmic contemporary radio	Republic	
Italy	4 May 2018	Contemporary hit radio	Universal	
