= Lennon Stella =

Canadian singer and actress (born 1999)

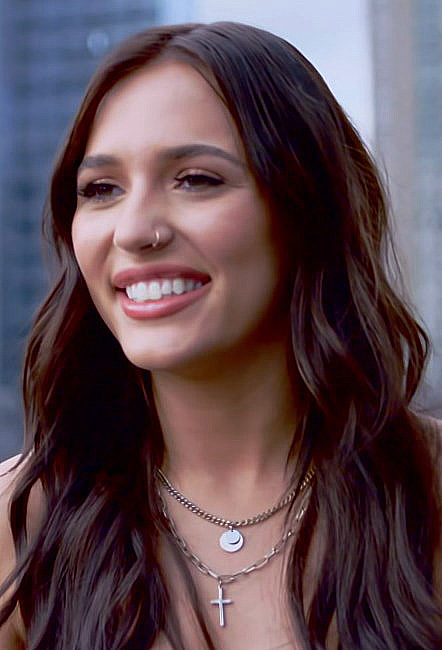
- Stella in 2018
- Born: Lennon Ray Louise Stella; August 13, 1999 (age 27); Oshawa, Ontario, Canada
- Occupations: Singer; actress
- Years active: 2012–present
- Parents: Brad Stella (father); MaryLynne Stella (mother)
- Relatives: Maisy Stella (sister)
- Musical career
- Genres: Pop; indie pop; R&B
- Labels: Records; Columbia
- Formerly of: Lennon & Maisy
- Website: lennonstella.com

Lennon Ray Louise Stella is a Canadian-American singer and actress. She portrayed Maddie Conrad on the musical-drama series Nashville (2012–2018). Before going solo in 2018, Stella performed with her sister as the duo Lennon & Maisy. Stella released her debut EP, Love, Me, in 2018. She released her debut studio album in 2020. In an Instagram story posted on November 2, 2026, Stella confirmed that she had become a U.S. citizen earlier that year.

== Career ==
=== 2012–2018: Early work, acting and Love, Me ===
Stella began her career performing alongside younger sister Maisy Stella as part of the duo Lennon & Maisy. She starred as Maddie Conrad in the six-season musical soap opera series Nashville (2012–2018), and wrote and performed a number of songs for the soundtrack.

In January 2018, it was announced that Stella had signed a record deal with Records and Columbia Records. In 2018, Stella featured on the track "Polaroid" with Jonas Blue and Liam Payne. On November 16, 2018, she released her debut extended play, Love, Me, featuring previously released singles "Bad", "Breakaway", and "Fortress", marking the start of her solo music career.

=== 2019–present: Established solo music career and Three. Two. One. ===
In May and June 2019, Stella opened for Anne-Marie on her Speak Your Mind Tour. She collaborated with The Chainsmokers and Illenium for a single titled "Takeaway", which was released on July 24, 2019. That same year, she toured as an opening act with 5 Seconds of Summer for the Chainsmokers' World War Joy Tour. In February 2020, she won a Juno Award for Breakthrough Artist of the Year, making this the first award she has received.

Stella's debut solo album, Three. Two. One. (2020), was praised by critics and achieved commercial success. In The Observer, critic Kitty Empire calls it "strikingly serene". In Exclaim!, Ariel Matheson gives it an 8/10 and calls it a "feminine powerhouse". It reached number 80 on the US Billboard 200 and appeared on numerous other charts, while the single "Kissing Other People" was certified gold by the Recording Industry Association of America (RIAA).

In 2021, Stella released two solo songs: "Fancy" and "Bubble". She also collaborated with American singer Adam Melchor on "Light Year" and wrote "Touch and Go" alongside Melchor, which was included in his 2022 album. The same year, Stella wrote and recorded an original song alongside her younger sister for the soundtrack of the HBO Max film The Fallout. The song, "While You Sleep", was released in early 2022. In January 2022, she performed a cover of "Hey, Beautiful" by The Solids as the theme song for the series How I Met Your Father.

In August 2026, Stella announced her second studio album, Sleeping Lion. The lead single, "Unforgivable Things", was released on August 27, 2026. Sleeping Lion was released on October 23, 2026.

== Artistry ==
Lennon Stella is mainly described as an indie pop and pop musician whose music is "R&B tinged". Her debut EP is described as a dance-club record.

== Discography ==
=== Studio albums ===
List of studio albums, with selected details
Title	Album details	Peak chart positions					
Title	Album details	CAN	AUS	NZ	SCO	UK	US
Three. Two. One.	Released: April 24, 2020; Label: Records, Columbia; Format: Digital download, streaming	10	54	30	54	91	80
Sleeping Lion	Released: October 23, 2026; Label: Records; Format: Digital download, streaming	—	—	—	—	—	—

=== Extended plays ===
List of extended plays, with selected details
Title	EP details	Peak chart positions
Title	EP details	CAN
Love, Me	Released: November 16, 2018; Label: Records, Columbia; Format: Digital download, streaming	60
Three. Two. One. (Alternate Versions)	Released: August 7, 2020; Label: Records, Columbia; Format: Digital download, streaming	—

=== Singles ===
==== As lead artist ====
List of singles as lead artist, with selected chart positions, showing year released and album name
Title	Year	Peak chart positions										Certifications	Album
Title	Year	CAN	BEL (FL) Tip	FRA	IRE	JPN	NZ	SCO	SWI	UK	US	Certifications	Album
"Like Everybody Else"	2018	—	—	—	—	—	—	—	—	—	—		Non-album single
"Bad"	2018	—	—	—	—	—	—	—	—	—	—	MC: Gold	Love, Me
"Polaroid" (with Jonas Blue and Liam Payne)	2018	— (Note: "Polaroid" did not enter the Canadian Hot 100 but peaked at number 50 on the Canadian Hot Digital Songs Chart.)	29	183	22	63	— (Note: "Polaroid" did not enter the NZ Top 40 Singles chart but peaked at number 16 on the NZ Hot Singles Chart.)	3	96	12	— (Note: "Polaroid" did not enter the Billboard Hot 100 but peaked at number 1 on the Dance Club Songs Chart and number 16 on the Hot Dance/Electronic Songs Chart.)	MC: Platinum; ARIA: Platinum; BPI: Platinum; RIAA: Gold; RMNZ: Gold	Blue and LP1
"Breakaway"	2018	—	—	—	—	—	—	—	—	—	—		Love, Me
"La Di Da"	2018	49	—	—	—	—	—	—	—	—	—	MC: Platinum; RIAA: Gold; RMNZ: Gold	Love, Me
"Feelings"	2018	—	—	—	—	—	—	—	—	—	—		Love, Me
"Bitch (Takes One to Know One)"	2019	—	—	—	—	—	—	—	—	—	—		Non-album single
"Kissing Other People"	2019	60	—	—	—	—	—	—	—	—	—	MC: Platinum; RIAA: Gold	Three. Two. One
"Golf on TV" (featuring JP Saxe)	2020	—	—	—	—	—	—	—	—	—	—		Three. Two. One
"Jealous"	2020	—	—	—	—	—	—	—	—	—	—		Three. Two. One
"Fear of Being Alone"	2020	—	—	—	—	—	— (Note: "Fear of Being Alone" did not enter the NZ Top 40 Singles Chart, but peaked at number 31 on the NZ Hot Singles Chart.)	—	—	—	—		Three. Two. One
"Older Than I Am"	2020	—	—	—	—	—	— (Note: "Older Than I Am" did not enter the NZ Top 40 Singles Chart, but peaked at number 16 on the NZ Heatseeker Singles Chart.)	—	—	—	—		Three. Two. One
"Summer Feelings" (featuring Charlie Puth)	2020	96	—	—	—	—	—	72	—	79	—	MC: Gold; RMNZ: Gold	Scoob! The Album
"Fancy"	2021	—	—	—	—	—	—	—	—	—	—		Non-album singles
"Bubble"	2021	—	—	—	—	—	—	—	—	—	—		Non-album singles
"Unforgivable Things"	2026	—	—	—	—	—	—	—	—	—	—		Sleeping Lion
"Comedy Show"	2026	—	—	—	—	—	—	—	—	—	—		Sleeping Lion
"—" denotes releases that did not chart or were not released in that territory.

==== As featured artist ====
List of singles as featured artist, with selected chart positions, showing year released and album name
Title	Year	Peak chart positions										Certifications	Album
Title	Year	CAN	AUS	FRA	GER	IRE	NOR	SWE	SWI	UK	US	Certifications	Album
"Takeaway" (The Chainsmokers and Illenium featuring Lennon Stella)	2019	31	32	136	30	41	14	38	36	64	69	MC: Platinum; ARIA: Platinum; BPI: Silver; BVMI: Gold; IFPI SWI: Gold; RIAA: 2× Platinum; RMNZ: Platinum; SNEP: Gold	World War Joy and Ascend
"Light Year" (Adam Melchor featuring Lennon Stella)	2021	—	—	—	—	—	—	—	—	—	—		Non-album single
"One Less Question" (Madi Diaz featuring Lennon Stella)	2024	—	—	—	—	—	—	—	—	—	—		Non-album single
"—" denotes releases that did not chart or were not released in that territory.

==== Promotional singles ====
List of promotional singles, showing year released and album name
Title	Year	Album
"Happy Xmas (War Is Over)" (with Marc Scibilia)	2016	Non-album promotional single
"Workin' On It" (Meghan Trainor featuring Lennon Stella and Sasha Sloan)	2019	Treat Myself
"Every Time You Go Away" (with Kevin Garrett)	2020	Non-album singles
"Hey Beautiful"	2022	Non-album singles
"Thank You"	2022	Non-album singles
"Merry Christmas, Darling"	2022	Non-album singles
"Time After Time"	2023	Non-album singles

=== Other appearances ===
Title	Year	Album
"Love Can Kill"	2019	For the Throne: Music Inspired by the HBO Series Game of Thrones
"Hey Beautiful"	2022	Hey Beautiful (from How I Met Your Father)
"Little Blue" (Featuring Brandi Carlile)	2024	Djesse Vol. 4

=== Music videos ===
List of music videos, showing year released and directors
Title	Year	Other artist(s)	Director(s)	Ref.
As lead artist
"Bad"	2018	None	Blythe Thomas	
"Polaroid"	2018	Jonas Blue, Liam Payne	Jay Martin	
"Breakaway"	2018	None	Gus Black	
"La Di Da"	2018	None	Unknown	
"Feelings"	2018	None	Blythe Thomas	
"Bitch (Takes One to Know One)"	2019	None	Drew Kirsch	
"Kissing Other People"	2020	None	Sean Matsuyama	
"Jealous"	2020	None	Alex Nicholson	
"Fear of Being Alone"	2020	None	CeCe Dawson	
"Older Than I Am"	2020	None	Unknown	
As featured artist
"Takeaway"	2019	The Chainsmokers, Illenium	Jeremiah Davis	

== Tours ==
=== Headlining ===
- Love, Me Tour (2019)
- Lennon Stella: Live in Concert (2019–20)
- Three. Two. One: The Tour (2020) [CANCELED]

=== Festivals ===
- Lollapalooza (2019)
- Bonnaroo Music Festival (2020)

=== Supporting ===
- Speak Your Mind Tour – Anne-Marie (2019)
- World War Joy Tour – The Chainsmokers (2019)

== Filmography ==
Television
Title	Year	Role	Notes
Nashville	2012–18	Maddie Conrad	Recurring role (Season 1); Main role (Season 2–6); 105 episodes
