= First Time (EP) =

EP by Liam Payne
- Released: 24 August 2018
- Genre: Pop; R&B
- Length: 12:33
- Label: Capitol
- Producer: Di Genius; Burns; Jason Gill; Steve Fitzmaurice; Cutfather; Mdl; Sly

Liam Payne chronology
First Time (2018)	LP1 (2019)

Singles from First Time
- 1. "First Time" Released: 24 August 2018

First Time is the first extended play by the English singer Liam Payne. Primarily produced by Di Genius, Burns, Jason Gill, Steve Fitzmaurice, Cutfather, MdL and Sly, it was released on 24 August 2018 by Capitol Records. Its title track, which features a guest appearance from American hip hop recording artist French Montana, was released on the same day as its lead single.

== Background ==
In May 2017, Payne revealed that he had begun working on his first studio album. He was working with Ed Sheeran with an expected release date in January 2018, before it was pushed to 14 September 2018. However, on 16 August 2018, Payne announced that he was delaying the release of his debut studio album and decided to put out an EP instead. He also announced the release date of the EP. He posted a message on his social media, saying:

"As you may know, the last few months have seen some big changes for me ...I looked at some of the songs on my album which were done a while ago and they felt from another age. I'm determined for my debut album to truly represent me.

I'm now back in the studio working hard to finalise the final few new songs on the record - I'm genuinely excited about the music I'm writing and recording and I can't wait for it to be ready for you all.

In the meantime, this EP is a collection of songs that I'm really proud of and want you all to hear... tell me what you think. As always, thanks for your support - it means the world to me."

The EP contains four tracks, "Home with You", "Depend On It", "Slow" and the EP's lead single, "First Time".

== Critical reception ==
First Time was met with positive reviews from music critics. Chloe Gilke of Uproxx stated that the opening track "First Time", was Payne's "best iteration of club pop to date," feeling that "it could be a cut off Drake's Scorpion. She also described "Depend On It" as a "lovely and heartbreaking ballad." However, she was critical on "Home with You" calling it "a bit of a snooze." Patrick Hosken of MTV noted that the EP "is primarily a showcase for Payne's voice."

== Chart performance ==
First Time the best-selling EP in the UK UK Singles Chart. However, the lead single peaked at number 68 on the UK Singles Downloads Chart. The EP peaked at number 12 on the US Digital Albums chart and number two on the US Heatseekers Albums chart.

== Track listing ==
No.	Title	Writer(s)	Producer(s)	Length
1.	"First Time" (with French Montana)	Karim Kharbouch; Stephen McGregor; Johnny Yukon; Matthew Burns	Di Genius; Burns	3:12
2.	"Home with You"	Justin Tranter; Jason Gill; Brandon Skeie	Gill	3:01
3.	"Depend On It"	Robert McCurdy; Christopher Petrosino; Asia Whiteacre	Steve Fitzmaurice	2:51
4.	"Slow"	Sam Preston; Carl Lehmann; Sylvester Sivertsen	Cutfather; MdL; Sly	3:29
Total length:				12:33

== Personnel ==
Credits adapted from Tidal.

- Liam Payne – vocals (all tracks)
- French Montana – vocals (track 1)
- Di Genius – production (track 1)
- Burns – production (track 1)
- Randy Merrill – master engineering (all tracks)
- Oak Felder – engineering (track 1)
- Jacob Richards – mixing assistance (track 1)
- David Nakaji – mixing assistance (track 1)
- Rashawn Mclean – mixing assistance (track 1)
- Jaycen Joshua – mixing (track 1)
- Jason Gill – production (track 2), bass guitar (track 2), drums (track 2), record engineering (track 2), synthesizer programming (track 2)
- Phil Tan – mixing (track 2, 4)
- Benjamin Rice – record engineering (track 2)
- Brandon Skeie – additional vocals (track 2)
- Steve Fitzmaurice – production (track 3), record engineering (track 3)
- Darren Heelis – bass guitar (track 3), mixing (track 3)
- Jules Gulon – mixing assistance (track 3)
- Will Purton – record engineering assistance (track 3)
- Reuben James – piano (track 3)
- Ben "Bengineer" Chang – vocal production (track 3)
- Cutfather – production (track 4)
- MdL – production (track 4)
- Sly – production (track 4)
- Bill Zimmerman – engineering (track 4)

== Charts ==
Chart (2018)	Peak position
US Digital Albums (Billboard)	12
US Heatseekers Albums (Billboard)	2
US Top Album Sales (Billboard)	40

== Release history ==
Release history for First Time
Region	Date	Format	Label	Ref.
Various	24 August 2018	Digital download; streaming	Capitol	
