= Strip That Down =

Single by Liam Payne featuring Quavo

from the album LP1
- Released: 19 May 2017
- Studio: Abbey Road, London
- Genre: Pop-rap; R&B
- Length: 3:24
- Label: Capitol; Republic
- Composers: Steve Mac; Orville Burrell^{[13]}; Rickardo Ducent^{[13]}; Shaun Pizzonia^{[13]}; Brian Thompson^{[13]}; Sylvester Allen^{[13]}; Harold Ray Brown^{[13]}; Morris Dickerson^{[13]}; Le Roy Lonnie Jordan^{[13]}; Charles William Miller^{[13]}; Lee Oskar^{[13]}; Howard E. Scott^{[13]}
- Lyricists: Liam Payne; Ed Sheeran; Quavious Marshall
- Producer: Steve Mac

Liam Payne singles chronology
"Strip That Down" (2017)	"Get Low" (2017)

Quavo singles chronology
"Portland" (2017)	"Strip That Down" (2017)	"Know No Better" (2017)

Music video
- "Strip That Down" on YouTube

"Strip That Down" is the debut solo single by the English singer-songwriter Liam Payne featuring American rapper Quavo. It was released on 19 May 2017, via Capitol Records in the UK and Republic Records in the US. Ed Sheeran, who contributes additional vocals to the song, and producer Steve Mac contributed to the writing. It was serviced to US contemporary hit radio on 23 May 2017. The song's accompanying music video was released on 2 June 2017. The lyrical content is supposed to reflect Payne's freedom to venture into raunchy musical elements after departing from the British-Irish boy band One Direction. The song appears as a bonus track on Payne's debut studio album LP1. As of October 2024, it has sold 11.5 million units worldwide.

== Background ==
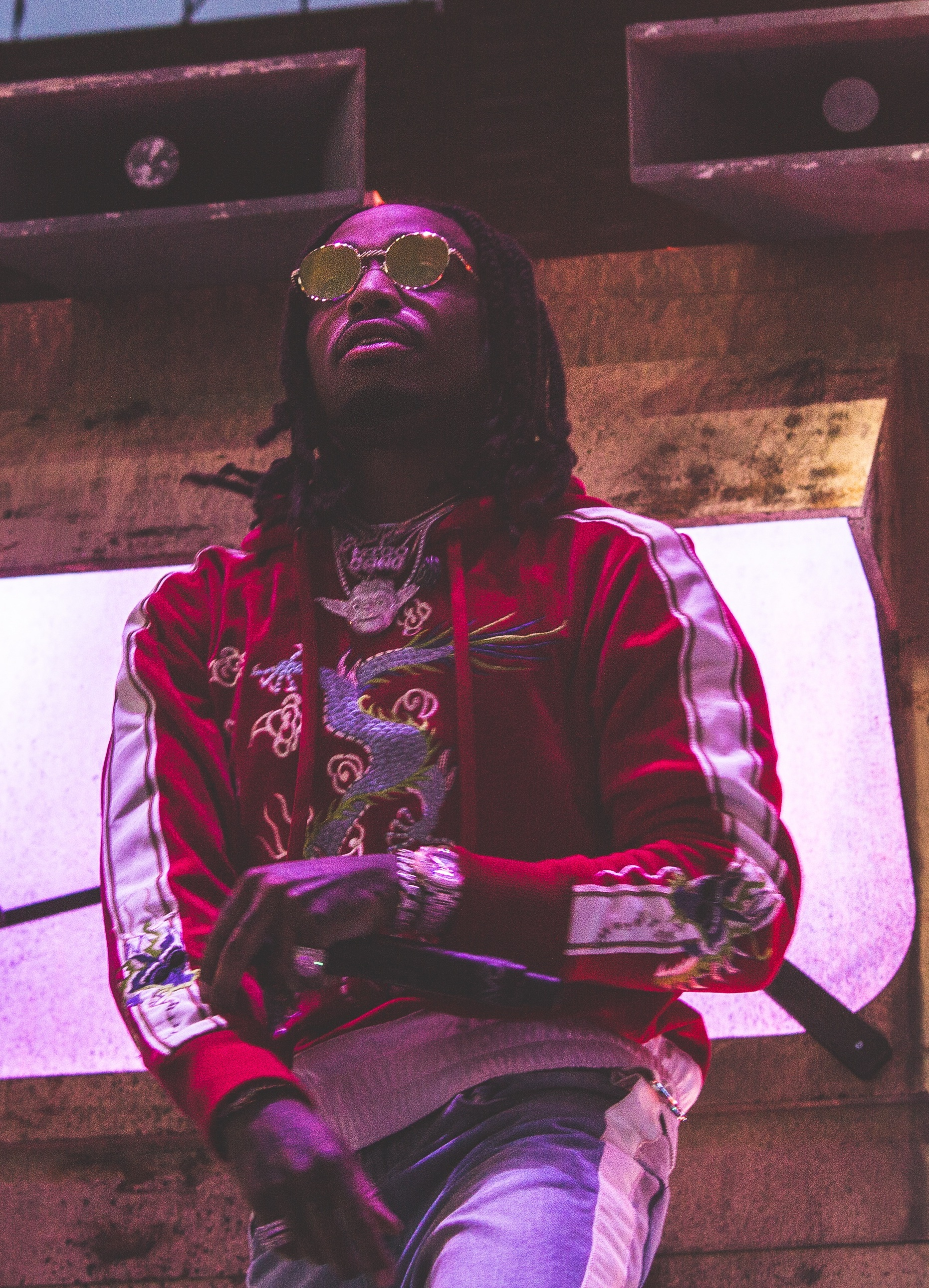
"Strip That Down" features a guest appearance from Quavo (pictured), from the Atlanta-based hip hop group, Migos.

After One Direction went on a hiatus, Payne, who co-wrote songs on each of the group's five albums, intended to focus only on songwriting. He told Billboard:

To be honest with you, I wasn't going to do a solo venture. I was just going to go into songwriting and carry on and do that. But then I was like, 'You've been trying to do this since you were 14 years old. You would be ridiculously stupid to turn down the option to have a deal.' Coming out of the band, we had some pretty good opportunities around us. I had to do something.

The singer met Ed Sheeran in London in the late summer of 2016, "We went in, sat around and discussed a bunch of things about life, and [the song] basically just came together," said Payne. After working with Sheeran and producer Steve Mac, Payne decided to add Migos member Quavo into the mix as the song's featured artist. While talking about how that collaboration came together in an interview with iHeartRadio, Payne said; "I was thinking, like rapper time, it was going to take two or three weeks. But, we got it, played it straight away, and we were like, 'We absolutely love it.' He's a great man to have on the team."

== Composition ==
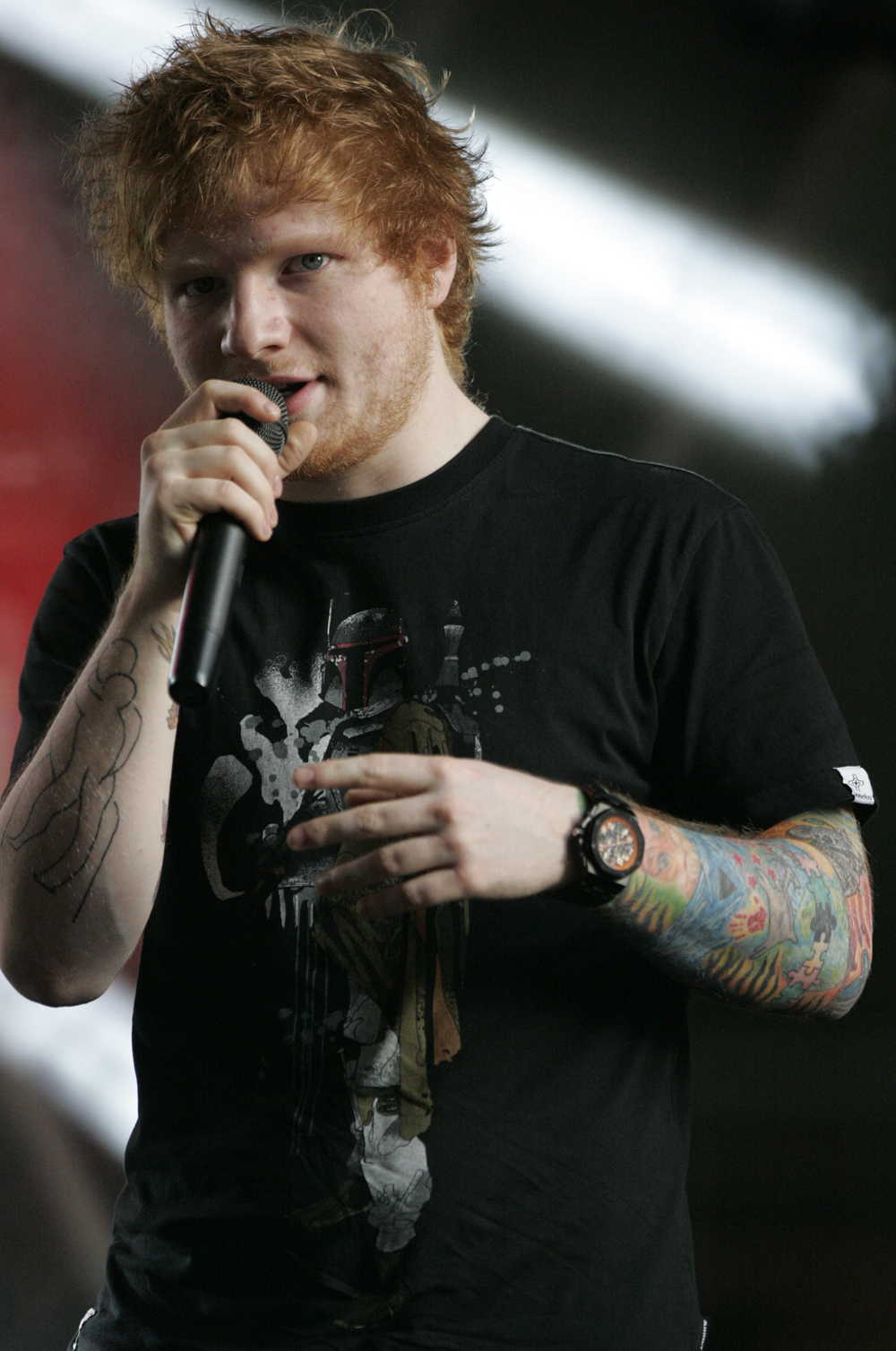
Ed Sheeran (pictured) co-wrote the song and provided uncredited vocals to it.

"Strip That Down" is a trap, snap and hip hop-influenced pop and R&B track. Payne croons over "pulsating" synth-bass, a finger-click beat and chants with minimalist production style. Lyrically, the song contains themes of wealth, celebrity appeal and newfound career independence. While talking about the song, Payne said; "It just sets a few things straight, but then also the chorus is more about stripping back the music. I like to hear it loud sometimes, but sometimes you got to strip it back." For the concept of the song, Payne stated that they contemplated what Justin Timberlake would release as his debut solo single in 2017.

The song interpolates "It Wasn't Me" by Shaggy, which itself interpolates War's "Smile Happy", hence both Shaggy and the members of War (despite the latters song never appearing on the track) are credited as songwriters for this song.

== Critical reception ==
"Strip That Down" received mixed reviews. Rolling Stone staff called it a "summer club banger". Writers from Billboard thought Payne "seems to be aiming for a DJ Mustard/Tyga vibe," and concluded that "the song's fun: The swaggering, Directioner-baiting pre-chorus especially, which is probably the JT-est thing any of the five members have done since going solo." Comparing it to One Direction's catalogue, Jordan Harris from Express and Star opined it "is a lot more danceable, incredibly fun to listen to" and added, "Another similarity, and one which Liam would do well to use as a benchmark going forward, is the vocal style of Justin Timberlake." In Digital Spy, Laurence Mozafari wrote "the song screams of trying to be grown up." Time magazine listed "Strip That Down" as one of the worst songs of 2017.

== Music video ==
On 18 May 2017, the lyric video for "Strip That Down" was uploaded to Payne's Vevo channel. The music video for the song was released on the same channel on 2 June 2017. The video was directed by Emil Nava. It starts with a female dancer performing, followed by a black-and-white scene with Payne. As the video transitions from black and white to colour, it shows Payne in a neon world of bright lights, dancing, and an appearance from featured artist Quavo.

Reviewing the "sleek, colorful" clip, Rolling Stone staff wrote: "Payne rocks gently in what appears to be the inside of tanning bed." In Digital Spy, Justin Harp opined Payne "sheds One Direction's wholesome image in the sexy music video," and added, "The promo clip does exactly what it says on the tin, as the former boybander demonstrates his newfound hip-hop vibe while slinking around with twerking back-up dancers." Mike Wass from Idolator wrote that the video is "as awkward as the song", saying: "The Migos rapper appears completely at ease in his surroundings, while Liam looks like he accidentally wandered on to the set."

== Chart performance ==
"Strip That Down" charted within the top 5 in the charts of Australia, Ireland, New Zealand, and the United Kingdom. The single reached number 10 on the US Billboard Hot 100 becoming Payne's first and only top ten as a solo artist and Quavo's fourth. Payne thus became the third member of One Direction to achieve a solo top 10 single on the Hot 100, following Zayn and Harry Styles. In addition, One Direction joined The Beatles, Fleetwood Mac, and New Edition to have at least 3 members with solo Hot 100 songs reach the top 10.

On Billboard's Dance/Mix Show Airplay chart, "Strip That Down" reached number one in its 4 November 2017 issue for both artists, marking a first for Payne as he became the first solo artist from an all-male vocal group to top this chart (as he has charted as a member of One Direction, whose "What Makes You Beautiful" peaked at number 13 in May 2012); he also eclipsed his fellow members, three of whom also had top tens on this chart (two from Zayn, one each from Horan and Tomlinson respectively; Styles' debut "Sign of the Times" peaked at 37 in June 2017). In the case of Quavo, it surpassed his featured collaboration (with Justin Bieber, Chance the Rapper and Lil Wayne) on DJ Khaled's "I'm the One", which peaked at number two in July 2017.

Following Payne's death in October 2024, the song saw a surge in sales and streams. The Official Charts Company showed "Strip That Down" place at number 75 on the UK Midweek Singles Chart. It re-entered the UK Singles Chart Top 100, on 25 October 2024, at number 41.

== Live performances ==
On 26 May 2017, Payne performed the song for the first time on The Graham Norton Show. The singer also performed "Strip That Down" at the Capital FM's Summertime Ball on 10 June, on The Tonight Show Starring Jimmy Fallon on 22 June and at the 2017 MTV Europe Music Awards on 12 November 2017.

== Track listing ==
- Digital download
1. "Strip That Down" – 3:24
- Digital download – Acoustic
1. "Strip That Down" (Acoustic) – 3:04
- Digital download – Nevada Remix
1. "Strip That Down" (Nevada Remix) – 3:44

== Charts ==
=== Weekly charts ===
Chart (2017)	Peak position
Australia (ARIA)	2
Austria (Ö3 Austria Top 40)	15
Belgium (Ultratop 50 Flanders)	39
Belgium (Ultratip Bubbling Under Wallonia)	4
Canada Hot 100 (Billboard)	11
Colombia (National-Report)	66
Czech Republic Airplay (ČNS IFPI)	14
Czech Republic Singles Digital (ČNS IFPI)	14
Denmark (Tracklisten)	15
Finland Digital Songs (Billboard)	7
France (SNEP)	82
Germany (GfK)	10
Greece Digital Songs (Billboard)	7
Hungary (Single Top 40)	18
Hungary (Stream Top 40)	16
Ireland (IRMA)	2
Italy (FIMI)	39
Malaysia (RIM)	6
Netherlands (Dutch Top 40)	28
Netherlands (Single Top 100)	21
New Zealand (Recorded Music NZ)	4
Norway (VG-lista)	28
Philippines (Philippine Hot 100)	22
Portugal (AFP)	14
Scottish Singles Sales (Official Charts)	3
Slovakia Airplay (ČNS IFPI)	30
Slovakia Singles Digital (ČNS IFPI)	16
South Korea International Chart (GAON)	93
Spain (Promusicae)	65
Sweden (Sverigetopplistan)	24
Switzerland (Schweizer Hitparade)	30
UK Singles (Official Charts)	3
US Billboard Hot 100	10
US Adult Pop Airplay (Billboard)	14
US Dance Club Songs (Billboard)	46
US Dance Airplay (Billboard)	1
US Pop Airplay (Billboard)	1
US Rhythmic Airplay (Billboard)	8

Chart (2024)	Peak position
UK Singles (Official Charts)	41

=== Year-end charts ===
Chart (2017)	Position
Australia (ARIA)	11
Austria (Ö3 Austria Top 40)	46
Brazil (Pro-Música Brasil)	193
Canada (Canadian Hot 100)	28
Denmark (Tracklisten)	62
Germany (Official German Charts)	30
Hungary (Stream Top 40)	45
Netherlands (Single Top 100)	69
New Zealand (Recorded Music NZ)	15
Portugal (AFP)	56
Sweden (Sverigetopplistan)	73
Switzerland (Schweizer Hitparade)	99
UK Singles (Official Charts Company)	20
US Billboard Hot 100	36
US Dance/Mix Show Airplay (Billboard)	13
US Mainstream Top 40 (Billboard)	12
US Rhythmic (Billboard)	39

== Certifications ==
Region	Certification	Certified units/sales
Australia (ARIA)	5× Platinum	350,000^{‡}
Belgium (BRMA)	Gold	10,000^{‡}
Brazil (Pro-Música Brasil)	3× Platinum	180,000^{‡}
Canada (Music Canada)	7× Platinum	560,000^{‡}
Denmark (IFPI Danmark)	Platinum	90,000^{‡}
France (SNEP)	Gold	66,666^{‡}
Germany (BVMI)	Platinum	400,000^{‡}
Italy (FIMI)	Platinum	50,000^{‡}
New Zealand (RMNZ)	4× Platinum	120,000^{‡}
Portugal (AFP)	Platinum	10,000^{‡}
Spain (Promusicae)	Gold	30,000^{‡}
Sweden (GLF)	Platinum	40,000^{‡}
United Kingdom (BPI)	2× Platinum	1,200,000^{‡}
United States (RIAA)	3× Platinum	3,000,000^{‡}
^{‡} Sales+streaming figures based on certification alone.

== Release history ==
Region	Date	Format	Version	Label	Ref.
Various	19 May 2017	Digital download	Original	Capitol	
United States	23 May 2017	Rhythmic contemporary	Original	Republic	
United States	23 May 2017	Contemporary hit radio	Original	Republic	
Italy	9 June 2017	Contemporary hit radio	Original	Universal	
Various	16 June 2017	Digital download	Acoustic	Capitol	
Various	30 June 2017	Digital download	Nevada Remix	Capitol	

== See also ==
- List of Billboard Hot 100 top-ten singles in 2017
- List of top 10 singles for 2017 in Australia
- List of UK top-ten singles in 2017
