= Polaroid (Jonas Blue, Liam Payne and Lennon Stella song) =

Single by Jonas Blue, Liam Payne and Lennon Stella

from the album Blue
- Released: 5 October 2018
- Genre: Dance-pop; R&B; pop
- Length: 3:13
- Label: Virgin EMI
- Songwriters: Ed Drewett; Sam Roman; Guy James Robin; John Paul Cooper
- Producer: Blue

Jonas Blue singles chronology
| "Roll with Me" (2018) | "Polaroid" (2018) | "Desperate" (2019) |

Liam Payne singles chronology
| "First Time" (2018) | "Polaroid" (2018) | "Stack It Up" (2019) |

Lennon Stella singles chronology
| "Bad" (2018) | "Polaroid" (2018) | "Breakaway" (2018) |

"Polaroid" is a song by English DJ and record producer Jonas Blue, English singer and songwriter Liam Payne and Canadian singer Lennon Stella. It was released as a digital download on 5 October 2018 via Virgin EMI Records as the eighth single from Blue's compilation album Blue. It is also included on Payne's debut studio album LP1. To date, it has sold two million units worldwide.

== Background and composition ==
On 4 October 2018, Jonas Blue released the cover art and a preview for "Polaroid". Written by Ed Drewett, Sam Roman, Blue and John Paul Cooper, the track has been described as R&B pop with an anthemic chorus and an irresistible groove. The song was also produced by Blue.

The song is about the concept of finding love at first sight. When Blue started writing the track, he felt that "only Liam could sing it." The song was originally going to feature Liam Payne and Cheryl, however due to the two splitting back in June, Blue chose Lennon Stella instead.

== Critical reception ==
BroadwayWorld called the track a "heaven sent slice of R&B pop replete with a truly anthemic chorus and an irresistible groove". Idolator felt the song had "shimmering production", an "irresistible chorus", and that Payne and Stella have "striking vocals" and chemistry.

== Music video ==
A music video to accompany the release of "Polaroid" was shot in New York City's Central Park on 21 August 2018. It was officially released onto YouTube on 19 October 2018 and was directed by Jay Martin. The video features a couple falling in love after taking a Polaroid picture together, and also features appearances by all three artists. Billboard commented that the video brings the "romantic dance song to life".

== Track listing ==
Digital download
| No. | Title | Length |
|---|---|---|
| 1. | "Polaroid" | 3:13 |

Digital download – acoustic
| No. | Title | Length |
|---|---|---|
| 1. | "Polaroid" (acoustic) | 3:37 |

== Charts ==
=== Weekly charts ===
| Chart (2018–19) | Peak position |
|---|---|
| Australia Dance (ARIA) | 23 |
| Australia Digital Tracks (ARIA) | 25 |
| Belgium (Ultratop 50 Flanders) | 29 |
| Belgium (Ultratop 50 Wallonia) | 47 |
| Canada (Hot Canadian Digital Songs) | 50 |
| Croatia (HRT) | 21 |
| Czech Republic Singles Digital (ČNS IFPI) | 87 |
| France (SNEP) | 183 |
| Greece International Digital Singles (IFPI) | 90 |
| Hungary (Rádiós Top 40) | 23 |
| Israel (Media Forest) | 1 |
| Ireland (IRMA) | 22 |
| Japan Hot 100 (Billboard) | 63 |
| Mexico Airplay (Billboard) | 25 |
| Netherlands (Dutch Top 40) | 20 |
| Netherlands (Single Top 100) | 92 |
| New Zealand Hot Singles (RMNZ) | 16 |
| Scotland Singles (OCC) | 3 |
| Slovakia Airplay (ČNS IFPI) | 12 |
| Slovenia (SloTop50) | 29 |
| Switzerland (Schweizer Hitparade) | 96 |
| UK Singles (OCC) | 12 |
| Ukraine Airplay (TopHit) | 71 |
| US Dance Club Songs (Billboard) | 1 |
| US Hot Dance/Electronic Songs (Billboard) | 16 |

=== Year-end charts ===
| Chart (2018) | Position |
|---|---|
| US Hot Dance/Electronic Songs (Billboard) | 97 |
| Chart (2019) | Position |
| Belgium (Ultratop Flanders) | 98 |
| Portugal (AFP) | 159 |
| US Dance Club Songs (Billboard) | 29 |
| US Hot Dance/Electronic Songs (Billboard) | 51 |

== Certifications ==
| Region | Certification | Certified units/sales |
|---|---|---|
| Australia (ARIA) | Platinum | 70,000^{‡} |
| Brazil (Pro-Música Brasil) | 3× Platinum | 120,000^{‡} |
| Canada (Music Canada) | Platinum | 80,000^{‡} |
| Denmark (IFPI Danmark) | Gold | 45,000^{‡} |
| Italy (FIMI) | Gold | 25,000^{‡} |
| New Zealand (RMNZ) | Gold | 15,000^{‡} |
| Poland (ZPAV) | Gold | 25,000^{‡} |
| Portugal (AFP) | Platinum | 10,000^{‡} |
| Spain (Promusicae) | Gold | 30,000^{‡} |
| United Kingdom (BPI) | Platinum | 600,000^{‡} |
| United States (RIAA) | Gold | 500,000^{‡} |
Streaming
| Sweden (GLF) | Gold | 4,000,000^{†} |
^{‡} Sales+streaming figures based on certification alone.^{†} Streaming-only figures based on certification alone.

== Release history ==
| Region | Date | Format | Version | Label | Ref. |
|---|---|---|---|---|---|
| United Kingdom | 5 October 2018 | Digital download | Original | Virgin EMI | |
| Various | 23 November 2018 | Digital download | Acoustic | Virgin EMI | |

== See also ==
- List of Billboard number-one dance songs of 2019
