= First Time (Liam Payne and French Montana song) =

Single by Liam Payne and French Montana

from the EP First Time
- Released: 17 August 2018
- Genre: R&B
- Length: 3:12
- Label: Capitol
- Songwriter(s): Karim Kharbouch; Stephen McGregor; John Mitchell; BURNS
- Producer(s): Di Genius; Burns

Liam Payne singles chronology
"Familiar" (2018)	"First Time" (2018)	"Polaroid" (2018)

Music video
- "First Time" on YouTube

"First Time" is a song by English singer Liam Payne and Moroccan-American rapper French Montana. The song was released on 17 August 2018 as the lead single from his debut extended play, First Time.

== Background and composition ==
Payne released "First Time" on 17 August 2018 and announced the track listing for his EP First Time. The track was written by Karim Kharbouch, Stephen McGregor, John Mitchell and BURNS. Musically, the song has been described as a "Latin-infused track" and R&B.

== Music video ==
The music video for "First Time" was directed by Phillip R. Lopez and was released on 20 September 2018. The music video was filmed in New York City and shows Payne walking through the neon lit city and down rain-dampened streets and driving with Montana. Payne spoke about the concept with Billboard stating, "We are basically shooting me through New York, and I've got this girl. She's put a spell on me. It's been known to happen many times. So I'm going to recreate that moment.

== Chart performance ==
"First Time" saw little commercial success, failing to chart on the UK Singles Chart and the UK Singles Top 40. However, the song peaked at number 68 on the UK Singles Downloads Chart. The song also reached number 82 on the Scottish Singles Chart.

== Personnel ==
Musicians

- Liam Payne – vocals
- French Montana – featured artist

Production

- Matthew Burns – producer
- Di Genius – producer
- Jaycen Joshua – mixing engineering
- Jacob Richards – assistant mixing engineer
- David Nakaji – assistant mixing engineer
- Rashawn McLean – assistant mixing engineer
- Daniel Z – vocal engineer
- Mixx – vocal engineer
- OAK – engineering
- Randy Merrill – mastering engineer

== Charts ==
Chart performance for "First Time"
Chart (2018)	Peak position
Netherlands (Dutch Top 40 Tiparade)	10
New Zealand Hot Singles (RMNZ)	27
Scotland (OCC)	82
UK Singles Downloads (OCC)	68

== Release history ==
Release history for "First Time"
Region	Date	Format	Label	Ref.
Various	17 August 2018	Digital download	Capitol	
