= Jonas Blue discography =

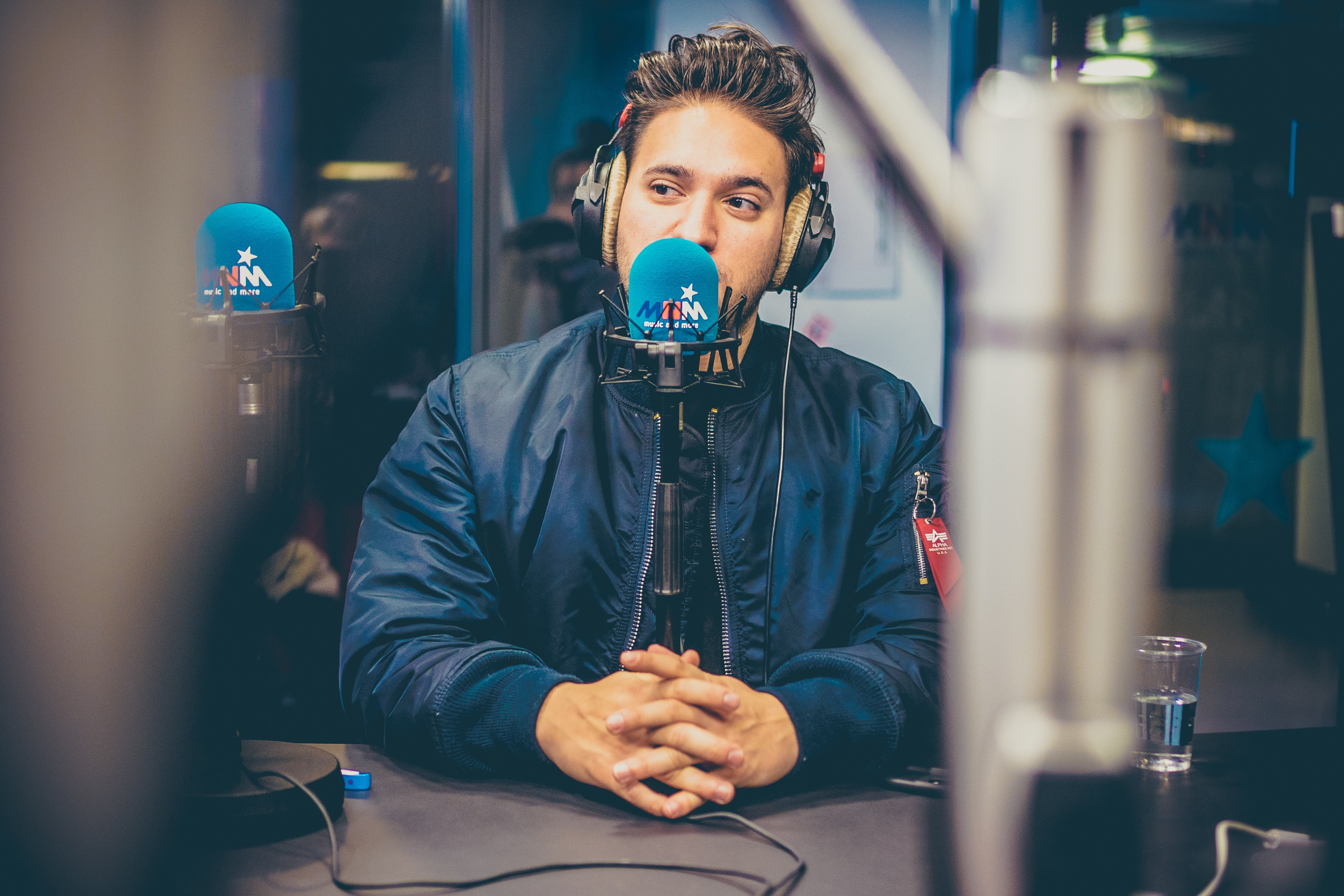
- Jonas Blue in studio MNM, 2018
- Studio albums: 1
- Compilation albums: 2
- Singles: 41
- Music videos: 22

This is the discography of Jonas Blue, an English DJ, record producer and remixer. His debut studio album, Blue, was released in November 2018 and peaked at number thirty-three on the UK Albums Chart.

== Albums ==
=== Studio albums ===
Title	Details	Peak chart positions					Certifications
Title	Details	UK	AUS	CAN	NL	NZ	Certifications
Blue	Released: 9 November 2018; Label: Positiva, Virgin EMI; Format: CD, digital download, streaming	33	50	78	78	33	BPI: Gold; ARIA: Platinum; RMNZ: 2× Platinum

=== Compilation albums ===
Title	Details	Peak chart positions		
Title	Details	FIN	JPN Hot	US
Jonas Blue: Electronic Nature – The Mix 2017	Released: 14 July 2017; Label: Universal Music Group; Format: Digital download	41	—	151
Est. 1989	Released: 11 December 2020; Label: Universal Music Japan; Format: Digital download, CD	—	—	—
Together	Released: 29 March 2024; Label: Universal Music Japan; Format: Digital download, CD	—	98	—
"—" denotes releases that did not chart or were not released in that territory.

== Singles ==
Title	Year	Peak chart positions										Certifications	Album
Title	Year	UK	AUS	AUT	DEN	GER	NL	NOR	NZ	SWE	US	Certifications	Album
"Fast Car" (featuring Dakota) (Note: The Club Mix Remix of "Fast Car" features on the album Jonas Blue: Electronic Nature – The Mix 2017.)	2015	2	1	3	6	2	3	9	2	2	98	BPI: 3× Platinum; ARIA: 9× Platinum; BVMI: 3× Gold; GLF: 6× Platinum; IFPI AUT: Platinum; IFPI DEN: 3× Platinum; NVPI: 5× Platinum; RIAA: Platinum; RMNZ: 5× Platinum	Blue (Note: "Fast Car" and "We Could Go Back" only appear on the digital edition on Blue.) and The Electronic Nature – The Mix 2017
"Perfect Strangers" (featuring JP Cooper) (Note: "Perfect Strangers" also features on the album Jonas Blue: Electronic Nature – The Mix 2017.)	2016	2	6	9	11	9	2	7	8	3	— (Note: "Perfect Strangers" did not enter the Billboard Hot 100, but peaked at number 11 on the Bubbling Under Hot 100 Singles chart, which acts as an extension to the Hot 100.)	BPI: 3× Platinum; ARIA: 5× Platinum; BVMI: Platinum; GLF: 3× Platinum; IFPI DEN: 2× Platinum; NVPI: 4× Platinum; RIAA: Gold; RMNZ: 3× Platinum	Blue and The Electronic Nature – The Mix 2017
"By Your Side" (featuring Raye) (Note: The PBH & Jack Shizzle Remix of "By Your Side" features on the album Jonas Blue: Electronic Nature – The Mix 2017.)	2016	15	33	56	—	45	28	—	— (Note: "By Your Side" did not enter the NZ Top 40 Singles Chart, but peaked at number two on the NZ Heatseeker Singles Chart.)	94	—	BPI: Platinum; ARIA: 2× Platinum; BVMI: Gold; IFPI DEN: Gold; RIAA: Gold; RMNZ: Platinum	Blue and The Electronic Nature – The Mix 2017
"Mama" (featuring William Singe) (Note: "Mama" also features on the album Jonas Blue: Electronic Nature – The Mix 2017.)	2017	4	7	5	5	5	1	9	8	6	— (Note: "Mama" did not enter the Billboard Hot 100, but peaked at number one on the Bubbling Under Hot 100 Singles chart, which acts as an extension to the Hot 100.)	BPI: 2× Platinum; ARIA: 6× Platinum; BVMI: 2× Platinum; GLF: 2× Platinum; IFPI AUT: Gold; IFPI DEN: 3× Platinum; NVPI: 2× Platinum; RIAA: Gold; RMNZ: 3× Platinum	Blue and The Electronic Nature – The Mix 2017
"We Could Go Back" (featuring Moelogo)	2017	74	—	—	—	—	51	—	— (Note: "We Could Go Back" did not enter the NZ Top 40 Singles Chart, but peaked at number seven on the NZ Heatseeker Singles Chart.)	— (Note: "We Could Go Back" did not enter the Swedish Singellista chart, but peaked at number eight on the Swedish Heatseeker chart.)	—		Blue
"Hearts Ain't Gonna Lie" (with Arlissa)	2018	—	—	—	—	—	49	—	—	— (Note: "Hearts Ain't Gonna Lie" did not enter the Swedish Singellista chart, but peaked at number 16 on the Swedish Heatseeker chart.)	—	BPI: Gold	Est. 1989
"Alien" (with Sabrina Carpenter) (Note: "Alien" appears as an album track only on the Japanese editions of Blue and Sabrina Carpenter's Singular: Act I.)	2018	—	—	—	—	—	—	—	—	—	—		Blue
"Rise" (featuring Jack & Jack)	2018	3	7	2	20	8	3	10	13	14	— (Note: "Rise" did not enter the Billboard Hot 100, but peaked at number nine on the Bubbling Under Hot 100 Singles chart, which acts as an extension to the Hot 100.)	BPI: 2× Platinum; ARIA: 6× Platinum; BVMI: Platinum; GLF: 2× Platinum; IFPI DEN: Platinum; NVPI: Platinum; RIAA: Gold; RMNZ: 3× Platinum	Blue
"I See Love" (featuring Joe Jonas) (Note: "I See Love" features in the films Hotel Transylvania 3 and The Queen's Corgi.)	2018	—	—	—	—	—	—	—	—	— (Note: "I See Love" did not enter the Swedish Singellista Chart, but peaked at number 20 on the Swedish Heatseeker Chart.)	—		Blue
"Back & Forth" (with MK and Becky Hill)	2018	12	—	—	—	—	—	—	—	—	—	BPI: Platinum; RMNZ: Gold	Get to Know and Est. 1989
"Roll with Me" (with Bantu featuring Shungudzo and ZieZie)	2018	—	—	—	—	—	—	—	—	—	—		Non-album single
"Polaroid" (Note: "Polaroid" also appears on Payne's album LP1.) (with Liam Payne and Lennon Stella)	2018	12	23	—	—	—	20	—	— (Note: "Polaroid" did not enter the NZ Top 40 Singles Chart, but peaked at number 16 on the NZ Hot Singles Chart.)	—	—	BPI: Platinum; ARIA: Platinum; GLF: Gold; IFPI DEN: Gold; RIAA: Gold; RMNZ: Gold	Blue
"Desperate" (featuring Nina Nesbitt)	2019	—	—	—	—	—	—	—	—	—	—		Blue
"Wild" (featuring Chelcee Grimes, Tini and Jhay Cortez)	2019	—	—	—	—	—	—	—	—	—	—		Blue
"What I Like About You" (featuring Theresa Rex)	2019	16	—	—	—	93	89	—	— (Note: "What I Like About You" did not enter the NZ Top 40 Singles Chart, but peaked at number 22 on the NZ Hot Singles Chart.)	— (Note: "What I Like About You" did not enter the Swedish Singellista Chart, but peaked at number one on the Swedish Heatseeker Chart.)	—	BPI: Platinum; ARIA: Platinum; IFPI DEN: Gold; RMNZ: Gold	Blue (deluxe edition) and Est. 1989
"Ritual" (Note: "Ritual" is also included on Tiësto's sixth studio album, The London Sessions.) (with Tiësto and Rita Ora)	2019	24	—	—	—	—	11	—	—	24	—	BPI: Platinum; GLF: Platinum; IFPI DEN: Gold; IFPI NOR: Platinum; RMNZ: Gold	Blue (deluxe edition) and Est. 1989
"I Wanna Dance"	2019	—	—	—	—	—	—	—	—	—	—		Blue (deluxe edition) and Est. 1989
"Younger" (Note: "Younger" is also included on the deluxe edition of Hrvy's debut studio album, Can Anybody Hear Me?.) (with Hrvy)	2019	—	—	—	—	—	—	—	— (Note: "Younger" did not enter the NZ Top 40 Singles Chart, but peaked at number 38 on the NZ Hot Singles Chart.)	—	—		Blue (deluxe edition) and Est. 1989
"All Night Long" (with RetroVision)	2019	—	—	—	—	—	—	—	—	—	—		Est. 1989
"Billboard" (with Tifa Chen)	2019	—	—	—	—	—	—	—	—	—	—		Est. 1989
"Mistakes" (with Paloma Faith) (Note: "Mistakes" also appears on Together.)	2020	—	—	—	—	—	—	—	— (Note: "Mistakes" did not enter the NZ Top 40 Singles Chart, but peaked at number 35 on the NZ Hot Singles Chart.)	—	—		Est. 1989
"Naked" (with Max) (Note: "Naked" also appears on Together.)	2020	—	—	—	—	—	—	—	—	—	—		Est. 1989
"Something Stupid" (with AWA)	2021	—	—	—	—	—	—	—	— (Note: "Something Stupid" did not enter the NZ Top 40 Singles Chart, but peaked at number 30 on the NZ Hot Singles Chart.)	—	—		Together
"Hear Me Say" (with Léon)	2021	65	—	—	—	—	—	—	— (Note: "Hear Me Say" did not enter the NZ Top 40 Singles Chart, but peaked at number 35 on the NZ Hot Singles Chart.)	— (Note: "Hear Me Say" did not enter the Swedish Singellista Chart, but peaked at number three on the Swedish Heatseeker Chart.)	—		Together
"Sad Boy" (with R3hab featuring Ava Max and Kylie Cantrall)	2021	—	—	—	—	—	—	—	—	— (Note: "Sad Boy" did not enter the Swedish Singellista Chart, but peaked at number three on the Swedish Heatseeker Chart.)	—		Non-album single
"Don't Wake Me Up" (with Why Don't We) (Note: The BE:FIRST version appears on Together.)	2022	79	—	—	—	—	—	—	— (Note: "Don't Wake Me Up" did not enter the NZ Top 40 Singles Chart, but peaked at number 15 on the NZ Hot Singles Chart.)	—	—		Together
"Angles" (with Sevenn)	2022	—	—	—	—	—	—	—	—	—	—		Non-album singles
"Siento"	2022	—	—	—	—	—	—	—	—	—	—		Non-album singles
"Til the End" (with Sam Feldt and Sam Derosa)	2022	—	—	—	—	—	—	—	—	—	—		Non-album singles
"Perfect Melody" (with Julian Perretta)	2022	—	—	—	—	—	—	—	—	—	—		Together
"Always Be There" (with Louisa Johnson)	2022	—	—	—	—	—	—	—	—	—	—		Together
"Weekends" (with Felix Jaehn)	2023	—	—	—	—	51	—	—	—	—	—	BVMI: Gold	Together
"Crying on the Dancefloor" (with Sam Feldt and Violet Days)	2023	—	—	—	—	—	—	—	—	—	—	NVPI: Gold	Time After Time
"Finally" (with Rani)	2023	—	—	—	—	—	—	—	—	—	—		Together
"All You Need Is Love" (with Nicky Romero and Nico Santos)	2023	—	—	—	—	—	—	—	—	—	—		Non-album single
"Past Life" (with Felix Jaehn)	2023	—	—	—	—	—	—	—	—	—	—		Together
"Rest of My Life" (with Sam Feldt and Sadie Van Rose)	2024	—	—	—	—	—	—	—	—	—	—		Together
"Mountains" (with Galantis and Zoe Wees)	2024	—	—	—	—	—	—	—	—	—	—		Non-album singles
"100 Lives" (with Eyelar)	2024	—	—	—	—	—	—	—	—	—	—		Non-album singles
"Lifeline" (with Izzy Bizu)	2025	—	—	—	—	—	—	—	—	—	—		Non-album singles
"Edge of Desire" (with Malive)	2025	71	—	—	—	—	11	—	—	—	—	BPI: Silver	Non-album singles
"Girl"	2026	—	—	—	—	—	—	—	—	—	—		Non-album singles
"Madan" (with Salif Keita)	2026	—	—	—	—	—	—	—	—	—	—		Non-album singles
"Problems"	2026	To be released											Non-album singles
"—" denotes a recording that did not chart or was not released.

== Guest appearances ==
List of non-single guest appearances, with other performing artists, showing year released and album name
Title	Year	Other artist(s)	Album
"Now or Never"	2019	Got7	Call My Name

== Production and songwriting credits ==
Title	Year	Artist(s)	Album	Credit(s)
"Heartline"	2017	Craig David	The Time is Now	Producer
"Blind"	2018	Four of Diamonds	Non-album single	Co-producer
"My Head & My Heart"	2020	Ava Max	Heaven & Hell	Co-producer

== Remixes ==
Title	Year	Original artist(s)	Albums	Ref.
"Keeping Your Head Up"	2016	Birdy	Jonas Blue: Electronic Nature – The Mix 2017	
"Still Falling for You"	2016	Ellie Goulding	Jonas Blue: Electronic Nature – The Mix 2017	
"Stay"	2017	Zedd and Alessia Cara	Stay – Remixes EP and Jonas Blue: Electronic Nature – The Mix 2017	
"Old Friends"	2017	Jasmine Thompson	Wonderland – EP	
"Strangers"	2018	Sigrid	Non-album remix	
"Wild Love"	2018	James Bay	Wild Love (Remixes)	
"Bum Bum Tam Tam"	2018	MC Fioti, Future, J Balvin and Stefflon Don	Non-album remixes	
"Polaroid"	2018	Jonas Blue, Liam Payne and Lennon Stella	Non-album remixes	
"No One"	2019	Jess Glynne	Non-album remixes	
"I Don't Care"	2019	Ed Sheeran and Justin Bieber	Non-album remixes	
"Don't Give Up On Me Now"	2019	R3hab and Julie Bergan	Non-album remixes	
"Ride It"	2019	Regard	Non-album remixes	
"Joys"	2019	Roberto Surace	Non-album remixes	
"My Life Is Music"	2020	Felix Da Housecat and The Visionary	Non-album remixes	
"Baby"	2020	Madison Beer	Non-album remixes	
"Fly Away"	2021	Tones and I	Non-album remixes	
"Run Into Trouble"	2022	Alok and Bastille	Non-album remixes	
"Moonlight Sunrise"	2023	Twice	Non-album remixes	
"Yes, And?"	2024	Ariana Grande	Yes, And? (Remixes)	
"Aceita"	2024	Anitta	Non-album remix	
