= Jonas Blue: Electronic Nature – The Mix 2017 =

Compilation album by Jonas Blue
- Released: 14 July 2017
- Genre: Dance
- Label: Universal Music Group
- Producer: Various

Jonas Blue chronology
Jonas Blue: Electronic Nature – The Mix 2017 (2017)	Blue (2018)

Jonas Blue: Electronic Nature – The Mix 2017 is a compilation album by English DJ, record producer and songwriter Jonas Blue. The album was released on 14 July 2017 by Universal Music Group. The album peaked at number 7 on the UK Compilation Chart and number 41 on the Finnish Albums Chart.

== Background ==
The album is a selection of songs from Jonas' DJ sets, combined with his singles "Fast Car", "Perfect Strangers", "By Your Side" and "Mama", and two collaborations (with Mark Villa and EDX). Talking about the album, Jonas said, "I'm so proud to launch my new project Electronic Nature with this special album [...] The concept and vision of Electronic Nature is to give my fans a fully immersive sensory experience of music, visuals and more." The album includes original and official remixes from Galantis, Disciples, Oliver Heldens, Disclosure, Gryffin, Don Diablo and Martin Solveig.

== Track listing ==
No.	Title	Length
1.	"Jonas Blue: Electronic Nature – The Mix 2017" (Continuous Mix 1)	67:23
2.	"Jonas Blue: Electronic Nature – The Mix 2017" (Continuous Mix 2)	66:24
3.	"Jonas Blue: Electronic Nature – The Mix 2017" (Continuous Mix 3)	71:43

Disc one

No.	Title	Writer(s)	Producer(s)	Length
1.	"Mama" (featuring William Singe)	Guy James Robin; Ed Drewett; Sam Romans	Jonas Blue	3:02
2.	"You Don't Know Me" (Radio Edit) (Jax Jones featuring Raye)			3:33
3.	"Solo Dance" (Martin Jensen)			2:56
4.	"Stay" (Zedd & Alessia Cara) (Jonas Blue Remix)			4:26
5.	"Boss" (Disclosure) (Radio Edit)			4:44
6.	"I Love You" (CID Remix) (Axwell Λ Ingrosso featuring Kid Ink)			2:35
7.	"Daylight" (Disciples)			2:48
8.	"Let Me Love You" (DJ Snake featuring Justin Bieber)			3:25
9.	"No Money" (Galantis)			3:07
10.	"Still Falling for You" (Ellie Goulding) (Jonas Blue Remix)			3:06
11.	"This Girl" (Kungs vs. Cookin' on 3 Burners)			3:16
12.	"Ocean Drive" (Duke Dumont)			3:26
13.	"Sexual" (Oliver Nelson Remix/Radio Edit) (NEIKED featuring Dyo)			3:21
14.	"Places" (Martin Solveig featuring Ina Wroldsen)			3:22
15.	"Trouble" (Offaiah)			2:54
16.	"Shades of Grey" (Nora En Pure Remix) (Oliver Heldens & Shaun Frank featuring Delaney Jane)			4:46
17.	"Show Me Love" (EDX Remix/Radio Edit) (Sam Feldt featuring Kimberly Anne)			2:58
18.	"On My Way" (EDX's Miami Sunset Remix) (Tiësto featuring Bright Sparks)			3:24
19.	"House Every Weekend" (David Zowie) (Radio Edit)			3:03
20.	"Perfect Strangers" (Jonas Blue featuring JP Cooper)	Robin; John Paul Cooper; Alex Smith	Jonas Blue	3:15

Disc two

No.	Title	Writer(s)	Artist(s)	Length
1.	"In Your Arms Tonight" (Jonas Blue and Mark Villa)	Robin; Martinus Haasse; Nicholas Gale	Jonas Blue; Mark Villa	2:42
2.	"Make Me Feel Better" (Alex Adair) (Don Diablo & CID Remix/Radio Edit)			3:23
3.	"Don't You Feel It" (Sub Focus featuring Alma)			3:28
4.	"I Hear You Calling" (DJ Licious)			3:26
5.	"Talking Body" (Tove Lo) (KREAM Remix)			3:34
6.	"Are You With Me" (Lost Frequencies) (Radio Edit)			2:18
7.	"Be Right There" (Diplo and Sleepy Tom)			3:35
8.	"Intoxicated" (Martin Solveig and GTA) (Radio Edit)			2:40
9.	"Flamingo" (Oliver Heldens)			3:06
10.	"Shed a Light" (Robin Schulz, David Guetta and Cheat Codes)			3:11
11.	"Bullit" (Watermat) (Radio Edit)			3:15
12.	"Can't Fight It" (Quintino and Cheat Codes)			3:05
13.	"Alright" (Steff da Campo)			2:56
14.	"Desire" (Years & Years) (Gryffin Remix)			4:29
15.	"Good Grief" (Bastille) (Don Diablo Remix)			3:56
16.	"My Feelings for You" (Avicii and Sebastien Drums)			2:30
17.	"Fire" (Beth Ditto) (Disciples Remix)			5:16
18.	"Keeping Your Head Up" (Birdy) (Jonas Blue Remix)			3:03
19.	"You're Sunshine" (Weiss) (Radio Edit)			2:57
20.	"By Your Side" (Jonas Blue featuring RAYE) (PBH & Jack Shizzle Remix)	Robin; George Astasio; Jason Pebworth; Jonathan Shave; Grace Barker	Jonas Blue; PBH; Jack Shizzle	3:26

Disc three

No.	Title	Writer(s)	Artist(s)	Length
1.	"Don't Call It Love" (Jonas Blue & EDX featuring Alex Mills)	Robin; Maurizio Colella; Cristian Hirt; Mans Wrendenberg; Alex Mills	Jonas Blue; EDX	3:18
2.	"You're Makin' Me High" (Radio Edit) (KIKKR featuring Ideh)			2:58
3.	"Grey" (Kölsch)			4:53
4.	"Cutting Shapes" (Don Diablo)			2:59
5.	"Make Your Move" (Croatia Squad and Lika Morgan) (eSquire Remix)			3:09
6.	"Paths" (Redondo and CamelPhat)			3:41
7.	"Abandon" (Daniel Portman)			5:21
8.	"Light It Up" (Extended Mix) (Calvo featuring Noubya)			2:55
9.	"Nobody" (Dropgun)			2:58
10.	"The Answer" (HI-LO) (Oliver Heldens Edit)			3:48
11.	"Calling On You" (Lucas & Steve featuring Jake Reese)			2:54
12.	"Sweet Memories" (CID & Kaskade) (Extended Mix)			4:21
13.	"Everyday My Life" (LVNDSCAPE)			3:17
14.	"Got the Love" (Don Diablo & Khrebto) (Radio Edit)			3:17
15.	"Run" (Offaiah)			3:10
16.	"Runaways" (M-22 Remix Edit) (Sam Feldt & Deepend featuring Teemu)			3:13
17.	"Could You Love Me?" (Black Saint)			3:26
18.	"Tunnel Vision" (Zonderling) (Don Diablo Edit)			3:35
19.	"Secrets" (CID featuring Conrad Sewell)			3:03
20.	"Fast Car" (Club Mix) (Jonas Blue featuring Dakota)	Tracy Chapman	Jonas Blue	5:31

== Charts ==
Chart (2017)	Peak position
Canadian Albums (Billboard)	74
Finnish Albums (Suomen virallinen lista)	41
UK Compilations Chart (OCC)	7
US Billboard 200	151
US Top Dance/Electronic Albums (Billboard)	4

== Release history ==
Country	Date	Label	Format
United Kingdom	14 July 2017	Universal Music Group	Digital download; CD
