= Younger (Jonas Blue and Hrvy song) =

Single by Jonas Blue and Hrvy

from the album Blue (Deluxe edition)
- Released: 6 September 2019
- Recorded: August 2019
- Genre: Electropop
- Length: 3:14
- Label: Positiva; Virgin EMI
- Songwriters: Guy James Robin; Sam Roman
- Producers: Jonas Blue; Cameron Gower Poole (voc.)

Jonas Blue singles chronology
| "I Wanna Dance" (2019) | "Younger" (2019) | "All Night Long" (2019) |

Hrvy singles chronology
| "Don't Need Your Love" (2019) | "Younger" (2019) | "Million Ways" (2019) |

Music video
- "Younger" on YouTube

"Younger" is a song recorded by English DJ and record producer Jonas Blue and English singer Hrvy. It was released on 6 September 2019 through Positiva Records and Virgin EMI. Jonas Blue also released a club mix on 27 September 2019, R&B and acoustic versions on 4 October 2019, and a remixes pack on 11 October 2019, featuring remixes from duo Punctual, Dutch DJ and producer Steff da Campo and the owner of Ride Recordings label, Myon.

== Background ==
Jonas Blue and Hrvy come from a long friendship. The duo, who has previously worked on the successes of Jonas Blue, like "Mama", "Rise" and "Polaroid", has composed "Younger" together with Sam Roman, one of the UK's most important composers, author of British success in 2019 for Lewis Capaldi, "Someone You Loved". But their relationship blossomed during Capital FM's Summertime Ball 2019 at Wembley Stadium, on 7 June, when Jonas Blue presented Hrvy on stage as a surprise and excited his fans. The singer has indeed interpreted the DJ's flagship songs, like "Mama" or "Rise". It was during an interview for EDM Identity after Lollapalooza festival in August 2019, that Jonas Blue revealed his future collaboration with the young singer. Responding to the journalist who wanted to know if he was planning future collaborations, he said, "There's a guy named Hrvy from the UK that I'd like to get something going with soon. Great voice, very R&B with a British twangy voice." He also alluded to this song during an interview for EDMTunes on 16 August 2019 by revealing that "another classic Jonas Blue is coming out early September".

Hrvy unveiled the genesis of the song in an interview for DNA India Magazine on 16 September. He said, "[Jonas Blue] was in the studio a couple of months ago, writing "Younger". He had me in mind and then he texted me if I wanted to do it. I wasn't going to say no, so I jumped at it. I went to record it, and we did a video in Los Angeles, USA."

Blue confessed to Hits Radio in November 2019 that since he saw the singer performing his songs, he wanted to collaborate with him. "And when I wrote 'Younger' it felt like the right song", he added, concluding this topic in the interview.

== Critical reception ==
BroadwayWorld TV News Desk described "Younger" as an electropop summer hit which shows the intense feeling of being young and free during the summer time, when the weight of all responsibility is less important. The duo wanted to evoke the theme of passing time and recklessness and this is confirmed by Hrvy's vocals: "Let’s stay younger together". According to Mike Nied from Idolator, they wanted to celebrate the rush of young love. He noticed that they have "a serious late-summer smash on their hands". In the same way, Jon Stickler from Stereoboard described the song as "a late summer tropically-tinged anthem" made to "celebrate the rush of young love". Antony Harari from Radio FG noted the song as a return to Jonas Blue's roots in reference to his tropical house summer classics. Effectively, the single comes after his surprising summer track "I Wanna Dance" which was more oriented towards EDM.

== Music video ==
A lyric video was posted at the same day of the release. The music video was released on 22 September through Jonas Blue's YouTube channel. The music video was directed by Daniel Carberry (who has also worked for artists such as Justin Bieber, Usher and Bruno Mars), it shows the two artists of the track in a swimming pool in Malibu, California, in the company of American Instagram model Sommer Ray.

== Track listing ==
Digital download
| No. | Title | Length |
|---|---|---|
| 1. | "Younger" | 3:14 |

Digital download – Club Mix
| No. | Title | Length |
|---|---|---|
| 1. | "Younger" (Club Mix) | 4:18 |

Digital download – R&B / Acoustic Mixes
| No. | Title | Length |
|---|---|---|
| 1. | "Younger" (R&B Mix) | 3:08 |
| 2. | "Younger" (Acoustic Mix) | 3:08 |

Digital download – Remixes
| No. | Title | Length |
|---|---|---|
| 1. | "Younger" (Punctual Remix) | 4:00 |
| 2. | "Younger" (Steff da Campo Remix) | 2:51 |
| 3. | "Younger" (Myon Remix) | 4:11 |

== Credits and personnel ==
Credits adapted from Tidal.

- Jonas Blue – production, composition, lyrics, keyboards, mixing, programming, recording arranger
- Sam Roman – composition, lyrics, backing vocals
- Hrvy – vocals
- Mike Marsh – master engineering
- Cameron Gower Poole – vocal production

== Charts ==
| Chart (2019) | Peak position |
|---|---|
| Belgium (Ultratip Bubbling Under Wallonia) | 25 |
| CIS Airplay (TopHit) | 66 |
| Croatia Airplay (HRT) | 65 |
| Mexico Ingles Airplay (Billboard) | 45 |
| New Zealand Hot Singles (RMNZ) | 38 |
| Russia Airplay (TopHit) | 58 |
| Scotland Singles (OCC) | 61 |
| UK Singles Downloads (OCC) | 64 |
| UK Dance (OCC) | 28 |
| US Lyric Find Global (Billboard) | 3 |

== Certifications ==
| Region | Certification | Certified units/sales |
|---|---|---|
| Brazil (Pro-Música Brasil) | Gold | 20,000^{‡} |
^{‡} Sales+streaming figures based on certification alone.
