= Blue (Jonas Blue album) =

Studio album by Jonas Blue
- Released: 11 November 2018
- Genre: Dance
- Length: 48:03
- Label: Positiva; Virgin EMI
- Producer: Jonas Blue; Jordan Riley; Jackson Foote; Juan Magán; Banx & Ranx; Dark Heart; Kaskade; Finn Bjarnson; Richard Beynon

Jonas Blue chronology
Jonas Blue: Electronic Nature – The Mix 2017 (2017)	Blue (2018)	Est. 1989 (2020)

Singles from Blue
- 1. "We Could Go Back" Released: 13 October 2017; 2. "Rise" Released: 25 May 2018; 3. "I See Love" Released: 29 June 2018; 4. "Polaroid" Released: 5 October 2018; 5. "Desperate" Released: 23 January 2019; 6. "Wild" Released: 27 February 2019

Singles from Blue (Deluxe Edition)
- 1. "What I Like About You" Released: 22 March 2019; 2. "I Wanna Dance" Released: 19 July 2019; 3. "Younger" Released: 6 September 2019

Blue is the debut studio album by British DJ Jonas Blue, released on 11 November 2018, via Positiva and Virgin EMI.

== Background ==
The album consists of most of Blue's previous released singles including "Rise" with American duo Jack & Jack, "Polaroid" with English musician Liam Payne and double platinum-certified single "Fast Car" alongside seven new original tracks such as "Wherever You Go" and "Come Through". It features collaborators such as Canadian-Colombian singer-songwriter Jessie Reyez, American pop singer Joe Jonas, Scottish vocalist Nina Nesbitt, English songwriter Chelcee Grimes, Argentine singer Tini and Kosovar singer Era Istrefi.

Idolator described the album as a "greatest hits collection". Blue stated on his Instagram page that "Hey guys, super excited to announce the release of my debut album BLUE – coming out November 9th. Includes all the hits plus 7 new tracks with some amazing new artists." He told the Evening Standard that he "wanted to explore new talent and there's established acts and other people but it's been great to have the new up-and-coming talent on this".

== Track listing ==
Standard edition
No.	Title	Writer(s)	Producer(s)	Length
1.	"Drink to You" (featuring Zak Abel)	Guy James Robin; Richard Boardman; Daniel Boyle; Cleo Tighe; Jordan Riley	Jonas Blue; Jordan Riley	3:30
2.	"Mama" (featuring William Singe)	Robin; Samuel Romans; Edward Drewett	Blue	3:04
3.	"Perfect Strangers" (featuring JP Cooper)	Robin; Alexander Smith; John Paul Cooper	Blue	3:16
4.	"I See Love" (featuring Joe Jonas)	Robin; Joe Jonas; Mitch Allan; Louis Schoorl; Benjamin Hudson McIldowie	Blue	2:53
5.	"Polaroid" (featuring Liam Payne and Lennon Stella)	Robin; Romans; Drewett; Cooper	Blue	3:13
6.	"Desperate" (featuring Nina Nesbitt)	Robin; Julia Michaels; Jackson Foote; Patrick Nissley; David Katz	Blue; Jackson Foote; Jordan Riley	2:54
7.	"By Your Side" (featuring Raye)	Robin; Grace Barker; George Astasio; Jason Pebworth; Jonathan Shave; Christy Zakarias	Blue	3:21
8.	"Wild" (featuring Chelcee Grimes, Tini and Jhay Cortez)	Robin; Chelcee Grimes; Steve Mac; Jesus Cortez	Blue; Jordan Riley	3:32
9.	"Wherever You Go" (with Juan Magán featuring Jessie Reyez)	Robin; Jessica Reyez; Tobias Frelin; Björn Djupström; John Thomas Roach	Blue; Juan Magán	3:28
10.	"Purpose" (featuring Era Istrefi)	Robin; Barker; Smith; Era Istrefi; Zacharie Raymond; Yannick Yastogi	Blue; Banx & Ranx	2:50
11.	"Rise" (featuring Jack & Jack)	Robin; Romans; Drewett	Blue	3:14
12.	"Supernova" (with Dark Heart featuring Charlotte OC)	Robin; Willy Sinclair; Natalia Keery-Fisher; David Thomas	Blue; Dark Heart	3:07
13.	"We Could Go Back" (featuring Moelogo)	Robin; Janee Bennett; Edvard Forre Erfjord; Henrik Barman Michelsen	Blue	3:12
14.	"Come Through" (with Kaskade featuring Olivia Noelle)	Robin; Scott Friedman; Joni Fatora; Ryan Raddon; Finn Bjarnson; Richard Beynon	Blue; Kaskade; Bjarnson^{[b]}; Bynon^{[b]}	2:58
15.	"Fast Car" (featuring Dakota)	Tracy Chapman	Blue	3:32
Total length:				48:03

Japanese edition
No.	Title	Writer(s)	Producer(s)	Length
16.	"Alien" (featuring Sabrina Carpenter)	Robin; Carpenter; Janée Bennett	Blue	2:54
17.	"Perfect Strangers" (featuring JP Cooper (CMC$ Remix))	Robin; Smith; Cooper	Blue	2:06
18.	"Heartbeat" (with Dark Heart featuring Gina Kushka)	Robin; Thomas; Gina Kushka; Shave; Pebworth; Astasio	Blue; Dark Heart	3:32
Total length:				56:35

Deluxe edition
No.	Title	Writer(s)	Producer(s)	Length
19.	"Rise" (featuring Iz*One)	Robin; Romans; Drewett	Blue	3:12
20.	"What I Like About You" (featuring Theresa Rex)	Robin; Lene Dissing; Peter Bjørnskov	Blue	3:40
21.	"Ritual" (with Tiësto featuring Rita Ora)	Robin; Tijs Verwest; Grace Barker; Michael Stonebank; Wayne Hector; Fraser Thornycroft-Smith	Tiësto; Blue; Stonebank	3:19
22.	"I Wanna Dance"	Robin	Blue	3:05
23.	"Younger" (featuring Hrvy)	Robin; Romans	Blue; Cameron Gower Poole	3:14
Total length:				73:05

== Charts ==
=== Weekly charts ===
Chart (2018–19)	Peak position
Australian Albums (ARIA)	50
Belgian Albums (Ultratop Flanders)	58
Belgian Albums (Ultratop Wallonia)	189
Canadian Albums (Billboard)	78
Dutch Albums (Album Top 100)	78
French Albums (SNEP)	106
Irish Albums (IRMA)	35
Japan Hot Albums (Billboard Japan)	26
Japanese Albums (Oricon)	60
Lithuanian Albums (AGATA)	44
New Zealand Albums (RMNZ)	33
Scottish Albums (OCC)	48
UK Albums (OCC)	33
UK Dance Albums (OCC)	2
US Top Dance Albums (Billboard)	6

=== Year-end charts ===
Chart (2019)	Position
Australian Albums (ARIA)	88
Belgian Albums (Ultratop Flanders)	106
US Top Dance/Electronic Albums (Billboard)	15

Chart (2020)	Position
Belgian Albums (Ultratop Flanders)	129

== Certifications ==
Region	Certification	Certified units/sales
Australia (ARIA)	Platinum	70,000^{‡}
Denmark (IFPI Danmark)	Platinum	20,000^{‡}
Italy (FIMI)	Gold	25,000^{‡}
Mexico (AMPROFON)	Platinum	60,000^{‡}
New Zealand (RMNZ)	2× Platinum	30,000^{‡}
Poland (ZPAV)	2× Platinum	40,000^{‡}
Singapore (RIAS)	2× Platinum	20,000^{*}
United Kingdom (BPI)	Gold	100,000^{‡}
United States (RIAA)	Gold	500,000^{‡}
^{*} Sales figures based on certification alone.^{‡} Sales+streaming figures based on certification alone.
