= Christy Zakarias =

Indonesian humanitarian public figure

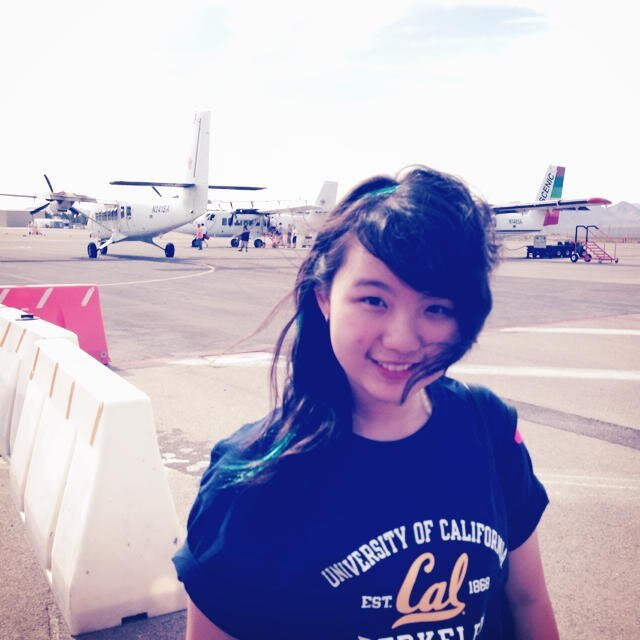
Christy Zakarias in 2015.

Christy Zakarias (born 19 July 1998), also known as Christy Zee, is an Indonesian humanitarian activist from Bekasi, Indonesia. She was the first Indonesian to receive the Diana Memorial Award in 2013. Zakarias was awarded by former British Prime Minister David Cameron and British diplomat Mark Canning for co-founding and leading Riveria, a charity that teaches underprivileged Indonesian children English.

Zakarias graduated from high school as a valedictorian from Sinarmas World Academy (SWA) in 2015. She then received a BSc with honours in neuroscience from University College London (UCL) in 2018.

Zakarias produced music and has worked with Dua Lipa, Conor Maynard, and Cheat Codes in the past under the pen name "Zee".

Zakarias also served as Indonesia's Youth delegate in the 2024 G20 summit, representing the country on policy negotiations related to climate change, energy transition, and sustainable development.

== Discography ==
=== Songwriting credits ===
- "Call Me Out" and "You Say" by Sarah Close
- "By Your Side" by Jonas Blue & Raye
- "Genesis" by Dua Lipa
- "Streets of Gold" by Isaiah Firebrace
- "Thinking About You" by Alex Aiono
- "Enemies" by Lauv

=== Mixing credits ===
- "Grenade" by G.O.A.T
- "This Is My Version" by Conor Maynard
- "Sober" by Cheat Codes & Nicky Romero

=== Arrangement credits ===
- "More" by The Citrus Clouds
