= Don't Wake Me Up (Jonas Blue and Why Don't We song) =

Single by Jonas Blue and Why Don't We

from the album Together
- Released: 7 January 2022
- Genre: Dance-pop
- Length: 3:08
- Label: Positiva
- Songwriter(s): Jonah Marais; Corbyn Besson; Daniel Seavey; Jack Avery; Zach Herron; Guy James Robin; Lukas Costas; Rebecca Krueger
- Producer(s): Jonas Blue

Jonas Blue singles chronology
"Sad Boy" (2021)	"Don't Wake Me Up" (2022)	"Angles" (2022)

Why Don't We singles chronology
"Mistletoe" (2021)	"Don't Wake Me Up" (2022)	"Let Me Down Easy (Lie)" (2022)

Music video
- "Don't Wake Me Up" on YouTube

"Don't Wake Me Up" is a song by English DJ and record producer Jonas Blue and American boy band Why Don't We, released on 7 January 2022 via Positiva Records. On July 13, 2022, a Japanese version was released with Japanese boy group BE:FIRST. The song was written by Blue, Lukas Costas, Rebecca Krueger and Why Don't We's members Jonah Marais, Corbyn Besson, Daniel Seavey, Jack Avery and Zach Herron, and produced by Blue.

== Background and content ==
Why Don't We contacted Jonas Blue on Twitter in 2019, where Blue praised the band's vocals. Blue said in a press release: "'Don't Wake Me Up' has a real depth to the lyrics. If you break it down, it's about finding your true love in your dream".

== Music video ==
An accompanying music video was released on 28 January 2022, and directed by Isaac Rentz. It depicts an "impromptu" party taking place in a Los Angeles parking lot, and was described by Vents Magazine as featuring "dancing, fast cars and the promise of romance".

== Credits and personnel ==
Credits adapted from Tidal.

- Jonas Blue – producer, composer, lyricist, associated performer, mixer, music production, programming, recording arranger, studio personal
- Why Don't We – composer, lyricist, associated performer, vocals
- Lukas Costas – composer
- Rebecca Krueger – composer
- Mitch Allan – associated performer, vocal producer
- Guy Phethean – keyboards
- Mike Marsh – mastering engineer, studio personal
- Caleb Hulin – studio personal, vocal engineer

== Charts ==
=== Weekly charts ===
Weekly chart performance for "Don't Wake Me Up"
Chart (2022)	Peak position
Belgium (Ultratop 50 Wallonia)	37
Czech Republic (Rádio – Top 100)	5
New Zealand Hot Singles (RMNZ)	15
Slovakia (Rádio Top 100)	40
UK Singles (OCC)	79
UK Dance (OCC)	24
US Hot Dance/Electronic Songs (Billboard)	13

=== Year-end charts ===
Year-end chart performance for "Don't Wake Me Up"
Chart (2022)	Position
US Hot Dance/Electronic Songs (Billboard)	62

== Certifications ==
Region	Certification	Certified units/sales
Brazil (Pro-Música Brasil)	Gold	20,000^{‡}
^{‡} Sales+streaming figures based on certification alone.

== Japanese version ==
On 13 July 2022, a version of "Don't Wake Me Up" featuring Japanese boy band Be:First was released.
