= By Your Side (Jonas Blue song) =

Single by Jonas Blue featuring Raye

from the album Blue
- Released: 28 October 2016
- Length: 3:21
- Label: Capitol; Positiva; Virgin EMI
- Songwriters: Zee; Guy James Robin; Grace Barker; Jason Pebworth; George Astasio; Jon Shave
- Producer: Jonas Blue

Jonas Blue singles chronology
"Perfect Strangers" (2016)	"By Your Side" (2016)	"Mama" (2017)

Raye singles chronology
"I, U, Us" (2016)	"By Your Side" (2016)	"You Don't Know Me" (2016)

Music video
- "By Your Side" on YouTube

"By Your Side" is a song by English DJ and record producer Jonas Blue featuring vocals from British singer-songwriter Raye. It was released as a digital download in the United Kingdom on 28 October 2016. It is the third single of his debut album, Blue (2018). A remix by PBH & Jack Shizzle was included on Blue's compilation album, Jonas Blue: Electronic Nature – The Mix 2017 (2017). "By Your Side" was written by Zee, Grace Barker, the Invisible Men, and Blue, who also produced the song.

== Music video ==
The official music video premiered on 16 November 2016 on YouTube via Jonas Blue's official Vevo channel.

== Track listing ==
Digital download
No.	Title	Length
1.	"By Your Side" (featuring Raye)	3:21

Digital download – Abbey Road live version
No.	Title	Length
1.	"By Your Side" (featuring Raye) (Abbey Road live version)	3:13

Digital download – remixes
No.	Title	Length
1.	"By Your Side" (featuring Raye) (Two Can remix)	3:33
2.	"By Your Side" (featuring Raye) (Madison Mars remix)	4:27
3.	"By Your Side" (featuring Raye and Eyez) (Zdot remix)	4:03
4.	"By Your Side" (featuring Raye) (DC Breaks remix)	5:12

Digital download – remixes part 2
No.	Title	Length
1.	"By Your Side" (featuring Raye) (Billon remix)	5:32
2.	"By Your Side" (featuring Raye) (Sonny Fodera remix)	6:21

== Charts ==
=== Weekly charts ===
Chart (2016–17)	Peak position
Australia (ARIA)	33
Austria (Ö3 Austria Top 40)	56
Belgium (Ultratop 50 Flanders)	45
Belgium (Ultratop 50 Wallonia)	44
Czech Republic Airplay (ČNS IFPI)	41
Czech Republic Singles Digital (ČNS IFPI)	35
France (SNEP)	110
Germany (GfK)	45
Hungary (Rádiós Top 40)	32
Ireland (IRMA)	13
Italy (FIMI)	46
Mexico Airplay (Billboard)	33
Netherlands (Dutch Top 40)	28
Netherlands (Single Top 100)	35
Poland Airplay (ZPAV)	3
Portugal (AFP)	52
Scottish Singles Sales (Official Charts)	4
Slovakia Airplay (ČNS IFPI)	47
Slovakia Singles Digital (ČNS IFPI)	33
Spain (Promusicae)	47
Sweden (Sverigetopplistan)	94
Switzerland (Schweizer Hitparade)	50
UK Singles (Official Charts)	15
UK Dance (Official Charts)	6
US Dance Club Songs (Billboard)	14
US Hot Dance/Electronic Songs (Billboard)	17

=== Year-end charts ===
Chart (2017)	Position
Poland (ZPAV)	31
US Hot Dance/Electronic Songs (Billboard)	52

== Certifications ==
Region	Certification	Certified units/sales
Australia (ARIA)	2× Platinum	140,000^{‡}
Brazil (Pro-Música Brasil)	Platinum	60,000^{‡}
Denmark (IFPI Danmark)	Gold	45,000^{‡}
France (SNEP)	Gold	66,666^{‡}
Germany (BVMI)	Gold	200,000^{‡}
Italy (FIMI)	Platinum	50,000^{‡}
Mexico (AMPROFON)	Platinum	60,000^{‡}
New Zealand (RMNZ)	Platinum	30,000^{‡}
Spain (Promusicae)	Gold	20,000^{‡}
United Kingdom (BPI)	Platinum	600,000^{‡}
United States (RIAA)	Gold	500,000^{‡}
^{‡} Sales+streaming figures based on certification alone.

== Release history ==
Region	Date	Format	Label	Ref.
Worldwide	28 October 2016	Digital download	Jonas Blue Music	
United Kingdom	28 October 2016	Digital download	Capitol; Positiva; Virgin EMI	
Worldwide	9 December 2016	Digital download – Abbey Road Live version	Jonas Blue Music	
Worldwide	16 December 2016	Digital download – remixes	Jonas Blue Music	
Worldwide	27 January 2017	Digital download – remixes part 2	Jonas Blue Music	
