= What I Like About You (Jonas Blue song) =

Single by Jonas Blue featuring Theresa Rex

from the album Blue (Deluxe edition)
- Released: 22 March 2019
- Length: 3:40
- Label: Positiva; Virgin EMI
- Songwriters: Lene Dissing; Peter Bjørnskov; Guy James Robin
- Producer: Jonas Blue

Jonas Blue singles chronology
"Wild" (2019)	"What I Like About You" (2019)	"Ritual" (2019)

Theresa Rex singles chronology
"Wild Ones" (2018)	"What I Like About You" (2019)	"Like I Love You" (2019)

Music video
- "What I Like About You" on YouTube

"What I Like About You" is a song by English DJ and record producer Jonas Blue featuring vocals from Danish singer Theresa Rex. It was released as a digital download on 22 March 2019 by Positiva and Virgin EMI Records. The song was written by Lene Dissing, Peter Bjørnskov and Blue, who also produced the song.

== Background ==
In an interview with Metro, Blue said, "It's such a special song and for me, I lyrically took it back to where 'Fast Car' is in terms of lyrics and song. But what I like about it, is it's captured the spirit and feel of early love. It's a relationship that turned rebellious and the idea is that this person, this woman goes against the wishes of all her friends and family about being in this relationship. But she does it anyway because of the power of love and the way she feels about this person. I think a lot of people have been in that situation before and they can relate to it. But we make a positive."

== Charts ==
=== Weekly charts ===
Chart (2019)	Peak position
Belgium (Ultratop 50 Flanders)	44
Belgium Dance (Ultratop Flanders)	7
Czech Republic (Singles Digitál Top 100)	65
Germany (GfK)	93
Ireland (IRMA)	15
Lithuania (AGATA)	32
Netherlands (Dutch Top 40)	25
Netherlands (Single Top 100)	89
New Zealand Hot Singles (RMNZ)	22
Scotland Singles (OCC)	15
Slovakia (Singles Digitál Top 100)	60
Sweden Heatseeker (Sverigetopplistan)	1
Switzerland (Schweizer Hitparade)	76
UK Singles (OCC)	16
UK Dance (OCC)	4
US Hot Dance/Electronic Songs (Billboard)	13

=== Year-end charts ===
Chart (2019)	Position
UK Singles (Official Charts Company)	100
US Hot Dance/Electronic Songs (Billboard)	55

== Certifications ==
Certifications for "What I Like About You"
Region	Certification	Certified units/sales
Australia (ARIA)	Platinum	70,000^{‡}
Brazil (Pro-Música Brasil)	Platinum	40,000^{‡}
Denmark (IFPI Danmark)	Gold	45,000^{‡}
Italy (FIMI)	Gold	35,000^{‡}
New Zealand (RMNZ)	Gold	15,000^{‡}
Poland (ZPAV)	Gold	25,000^{‡}
Portugal (AFP)	Gold	5,000^{‡}
United Kingdom (BPI)	Platinum	600,000^{‡}
^{‡} Sales+streaming figures based on certification alone.

== Release history ==
Region	Date	Format	Label
United Kingdom	22 March 2019	Digital download; streaming	Positiva, Virgin EMI
