= Be First =

Japanese boy band

Be:First
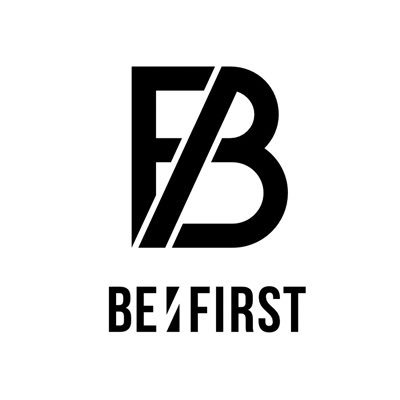
- Logo of Be:First

Background information
- Origin: Japan
- Genre: J-pop
- Years active: 2021–present
- Labels: BMSG; B-Me
- Members: Sota; Shunto; Manato; Ryuhei; Junon; Leo
- Past members: Ryoki
- Website: befirst.tokyo

Be:First (stylized in all caps) is a Japanese boy band formed and managed by BMSG and signed to B-ME, a joint record label with Avex. The group was formed on November 3, 2021, through the reality competition show The First, which is hosted by Sky-Hi and debuted on August 31, 2022 with heir studio album Be:1. The group consists of six members: Sota, Shunto, Manato, Ryuhei, Junon, and Leo; Ryoki left the band in 2025.

The group is BMSG's first act. Sky-Hi created the company after identifying issues in the Japanese music industry, including a lack of opportunities for talent to showcase themselves, which led talented performers to leave Japan for the wider opportunities offered by the Korean music industry.

== Name ==
The group's name, Be:First, was chosen with the intention of "always aiming for the top", and Sky-Hi hopes that the group will "continue to respect and love the fact that others are number one at the same time as they continue to be number one themselves". Their official fandom name is Besty (stylized in all caps), which was coined by combining the first and last two letters of the group's name to mean bestie (best friend).

== History ==
=== 2021: Formation and debut ===
On April 2, the audition of The First (stylized in all caps) started airing on Nippon Television Network's information program Sukkiri and online streaming service Hulu. On August 13, the group name and members were announced on the last episode of the audition program. On August 16, the group's digital pre-debut track, "Shining One", was released.

On the Billboard Japan chart released on August 25, their digital pre-debut track, "Shining One", made its first appearance at number one on the Download Songs, number two on the Streaming Songs, and number two on the overall Japan Hot 100. The song was also ranked number one on the Oricon Weekly Digital Single ranking on the same day, and ranked first on the Oricon Weekly Streaming ranking. Be:First became the second artist in history to achieve this double crown as the same work has simultaneously reached number one in both the weekly digital single and streaming rankings.

Despite their pre-debut, Be:First performed on several TV programs, including NTV's Sukkiri (August 25) and Buzz Rhythm 02 (September 10), NHK's Shibuya no Oto (September 11), and TV Tokyo's Premiere Melodix! (September 11). The group was also featured in the industry magazine Nikkei Entertainment. Be:First appeared on September 18 as the opening act at SuperSonic 2021, a music festival held as an alternative event to Summer Sonic Festival, and gave their first performance in front of an audience.

On 3rd November, they made their major debut with the release of their first single "Gifted", which topped the Billboard Japan Hot 100. Within a week of the release, it had more than 14 million streams, the third-highest number of weekly streams in Oricon history behind BTS and LiSA.

=== 2022–present: Be:1 and Watch Me ===
Be:First collaborated with Jonas Blue to release the Japanese version of "Don't Wake Me Up" on July 13, 2022. The group released their debut studio album Be:1 (stylized in all caps) on August 31, preceded by their first two singles, "Gifted.", and "Bye-Good-Bye". The album topped the Billboard Japan Hot Albums chart. Be:1 was certified Gold by the Recording Industry Association of Japan for having sold over 100,000 copies, with them later embarking on their first national tour, Be:First 1st One Man Tour "Be:1" 2022–2023

They released a number of charting songs in 2022 and 2023, including the number-one songs "Bye-Good-Bye", "Scream", "Boom Boom Back" and "Mainstream". Following the digital release of "Bye-Good-Bye", Be:First became the first artist in Oricon history to achieve number one rankings in both downloads and streams in same week for a single work three times – the previous two being "Shining One" and "Gifted". In another achievement, with the release of "Scream" Be:First became the first artist to have five songs win two number-one Oricon digital-ranking titles for a single work within the same week. With "Boom Boom Back", Be:First achieved their seventh number one on Oricon's Weekly Digital Song chart. The song also was number one on the Streaming chart, giving them a digital "double crown", thus breaking their own record and making them artist with the most digital double crowns for a single work in history. They continued break records when Mainstream topped both the Oricon Digital Song Ranking and Streaming Ranking, bringing their total number of digital "double crowns" to seven, the most for any artist in Oricon history.

They embarked on their Be:First Arena Tour 2023–2024 "Mainstream", their first national arena tour. It was held from November 1, 2023, to February 24, 2024, in nine cities, featuring a total of 22 shows. They further added four more shows for March and April, Be:First Live in Dome 2024 "Mainstream" – Masterplan, with two shows each at the Tokyo Dome and Kyocera Dome.

In 2025, they embarked on their first world tour, BE:FIRST World Tour 2025 ~ Who is BE:FIRST? The tour included stops in the USA, Europe and Asia. Ryoki did not participate in the European leg of the tour due to illness.

From November 1, 2025, to February 15, 2026, they embarked on their second fan meeting tour, BE:FIRST 2nd Fan Meeting -Hello My "BESTY" vol.2-, their first fan meeting tour in approximately four years. The tour was held across 10 cities in Japan, featuring a total of 23 shows.

On May 16 and 17, 2026, they held their first stadium concerts, BE:FIRST Stadium Live 2026 We are the "BE:ST", at Ajinomoto Stadium.

From September 25 to October 23, 2026, they are scheduled to hold their second world tour, BE:FIRST WORLD SHOWCASE 2026, with performances in Bangkok, Thailand; Taipei, Taiwan; Manila, the Philippines; and New York City, United States.

An additional show in New York City on October 22, 2026 was announced on June 14, 2026.

In July 2026, the group released "Bruce Wayne", featuring Flo Milli & ATL Jacob, as the lead single to their EP Watch Me, which is scheduled to release on September 18, 2026.

== Members ==
Current members

- Sota (島雄 壮大, Shimao Sōta)
- Shunto (久保 舜斗, Kubo Shunto)
- Manato (廣瀨 真人, Hirose Manato)
- Ryuhei (黒田 竜平, Kuroda Ryūhei)
- Junon (池亀 樹音, Ikegame Junon)
- Leo (上村 礼王, Kamimura Reo)

Former members

- Ryoki (三山 凌輝, Miyama Ryōki) (2021–2025)

== Discography ==
=== Studio albums ===
List of studio albums, with selected details, chart positions, sales, and certifications
Title	Details	Peak chart positions			Sales	Certifications
Title	Details	JPN	JPN Cmb.	JPN Hot	Sales	Certifications
Be:1	Released: August 31, 2022; Label: B-Me; Formats: CD, CD+DVD, CD+BD, LP, DL, streaming	1	1	1	JPN: 185,563	RIAJ: Gold
2:Be	Released: August 26, 2024; Label: B-Me; Formats: CD, CD+DVD, CD+BD, LP, DL, streaming	1	1	1	JPN: 106,908	RIAJ: Gold
Be:4U	Released: November 3, 2026; Label: B-Me; Formats: CD, CD+DVD, CD+BD, DL, streaming	1	1	2	JPN: 92,730	

=== Compilation albums ===
List of compilation albums, with selected details, chart positions and sales
Title	Details	Peak chart positions			Sales	Certifications
Title	Details	JPN	JPN Cmb.	JPN Hot	Sales	Certifications
Be:st	Released: October 29, 2025; Label: B-Me; Formats: CD, CD+DVD, CD+BD, DL, streaming	4	3	2	JPN: 93,712	RIAJ: Gold

=== Extended plays ===
List of extended plays, with selected details, and chart positions
Title	Details	Peaks		
Title	Details	JPN Cmb.	US	US World
Watch Me	Released: September 18, 2026; Label: B-Me; Formats: CD, DL, streaming	7	130	3

=== Singles ===
List of singles, with selected chart positions, showing year released, sales, certifications, and album name
Title	Year	Peaks			Sales	Certifications	Album
Title	Year	JPN	JPN Cmb.	JPN Hot	Sales	Certifications	Album
"Gifted."	2021	2	2	1		RIAJ: Platinum (phy.); Gold (st.)	Be:1
"Bye-Good-Bye"	2022	3	2	1		RIAJ: Gold (phy.); Platinum (st.)	Be:1
"Smile Again"	2023	2	2	2	JPN: 134,934	RIAJ: Gold (phy.); Gold (st.)	2:Be
"Salvia"	2023	—	8	41			Be:st
"Mainstream"	2023	2	2	1	JPN: 146,893	RIAJ: Gold (phy.); Platinum (st.)	2:Be
"Masterplan"	2024	2	2	1	JPN: 109,557	RIAJ: Gold (phy.); Gold (st.)	2:Be
"Hush-Hush" (with Ateez)	2024	—	6	1			2:Be
"Royal" (with Ateez)	2024	—	—	22			Non-album singles
"Sailing"	2024	1	1	4	JPN: 100,509	RIAJ: Gold (phy.); Gold (st.)	Be:st
"Spacecraft"	2025	1	1	1	JPN: 100,509	RIAJ: Gold (phy.)	Be:st
"Grit"	2025	2	2	1	JPN: 100,039	RIAJ: Gold (phy.)	Be:st
"Under the Same Sky"	2025	2	2	2	JPN: 77,568		Be:st
"Stare in Wonder"	2025	—	8	3			Be:st
"Be First All Day"	2026	4	8	1	JPN: 52,823		Be:4U
"Doesn't Really Matter" (remix) (with Janet Jackson)	2026	—	— (Note: "Doesn't Really Matter" (Remix) did not enter the Oricon Combined Singles Chart, but peaked at number 2 on the Digital Singles Chart.)	12	JPN: 8,268		Non-album single
"Missing"	2026	1	1	1	JPN: 94,108	RIAJ: Gold (phy.)	Be:4U
"Bruce Wayne" (featuring Flo Milli and ATL Jacob)	2026	—	35	18			Watch Me
"Watch Me" (featuring Bia)	2026	—	26	24			Watch Me
"—" denotes releases that did not chart or were not released in that region.

=== Promotional singles ===
List of promotional singles, with selected chart positions, showing year released, certifications, and album name
Title	Year	Peaks		Certifications	Album
Title	Year	JPN Cmb.	JPN Hot	Certifications	Album
"Shining One"	2021	3	2	RIAJ: Gold (st.)	Be:1
"Kick Start"	2021	5	7		"Gifted."
"Brave Generation"	2022	7	6		Be:1
"Betrayal Game"	2022	3	3	RIAJ: Gold (st.)	Be:1
"Don't Wake Me Up" (with Jonas Blue)	2022	26	16		Together
"Scream"	2022	3	1		Be:1
"Boom Boom Back"	2023	2	1	RIAJ: Platinum (st.)	2:Be
"Glorious"	2023	10	7		2:Be
"Set Sail"	2024	9	12		"Masterplan"
"Gifted" (orchestra version)	2024	8	13		Be:st
"Blissful"	2024	2	1	RIAJ: Gold (st.)	2:Be
"Muchū"	2025	14	13	RIAJ: 2× Platinum (st.)	Be:st
"Secret Garden"	2025	6	2		Be:st
"I Want You Back"	2025	8	4		Be:st
"Lighting Up the Town"	2025	6	1		Be:4U
"It's Not a Bad Life"	2026	32	18		Be:4U
"—" denotes releases that did not chart or were not released in that region.

=== Other charted songs ===
List of other charted songs, with selected chart positions, showing year released and album name
Title	Year	Peaks		Album
Title	Year	JPN Cmb.	JPN Hot	Album
"BF Is..."	2022	—	70	Be:1
"Great Mistakes"	2023	—	80	"Smile Again"
"Rondo"	2026	—	14	"Be First All Day"
"Why, Why"	2026	—	52	"Missing"
"Now U Know"	2026	7	2	Be:4U
"—" denotes releases that did not chart or were not released in that region.

== Awards and nominations ==
Name of the award ceremony, year presented, award category, nominee(s) of the award, and the result of the nomination
Award ceremony	Year	Category	Nominee(s)/work(s)	Result	Ref.
MTV Video Music Awards Japan	2025	Best Editing	"Masterplan"	Won	
Japan Record Awards	2022	Excellent Work Award	"Bye-Good-Bye"	Won	
Japan Record Awards	2023	Excellent Work Award	"Mainstream"	Won	
Japan Record Awards	2024	Excellent Work Award	"Masterplan"	Won	
Japan Record Awards	2025	Excellent Work Award	"Muchu"	Won	
