= Moelogo =

British-Nigerian musical artist (born 1990)

- Born: Mohammed Basit Abiola Isola Animashaun; 13 April 1990 (age 35); Lagos State, Nigeria
- Genres: Afrobeats; R&B; Hip hop
- Occupations: Singer; Songwriter
- Instrument: Vocals
- Years active: 2013–present
- Website: https://moelogo.com

Mohammed Basit Abiola Isola Animashaun, popularly known as Moelogo (born 13 April 1990), is a British–Nigerian singer-songwriter, he has songwriting credits for some notable music projects, including Tiwa Savage's Celia.

== Early life ==
Moelogo was born in Lagos and he moved to London in 2001. He joined school choir at 14, discovering his talent and passion, he proceeded with London's Starlight Music Academy.

== Career ==
In 2013, Moelogo released his debut EP Moe Is My Name, Music Is My Logo.

In 2016, he bagged a nomination for Best African Artist at Mobo Award,

In 2017, his contribution in Jonas Blue's single "We Could Go Back" as a featured artist scored him a UK Singles Chart entry. The single peaked at No. 74. It also charted in US Dance/Electronic Songs chart peaking at No. 34. It also charted in Belgium, Sweden and New Zealand.

In 2018, Moelogo signed publishing deal with Downtown Records.

== Discography ==
=== EPs/Album ===
- Moe Is My Name, Music Is My Logo EP (2013)
- Ireti (2016)
- Magic (2019)
- Me (2020)
- Myself (2020)

=== Selected singles ===
- "Penkele" (2016)
- "Rora Se" feat. Adekunle Gold (2016)
- "Penkele" Remix feat.Davido & Sarkodie (2016)
- "Happy" feat. Adekunle Gold (2018)

=== Collaboration ===
- "Only Girl" – Adekunle Gold (2017)
- "We Could Go Back" – Jonas Blue (2017)
- "Education" - Tobinsco (2018)
- "Ohemaa" – M.anifest (2019)
- "Give You All" – King Lekan (2020)
- "Come Back" – Sarkodie (2021)

== Award and nominations ==
He has received many Accolades and nominations:

Year	Awards ceremony	Award description(s)	Recipient	Results	Ref
2015	Mobo Awards	Best African Artist	Null	Nominated	
2015	Nigeria Entertainment Awards	Diaspora Artist of the Year	Null	Nominated	
2017	Nigeria Entertainment Awards	Most Promising Act to Watch	Null	Nominated	
2017	Nigeria Entertainment Awards	Best Collabo (Adekunle Gold feat. Moelogo)	Null	Nominated	
2020	The Headies 2020	Best Alternative Song)	1	Won	
