= Hear Me Say =

Single by Jonas Blue and Léon

from the album Together
- Released: 28 May 2021
- Genre: House; pop
- Length: 3:10
- Label: Positiva
- Songwriter(s): Daniel James; David Brook; Guy James Robin; Leah Haywood; Lotta Lindgren; Miya Miya; Rob Ellmore
- Producer(s): Jonas Blue

Jonas Blue singles chronology
"Something Stupid" (2021)	"Hear Me Say" (2021)	"Sad Boy" (2021)

Léon singles chronology
"Head and Heart on Fire" (2020)	"Hear Me Say" (2021)	"Dancer" (2021)

Music video
- "Hear Me Say" on YouTube

"Hear Me Say" is a song by English DJ and record producer Jonas Blue and Swedish singer Léon. It was released on 28 May 2021 via Positiva Records. The song was written by Daniel James, David Brook, Léon, Leah Haywood, Miya Miya, Rob Ellmore and Blue, who also produced the song.

== Composition ==
The song is written in the key of F major, with a tempo of 122 beats per minute.

== Critical reception ==
The website Popjuice commented that the song "is sure to be played at parties everywhere as lockdowns slowly begin to lift around the world." Rachel Hammermueller of Earmilk described the track's "voice and quality feels right at home." And becomes "a choice tune to welcome the summer."

== Music video ==
The music video was released on 2 July 2021, and directed by Alex Nicholson. The video was filmed in Mexico. It makes "a perfect summer day", including scenes of "lounging on a boat, running through the sand on a beach, exploring the tropics of a lagoon or hanging out in a beach house."

== Track listing ==
Digital download
No.	Title	Length
1.	"Hear Me Say"	3:10

Digital download – acoustic
No.	Title	Length
1.	"Hear Me Say" (acoustic)	2:29

Digital download – remixes
No.	Title	Length
1.	"Hear Me Say" (Kream remix)	3:13
2.	"Hear Me Say" (Extended remix)	4:21

Digital download – Ferreck Dawn remix
No.	Title	Length
1.	"Hear Me Say" (Ferreck Dawn remix)	2:38

Digital download – Soda State remix
No.	Title	Length
1.	"Hear Me Say" (Soda State remix)	3:48

== Credits and personnel ==
Credits adapted from AllMusic.

- Jonas Blue – mixing, musical producer, primary artist, producer, recording arranger, composer
- David Brook – composer
- Dreamlab – vocal producer
- Rob Ellmore – composer
- Leah Haywood – composer
- Léon – composer, primary artist, vocals
- Mike Marsh – mastering engineer
- Miya Miya – composer, vocals
- Guy Phethean – keyboards

== Charts ==
=== Weekly charts ===
Weekly chart performance for "Hear Me Say"
Chart (2021)	Peak position
Ireland (IRMA)	76
New Zealand Hot Singles (RMNZ)	35
Sweden Heatseeker (Sverigetopplistan)	3
UK Singles (OCC)	65
US Hot Dance/Electronic Songs (Billboard)	19

=== Year-end charts ===
Year-end chart performance for "Hear Me Say"
Chart (2021)	Position
US Hot Dance/Electronic Songs (Billboard)	65

== Certifications ==
Certifications for "Hear Me Say"
Region	Certification	Certified units/sales
Brazil (Pro-Música Brasil)	Gold	20,000^{‡}
^{‡} Sales+streaming figures based on certification alone.
