= Hearts Ain't Gonna Lie =

Single by Arlissa and Jonas Blue

from the album Est. 1989
- Released: 5 January 2018
- Length: 3:21
- Label: Virgin EMI Records
- Songwriter(s): John Clare; James Tadgell; Arlissa Ruppert; Sinai Tedros; Guy Robin
- Producer(s): Jonas Blue

Arlissa singles chronology
"Not In Love" (2016)	"Hearts Ain't Gonna Lie" (2018)	"We Won't Move" (2018)

Jonas Blue singles chronology
"We Could Go Back" (2017)	"Hearts Ain't Gonna Lie" (2018)	"Alien" (2018)

"Hearts Ain't Gonna Lie" is a song by British singer-songwriter Arlissa and British DJ and record producer Jonas Blue. It was released as a digital download on 5 January 2018 via Virgin EMI Records.

== Music video ==
A music video to accompany the release of "Hearts Ain't Gonna Lie" was first released onto YouTube on 18 January 2018 at a total length of three minutes and twenty-two seconds.

== Charts ==
=== Weekly charts ===
Chart (2018)	Peak position
Belgium (Ultratip Bubbling Under Flanders)	42
Belgium (Ultratip Bubbling Under Wallonia)	24
Sweden Heatseeker (Sverigetopplistan)	16
US Dance Club Songs (Billboard)	8
US Hot Dance/Electronic Songs (Billboard)	26
US Pop Airplay (Billboard)	40

=== Year-end charts ===
Chart (2018)	Position
US Hot Dance/Electronic Songs (Billboard)	93

== Certifications ==
Region	Certification	Certified units/sales
United Kingdom (BPI)	Gold	400,000^{‡}
^{‡} Sales+streaming figures based on certification alone.
