= We Could Go Back =

Single by Jonas Blue featuring Moelogo

from the album Blue
- Released: 13 October 2017
- Length: 3:12
- Label: Jonas Blue Music
- Songwriter(s): Edvard Førre Erfjord; Henrik Barman Michelsen; Janee Bennett; Guy James Robin

Jonas Blue singles chronology
"Mama" (2017)	"We Could Go Back" (2017)	"Hearts Ain't Gonna Lie" (2018)

"We Could Go Back" is a song by British DJ and record producer Jonas Blue, featuring vocals from Moelogo. It was released as a digital download on 13 October 2017 via Blue's record label Jonas Blue Music. It’s the fifth single of Blue’s debut album Blue.

== Music video ==
A music video to accompany the release of "We Could Go Back" was first released onto YouTube on 26 October 2017 at a total length of three minutes and forty-four seconds.

== Charts ==
Chart (2017)	Peak position
Belgium (Ultratip Bubbling Under Flanders)	3
Belgium (Ultratop 50 Wallonia)	49
Hungary (Rádiós Top 40)	31
New Zealand Heatseekers (RMNZ)	7
Sweden Heatseeker (Sverigetopplistan)	8
UK Singles (OCC)	74
US Hot Dance/Electronic Songs (Billboard)	34
