= I See Love (song) =

Single by Jonas Blue featuring Joe Jonas

from the album Blue
- Released: 29 June 2018
- Recorded: 2018
- Genre: Dance
- Length: 2:53
- Label: Virgin EMI
- Songwriters: Guy James Robin; Joe Jonas; Mitch Allan; Louis Schoorl; Benjamin Hudson McIldowie
- Producer: Jonas Blue

Jonas Blue singles chronology
"Rise" (2018)	"I See Love" (2018)	"Back & Forth" (2018)

Joe Jonas singles chronology
"Longer Than I Thought" (2018)	"I See Love" (2018)	"It's Party Time" (2018)

"I See Love" is a song by British DJ and record producer Jonas Blue, featuring vocals from Joe Jonas. It was released as a digital download on 29 June 2018 via Virgin EMI Records as the seventh single from Blue's Blue. The song features in the film Hotel Transylvania 3: Summer Vacation.

== Background ==
Spring Aspers, Head of Sony Motion Pictures Music Group said "Jonas Blue is a world-renowned talent and we’re thrilled to have him be part of the family. His collaboration with Joe Jonas on 'I See Love' perfectly captures the summer, tropical vibe of our film and we’re excited for audiences to hear this song and join us on our epic summer adventure! We're also delighted for the chance to work with Joe Jonas not only for 'I See Love' but on our film. Joe joined the Hotel Transylvania family as the voice of Kraken, a loving blue sea creature that only wishes to sing and perform for everyone onboard the Legacy cruise ship, and we know audiences will fall in love with his character – and song – just like we did!".

== Critical reception ==
Phil Knott from Billboard said "The song captures the feeling of being on summer vacation and follows the animated cast through various scenes that will be included in the film, hitting theaters July 13".

== Official video ==
A clip in the movie for the song with the lyrics displayed in different places with cool effects to accompany the release of "I See Love" was first released onto YouTube on 29 June 2018 at a total length of two minutes and fifty-two seconds.

== Track listing ==
Digital download
No.	Title	Length
1.	"I See Love" (featuring Joe Jonas) (from Hotel Transylvania 3: Summer Vacation)	2:53

== Charts ==
Chart (2018)	Peak position
Belarus Airplay (Eurofest)	11
Russia Airplay (Tophit)	7
Sweden Heatseeker (Sverigetopplistan)	20
US Hot Dance/Electronic Songs (Billboard)	49

== Certifications ==
Certifications for "I See Love"
Region	Certification	Certified units/sales
Brazil (Pro-Música Brasil)	Gold	20,000^{‡}
^{‡} Sales+streaming figures based on certification alone.

== Release history ==
Region	Date	Format	Label
United Kingdom	29 June 2018	Digital download	Virgin EMI
