= Perfect Strangers (Jonas Blue song) =

Single by Jonas Blue featuring JP Cooper

from the album Blue
- Released: 3 June 2016
- Genre: Tropical house
- Length: 3:16
- Label: Capitol; Positiva; Virgin EMI
- Songwriters: Guy James Robin; John Paul Cooper; Alex Smith
- Producer: Jonas Blue

Jonas Blue singles chronology
"Fast Car" (2015)	"Perfect Strangers" (2016)	"By Your Side" (2016)

JP Cooper singles chronology
"Five More Days" (2016)	"Perfect Strangers" (2016)	"Party" (2016)

"Perfect Strangers" is a song by British record producer Jonas Blue featuring vocals from singer JP Cooper, released through Capitol, Positiva, and Virgin EMI Records on 3 June 2016 as the second single from Blue's debut studio album Blue (2018). The song peaked at number two on the UK Singles Chart, and reached the top 10 positions in eight additional countries, including Germany, Australia, and Sweden. A Japanese version of the song by South Korean girl group AOA was released on their album Runway (2016).

The song was played at the inauguration of the 2019 UEFA Europa League Final between English teams Chelsea F.C. vs. Arsenal F.C.

== Music video ==
A music video to accompany the release of "Perfect Strangers" was first released onto YouTube on 14 June 2016 at a total length of three minutes and twenty-seven seconds. The video is set and filmed in Cape Town in South Africa. It features a woman (Victoria Scholtz) always coincidentally meeting the same man (Devin Dollery) wherever she goes. They then ally together to help bring fun to the children in South Africa, with the man introducing them to skateboarding and the woman introducing them to breakdancing while falling in love in the process.

== Track listing ==
Digital download
No.	Title	Length
1.	"Perfect Strangers" (featuring JP Cooper)	3:16

Digital download – acoustic
No.	Title	Length
1.	"Perfect Strangers" (featuring JP Cooper) (acoustic)	3:11

Digital download – remixes
No.	Title	Length
1.	"Perfect Strangers" (featuring JP Cooper) (club mix)	5:14
2.	"Perfect Strangers" (featuring JP Cooper) (Gregor Salto remix)	4:00
3.	"Perfect Strangers" (featuring JP Cooper) (Jerome Price remix)	4:44
4.	"Perfect Strangers" (featuring JP Cooper) (Bump & Flex remix)	5:32
5.	"Perfect Strangers" (featuring JP Cooper) (Pedro Carrilho remix)	4:34

== Charts ==
=== Weekly charts ===
Chart (2016–2017)	Peak position
Australia (ARIA)	6
Austria (Ö3 Austria Top 40)	9
Belgium (Ultratop 50 Flanders)	4
Belgium (Ultratop 50 Wallonia)	22
Canada Hot 100 (Billboard)	46
Czech Republic Airplay (ČNS IFPI)	6
Czech Republic Singles Digital (ČNS IFPI)	7
Denmark (Tracklisten)	11
France (SNEP)	13
Germany (GfK)	9
Hungary (Dance Top 40)	32
Hungary (Rádiós Top 40)	6
Hungary (Single Top 40)	9
Ireland (IRMA)	2
Italy (FIMI)	19
Mexico Airplay (Billboard)	2
Lebanon (Lebanese Top 20)	11
Netherlands (Dutch Top 40)	2
Netherlands (Single Top 100)	3
New Zealand (Recorded Music NZ)	8
Norway (VG-lista)	7
Poland Airplay (ZPAV)	1
Portugal (AFP)	4
Romania (Media Forest)	6
Russia Airplay (Tophit)	11
Scotland Singles (OCC)	2
Serbia (Radiomonitor)	1
Slovakia Airplay (ČNS IFPI)	8
Slovakia Singles Digital (ČNS IFPI)	4
Slovenia (SloTop50)	11
South Africa (EMA)	6
Spain (Promusicae)	11
Sweden (Sverigetopplistan)	3
Switzerland (Schweizer Hitparade)	8
UK Singles (OCC)	2
UK Dance (OCC)	1
US Bubbling Under Hot 100 (Billboard)	11
US Dance Club Songs (Billboard)	1
US Hot Dance/Electronic Songs (Billboard)	11

2025 Weekly chart performance for "Perfect Strangers"
Chart (2025)	Peak position
Moldova Airplay (TopHit)	72

=== Year-end charts ===
Chart (2016)	Position
Australia (ARIA)	41
Austria (Ö3 Austria Top 40)	52
Belgium (Ultratop Flanders)	36
Belgium (Ultratop Wallonia)	91
Denmark (Tracklisten)	60
France (SNEP)	95
Germany (Official German Charts)	50
Hungary (Single Top 40)	65
Iceland (Plötutíóindi)	29
Italy (FIMI)	67
Netherlands (Dutch Top 40)	12
Netherlands (Single Top 100)	23
Poland (ZPAV)	31
Spain (PROMUSICAE)	66
Sweden (Sverigetopplistan)	31
Switzerland (Schweizer Hitparade)	50
UK Singles (Official Charts Company)	29
US Dance Club Songs (Billboard)	47
US Hot Dance/Electronic Songs (Billboard)	27

Chart (2017)	Position
Hungary (Rádiós Top 40)	17

Chart (2024)	Position
Lithuania Airplay (TopHit)	111

Chart (2025)	Position
Lithuania Airplay (TopHit)	167

== Certifications ==
Region	Certification	Certified units/sales
Australia (ARIA)	5× Platinum	350,000^{‡}
Belgium (BRMA)	Platinum	20,000^{‡}
Brazil (Pro-Música Brasil)	Diamond	250,000^{‡}
Canada (Music Canada)	Platinum	80,000^{‡}
Denmark (IFPI Danmark)	2× Platinum	180,000^{‡}
France (SNEP)	Diamond	333,333^{‡}
Germany (BVMI)	Platinum	400,000^{‡}
Italy (FIMI)	3× Platinum	150,000^{‡}
Mexico (AMPROFON)	2× Platinum+Gold	150,000^{‡}
Netherlands (NVPI)	4× Platinum	160,000^{‡}
New Zealand (RMNZ)	3× Platinum	90,000^{‡}
Poland (ZPAV)	3× Platinum	60,000^{‡}
Portugal (AFP)	Platinum	10,000^{‡}
Spain (Promusicae)	2× Platinum	120,000^{‡}
Sweden (GLF)	3× Platinum	120,000^{‡}
United Kingdom (BPI)	3× Platinum	1,800,000^{‡}
United States (RIAA)	Gold	500,000^{‡}
^{‡} Sales+streaming figures based on certification alone.

== Release history ==
Region	Date	Format	Label	Ref.
United Kingdom	3 June 2016	Digital download	Capitol; Positiva; Virgin EMI	
Worldwide	15 July 2016	Digital download – acoustic	Jonas Blue Music	
Worldwide	22 July 2016	Digital download – remixes	Jonas Blue Music	
