= Rise (Jonas Blue song) =

Single by Jonas Blue featuring Jack & Jack

from the album Blue
- Released: 25 May 2018
- Length: 3:13
- Label: Positiva; Virgin EMI
- Songwriters: Edward Drewett; Guy Robin; Samuel Roman
- Producer: Jonas Blue

Jonas Blue singles chronology
"Alien" (2018)	"Rise" (2018)	"I See Love" (2018)

Jack & Jack singles chronology
"Stay with Me" (2018)	"Rise" (2018)	"No One Compares to You" (2018)

Iz*One singles chronology
"Suki to Iwasetai" (2019)	"Rise" (2019)	"Violeta" (2019)

Music video
- "Rise" on YouTube

"Rise" is a song by British DJ and record producer Jonas Blue featuring American pop-rap duo Jack & Jack. It was released on 25 May 2018 by Positiva Records and Virgin EMI Records.

The song has peaked at number three on the UK Singles Chart, becoming Blue's fourth UK top 10 hit. It is the sixth single of Blue's debut album Blue. The song is also included on Jack & Jack's debut studio album, A Good Friend Is Nice.

A version featuring a subunit of Korean–Japanese girl group Iz*One, consisting of the half of group's members Choi Ye-na, Lee Chae-yeon, Kim Chae-won, Jo Yu-ri, An Yu-jin and Jang Won-young, was released on 9 March 2019.

== Background ==
Blue first reached out to Jack & Jack after hearing them performing on a Los Angeles radio station.

== Music video ==
The official music video was uploaded to YouTube on 15 June 2018 and was filmed in Lisbon, Portugal. The first section of the video was filmed in the Alfama district of Lisbon. The second part was recorded in the Terreiro dos Radicais Skate Park, near the Ponte Vasco da Gama bridge. The video received a "British Artist Video of the Year" nomination at the 2019 Brit Awards.

== Track listings ==
Digital download
No.	Title	Length
1.	"Rise" (featuring Jack & Jack)	3:13

Digital download – club mix
No.	Title	Length
1.	"Rise" (featuring Jack & Jack) (Jonas Blue & Eden Prince club mix)	4:26

Digital download – acoustic
No.	Title	Length
1.	"Rise" (with Jack & Jack) (acoustic)	3:52

Digital download – remixes
No.	Title	Length
1.	"Rise" (with Jack & Jack) (TV Noise Ibiza mix)	3:39
2.	"Rise" (with Jack & Jack) (Blanke remix)	3:37

Digital download – remixes, part 2
No.	Title	Length
1.	"Rise" (with Jack & Jack) (Retrovision mix)	3:10
2.	"Rise" (with Jack & Jack) (Dark Heart remix)	3:28

CD single
No.	Title	Length
1.	"Rise" (featuring Jack & Jack) (original version)	3:13
2.	"Rise" (featuring Jack & Jack) (Jonas Blue & Eden Prince club mix)	4:26

Digital download (featuring Iz*One) – single
No.	Title	Length
1.	"Rise" (featuring Iz*One)	3:12

== Charts ==
=== Weekly charts ===
Weekly chart performance for "Rise"
Chart (2018–19)	Peak position
Australia (ARIA)	7
Austria (Ö3 Austria Top 40)	2
Belgium (Ultratop 50 Flanders)	5
Belgium (Ultratop 50 Wallonia)	9
Canada (Canadian Hot 100)	39
Croatia Airplay (HRT)	5
Czech Republic (Rádio – Top 100)	1
Czech Republic (Singles Digitál Top 100)	3
Denmark (Tracklisten)	20
France (SNEP)	29
Germany (GfK)	8
Hungary (Dance Top 40)	30
Hungary (Rádiós Top 40)	2
Hungary (Single Top 40)	12
Hungary (Stream Top 40)	3
Ireland (IRMA)	3
Italy (FIMI)	54
Japan (Japan Hot 100) (Billboard)	44
Mexico Airplay (Billboard)	31
Netherlands (Dutch Top 40)	3
Netherlands (Single Top 100)	9
New Zealand (Recorded Music NZ)	13
Norway (VG-lista)	10
Poland (Polish Airplay Top 100)	7
Portugal (AFP)	11
Romania (Airplay 100)	11
Scotland Singles (OCC)	2
Singapore (RIAS)	5
Slovakia (Rádio Top 100)	2
Slovakia (Singles Digitál Top 100)	4
Slovenia (SloTop50)	3
Spain (PROMUSICAE)	60
Sweden (Sverigetopplistan)	14
Switzerland (Schweizer Hitparade)	10
UK Singles (OCC)	3
Ukraine Airplay (Tophit)	80
US Bubbling Under Hot 100 (Billboard)	9
US Dance Club Songs (Billboard)	1
US Hot Dance/Electronic Songs (Billboard)	9
US Pop Airplay (Billboard)	37

=== Year-end charts ===
2018 year-end chart performance for "Rise"
Chart (2018)	Position
Australia (ARIA)	29
Austria (Ö3 Austria Top 40)	9
Belgium (Ultratop Flanders)	27
Belgium (Ultratop Wallonia)	39
Denmark (Tracklisten)	80
France (SNEP)	115
Germany (Official German Charts)	29
Hungary (Rádiós Top 40)	54
Hungary (Single Top 40)	87
Iceland (Plötutíóindi)	49
Ireland (IRMA)	22
Netherlands (Dutch Top 40)	8
Netherlands (Single Top 100)	17
Poland (ZPAV)	36
Portugal (AFP)	47
Romania (Airplay 100)	64
Sweden (Sverigetopplistan)	51
Switzerland (Schweizer Hitparade)	29
UK Singles (Official Charts Company)	41
US Dance Club Songs (Billboard)	17
US Hot Dance/Electronic Songs (Billboard)	18

2019 year-end chart performance for "Rise"
Chart (2019)	Position
Hungary (Dance Top 40)	91
Hungary (Rádiós Top 40)	13
Portugal (AFP)	142

== Certifications ==
Certifications and sales for "Rise"
Region	Certification	Certified units/sales
Australia (ARIA)	6× Platinum	420,000^{‡}
Belgium (BRMA)	Platinum	40,000^{‡}
Brazil (Pro-Música Brasil)	Diamond	160,000^{‡}
Canada (Music Canada)	Platinum	80,000^{‡}
Denmark (IFPI Danmark)	Platinum	90,000^{‡}
France (SNEP)	Platinum	200,000^{‡}
Germany (BVMI)	Platinum	400,000^{‡}
Italy (FIMI)	Platinum	50,000^{‡}
Mexico (AMPROFON)	Gold	30,000^{‡}
Netherlands (NVPI)	Platinum	80,000^{‡}
New Zealand (RMNZ)	3× Platinum	90,000^{‡}
Poland (ZPAV)	4× Platinum	200,000^{‡}
Portugal (AFP)	2× Platinum	20,000^{‡}
Spain (PROMUSICAE)	Platinum	60,000^{‡}
United Kingdom (BPI)	2× Platinum	1,200,000^{‡}
United States (RIAA)	Gold	500,000^{‡}
Streaming
Japan (RIAJ)	Gold	50,000,000^{†}
Sweden (GLF)	2× Platinum	16,000,000^{†}
^{‡} Sales+streaming figures based on certification alone.^{†} Streaming-only figures based on certification alone.

== Release history ==
Release dates for "Rise"
Region	Date	Format	Label	Ref.
Various	25 May 2018	Digital download; streaming	Positiva; Virgin EMI	
United States	3 July 2018	Contemporary hit radio	Capitol	
Germany	3 August 2018	CD single	Virgin EMI	
