= Mama (Jonas Blue song) =

- Animated single cover

Single by Jonas Blue featuring William Singe

from the album Blue
- Released: 5 May 2017
- Genre: Tropical house
- Length: 3:04
- Label: Jonas Blue Music
- Songwriters: Guy James Robin; Ed Drewett; Sam Roman
- Producer: Jonas Blue

Jonas Blue singles chronology
"By Your Side" (2016)	"Mama" (2017)	"We Could Go Back" (2017)

William Singe singles chronology
"Rush" (2017)	"Mama" (2017)	"Please" (2018)

Music video
- "Mama" on YouTube

"Mama" is a song by British DJ and record producer Jonas Blue featuring vocals from Māori singer William Singe. It was released by Jonas Blue Music on 5 May 2017 as the fourth single from Blue's album, Blue. "Mama" was written by Ed Drewett, Romans and Blue, who also produced the song. The song was highly successful, reaching the top 10 in at least 20 countries.

== Background and composition ==
Regarding the song, Blue said "'Mama' is a song about that period of your life when you're young and carefree, without stress, bills and problems and all you care about is having a good time with your friends every day and night!" The video had in appearance, Albanian model, Oriola Marashi.

"Mama" is performed in the key of B minor with a tempo of 104 beats per minute in common time, with Singe's vocals ranging from B_{3} to B_{5}.

== Track listing ==
Digital download
No.	Title	Length
1.	"Mama" (featuring William Singe)	3:04

Digital download – Extended Mix
No.	Title	Length
1.	"Mama" (featuring William Singe)	3:04
2.	"Mama" (featuring William Singe (Extended Mix))	4:28

Digital download – Remixes EP
No.	Title	Length
1.	"Mama" (featuring William Singe) (Club Mix)	4:29
2.	"Mama" (featuring William Singe) (Syn Cole Remix)	2:59
3.	"Mama" (featuring William Singe) (Dzeko Remix)	2:57
4.	"Mama" (featuring William Singe) (Perplexus Remix)	3:24
5.	"Mama" (featuring William Singe) (Pola & Bryson Remix)	3:48

== Charts ==
=== Weekly charts ===
Chart (2017–18)	Peak position
Australia (ARIA)	7
Austria (Ö3 Austria Top 40)	5
Belgium (Ultratop 50 Flanders)	2
Belgium (Ultratop 50 Wallonia)	7
Bulgaria Airplay (PROPHON)	5
Bolivia Airplay (Monitor Latino)	4
Canada Hot 100 (Billboard)	45
Colombia Airplay (National-Report)	52
Croatia International Airplay (Top lista)	40
Czech Republic Airplay (ČNS IFPI)	7
Czech Republic Singles Digital (ČNS IFPI)	4
Denmark (Tracklisten)	5
Ecuador Airplay (National-Report)	26
Finland (Suomen virallinen lista)	14
France (SNEP)	16
Germany (GfK)	5
Hungary (Dance Top 40)	29
Hungary (Rádiós Top 40)	6
Hungary (Single Top 40)	26
Hungary (Stream Top 40)	5
Ireland (IRMA)	4
Italy (FIMI)	34
Lebanon (Lebanese Top 20)	13
Malaysia (RIM)	8
Mexico Airplay (Billboard)	44
Netherlands (Dutch Top 40)	1
Netherlands (Mega Top 50)	2
Netherlands (Single Top 100)	5
New Zealand (Recorded Music NZ)	8
Norway (VG-lista)	9
Philippines (Philippine Hot 100)	13
Poland Airplay (ZPAV)	9
Portugal (AFP)	8
Romania (Airplay 100)	62
Russia Airplay (Tophit)	8
Scottish Singles Sales (Official Charts)	3
Serbia Airplay (Radiomonitor)	3
Slovakia Airplay (ČNS IFPI)	4
Slovakia Singles Digital (ČNS IFPI)	5
Slovenia Airplay (SloTop50)	6
Spain (Promusicae)	26
Sweden (Sverigetopplistan)	6
Switzerland (Schweizer Hitparade)	6
UK Singles (Official Charts)	4
US Bubbling Under Hot 100 (Billboard)	1
US Dance Club Songs (Billboard)	9
US Hot Dance/Electronic Songs (Billboard)	10
US Pop Airplay (Billboard)	32

=== Year-end charts ===
Chart (2017)	Position
Australia (ARIA)	26
Austria (Ö3 Austria Top 40)	18
Belgium (Ultratop Flanders)	9
Belgium (Ultratop Wallonia)	37
Denmark (Tracklisten)	19
France (SNEP)	71
Germany (Official German Charts)	16
Hungary (Dance Top 40)	83
Hungary (Rádiós Top 40)	49
Hungary (Single Top 40)	86
Hungary (Stream Top 40)	15
Italy (FIMI)	79
Latvia Airplay (LaIPA)	45
Netherlands (Dutch Top 40)	4
Netherlands (Single Top 100)	20
New Zealand (Recorded Music NZ)	46
Poland Airplay (ZPAV)	56
Portugal (AFP)	31
Slovenia Airplay (SloTop50)	38
Spain (PROMUSICAE)	84
Sweden (Sverigetopplistan)	25
Switzerland (Schweizer Hitparade)	33
UK Singles (Official Charts Company)	14
US Hot Dance/Electronic Songs (Billboard)	23

Chart (2018)	Position
Iceland (Plötutíóindi)	89
Portugal (AFP)	170

== Certifications ==
Region	Certification	Certified units/sales
Australia (ARIA)	6× Platinum	420,000^{‡}
Austria (IFPI Austria)	Gold	15,000^{‡}
Belgium (BRMA)	2× Platinum	40,000^{‡}
Brazil (Pro-Música Brasil)	3× Platinum	180,000^{‡}
Canada (Music Canada)	Platinum	80,000^{‡}
Denmark (IFPI Danmark)	3× Platinum	270,000^{‡}
France (SNEP)	Diamond	333,333^{‡}
Germany (BVMI)	2× Platinum	800,000^{‡}
Italy (FIMI)	2× Platinum	100,000^{‡}
Mexico (AMPROFON)	Gold	30,000^{‡}
Netherlands (NVPI)	2× Platinum	80,000^{‡}
New Zealand (RMNZ)	3× Platinum	90,000^{‡}
Poland (ZPAV)	3× Platinum	150,000^{‡}
Portugal (AFP)	2× Platinum	20,000^{‡}
Spain (Promusicae)	Platinum	40,000^{‡}
Sweden (GLF)	2× Platinum	80,000^{‡}
United Kingdom (BPI)	2× Platinum	1,200,000^{‡}
United States (RIAA)	Gold	500,000^{‡}
Streaming
Japan (RIAJ)	Gold	50,000,000^{†}
^{‡} Sales+streaming figures based on certification alone.^{†} Streaming-only figures based on certification alone.

== Release history ==
Region	Date	Format	Label	Ref.
Various	5 May 2017	Digital download	Jonas Blue Music	
United States	11 July 2017	Contemporary hit radio	Capitol	
Various	21 July 2017	Digital download (Remixes)	Jonas Blue Music	
