= Jonas Blue =

English DJ and producer (born 1989)

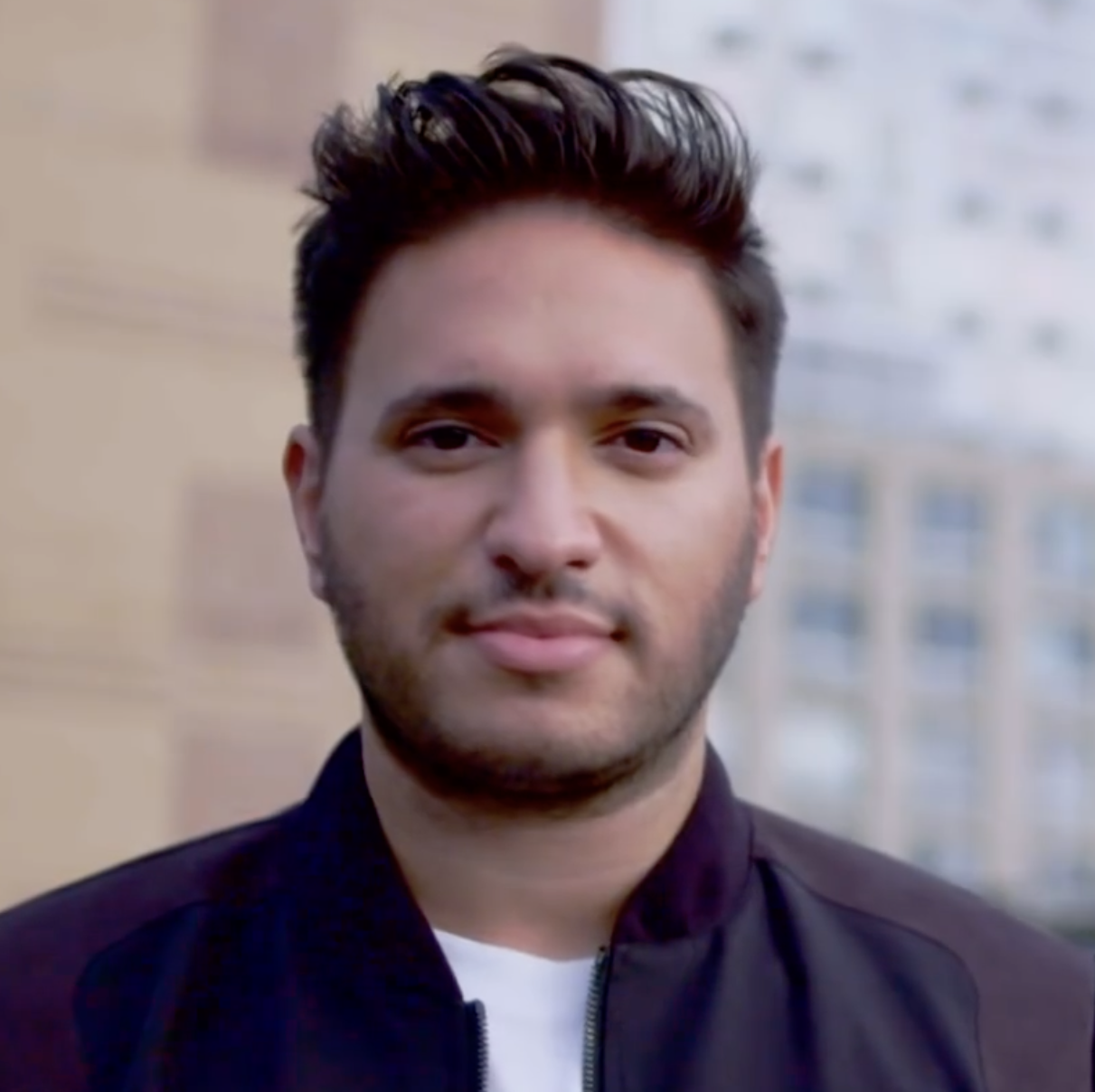
- Blue in 2018

Background information
- Born: Guy James Robin; 2 August 1989 (age 36); Essex, England
- Origin: London, England
- Genres: Dance-pop, tropical house, EDM
- Occupations: DJ; record producer; remixer
- Years active: 2009–present
- Labels: Capitol; Positiva; Virgin EMI; Electronic Nature
- Website: jonasblue.com

Guy James Robin (born 2 August 1989), known professionally as Jonas Blue, is an English DJ, record producer and remixer, who produces music which blends dance with pop sensibilities.

== Career ==
=== 2015–2017: Breakthrough and Jonas Blue: Electronic Nature – The Mix 2017 ===
In 2015, Blue released a tropical house cover of Tracy Chapman's 1988 single "Fast Car". It was his debut single and features vocals from Dakota. The Blue version peaked at number two on the UK Singles Chart, behind Zayn Malik's "Pillowtalk". Its UK peak meant it charted higher than Chapman's original, which peaked at number five on the chart in May 1988 and a position higher upon a re-release in April 2011. It also remained in the top 10 for 11 weeks.

The Jonas Blue version also reached number one in Germany, Sweden, Australia and New Zealand, as well as reaching the number one spot on the US viral chart on Spotify. The single has been certified platinum in Italy and the UK, 2× platinum in New Zealand and 3× platinum in Australia. The track has been streamed over 1 billion times on Spotify, and has achieved over 310 million views on Vevo.

On 3 June 2016, he released a new single titled "Perfect Strangers", featuring JP Cooper on Virgin EMI Records. It peaked at No. 2 on the UK Singles Chart. To date, the song has been certified platinum in the UK, double platinum in Australia and gold in New Zealand. The track led to Blue reaching one billion streams across his tracks and videos. In October 2016 his third single titled "By Your Side" was released, featuring British singer Raye, again on Virgin EMI Records. It peaked at No. 15 on the UK Singles Chart.

On 5 May 2017, he released the song "Mama", featuring Australian singer William Singe which charted at No. 4 on the UK Singles Chart. On 14 July 2017, Blue released the compilation album called "Jonas Blue: Electronic Nature - The Mix 2017".

=== 2017–2019: Blue ===
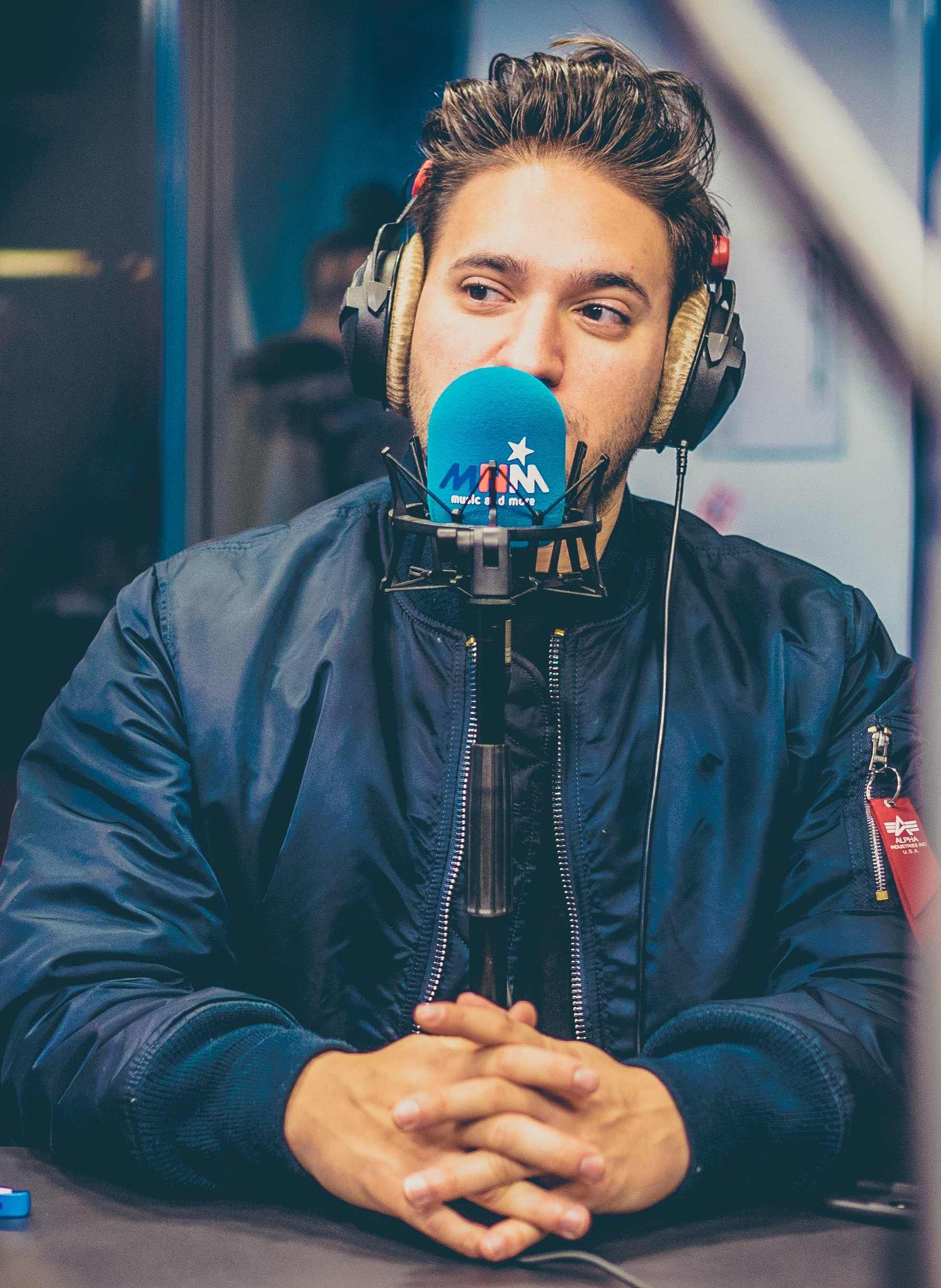
Jonas on the radio in 2018

On 14 September 2017, Jonas Blue produced the song "Heartline" sung by Craig David for his album The Time is Now. It reached No. 24 on the UK Singles Chart. On 13 October 2017, the single "We Could Go Back" was released, featuring Moelogo. It charted at No. 74 on the UK Singles Chart.

On 5 January 2018, Blue released "Hearts Ain't Gonna Lie", with Arlissa. On 16 March 2018, he released the single "Alien" with Sabrina Carpenter. On 25 May 2018, he released "Rise" featuring Jack & Jack. It charted at No. 3 on the UK Singles Chart. He released another version of "Rise" with the south Korean girl group IZ*ONE. He released "I See Love" featuring Joe Jonas on 29 June 2018, which appears on the Hotel Transylvania 3 soundtrack as well as Blue's debut album. American DJ MK released a song titled "Back & Forth" with Blue and English singer-songwriter Becky Hill. It charted at No. 12 in the UK. Bantu released "Roll with Me" with Blue featuring Shungudzo and ZieZie on 21 September 2018.

On 5 October 2018, Blue released "Polaroid" with English singer Liam Payne and Canadian singer Lennon Stella as the eighth single from the debut studio album Blue. The song charted at No. 12 on the UK Singles Chart. His debut album, Blue, was released on 9 November 2018. It was also confirmed that he would be the executive producer of British girl group Four of Diamonds' debut album. On 30 November 2018, Blue produced the song "Blind" sung by Four of Diamonds for their upcoming album.

"Desperate" featuring Nina Nesbitt was released as the ninth single from Blue's debut album on 23 January 2019. "Wild" featuring Chelcee Grimes, TINI and Jhay Cortez was released as the tenth and final single from the album on 27 February 2019.

=== 2019–2020: Est. 1989 ===
On 22 March 2019, Blue released "What I Like About You" featuring Theresa Rex. It peaked at No. 16 on the UK Singles Chart. On 31 May 2019, Dutch DJ Tiësto released the song "Ritual" with Blue and British singer Rita Ora, which peaked at No. 24 on the UK Singles Chart. On 19 July 2019, Blue released the song "I Wanna Dance", followed by the song "Younger" with English singer Hrvy on 6 September 2019.

On 19 November 2020, Blue co-produced the song "My Head & My Heart" for Ava Max from her album Heaven & Hell, which reached the top 20 of the UK Singles Chart.

=== 2021–present: Endless Summer and Together ===
On 5 February 2021, Jonas Blue released the song "Something Stupid" with Awa. On 28 May 2021, Jonas Blue released the song "Hear Me Say" with Léon. The song debuted on the UK Singles Chart at No.65. He shared that the music video was meant to "capture escapism and wanderlust" while sharing positivity in a time when the COVID-19 pandemic limited travel. He also admitted the song "hits emotionally" and expressed pride at fans' reception of the track.

On 10 September 2021, Blue collaborated with R3hab featuring Ava Max and Kylie Cantrall on the song "Sad Boy". On 7 January 2022, Blue released the song "Don't Wake Me Up" with Why Don't We, he released the Japanese version of " Don't Wake me Up " with BE:FIRST on 13 July 2022. On 25 March 2022, he released the song "Angles" with Sevenn. On 8 April 2022, Blue released the song "Siento". On 6 May 2022, Blue and Sam Feldt released the song "Til The End" and "Rest of My Life" under the project Endless Summer with Sam Derosa. On 27 May 2022, Blue collaborated with Julian Perretta on the song "Perfect Melody". On 2 September 2022, Blue and Louisa Johnson released the song "Always Be There".

== Discography ==
- Blue (2018)

Japanese releases

- Est. 1989 (2020)
- Together (2024)

== Awards and nominations ==
Year	Award	Work	Category	Result
2016	MTV Europe Music Awards	Himself	Best Push Act	Nominated
2017	Brit Awards	"Fast Car"	British Single of the Year	Nominated
2017	Brit Awards	"Fast Car"	British Video of the Year	Eliminated
2018	Brit Awards	"Mama"	British Single of the Year	Nominated
2018	Brit Awards	"Mama"	British Video of the Year	Eliminated
2019	Brit Awards	"Rise"	British Video of the Year	Eliminated

== See also ==
- List of Australian chart achievements and milestones
- 2016 in British music charts
