= Positiva Records =

British record label

- Parent company: Universal Music Group; Previously: Thorn EMI (1993–1996); EMI (1996–2012); Warner Music Group (2013-present; Back Catalogue)
- Founded: 1993; 33 years ago
- Founder: Nick Halkes
- Distributors: EMI Records (in the UK); Island Records (in the US); Universal Music Group (international)
- Genre: Dance
- Location: United Kingdom

Positiva Records is a subsidiary of Universal Music Group and concentrates on releasing dance music in the UK. The record label was set up in 1993, by Nick Halkes, who previously ran XL Recordings. Its headquarters are at the Universal UK offices (formerly at EMI offices in Brook Green in West London), where it is the only large dance music label under the EMI banner.

== History ==
One of the label's first releases was "I Like to Move It" by Reel 2 Real, an alias of dance DJ Erick Morillo, originally released on Strictly Rhythm. Later, the label signed US vocalist Barbara Tucker, who went on to release tracks including "Beautiful People" and "Stay Together" (both 1995) and "Stop Playing with My Mind" (2000). Other house releases in this period came from Umboza, the Bucketheads and Judy Cheeks. During the late 1990s, Positiva released several tracks from the emerging trance scene such as Alice Deejay's "Better Off Alone" which became a huge hit in Europe and the U.S., as well as DJ Quicksilver's "Bellissima", Ayla's eponymously titled "Ayla", Binary Finary's "1998" and BBE's "Seven Days and One Week".

Releases in the 2000s have included the number one hits "Toca's Miracle" by Coco Star vs Fragma, "Groovejet (If This Ain't Love)" by Spiller featuring Sophie Ellis-Bextor, and "Lola's Theme" by the Shapeshifters. Other top 10 hits in the same decade include Watergate's "Heart of Asia", "Flashdance" by Deep Dish, Motorcycle's "As the Rush Comes", remixes of The Source feat. Candi Staton's "You Got the Love" and "Watch the Sunrise" by Swedish DJ/producer Axwell.

Other artists who have been with the label for many years include Paul van Dyk and the Shapeshifters, although the latter have since left to release tracks via Defected Records and concentrate on running their own Nocturnal Grooves label.

The label has since been resurrected by Universal Music Group as a trading name for Virgin Records and releases from foreign dance acts, such as Armin van Buuren, Avicii, Nicky Romero and Nervo.

== Releases ==
List of singles, EPs and studio albums, with selected chart positions and certifications
Cat ref.	Artist	Title	Year	UK Chart Position (OCC)
TIV1	Exoterix	Void – Single	1993	58
TIV2	The Disco Evangelists	De Niro – Single	1993	59
TIV3	Hyper Go-Go	Never Let Go – Single	1993	45
TIV4	Wall of Sound feat Gerald Lethan	Critical (If You Only Knew) – Single	1993	73
TIV5	D-Tek	Drop The Rock – EP	1993	70
TIV6	Judy Cheeks	So in Love (The Real Deal) – Single	1993	27
TIV7	The Disco Evangelists	A New Dawn (Back to the World) – Single	1993	
TIV8	Diddy	Give Me Love – Single	1994	52
TIV9	Hyper Go-Go	Raise – Single	1994	36
TIV10	Reel 2 Reel feat The Mad Stuntman	I Like To Move It – Single	1994	5
TIV11	Barbara Tucker	Beautiful People – Single	1994	23
TIV12	Judy Cheeks	Reach – Single	1994	17
TIV13	Pan Position	Elephant Paw (Get Down to the Funk – Single)	1994	55
TIV14	Eddy	Someday – Single	1994	49
TIV15	Reel 2 Reel feat The Mad Stuntman	Go on Move – Single	1994	7
TIV16	Amos	Only Saw Today/ Instant Karma – Single	1994	48
TIV17	The Whooliganz	Put Your Handz Up – Single	1994	53
TIV18	2 in a Room	El Trago (The Drink) – Single	1994	34
TIV19	Mozaic	Nothing in the World – Single	1994	92
TIV20	Hyper Go-Go	It's Alright – Single	1994	49
TIV21	The Purple Kings	That's The Way You Do It – Single	1994	26
TIV22	Reel 2 Reel feat The Mad Stuntman	Can You Feel It? – Single	1994	13
TIV23	Barbara Tucker	I Get Lifted – Single	1994	33
TIV24	Amos	Let Love Shine – Single	1995	31
TIV25	X-Static	I'm Standing (Higher) – Single	1995	41
TIV26	Kadoc	The Nighttrain – Single	1996	14
TIV27	Reel 2 Reel feat The Mad Stuntman	Raise Your Hand – Singles	1995	14
TIV28	Judy Cheeks	Respect – Single	1995	23
TIV29	Eddy	(You Bring Out) The Best in Me – Single	1995	81
TIV30	Reel 2 Reel	Conway – Single	1995	27
TIV31	The Whooliganz	Whooliganz – Single	1995	95
TIV32	2 in a Room	Ahora Es (Now Is The Time) – Single	1995	43
TIV33	Kenny "Dope" pres The Bucketheads	The Bomb! (These Sounds Fall into My Mind) – Single	1995	5
TIV34	Judy Cheeks	As Long As You're Good To Me/ You're The Story of My Life – Single	1995	30
TIV35	X-Static	Move on Up – Single	1995	Shelved
TIV36	Joe T. Vannelli Project	Sweetest Day of May – Single	1995	45
TIV37	Junior Vasquez	Get Your Hands Off My Man! – Single	1995	22
TIV38	Amos	Church of Freedom – Single	1995	54
TIV39	Barbara Tucker	Stay Together – Single	1995	46
TIV40	The Ragga Twins	Freedom Train – Single	1995	107
TIV41	B B Club	Play This House – Single	1995	78
TIV42	Judy Cheeks	Reach (Reissue)	1996	22
TIV43	Umboza	Cry India – Single	1995	19
TIV44	Kenny "Dope" pres The Bucketheads	The Dungeon Tapes, The Story So Far – Single	1995	
TIV45	The Ragga Twins	Money – Single	1995	Did Not Chart
TIV46	Ruffneck feat Yavahn	Everybody Be Somebody – Single	1995	13
TIV47	Umboza	Sunshine – Single	1996	14
TIV48	Kenny "Dope" pres The Bucketheads	Got Myself Together – Single	1996	12
TIV49	Transformer 2	Just Can't Get Enough – Single	1996	45
TIV50	Nylon Moon	Sky Plus – Single	1996	43
TIV51	Black Magic	Freedom (Make It Funky) – Single	1996	41
TIV52	Judge Jules & John Kelly pres Stix 'N' Stoned – Single	Outrageous	1996	39
TIV53	The Beat Syndicate	Throw The Madness – Single	1996	78
TIV54	Michelle	Standing Here All Alone – Single	1996	69
TIV55	Scot Project	U (I Got A Feeling) – Single	1996	66
TIV56	Reel 2 Reel	Are You Ready For Some More? – Single	1996	24
TIV57	The Lisa Marie Experience	Do That To Me – Single	1996	33
TIV58	Kadoc	You Got To Be There – Single	1996	45
TIV59	Reel 2 Reel	Jazz It Up – Single	1996	7
TIV60	Konya	Come On – Single	1996	123
TIV61	Ruffneck feat Yavahn	Move Your Body – Single	1996	60
TIV62	George Morel feat Heather Wildman	Let's Groove – Single	1996	42
TIV63	Dino Lenny	White Horses – Single	1996	Did Not Chart
TIV64	Outrage	Tall 'N' Handsome – Single	1996	51
TIV65	Jeremy Healy & Amos	Stamp! – Single	1996	11
TIV66	Express of Sound	Real Vibration (Want Love) – Single	1996	45
TIV67	B.B.E.	Seven Days And One Week – Single	1996	3
TIV68	Baby Doc	La Batteria (The Drum Track) – Single	1996	90
TIV69	Umboza	Paradiso – Single	1996	Promo Only
TIV70	Reel 2 Reel	Move Your Body (Mueve La Cadera) – Single	1996	Did Not Chart
TIV71	Qattara	Come With Me – Single	1997	31
TIV72	DJ Quicksilver	Bellissima – Single	1997	4
TIV73	B.B.E.	Flash – Single	1997	5
TIV74	Jeremy Healy & Amos	Argentina – Single	1997	30
TIV75	Natural Born Grooves	Groovebird – Single	1997	21
TIV76	Brainbug	Nightmare – Single	1997	11
TIV77	DJ Quicksilver	Free – Single	1997	7
TIV78	B-Crew feat. Barbara Tucker, Ultra Nate and Dajae Moné	Partay Feeling – Single	1997	45
TIV79	Boris Dlugosch pres Booom	Holding Your Head up High – Single	1997	23
TIV80	Hypertrophy	Just Come Back 2 Me – Single	1997	
TIV81	Coco	I Need A Miracle – Single	1997	39
TIV82	Qattara	The Truth – Single	1997	Did Not Chart
TIV83	Laguna	Spiller From Rio (Do It Easy) – Single	1997	40
TIV84	PF Project feat. Ewan McGregor	Choose Life – Single	1997	6
TIV85	Gant	Sound Bwoy Burial/ All Night Lonbg – Single	1997	67
TIV86	Brainbug	Benedictus/ Nightmare – Single	1997	24
TIV87	B.B.E.	Desire – Single	1997	19
TIV88	DJ Quicksilver	Planet Love – Single	1998	12
TIV89	A vs B	Ripped in 2 Minutes – Single	1998	49
TIV90	Perpetual Motion	Keep on Dancin' (Let's Go) – Single	1998	12
TIV91	Groovezone	Eisbaer – Single	1998	85
TIV92				
TIV93	B.B.E.	Deeper Love (Symphonic Paradise) – Single	1998	19
TIV94	Storm	Storm – Single	1998	32
TIV95	Brainbug	Rain – Single	1998	Promo Only
TIV96	Barbara Tucker	Everybody Dance (The Horn Song) – Single	1998	28
TIV97	Spiller	Batucada – Single	1998	Promo Only
TIV98	Binary Finary	1998 – Single	1998	24
TIV99	Skinky Pink	Last Train To Kings Cross – Single	1998	
TIV100	Diva Surprise feat Georgina Jones	On Top of the World – Single	1998	28
TIV101	DJ Quicksilver	Timerider – Single	1998	Promo Only
TIV102	Ayla	Ayla – Single	1998	Shelved^{[A]}
TIV103	Babe Instinct	Disco Babes From Outer Space – Single	1999	21
TIV104	Marc et Claude	La – Single	1998	28
TIV105	Vengaboys	Up And Down – Single	1998	4
TIV106	Bucketheads	The Bomb! (These Sounds Fall into My Mind) (reissue)	1999	Shelved
TIV107	DJ Sakin & Friends	Protect Your Mind (For the Love of a Princess) – Single	1999	4
TIV108	Vengaboys	We Like To Party! (The Vengabus) – Single	1999	3
TIV109	A Very Good Friend of Mine feat Joy	Just Round – Single	1999	55
TIV110	Veracocha	Carte Blanche – Single	1999	22
TIV111	PF Project feat Roachford	Walk Away – Single	1999	Promo Only
TIV112	DJ Sakin & Friends	Nomansland (David's Song) – Single	1999	14
TIV113	DJ Jurgen pres Alice Deejay	Better Off Alone – Single	1999	2
TIV114	Vengaboys	Boom, Boom, Boom, Boom!! – Single	1999	1
TIV115	Marc et Claude	Ne/ La – Single	1999	Promo Only
TIV116	DJ Sakin & Friends	Stay – Single	1999	Shelved
TIV117	Ayla	Ayla (reissue)	1999	22
TIV118	Binary Finary	1999 – Single	1999	11
TIV119	Vengaboys	We're Going To Ibiza/ Paradise – Single	1999	1
TIV120	Fragma	Toca Me – Single	1999	11
TIV121	Alice Deejay	Back in My Life – Single	1999	4
TIV122	Vengaboys	Kiss (When The Sun Don't Shine) – Single	1999	3
TIV123	Perfect Phase	Horny Horns – Single	1999	21
TIV124	Aurora	Hear You Calling – Single	2000	17
TIV125	Wisdôme	Off The Wall (Enjoy Yourself) – Single	2000	33
TIV126	Vengaboys	Shalala Lala – Single	2000	5
TIV127	Barbara Tucker feat Darryl D'Bonneau	Stop Playing with My Mind – Single	2000	17
TIV128	Fragma	Toca's Miracle – Single	2000	1 removed for copyright infringement
TIV129	Watergate	Heart of Asia – Single	2000	3
TIV130	Perfect Phase pres Those 2	Get Wicked – Single	2000	Did Not Chart
TIV131	Lange feat The Morrighan	Follow Me – Single	2000	1^{[B]}
TIV132	Novy Vs Eniac	Pumpin – Single	2000	19
TIV133	DJ Sandy vs Housetrap	Overdrive – Single	2000	32
TIV134	Alice Deejay	Will I Ever – Single	2000	7
TIV135	Vengaboys	Uncle John From Jamaica – Single	2000	6
TIV136	Marc et Claude	I Need Your Lovin' (Like The Sunshine) – Single	2000	12
TIV137	Spiller feat Sophie Ellis-Bextor	Groovejet (If This Ain't Love) – Single	2000	1
TIV138	Tru Faith & Dub Conspiracy	Freak Like Me – Single	2000	12
TIV139	Aurora feat Naimee Coleman	Ordinary World – Single	2000	5
TIV140	Frisky	I Like The Way – Single	2000	Promo Only
TIV141	Inaya Day	Feel it – Single	2000	51
TIV142	Vengaboys feat. Cheekah	Cheekah Bow Bow (That Computer Song) – Single	2000	19
TIV143				
TIV144	Sarina Paris	Look at Us – Single	2000	Shelved and released later
TIV145	Alice Deejay	The Lonely One – Single	2000	16
TIV146	Storm	Storm – Single	2000	Shelved and released later
TIV147	Fragma	Everytime You Need Me – Single	2001	3
TIV148	Vengaboys	Forever As On – Singlee	2001	28
TIV149	Alice Deejay	Celebrate Our Love – Single	2001	17
TIV150	Hypetraxx	The Dark Side – Single	2000	Promo Only
TIV151	Marc et Claude	Loving You – Single	2001	115
TIV152	Simon	Free at Last – Single	2001	36
TIV153	Fragma	You Are Alive – Single	2001	4
TIV154	Storm	Storm – Single (Reissue)	2001	32
TIV155	Trisco	Musak – Single	2001	28
TIV156	Boris Dlugosch feat Roisin Murphy	Never Enough – Single	2001	16
TIV157	Dreamcatcher	I Don't Wanna Lose My Way – Single	2002	14
TIV158	Barthezz	On The Move – Single	2001	18
TIV159	Sarina Paris	Look at Us – Single	2001	Promo Only
TIV160	Aurora	Dreaming – Single	2002	24^{[C]}
TIV161	Infernal Machine	Realistic – Single	2001	Shelved
TIV162	[Love] Tattoo	Drop Some Drums – Single	2001	58
TIV163	Spiller	Cry Baby – EP	2001	Promo Only
TIV164	The Ones	Flawless – Single	2001	7
TIV165	Orinoko	Island – Single	2001	10^{[B]}
TIV166	Milk & Sugar Vs Joh Paul Young	Love Is in the Air – Single	2002	25
TIV167	Spiller	Cry Baby – Single	2002	40
TIV168	Barthezz	Infected – Single	2002	25
TIV169	Lasgo	Something – Single	2002	4
TIV170	Marc et Claude	Tremble – Single	2002	29
TIV171	Shy FX & T-Power	Shake Ur Body (Feat. Di)- Single	2002	7
TIV172	The Scumfrog Vs Bowie	Loving The Alien – Single	2002	41
TIV173	Ferry Corsten	Punk – Single	2002	29
TIV174	Souvernance	Havin' A Good Time – Single	2002	63
TIV175	Solid Sessions	Janeiro – Single	2002	47
TIV176	Lasgo	Alone – Single	2002	7
TIV177	Trisco	Ultra – Single	2002	
TIV178	Dreamcatcher	Twisted – Single	2002	
TIV179	Milk Inc	Walk on Water – Single	2002	10
TIV180	Sash!	Ganbareh – Single	2002	Promo Only
TIV181	DJ Sandy vs Housetrap	Overdrive – Single (reissue)	2002	2^{[B]}
TIV182	Lasgo	Pray – Single	2002	17
TIV183				
Not Found	Moony	Dove (I'll Be Loving You) – EP	2002	
TIV184	Milk Inc	Land of the Living – Single	2003	18
TIV185	Driftwood	Freeloader – Single	2003	32
TIV186	The Ones	Superstar – Single	2003	45
TIV187	Room 5 feat Oliver Cheatham	Make Luv – Single	2003	1
TIV188	Bhangra Knights Vs Husan	Husan – Single	2003	7
TIV189	Kid Crème feat Charlise Rockwood	Hypnotising – Single	2003	31
TIV190	Marc et Claude	Loving You '03 – Single	2003	37
TIV191	The Scumfrog	Music Revolution – Single	2003	46
TIV192	Paul van Dyk feat Hemstock & Jennings	Nothing But You – Single	2003	14
TIV193	Harry's Afro Hut	C'mon Lady – Single	2003	Did Not Chart
TIV194	Double Dee	Shining – Single	2003	58
TIV195	Amen! UK	Passion – Single	2003	40
TIV196	Paul van Dyk feat Vega 4	Time of Our Lives/ Connected – Single	2003	28
TIV197	Room 5 feat Oliver Cheatham	Music & You – Single	2003	38
TIV198	Jaydee	Plastic Dreams – Single	2004	35
TIV199	Despina Vandi	Gia	2004	63
TIV200	Brainbug	Nightmare (2004 Remixes) – EP	2004	63
TIV201	Mr on Vs Jungle Brothers	Breathe Don't Stop – Single	2004	21
TIV202	Ferry Corsten	Rock Your Body Rock – Single	2004	11
TIV203	Motorcycle	As The Rush Comes – Single	2004	11
TIV204	Paul van Dyk feat Second Sun	Crush – Single	2004	42
TIV205	Lasgo	Surrender – Single	2004	24
TIV206	Ferry Corsten	It's Time – Single	2004	51
TIV207	The Shapeshifters	Lola's Theme – Single	2004	1
TIV208				
TIV209	Scent	Up & Down – Single	2004	23
TIV210	Brad Carter	Morning Always Comes Too Soon – Single	2004	48
TIV211	Deep Dish	Flashdance – Single	2004	3
TIV212	Red Carpet	Alright – Single	2004	48
TIV213	Reflekt feat Delline Bass	Need to Feel Loved – Single	2005	14
TIV214	The Lovefreekz	Shine – Single	2005	6
TIV215	Ferry Corsten	Holding On – Single	2005	Promo Only
TIV216	Shapeshifters	Back To Basics – Single	2005	10
TIV217	Black Rock	Blue Water – Single	2005	36
TIV218	Poker Pets	Lovin' You – Single	2005	43
TIV219	M.V.P.	Roc Ya Body 'Mic Check 1.2' – Single	2005	5
TIV220	Deep Dish	Say Hello – Single	2005	14
TIV221	Paul van Dyk feat Wayne Jackson	The Other Side – Single	2005	58
TIV222	Lil' Love	Little Love – Single	2005	34
TIV223	Speedy feat Lumidee	Sientelo – Single	2005	104
TIV224	Olav Basoski	Waterman – Single	2005	45
TIV225	Rachael Starr	Till There Was You – Single	2005	Did Not Chart
TIV226	Jenn Cuneta	Come Rain Come Shine – Single	2005	80
TIV227	M.V.P.	Bounce, Shake, Move, Stop! – Single	2006	22
TIV228	Deep Dish feat Morel	Sacramento – EP	2005	Did Not Chart
TIV229	Ferry Corsten	Fire – Single	2006	40
TIV230	The Source	You Got The Love (feat. Candi Staton) – Single	2006	7
TIV231	Red Carpet	Alright – Single	2006	74
TIV232	Deep Dish	Dreams – Single	2006	14
TIV233	Shapeshifters	Incredible – Single	2006	12
TIV234	MYNC Project & Danny Rampling	Strobelight – Single	2006	Did Not Chart
TIV235				
TIV236	Soul Avengerz	Sing – EP	2006	89
TIV237	Teamsters feat Errol Reid	Feels Like Love – Single	2006	93
TIV238	Shapeshifts & Chic	Sensitivity – Single	2006	40
TIV239	Ferry Corsten	Watch Out – Single	2006	57
TIV240	KMC	Soul on Fire – Single	2006	Promo Only
TIV241	Chocolate Puma feat David Goncalves	Always And Forever – Single	2006	43
TIV242	Dario G	Ring of Fire – Single	2006	178^{[D]}
TIV243	Axwell feat Steve Edwards	Watch The Sunris – Singlee	2006	70
TIV244	Soul Avengerz feat Javine	Don't Let The Morning Come – Single	2006	49
TIV245	Sunfreakz feat Andrea Britton	Counting Down the Days – Single	2007	37
TIV246	Blondie Vs Edison	Heart of Glass – Single	2006	131
TIV247	Shapeshifters	If in Doubt Go Out – Single	2006	Promo Only
TIV248	Ferry Corsten feat Guru	Junk – Single	2006	122
TIV249	Soul Seekerz feat Kate Smith	Party for the Weeken – Singled	2006	Promo Only
TIV250	Queen Vs The Miami Project	Another One Bites The Dust – Single	2006	31
TIV251	Atrium	In Love With You – Single	2007	Did Not Chart
TIV252	Kathy Brown Vs Miami Calling	Dare Me – Single	2006	Promo Only
TIV253	Another Chance	Everytime I See Her (Sound of Eden) – Single	2007	62
TIV254	Audio Club	Sumthin Serious – Single	2007	Did Not Chart
TIV255	Therese	Feelin' Me	2007	61
TIV256	DJ Mike Cruz pres Inaya Day & Chyna Ro	Movin' On	2007	Shelved
TIV257	Soul Seekerz feat. Kate Smith	Party for the Weekend – Single	2007	Did Not Chart
TIV258	Shapeshifters	Pusher – Single	2007	56
TIV259	Paul van Dyk feat Jessica Sutta	White Lies – Single	2007	80
TIV260	Charlean Dance	MR DJ – Single	2007	51
TIV261	Axwell feat. Max'C	I Found U – Single	2007	6
TIV262	Shapeshifters	New Day – Single	2007	72
TIV263	Se:Sa feat Sharon Phillips	Like This Like That – Single	2007	63
TIV264	Filo & Peri feat Eric Lumiere	Anthem – Single	2007	39
TIV265	Che'Nelle Feat Cham	I Fell in Love with the DJ – Single	2007	Promo Only
TIV266	Paul van Dyk feat Rea Garvey	Let Go – Single	2007	Did Not Chart
TIV267	Mark Brown feat Sarah Cracknell	The Journey Continues – Single	2008	11
TIV268	Fragma	Toca's Miracle 2008 – Single	2008	16 removed for copyright infringement
TIV269	Che'Nelle	Hurry Up/ I Fell in Love with the DJ – Single	2007	Promo Only
TIV270	Jerry Ropero feat Cozi	The Storm – Single	2008	Did Not Chart
TIV271	Buy Now!	Body Crash – Single	2008	55
TIV272	Velvet	Fix Me – Single	2008	Promo Only
TIV273	James Doman	Everything's Gonna Be Alright – Single	2008	50
TIV274				
TIV275	Axwell & Bob Sinclair feat Ron Carroll	What A Wonderful World – Single	2008	48
TIV276				
TIV277	David Guetta & Chris Willis Vs Tocadisco	Tomorrow Can Wait – Single	2008	142
TIV278	The Shapeshifters	Lola's Theme (2008 Re-Edit)	2008	Did Not Chart
Not Found	Swingfly	Singing That Melody – Single	2008	
Not Found	Kleerup Feat. Marit Bergman	3am – Single	2008	
TIV279	David Guetta & Chris Willis With Steve Angello & Sebastian Ingrosso	Everytime We Touch	2009	68
TIV280				
TIV281	Doman & Gooding feat Dru & Lincoln	Runnin' – Single	2009	56
TIV282	Reflekt feat Delline Bass	Need To feel Loved (reissue) – Single	2009	188
TIV283	Kleerup feat Titiyo	Longing for Lullabies – Single	2009	Did Not Chart
TIV284				
TIV285	McLloyd	Tembisa Funk – Single	2009	Did Not Chart
TIV286				
TIV287	David Guetta feat Kelly Rowland	When Love Takes Over – Single	2009	1
TIV288	Alina	When You Leave (Numa Numa) – Single	2009	Promo Only
TIV289	Pitbull	I Know You Want Me (Calle Ocho) – Single	2009	4
TIV290				
TIV291				
TIV292				
TIV293				
TIV294	Gramophonedzie	Why Don't You – Single	2009	12 (Released later)
TIV295				
TIV296	David Guetta feat Estella	One Love – Single	2009	46
Not Found	Lonnie Gordon	Catch You Baby – Single	2009	
Not Found	Phonjaxx Ft. Cozi	Sensual – Single	2009	
Not Found	Velvet	Chemistry – Single	2009	
Not Found	Timmy Vegas & Bad Lay-Dee	Another Dimension – Single	2009	
TIV297				
TIV298	David Guetta & Chris Willis feat Fergie & LMFAO	Getting' Over You – Single	2010	1
TIV299				
TIV300	David Guetta featuring Rihanna	Who's That Chick? – Single	2010	6
Not Found	NERVO feat. Ollie James	Irresistible – Single	2010	
Not Found	DJ Sava feat Raluka	I Like The Trumpet – Single	2010	
Not Found	Billy The Kit feat. Stennis, Duvall & Bnann	Higher – Single	2011	
Not Found	David Guetta featuring Flo Rida and Nicki Minaj	Where Them Girls At – Single	2011	
Not Found	Alex Metric + Steve Angello	Open Your Eyes – Single	2011	89
Not Found	Alex Metric	Open Your Eyes (Remixes & Productions) – Album	2011	
Not Found	David Guetta	Nothing but the Beat – Album	2011	2
Not Found	David Guetta featuring Usher	Without You – Single	2011	6
Not Found	David Guetta featuring Sia	Titanium – Single	2011	1
Not Found	Swedish House Mafia	One (Your Name) (feat. Pharrell) – Single	2011	7
Not Found	NERVO	We're All No One (feat. Afrojack & Steve Aoki) – Single	2012	135
Not Found	David Guetta featuring Nicki Minaj	Turn Me On – Single	2011	8
Not Found	Arno Cost & Norman Doray	Strong – Single	2011	
Not Found	Vox Halo ft. LaDolla	Criminal – Single	2011	
Not Found	Sebjak	Follow Me – Single	2012	
Not Found	Sam Sparro	I Wish I Never Met You – Single	2012	
Not Found	Sam Sparro	Return to Paradise – Album	2012	
Not Found	David Guetta featuring Chris Brown and Lil Wayne	I Can Only Imagine – Single	2012	
Not Found	Patric la Funk & DJ Delicious	SMILE – Single	2012	
Not Found	NERVO	You're Gonna Love Again – Single	2012	89
Not Found	Mike Hawkins & Jay Colin	Shut the Place Down – Single	2012	
Not Found	Russ Chimes	Back 2 You – Single	2012	
Not Found	Wally Lopez feat. Kreesha Turner	Keep Running the Melody(The Japanese PopStars Remix) – Single	2012	Promo Only
Not Found	SEEKERSTARS	Non ci fermeremo mai (Figli delle stelle) – Single	2012	
Not Found	David Jimenez	Neon – Single	2012	
Not Found	Avicii vs Nicky Romero	I Could Be The One (Nicktim) – Single	2013	1
Not Found	Avicii	X You – Single	2013	47
Not Found	Nicky Romero & NERVO	Like Home – Single	2013	33
Not Found	Armin van Buuren	This Is What It Feels Like (feat. Trevor Guthrie) – Single	2013	6
Not Found	Avicii	Wake Me Up – Single	2013	1
Not Found	Armin van Buuren	Intense – Album	2013	37
Not Found	Armin van Buuren	Beautiful Life (feat. Cindy Alma) – Single	2013	Promo Only
Not Found	Wankelmut & Emma Louise	My Head Is A Jungle – Single	2013	5
Not Found	Martin Garrix	Animals – Single	2013	1
Not Found	Avicii	Hey Brother – Single	2013	2
Not Found	Armin van Buuren	Who's Afraid of 138?! – Single	2013	
Not Found	Cazzette	Run For Cover – Single	2013	
Not Found	Armin van Buuren	Save My Night – Single	2014	85
Not Found	Sick Individuals and Axwell	I AM (feat. Taylr Renee) – Single	2014	
Not Found	Martin Garrix & Jay Hardway	Wizard – Single	2014	1
Not Found	Deep Dish	Quincy – Single	2014	
Not Found	Avicii	True (Avicii by Avicii) – Album	2014	55
Not Found	Armin van Buuren	Ping Pong – Single	2014	
Not Found	Dimitri Vegas, Martin Garrix & Like Mike	Tremor (Sensation 2014 Anthem) – Single	2014	30
Not Found	Dada Life	Born To Rage – EP	2014	
Not Found	Avicii	Lay Me Down – Single(Reissue)	2014	
Not Found	GOLDHOUSE	FeelGood – EP	2014	
Not Found	Wankelmut & Emma Louise	My Head Is A Jungle (MK Remix) – Single(Reissue)	2014	
Not Found	Bingo Players	Knock You Out – Single	2014	
Not Found	Sander van Doorn, Martin Garrix, DVBBS ft. Aleesia	Gold Skies – Single	2014	49
Not Found	Various Artists	POSITIVA 21	2014	
Not Found	Avicii	The Nights – Single	2015	6
Not Found	Eelke Kleijn	Mistakes I've Made – Single	2015	
Not Found	L’Tric	This Feeling – Single	2015	
Not Found	Alex Adair	Make Me Feel Better – Single	2015	13
Not Found	Audien	Insomnia (feat. Parson James) – Single	2015	
Not Found	Kid Crème & Jolyon Petch	Look For Me – Single	2015	
Not Found	David Zowie	House Every Weekend – Single	2015	
Not Found	Avicii	Waiting For Love – Single	2015	6
Not Found	Martin Solveig & GTA	Intoxicated – Single	2015	5
Not Found	Avicii	Pure Grinding / For A Better Day – Single	2015	68 (For A Better Day)
Not Found	Hayden James	Something About You- Single	2015	
Not Found	Martin Solveig	+1 (feat. Sam White) – Single	2015	51
Not Found	Avicii	Stories – Album	2015	9
Not Found	Dada Life	One Last Night on Earth	2015	
TIV350	Oliver Heldens & Shaun Frank	Shades of Grey (feat. Delaney Jane) – Single	2015	
TIV353	Jonas Blue	Fast Car (feat. Dakota) – Single	2015	2
Not Found	MOGUAI	Hold On (feat. Cheat Codes) – Single	2016	Released later
Not Found	Audien	Daydreams – EP	2016	
Not Found	MÖWE & Daniel Nitt	Lovers Friends – Single	2016	Promo Only
Not Found	Audien	Something Better (feat. Lady Antebellum) – Single	2016	
Not Found	MOTi	Turn Me Up (feat. Nabiha) – Single	2016	Promo Only
Not Found	Martin Solveig	Do It Right (feat. Tkay Maidza) – Single	2016	97
Not Found	Jonas Blue	Perfect Strangers (feat. JP Cooper) – Single	2016	2
Not Found	Zash	Sweet Harmony – Single	2016	
Not Found	offaiah	Trouble – Single	2016	29
Not Found	Throttle	Money Maker (feat. Lunchmoney Lewis & Aston Merrygold) – Single	2016	
Not Found	Armin van Buuren feat. Trevor Guthrie	This Is What It Feels Like (Matt Lange Remix) – Single	2016	Promo Only
Not Found	Jonas Blue	By Your Side (feat. RAYE) – Single	2016	15
Not Found	Martin Solveig	Places (feat. Ina Wroldsen) – Single	2016	27
Not Found	KATO & Sigala	Show You Love (feat. Hailee Steinfeld) – Single	2017	91
Not Found	offaiah	Run – Single	2017	
Not Found	Tom & Collins	Mutual (feat. Whitney Phillips) – Single	2017	
TIV367	Jonas Blue	Mama (feat. William Singe) – Single	2017	4
Not Found	Jonas Blue	Electronic Nature Volume 1 – EP	2017	
Not Found	Audien x MAX	One More Weekend – Single	2017	
Not Found	Axwell & Ingrosso	More Than You Know – EP	2017	30
Not Found	KIKKR	You're Makin' Me High (feat. Ideh) – Single	2017	Release Later
Not Found	Jay Pryor	Teenage Crime – Single	2017	Promo Only
Not Found	Tujamo	One on One (feat. Sorana) – Single	2017	Promo Only
Not Found	Seeb & Greg Holden	Boys in the Street – Single	2017	
Not Found	Audien x 3LAU	Hot Water (feat. Victoria Zaro) – Single	2017	
Not Found	Martin Solveig	All Stars (feat. Alma) – Single	2017	
Not Found	Merk & Kremont	Sad Story (Out of Luck) – Single	2017	
Not Found	Hardwell & Austin Mahone	Creatures of the Night – Single	2017	
Not Found	offaiah	Run This Town (feat. Shenseea) – Single	2017	Release Later
Not Found	Kid Crème & Jolyon Petch	Boy in the Picture – Single	2017	
Not Found	Avicii	Avīci (01) – EP	2017	
Not Found	Burak Yeter x Ryan Riback	GO 2.0 – Single	2017	
Not Found	David Zowie	The Real Don – Single	2017	
Not Found	Jonas Blue	We Could Go Back (feat. Moelogo) – Single	2017	74
Not Found	Nick Talos	Glass House (feat. BullySongs) – Single	2017	
Not Found	Marnik	Burn (feat. Rookies) – Single	2017	
Not Found	Arlissa & Jonas Blue	Hearts Ain't Gonna Lie – Single	2018	
Not Found	ROOKIES	California – Single	2018	Release Later
Not Found	Oliver Nelson & Tobtok	99 Red Balloons (feat. River) – Single	2018	
Not Found	Gorgon City	Motorola – Single	2018	
Not Found	Tritonal	Out My Mind (feat. Riley Clemmons) – Single	2018	
Not Found	Tom & Collins	Only One (feat. Rachel West) – Single	2018	
Not Found	Jay Pryor	Rich Kid$ (feat. IDA) – Single	2018	
PTV2501	Scot Project	U (I Got a Feeling) [Eats Everything Reebeef] – Single	2018	
Not Found	CID, Bahary & The Flying Lizards	Money – Single	2018	
PTV2502	Motorcycle	As The Rush Comes (The 2018 Remixes) – EP	2018	Promo Only, Release Later
Not Found	Tiësto & Dzeko	Jackie Chan (feat. Preme & Post Malone) – Single	2018	5
PTV2503	The Disco Evangelists	De Niro (The Remixes) – EP	2018	Release Later for Side B
TIV384	Jonas Blue	Rise (feat. Jack & Jack) – Single	2018	3
Not Found	Polar Youth	All Night (feat. Georgie Allen) – Single	2018	
PTV2504	Reel 2 Reel feat The Mad Stuntman	Raise Your Hands (Shadow Child Update) – Single	2018	
Not Found	Jonas Blue	I See Love (feat. Joe Jonas) – Single	2018	
Not Found	Martin Solveig	My Love – Single	2018	
TIV388	Ten Ven	Just About – Single	2018	
Not Found	Purple Disco Machine	Dished (Male Stripper) – Single	2018	Release Later
Not Found	Young Romantic	Move (Time To Get Loose) – Single	2018	Release Later
Not Found	Marshmello	Happier (feat. Bastille) – Single	2018	2
PTV2505	George Morel	Let's Groove [Melé Mix] – Single	2018	
Not Found	Showtek & MOTi	Down Easy (feat. Starley & Wyclef Jean) – Single	2018	Release Later
PTV2506	B.B.E.	Seven Days And One Week (Yotto Remix) – Single	2018	
Not Found	Jonas Blue, Liam Payne & Lennon Stella	Polaroid – Single	2018	3
Not Found	Moon Willis	On Me (feat. Jenay Faith) – Single	2018	
Not Found	Jonas Blue	Blue – Album	2018	33
Not Found	Jay Pryor	Make Luv – Single	2018	
PTV2507	Barbara Tucker	Beautiful People (Floorplan Remix) – Single	2018	
Not Found	Brooks	Limbo (feat. Zoё Moss) – Single	2018	
Not Found	Seeb & Bastille	Grip – Single	2018	
TIV397	Arno Cost & Norman Doray	Together – Single	2019	
PTV2508	The Shapeshifters	Lola's Theme (Mella Dee Big Room Banger Mix) – EP	2019	
Not Found	Moon Willis	Trouble – Single	2019	
TIV400	Paul Woolford & Karen Harding	You Already Know – Single	2019	Release Later
Not Found	Jay Pryor	So What – Single	2019	
Not Found	Purple Disco Machine	Body Funk (2019 Edit) – Single	2019	Release Later
Not Found	Marshmello	Here With Me (feat. CHVRCHES) – Single	2019	9
Not Found	Josiah and the Bonnevilles	Swing (SDJM Remix) – Single	2019	Promo Only
Not Found	Jonas Blue	What I like About You (feat. Theresa Rex) – Single	2019	22
Not Found	Avicii	SOS (feat. Aloe Blacc) – Single	2019	6
PTV2509	Kenny "Dope" pres The Bucketheads	Got Myself Together (Ejeca Rework) – Single	2019	
Not Found	Syn Cole	Lights Go Down (feat. Dakota) – Single	2019	
Not Found	Marshmello	Light It Up (feat. Tyga & Chris Brown) – Single	2019	
Not Found	Wh0	Happy People (feat. Byron Stingily) – Single	2019	
Not Found	Jax Jones and Martin Solveig pres Europa	All Day and Night (with Madison Beer) – Single	2019	10 (Promo Only)
Not Found	Rafman	Wayside – Single	2019	
Not Found	R3HAB & Julie Bergan	Don't Give Up on Me Now – Single	2019	Promo Only
Not Found	Agoria	Remedy (feat. NOEMIE) (Remixes) – EP	2019	Promo Only, Release Later
Not Found	Moon Willis & Etta Bond	I Like The Way – Single	2019	
Not Found	Avicii	Tough Love (feat. Agnes, Vargas & Lagola) – Single	2019	60
Not Found	Ten Ven	Talk to Me – Single	2019	
Not Found	Tiësto, Jonas Blue & Rita Ora	Ritual – Single	2019	24
Not Found	Avicii	Tim – Album	2019	7
Not Found	Xpansions	Move Your Body (Elevation) [Remixes] – EP	2019	
Not Found	One Bit & Laura White	Back To You – Single	2019	
Not Found	Jonas Blue	I Wanna Dance – Single	2019	
Not Found	Purple Disco Machine	Emotions – EP	2019	
Not Found	Jay Pryor & Steve James	Finding Our Way – Single	2019	
Not Found	Jonas Blue & Hrvy	Younger – Single	2019	
Not Found	TCTS	Not Ready For Love (feat. Maya B) – Single	2019	
Not Found	ZHU, partywithray	Came for the Low – Single	2019	
Not Found	Jonas Blue & Retrovision	All Night Long – Single	2019	
Not Found	R3HAB, ZAYN & Jungleboi	Flames – Single	2019	
Not Found	Syn Cole	Mind Blown – Single	2019	
Not Found	Jay Pryor	By Now – Single	2019	
Not Found	Martin Solveig	Juliet & Romeo (feat. Roy Woods) – Single	2019	51
Not Found	Jonas Blue & Tifa Chen	Billboard – Single	2019	
Not Found	Topic	Breaking Me (feat. A7S) – Single	2019	3
Not Found	Daniel Blume	Nights Like This – Single	2020	
Not Found	R3HAB, Clara Mae, Frank Walker	More Than OK – Single	2020	Promo Only
Not Found	Kygo, Avicii & Sandro Cavazza	Forever Yours (Avicii Tribute) – Single	2020	
Not Found	Purple Disco Machine	In My Arms – Single	2020	
Not Found	Arno Cost & Norman Doray	Darlin' – Single	2020	
Not Found	Jax Jones and Martin Solveig pres Europa	Tequila (feat. RAYE) – Single	2020	21
Not Found	Jonas Blue & Paloma Faith	Mistakes – Single	2020	
Not Found	Joy Club	In The Night – Single	2020	
Not Found	Alesso & DubVision	One Last Time – Single	2020	
Not Found	Wankelmut & SVEA	Give & Take – Single	2020	
Not Found	Jack Back	Superstar DJ – Single	2020	
Not Found	Daniel Blume	Catch Feelings – Single	2020	
Not Found	Showtek & Spree Wilson	The Weekend (feat. Eva Shaw) – Single	2020	
Not Found	Punctual	Imagine – Single	2020	Promo Only
Not Found	Purple Disco Machine & Sophie and the Giants	Hypnotized – Single	2020	
Not Found	Hayden James & Icona Pop	Right Time – Single	2020	
Not Found	Mike Mago	On Repeat (feat. Kelli-Leigh) – Single	2020	Promo Only
Not Found	Seeb, GOODBOYS & HRVY	Unfamiliar – Single	2020	
Not Found	Halsey & Marshmello	Be Kind – Single	2020	Promo Only
Not Found	Chris Lake	I Remember – Single	2020	Promo Only
Not Found	Rasster	Sad (Imanbek xxx Remix) – Single	2020	Promo Only, Release Later
Not Found	Mike Mago	Recognise – Single	2020	
Not Found	Alok, Axel Cooper & Stefy De Cicco	Te Boté – Single	2020	
Not Found	Wankelmut	Can't Force Love – Single	2020	
Not Found	Kungs	Dopamine (feat. JHart) – Single	2020	Promo Only
TIV447	Jonas Blue & MAX	Naked – Single	2020	
Not Found	Hayden James & Azteck	Waves of Gold (feat. Paije) – Single	2020	Promo Only
Not Found	Alok, Martin Jensen, Jason Derulo	Don't Cry For Me – Single	2020	
Not Found	Sub Focus & Wilkinson	Just Hold On – Single	2020	
TIV437	Paris Green	Oh Yes (feat. Marvin Gaye & Tammi Terrell) – Single	2020	

== Notes ==
- A Released on Positiva's sub label Additive instead after promo release
- B Charted on the UK budget album chart as the total track length of the format exceeded the 20 minute rule in place at the time
- C Released through EMI instead after promo release
- D Released through EMI subsidiary Feverpitch instead after promo release

== See also ==
- The Positiva Ambient Collection (1993)
- List of electronic music record labels
