= Anitta (singer) =

Brazilian singer and songwriter (born 1993)

- Anitta at the 2026 Latin Grammy Awards
- Born: Larissa de Macedo Machado; 30 March 1993 (age 33); Rio de Janeiro, Brazil
- Occupations: Singer; songwriter; actress; dancer
- Years active: 2011–present
- Awards: Full list
- Musical career
- Genres: Pop; Brazilian funk; reggaeton
- Instrument: Vocals
- Works: Discography
- Labels: Floresta; Republic; Universal Latin; Warner; Warner Brasil
- Website: anitta.com.br (in Spanish, English, and Portuguese)

Larissa de Macedo Machado (born 30 March 1993), known professionally as Anitta (Portuguese: [ɐˈnitɐ]), is a Brazilian singer, songwriter, dancer, actress, and occasional television host. One of Brazil's most prominent artists, she became known for her versatile style and mixing genres such as pop, funk, reggaeton and electronic music. She has received numerous accolades, including one Latin Grammy Award, Brazilian Music Award, four Latin American Music Awards, three MTV Music Video Awards, nine MTV Europe Music Awards, two Guinness World Records, and nominations for three Grammy Award, in addition to being the Brazilian female singer with the most entries on the Billboard Hot 100. She has been referred to as the "Queen of Brazilian Pop".

Shortly after the release of her debut single, "Meiga e Abusada" (2012), Anitta signed a recording contract with Warner Music Brazil and released her self-titled debut album in 2013, which entered at number one and was certified platinum in Brazil. It produced the hit singles "Show das Poderosas" and "Zen", her first number-one on the Billboard Brasil Hot 100 and Latin Grammy nomination. In 2014, she released her second studio album Ritmo Perfeito alongside the live album Meu Lugar to further commercial success. Her third studio album, Bang (2015), spawned the top-ten singles "Deixa Ele Sofrer" and "Bang" and cemented Anitta's standing as a major star on the Brazilian record charts. In 2017, Anitta released her first song fully in Spanish, "Paradinha", which accelerated her crossover to Spanish-language Latin and reggaeton genres, and released a project entitled CheckMate, featuring several international collaborations and hits such as "Downtown" and "Vai Malandra". Her trilingual fourth studio-visual album, Kisses (2019), earned a nomination for the Latin Grammy Award for Best Urban Music Album.

Anitta's diamond-certified fifth studio album, Versions of Me (2022), contained the lead single "Envolver", which topped the Billboard Brazil Songs chart and became her breakthrough hit internationally. The song peaked at number one on the Billboard Global Excl. U.S. chart and number two on the Billboard Global 200, making Anitta the first Brazilian artist to lead a global music chart. It also garnered her a Guinness World Record for being the first solo Latin artist and the first Brazilian act to reach number one on Spotify's Global Top 200 chart. She became the first Brazilian artist to win the American Music Award for Favorite Latin Artist and the MTV Video Music Award for Best Latin for "Envolver"; she won the latter award two more consecutive times for "Funk Rave" and "Mil Veces" from her sixth studio album, Funk Generation (2024), which earned her first Brazilian Music Awards win for Release in a Foreign Language. She also earned her second Grammy (2025) nomination for Best Latin Pop Album; previously, Anitta had been nominated for Best New Artist at the 65th Annual Grammy Awards and featured on Forbes's 2023 30 Under 30. She received another nomination for Best Global Music Album for Equilibrium (2027), for which also won the Latin Grammy Award for Best Portuguese Language Contemporary Pop Album.

Anitta has been described by the media as a sex symbol and is considered as one of the most influential artists in the world on social media, featuring on the Time 100 Next list. She is also known for her philanthropic work. The causes she promotes include climate change, conservation, the environment, health, and right to food; she also dedicates herself to advocating for LGBTQ, indigenous and women's rights.

== Early life ==
Larissa de Macedo Machado was born and raised in Honório Gurgel, a Rio de Janeiro neighbourhood with one of the lowest HDIs. She is the youngest daughter of Míriam Macedo and Mauro Machado of Syrian and Afro-Brazilian descent. Her parents later divorced, with her mother obtaining custody. Her brother, Renan Machado, is one of her music producers and jointly manages her career.

She began her singing when she was 8, joining the choir of Saint Luzia's Parish in her neighbourhood at her maternal grandparents’ insistence. She took her first English classes at 11, having demonstrated above-average intelligence and an interest in an academic career. Her mother's teacher later gave her free dance lessons.

After graduating from Colégio Pedro II, she finished a technical course in public administration in high school. In 2013, she decided to pursue her artistic career and won the "Best New Artist" award given by the Associação Paulista de Críticos de Arte, an organisation based in São Paulo, Brazil, that honours the best in the Brazilian arts.

Anitta's stage name was inspired by the character "Anita" in the book Presença de Anita, adapted as a teleseries by TV Globo in 2001. She thought the character was "amazing" because "[Anita] could be sexy without looking vulgar; girl and woman at the same time".

Anitta speaks several languages: Portuguese (her native language), English and Spanish, as well as some Italian and French. Furthermore, she has taken Japanese classes and plans to learn Korean.

== Career ==
=== 2011–2013: Debut album and initial success ===
Anitta's career as a professional singer started in 2011, when she was introduced to the funk carioca producer Renato Azevedo, known as Batutinha. She was invited to record some demo tapes for him, as he had seen some of her home videos on YouTube. She then signed a contract with independent label Furacão 2000, which was specialized on releasing Brazilian funk music. She then released her debut single "Eu Vou Ficar", which was played on local radio stations in Rio de Janeiro and the song was included in the compilation album Armagedom, which included other artists from the musical scene. With advice by her producer, she decided to put another "t" in her stage name, which was inspired by Brazilian television series Presença de Anita. A year later, the song "Fica Só Olhando" was included on the Armagedom II release. Her first televised appearance was on 16 May 2012, on TV program Cante se Puder, on SBT, where she performed inside a glass of beer. In June 2012, she chose to not renew the Furacão 2000 contract and signed with K2L Entertainment.

In January 2013, Anitta signed a recording contract with Warner Music Brasil and released the single "Meiga e Abusada". The song was then added to the telenovela Amor à Vida's soundtrack and became one of the most requested songs in Brazilian radio stations in early 2013. A music video for the song was shot in Las Vegas, and directed by American director Blake Farber. The song was chosen as lead single of her self-titled debut album was released in June 2013.

In June 2013, the music video for "Show das Poderosas" became the most watched music video on YouTube in Brazil, surpassing 160 million views in less than a week after the release. The impact also helped the song to make it onto charts, which remained for many weeks at the top of the best selling music in iTunes Brazil, and making it the third most played song on the radio in the country during 2013. At the time, with that, the singer's fee per presentation increased to US$10.000.

=== 2014–2015: Meu Lugar and Ritmo Perfeito ===
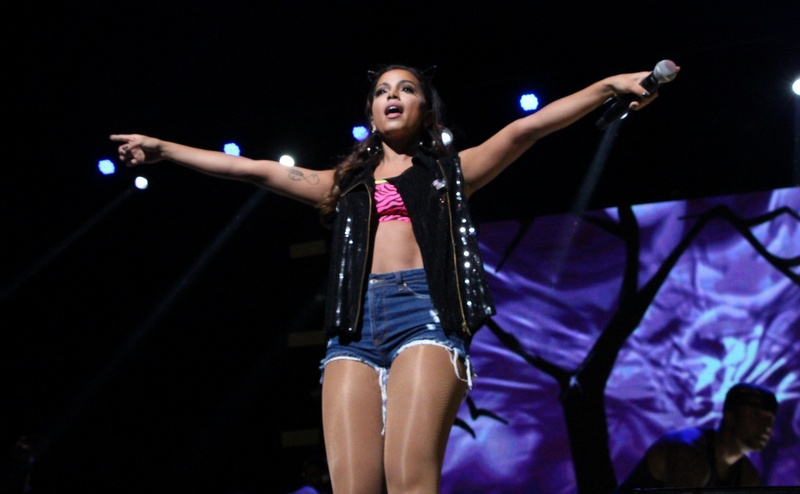
Anitta during a concert in February 2015

Anitta announced in 2013 that she would start her first concert tour on that year. The sales to the tickets for the special series of shows, went on sale in November 2013. The event took place in Rio de Janeiro at HSBC Arena on 15 February 2014, and was attended by about 10,000 people. The album was previously titled Fantástico Mundo de Anitta (Anitta's World), but was later renamed to Meu Lugar (My Place), after the release of the song "Quem Sabe" on iTunes. The song "Blá Blá Blá" was released as the lead single from the album on 23 March 2014. Despite the success in minor proportions, the song reached the number two on the Hot 100 Airplay chart in Brazil. The album was released on 4 June 2014, just a day after the release of her second studio album, Ritmo Perfeito.

The second single from the project was a song featuring rapper Projota titled "Cobertor", which reached a number 43 on Brazilian charts. The following single "Na Batida" was released on 31 July 2014. Its music video reached 1 million views on YouTube after just 24 hours. The single had a minor success on charts, peaking at number four on the Hot 100 Airplay chart. Other singles released from the album were "Ritmo Perfeito" and "No Meu Talento", featuring MC Guimê. In April 2014, she made her acting debut as Helena Boccato in comedy film Copa de Elite. In August 2014, she founded her own management company, Rodamoinho Produções Artísticas. In December, she also starred as goddess Solaris in television film Didi e o Segredo dos Anjos.

=== 2015–2016: Bang and collaborations ===
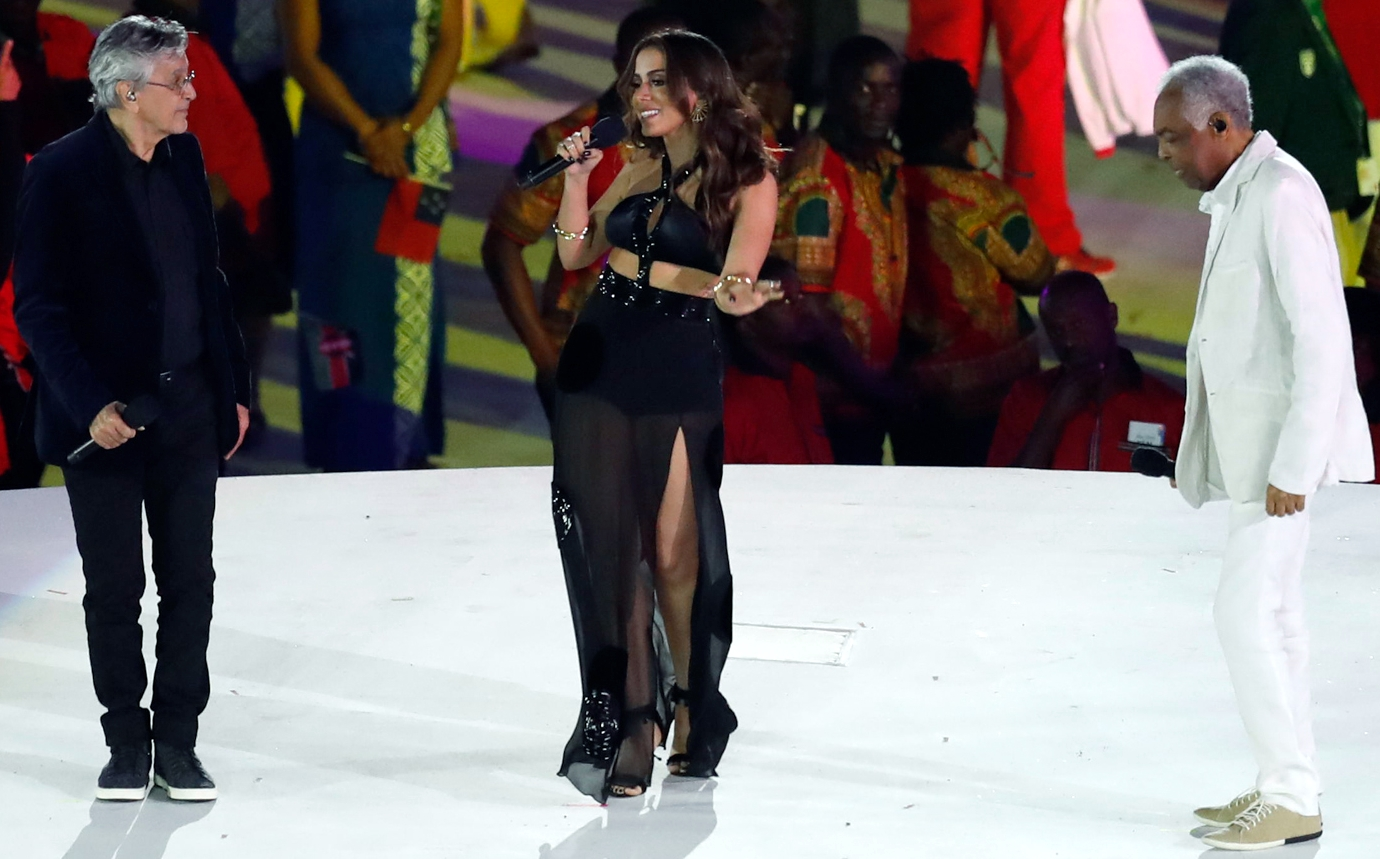
Anitta with singers Caetano Veloso (left) and Gilberto Gil (right) performing at the 2016 Summer Olympics opening ceremony

Her third studio album Bang was released in October 2015. It was selected by Billboard Brasil as one of the most anticipated albums of the year. Album's cover art was shot by Giovanni Bianco. Bang debuted at number three on the Brazilian albums chart with 40,000 copies sold in the first week. The album sold 300,000 copies as of May 2016, surpassing sales of her debut album, which has sold 170,000 copies. It was also certified Platinum by the Associação Brasileira de Produtores de Discos (ABPD). The first single of the album, "Deixa Ele Sofrer", which was released on 16 July 2015, and reached the top of the iTunes Brazil chart. The song also made Anitta the first Brazilian singer to occupy the top of Spotify Brazil.

The album lead single, "Bang", was her first international success, staying at number one on iTunes and Spotify for several days, and its music video becoming an international viral video and receiving over 320 million views on YouTube. Other singles released from the album were "Essa Mina É Louca" and "Cravo e Canela". In October 2015, the artist won the EMA Worldwide Act Latin America, being the first Brazilian artist to win the award. A collaboration with Jota Quest and Nile Rodgers, entitled "Blecaute", was released in November 2015.

In 2016, Anitta made her debut as a TV hostess, hosting the third season of cable television channel Multishow show Música Boa Ao Vivo (Good Music:Live). The singer was also featured on a remix of the song "Ginza", by singer J Balvin. In August 2016, she released a single titled "Sim ou Não" featuring Colombian singer Maluma, and performed at the 2016 Summer Olympics opening ceremony along with Brazilian singers and composers Caetano Veloso and Gilberto Gil. The next month, she signed her first international contract with talent agency William Morris Endeavor. In November 2016, she won the Best Brazilian Act category at the 2016 MTV Europe Music Awards.

Also in 2016, "Bang" was added to the annual video game series Just Dance 2017. On 25 October 2016, Ubisoft Brazil shot a flash mob in Avenida Paulista (São Paulo), where many people danced to the routine of the game to promote the new instalment of the series. Ubisoft also promoted an exclusive pocket show with the singer for the release of the game. There, the singer sang and danced her track in game as demonstration. Meanwhile, she gave a lot of interviews, talking about her song was added the game soundtrack. and the song was selected for the digital qualifications of 2016 Just Dance World Championship.

=== 2017–2018: Checkmate, Solo, international breakthrough and collaborations ===
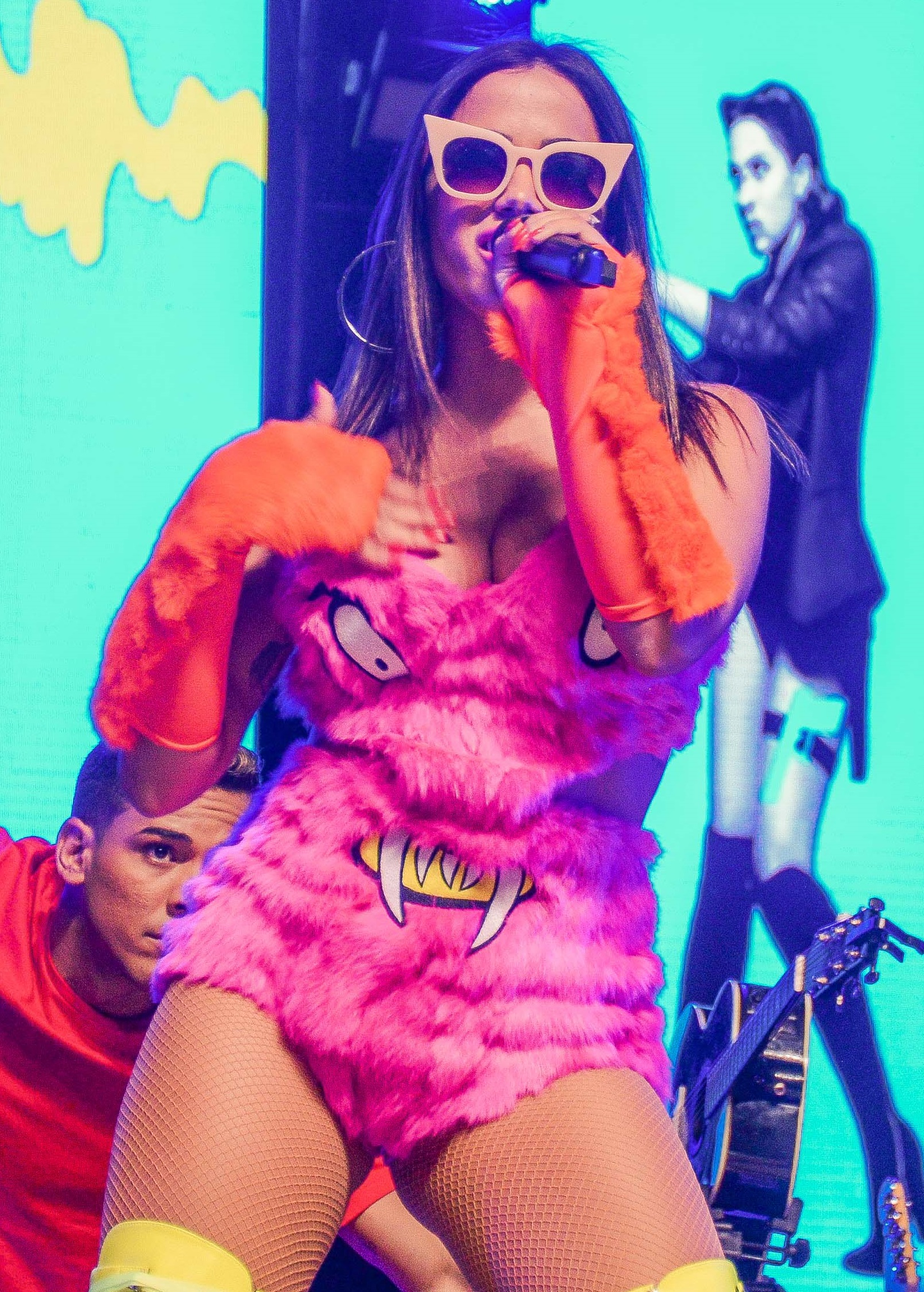
Anitta performing at Citibank Hall in São Paulo, October 2017

In January 2017, the singer was featured on singles including "Loka", by female duo Simone & Simaria, and featured on single "Você Partiu Meu Coração", recorded by Nego do Borel and featured Wesley Safadão. In May 2017, "Switch", a collaboration with Australian rapper Iggy Azalea, became her first single in English to be released. The same month, she released a single in both Portuguese and Spanish titled "Paradinha". In June of the same year, the American group Major Lazer released "Sua Cara", along with Anitta and drag queen singer Pabllo Vittar. The song is part of the band's fourth EP, Know No Better. In a few hours, the video exceeded the mark of 5 million views on YouTube. After its release, the song became an international hit, appearing as one hundred most played in Global Spotify, and spent more than five weeks on Billboard's Dance/Electronic Songs chart, making it the first Portuguese-language song to feature on that chart. The music video was also a hit, reaching more than 20 million views in one day.

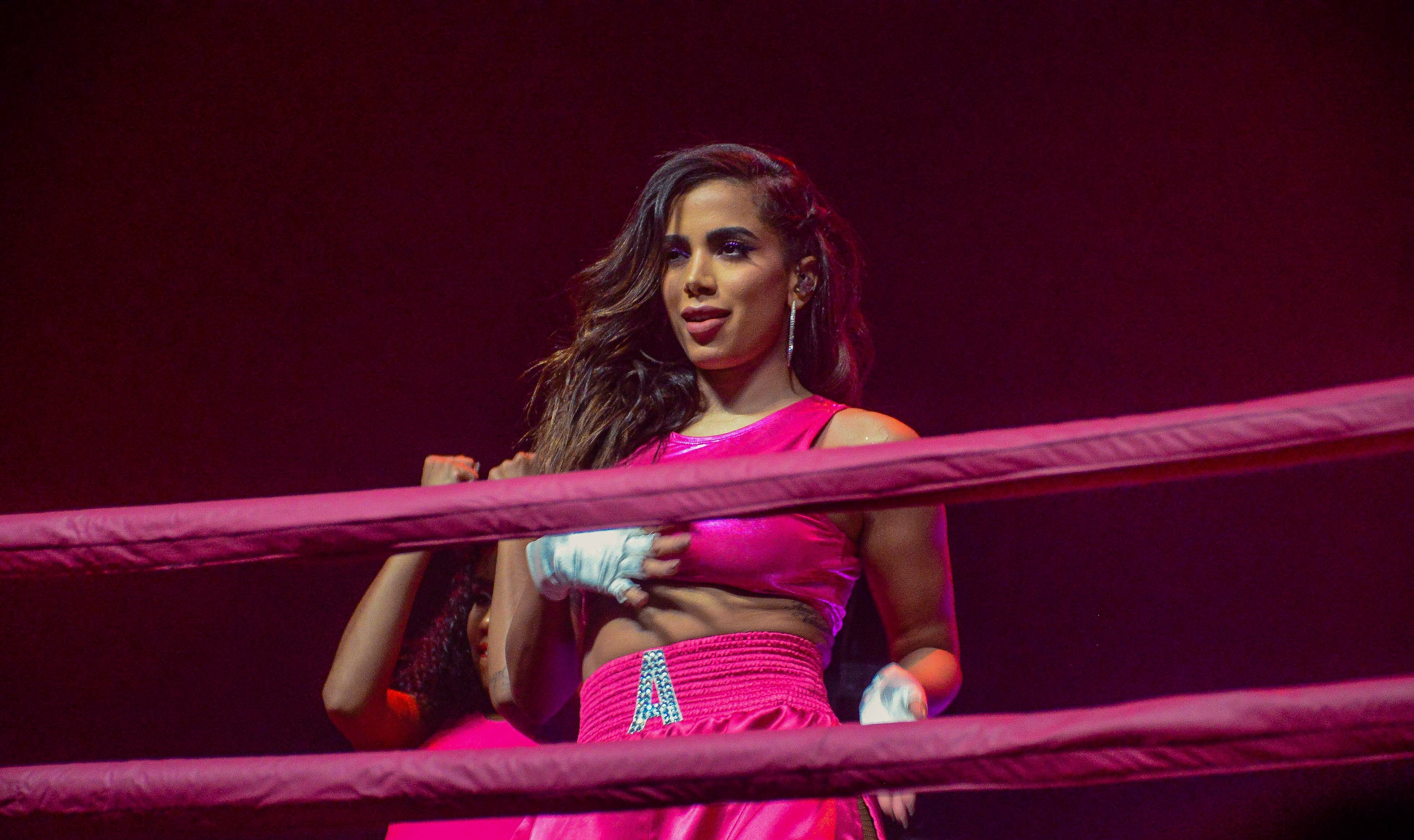
Anitta at the 'Combatchy' party, November 2017

On 3 September, Anitta released the single "Will I See You", a collaboration with American producer and songwriter Poo Bear. It was the first song of the singer's project entitled CheckMate, in which she would release a new song a month. On 13 October, in partnership with Swedish DJ Alesso, Anitta released the second song from CheckMate, titled "Is That for Me". On 19 November, the singer released, in her second collaboration with J Balvin, another track from the CheckMate project, "Downtown". The composition became an international success, entering in the "Top 50 Global", list of the 50 most executed songs in the world, making Anitta the first Brazilian to appear in the ranking. On 18 December 2017, Anitta released a new single, "Vai Malandra", featuring MC Zaac, Maejor, Tropkillaz and DJ Yuri Martins; this was the fourth and last song from the CheckMate project.

On 1 January 2018, singer Anitta attracted over 2.4 million people to her concert in Copacabana, Rio de Janeiro. In January, another collaboration with J Balvin, "Machika", was released.

Two months later, she released another single in Spanish, titled "Indecente". In April, she debuted her new TV show on Multishow titled Anitta Entrou no Grupo. In June, she performed at Rock in Rio festival in Lisbon. She also made concerts in nightclubs in Paris and London as part of the Made in Brazil tour. The same month, she released a single titled "Medicina". "Medicina" featured her for the second time in the Just Dance series with two exclusive routines for the same track. The latest one was presented at Just Dance 2019 World Cup in Brasil. In September, she was featured on a single by production duo Seakret, "Perdendo a Mão", featuring Jojo Maronttinni. Later that same month, she debuted as one of the coaches on La Voz... México. The next month, she was featured on Colombian singer Greeicy Rendón's single "Jacuzzi". In November, Anitta released a multilingual extended play (EP) titled Solo, which has three songs in different languages, among them "Veneno" and "Não Perco Meu Tempo". Anitta also announced that all songs on the EP would have their respective music videos, which were released simultaneously on the same date as the EP and was the subject of a Shots Studios-produced docu-series titled Vai Anitta, which aired on Netflix.

=== 2019–2020: Kisses and Brasileirinha ===
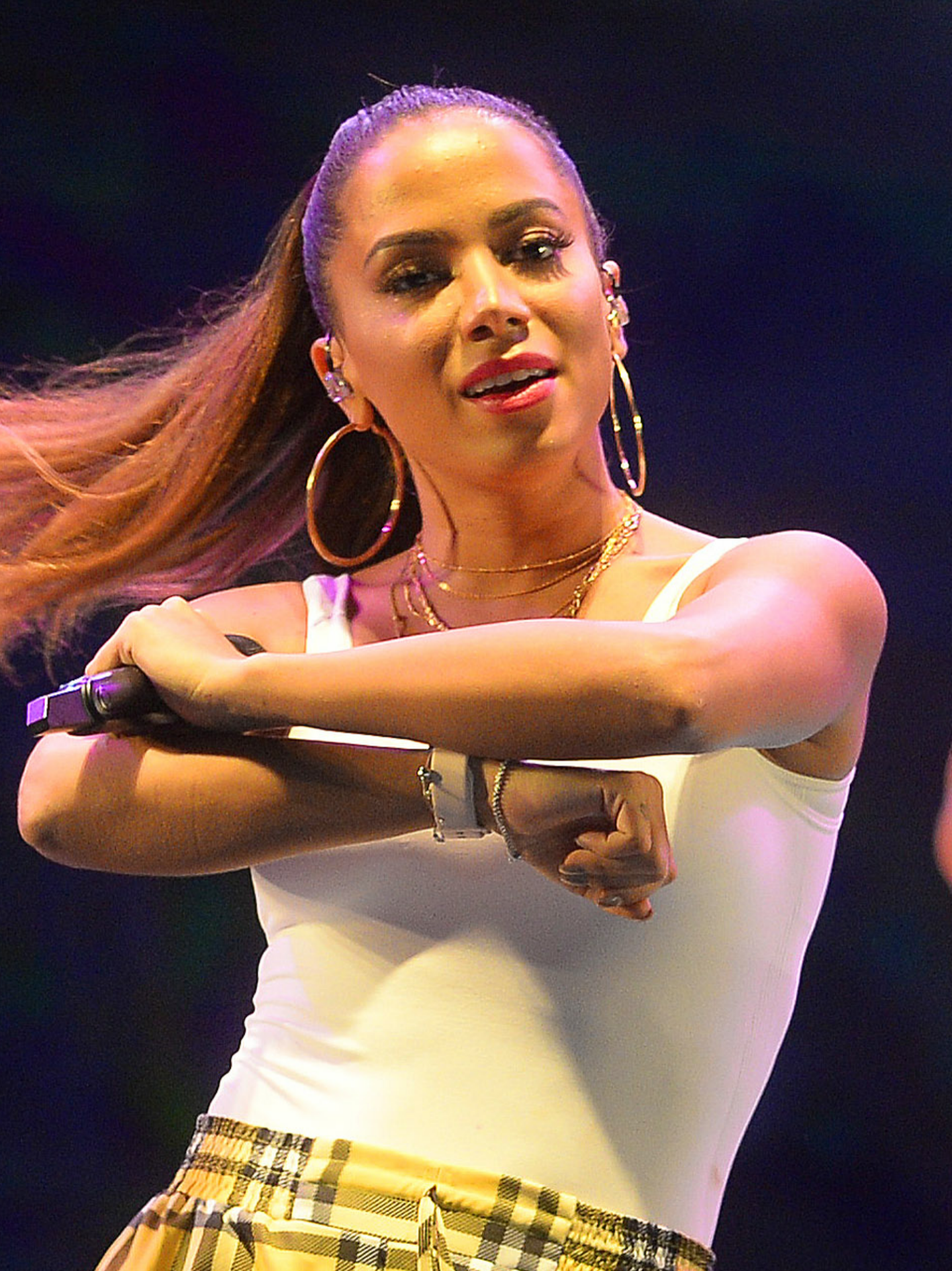
Anitta performing in Brasília in 2019

The year 2019, in Anitta's career, was marked by musical partnerships and participation in tracks by other singers.

In February 2019, the artist released five songs: "Terremoto" (whose music video is based on "I'm Still in Love with You" by Sean Paul.) with Kevinho; "Bola Rebola" (single similar to "Vai Malandra") with Tropkillaz, J Balvin and MC Zaac; a re-recording of "Zé do Caroço" with producers Jetlag; "Te Lo Dije" with Natti Natasha and "Favela Chegou" with Ludmilla. On 15 March, the song "R.I.P." Mexican Sofía Reyes with participation of Brazilian and British Rita Ora.

On 5 April, the singer's fourth studio album, entitled Kisses, was released. It was her first visual and trilingual album. In the United States, the album reached the fourth position on the Latin Pop Albums and number 16 on the Top Latin Albums charts. In Spain, the album reached forty-sixth position on the PROMUSICAE list. The album's lead single, "Poquito", with American rapper Swae Lee, was released in conjunction with the album.

Anitta is present in the soundtrack of the film UglyDolls that was released in April of the same year. The singer appears on the track "Ugly" which was recorded in three languages: English, Spanish and Portuguese. On 14 June Madonna launches Madame X, where Anitta participates in the track "Faz Gostoso", a re-recording by Portuguese singer Blaya.

Anitta again partnered with Major Lazer, – the first in 2017 on the song "Sua Cara" – this time on "Make It Hot", a track released on 19 June and featured on the group's Music Is the Weapon album. On 21 June, the song "Pa 'lante" was released along with Alex Sensation and Luis Fonsi. On 11 July, "Muito Calor" was launched, a partnership between Anitta and the singer Ozuna. The song was part of the singer's third studio album, entitled Nibiru, but was removed for reasons that have not been clarified. On 6 September, the partnership between Anitta and Léo Santana, "Contatinho", was launched. The song was recorded live, as the opening song of Léo Santana's DVD, called Levada do Gigante. Still in September, on the 30th, together with the group Black Eyed Peas, they released the single "Explosion". In the same month, Anitta signed with Skol Beats to become the brand's head of creativity and innovation.

On 4 October, she collaborated with the singer Vitão, "Complicado". Anitta recorded the song "Pantera" for the soundtrack to the movie Charlie's Angels, released in October, the executive production of the soundtrack was written by Ariana Grande. In the same month, the artist started the Brasileirinha project, which had released songs in Portuguese only until December. The first single released was the song "Some Que Ele Vem Atrás" in partnership with the singer Marília Mendonça, the music video was recorded live during the 26th edition of the Brazilian Music Multishow Award. "Combatchy" was released in November as a second single, the song features singers Lexa, Luísa Sonza and MC Rebecca. On 23 November, she participated in the opening show of the Copa Libertadores de América Final that took place in Peru alongside Colombian singer Sebástian Yatra and Argentine singers Fito Páez and Tini, performing the song "Y Dale Alegría A Mi Corazón". The third single from the Brasileirinha project, "Meu Mel", in partnership with the trio Melim, was released on 13 December; "Até o Céu", a duet with MC Cabelinho and the last track of the project, was made available on 20 December.

In June 2020, Anitta signed a recording contract with Warner Records in the U.S., ahead of her U.S. debut album expected to release later in 2020. The album will be executive produced by Ryan Tedder.

In August 2020, Anitta released her first single in Italy with Fred De Palma, "Paloma" which became one of the most shazamed songs of the month in the country, and becoming the song by a Brazilian artist in the highest position on the Italian charts. In August 2020 she was also featured on WC No Beat's album on a track called "Cena de Novela" alongside Djonga & PK and also featured on the trap song "Tá Com o Papato" of Papatinho with Dfideliz & BIN.

On 18 September 2020, Anitta began a new phase in her international career, releasing "Me Gusta" in collaboration with Cardi B and Myke Towers. The song reached the 14th position on the iTunes chart in the United States and 32 on Spotify United States. Additionally, the song debuted with over 2 million plays in the top 200 in 38 countries on Spotify and 87 countries on Apple Music, as well as on the global charts of both platforms at 24 and 90, respectively. Furthermore, the song debuted on various Billboard charts. "Me Gusta" became Anitta's first entry on the Billboard Hot 100. In September 2020, Anitta questioned Google about the meaning of the word "Patroa" in Portuguese, as following Google's previous definition the word meant that "Patrão" (Masculine) was the owner or boss, while the word "Patroa" (Feminine) was defined as the boss's wife. The singer thus managed to get the University of Oxford to change the definition of the word in the dictionary and how it was displayed in Google Searches.

=== 2021–2022: Versions of Me and worldwide recognition and success ===
In March 2021, Anitta and Maluma were part of the Remix of "Mi Niña" with Wisin, Myke Towers and Los Legendarios.

On 14 April 2021, Anitta joined Wisin, Maluma and Myke Towers and opened the Latin American Music Awards with the remix of "Mi Niña". In May, the Latin Grammy organised the event "Ellas y su Musica", which seeks to honor women in the world of Latin music, Anitta performed "Girl from Rio". In May, Anitta together with Puerto Rican singer and rapper Lunay released the song "Todo o Nada". The song entered the top 100 of all Latin American countries and Spain, top 50 in 5 countries, having several highlights on the Billboard charts as well.

In June 2021, Anitta released her first single in France with Dadju, "Mon Soleil", The song became one of the most heard songs on the French-speaking charts, becoming the highest position by a Brazilian artist. The song earned Anitta two nominations in the main categories at the NRJ Music Awards. In June 2021, Anitta released her second single in Italian with Fred De Palma, "Un Altro Ballo". The partnership became one of the most heard songs on the Italian charts, just not surpassing the success of its first single in the country. Also in June 2021, the singer joined the board of directors of startup Nubank.

In July 2021, in addition to performing and winning some awards at the Heat Latin Music Awards, Anitta was honored with a special recognition award for her contribution to female empowerment. Anitta and Lunay performed "Todo o Nada" on 22 July, at Premios Juventud.

On 11 September, Anitta performed several songs at the Triller Fight Club in Florida. In partnership with Burger King, Anitta performed "Girl from Rio" at the MTV Video Music Awards on 12 September, in addition to winning her own commercial for her vegan hamburger in her name, which was widely publicized on American TV. Anitta appeared, for the first time, at the Met Gala 2021, in September alongside Brazilian entrepreneur in the footwear sector Alexandre Birman.

On 18 October 2021, Anitta joined Billie Eilish, Blackpink, Barack Obama, Pope Francisco, Jaden Smith and others for the YouTube Originals special that aims to raise awareness about climate change on the planet, Dear Earth. The singer performed her single "Girl from Rio". In September, alongside Charli XCX, Anitta joined as a mentor in the singing competition held by Billboard and Samsung Galaxy, Billboard NXT.

On 14 November, Anitta made a surprise appearance at the MTV Europe Music Awards, talking to host Saweetie. In November 2021, Anitta performed the opening performance of the Latin Grammy alongside Gloria Estefan and Carlinhos Brown. Alongside Jeremy Scott and dressed as Moschino, Anitta attended the amfAR benefit gala in November.

Anitta was one of the guests at the Community Organized Relief Effort (CORE) charity event, created by actor Sean Penn, in addition to performing some songs, she also auctioned off an experience with her at her shows at the Brazilian Carnival, where the winning bid was 110,000 dollars.

On 9 December, alongside Pedro Sampaio, she participated in the single "No Chão Novinha". The song debuted in the top 10 on the Brazilian chart, Top 30 on the Portuguese chart and Top 170 on the Global charts. In December, Anitta attended the Variety 2021 Music Hitmakers Brunch and handed the Crossover Award to Kali Uchis. Anitta, Saweetie, Jack Harlow and 24kGoldn were some of the performers at Miley's New Year's Eve Party, hosted by Miley Cyrus and Pete Davidson, on 31 December 2021.

Anitta was part of the soundtrack of Fast and Furious 9 with the song "Furiosa" and Sing 2, with the song "Suéltate" featuring Sam i, BIA & Jarina De Marco.

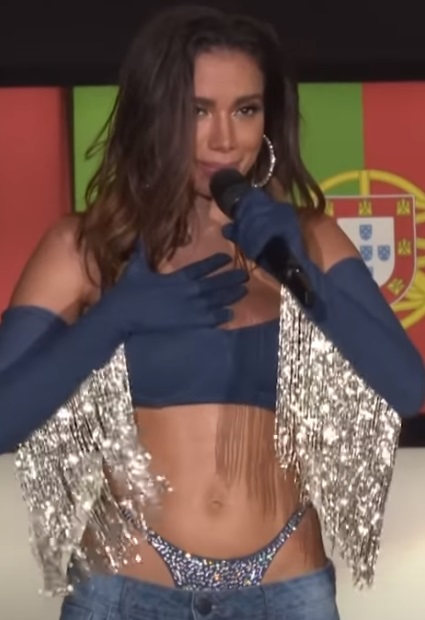
Anitta performing at Rock in Rio 2019

On 3 January 2022, it was announced that Anitta had signed a worldwide publishing agreement with Sony Music Publishing. Her Spanish single "Envolver" released by late 2021, topped the Global Top 200 on Spotify in March 2022, making Anitta the first Brazilian artist and the first Latin artist with a solo song to do so. It also become the most streamed song in a single-day in 2022 (7.278 million) at the time. Anitta still reached the top on Deezer Global and YouTube Global. "Envolver" even managed to top the Billboard Global Excl. U.S. chart, becoming the first Latin woman to do so with a solo song; she still remained at number two on the Billboard Global 200. Still with "Envolver" Anitta got several entries on the Billboard charts, one of the main ones being her second entry on the Hot 100, first solo entry, the song became the third highest entry of a Latin solo song on the chart, behind only "Telepatía" by Kali Uchis and "Provenza" by Karol G both at 25, making it the second-highest solo song entry entirely in Spanish by a Latin female artist. The song received praise from the international press and entered several "best of the year" lists, such as the Los Angeles Times, Billboard and more. Rolling Stones magazine named the song the 81st best reggaeton song of all time. In February 2022, Anitta performed at Premios Lo Nuestro along with Justin Quiles the remix version of "Envolver", in addition to "No Chão Novinha".

On 26 March, she took the Lollapalooza Brazil main stage alongside Miley Cyrus and performed together the single "Boys Don't Cry" the live version became a track for the deluxe version of the album Attentions: Miley Live. With the song "Boys Don't Cry", Anitta expanded her record as the Brazilian artist with the highest number of number-one hits worldwide on iTunes. The solo track reached the top spot in 45 countries. On 31 March 2022, Anitta announced her fifth studio and second multilingual album, Versions of Me, would be released on 12 April. Ryan Tedder executive produced the album. The singles "Me Gusta" (featuring Cardi B and Myke Towers), "Girl from Rio", "Faking Love" (featuring Saweetie), "Envolver", and "Boys Don't Cry" preceded the album. Becoming the first Brazilian pop album to reach the mark of 1 billion streams on Spotify. The album reached the highest debut by a Brazilian artist on iTunes, Apple Music and Spotify in the United States, the album was the most streamed in the world on its debut on Spotify Global upon its release, in addition to being the third-highest debut on Spotify in the United States. Versions of Me broke the record for the biggest Spotify debut by a Brazilian artist in the platform's history with over 9.1 million streams. In addition, the album surpassed the debut of Camila Cabello's new album, Familia, also being the album by a Latin woman with the highest debut in 2022. Forbes, Rolling Stone, NME, Billboard and The Line of Best Fit were some of the portals that positively evaluated Versions of Me. In the same month of April, she became the first Brazilian to perform on the main stage of the Coachella festival. In the same month, she got her first nomination at the MTV Video Music Awards for "Envolver" in the "Best Latin" category; a main show performance was also confirmed. By popular vote, the song won the category, making Anitta the first female solo artist to receive the award. Anitta also became the first artist from Brazil to perform and win an American Music Awards.

On 5 May 2022, Anitta was the female lead in the music video for "First Class", by rapper Jack Harlow. On 13 May 2022, Anitta was one of the international guests at the first Billboard MusicCon where she spoke with other artists on topics such as the evolution of the music scene in genres and cultures, women in music, among other related topics, she also performed several songs in the event. On 15 May, she and Michael Bublé were one of the presenters at the Billboard Music Awards. Dressed by the Italian brand Moschino, led by creative director Jeremy Scott, Anitta attended, for her second time, the annual Met Gala 2022 ball, in May.

In June 2022, Madame Tussauds New York unveiled their wax figure of Anitta.

Still in June 2022, Anitta started a promotional tour at the main music festivals in Europe. Anitta started the series of concerts in Spain and ended with a super concert in Portugal. The promotional tour went through nine European countries (Spain, Ireland, Portugal, Denmark, Sweden, the Netherlands, Switzerland, Italy and France). The show in Poland was canceled due to the ongoing Russian invasion of Ukraine. On 18 June, Anitta performed in one of the largest stadiums in France, Le Parc de Princes, in Paris for an audience of more than 50 thousand people together with Dadju, with the song "Mon Soleil". On 23 June, she gave interviews in French territory for NRJ Hit Music Only and for the Quotidien program, in addition to performing "Envolver".

On 6 July 2022, Argentine singer Tini released "La Loto", a collaboration with Anitta and American singer Becky G, which served as the seventh single from Tini's upcoming fourth album. The song became Anitta's highest peak on the Billboard Hot 100 Argentina, at number seven. On 8 July 2022, the song on "No Más" was released in collaboration with Murda Beatz, J Balvin, Quavo and Pharrell. The song became the best position for a Brazilian artist in the history of iTunes in the United States, at 4th position, it also reached the first position on Amazon Best Sellers in the United States and its highest position on Deezer US in 14th, in addition to reaching the first position on Billboard Rap Digital Song Sales and the 13th on the Billboard Digital Song Sales.

In August 2022, Anitta released the deluxe version of Versions of Me, which featured collaborations with Maluma, "El Que Espera", and Missy Elliott, "Lobby", in addition to the trilingual version of "Dançarina Remix" with Pedro Sampaio, Dadju, Nicky Jam and MC Pedrinho. "Dançarina Remix" reached number 11 on the France Single Charts, Anitta's second highest position, behind only "Mon Soleil" number eight, and becoming Anitta's song with the most days in the top 50 on Spotify France, in addition to receiving a platinum certificate in French territory, also reaching first place on the French Shazam. "Lobby" earned Anitta her first entry on Japan's largest streaming platform, Line Music, making her the first artist from Brazil to achieve this milestone.

On 28 October 2022, the Black Eyed Peas released "Simply the Best" the opening track and the second single from their album Elevation, a collaboration with Anitta and El Alfa. In November 2022, in addition to being nominated in two categories at the Latin Grammy Awards, Anitta also performed a performance of "Envolver" and a Funk Dance Medley, she was also one of the hosts of the night. In November, she still performed at Rihanna's Savage X Fenty Show. Anitta was listed by Forbes 30 Under 30 North America 2023, in the music category, as one of the leaders of the next generation of Latin American music. The list aims to recognise artists who make a significant contribution to the world's recording industry. After successful releases, nominations for dozens of world awards and accomplishments achieved throughout the year, she was nominated for the 2023 Grammy Awards in the Best New Artist category.

On 2 November, Anitta joined Lil Nas X, BTS and Tyler, the Creator and was honored with the WSJ Magazine Innovator Awards 2022, held by The Wall Street Journal, which honors visionaries in various areas of entertainment. In November, she performed at the Los 40 Music Awards, becoming one of the most talked about subjects in Spain due to her performance of "Envolver". On 15 November 2022, Anitta released a version of "Practice" ("Prooshtis" in the game's language) entirely in Simlish, for The Sims Sessions global campaign in The Sims 4, thus being the sixth language in which she sings. On 30 November, Anitta released her third EP, À procura da Anitta perfeita, on the Warner Music Brasil label. It is Anitta's first project entirely in Portuguese since the album Bang!. The EP was leaked ahead of time, some songs were made available on some digital platforms, without prior disclosure and by surprise. All songs debuted in the top 60 of Spotify Brazil and Portugal, with approximately 2 million streams in 24 hours.

On 18 December, she performed at iHeartradio y100's Jingle Ball at the FLA Live Arena. On 27 December 2022, Guinness World Records chose to highlight the top six music artists of 2022, Anitta joined Taylor Swift, BTS, Harry Styles, Billie Eilish, Adele and were named in a list of 2022's Iconic Record Breakers.

=== 2023–2024: Acting debut and Funk Generation ===
On 20 January, Anitta won the "Best Global Act" award at the All Africa Music Awards, the largest award ceremony in the African continent. This achievement made her the first Latin artist to receive this honor. On 23 January, Anitta received 6 nominations at Lo Nuestro Awards, one of the most important Latin music awards. Furthermore, Anitta also became an ambassador for Lay's on 17 January, one of the most well-known snack brands in the world. She starred in a post-Super Bowl TV spot for the "Beat of Joy" campaign, which featured a remix of the song "Envolver" recorded in a studio powered by electricity from more than 6,000 potatoes. This campaign set a Guinness World Record.

On 25 February, after the official end of the 2023 Carnival, Anitta held a gathering of more than 1 million people in her street parade, "Bloco da Anitta" at 7 a.m. in Rio de Janeiro.

On 2 March, Anitta was elected by Variety magazine as the seventh most impactful international woman of 2023, being the only Brazilian artist on the list. On 8 March, Anitta was once again highlighted by international media, being elected by Bloomberg Línea as one of the women with the most impact in 2023, alongside names like Shakira, Karol G and others. This honor reinforces the relevance and commitment of the artist to themes such as female empowerment and diversity, as well as highlighting her artistic talent. On 9 March, she was confirmed as part of the cast of the seventh season of the popular Spanish Netflix series, Élite. On 12 March, Anitta and Jão released their first collaboration, "Pilantra", which debuted at the top of all streaming platforms in Brazil, occupying the 1st position in iTunes, YouTube, Apple Music and the 4th position on Spotify Brazil and the 28th position in Portugal. The song also achieved the highest debut of a pop song on the Spotify Brazil Charts in 2023, with 1,162,003 streams. With this, Anitta reached her 34th entry in the top 5 most listened-to songs in Brazil. On 13 March, the singer received two nominations at the Latin American Music Awards.

On 4 April 2023, Anitta terminated her contracts with Warner Music Group. On 20 April, the Variety reported that the Brazilian singer has signed a contract with Republic Records in partnership with Universal Music Latin Entertainment. On 1 May, the singer attended her third Met Gala, representing the brand Marc Jacobs, and according to data from Sprinklr, Anitta was the third most mentioned celebrity during the red carpet. On 25 May, the Brazilian singer joined forces with Spanish singer RVFV and Italian singer and rapper Sfera Ebbasta to release the bilingual song, in Spanish and Italian, "Capitán". This is Anitta's third song singing in Italian.

On 10 June, Anitta became the first artist from South America to perform at the UEFA Champions League Final Kick Off Show by Pepsi. The singer took the stage at the Atatürk Olympic Stadium in Istanbul, Turkey, in front of more than 71,412 supporters and an audience of over 700 million people, surpassing the global viewership of the Super Bowl halftime show. During her performance, she showcased the song "Envolver" and debuted the first single, titled "Funk Rave", from her sixth studio album, which also marks her debut on Republic Records. On 14 June, Variety reported that Anitta parted ways with her longtime manager, Brandon Silverstein, the founder/CEO of S10 Entertainment. Then, on 16 June, Variety announced that Rebeca León, founder/CEO of Lionfish Entertainment and former manager of J Balvin and Rosalía, became Anitta's new manager. On 22 June, the singer released the first lead single, "Funk Rave", from her upcoming album under Republic Records. The track debuted, allowing Anitta to extend her record as the artist with the highest number of songs at number one on Apple Music and iTunes in Brazil, making "Funk Rave" her 29th and 88th song, respectively, to achieve this feat. In Spotify Brazil, it debuted in the top 5, becoming the artist's 35th song to reach that position, maintaining her record as the artist with the most songs to enter the top 5 on Spotify Brazil. The release garnered a debut of 2,110,515 unfiltered streams on Spotify and reached the No. 85 position on the global Spotify chart, keeping the singer as the Brazilian artist with the highest debut on Spotify Global for the seventh consecutive year. The music video also premiered on the YouTube trending charts in several countries. On 17 August, Anitta released a "bumper," comprising three singles from her upcoming studio album (Funk Rave, Casi Casi and Used to Be). The project is titled "Funk Generation: A Favela Love Story".

On 12 September, Anitta won the Best Latin category at the Vmas for the second consecutive year, with Brazilian Funk, "Funk Rave", establishing herself as the only female Latin artist to receive this honor, as well as the only artist to win with a solo song. In addition to performing songs from her "Funk Generation: A Favela Love Story" project, and a snippet of her upcoming song, "Grip", the singer took to the main stage once again to perform alongside the South Korean group Tomorrow X Together in their live debut for "Back for More", the artist's first collaboration with K-pop music.

With "Back for More" Anitta extended her record as a Brazilian artist with the biggest peak on the MelOn and Bugs! charts, the biggest music platforms in South Korea. The singer also debuted with the song in the top 10 on the biggest streaming platform in China, QQ Music. The artist also entered the official charts in Indonesia, South Korea, China and the United Kingdom for the first time in her career, being the first artist from Brazil to achieve this feat. The song also reached the top of iTunes Global and European iTunes. The singer became the first Latin artist in history to reach No. 1 on the APMA Charts (Overseas) with "Back for More", a ranking for the one of China's biggest awards, the Asian Pop Music Awards, she was the first Latin artist in history to be nominated for this award in "Best Collaboration" and "Best Producer". Anitta also became the first Latin artist to win one of China's biggest awards, the China Year End Awards in the "Best Selling Latin Single" category with "Back for More".

On 23 September, Anitta was one of the headliners at the Global Citizen Festival in New York City, performing for more than 60 thousand people in Central Park. On 20 October, Anitta debuted as an actress in the Spanish Netflix series, Elite. The series debuted in the top 10 globally and in 40 countries on Netflix.

On 5 November, Anitta won for the second consecutive year in the "Best Latin" category at the Europe Music Awards. Making the singer the most awarded artist in this category. On 25 November, the singer was the headliner of the biggest music festival in Colombia, Megaland Music Fest, performing for more than 40 thousand people. On 2 December, the singer was one of the headliners at the Mega Bash 2023 festival in New Jersey.

On 7 December, the Mexican singer Peso Pluma and Anitta released the song "Bellakeo", the song reached the top 10 of Spotify Global and entered the top 50 of all Latin American countries and the United States, in addition to entering the global top 50 on Apple Music and iTunes. With the song Anitta reached the top of Brazilian music streaming platforms, extending the singer's record as the artist with the most No. 1 on these streaming services. The song also debuted simultaneously on Spotify's viral songs chart in 50 countries. In addition to extending Anitta's third entry on the Hot 100, which made the singer the Brazilian woman, and the third overall, with the most entries in the history of the Billboard Hot 100. In addition to extending the record for the fifth consecutive year for a Brazilian artist with the biggest peak on Spotify globally. On 10 December, Anitta performed at TikTok in the Mix 2023, the first edition of the platform's music festival, in Arizona. The festival was broadcast worldwide and broke the record for the most watched live with more than 33.5 million viewers and a crowd of 17 thousand people. On 28 December, the singer was the headliner at the Virada Salvador Festival, performing in front of more than 200 thousand people.

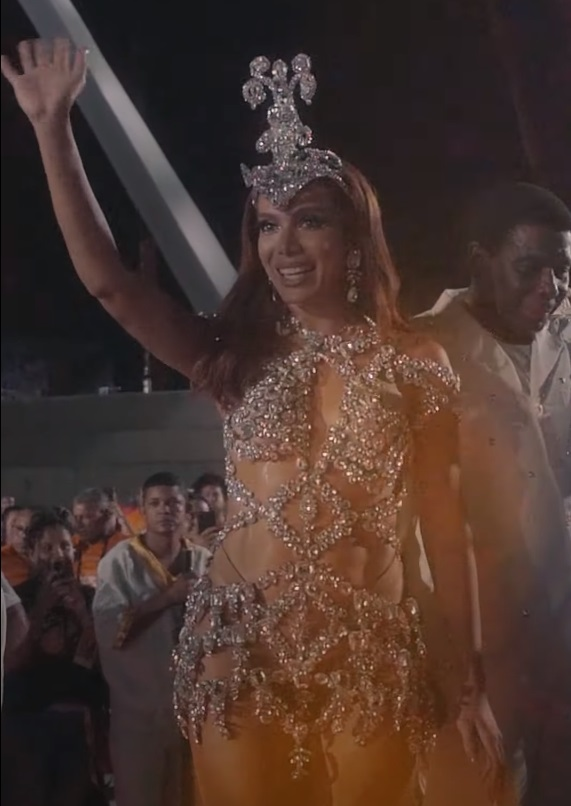
The singer during her performance at Sapucai.

On 6 January 2024, the singer started her carnival tour in 10 Brazilian cities. With all dates sold out, the tour set a record for summer revenue in Brazil, with a profit of over 30 million reais. On 17 February, Anitta closed the Brazilian Carnival, hosting a street block party for over 1 million people in the morning and performing at the opening show of the "Desfile das Campeãs" in honor of the 40 years of the Marquês de Sapucaí. On 22 February, Anitta performed twice at the Premios Lo Nuestro, being the most talked-about artist of the edition on social media. On 28 February, the singer performed at the largest festival in Latin America, Viña del Mar in Chile. She closed the night and became the most talked-about artist on all social media platforms. She received the award for the Most Popular Artist of the edition and the Silver Seagull. The singer was supposed to receive the Golden Seagull, but due to a miscommunication between the event organization and the singer's team, she left the stage before "El Monstruo" could present the award to her.

Anitta and Peso Pluma performed "Bellakeo" on the main stage at Coachella 2024 during the second weekend. On 26 April, the singer released her sixth studio album, Funk Generation, her first under her new label Republic Records. All the songs from the album debuted in the Top 50 on Spotify Brazil, marking the second album by the artist to achieve this. Funk Generation charted on Apple Music in over 65 countries, making it the Brazilian album with the widest global reach. Within just three days, the album accumulated 26 million streams on Spotify Brazil, setting a record for the biggest weekly debut by a Brazilian album on the platform in 2024. Globally, the album debuted at second place on Spotify Global within four days, with notable debuts in the United States (8th place) and the United Kingdom (9th place). Anitta broke her own record by becoming the first artist to have 100 songs reach number one on iTunes Brazil. The singer also extended her record as the artist with the most songs entering the top 10 on Spotify Brazil, with a total of 49 songs achieving this feat. Additionally, Funk Generation achieved the biggest debut for a Brazilian album on the charts in Portugal.

On 2 May, Anitta was honored alongside Shonda Rhimes, Amy Schumer, and Mariska Hargitay at the Variety's Power of Women event, in recognition of her contribution to the music world and for representing the CUFA (Central Única das Favelas). On the same day, Anitta spoke as one of the delegates at Global Citizen Now. On 4 May, the singer made history as the final guest judge at the ballroom, featured in the song "Vogue", during the grand finale of Madonna's The Celebration Tour, the largest solo artist concert ever held. The event took place in Copacabana, gathering over 1.6 million people. On 18 May, the singer began her first entirely international tour to promote her sixth studio album, Funk Generation: Baile Funk Experience. The tour started in Mexico and will visit the United States, Canada, Colombia, Peru, Chile, Argentina, Germany, the Netherlands, England, France, Italy, and will end in Spain. On 24 May, Anitta appeared as a guest judge on the third episode of the ninth season of RuPaul's Drag Race All Stars, with the song "Banana" featuring Becky G being the Lip sync song.

On 25 July, Anitta received an honor at the Premios Juventud for being an activist in the defense of LGBTQIA+ rights, as well as being a defender of humanitarian causes and the protection of the Amazon rainforest. She is also an exponent of Brazilian pop and funk to the rest of the world. The singer was nominated in three categories at the 2024 MTV Video Music Awards, making her the most nominated Latin woman. She received two nominations for Best Latin for her songs "Bellakeo" and "Mil Veces", and one nomination for Best Editing for "Mil Veces".

On 6 September, Anitta performed during the halftime show of the NFL Kickoff Game for the 2024 regular season, the first ever held in South America. The singer took the stage for an audience of over 55,000 at the Neo Química Arena in São Paulo, with all tickets sold out. The performance occurred during the game between the Philadelphia Eagles and the Green Bay Packers, marking the first time in history that a Week 1 NFL game was held outside the United States. On 7 September, the singer made a surprise appearance at The Weeknd's São Paulo Concert, held at Morumbi Stadium in São Paulo. The two artists performed together the song "São Paulo", from the singer-songwriter's album, Hurry Up Tomorrow, a collaboration with her. Anitta won the Best Latin award at the MTV Video Music Awards for the third consecutive year, with her song "Mil Veces", becoming the Latin female artist with the most awards overall. With this achievement, she tied with J Balvin, both now holding the record for the most Latin wins at the awards. Additionally, Anitta performed at the ceremony for the fourth consecutive year, delivering performances of the songs "Paradise" with Fat Joe and DJ Khaled, "Alegría" with Tiago PZK, and "Savage Funk". On 12 September, Anitta was nominated for the Billboard Latin Music Awards in the Hot Latin Songs Artist of the Year, Female category. On 17 September, the singer received two Latin Grammy nominations: one in the Best Portuguese Language Urban Performance category for the song "Joga pra Lua," in collaboration with Pedro Sampaio, and another for Record of the Year with the song "Mil Vezes". Additionally, with the song "La Tóxica", in partnership with Mexican singer Alejandro Fernández, Anitta set a record by becoming the first Brazilian to top the Billboard Regional Mexican Airplay chart, after the song accumulated 6.3 million impressions on U.S. radio during the week of 6 to 12 September, earning the title of "Biggest Gainer" of the week. Anitta also stood out as the tenth solo female artist to reach the top of the chart, and as the fifth solo artist outside the regional Mexican genre to achieve this number one position.

On 30 October, Anitta and The Weeknd released the collaboration "São Paulo", a Brazilian funk track. The song debuted in the top 10 on Spotify Global, setting a new record for Anitta as the Brazilian artist with the most chart entries across multiple countries, appearing in 71 nations. "São Paulo" also achieved the biggest debut for a Brazilian act in Spotify Global history and became the largest debut by a Latin artist in 2024, surpassing Bad Bunny. This release marked the third consecutive year Anitta secured a spot in Spotify's global top 10.

At 67th Annual Grammy Awards, Funk Generation was nominated for Best Latin Pop Album, becoming the first funk album in history to be nominated for a Grammy.

On 3 December 2024, Anitta was honored with the Vanguard Trophy at the Multishow Brazilian Music Awards, the biggest music award in Brazil, in recognition of her impact and contribution to Brazilian and international music. This newly introduced category highlighted her status as the most prominent Brazilian artist on the global stage. With this achievement, Anitta also became the most awarded artist in the history of the event and the most nominated. On 31 December 2024, Anitta headlined the New Year's Eve in Copacabana, which gathered over 2.6 million people.

=== 2025–present: Equilibrium ===
On 11 January, the singer kicked off her series of shows across Brazil, titled Ensaios da Anitta.

On 1 February, Anitta reached a new milestone by placing the song "São Paulo," in collaboration with The Weeknd, in the Top 10 on Spotify in the United States, Canada, and the United Kingdom. With this, she became the Brazilian act with the highest peak on these charts. Additionally, the track stood out for being one of the few by any artist worldwide to enter the Top 10 in every country in the Americas. On 10 February, she achieved her highest peak on the Billboard Hot 100, reaching position No. 43, extending her personal record. The song also solidified Anitta's record as the Brazilian artist with the most #1s on Apple Music, in more than 28 countries. "São Paulo" remained in the Top 9 of the Apple Music Global chart, breaking and maintaining her record for the highest peak by a Brazilian act and expanding her position as the most successful Brazilian on global charts, including the UK Official Singles Chart, Finland Singles Chart, Sweden Singles Chart, Canada Hot 100, France Singles Chart, among others.

In February, Anitta also expanded her record as the Brazilian act with the most monthly listeners on Spotify. Additionally, she extended her record as the Brazilian artist with the most #1s on Spotify, reaching the top in several countries, such as Brazil, Portugal, Panama, Argentina, Uruguay, Latvia, Luxembourg, Estonia, Switzerland, and Lithuania. On 20 February, Anitta made history by becoming the first Brazilian to win an award at the Premios Lo Nuestro.

On 1 March, Anitta set a new record, achieving the highest number of streams in a single month on Spotify for a Brazilian pop artist, with 324 million streams. On 6 March, the documentary Larissa: The Other Side of Anitta premiered. In its first four days of release, the film reached 2.5 million views and totaled 1.5 million hours watched. The documentary entered the Top 3 on Netflix Brazil, topped the charts in Portugal, and reached the global Top 10 on the platform among non-English language productions during its debut week. On 8 March, Anitta held her traditional post-Carnival street party in Rio de Janeiro, attracting a crowd of 1,100,000 people.

On 22 April, the singer and entrepreneur was announced as the new ambassador for Mercado Pago, starring in a campaign at Pacaembu Stadium. On 24 April, she was honored at the Billboard Latin Women in Music event in Miami with the Vanguard Award, becoming the first artist to receive this award in that category. The award was presented by Shakira, who, in her speech, referred to Anitta as the "Queen of Funk".

On 3 September 2025, Anitta participated in The Weeknd’s After Hours til Dawn Tour at the Alamodome stadium in San Antonio, where she performed the song "São Paulo", and was later announced as a special opening act for selected dates of the tour's Latin American expansion in 2026. On 29 September, she performed at Le Défilé L'Oréal Paris, held during Paris Fashion Week, where she both walked the runway and performed her own repertoire live.

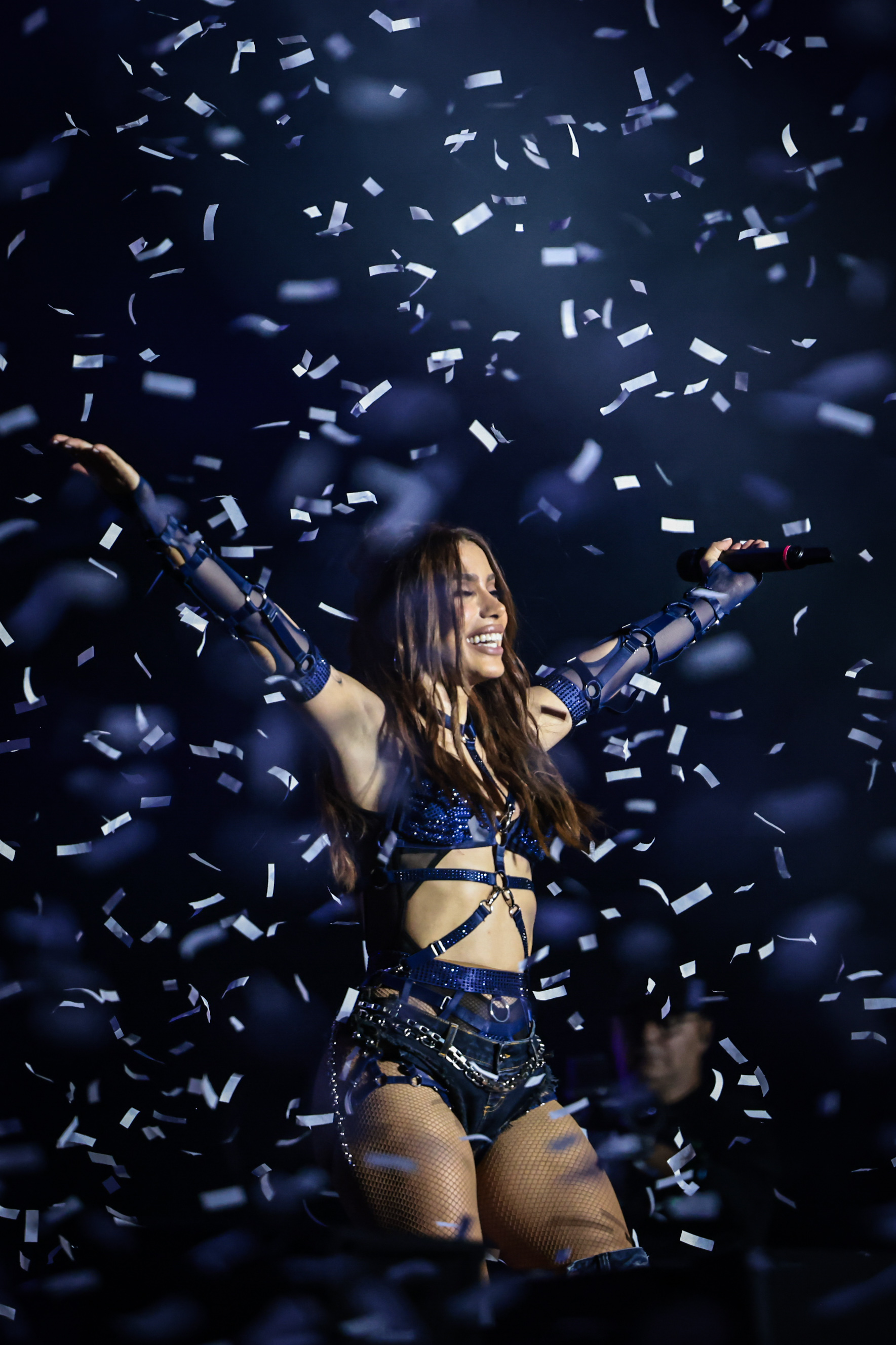
Anitta during a show in January 2026

On 1 October, Anitta attended Stella McCartney’s fashion show during Paris Fashion Week, as part of the event's official schedule. On 15 October, in London, at St James's Palace, Anitta served as co-host of the 13th Liberatum Cultural Award, a ceremony honoring Indigenous leader Chief Raoni Metuktire for his advocacy in defense of the Amazon and Indigenous peoples. The event was attended by King Charles III, as well as cultural leaders, activists, and figures from the film and diplomatic communities. During the ceremony, Raoni and Anitta performed a traditional Indigenous chant prior to the presentation of the award.

On 1 November, Anitta was one of the performers at the Global Citizen Festival: Amazônia, held in Belém, marking the first edition of the festival to take place in Latin America and aimed at mobilizing international support for the protection of the Amazon rainforest ahead of COP30. On 5 November, she participated in the Earthshot Prize, held at the Museum of Tomorrow in Rio de Janeiro, marking the first time the award ceremony was hosted in Latin America. Founded by Prince William, the prize grants £1 million to five innovative sustainability solutions. The ceremony brought together global leaders, innovators, and international artists; Anitta shared the stage with Shawn Mendes, Gilberto Gil, Seu Jorge, and Kylie Minogue, as well as Prince William himself, contributing live performances during the Gala Event.

In January 2026, Anitta launched the concert season of her project Ensaios da Anitta. In March 2026, Anitta released, La Testa Gira" that reached the top five across major music streaming platforms in Italy, while also peaking at number three on the Italian singles chart published by the Federazione Industria Musicale Italiana (FIMI).

A few weeks later, on April 9, she released "Choka Choka", a collaboration with Shakira, as the second single of her album Equilibrium. The song debuted at number one across all major streaming platforms in Brazil, while also reaching number three on the global Spotify chart and number six on the platform's Top Songs Debut Global ranking. Internationally, the track also entered charts such as the NetEase Cloud Music – New International Songs Chart, the Singapore Top International Daily New Chart, the Taiwan Top Western Daily New Singles Chart, the LINE Music World Chart, and the QQ Music Western Singles Chart. In the United States, the song reached the top five on the Billboard Latin Digital Song Sales chart and entered the top 20 of the Billboard Brasil Hot 100. She was the musical guest on the April 11, 2026 episode of Saturday Night Live. On April 16, 2026, Anitta released her album Equilibrium, which debuted at number one on Spotify's Top Albums Debut Global chart. The project also reached number nine on the Spotify Top Album Debut UK chart, entered the top 10 of the Amazon Music Best Sellers ranking, and debuted on Apple Music album charts in 43 countries. In Portugal, the album peaked at number five on the Portuguese Streaming Albums chart published by Audiogest.

Musically, Equilibrium explores a fusion of traditional and contemporary Brazilian genres, blending samba, funk carioca, axé, and reggae. The project is anchored by spiritual and introspective themes; Anitta described the record as a reflection of a personal "state of mind" aimed at promoting meditation and reflection. The album also features explicit references to Candomblé and its orixás, which the singer utilized as a platform to challenge religious intolerance in Brazil.

Equilibrium is noted for its extensive list of guest collaborators. Aside from the pre-release single "Choka Choka" featuring Colombian singer Shakira, the album includes contributions from a diverse array of Brazilian artists, including Marina Sena, Liniker, Luedji Luna, Rincon Sapiência, Melly, Ponto de Equilíbrio, Os Garotin, Ebony, Papatinho, KING Saints, and Los Brasileros. The album's visual identity and cover art were captured by the photography duo MAR+VIN, who previously collaborated with Anitta during her Girl from Rio era.

Anitta also served as the opening act for the Latin American leg of The Weeknd’s After Hours til Dawn Tour. During the concerts, the artists announced their collaborative song “Rio”. On May 2, 2026, Anitta also appeared during Shakira’s performance at the Todo Mundo no Rio event, where they performed “Choka Choka” for an audience of over two million people at Copacabana Beach.

On May 9, Anitta was confirmed as one of the performers at the opening ceremony of the 2026 FIFA World Cup in the United States, alongside artists such as Future, Katy Perry, Lisa, Rema, and Tyla.

On November 12, the singer won her first Latin Grammy in the Best Portuguese Language Contemporary Pop Album category for her album EQUILIBRIVM. At the same edition, for the first time, a Portuguese-language category was presented during the main Latin Grammy ceremony, which was televised, rather than during the pre-ceremony. On November 16, she was nominated for the 2027 Grammy Awards in the Best Global Music Album category for the same album. On November 18, she confirmed her participation in the video game Grand Theft Auto VI, in which she voices the character Dr. Nita, host of the fictional radio show Ask Dr. Nita, broadcast on the station The Wipe. Her participation also includes the song "Touch & Go", an English-language version of "Vai Dar Caô", as the show's theme song.

== Artistry ==
=== Musical style ===
Anitta's music is generally pop, funk carioca, funk melody and Latin pop, but she also incorporates R&B, dance-pop, electronic, EDM, reggae, and reggaeton. In addition to having songs in five different languages in her discography, such as Portuguese, Spanish, English, Italian and French.

=== Influences ===
Of course I have my inspirations, I love it, I grew up listening to Mariah Carey, Rihanna. I love Beyoncé with passion, who has no way, the whole of Brazil, the whole world is a fan. So we do have our references, always. And it's super important for you to have an inspiration. (...) I really enjoy looking at my divas.

— Anitta about her influences.

Anitta cited Mariah Carey as major artist influence and named her as "one of the main reasons I started singing": "She was the first introduction I had to music. With her, I understood what it was like to be a singer, what it was like to follow by a artist's album and work for so long time. It's as if she had taught me how to sing". Anitta's other major influences include Katy Perry, Beyoncé and Rihanna. She has expressed her admiration for Shakira, who she credited with opening the door for female artists of Latin Music, as well as Carmen Miranda for opening the door for Brazilian artists in global entertainment industry.

Songs and concerts by female pop artists such as the Pussycat Dolls, Madonna, and Britney Spears, often influence her work. She has expressed her admiration for Brazilian female singers Rita Lee, Marisa Monte and Ivete Sangalo.

== Public image ==
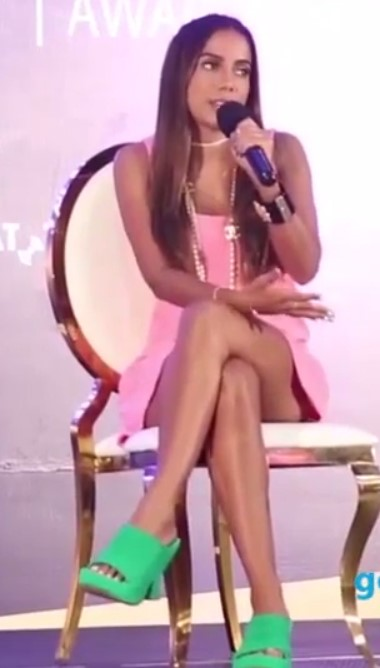
Anitta at the Coca-Cola Jeans parade in November 2014

Soon after reaching stardom, Anitta was described by the media as a sex symbol. In 2015, she was voted the sexiest woman by readers of VIP magazine. Anitta has expressed that by working "with the sensuality thing," her work is not always taken seriously by some critics and the public. She voiced her frustration, stating, "[...] people think you have no talent, no intelligence. I can be intelligent and have the desire to be sensual."

When she was selected as "Woman of the Year" by the Brazilian edition of GQ magazine in 2017, Anitta delivered a feminist speech, speaking out about the differing treatment of female artists compared to their male counterparts.

Vogue magazine listed Anitta as one of the 100 most influential and creative people in the world. She was chosen for her "positive engagement with body image," exemplified by her choice to unapologetically display her unretouched appearance in the "Vai Malandra" music video.

As one of the most influential celebrities on social media, Anitta ranked 7th in the Billboard Social 50 in June 2017, later appearing in the top 10 multiple times, including in December of the same year. In March 2018, she won the iHeart Music Awards for Social Star.

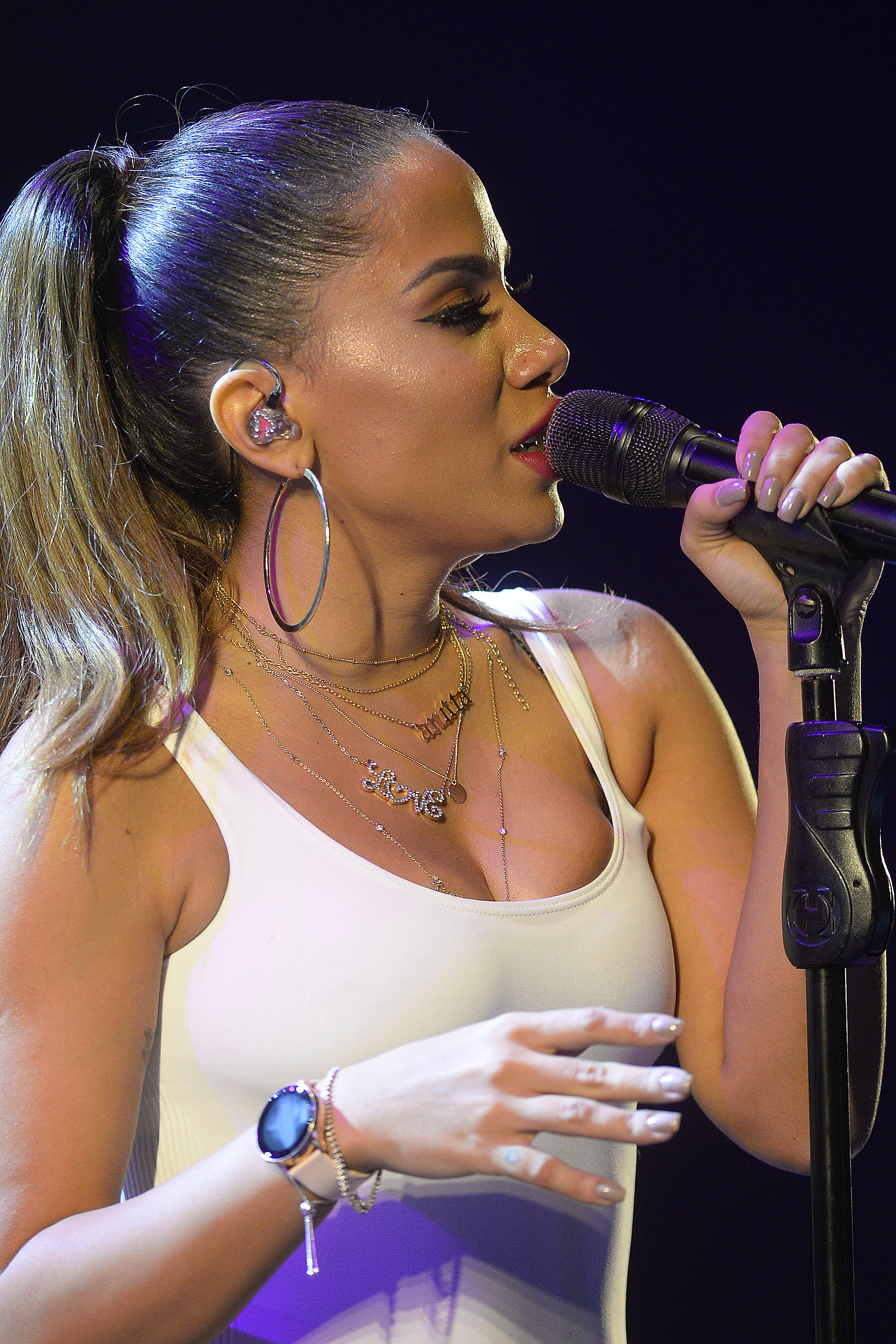
Anitta in 2015

Following her rise to fame, Anitta has associated her image with numerous brands. Often referred to as a "marketing case", Anitta views this as a compliment, stating: "I'm happy when people say that I'm a marketing case because I'm the one who handles my marketing. I studied marketing; I graduated in pre-college administration and took marketing classes. All my marketing is planned and executed by me. I feel flattered when people acknowledge that." She also described co-branding as a strategy she uses when collaborating with foreign artists to introduce her work to other markets.

Early in her career, Anitta's style featured colorful printed dresses, cropped tops, denim shorts, plaid shirts, and caps. After the release of her album Bang (2015), her style began to incorporate pop art references. She has expressed a preference for clothing from brands like Moschino and Givenchy. In an interview with EGO.com, Anitta stated, "Being stylish is having an attitude, having an uncommon sense of authenticity. To have style is to be in a good mood".

=== Anal tattoo ===
In February 2021, a video of Anitta getting a tattoo on her anus, which allegedly says "love" or "I lov you", leaked online. In May 2022, the sertanejo singer Zé Neto, part of the duo with Cristiano, made a controversial statement during a concert, claiming he didn't need resources from the Rouanet Law, nor a tattoo on his "toba" (slang for anus) to show success, in an apparent dig at Anitta. The comment sparked a conflict with the singer's fans and led to the exposure of million-dollar contracts for Zé Neto and other sertanejo artists for shows in small towns, triggering the opening of the "CPI dos Sertanejos," an investigation into the use of public funds for these events. In addition to the duo Zé Neto & Cristiano, the investigations involved actions from the Public Prosecutor's Office in Mato Grosso and 24 of the 26 municipalities under suspicion, as well as controversies involving Gusttavo Lima, one of Brazil's highest-paid artists and a staunch supporter of Jair Bolsonaro, who promised to end the "mamata" of the Rouanet cultural incentive law.

The crisis in the sertanejo world intensified when the Public Prosecutor's Office opened inquiries to investigate the origins of the exorbitant contracts. Gusttavo Lima was the first target, after his fee of R$800,000 for a performance in São Luiz, Roraima, was disclosed. In another instance, the singer faced criticism again when it was revealed that he would receive R$1.2 million from the municipal government of Conceição do Mato Dentro, Minas Gerais, funds allegedly meant for the health and education sectors. Due to the negative fallout, the municipality canceled the performances of Gusttavo Lima and the duo Bruno & Marrone, stating that the traditional 30th Cavalcade of the Jubilee of Lord Bom Jesus de Matosinhos was being embroiled in a "political and party war".

With so many allegations and the exposure of public contracts, Gusttavo Lima turned to Instagram on the night of 30 May 2022, to go live and try to explain himself. During the live video, he cried and vented, stating that he was not a "criminal" and lamented being the target of investigations. During the broadcast, Zé Neto left supportive comments, saying, "Who needs to explain themselves is me, brother. I'm going through a rough phase, I'm your brother. You don't need to explain yourself, just pass it to me. It has nothing to do with you".

Later, Zé Neto apologized to Anitta for his criticisms about the singer's intimate tattoo, admitting that he was wrong to make the comment. "I was going through a very tumultuous moment, and today I sincerely say that I didn't need to say that. I'm speaking from the heart as a request for forgiveness for any possible wrong comment I made," declared the singer.

The controversy gained international attention, being featured in an article by the American magazine Billboard on 9 June 2022. In April 2023, rappers MC Daniel and Nog released a song titled "* da Anitta," which, despite its provocative title, was received with good humor by the singer herself.

== Legacy and impact ==
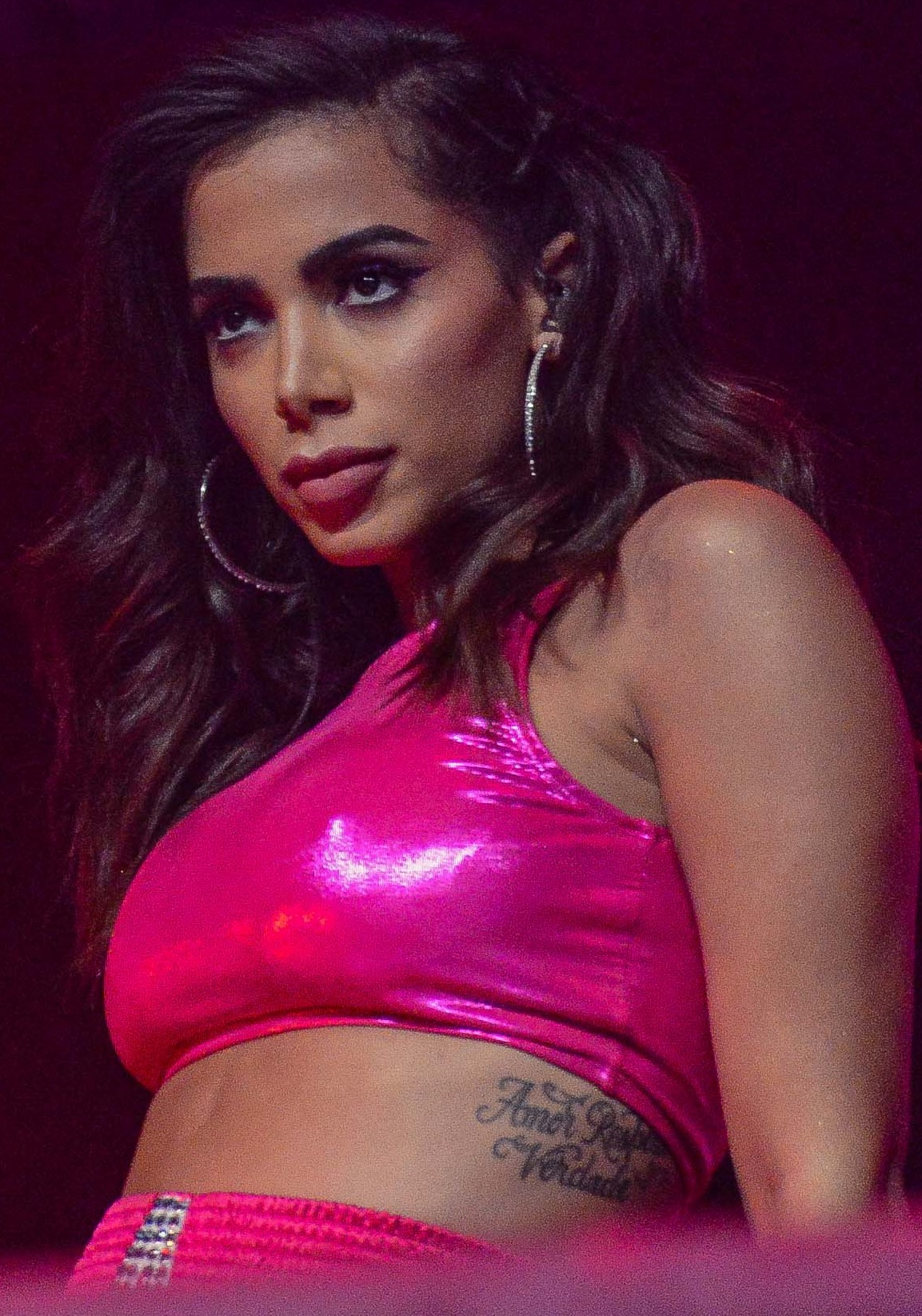
Anitta at the 'Combatchy' party in 2017

Anitta is one of the biggest pop stars in Brazil in recent years and the Brazilian artist with the greatest international exposure, referenced by several magazines, websites, and by the Grammys as the Queen of Brazilian Pop. Additionally, she has become one of the most acclaimed Latin artists. In 2018, she was elected by Billboard as the 7th most influential artist in the world on the Billboard Social 50 list, which ranks the 50 most influential artists on social media. In 2022, she received a recognition award for her cultural impact and for being the ambassador of Brazilian music at WSJ. Magazine.

She is often cited as the leading name in Brazilian funk and pop, being recognized as the exponent of the rhythm worldwide. Billboard credits her with prompting the Latin Grammys to update their understanding of urban music and to include Brazilian funk for the first time among the genres that comprise this concept. In March 2023, the Latin Recording Academy of the Latin Grammy Awards announced changes and additions to categories in the awards ceremony, including the Best Portuguese-Language Urban Performance. This new category acknowledges the growth of urban music in Portuguese and the importance of the Brazilian and Portuguese music markets to the global music industry. According to Variety and other magazines, Anitta played a key role in advocating for the inclusion of this new category in the awards ceremony, stating, "[...] With the addition of the Best Portuguese-Language Urban Performance category, the Academy is responding to the rise of music in Brazil and Portugal, where artists like Anitta have gained global recognition. [...]".

In addition to her musical achievements, the singer became the third most influential personality in politics in Brazil in 2022, following former president Jair Bolsonaro and influencer Felipe Neto. Several news outlets report that Anitta played a key role in pressuring politicians regarding votes on issues involving the environment, culture, racism and homophobia, directly opposing Jair Bolsonaro. Along with other artists, she supported the rival candidate of former President Bolsonaro, Lula. Anitta's advocacy was particularly evident when she encouraged young people aged 16 to 18 to obtain their electoral documents. This initiative attracted more than 2 million teenagers, and the youth enlistment campaign, along with the regularization of electoral titles, led the Superior Electoral Court to register a record of over 8.5 million requests for assistance regarding electoral status.

In 2021, she was elected one of the most influential personalities in the world by Time, joining the Time 100 Next list, which highlights emerging names globally. In 2022, Forbes included her in their 30 Under 30 North America list, recognizing her as one of the leaders of the next generation of Latin American music. She is also considered one of the biggest influences on modern marketing in Brazil's recent history.

Anitta was highlighted in Bloomberg Línea's list of the 500 most influential people in Latin America in 2024, recognized for her ability to generate jobs and make investments that have boosted significant economic activities, showcasing her influence across various sectors.

In 2024, a survey conducted by the Preply platform highlighted Anitta as the second most consumed Brazilian artist in Portugal, behind only Ivete Sangalo, who was mentioned by 9.4% of respondents. The study revealed that 96% of participants stated they regularly listen to Brazilian music, with Anitta being cited by 6%. Additionally, 61.8% of residents in the country reported having attended concerts by Brazilian artists, with Anitta and Luan Santana among the most prominent, and 15.4% of those attendees said they had attended more than one show.

Many recording artists have cited Anitta as an influence, including Tini, Christina Aguilera, Katy Perry, Dua Lipa, Kenia Os, Karol G, J Balvin, Becky G, Natti Natasha, Alicia Keys, Pabllo Vittar, Maluma, Cardi B, David Carreira, Alok, António Zambujo, Lizzo, Camila Cabello, Diogo Piçarra, Bruna Marquezine, Luísa Sonza, Luan Santana, Ana Castela, Rita Ora, Jão, Gloria Groove, Marina Sena, Juliette, L7nnon, Pedro Sampaio, Kevinho, Matuê, Kevin O Chris, Marília Mendonça, Mc Cabelinho, Emilio Osorio, Clara Buarque, Giulia Be, Flay, Mallu, Gretchen, and Mica Condé.

== Business and ventures ==
=== Products and advertisements ===
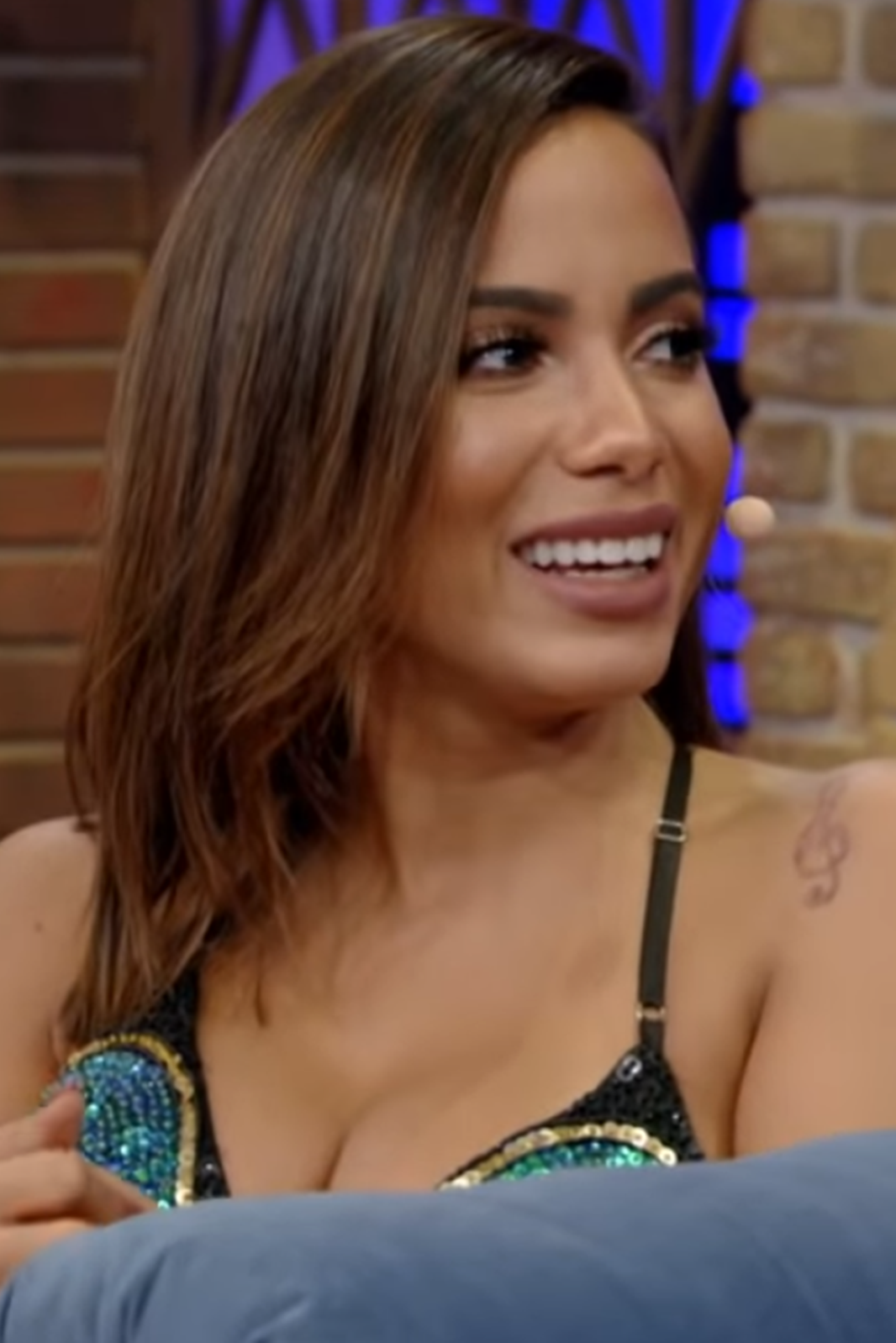
Anitta at Multishow in 2018

In addition to being a poster girl, ambassador, Anitta is sponsored and has already made commercials for different brands, including Savage Fenty, Adidas, Samsung, Shein, Burger King, Elma Chips, Cheetos, Lay's, Rexona, Tinder, Skol, Nubank, Claro, Bacardi, Estácio, Renault, C&A, iFood, Pepsi, Magazine Luiza, Target, Cadiveu, The Sims, Free Fire, Facebook Gaming, Brizza Arezzo, Sol de Janeiro, Hope, Tiffany & Co, Mercado Pago, among other brands.

In 2014, Anitta founded the Rodamoinho group, a holding company for music and entertainment with offices in Rio de Janeiro and Los Angeles. The holding has the companies, "Rodamoinho Entretenimento" which is specifically aimed at the production and realization of concerts, events and tours. "Rodamoinho Records" is a company dedicated to the music industry as a whole, which in addition to being a label and publisher, also carries out a survey of catalogs, registration of works, release and distribution of singles, EPs and albums, management and organization of the musical collection and commercial negotiation of use and synchronization. "Rodamoinho Filmes" is an audiovisual production company, responsible for the production, execution, and delivery of videoclips, lives, and films. Who is also responsible for the idealization and executive production of the cartoon based on the life of the singer, "Clube da Anittinha". And "Floresta Music & Touring" which is a company dedicated to the management and international publishing of Brazilian artists.

In September 2019, the singer became Head of Creativity and Innovation at Skol Beats, a brand of Ambev, one of the largest breweries in the world. Anitta has been active in the discussion of marketing strategy, business and innovations. The contract provides for the launch of an authorial product per year. Anitta launched, together with the antiperspirant brand Rexona, a new product line "Rexona by Anitta" in 2019. In November 2022, the singer now became the face of all Rexona 72h campaigns.

On 16 January 2021, the singer signed a partnership with the vegan product brand, Cadiveu Essentials, a repair line, which has five products for a hair care routine. Anitta, in addition to becoming the brand's poster girl, co-created the Vegan Repair products alongside the brand's product development team.

On 21 June 2021, Anitta was announced as a member of the board of directors of neobank Nubank, the largest fintech bank in Latin America, in addition to participating in the quarterly meetings with the company's board of directors to assist in strategic decisions about the future and improvement of the services offered by fintech to the most vulnerable classes. According to information from executives in interviews, the singer played a key role in convincing the board of the importance of listing the company on the Brazilian stock exchange, B3, along with the planned IPO in the United States. In addition to supporting the idea of the company offering free stock receipts, BDR, to its customer base. With this initiative, fintech gained more than 7.5 million partners. In August 2022, due to the growth of the singer's schedule, due to her global expansion, Anitta requested that her participation in the board not be renewed. She then became a global brand ambassador, as part of Nubank's marketing, the singer participated in Nubank's campaign as a sponsor of the 2022 World Cup.

On 23 May 2022, together with the educational institution Estácio, the singer launched the online course "Anitta Prepara", a course aimed at the area of entrepreneurship. Anitta provides mentoring and is supported by a team of professors from the higher education institution, all of whom specialize in entrepreneurship and innovation. On 26 May, the singer was announced as a partner of the Brazilian foodtech focused on plant-based meats, Fazenda Futuro (or Future Farm, its brand in the U.S.). Anitta participates in the company's business management, in addition to working on innovation projects that will help the brand to spread the consumption of meat made from plants in Brazil and in other countries.

As a co-creator and in partnership with the pharmaceutical company Cimed, Anitta launched on 28 July 2022, the brand "Puzzy By Anitta", which is an intimate perfume without gender, with several fragrances inspired by the singer. The intimate perfume, dermatologically and gynecologically tested, approved by Anvisa, registered more than 400,000 units sold and the forecast is to close the first semester with a turnover of 50 million reais. The company also made the product available for international sale in the United States and Latin America, in addition to the promise to make it available in Europe, making "Puzzy by Anitta" the first Cimed product to be sold outside Brazil.

== Personal life ==
Anitta is bisexual and identifies as part of the LGBTQ+ community. She dated Mr. Thug, the lead vocalist of Bonde da Stronda, from early 2011 until the end of 2012. The singer also had a relationship with her dancer Ohana Lefundes, with the doctor Pamela Tosatti and with the actor and model Pablo Morais. On 17 November 2017, she married businessman Thiago Magalhães, with whom she had been in contact since May of the same year. The couple married under separation of property. They announced their divorce in September 2018. She has had brief relationships with Pedro Scooby, Gabriel David, television host Gui Araújo, and Canadian record producer Murda Beatz. Maluma stated in an interview that he and Anitta had a romance and loved each other very much, but because they were in the same career, the relationship didn't move forward. "[...] It doesn't work for me to be in relationships with people from the industry. When it happened, with Anitta actually, she was just starting her (international) career. I met her and we really liked each other and all that. I thought to myself: 'I can't be with her, because she does the same thing as me.' [...]". In July 2023, the Italian actor Simone Susinna appeared alongside the singer in Europe, confirming their romantic relationship.

In an interview for Trip magazine in 2017, she stated that if she did not pursue her artistic career, she would "be a happy psychologist".

In January 2019, after watching the documentary Cowspiracy (2014), she started transitioning to veganism. In May 2019, she said was not vegan anymore. PETA named her one of the Most Beautiful Vegan Celebrities of 2022, along with singer-songwriter Lenny Kravitz.

Anitta follows Candomblé.

=== Philanthropy and advocacy ===
Anitta is an environmental activist, vocally advocating against the crimes committed in the Amazon rainforest and supporting the rights of its indigenous population. During the 2018 Brazilian elections, she publicly joined the #EleNão (#NotHim) campaign, opposing presidential candidate Jair Bolsonaro. She also advocates for climate change, conservation, the environment, the right to food and health. She has already made several donations to NGOs, charities and needy communities, including donations to combat poverty in favelas, fires in the Amazon and to the non-governmental organization "Zuzu for Africa", which takes care of African children; the money was used to purchase a property and transform it into a dental and medical center for needy families and children in Africa.

As part of the LGBTQ community, Anitta defends the rights of people in the community, including the non-interference of religion in civil rights, such as domestic partnership and marriage. To the magazine Gay Times, she, who is bisexual, stated that part of the media pretends not to know or ignores her sexual orientation out of prejudice.

In 2025 Trans Visibility Day, Anitta expressed she admires transgender people, saying 'One day in the life of a free person, who loves themselves, respects themselves, accepts themselves as they are, is worth more than 100 years in the life of a person who points the finger at others.', citing The Buddha.

Anitta has taken a stand in defense of women's rights on several occasions, such as in demonstrations against bills that criminalize abortion and in encouraging women to vote.

2017 Multishow Brazilian Music Awards presented her shows featuring people with disabilities and plus size models as her dancers. A dancer with Down syndrome said 'I loved it'. In 2019, she also announced Makayla Sabino, a trans ballarina, for Rock in Rio. Sabino eventually starred in a docuseries transmitted by Globoplay.

== Discography ==
Studio albums

- Anitta (2013)
- Ritmo Perfeito (2014)
- Bang! (2015)
- Kisses (2019)
- Versions of Me (2022)
- Funk Generation (2024)
- Equilibrium (2026)
- Equilibrium II (2026)

== Tours ==
=== Headlining ===
- Turnê Show das Poderosas (2013–2014)
- Turnê Meu Lugar (2014–2016)
- Bang Tour (2016–2017)
- Kisses Tour (2019–2020)
- Baile Funk Experience (2024–2025)
- Equilibrium Tour (2026)

=== Promotional ===
- Chá da Anitta (2013–2016)
- Show das Poderosinhas (2015–2019)
- Turnê Os Caras do Momento (with Nego do Borel) (2015–2016)
- Made in Brazil (2018)
- Euro Summer Tour 2022 (2022)

=== Carnival Parade ===
- Bloco da Anitta (2016–2020 and 2023–present)
- Ensaios da Anitta (2019–present)

=== Supporting act ===
- After Hours til Dawn Tour (2026)

== Filmography ==
This is a chronologically ordered list of films, series and television shows in which Anitta has appeared.

=== Films ===
| Title | Year | Role | Ref. |
|---|---|---|---|
| Copa de Elite | 2014 | Helena Boccato | |
| Didi e o Segredo dos Anjos | 2014 | Goddess Soláris | |
| Breaking Through | 2015 | Herself | |
| Meus 15 Anos | 2017 | Herself | |
| Minha Vida em Marte | 2018 | Herself | |
| Hitpig! | 2024 | Letícia dos Anjos | |

=== Television ===
| Title | Year | Role(s) | Channel | Notes | Ref. |
|---|---|---|---|---|---|
| Amor à Vida | 2013 | Herself | TV Globo | Episode: "December 12, 2013" | |
| Sai do Chão | 2014 | Host | TV Globo | Episode: "January 19, 2014" | |
| Dança dos Famosos | 2014 | Participant | TV Globo | Season 11 | |
| Vai Que Cola | 2014 | Anitta (fictional version) | Multishow | Episode: "As Poderosas"; Episode: "Ausência de Anitta" | |
| Alto Astral | 2015 | Herself | TV Globo | Episode: "May 4, 2015" | |
| Osmar the First Slice of the Loaf | 2015 | Pãonitta | Gloob | A parody of herself that appeared in the episode: "Show das Pãoderosas" | |
| Tomara que Caia | 2015 | Policial Pereira | TV Globo | Episode: "July 19, 2015" | |
| TVZ | 2015–18 | Special Host | Multishow | Episode: "October 9, 2015"; Episode: "January 14, 2016"; Episode: "October 31, 2016"; Episode: "October 12, 2018" | |
| Música Boa Ao Vivo | 2016–17 | Third Season Host | Multishow | Season 3–4 | |
| Chacrinha, o Eterno Guerreiro | 2017 | Herself | Canal Viva | Special of 100 years of Chacrinha | |
| The Tonight Show Starring Jimmy Fallon | 2017 | Herself | NBC | Musical Guest: "May 25, 2017" | |
| Adnight Show | 2017 | Herself | TV Globo | Episode: "December 14, 2017" | |
| Anitta Entrou no Grupo | 2018–19 | Host | Multishow | | |
| La Voz... México | 2018 | Coach | Las Estrellas | Season 7 | |
| Clube da Anittinha | 2018–2021 | Anittinha | Gloob | Original voice | |
| Vai Anitta | 2018 | Herself | Netflix | Docuserie | |
| Amor de Mãe | 2020 | Sabrina | TV Globo | Episodes: "82, 83, 84 & 85" | |
| Anitta Dentro da Casinha | 2020 | Host | Multishow | | |
| The Late Late Show with James Corden | 2020 | Herself | CBS | Musical Guest: "August 20, 2020" | |
| Anitta: Made in Honório | 2020 | Herself | Netflix | Docuseries | |
| The Tonight Show Starring Jimmy Fallon | 2020 | Herself | NBC | Musical Guest: "September 23, 2020" | |
| Ilhados com Beats | 2021 | Herself | IGTV | Reality show | |
| Punk'd | 2021 | Herself | The Roku Channel | Anitta Doctor! With Anitta | |
| Today Show | 2021 | Herself | NBC | Musical Guest: "May 03, 2021" | |
| Jimmy Kimmel Live! | 2021 | Herself | ABC | Musical Guest: "May 05, 2021" | |
| 12 Hours With | 2021 | Herself | Facebook Watch | Episode: "Inside Anitta's Mission to Bring Brazil to the World" | |
| Miley's New Year's Eve Party | 2021 | Herself | NBC | Performer:" 31 December 2021 | |
| Domingão | 2022 | Herself | TV Globo | Guest: "January 16, 2022" | |
| The Tonight Show Starring Jimmy Fallon | 2022 | Herself | NBC | Guest: "January 31, 2022" | |
| The Late Show with Stephen Colbert | 2022 | Herself | CBS | Guest: "April 07, 2022" | |
| Watch What Happens Live with Andy Cohen | 2022 | Herself | Bravo | Guest: "April 10, 2022" | |
| Good Morning America | 2022 | Herself | ABC | Musical Guest: "April 15, 2022" | |
| The Kelly Clarkson Show | 2022 | Herself | NBC | Guest: "April 10, 2022" | |
| Legendary | 2022 | Guest Judge | HBO Max | Season 3, Episode 3 | |
| Carpool Karaoke: The Series | 2022 | Herself | Apple TV+ | Season 5, Episode 3 | |
| Quotidien | 2022 | Herself | TF1 | Guest: "June 25, 2022" | |
| Caldeirão | 2022 | Herself | TV Globo | Guest: "September 17, 2022" | |
| La Resistencia | 2022 | Herself | Movistar+ | Guest: "November 07, 2022" | |
| Savage x Fenty Show Vol.4 | 2022 | Herself | Amazon Prime Video | Performer | |
| Latin Grammy Awards | 2022 | Host | Univision | The 23rd Annual Latin Grammy Awards | |
| Amazon Music Live | 2022 | Herself | Amazon Prime Video | Performer | |
| Big Brother Brasil 23 | 2023 | Herself | TV Globo | Performer | |
| El Gordo y la Flaca | 2023 | Herself | Univision | Guest: "June 23, 2023" | |
| Que História É Essa, Porchat? | 2023 | Herself | GNT – Globoplay | Guest: "July 4, 2023" | |
| Watch What Happens Live with Andy Cohen | 2023 | Herself | Bravo | Guest: "July 11, 2023" | |
| Élite | 2023 | Jessica | Netflix | Episode: S7 E2 "Protocolo" Episode: S7 E3 "Bling-Bling" Episode: S7 E5 "La familia" Episode: S7 E8 "Voy a acabar con esto para siempre" | |
| The Voice | 2024 | Herself | NBC | Performer | |
| RuPaul's Drag Race All Stars | 2024 | Herself | VH1 – Paramount+ | Guest Judge: "May 24, 2024" | |
| The Today Show – Citi Concert Series | 2024 | Herself | NBC | Guest and Performer: "May 31, 2024" | |
| A Great Day with J Balvin | 2024 | Herself | Peacock | Episode: “Dancing Trauma Away with Anitta” | |
| Big Brother Brasil 25 | 2025 | Herself | TV Globo | Performer | |
| Larissa: The Other Side of Anitta | 2025 | Herself | Netflix | Documentary film | |
| Today with Jenna & Friends | 2025 | Herself | NBC | Guest: "March 13, 2025" | |
| Watch What Happens Live with Andy Cohen | 2025 | Herself | Bravo | Guest: "March 13, 2025" | |
| Saturday Night Live | 2026 | Herself | NBC | Performer | |

== Awards and nominations ==
Anitta has been nominated for numerous important awards throughout her career, in Brazil, throughout Latin America, North America, Europe, Asia and Africa, receiving over 760 nominations and winning over 300 awards. Among them are nominations for the biggest music awards such as the Grammy Awards, Latin Grammy Awards, Brazilian Music Awards, American Music Awards, Latin American Music Awards, MTV Video Music Awards, MTV Europe Music Awards, MTV Millennial Awards, MTV Millennial Awards Brazil, All Africa Music Awards, NRJ Music Awards, Billboard Latin Music Awards, ASCAP Award, People's Choice Awards, WSJ. Magazine's Innovator Awards, APCA Trophy, GLAAD Media Award, Heat Latin Music Awards, iHeartRadio Music Awards, Latin Music Italian Awards, LOS40 Music Awards, Melhores do Ano, Meus Prêmios Nick, Multishow Brazilian Music Awards, Nickelodeon Kids' Choice Awards, Premios Juventud, Lo Nuestro Awards, Teen Choice Awards, Premios Tu Música Urbano, among others.

Anitta joined the list of the 50 most awarded musicians in the world of all time, according to The Artist Museum portal. This list is compiled by the portal, which tallies and gathers the awards received by artists throughout their careers, up to the present date.

Anitta is one of the Brazilian/Latin singers with the most awards and nominations in the world, being the first Brazilian and Latin artist to win and be nominated for several of these awards.

== See also ==
- List of Afro-Latinos
