= K2L Entertainment =

- Native name: K2L
- Company type: Public
- Industry: Entertainment; Production
- Genre: Trot; Pop; Dance; Electropop; R&B
- Founded: 14 February 1995
- Founder: Kamilla Fialho
- Headquarters: Rio de Janeiro, Brazil
- Area served: Worldwide
- Services: Entertainment; Production

K2L Entertainment is a Brazilian artistic entertainment company, founded by Brazil music mogul Kamilla Fialho. that has known famous singer Anitta, Lexa, Tília Fialho and Valesca Popozuda

== History ==
The company started with older artists like Valesca Popozuda and MC Sapão, and among the currently best known to Lexa singer who was one of the best bets of the company.

=== Recording artists ===
Groups

- Banda Fuze
- 3030

Double

- Bruninho & Davi

Soloists

- Anitta
- Valesca Popozuda
- MC Sapão
- Lexa
- MC Rebecca
- MC Kevin O Chris
- Tília
- Casali
