= CloudWalk (company) =

Brazilian financial technology company

- Type: Private limited company
- Founded: 2013; 13 years ago
- Founder: Luis Silva
- Headquarters: São Paulo, Brazil
- Area served: Brazil and the United States
- Products: Digital accounts; Card machines; Credit; E-commerce payments
- Brands: InfinitePay, Jim.com
- Revenue: R$ 2.7 billion (2024)
- Number of employees: 720 (2025)
- Website: cloudwalk.io

CloudWalk is a Brazilian financial technology company based in São Paulo. It is considered a unicorn. The company operates primarily in Brazil through the financial services platform InfinitePay, launched in 2019, and internationally through the payment app JIM.com, aimed at the North American market.

As of 2025, CloudWalk had US$1.2 billion in annualized revenue and US$128 million in annualized net income. In the first half of 2025, the company generated US$404 million in net revenue and US$39 million in net income. The revenue per employee jumped from $796,000 in July 2024 to $1.7 million in July 2025, almost doubling in a single year, up from $40,000 per employee in 2020.

== History ==
CloudWalk was founded in 2013 by Luis Silva at the height of the so-called "machine war". In 2019, it launched its main platform in Brazil, InfinitePay.

In November 2021, CloudWalk raised US$150 million in a Series C funding round led by Coatue Management, with participation from DST Global, A-Star Capital, The Hive Brazil, Plug and Play Tech Center, Valor Capital Group, and angel investors Gokul Rajaram, Larry Fitzgerald, and Kelvin Beachum. The round increased the company’s valuation to US$2.15 billion. Its main venture capital investors include Coatue, DST Global, and Valor Capital.

In 2023, the company was Apple’s first chosen partner in Brazil for the launch of Tap to Pay on iPhone. The company’s international expansion began in 2024 with the launch of the JIM.com brand in the United States, focused on entrepreneurs in cities such as New York, Austin, and San Francisco.

== Operations and products ==
CloudWalk has developed an ecosystem of financial solutions. Its main platform, InfinitePay, includes a digital account, credit card, e-commerce tools, payment links, billing management, and credit provision for small and medium-sized businesses. The company uses its own digital security system based on artificial intelligence and machine learning. In 2025, it received the Fraud Prevention Seal from the National Confederation of Financial Institutions (CNF).

== Regulation ==
The company operates under the Central Bank of Brazil's regulations and holds a payment institution license issued in 2022. In 2025, it received authorization to operate as a Credit, Finance, and Investment Company (SCFI).

== Recognition ==
In 2025, it was included in Bloomberg Línea’s list of “10 Brazilian startups to watch.” The previous year, the company was listed by CB Insights among the 250 most promising fintechs in the world, recognized by Forbes Brasil as one of the most innovative startups in the country, and won the Mastercard Excellence Program award.

Its founder and CEO, Luis Silva, has also received individual recognition. In 2024, he was named by Bloomberg Línea to its lists of the “500 Most Influential People in Latin America” and the “100 Most Innovative in Latin America.”
