= Larissa: The Other Side of Anitta =

- Portuguese: Larissa: O Outro Lado de Anitta
- Directed by: João Wainer; Pedro Cantelmo
- Written by: Maria Ribeiro
- Produced by: Felipe Britto; Melanie Chapaval Lebensztajn
- Starring: Anitta
- Narrated by: Pedro Cantelmo
- Production company: Ginga Pictures
- Distributed by: Netflix
- Release date: March 6, 2025
- Running time: 100 minutes
- Country: Brazil
- Languages: Portuguese; English

Larissa: The Other Side of Anitta is a Brazilian documentary produced by Ginga Pictures and distributed by Netflix, which premiered on March 6, 2025, on the streaming platform. Directed by João Wainer and Pedro Cantelmo, with a script by Maria Ribeiro, the film offers an intimate and unprecedented look into the life of Larissa de Macedo Machado, the woman behind the international pop star Anitta.

== Plot ==
The documentary explores the different layers of Anitta, showcasing not only the bold and powerful artist who conquered the world, but also the challenges, dilemmas, and vulnerabilities of Larissa de Macedo Machado. The narrative is driven by the perspective of an old teenage crush of Larissa, who now takes on the mission of helping to uncover her true essence. In addition to the artist's personal side, the documentary also celebrates iconic moments of her career, such as: behind the scenes of Rio de Janeiro's Carnival, achievements at international award shows, reaching the top of global charts with the song "Envolver", her historic performance at the Coachella festival.

== Cast ==
- Anitta
- Pedro Cantelmo
- Mauro Machado
- Miriam Macedo
- Renan Macedo
- Pedro Sampaio
- Lele Pons
- Rebeca León

== Reception and viewership ==
After its premiere on March 6, 2025, the documentary achieved 2.5 million views within the first four days, totaling 1.5 million hours watched during that period. The film debuted in the Top 3 on Netflix Brazil, secured the top spot in Portugal, and entered the global Top 10 for non-English language films during its premiere week.
