= Blake Farber =

American music video director (born 1985)

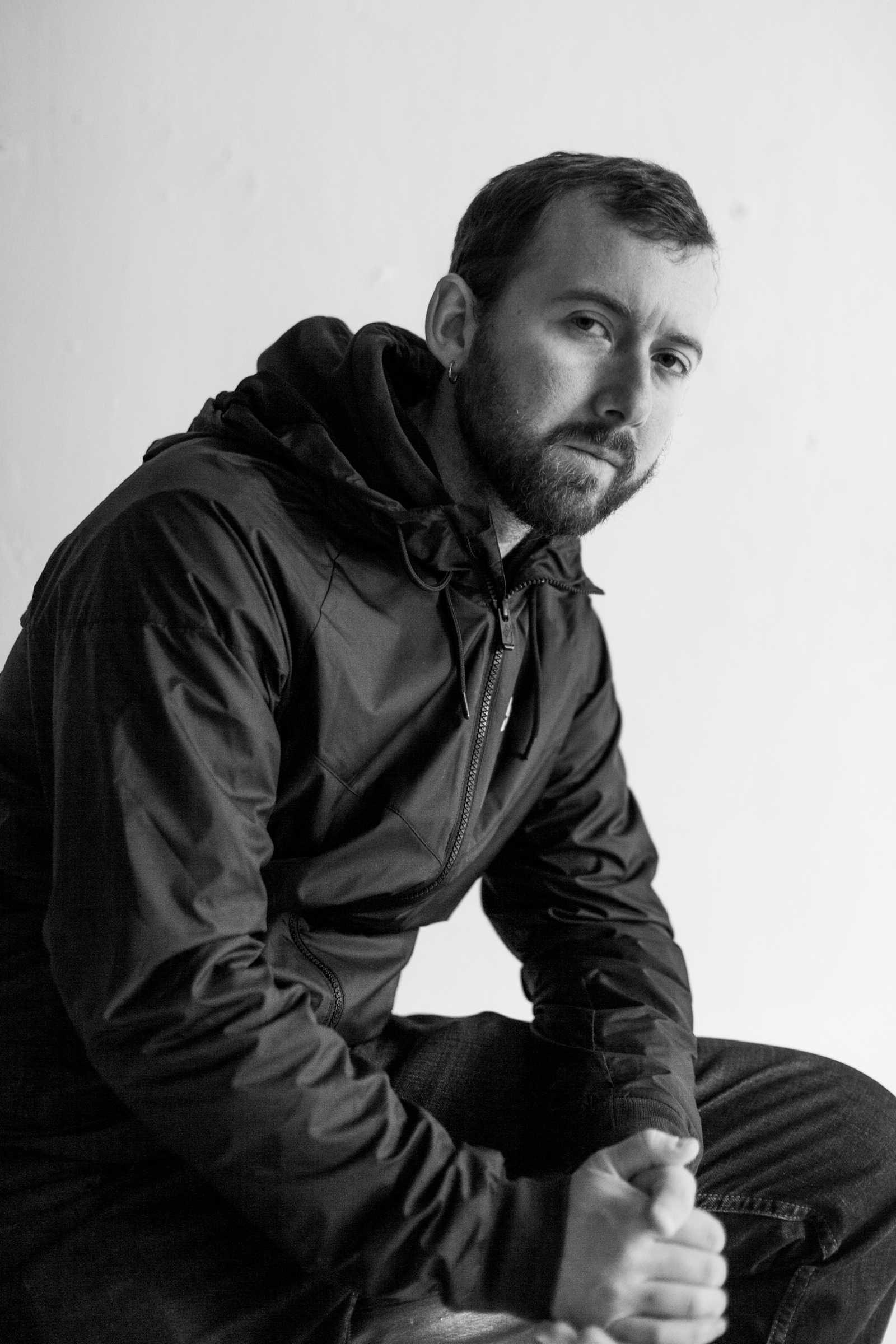
- Born: June 26, 1985 (age 41); New York City
- Occupation: Film Director

Blake Farber (born June 26, 1985) is an American director and filmmaker who is most known for his unique brand films, and music videos, which boast his signature style of storytelling and dynamic visual language. Having worked on over 40 commercials, he is widely known as a prolific global director in the advertising industry. He has enjoyed multiple nominations for VEVO Video of the Year and an MTV VMA.

His most notable works include internationally successful music videos for artists such as Beyonce and Emis Killa. His filmography can be seen on blakefarber.com, his official website.

Blake is currently in development of his debut feature film, Bluehorn.

== Early life ==
Farber was born in New York City on June 26, 1985, to Robert Farber and Judith Farber both proficient fine-art photographers in the industry. He played guitar for the Punk Rock band Olde York where they released a number of albums and world tours. Something from being a musician/photographer where he realised early that his passion was filmmaking. After, Farber turned to freelance work as a director.

An avid traveler, he divides his time between his homes in New York City and São Paulo, Brazil.

== Career ==
Farber began his directing career at the age of 16 where he created many noteworthy music videos and commercials. He has since individually directed for brands such as Nike, Apple, Pepsi, Guinness, Olympics, Toyota, etc. to name a few.

As of 2026, he is now writing and developing his first feature film, Bluehorn.

== Filmography ==
=== Music videos ===
Beyonce - Countdown (Ghost Co-Director) (2011)

Anitta - Meiga e Abusada (2013)

Dropkick Murphys - Out of Our Heads (2013)

Emis Killa - Maracana (2014)

Ozonna - Wonderland (2015)

=== Commercials ===
Olympics - Together (Brazil Director) (2016)

Betano - Craiova (2017)

Kotex - Fly (2018)

Oppo - Realme (2018)

Roadhouse - A Place Like No Other (2018)

3 - Big City Waltz (2018)

Changi - Millionaire (2019)

3 - No Fear (2019)

Oppo - Good Mornin’ (2019)

Milo - Dreams (2019)

Bold - Australia (2019)

Fincantieri - Impossible (2019)

Reebok - Energy (2019)

Nike - So Quiet (2019)

Guinness - Rise Up (2020)

Pepsi - Discover (2020)

Toyota - Mirai (2021)

Noor - The Light (2021)

ThreeSixty - Back 2 Life (2021)

Apple Watch - STB (2022)

Sun Sand & Sports - The Game (2022)

KCB - Go Ahead (2022)

Pepsi - Brazil World Cup (2022)

Red Bull - Trust Your Energy (2022)

Kenya Airways - Asante Rewards (2023)

EA Sports FC - Tactical (2023)

Samsung - Level S (2023)

Juventos - Black & White Day (2023)

Hyundai - IONIQ (2024)

TIM - You Can Do It All (2025)

Azul - O Ceu Do Brasil (2025)

Llaollao (2025)

Chime x MLS (2026)
