= Osmar: The Heel of the Loaf =

Television series

- Genre: Comedy; Slapstick
- Created by: Ale McHaddo
- Country of origin: Brazil
- Original language: Portuguese
- No. of seasons: 2
- No. of episodes: 52

Production
- Production companies: Globosat; 44 Toons

Original release
- Network: Gloob
- Release: November 18, 2013

Osmar: The Heel of the Loaf (Portuguese: Osmar, a Primeira Fatia do Pão de Forma) is a Brazilian animated television series. Was produced by 44 Toons in association with the TV channel Gloob, and created by Ale McHaddo.

The main character was originally created in a comic that was published in a children's magazine in 1993, the character was also adapted in a computer game in the late of 90s and also in a awarded short animated film in 2008.

The show originally premiered on November 18, 2013 by the children's channel Gloob and in the same year was renewed for a second season.

== Plot ==
The series is set in a universe inhabited by anthropomorphic bakery foods, in the city Trigueirópolis (a pun with wheat in Portuguese). The main character Osmar is an unlucky slice of sandwich bread, rejected and humiliated by everybody. Osmar lives in an apartment with his best friend Steve, a lazy wannabe bread who is jobless and lives at Osmar's expense. Other characters in the series include the grumpy apartment manager Seu Max, Osmar's neighbor and love interest Josie, Osmar's corrupt boss Seu Benny, and Osmar's friends Lucy and Bob.
