= Alexandre Birman =

Brazilian shoe designer

Alexandre Birman (born October 1, 1976) is a Brazilian footwear designer and founder of his self-titled couture brand, "Alexandre Birman". He is known for his trademark use of exotic skins such snakeskin, crocodile, lizard and ostrich. In November 2009, Alexandre Birman was awarded the Vivian Infantino Emerging Talent Award by industry publication Footwear News.

Alexandre Birman collaborated with designer Prabal Gurung for the debut of his fall collection during the Mercedes-Benz Fashion Week 2010.

His shoes were mentioned in the Gossip Girl episode "The Grandfather: Part II".
