= Robert Farber (photographer) =

American photographer and lecturer

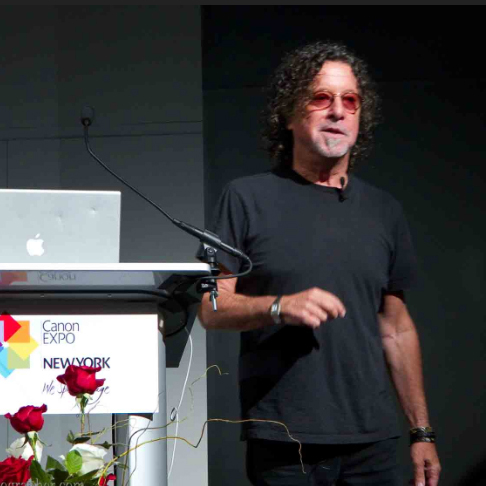
- Occupation: Photographer
- Years active: 1975–present
- Known for: Nudes, fashion, still life, landscapes

Robert Farber is an American photographer and lecturer known for his work with nudes, fashion, landscapes and still lives. He has published eleven books of original collections, four of them revised into later editions. He continues to exhibit classic and new work worldwide.

== Early life ==
Farber was born on February 29, 1944 Leap Year day, in Newark, New Jersey and grew up in Maplewood-South Orange. He was interested in art from an early age and his mother, a painter, encouraged him to make his own "art studio" in the basement where he worked in oils, drawings and watercolors. He later attended the University of Miami to study marketing and business. While in school Farber kept his ambition to one day work in the arts and described how he was initially inspired to take up photography:

"One day I was walking on Miami Beach and saw a very large woman wearing the tiniest string bikini I had ever seen, sitting on the beach, knitting. I thought to myself, 'I wish I had a camera.' I suddenly saw photography as a way to capture a moment for storytelling. I kept this thought in my mind, and after college I bought my first camera, a Petri 35mm SLR. I was not a technical person, I often made mistakes like color shifts and grainy pictures. But I realized the mistakes made my photographs look a lot like paintings."

== Career ==
In 1970 Farber moved to New York City and began experimenting with photography. He entered his early photographs into outdoor art shows around Manhattan in the "graphics" category because photography was not widely recognized as a legitimate art form in the late 1960s and early 1970s. At one show a woman approached him and asked if his entries were paintings or photographs and he replied that yes, they were indeed photographs. She revealed herself to be the show's director and informed him that photography was not allowed and he would have to leave immediately. "She actually stood there while I packed up everything and took it away," he recalled in an interview with the magazine Photographer's Forum.

At a different show he was approached by the creative director from a major advertising agency who was taken by his painterly style of an interior image, and said to him, "If you can capture that mood placing a model in that environment with that lighting, I will commission you to do a fashion ad." This led to his first national ad with Cotton, Inc. and further assignments that jumpstarted Farber's career in fashion and commercial work.

=== 1970s and 80s ===
Farber's first book Images of Woman, published in 1976, was a series of delicate, painterly, and sensual female nudes in naturally-lit interiors and impressionistic landscapes that outlined an aesthetic vision that evolved in parallel with his fashion/commercial career. The book caught the eyes of publishers, advertising art directors and gallerists that led to new commercial assignments and fine art exhibitions. When working with more erotic publications, such as Playboy and Penthouse, Farber often chose to publish under different names so as not to affect his growing reputation as a fine art photographer.

In the late 1970s and throughout the 1980s he was shooting with major fashion clients such as Bloomingdales, Saks Fifth Avenue, Macy's, Bill Blass, Anne Taylor, Christian Dior, Geoffrey Beene, Loden Frey, L'Oreal, Gillette, Revlon, Wrangler, ABC, Paramount Pictures, amongst others; with magazines GQ, Vogue, Elle, Esquire, Playboy, Viva, Cosmopolitan, and Vanity Fair; and with top supermodels Beverly Johnson, Gia Carangi, Linda Evangelista, Carol Alt, Christie Brinkley, Janice Dickinson, and Iman.

Farber's experiences in fashion resulted in the publication of his next two books, Professional Fashion Photography (1978) and The Fashion Photographer (1982). Both explored the creative process by going behind the scenes at fashion shoots and documenting how to work with clients. These large format books served Farber well, helping to escalate his reputation in fashion photography as well as enable him to publish an atmospheric collection of new works, Moods (1980), his first book to combine still lives, landscapes, and nudes.

In the early 1980s Farber was approached by musicians and video producers to adapt his visual style to motion pictures. In 1985 he directed his first music video, "Rumours of You" by Aldo Nova that led to his own experiments with long-form film. He went on to direct national and international television commercials for clients such as Wrangler, Toyota, Loden Frey, and Neutrogena, and later signed with The Gersh Agency.

His fifth book Farber Nudes (1983) attracted the eyes of Doubleday senior editor and former first lady Jacqueline Kennedy Onassis. She arranged a meeting to discuss a potential collaboration and Farber showed her recent photographs he had taken around the French Riviera that included many seaside images. Mrs. Onassis was entranced by them and said, "Let's call the book ‘By The Sea’ and add images from various parts of the world." The book exhibited a unique concept: Farber asked colleagues and friends what their feelings were to be by the sea and their thoughts were published in their own hand writing adjacent to his photographs. A wide range of people were asked, from a commercial clam digger to famous celebrities. First published in 1987, then revised for paperback in 1994, ‘’By The Sea’’ went on to win the Art Director's Award for Color Photography with designer Larry Vigon.

Throughout the 1980s, seventy-three of Farber's images were published into posters and distributed worldwide.

=== 1990s and 2000s ===
While still shooting commercially and publishing a retrospective Classic Farber Nudes: Twenty Years of Photography in 1991, Farber became aware of the newly emerging Internet as both a unique marketing tool for his photography and purchased the URL, Farber.com, and became one of the first major photographers to display his work online. Within the following year an unusual opportunity emerged as the Internet grew in popularity: people began to email him creative, technical, and business questions about his work. This led him to create a unique way to engage with other photographers — an online “photo workshop” in a virtual reality environment. The concept featured a 3-D interactive gallery tour where visitors could go into different rooms and look through his various collections and have their questions answered.

In 1996 he launched PhotoWorkshop.com with web designer Daniel Leighton. The site's content was aimed to attract serious amateurs and professionals alike with an expanded gallery tour to include workshops and tutorials taught by Farber himself as well as his recorded interviews with other prominent photographers. Users were able to digitally meet in chat rooms and discuss their own work and experiences, as well as post their own photos. It became the most visited photography education website on the Internet (and later was Canon's official education site), and by 2007 was receiving 50,000 unique visitors day, with 185,000 registered users.

In addition to his online teaching presence Farber toured extensively throughout the United States and internationally giving lectures at the Smithsonian Institution, the George Eastman House and many universities, as well as seminars and on-location workshops with models. Education about the craft and profession has always been an integral aspect of Farber's professional life. In his books during this period Natural Beauty (2001) and American Mood (2004) he includes a technical glossary of the locations, camera, film speeds and processing for each photograph, a consistent theme throughout his literary oeuvre. When describing his teaching methods with the magazines Photo Insider and the British Journal of Photography he also emphasizes the unique perspective of every photographer: “I like sharing how I do my work. [But] even in the exact same settings, no two pictures turn out identically. All photographs reflect the photographer, the technical is just one side." And further in his introduction to Natural Beauty:

“Of course, many powerful images are technically perfect, but that is not what makes them great. If the viewer is taken in by a perfect exposure, then the image lacks what is most important: the soul of its creator. All this translates as sensitivity: sensitivity to the subject, whether it be human or otherwise. A spark in the eyes is not merely a reflection of light, just as a tear is more than a drop of water. You have to feel your subject in the same way that a dancer has to feel the music.”

=== 2010 to current ===
In recent years Farber's work has been featured in art fairs as well as international solo gallery and museum exhibitions. In 2013 Farber was the subject of solo-retrospective show "Journey Through Moods" at the Museum of Modern Art in Dubrovnik, Croatia, featuring images of all genres taken throughout his 40-year career. In December 2013 he was a featured photographer for Canon at the Art Miami fair. In 2016, the publisher 21st Editions collaborated with Farber on a fine art book entitled Colour. It compares the chemically degenerative effects of film positives discovered in Farber's archives with Johann Wolfgang von Goethe's Theory of Colours, and premiered at the AIPAD photography show in New York and participated in the Frieze VIP program. Since 2016 his Deterioration Series has been exhibited in Brussels, Paris, New York, Florence and Miami. In May 2017, Farber released a collection of provocative nudes spanning over 30 years entitled "UNSEEN / Midnight Studio" at WhiteBox NYC.

== Style ==
"Alone on a Hill", Images of Woman book, 1976

"Empire Diner", Bloomingdales Vintage Fashion, 1979

Farber has been described as a master of the nude and the "romantic mood." His visual sensibilities were influenced by "the directional light of the Dutch- and Flemish-school painters, and also by the soft focus of some impressionist painters." His early female nudes and still lives were often shot in locations in nature and pay direct homage to the Old Masters’ sense of color and texture while also employing his own custom filtering techniques. The "Farber" look is often characterized by discreet, elegant and architectural compositions of the female form and described as sensual, romantic, painterly, and moody while employing soft focus and grainy film texture. Farber now primarily shoots digitally, often achieving a filmic, grainy texture through digital film ‘noise’. His look is established with the camera and avoids Photoshop digital manipulation.

=== Solo exhibitions ===
- 1972: Newark Library, Newark, NJ
- 1976: Nikon House, New York, NY
- 1976: 11 E. 57th St. "Color photographs of landscapes and still lives" New York, NY
- 1978: 11 E. 57th St. "Color prints after the Old Masters" New York, NY
- 1979: Images Gallery of Contemporary Photography, New York, NY
- 1980: Dyansen Gallery, New York, NY
- 1981: Gallery One, San Francisco, CA
- 1994: Hankyu Gallery, Tokyo, Japan
- 2000: Cornell Museum, Delray Beach, FL
- 2001: Duggal Gallery, New York, NY
- 2001: Modern Books "Natural Beauty: Farber Nudes" Palo Alto, NY
- 2002: Artspace Gallery, Calgary, Canada
- 2004: Timothy Yarger Fine Art "Natural Beauty: Farber Nudes" Beverly Hills, CA
- 2005: Kensington-Lott Fine Art, Grand Cayman, British West Indies
- 2006: Timothy Yarger Fine Art "Romantic Moods" Beverly Hills, CA
- 2008: HW Gallery, Naples, FL
- 2009: Gallery 27 Brooks Institute, Santa Barbara, CA
- 2011: Frost Art Museum "My Eyes Have Seen" Miami, FL
- 2011: Artisan Works "Perspectives" Rochester, NY
- 2011: BEL'RP "BEL'ART" Paris, France
- 2013: Altamira Fine Art Gallery "American Moods" Jackson Hole, WY
- 2013: Dubrovnick Museum of Modern Art "Journey Through Moods: Robert Farber Photographs" Dubrovnick, Croatia
- 2013: Borgo San Marco "Mostra Fotografica" Puglia, Italy
- 2014: Gallery 3w57 "Farberesque: From Pensive to Provocative" New York, NY
- 2015: Galeria Trópica "Classic Fashion" Rio de Janeiro, Brazil
- 2017: Holden Luntz "Under the bright lights: fashionable moments" Palm Beach, FL
- 2017: WhiteBox "UNSEEN / Midnight Studio" New York, NY
- 2017: CUBE "European Preview: The Deterioration Series" Brussels, Belgium
- 2017: Jacob Javits "Capturing Beauty" New York, NY
- 2017: Galerie Mark Hatchem "Provocative Moods" Paris, France
- 2018: GWS Wickbold Gallery "40 Anos de Fotografía" São Paulo, Brazil
- 2018: Space15Twenty "From Sensitive to Sensuous" Los Angeles, CA
- 2018: Eduardo Secci Contemporary "Transformation" Florence, Italy
- 2022: Christopher Martin Gallery "Women As Art" (online) Aspen, Dallas
- 2022: Cavalier Gallery, "Women as Art” (online) Palm Beach, New York, Nantucket, Greenwich
- 2022: IFAC "Women as Art” (online) Athens, Greece
- 2023: The Selects Gallery “Gia" New York, NY
- 2023: Echo Fine Art "50 years of Evolving Vision" Cannes, France
- 2023: IFAC "Midnight Studio: Behind the Veil" Artsy (online)
- 2024: Bailey Art Gallery "Taste of 50 Years" Jupiter Island, Florida
- 2024: Fornaciai Art Gallery "Women As Art" Florence, Italy
- 2025: Vero Beach Museum of Art "Timeless: Robert Farber's Fashion Photography" Vero Beach, Florida

=== Books ===
- Images of Women – Amphoto, 1976 (revised in 1979). ISBN 0-8174-2483-0
- Professional Fashion Photography – Amphoto 1978 (revised in 1983).
- Moods – Amphoto, 1980. ISBN 0-8174-4900-0
- The Fashion Photographer – Amphoto, 1981 (revised in 1984). ISBN 0-8174-3852-1
- Farber Nudes – Amphoto, 1983. ISBN 0-8174-3851-3
- By The Sea – Melrose Square, 1987 (revised in 1994). ISBN 0-8174-3648-0
- Classic Farber Nudes: 20 Years of Photography – Amphoto, 1991. ISBN 0-8174-3670-7
- Natural Beauty: Farber Nudes – Merrell, 2001. ISBN 1-8589-4136-9
- American Mood – Merrell, 2004. ISBN 1-8589-4263-2
- Nuesto Mexico/Our Mexico – Limited edition of 100, 2011.
- Colour – 21st Editions, Limited edition of 18, 2017.

=== Collections ===
- Contemporary American Erotic Photography Melrose LA, 1984. ISBN 0-3945-4248-7
- How to Photograph Women Dixons World of Photography, 1984.
- Graphis Nudes: Issue No. 1 Graphis, Inc., 1993. ISBN 0-8230-6969-9
- NUDES 2" (Graphis Nudes) (v. 2) Graphis, Inc., 1997. ISBN 1-8880-0130-5
- Curve: The Female Nude Now Universe, 2003. ISBN 0-7893-0871-1
- The World's Top Photographers: Nudes Rotovision, 2005, 2007. ISBN 2-88046-823-X
- Paris Photo by Karl Lagerfeld Steidl, 2017. ISBN 978-3-95829-354-0

=== Awards ===
- 1988 – Art Director's Award for Color Photography – By The Sea
- 1987 – Photographer of the Year – PMA (Photographic Manufacturers Association)
- 1995 – International Award – American Society of Photographers, Professional Photography Association
