= Preply =

Educational platform

- Screenshot of the Preply homepage (2025)
- Company type: Private
- Website type: Educational
- Available in: English, French, German, Italian, Polish, Russian, Spanish, Ukrainian
- Traded as: Preply Inc.
- Headquarters: Brookline, Massachusetts, United States
- Country of origin: Ukraine
- Area served: Worldwide
- Founders: Serge Lukianov, Kirill Bigai, Dmytro Voloshyn
- CEO: Kirill Bigai
- Industry: Language learning
- Services: Education service
- Employees: 500+
- Website: preply.com
- Launched: November 1, 2012; 13 years ago
- Current status: Active
- Native clients on: iOS and Android

Preply (/ˈprɛpli/ PREP-lee) is a multinational online language learning platform headquartered in the United States that combines human tutoring with artificial intelligence-powered study assistance. The company connects learners with tutors for live, one-on-one lessons, accessible via its website and mobile app, using a recommendation algorithm to match students and teachers.

Preply was founded in 2012 by Ukrainian entrepreneurs Serge Lukianov, Kirill Bigai, and Dmytro Voloshyn. As of 2024, Preply employed nearly 700 people of over 50 nationalities, with offices in Barcelona, London, New York, and Kyiv, and users across more than 190 countries.

== History ==
Preply was founded in 2012 by Ukrainian entrepreneurs Serge Lukianov, Kirill Bigai, and Dmytro Voloshyn. Together they developed the first version of preply.com, which was launched in November 2012. On August 31, 2013, Preply received an angel investment of $180,000. Some of the named investors in the funding round were Semyon Dukach, Borya Shakhnovich, Vadim Yasinovsky, Dan Pasko, Torben Majgaard and Vostok Ventures. Preply's first expansion took place in its founding year, when it began expanding into the markets of other countries of Eastern Europe, including Belarus, Kazakhstan, Poland and Russia. It was influenced by Bigai’s experience studying English online with a tutor, which he thought was more flexible and cost-effective. In the summer of 2012, the founders launched Preply as an online marketplace for live, personalized language learning. The company sought to differentiate itself from traditional language learning methods by focusing on real-time interaction and individualized instruction.

In its first three years, Preply experienced a notable growth in both employee headcount and financial performance. In 2016, the employee count reached 100, marking a seven-fold increase in less than three years. In June 2016, Preply raised $1.3 million in funding from investors including Techstars, SMRK VCDigital and Arthur Kosten and the Preply platform was updated with a new ranking algorithm based on machine learning and used for classifying and recommending tutors. At the time, the company did not operate its own videoconferencing technology; instead, lessons were conducted through third-party platforms such as Skype.

Preply Classroom, formerly known as Preply Space, was launched as the all-in-one language ecosystem. Classroom provided integrated video, online chat, screen sharing and other useful features. The company also closed another round of funding during the same year. In 2019, Preply entered the Spanish market and opened an office in Barcelona, then expanded further in European, including the United Kingdom and Germany. It also launched its B2B division, known as Preply Business. This followed growing demand in the sector from companies seeking tailored language training solutions that could be used by their employees. In March 2020, Preply saw record daily hours booked and spikes in tutor registrations in the United States, United Kingdom, Germany, France, Italy and Spain during early COVID‑19 pandemic school closures.

In May 2020, Preply won "The Revenue Hack of 2020" at the Ukrainian Startup Awards. By March 2021, Preply had facilitated more than 10 million lessons and listed about 40,000 tutors across 190 countries, and had raised a cumulative $50.6 million over eight funding rounds. At the time, it employed about 250 people and operated offices in Kyiv and Barcelona.

Preply raised its largest single amount to date of $50 million via a funding round in July 2022.> In July 2023, the company raised an additional $70 million via an extended Series C funding round, which was led by Horizon Capital. Funds were to be used for an artificial intelligence-based assistant focused on grammar explanations and conversation starters. Preply opened an office in New York City in October 2023. The company opened an office in London in July 2024. In January 2026, the company raised $150 million in a Series D round at a $1.2 billion valuation, making it a unicorn.

After the 2022 Russian invasion of Ukraine, Preply organized support initiatives for Ukraine including a message of support projected onto the Warsaw Spire building in Warsaw, Poland, free language lessons for approximately 1,000 displaced Ukrainians adapting to new countries, and relocation for employees in Ukraine. In 2025, the company launched the "Speak Ukraine" campaign, a multimedia initiative aimed at promoting Ukrainian language and culture.

== Services ==
Preply operates on a subscription model. It has more than 100,000 human tutors and offers over 90 languages, as of 2026. In addition to language learning, the site includes tutors for other subjects such as math and computer science. A machine-learning algorithm matches students and tutors based on factors such as budget and schedule. Preply uses artificial intelligence on its platform with an AI teaching assistant for support with lessons and AI analytics for measuring student performance. Preply also offers a corporate language training program known as Preply Business.
