= Girl from Rio =

Girl from Rio may refer to:

- The Girl from Rio (1927 film), a film directed by Tom Terriss
- Girl from Rio (1939 film), a film directed by Lambert Hillyer
- The Girl from Rio (1969 film), a film directed by Jess Franco
- Girl from Rio (2001 film), a film directed by Christopher Monger
- "Girl from Rio" (song), a 2021 song by Anitta

== See also ==
- The Girl from Ipanema
