= MC Sapão =

Brazilian singer-songwriter (1978–2019)

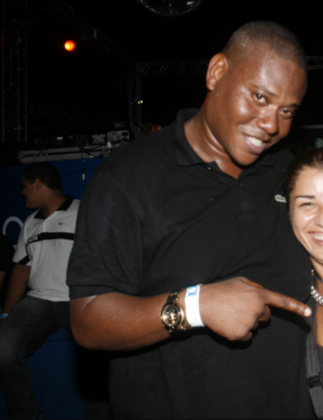
- Sapão with a fan in 2010
- Born: Jefferson Fernandes Luiz; November 12, 1978; Rio de Janeiro, Brazil
- Died: April 19, 2019 (aged 40); Rio de Janeiro, Brazil
- Resting place: Cemitério da Penitência, Rio de Janeiro, Brazil
- Occupation: Singer-songwriter
- Years active: 2005–2019
- Children: 4
- Musical career
- Genres: Funk carioca, funk ostentação, melodic funk, hip hop, pop, dance, trap music
- Instrument: Vocals
- Label: Som Livre

Jefferson Fernandes Luiz (November 12, 1978 – April 19, 2019), known professionally as MC Sapão or simply as Sapão, was a Brazilian singer-songwriter who reached fame in the mid-2000s with the hits "Diretoria" and "Eu Tô Tranquilão".

== Biography ==
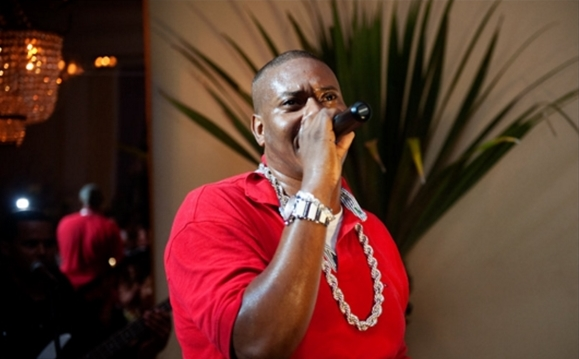
Sapão performing in 2010

Jefferson Fernandes Luiz was born on November 12, 1978, at the Alemão favela complex in Rio de Janeiro. His nickname, "Sapão" (roughly translated to English as "big frog"), which he had since he was young, came from his portly figure and bulging eyes, which gave him the appearance of a frog. He worked at a tire shop, as a doorman for a daycare and as a delivery boy for a flower shop – and later for a restaurant – prior to his musical career. In 1998 he was arrested by the police due to alleged drug trafficking, being released after eight months due to lack of evidence; while in prison he wrote his first song, "Eu Sei Cantar", which he dedicated to his mother, promising her he would "use his talents for good" after being released. (In 2006, however, another controversy between Sapão and the police ensued after he allegedly took part in a proibidão funk by MC Colibri, also arrested under suspicions of drug trafficking and condoning crime.)

Sapão then continued to write songs but only began his career officially in 2005, recording the song "Diretoria", which catapulted him into fame after extensive airplay in radio stations of Rio de Janeiro. The following year he released his greatest hit, "Eu Tô Tranquilão", and he subsequently began to appear in DJ Marlboro-produced compilations and performing in shows nationwide. By the 2010s, collaborations with DJ Tom and sertanejo universitário duo João Neto & Frederico also ensued.

In 2012 he released the song "Rei do Baile", which was re-recorded in 2015 featuring guest appearances by Mr. Catra and MC Guimê. A music video was made for the song, with a budget of R$200,000.00.

In 2013 his song "Classe A" was included in the soundtrack of the 21st season of long-running soap opera Malhação.

Sapão was also notable for performing at wedding parties, with his most remarkable one being at the marriage of actors Bruno Gagliasso and Giovanna Ewbank in 2010.

=== Health issues and death ===
Sapão always had health issues owing to his obesity – he weighed 352 pounds (160 kg) at his heaviest –; diagnosed with type 2 diabetes, in 2013 he was forced to lose 110 pounds (50 kg), claiming he would "die" if he did not do so.

On April 10, 2019, he was hospitalized due to a severe case of pneumonia, dying nine days later, on April 19, at the age of 40. He was buried one day later at the Cemitério da Penitência in Caju, Rio, and was survived by his wife Alessandra Fernandes and four children – Pedro, Kevin, Odara and Brisa.

His scheduled performance at Rock in Rio 8 was subsequently cancelled.

== Influences ==
Sapão stated in a 2015 interview that his musical style was mostly influenced by American funk, soul and pop artists such as Michael Jackson, Stevie Wonder, Ray Charles and Lionel Richie.

== Discography ==
=== Compilations ===
Year	Album
2006	Funk Mix: Label: Som Livre; Format: CD; Contributed with the song "Boladão (Grito de um Guerreiro)"

=== Singles ===
Year	Single	Album
2005	"Diretoria"	Non-album song
2006	"Eu Tô Tranquilão"	Non-album song
2006	"Boladão (Grito de um Guerreiro)"	Funk Mix
2013	"Mocinho e Bandido" (feat. João Neto & Frederico)	Non-album song
2013	"Classe A"	Malhação Nacional 2013
2014	"Vou Desafiar Você"	Non-album song
2015	"A Resenha" (feat. DJ Tom)	Non-album song
2015	"Rei do Baile" (feat. Mr. Catra and MC Guimê)	Non-album song
