= Bloomberg Línea =

Latin American digital business news platform

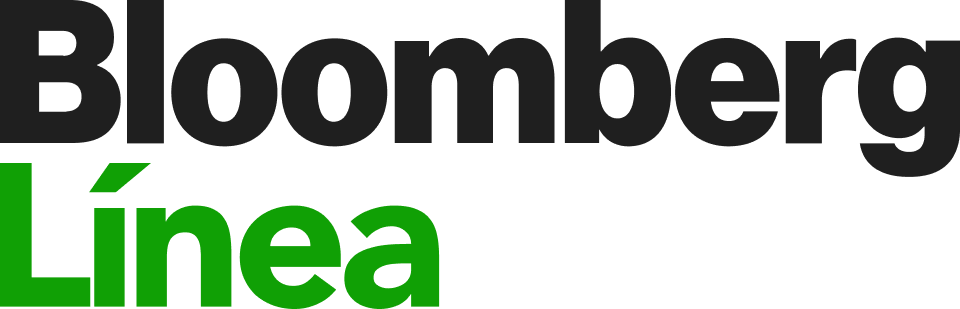
- Website type: Business news
- Available in: Spanish, Portuguese, English
- Key people: Kaio Philipe, Leon Falic, M. Scott Havens
- Website: https://www.bloomberglinea.com
- Commercial: Yes
- Launched: August 10, 2021
- Current status: Active

Bloomberg Línea is a digital business news platform launched on August 10, 2021, through a partnership between Bloomberg Media and Falic Media. The platform publishes content in Spanish, Portuguese, and English across Latin America and the Caribbean.

== History ==
The platform was developed to connect Latin American business news during a period of increased digital news consumption. Bloomberg Línea was co-founded by M. Scott Havens (former Bloomberg Media CEO), Kaio Philipe (former Bloomberg L.P. executive), and Leon Falic (CEO of Duty Free Americas and Falic Media). The platform was announced in April 2021 as part of Bloomberg Media's expansion into Latin American markets. It launched during the COVID-19 pandemic with 70 journalists across the region. The launch included websites in nine countries: Argentina, Brazil, Chile, Colombia, Mexico, Panama, Peru, Uruguay, and Venezuela.

== Market Performance ==
Bloomberg Línea's reporting has been cited by international publications including the Financial Times and the Wall Street Journal.

In 2023, Bloomberg Línea was ranked second in Brazil's Digital Finance Influencer Ranking by ANBIMA (Brazilian Association of Financial and Capital Market Entities). The platform was named "Publisher of the Year" by the Digiday en Español Awards in 2023. According to the International News Media Association (INMA), Bloomberg Línea reached over 550,000 digital subscribers across 16 countries within eight months of launch.

== Content Approach ==
The news platform combines original reporting from regional journalists with translated content from Bloomberg News. It uses multiple distribution channels including social media platforms, with focus on TikTok content aimed at Generation Z investors.

The company recruited veteran executives from major regional publications during the COVID-19 pandemic. Regional media outlets analyzed Bloomberg Línea's content management approach.

== Publications ==
Bloomberg Línea publishes an annual list of 500 influential people in Latin America. The list has been cited by media outlets including El Tiempo, Semana, La Nación, and Newsweek Español.

The platform has produced investigations into illegal fishing in Panama, fertilizer crises affecting agricultural sectors, and lithium industry developments across the region.

== See also ==
- Bloomberg News
- Bloomberg L.P.
- Business journalism
- Digital journalism
