= Castelar (disambiguation) =

Castelar is city in Buenos Aires Province, Argentina. Castelar may also refer to:

== People ==
- Armando Castelar (born 1955), Brazilian economist
- Emilio Castelar (1832-1899), Spanish republican politician, and a president of the First Spanish Republic

== Buildings ==
- Casa de Castelar, settlement house in Los Angeles, California, U.S.
- Hotel Castelar, hotel in Buenos Aires, Argentina

== Other ==
- 2013 Castelar rail accident, Argentine rail disaster
- Castelar e Nelson Dantas no País dos Generais, 2007 Brazilian documentary film
- Castelar Park, located in Badajoz, Extremadura, Spain
- Monument to Castelar (Madrid), public art in Madrid, Spain

== See also ==
- Castela (disambiguation)
- Castellar (disambiguation)
- Castelão (disambiguation)
