= Castellar =

Castellar may refer to the places below or to the Castellar typeface.

== France ==
- Castellar, Alpes-Maritimes, a commune in the Département of Alpes-Maritimes, Provence-Alpes-Côte d'Azur
- Castellare-di-Casinca, a commune in the Haute-Corse department on the island of Corsica
- Castellare-di-Mercurio, a commune in the Haute-Corse department of France on the island of Corsica

== Italy ==
- Castellar, Piedmont, a former comune in the province of Cuneo
- Castellar Guidobono, a comune in the province of Alessandria, Piedmont

== Spain ==
- Castellar, Aguilar de Segarra, a singular population entity in Aguilar de Segarra, Catalonia
- Castellar, Jaén, a municipality in the province of Jaén, Andalusia
- Castellar de la Frontera, a municipality in the province of Cádiz, Andalusia
- Castellar de la Muela, a municipality in the province of Guadalajara, Castile-La Mancha
- Castellar de la Ribera, a municipality in the province of Lleida, Catalonia
- Castellar de n'Hug, a municipality in the province of Barcelona, Catalonia
- Castellar de Santiago, a municipality in the province of Ciudad Real, Castile-La Mancha
- Castellar del Riu, a municipality in the province of Barcelona, Catalonia
- Castellar del Vallès, a municipality in the province of Barcelona, Catalonia
- El Castellar, a municipality in the province of Teruel, Aragon

== See also ==
- Castelar, a city in Morón Partido, Buenos Aires Province, Argentina
