= Timeline of Badajoz =

The following is a timeline of the history of the city of Badajoz, Spain.

== Prior to 20th century ==
- 1031 – Badaljoz becomes capital of the Moorish Taifa of Badajoz.
- 1168 – Portuguese in power.
- 1169 – Torre de Espantaperros (tower) built in the Alcazaba of Badajoz.
- 1169 – Siege of Badajoz by the Portuguese, led by King Afonso I of Portugal.
- 1229 – Alfonso IX of León in power.
- 1230 – Roman Catholic diocese of Badajoz established.
- 1270 – Badajoz Cathedral consecrated.
- 1460 – Puente de Palmas (bridge) built.
- 1509 – Birth of Luis de Morales, became a painter.
- 1563 – Iglesia de Santo Domingo (church) built.^{(es)}
- 1597 – Puente de Palmas (bridge) repaired.
- 1658 – Siege of Badajoz (1658) by Portuguese forces.
- 1705 – Besieged by the Allies in the War of the Spanish Succession.
- 1767 – Birth of Manuel de Godoy, duke of Alcúdia, became First Secretary of State of Spain twice.
- 1811
  - 19 February: Battle of the Gebora fought near Badajoz.
  - April–June: Second Siege of Badajoz (1811) by Portuguese and British forces.
- 1812 – March–April: Siege of Badajoz (1812) by Portuguese and British forces.
- 1833
  - Sociedad Económica de Amigos del País de Badajoz established.
  - Puente de Palmas (bridge) re-built.
- 1839 – Cementerio de San Juan (Badajoz) (cemetery) established.
- 1842 – Population: 11,715.
- 1862 – El Avisador de Badajoz newspaper begins publication.
- 1863 – Badajoz Railway Station begins operating.
- 1867 – Museo Arqueológico Provincial (Badajoz) (museum) established.
- 1889 – Caja de Badajoz (bank) founded.
- 1899 – Mercado Metálico (market) built on the Plaza Alta (Badajoz).
- 1900 – Population: 30,899.

== 20th century ==
- 1903 – Castelar Park established.
- 1920 – Museo de Bellas Artes de Badajoz (museum) opens.
- 1933 – Hoy-Diario de Extremadura newspaper begins publication.
- 1936
  - 14 August: Battle of Badajoz (1936).
  - August: Massacre of Badajoz.
- 1940 – Population: 55,869.
- 1944 – Archivo Histórico Provincial de Badajoz (archives) established.
- 1970 – Population: 101,710.
- 1973 – University of Extremadura established.
- 1990 – Badajoz Airport terminal opens.
- 1994 – Puente Real (bridge) built.
- 1995 – Museo Extremeño e Iberoamericano de Arte Contemporáneo (museum) opens.

== 21st century ==
- 2002 – La Crónica de Badajoz newspaper begins publication.
- 2006 – Palacio de Congresos de Badajoz (convention centre) opens.
- 2011
  - Torre Caja Badajoz (hi-rise) built.
  - Population: 151,214.
- 2013 – Francisco Javier Fragoso becomes mayor.

== See also ==
- History of Badajoz
- List of mayors of Badajoz
- List of bishops of Mérida-Badajoz

== Bibliography ==
- Josiah Conder (1830), "Badajoz", The Modern Traveller, London: J.Duncan
- Pascual Madoz, ed. (1846). "Badajoz". Diccionario geográfico-estadístico-histórico de España y sus posesiones de Ultramar (in Spanish). Vol. 3. Madrid. pp. 229+. hdl:2027/ucm.5325881250 – via HathiTrust.
- "Badajos" . Encyclopædia Britannica. Vol. 3 (9th ed.). 1878.
- Richard Ford (1890), "Badajoz", Handbook for Travellers in Spain (7th ed.), London: J. Murray, p. 291
- "Badajoz (city)" . Encyclopædia Britannica. Vol. 3 (11th ed.). 1910. pp. 181–182.
- "Badajoz", Spain and Portugal (4th ed.), Leipzig: Karl Baedeker, 1913, hdl:2027/uc2.ark:/13960/t5q81nw29 – via HathiTrust
- Trudy Ring, ed. (1995). "Badajoz". Southern Europe. International Dictionary of Historic Places. Vol. 3. Fitzroy Dearborn. pp. 72+. ISBN 1884964028.
