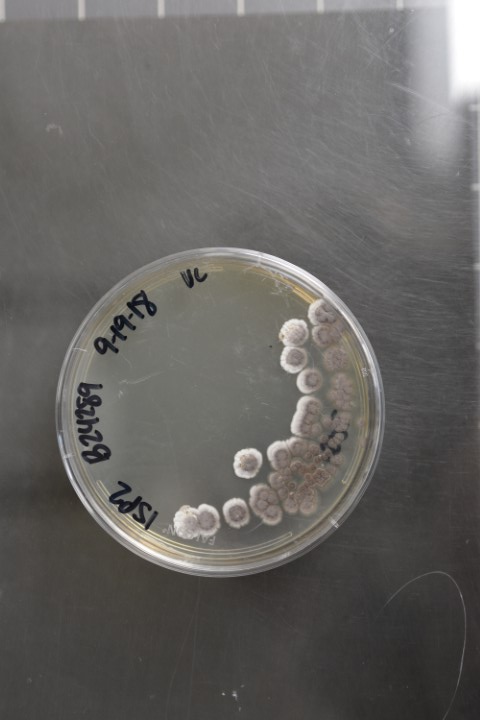

Scientific classification
- Domain: Bacteria
- Kingdom: Bacillati
- Phylum: Actinomycetota
- Class: Actinomycetes
- Order: Streptomycetales
- Family: Streptomycetaceae
- Genus: Streptomyces
- Species: S. castelarensis

Binomial name
- Streptomyces castelarensis Kumar and Goodfellow 2008

Type strain
- ATCC 15191, BCRC 11879, BJ-608, CBS 309.55, CCRC 11879, DSM 40830, DSM 41291, ETH 20732, IFO 15875, IMRU 3559, INA R-43, INTA 41, JCM 4978, KCC S-0978, NBRC 15875, RIA 851, VKM Ac-832

Synonyms
- Streptomyces rutgersensis subsp. castelarensis corrig. Cercós 1954 (Approved Lists 1980); Streptomyces sporoclivatus (ex Krassilnikov 1970) Preobrazhenskaya 1986; Streptomyces rutgersensis subsp. castelarense Cercós 1954 (Approved Lists 1980); Streptomyces antimycoticus Waksman 1957 (Approved Lists 1980)

= Streptomyces castelarensis =

Species of bacterium

Streptomyces castelarensis is a bacterium species from the genus of Streptomyces which has been isolated from dust in Castelar in Argentina. Streptomyces castelarensis produces camphomycin.

== See also ==
- List of Streptomyces species
