= Alberto Crescenti =

Argentine medical doctor (born 1953)

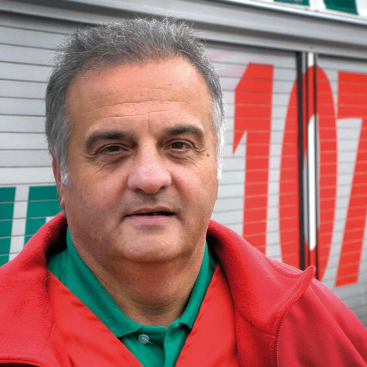
- Crescenti in 2020
- Born: Alberto Félix Crescenti; 5 January 1953 (age 73); Buenos Aires, Argentina
- Education: University of Buenos Aires
- Children: 2
- Medical career
- Institutions: SAME
- Sub-specialties: Emergency medicine
- Awards: Outstanding Citizen of Buenos Aires (Buenos Aires City Legislature); Honorary degree (Argentine University of Enterprise); Konex Award

Alberto Félix Crescenti (born 5 January 1953) is an Argentine emergency medical doctor. He is known for being the general director of the Sistema de Atención Médica de Emergencia (SAME; transl. Emergency Medical Care System), the Buenos Aires public emergency medical services system, from 1992 to 1997, and again since 2007.

== Early life and career ==
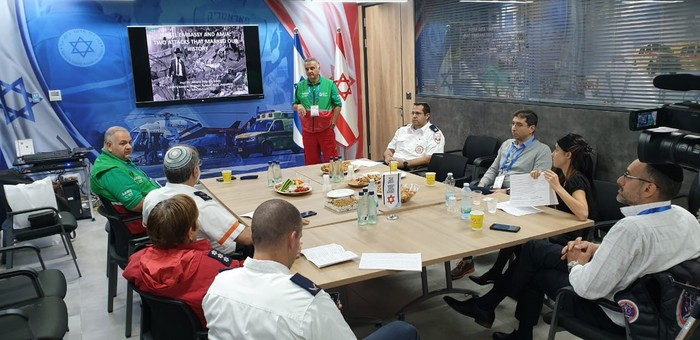
Crescenti during a conference in Tel Aviv, Israel

Alberto Félix Crescenti was born on 5 January 1953 in Nueva Pompeya, Buenos Aires. He majored in medicine in 1979 from the University of Buenos Aires.

Crescenti was the director of emergency of the SAME in 1991, and the general director from 1992 to 1997, and again since 2007. He was in charge of difficult operations, such as the 1992 Buenos Aires Israeli embassy bombing, the 1994 AMIA bombing, the 2012 Buenos Aires rail disaster, the 2013 Castelar rail accident, and the 2014 Iron Mountain fire. He was also part of the LAPA Flight 3142 and the Cromañón nightclub fire rescue operations, despite not being the director at those times. On 16 October 2024, Crescenti was responsible for announcing the death of former One Direction member Liam Payne, who died after falling from a third-floor balcony at a hotel in Palermo. He did not answer questions to the media, including on whether the death was a suicide or an accident.

== Personal life ==
Crescenti is married to Silvia, a psychologist, to whom he has two children. He lives in Belgrano, Buenos Aires.

== Awards and recognition ==
In 2018, Crescenti received a Konex Award as one of the 100 most outstanding personalities and institutions of the past decade from the Konex Foundation. In August 2020, he was awarded the Outstanding Personality distinction by the Buenos Aires City Legislature.
