= Villa Sarmiento =

- Location in Greater Buenos Aires
- Coordinates: 34°38′S 58°34′W
- Country: Argentina
- Province: Buenos Aires
- Partido: Morón
- Founded: April 4, 1909
- Elevation: 6 m (20 ft)

Population (2001 census [INDEC])
  - Total: 17,737
  - Density: 6,955.69/km^{2} (18,015.2/sq mi)
- CPA Base: B 1707
- Area code: +54 11

Villa Sarmiento is a locality in Morón Partido in the province of Buenos Aires, Argentina. It is home to 17,737 people and has an area of 2.55 km².

== History ==
With the foundation of the Fomento Villa Progreso society on 4 April 1909, the locality boomed and was taken into account by municipal authorities.

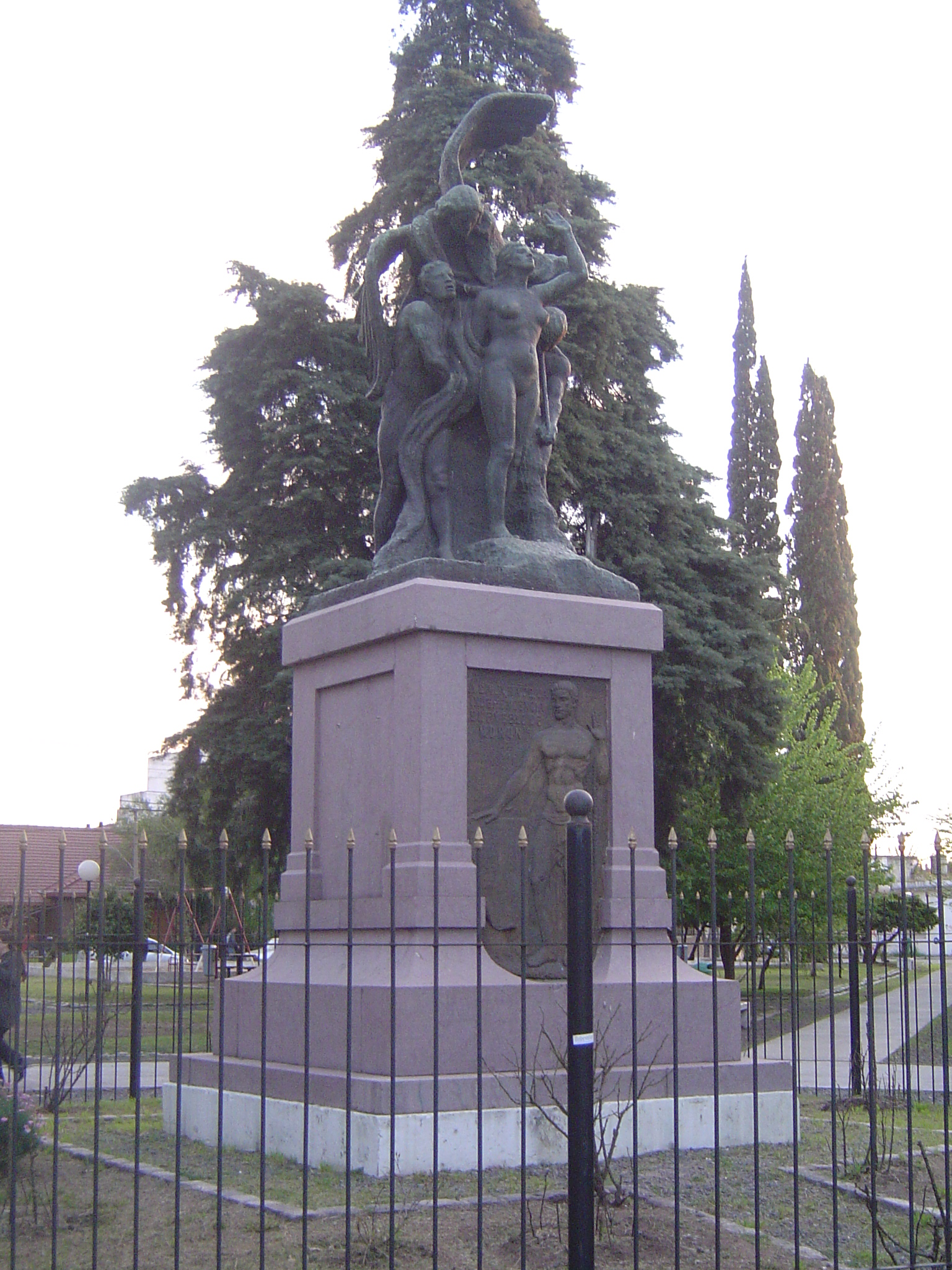
Statue in Plaza Alsina

In 1913, Ward School was founded, becoming a symbol of Villa Sarmiento for its impressive architecture and beautiful school grounds.

== See also ==
- Morón Partido
