= Maya Henry =

American model

- Born: December 15, 2000 (age 25); Corpus Christi, Texas, U.S.
- Education: New York University

Maya Henry (born December 15, 2000) is an American writer, and former model.

She gained public attention for her modeling work with international editions of Vogue, Elle, and Harper's Bazaar.

== Early life and education ==
Henry was born on December 15, 2000, in Corpus Christi, Texas, where she grew up, before her family moved to San Antonio. She is the daughter of Azteca Henry and prominent attorney Thomas J. Henry who founded and oversees Thomas J. Henry Injury Attorneys. She has an older brother, Thomas.

From the age of three to seventeen, Henry was a dedicated tennis player, competing at a competitive level.

== Career ==
=== Modeling and media attention ===
Henry first came to broader public attention through modeling work. She is represented by Elite Model Management and Select Model London, and has appeared on runways and in campaigns for Dolce & Gabbana, Burberry and Rami Kadi, and on prominent magazine covers, including international editions for Vogue, Elle, and Harper's Bazaar. Henry closed out George Hobeika’s Paris Fashion Week in 2021.

Henry lived in London starting at age 18, during which time she continued modeling and developing her voice as a writer.

=== Writing ===
Henry published her first novel, Looking Forward, in May 2024. The book tells the story of the fictional character Mallory Hunt from Tennessee, who falls in love with Oliver Smith, the lead singer of the band 5Forward, and their resulting tumultuous relationship. In media interviews, Henry has noted that the book is inspired by true events.

== Personal life ==
Henry began dating English singer Liam Payne, a former member of One Direction, in July 2018. Their relationship went public a year later. The couple became engaged in November 2019. Their engagement ended for good in 2022, after four years of a on-again, off-again relationship. Following their breakup, Henry published a semi-autobiographical novel titled Looking Forward, which explores themes of trauma, survival, and healing—drawing heavily from her personal experiences. She later revealed that the relationship involved physical and emotional abuse, as well as the non-consensual sharing of intimate images. These revelations have since shaped her public advocacy and writing.

== Activism ==
Maya Henry has been involved in philanthropic and environmental initiatives since a young age. In 2008, at age eight, she founded Maya’s Corner, a charitable organization dedicated to supporting children in need. The initiative focuses on providing school supplies and other essentials to underprivileged youth in Texas, aiming to alleviate issues related to education, hunger, and poverty.

In 2017, Henry spearheaded fundraising efforts for the Tree Media Foundation during the Houston Super Bowl Maxim Party silent auction, successfully raising $100,000.
