= Liam Payne =

English singer and songwriter (1993–2024)

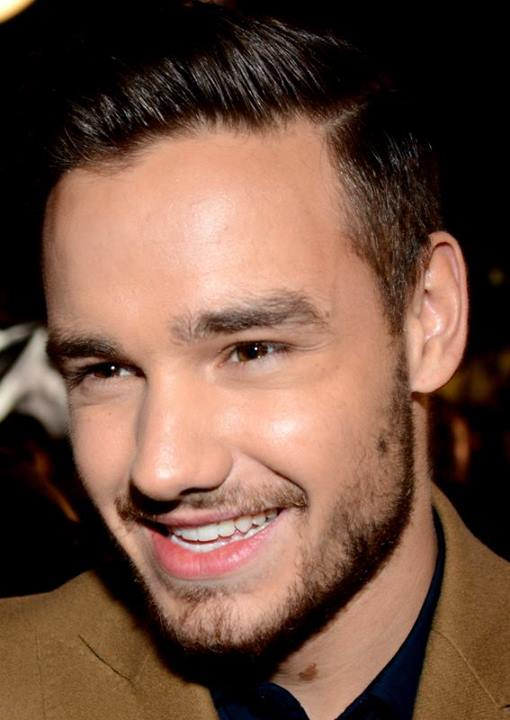
- Payne in 2013
- Born: 29 August 1993; Wolverhampton, West Midlands, England
- Died: 16 October 2024 (aged 31); Buenos Aires, Argentina
- Other name: Payno: Big Payno
- Occupations: Singer; songwriter (Note: Attributed to multiple sources:)
- Years active: 2008–2024
- Works: Solo discography; One Direction discography
- Partners: Cheryl (2016–2018); Maya Henry (2019–2022)
- Children: 1
- Musical career
- Genres: Pop; R&B
- Labels: Capitol; EMI
- Formerly of: One Direction
- Website: liampayneofficial.com

Liam James Payne (29 August 1993 – 16 October 2024) was an English singer and songwriter. He was a member of the pop band One Direction, one of the best-selling boy bands of all time, alongside Niall Horan, Zayn Malik, Harry Styles, and Louis Tomlinson. Payne twice auditioned as a solo artist on the British television series The X Factor in 2008 and 2010; in the latter, he joined One Direction, which released five albums and achieved global success.

Whilst in One Direction, Payne co-wrote a number of songs with Louis Tomlinson. Following the band's hiatus in 2016, Payne pursued a solo career, signing with Capitol and Republic Records. In 2017, he released his debut solo single "Strip That Down", which reached number three on the UK singles chart and number ten on the US Billboard Hot 100. The song received multi-platinum certifications in both countries. The following year, he released "For You", a collaboration with Rita Ora which became a hit worldwide and received gold or platinum certifications in several countries. His sole solo album, LP1, was released in December 2019. During the first three years of his solo career, Payne sold over 18 million singles, 2.4 million albums, and amassed 3.9 billion streams. In addition to his solo work, Payne produced remixes under the pseudonyms Big Payno and Payno, remixing tracks for singer Cheryl. Payne was a brand ambassador for Hugo Boss, appeared in television shows, and raised money for UNICEF, health, and food security causes.

Payne struggled with substance abuse and mental illness throughout his career. On 16 October 2024, he died at the age of 31 after falling from a third-floor balcony at a hotel in Buenos Aires, Argentina, while intoxicated with multiple substances. He was later revealed to have died from multiple traumatic injuries. In response to Payne's death, public figures criticised the music industry and media, and concerns were raised about the impact of fame on adolescents. Following his death, Payne's track "Teardrops" entered the UK singles chart, alongside all five One Direction albums.

== Early life ==
Liam James Payne was born in Wolverhampton on 29 August 1993, the son of infant nurse Karen Payne and aircraft fitter Geoff Payne. He had two older sisters named Nicola and Ruth. He grew up in Bushbury. Payne was born three weeks premature and suffered frequent illnesses. Until the age of four, he had regular tests done in hospital as doctors noticed one of his kidneys was scarred and dysfunctional. In the book Dare to Dream: Life as One Direction, he mentioned that before he was four, "I had to have 32 injections in my arm in the morning and evening to try and make me better."

As a student, Payne was heavily involved in sports, particularly running. Payne joined the Wolverhampton & Bilston Athletics Club to pursue his running career. He originally planned to work in an aircraft fitting factory, like his father.

He began taking boxing lessons at the age of 12 amidst bullying from older students in secondary school. Payne completed 11 GCSEs at St Peter's Collegiate School (now St Peter's Collegiate Academy) before moving on to study music technology at City of Wolverhampton College. Payne was introduced to the world of show business at the age of 12, as a member of the Pink Productions Theatre Company, appearing as Tony Manero from Saturday Night Fever. Payne had previously performed in front of a crowd of over 29,000 people during a Wolverhampton Wanderers football match.

== Career ==
=== 2008–2015: The X Factor and One Direction ===
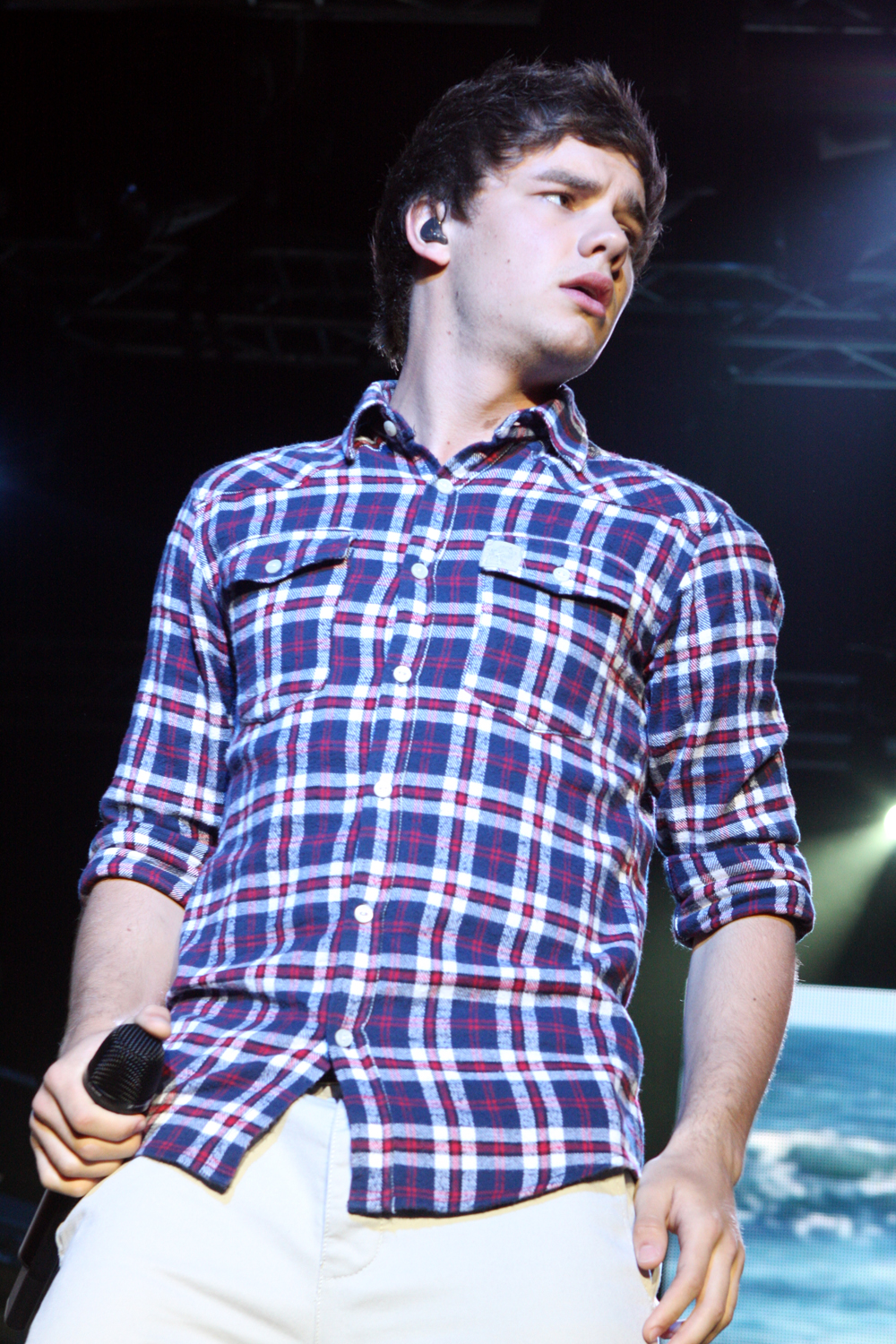
Payne performing with One Direction in Sydney, Australia, April 2012

Payne auditioned for the fifth series of The X Factor in 2008, at 14 years old, in front of judges Simon Cowell, Cheryl Cole, Dannii Minogue and Louis Walsh. Payne moved past the first round after performing Frank Sinatra's song "Fly Me to the Moon". He was cut at the boot camp stage, but Cowell then changed his mind and asked Payne to return for the judges' houses stage. Payne was cut again during judges' houses, but was encouraged by Cowell to "come back in two years".

Payne returned to the show in 2010 for the seventh series, auditioning in front of Cowell, Cole, Walsh and guest judge Natalie Imbruglia. He sang the Michael Bublé version of "Cry Me a River". He advanced but did not progress to the "Boys" category at judges' houses. During the boot camp stage of the competition, Payne, along with Harry Styles, Niall Horan, Louis Tomlinson, and Zayn Malik, were put together to form a five-piece boy band called One Direction, to compete in the "Groups" category. The group became the last contestant eliminated from the show.

In January 2011, One Direction were signed to Simon Cowell's Syco Entertainment. Their UK number one debut single, "What Makes You Beautiful", and their debut studio album, Up All Night, were released later that year. The album, which contained three songs co-written by Payne, debuted at number one in the United States. All of their next four studio albums—Take Me Home (2012), Midnight Memories (2013), Four (2014) and Made in the A.M. (2015)—debuted at number one in the UK. Midnight Memories was the world's best-selling album of 2013, and its accompanying Where We Are Tour was the highest-grossing tour of 2014. After the release of Four, One Direction became the only group in the 58-year history of the Billboard 200 albums chart to have their first four albums debut at number one. The albums spawned a string of successful singles, including "Live While We're Young", "Little Things", "Best Song Ever", "Story of My Life", "Drag Me Down" and "History". Following the departure of Malik in March 2015, Payne took over the bulk of his vocals.

Payne was credited for co-writing around half of the songs on One Direction's third album, and had a production credit on Made in the A.M.. Payne and Tomlinson were the band's highest-earning members. In August 2013, Payne recorded a dance track with American singer Miguel. In 2014, Payne began working as a producer under the monikers Big Payno and Payno, teaming up with fellow producers AfterHrs to remix several tracks including Cole's "I Don't Care" in 2014. Payne was also credited with co-writing Cole's "I Won't Break", from her album Only Human. In August 2014, Payne created and became director of Hampton Music Limited, a publishing company under which his solo projects appeared. Payne served as one of the directors for the production company One Mode Productions Limited. In 2015, Payne co-wrote Irish band Hometown's single "The Night We Met".

One Direction went on an indefinite hiatus in 2016, after completing promotional activities related to Made in the A.M. Since their debut, One Direction have sold 70 million records worldwide, including 7.6 million albums and 26 million singles in the US, becoming one of the best-selling boy bands of all time. The group amassed numerous accolades, including seven Brit Awards, seven American Music Awards, six Billboard Music Awards, and four MTV Video Music Awards.

=== 2016–2018: Solo debut and First Time ===
In 2015, Payne began working with rapper Juicy J. In early 2016, Payne featured on a track titled "You" by Wiz Khalifa and Juicy J; the track was a leak from an unreleased mixtape. In July 2016, Payne announced that he had signed a recording contract with Capitol Records. The following October, he signed a contract with Republic Records. His debut solo single "Strip That Down", featuring rapper Quavo and co-written with Ed Sheeran and Steve Mac, was released on 19 May 2017. The song was a commercial success, reaching number ten on the US Billboard Hot 100 and number three on the UK Singles Chart. "Strip That Down" was certified double platinum in the United Kingdom and 3× platinum in the United States. Payne followed up this release with two UK top 30 singles: "Get Low", a collaboration with producer Zedd which was certified silver, and "Bedroom Floor", which was certified gold. In June 2017, Payne contributed to a charity single supporting those affected by the Grenfell Tower fire.

In January 2018, Payne collaborated with Rita Ora on "For You", released as a single from the soundtrack of the film Fifty Shades Freed. The song was a commercial success worldwide, peaking within the top ten of several countries. "For You" was certified diamond in Brazil, platinum in the United Kingdom, and received gold or platinum certifications in thirteen other countries. In April 2018, Payne released "Familiar" with J Balvin, which peaked at number 14 in the United Kingdom and was certified platinum. On 30 March 2018, Payne performed in front of more than 110,000 people during a free concert at Global Village 2018 in Dubai. Payne initially announced that his debut album would be released on 14 September 2018, but he delayed the release to continue work on it, stating that some of its songs "felt from another age". Instead, he released his first EP (extended play), First Time, on 24 August 2018. The EP's only single was "First Time", a collaboration with French Montana. He collaborated with Jonas Blue and Lennon Stella on the single "Polaroid", released on 5 October 2018. The single peaked at number 12 in the United Kingdom and was certified platinum. During the first three years of his solo career, Payne sold over 18 million singles, 2.4 million albums, and amassed 3.9 billion streams.

=== 2019–2024: LP1 and planned second studio album ===
Payne in July 2019

Payne released the song "Stack It Up", featuring American rapper A Boogie wit da Hoodie, on 18 September 2019. A month later, Payne announced that his debut album, LP1, would be released on 6 December 2019. Several of Payne's previous single releases were included on the album's track list, and Payne released "All I Want (For Christmas)" on 25 October as the sixth single from the album. LP1 debuted at number 17 on the UK Albums Chart and number 111 on the Billboard 200. The album was certified gold in the United Kingdom and platinum in Canada.

In April 2020, Payne and DJ Alesso released the single "Midnight", and Payne began a weekly YouTube series, in which he discussed his life, charitable work, and performances. In July, Payne launched The LP Show, a livestream series on Veeps. "Act 1" was a live-streamed concert, and part of the proceeds from ticket sales supported UK food banks. On 9 October 2020, Payne and Alesso released Midnight Hour, a collaborative EP. Midnight Hour reached number 2 on Billboard's Dance/Electronic Digital Song Sales chart. Later that month, Payne released "Naughty List", a Christmas single featuring Dixie D'Amelio. In August 2021, Payne released the single "Sunshine", which was featured in the film Ron's Gone Wrong.

In May 2023, Payne announced that he was working on his second album. He planned his first solo tour, with dates for Latin America scheduled to take place in September 2023, but the tour was postponed after Payne was hospitalised in August 2023 with a kidney infection. Payne returned to music with the single "Teardrops", which was released on 1 March 2024. The single was co-written with NSYNC member JC Chasez. "Teardrops" did not chart upon release, but debuted at number 85 on the UK Singles Chart following Payne's death in October 2024. On 28 October 2024, American musician Sam Pounds announced that Payne would be the featured artist on his single "Do No Wrong", to be released on 1 November 2024. However, a day later, he delayed the single, as he felt that it was not yet time.

== Artistry ==
On One Direction's later three albums, especially Four, Payne became a "prolific co-writer" with over 30 credits total, second only to Louis Tomlinson, with whom he frequently collaborated. Where Tomlinson was known for his lyricism, Payne had a penchant for coming up with melodies. He told Entertainment Weekly in 2015 that the two tracks he was most proud of were "Better Than Words" and "What a Feeling". The former is composed of titles from other songs, while he and Tomlinson wrote the latter inspired by Fleetwood Mac.

Payne was a pop and R&B singer. He cited Chris Brown, Pharrell Williams, Justin Timberlake, and Usher as being major musical influences. Payne noted that Williams' producer told him that, "when [Williams] was [Payne's] age he couldn't press a note on a keyboard." Payne thought this was "amazing", as he had thought he was "too old to learn guitar" at twenty-two. His first exposure to rock music was through Linkin Park's Hybrid Theory with "In the End", as they were the gateway for him to listen to other types of music outside of what he would typically listen to as a child. Payne would label "In the End" as one of the most important songs of his life. Payne often sang falsetto.

== Public image ==
Payne was known as the "responsible one" and "diplomat" of One Direction, due to being a "bit more mature" than the other members. He stated that this led to him being viewed as "Mr Boring". Payne was sometimes nicknamed "Daddy Direction". In The Guardian, Elle Hunt described Payne's persona as a solo artist as "Rolex-flaunting, quasi-rapping, [and] lusty".

== Other ventures ==
=== Fashion ===
Payne was named the first global brand ambassador for German brand Hugo Boss in May 2019. The first Hugo x Liam Payne capsule collection was revealed during Berlin Fashion Week in July 2020. His second capsule collection with Hugo Boss was launched in May 2020. The collection, which mainly consists of men's wardrobes, includes polo shirts, T-shirts, shorts, hoodies, sweatpants and a pair of sneakers. In January 2020, Payne starred in the Hugo Boss fragrance campaign for their perfume Hugo Now.

=== NFT ===
In June 2021, Payne launched a non-fungible token (NFT) digital artwork collection, titled "Lonely Bug". The project was inspired by COVID-19 lockdowns. On 25 January 2022, he dedicated a separate Twitter account @PaynoETH solely to cover the subject.

=== Film and television ===
In 2019, Payne auditioned for Steven Spielberg's version of West Side Story. Payne had a cameo in the 2021 film Ron's Gone Wrong. In June 2025, it was announced that Payne acted as a guest judge on Netflix's 2025 music competition series Building the Band, aired in July that year. The show was his final televised appearance.

=== Philanthropy ===
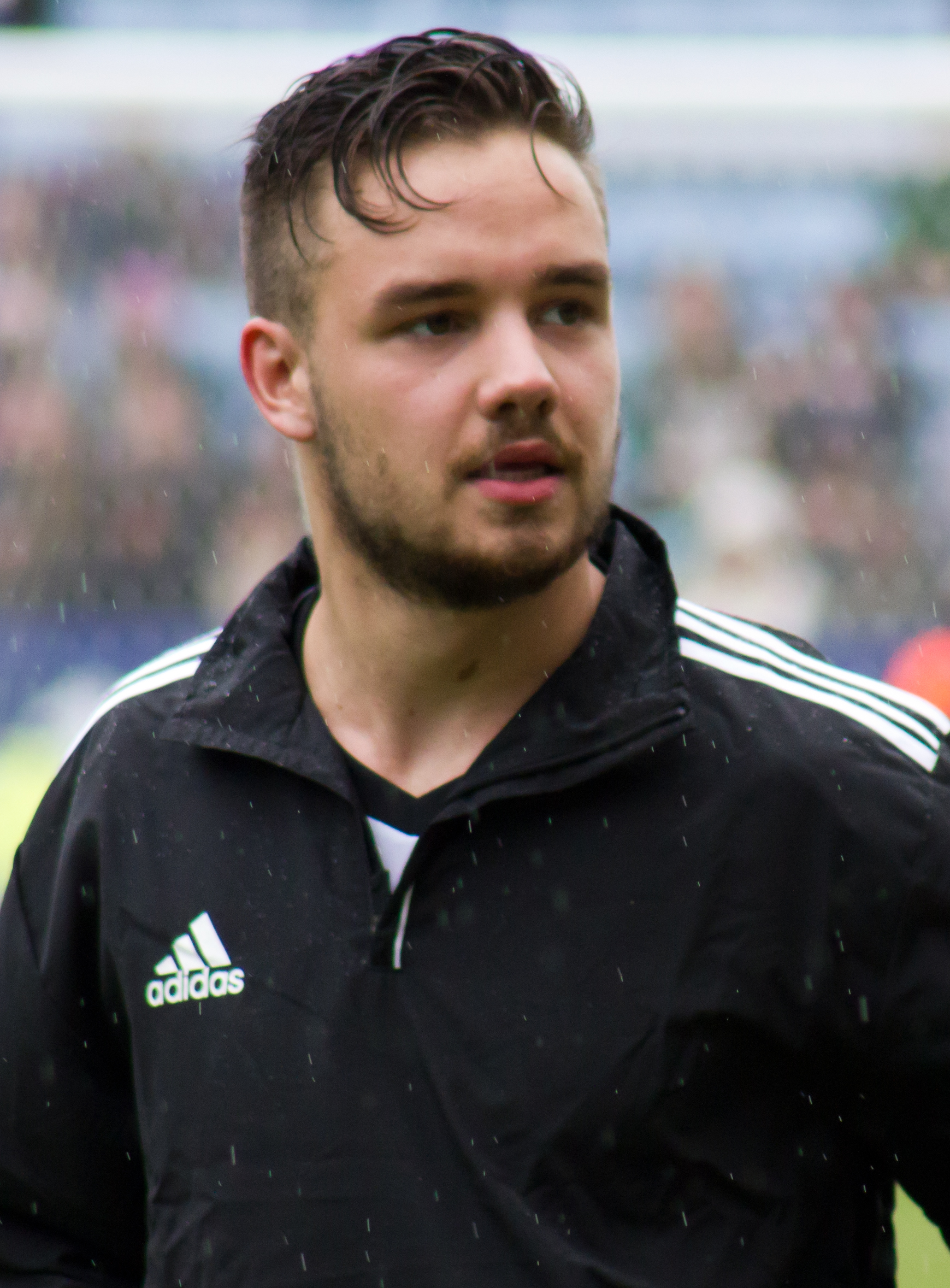
Payne at a charity football event in Leicester, England, May 2014

Payne was a supporter of UNICEF and teamed up with tennis planey Andy Murray, comedian Jack Whitehall and broadcaster Clare Balding to support UNICEF UK's Children in Danger Summer Disease Appeal. Payne teamed up with motorsport star Eddie Jordan in support of UK based charity CLIC Sargent. Payne was an ambassador for the youth cancer charity Trekstock, along with bandmate Harry Styles. In 2015, Payne helped to promote a £6 million youth project named "The Youth Zone" in his hometown of Wolverhampton.

Payne co-hosted a charity ball in honour of Believe in Magic, an organisation that supported terminally ill children, with bandmate Louis Tomlinson. Tomlinson donated £50,000 for Payne's face to be painted. Collectively Payne and Tomlinson donated over £5 million at the event. In 2018, Payne and Tomlinson filmed an episode of Gogglebox in support for Stand Up to Cancer.

Payne was an advocate for food security. Beginning in early 2020, he became a donor to the Trussell Trust and its network of UK food banks, funding more than 360,000 meals during the COVID-19 pandemic. He said, "I'm glad to be playing my small part as we work towards a future in which nobody needs a food bank." Payne donated £80,000 and volunteered to help out in person at Euston Food Bank and Food for All in Holborn, which was not revealed until after his death. Food for All director Pete O'Grady said Payne "didn't want anyone to make a thing about it. He let nobody know of his generosity".

Payne participated in UNICEF's Soccer Aid. In 2022, he captained the English team, and returned for the 2023 event. Payne donated thousands of pounds to various GoFundMe pages in the month prior to his death. In a Snapchat video uploaded at the time he explained, "I've been going on night by night by night, trying to finish off people's donations so that they can get the operations they need."

== Personal life ==
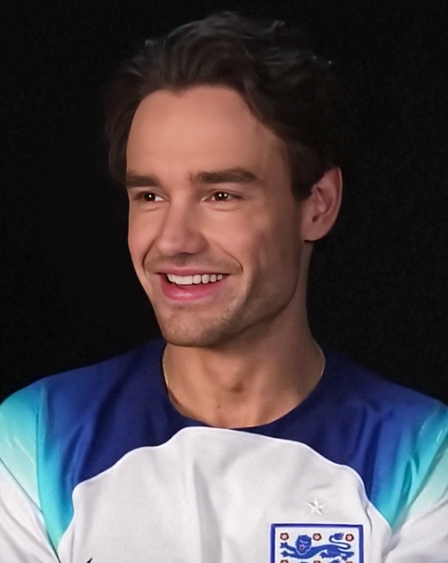
Payne for UNICEF in 2023

Liam Payne started dating Danielle Peazer, a dancer on The X Factor, in 2010; he was 17 and she was 22. They broke up in 2013. From 2013 to 2015, he dated childhood friend Sophia Smith. In late 2015, he started dating singer Cheryl, whom he first met at his first X Factor audition, where she was a judge. They had one son, who was born on 22 March 2017. Their relationship ended in 2018, but the two remained close; they jointly stated on social media that they "still have so much love for each other as a family."

Payne began dating model Maya Henry in 2019. They became engaged in August 2020, but had separated by June 2021. The couple reunited that year and were again engaged. In May 2022, the couple ended their engagement for a second time. In May 2024, Henry published a novel depicting an abusive relationship between a model and a member of a boy band, which has been described as a fictionalised account of her relationship with Payne. Shortly before Payne's death, Henry accused him of harassment following their breakup. From October 2022 until his death, Payne had been in a relationship with influencer Kate Cassidy.

Payne owned a home in Surrey, but listed it for sale in 2020. In 2020, he moved to Chalfont St Giles, Buckinghamshire to be near his son, having previously lived with Cheryl in nearby Chalfont St Peter. Following Payne's death, his estate was valued at a net worth of $29,007,998. Court documents confirmed in 2026 that Cheryl and lawyer Richard Bray were appointed administrators, with the entire estate held in a trust for Payne's son. Payne died without leaving a will.

Payne was a supporter of the football team West Bromwich Albion. In October 2023, he was banned from driving for six months due to a speeding conviction.

=== Political views ===
Payne was pro-choice. In May 2019, after anti-abortion legislation passed in Alabama, he said that the state was "taking away the rights of women", and questioned whether America was still "the land of the free". In May 2020, Payne expressed support for the Black Lives Matter movement and encouraged fans to educate themselves and donate. He attended London Black Lives Matter protests.

=== Health ===
Payne struggled with alcoholism since the peak of One Direction's success. He mentioned being locked in hotel rooms with a mini-bar between gigs. After One Direction broke up, Payne had therapy for two years. After the release of "Strip That Down" in 2017, he gave up alcohol for a year. In July 2023, Payne mentioned being sober for six months, and spending 100 days in a rehab facility in Louisiana. Payne also suffered from anxiety, "a bit of agoraphobia," and suicidal thoughts.In August 2023, Payne was hospitalised with a kidney infection.

On 1 June 2022, Payne appeared to be intoxicated while being interviewed by Logan Paul for his podcast series. Payne said that One Direction originated with a promise that Simon Cowell had made to him; Payne had previously appeared on the show, and Cowell purportedly pledged to "make it work" should he return. He also discussed former fellow member Zayn Malik's family life and said: "There's many reasons why I dislike Zayn and there's many reasons why I'll always, always be on his side". He later clarified his remarks on Malik and apologised.

== Death ==
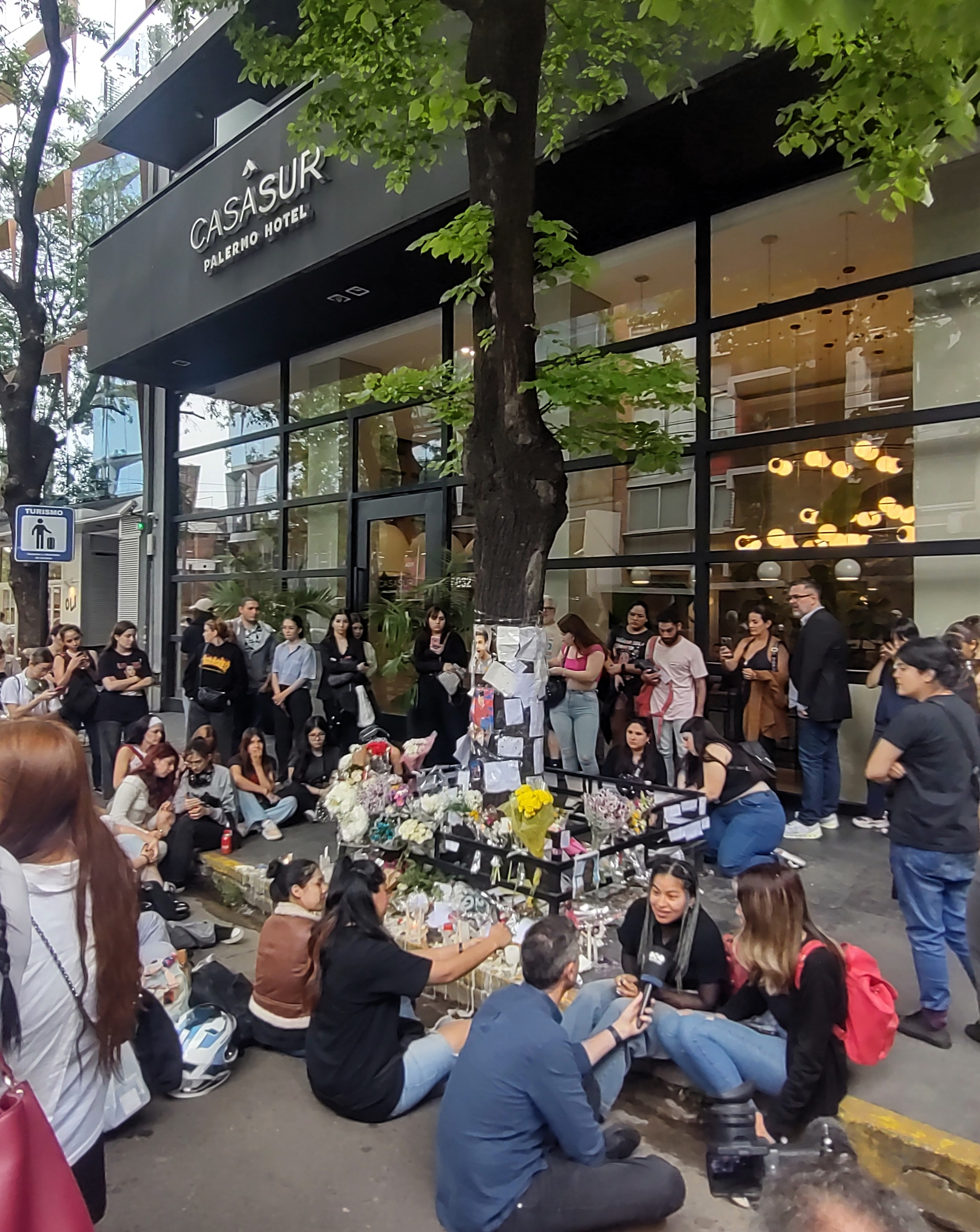
A group of fans gathered outside the front of the CasaSur Hotel in Argentina, where Payne died.

In early October 2024, Payne and his girlfriend Kate Cassidy travelled to Argentina to attend Niall Horan's The Show: Live on Tour concert. He had posted about his intention to travel to Argentina in videos to his Snapchat account. Cassidy returned to her home in Florida on 14 October, with Payne staying in Argentina. Shortly before his death, he reportedly told a fan staying at the same hotel "I used to be in a boyband, that's why I'm so fucked up."

On 16 October, Payne died after falling from a third-floor balcony at the CasaSur hotel in the Palermo neighbourhood of Buenos Aires, aged 31. Police went to the hotel following an emergency call from the hotel manager, who reported "an aggressive man who could be under the effects of drugs and alcohol". The manager indicated in the call that "when he is conscious he is destroying the entire room and we need you to send someone", noting that the man's life was at risk due to the room having a balcony. Minutes after emergency services arrived, Payne fell from the balcony and crashed to the ground. His death was confirmed at 5:11 p.m. The emergency medical team that arrived at the hotel reported a "cranial fracture and extremely serious injuries" that led to Payne's immediate death.

Alberto Crescenti, the director of Buenos Aires' public emergency medical service, announced Payne's death on the Argentine news channel TN, saying that the fall was from a height of approximately 13 to 14 metres (43 to 46 ft) and that Payne sustained "very serious injuries incompatible with life" leaving "no possibility of resuscitation". Crescenti declined to comment on whether the death was a suicide or an accident. Pablo Policicchio, communications director for the Buenos Aires Security Ministry, stated that Payne "had jumped from the balcony of his room". The office did not respond to follow-up questions regarding the claim and directed the reporters to the prosecutor's office. The forensic experts later reported that Payne "did not adopt a reflexive posture to protect himself" and that he "could have fallen in a state of semi or total unconsciousness". According to Argentine journalist Paula Varela, citing unreleased CCTV footage, Payne accidentally fell to his death after fainting on the balcony.

Payne's body was initially interred at the Cementerio Británico in Buenos Aires before being repatriated by air to the United Kingdom on 6 November. His funeral was held on 20 November at Saint Mary's Church in Amersham, Buckinghamshire.

=== Investigation ===
Authorities opened an investigation into Payne's death and conducted a post-mortem. Police said that several medications and energy supplements were found in his room, including clonazepam, and that a whiskey bottle was found in the courtyard where his body was recovered. Initial post-mortem examination indicated that Payne died from internal and external haemorrhages and multiple traumatic injuries. The forensic experts reported 25 injuries caused by the fall and said that Payne's traumatic brain injuries were "enough to cause death", with bleeding in his head and upper body contributing to his death. The examination found no signs of a fight and noted that Payne was alone in the room at the time of his death.

The media initially reported that Payne had "multiple substances" in his system when he died, including pink cocaine, crack cocaine, and a benzodiazepine. However, on 22 October, Argentina's public prosecutor's office clarified that the toxicology report was not yet complete and denied that any details had been disclosed. On the night of 23 October, a week after Payne's fall, Buenos Aires police raided the CasaSur Hotel. A government official revealed police had seized items such as hard drives. On 7 November, prosecutors said that post-mortem toxicological exams on Payne showed "traces of alcohol, cocaine and a prescribed antidepressant" prior to his death. That same day, Argentine police charged three people with "abandonment of a person followed by death" and "supplying and facilitating the use of narcotics" over Payne's death. The suspects were identified as: a companion of Payne; a hotel employee who provided cocaine to Payne while he was at the hotel; and a drug dealer.

On 8 January 2025, Payne's cause of death was confirmed in a UK inquest opening as polytrauma. In November 2025, the inquest was adjourned until May 2026, as the coroner sought eyewitness reports. In May 2026, the inquest was adjourned again, and a pre-inquest review was scheduled for December 2026.

==== Criminal charges ====
On 30 December 2024, an Argentinean judge charged five people in connection with Payne's death. Two people, a waiter who met with Payne in a local restaurant and an employee of the hotel where Payne stayed at the time of his death, were charged with supplying Payne with the drugs he took shortly before his death and were ordered to be held in pre-trial detention at a preventive prison. Three others, a businessman who was with Payne in Argentina and two managers of the hotel, were charged with manslaughter. On 20 February 2025, the manslaughter charges were dropped against the three suspects.

=== Aftermath ===
==== Reactions ====
Payne's family released a statement shortly after his death, stating that they were "heartbroken" and that Payne would "live forever" in their hearts, and asking for privacy as they supported each other. Payne's father Geoff and One Direction's former head of security Paul Higgins arrived in Buenos Aires on 18 October. His former partner Cheryl issued a public request for consideration and dignity, fearing their son could potentially access "the abhorrent reports and media exploitation" around his father's death later in life. Payne's One Direction bandmates released a joint statement asking for time to speak more on his death and that they were grieving and processing it, with individual statements of respect coming from each member and Styles' mother. Malik later announced that he would be postponing the US leg of his Stairway to the Sky Tour following news of Payne's death.

Musicians across the world paid tribute to Payne. A number of public figures, including Sharon Osbourne, Rebecca Ferguson, and Bruce Springsteen, raised concerns about the music industry, media, and adolescent fame in their commemorations. Musician Robbie Williams, relating Payne's struggles to his own, made a plea for compassion, saying, "We don't know what's going on in people's lives". Songwriter Guy Chambers suggested that those under the age of eighteen should not be allowed to join pop bands. Public relations consultant Mark Borkowski commented that Payne's death "[shook] the foundations of how we perceive celebrity and fame". Filming of auditions for series 18 of Britain's Got Talent, a show produced by Simon Cowell, was suspended out of respect; production resumed that weekend, with Cowell absent for some episodes. Production on Simon Cowell: The Next Act was also paused. Cowell himself paid tribute two days after Payne's death.

UK prime minister Sir Keir Starmer said his "sincere condolences" were with Liam's family and friends. Starmer also referred to One Direction's "huge impact on many millions of fans around the world". Wolverhampton councillor Simon Bennett said Payne should posthumously receive the Freedom of the City honour. Wolverhampton Wanderers F.C. and West Bromwich Albion paid tributes to Payne. Members of Wolverhampton's local council supported the creation of a permanent memorial to Payne.

On 18 October, a fan began a petition calling for "Liam's Law" to protect artists' mental health, which would enforce access to mental health professionals, regular mental health checks, and adequate rest periods. Within five days, their petition had been signed by over 68,000 people. Some fans started a conspiracy theory that Payne's death was connected to the criminal case against Sean Combs.

On 25 October, all five One Direction albums reentered the top 40 of the UK Albums Chart at numbers 13 (Midnight Memories), 21 (Made in the A.M.), 22 (Four), 25 (Take Me Home), and 38 (Up All Night), with Payne's solo album LP1 re-entering at number 62. In addition, the One Direction songs "Night Changes", "Story of My Life", and "What Makes You Beautiful" and Payne songs "Strip That Down", "Get Low", and "Teardrops" entered the UK singles chart at positions six, nine, 23, 41, 43, and 85, with "Night Changes" bettering its previous peak of 7, "Teardrops" entering for the first time, and a further five One Direction tracks barred by chart rules.

==== Media coverage ====
Within hours of Payne's death, American tabloid website TMZ obtained photographs of his corpse, and published cropped images that showed his arm and waist. Their decision to publish the photos was criticised by a number of fans and public figures, prompting the outlet to remove the images. The publication of the photographs was legal in the United States. Photos of a hotel room and footage reported to be of the fall from the balcony were also released.

ABC News and Hulu produced an episode of Impact X Nightline about Payne's "final days", featuring contributions from X Factor contestant Mary Byrne and numerous ABC journalists before Payne's body had been buried, prompting criticism from a reviewer at The A.V. Club. Former BBC newsreader Michael Buerk accused the corporation of excessive coverage of the death. Buerk was criticised by some social media users for referring to Payne as a "drugged up, faded, boy band singer". Payne's family described media coverage of his death as causing "indescribable, lasting damage", especially to Payne's son.

==== Memorials ====
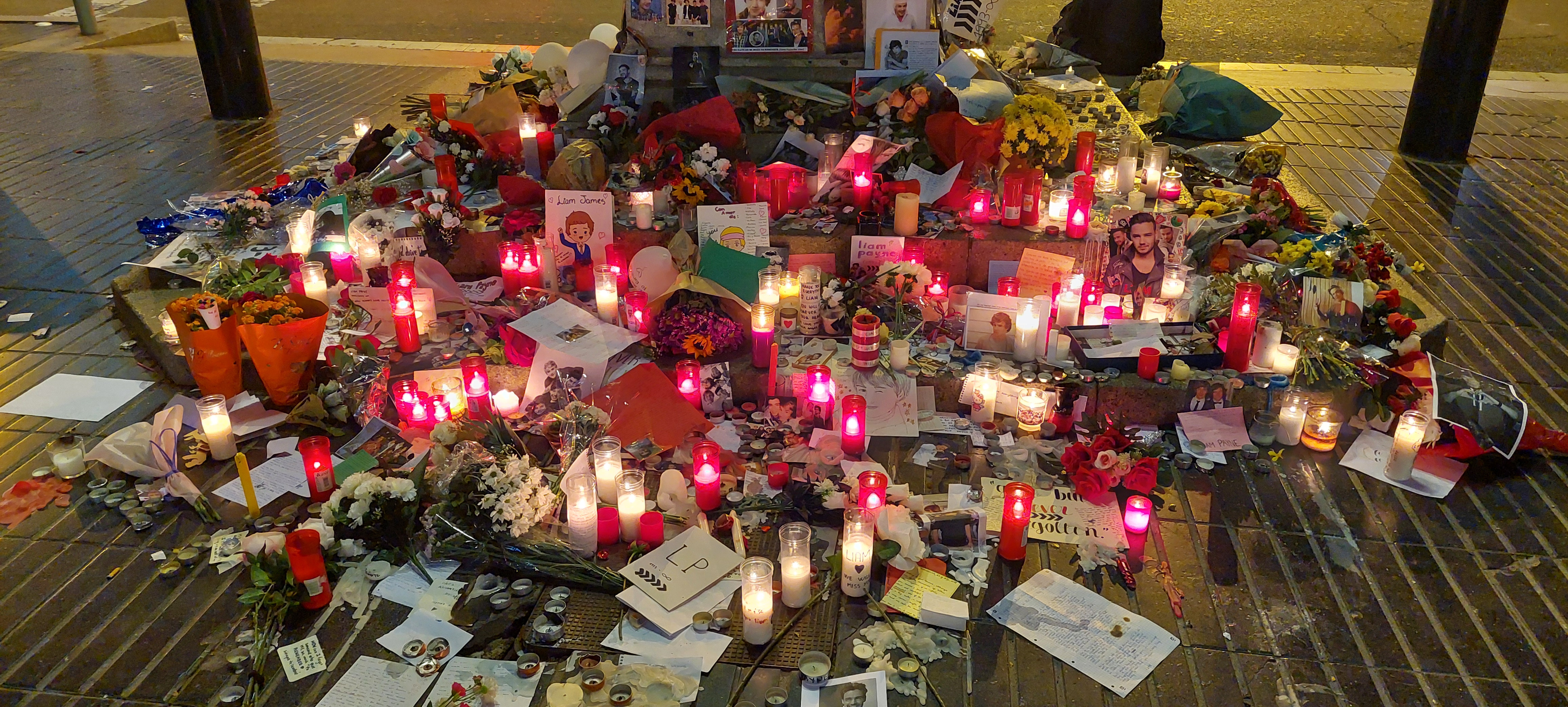
A memorial to Payne at La Rambla, Barcelona, October 2024

Shortly after his death, fans of the singer and One Direction gathered outside the hotel in Buenos Aires before breaking into applause as the van carrying Payne's body was driven away. The group then lit candles and wept before dispersing. Payne's father, Geoff, visited the memorial upon arriving in Buenos Aires. Fans also gathered to light candles in Mexico City on 17 October and a service was held in Copenhagen. Written notes were left at London's Hard Rock Cafe, where the telephone box featured on the cover art of Take Me Home is on display.

At Clevedon Pier, where One Direction filmed the music video for "You & I", fans came to lay flowers at the One Direction plaque, which was installed to commemorate the filming of the music video. The pier's management also issued a statement of condolence and, in January 2025, a plaque was installed on the pier in Payne's memory. A vigil was held at the Lady Wulfrun statue at St Peter's Collegiate Church on 18 October. A fan memorial with an estimated attendance of up to 1,000 took place at Hyde Park on 20 October. Memorials were held in other UK cities over the weekend. Further memorials were held in cities across the world, including in New York's Washington Square Park. Further tributes were paid in Wolverhampton on the one year anniversary of Payne's death.

Rita Ora paid tribute to Payne at the 2024 MTV Europe Music Awards, calling him "one of the kindest people that [she] knew". Malik paid tribute to Payne at the end of all of his Stairway to the Sky Tour shows. The 2025 Brit Awards included a video montage paying tribute to Payne. In January 2025, One Direction: This Is Us was re-released in some cinemas, with proceeds from screenings donated to mental health charities. Niall Horan rewrote the lyrics to End of an Era following Payne's death. On the two year anniversary of Payne's death, Harry Styles performed "What Is Enough", an unreleased song honouring him.

== Discography ==
Studio album

- LP1 (2019)

== Filmography ==
List of TV appearances
Year	Title	Role	Notes	Ref.
2012	iCarly	Himself	Guest role; Episode: "iGo One Direction"	
2016	Family Guy	Himself	Voice role; Episode: "Run, Chris, Run"	
2018	Celebrity Gogglebox	Himself	With Louis Tomlinson	
2021	Ron's Gone Wrong	Unnamed B-bot	Voice role; cameo; final acting role	
2025	Building the Band	Judge	Posthumous release	

== Awards and nominations ==
Year	Organisation	Category	Nominee/work	Result	Ref.
2015	Attitude	Sexiest Man of the Year	Liam Payne	Won	
2016	BMI London Awards	Pop Award Songs	"Night Changes"	Won	
2016	BMI London Awards	Pop Award Songs	"Steal My Girl"	Won	
2017	Teen Choice Awards	Choice Summer Male Artist	Liam Payne	Nominated	
2017	Teen Choice Awards	Choice Male Hottie	Liam Payne	Nominated	
2018	Brit Awards	British Single	"Strip That Down" (featuring Quavo)	Nominated	
2018	Brit Awards	British Artist Video of the Year	"Strip That Down" (featuring Quavo)	Nominated	
2018	BMI Pop Awards	Award Winning Songs	"Strip That Down"	Won	
2018	Global Awards	Best Male	Liam Payne	Nominated	
2018	Global Awards	Best British Artist or Group	Liam Payne	Nominated	
2018	Global Awards	Best Pop	Liam Payne	Nominated	
2018	Global Awards	The Global Special Award	Liam Payne	Won	
2018	iHeartRadio Music Awards	Best New Pop Artist	Liam Payne	Nominated	
2018	iHeartRadio Music Awards	Best Solo Breakout	Liam Payne	Nominated	
2018	LOS40 Music Awards	International New Artist of the Year	Liam Payne	Nominated	
2018	LOS40 Music Awards	International Video of the Year	"Familiar" (with J Balvin)	Nominated	
2018	MTV Video Music Awards	Best Dance Video	"Get Low" (with Zedd)	Nominated	
2018	Teen Choice Awards	Choice Latin Song	"Familiar" (with J Balvin)	Won	
2018	Teen Choice Awards	Choice Summer Song	"Familiar" (with J Balvin)	Nominated	
2018	Teen Choice Awards	Choice Summer Male Artist	Liam Payne	Nominated	
2019	Brit Awards	British Artist Video of the Year	"For You" (with Rita Ora)	Nominated	
2019	BreakTudo Awards	Best Soundtrack Music	"For You" (with Rita Ora)	Nominated	
2019	Global Awards	Best Male	Liam Payne	Nominated	
2019	Global Awards	Best Pop	Liam Payne	Nominated	
