= Castelar Park =

Park in Badajoz, Spain

Coordinates: 38°52′41″N 6°58′37″W

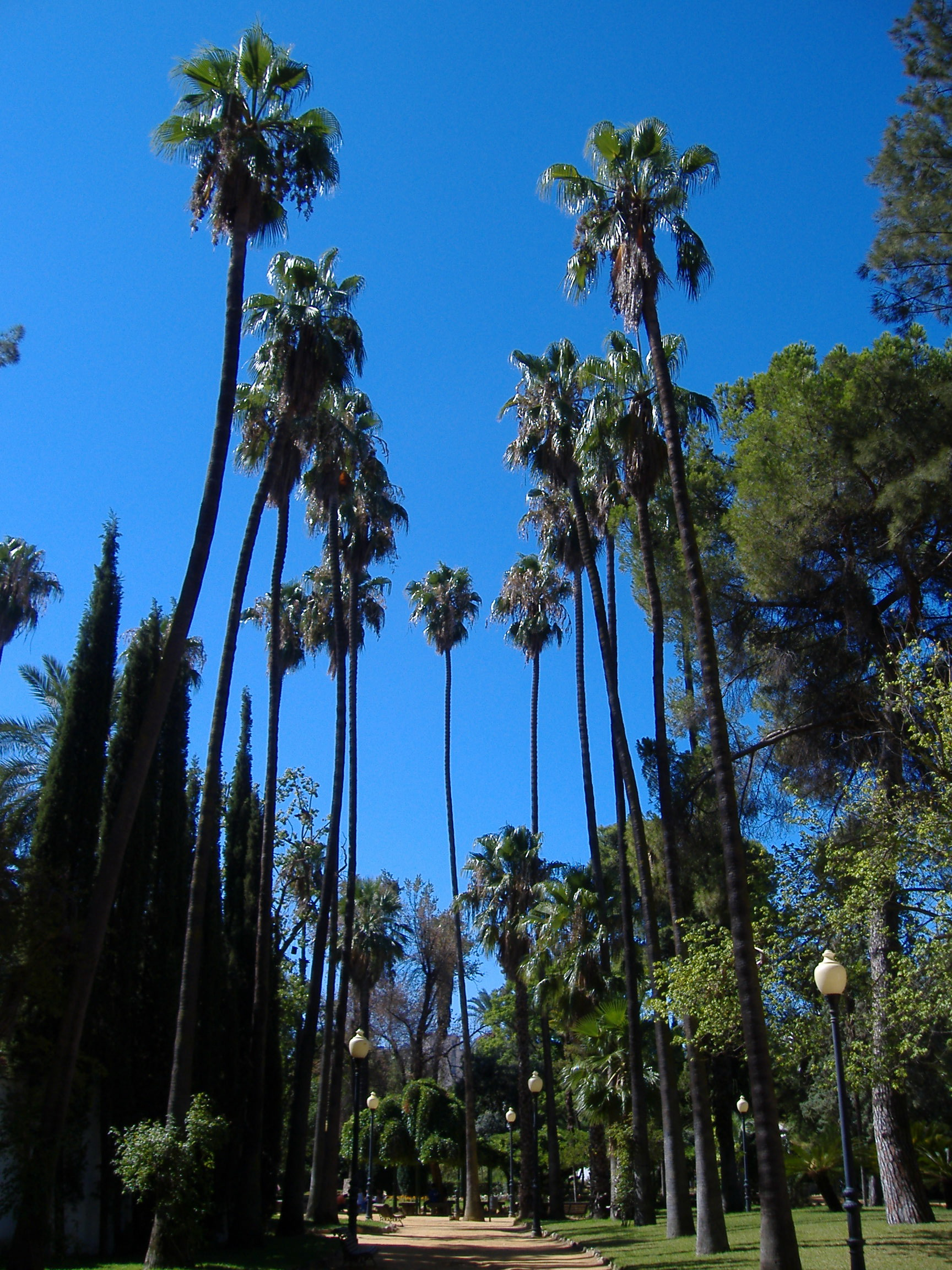
Castelar Park

Castelar Park (Parque de Castelar) is located in Badajoz, in Extremadura, Spain. Situated south of Guadiana River, its features include tall palm trees and a central pond, frequented by ducks and pigeons; peacocks wander around the park. There are monuments dedicated to the romanticist writer Carolina Coronado, who lived in Badajoz, and to Luis Chamizo Trigueros, who was born in Guareña. Although Castelar remained neglected for many years, it was renovated during the tenure of Mayor Miguel Angel Celdran Matute (1996-present), making it a venue for fairs, exhibitions, entertainment and leisure. Parque Infantil (Playground) is located across the street.
