= Cathedral of Morón, Argentina =

Roman Catholic cathedral in Buenos Aires Province, Argentina

Coordinates: 34.652003°S 58.621561°W

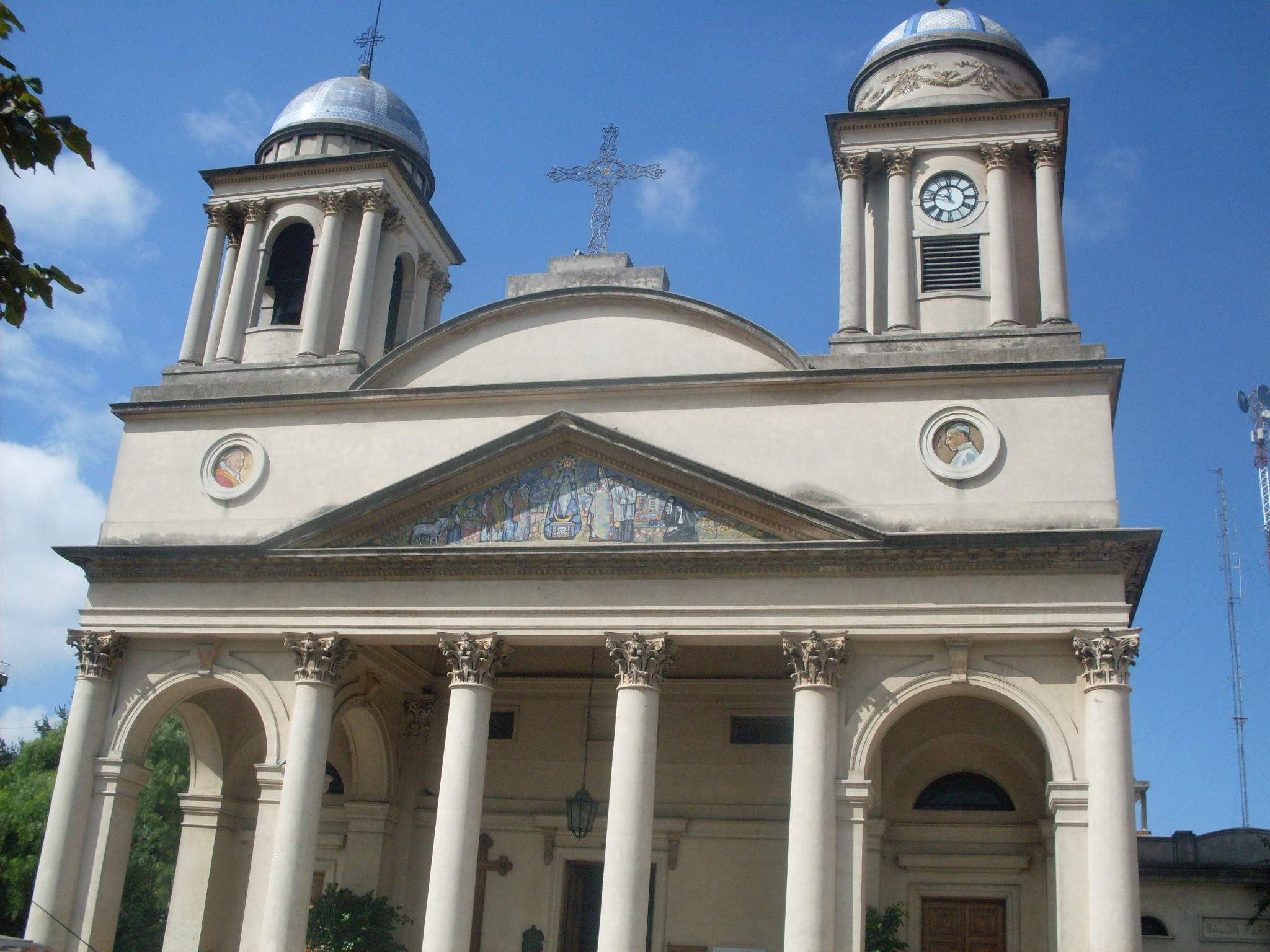
Exterior of the Catedral Basílica.

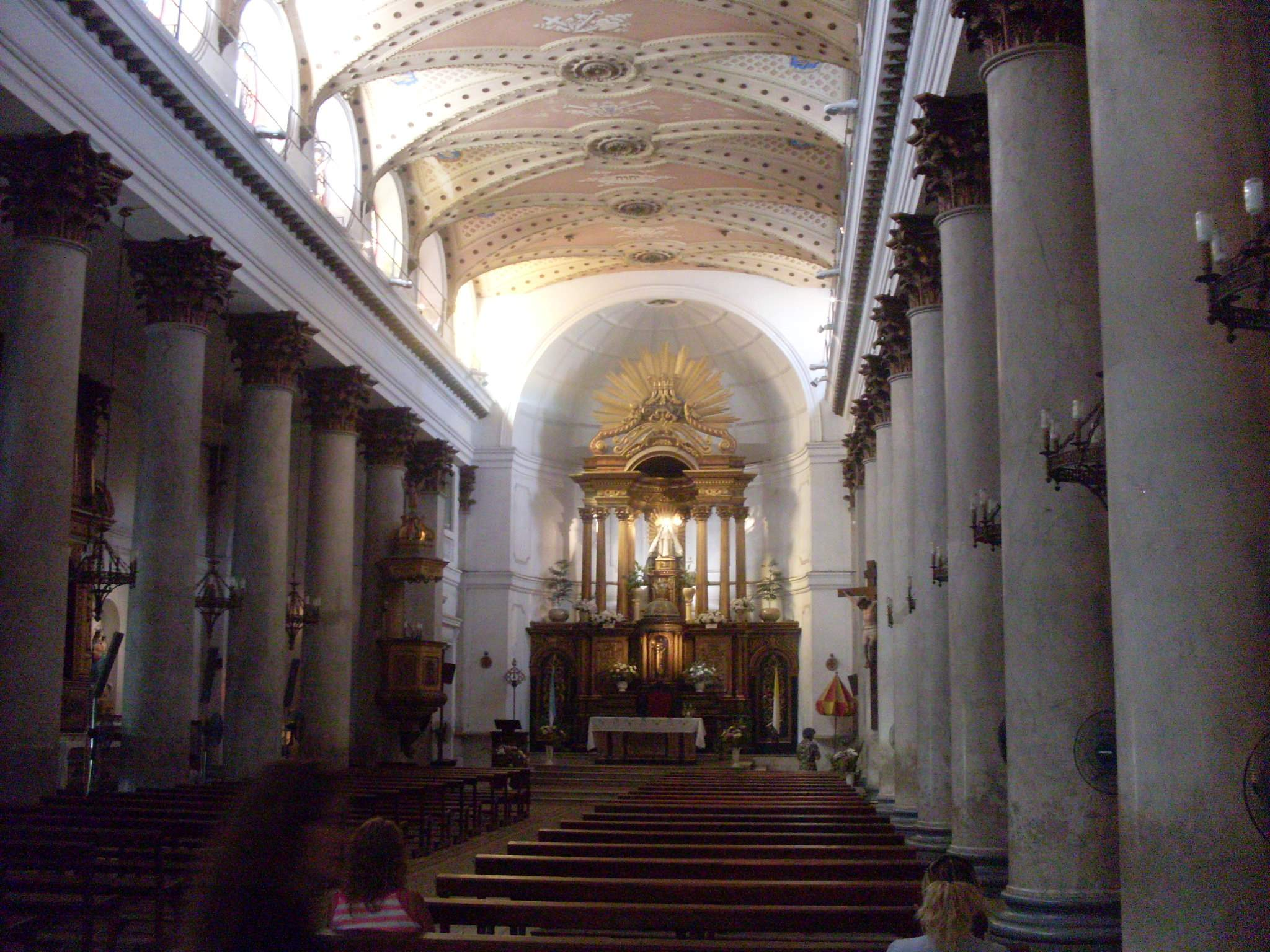
Interior of the Catedral Basílica.

Catedral Basílica Inmaculada Concepción del Buen Viaje is located in Morón, Buenos Aires Province, Argentina. It is the seat of the Diocese of Morón and is dedicated to the Virgin of the Immaculate Conception of Good Voyage. It was completed in 1885.

== History ==
The parish at Morón was established in 1730, with a church being built on the site of the modern cathedral in 1776. In 1852, the church, being deemed too small, was torn down to create a second cathedral, which would last for a little over a decade.

The third and final cathedral would be constructed in the years after the completion of the third temple. On July 31, 1868, parish priest Francisco Romero, who had built the second cathedral, laid the foundation stone for the third cathedral. The church would open to worshippers in 1871, however construction would continue until 1885. The church was consecrated on August 14, 1944, and the canonical coronation of the church's patron saint was held in 1947. In 1957, the church was elevated to the status of a cathedral by Pope Pius XII, and it was declared a minor basilica by Pope John Paul II, who would visit the cathedral in 1982. In 1998, an area of the church was established as a site to store the church's archives, as well as various items dating back to the parish's founding in the 18th century.

== Features ==
A 1,085-tube organ from Germany was commissioned for the cathedral, however its production was delayed due to the onset of the First World War and the rationing of metals in Germany. In 1918 negotiations for the organ began again and it was brought to the cathedral in 1921.

The cathedral's clock is French, located on the church tower's east side. Historically, the clock tower gave time in the city. During an election in 1930, in order to prevent the ruling party to win, a priest in the tower set the clock back an hour to prevent voting to occur before the set deadline. Due to mechanical faults, the clock was removed from the tower in 1998 and would not be re-added until 2018, 20 years later.
