= Carlos Alberto Prates Correia =

Brazilian screenwriter and film director (1941–2023)

- Born: 28 September 1941; Montes Claros, Minas Gerais, Brazil
- Died: 27 May 2023 (aged 81); Rio de Janeiro, Brazil
- Occupation: Filmmaker

Carlos Alberto Prates Correia (28 September 1941 – 28 May 2023) was a Brazilian screenwriter and film director.

== Life and career ==
Born in Montes Claros, Prates Correia started his career in 1965 directing the short film O Milagre em Lourdes, and then serving as assistant director of Cinema Novo author Joaquim Pedro de Andrade. He made his feature film in 1970, with the film Crioulo Doido. The main topic of his cinema was the conflict between traditions and modernization in Minas Gerais. His best known film is Cabaret Mineiro, which won the awards for best film, direction, actor (Nelson Dantas), supporting actress (Tânia Alves), cinematography, editing and music score at the 1981 edition of the Festival de Gramado. Following the dissolvement of Embrafilme in 1990, Prates Correia was not able to fund any project until 2007, when he directed his last film Castelar e Nelson Dantas no País dos Generais, a documentary which was awarded best film at the 2008 Festival de Gramado.

Prates Correia died of heart attack on 27 May 2023, at the age of 81.
