= Luis Chamizo =

Spanish writer

Luis Florencio Chamizo Trigueros (Guareña (Badajoz), 7 November 1894 –Madrid, 24 December 1945) was a Spanish writer in Castilian and "Castúo", a dialect in Extremadura. He was born within a humble family and he started writing poems secretly.

He went later to Madrid and Seville, where he graduated from a high school and a commercial school. After finishing studies in law, he returned to his native village.

In 1921 he moved to Guadalcanal (Seville), where he met his future wife and the mother of his five daughters, Virtudes Cordo Nogales.

In 1924 he was elected, accidentally, mayor of Guadalcanal and was chosen as a member of the Real Academia de Buenas Letras.

== Bibliography ==
- El Miajón de los Castúos (1921)
- Las Brujas (1932)
- Extremadura (1932)
- Obra Poética Completa (1967)
