= Morón, Buenos Aires =

City in Buenos Aires Province, Argentina

Morón
- City
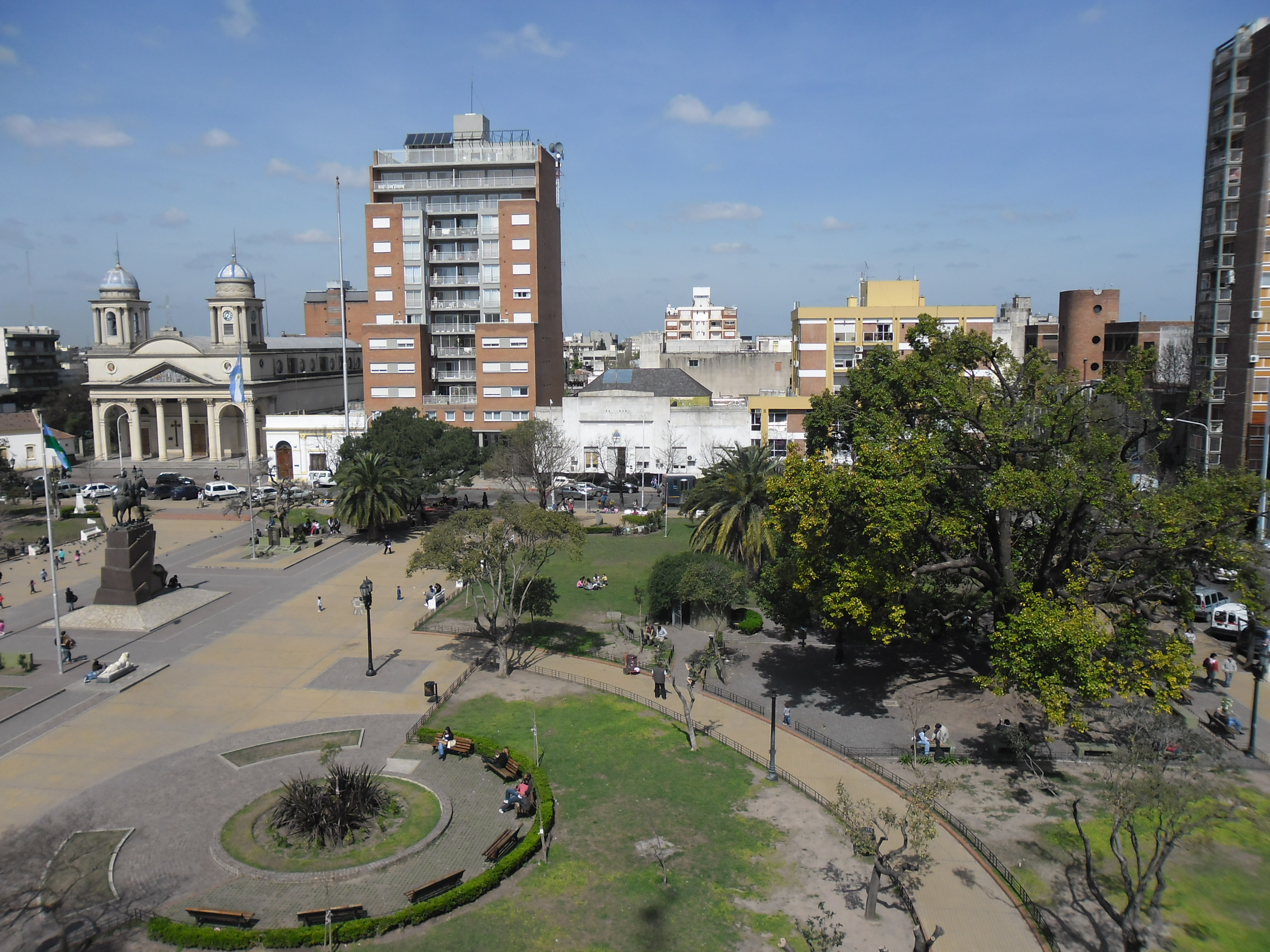
- Plaza San Martín with the Cathedral of Morón

- Location in Greater Buenos Aires
- Coordinates: 34°39′S 58°37′W
- Country: Argentina
- Province: Buenos Aires
- Partido: Morón

Government
  - Intendant: Lucas Ghi (PJ)
- Elevation: 26 m (85 ft)

Population (2001 census [INDEC])
  - Total: 92,725
- CPA Base: B 1708
- Area code: +54 11

Morón (Spanish pronunciation: [moˈɾon]) is a city in the Argentine province of Buenos Aires, capital of the Morón partido, located in the Greater Buenos Aires metropolitan area, at 34°39′S 58°37′W. Located 20 km (13 mi) west of Downtown Buenos Aires, Morón is easily reached via bus along Avenida Rivadavia, via National Highway 7, and the Sarmiento railway line.

== History ==
=== Early history ===
The location, which was originally settled by the Querandí people, was deeded in the late 16th century by Captain Juan de Garay to Captain Juan Ruiz de Ocaña. The site later became a stop along the Camino Real from Buenos Aires to Córdoba, particularly after the construction of a pontoon bridge over the Morón Brook by Pedro Márquez in 1771. Cañada de Morón was officially established in 1785, and the village became a popular vacation spot for wealthy residents from Buenos Aires and other nearby towns. Francisco de Merlo, namesake of the city of Merlo to the west, became the area's principal landowner at the time. No consensus exists among historians as to the origin of the city's name. Possible namesakes include: Diego Morón, whose widow, Isabel Torres Briseño, was one of the area's landowners in the 18th century; Pedro Morán, another local landowner; the town of Morón de la Frontera, in Andalucia, Spain, from which many of the town's first residents originated; and San Pedro de Morón, the patron saint of a local doyenne at the time.

The Battle of Márquez Bridge took place at the site in 1829. A pivotal engagement in the era's Argentine civil wars between Unitarians and Federalists, it resulted in a victory for the Federalists under Juan Manuel de Rosas and the Governor of Santa Fe Province, Estanislao López, over General Juan Lavalle, who was forced to relinquish the governorship he had usurped five months earlier; Rosas' dominion over Buenos Aires Province would continue until 1852.

=== Recent history ===
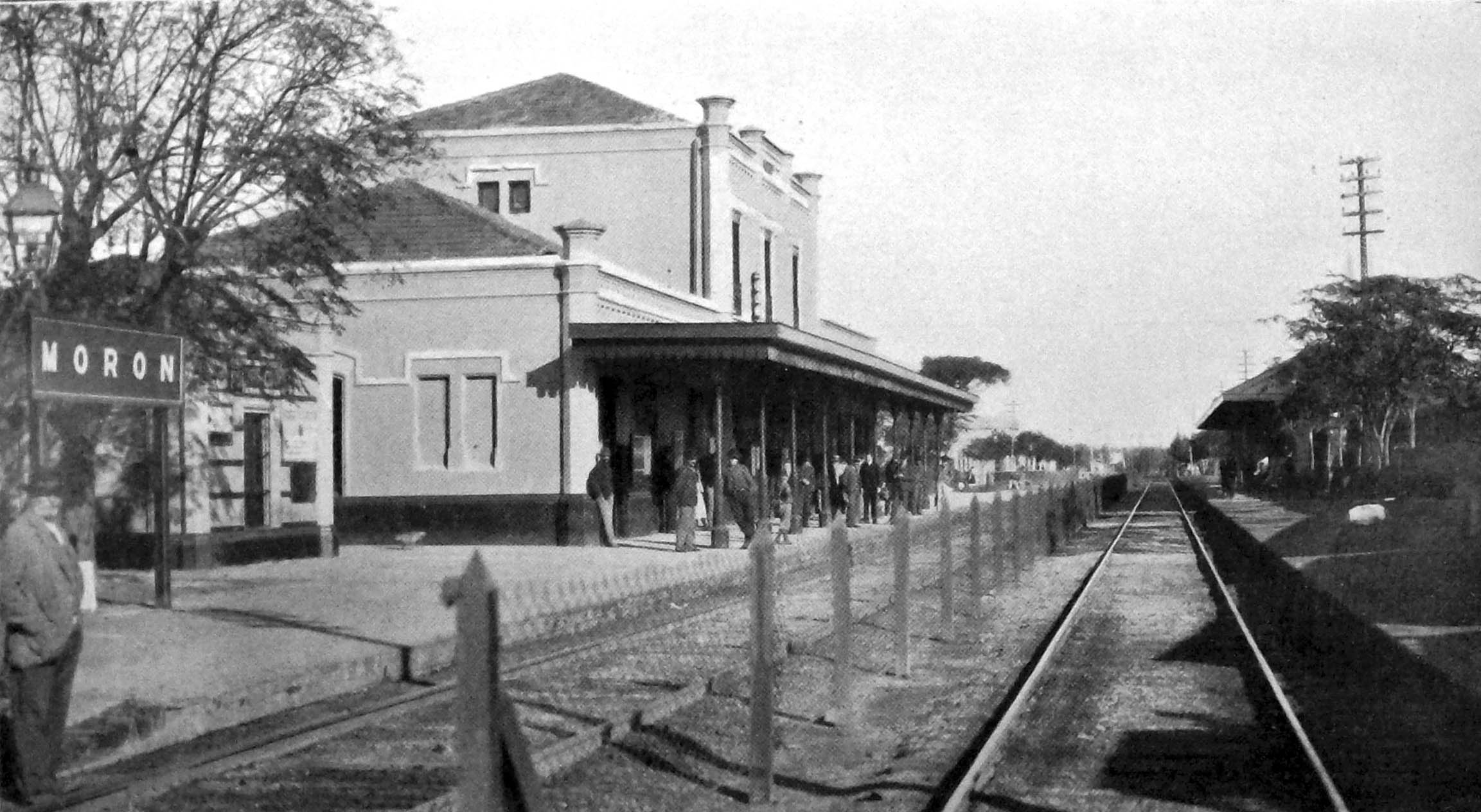
The old Western Railway station

.

Wheat farms began to displace cattle ranches around Morón in the 1850s, and in 1859, the Buenos Aires Western Railway reached the town. Foreseeing accelerated growth, the local gentry in 1859 commissioned urbanist Pedro Benoit to create its master plan. A large population of Italians settled in Morón subsequently, and in 1867, this community founded the local Mutual Aid Society; Italy would later open a consulate in the city. The Cathedral of Inmaculada Concepción del Buen Viaje was opened for mass in 1871, and completed in 1885. A small Jewish community also settled here.

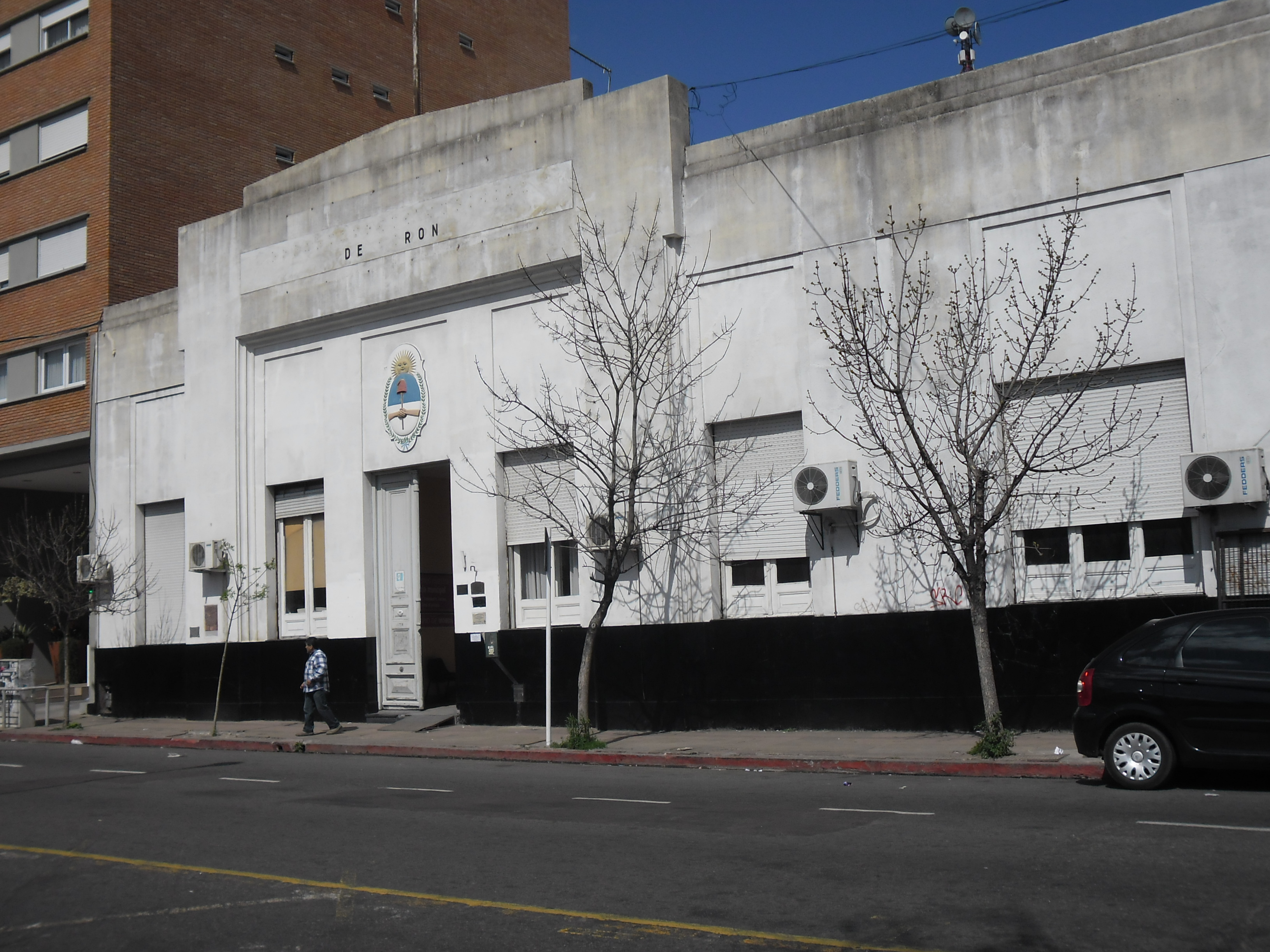
Historic City Hall, in use as such until 1948.

Morón was the site of a Radical Civic Union uprising in 1893, during which the National Autonomist Party city government was briefly deposed before federal troops restored the latter to office. The Rationalist City Hall, designed by Alejandro Bustillo and adorned with sculptures and bas-reliefs by José Fioravanti, was completed in 1939. Growth in the manufacturing sector led to the city's tripling in population between the 1947 and 1960 censuses, and in 1960, the private Universidad de Morón was established. Population growth subsequently slowed, and Morón acquired a suburban, largely middle class profile. The city was again in the eye of a political storm when, in 1989, Mayor Juan Carlos Rousselot of the Justicialist Party was impeached on corruption charges by the UCR-dominated City Council; Rousselot was returned to office by voters in 1991. Former Councilwoman Margarita Stolbizer and former Mayor Martín Sabbatella (1999 to 2009) both became prominent in national politics.

== Main sights ==
Among the most notable attractions in Morón are the central square designed by Benoit, Plaza Libertador San Martín, the cathedral, seat of the Roman Catholic Bishop of Morón, and the National Aeronautics Museum (Museo Nacional de Aeronáutica) of the Argentine Air Force. Deportivo Morón, the local association football team, was established in 1947.

== Notable people ==
The city is the birthplace of numerous notable figures in Argentine sports, culture, and history, including auto rally champions Diego and Oscar Aventín; the last dictator of Argentina, General Reynaldo Bignone; humorist Diego Capusotto; Congressmen Martín Sabbatella and Margarita Stolbizer; and Academy Award-winning composer Gustavo Santaolalla. The footballer Cristian Daniel Ledesma and the musician Milo J were also born in Morón.

== Gallery ==
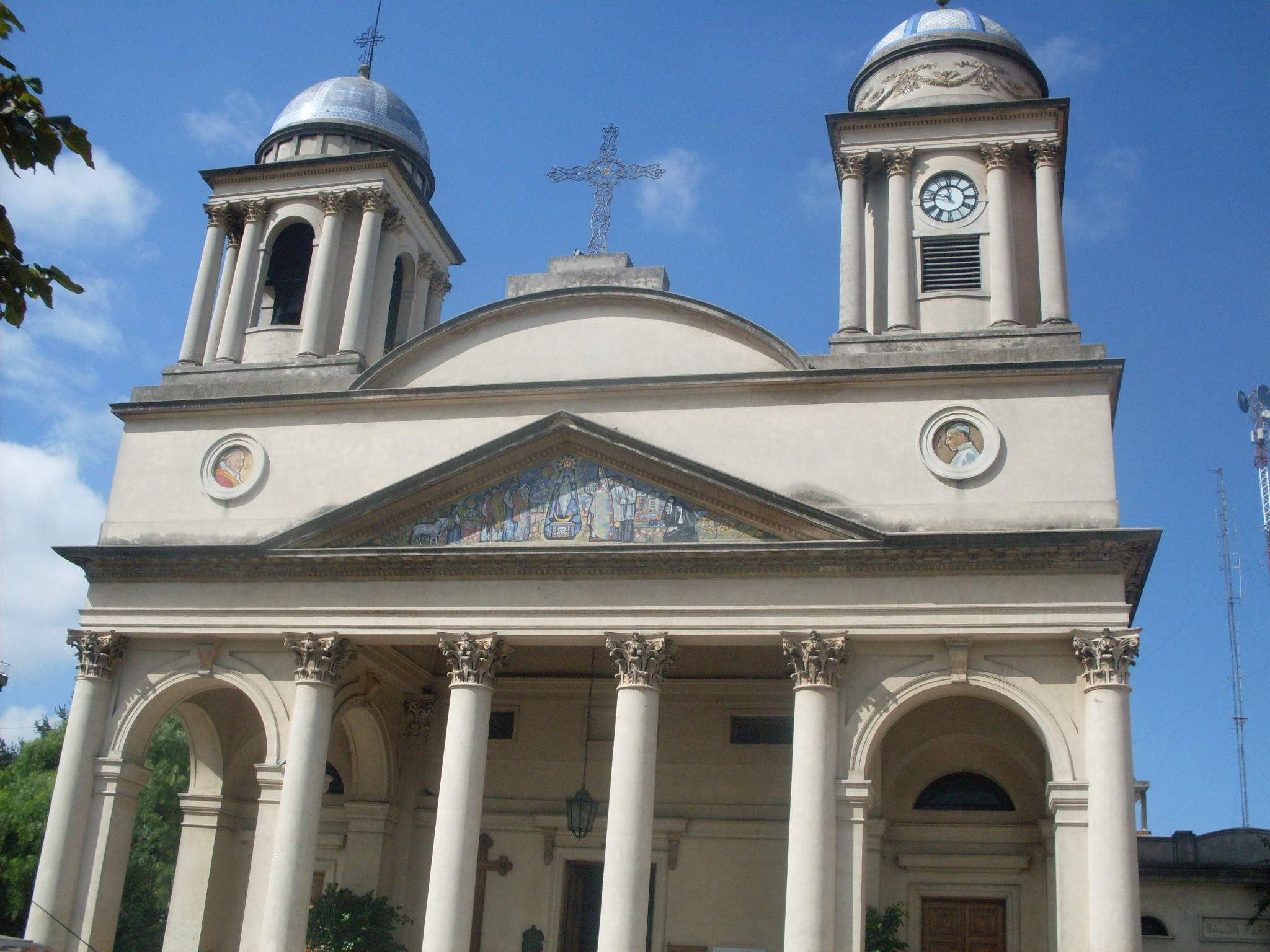
Catedral Basílica Inmaculada Concepción del Buen Viaje

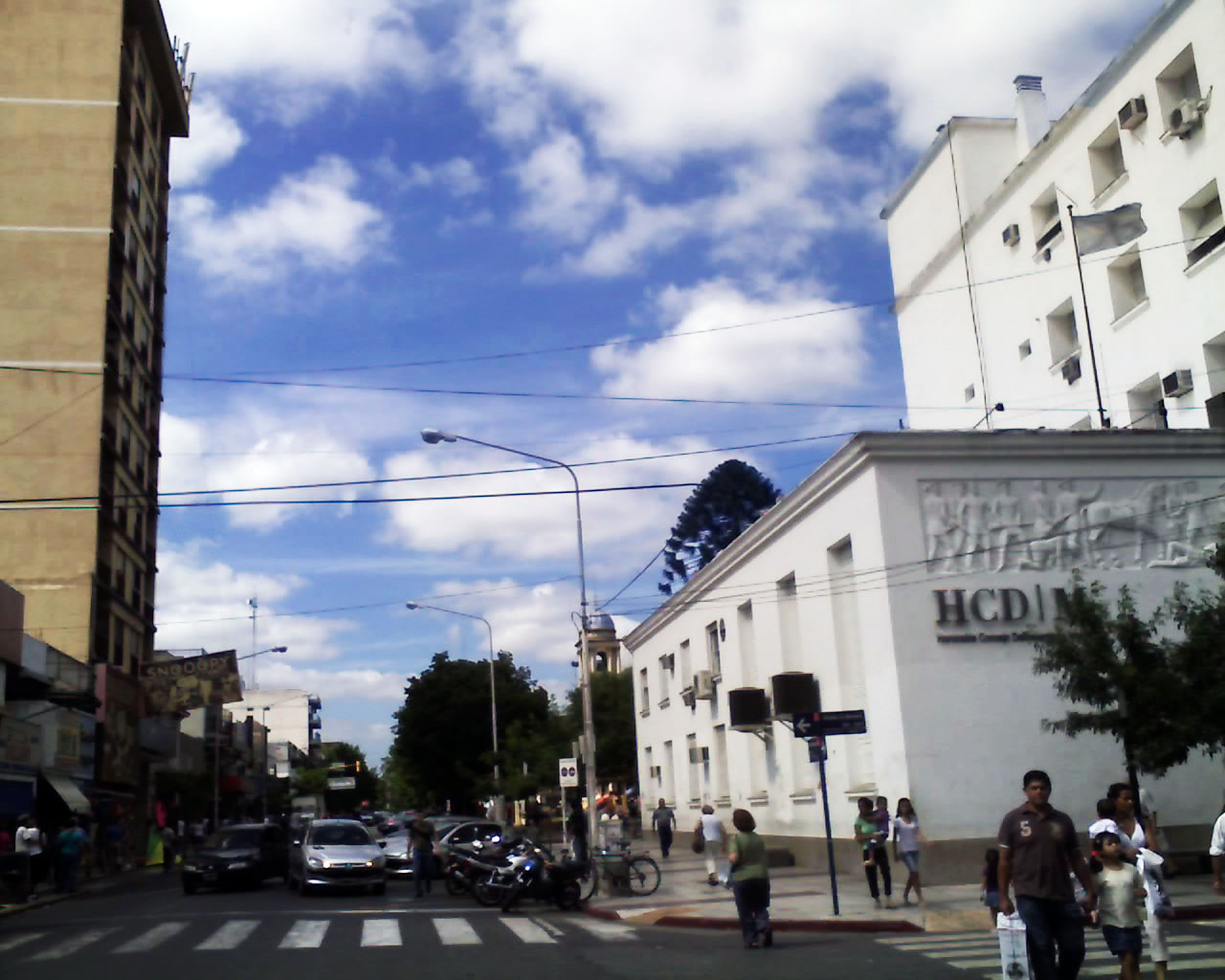
Belgrano Street

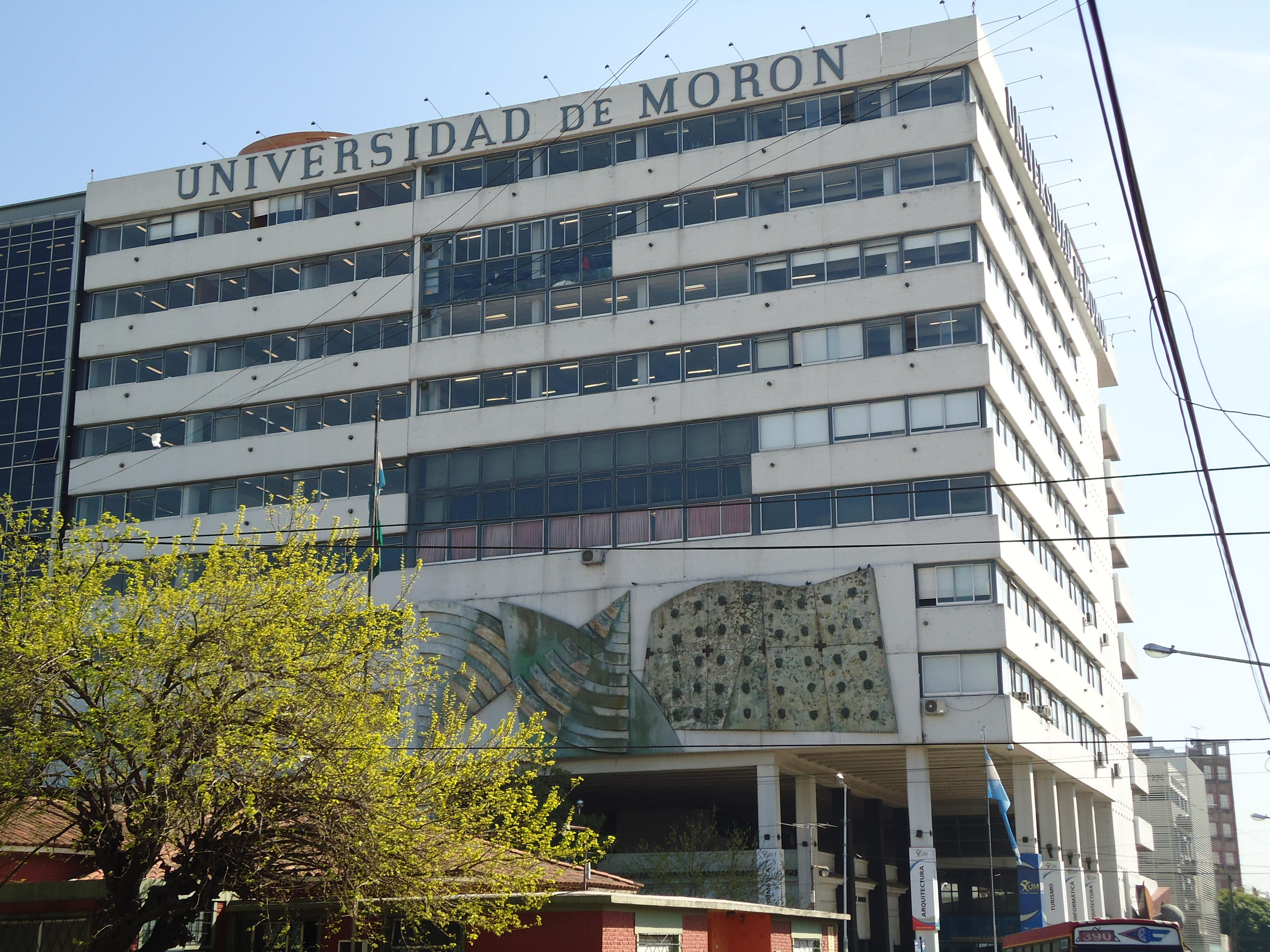
University of Morón

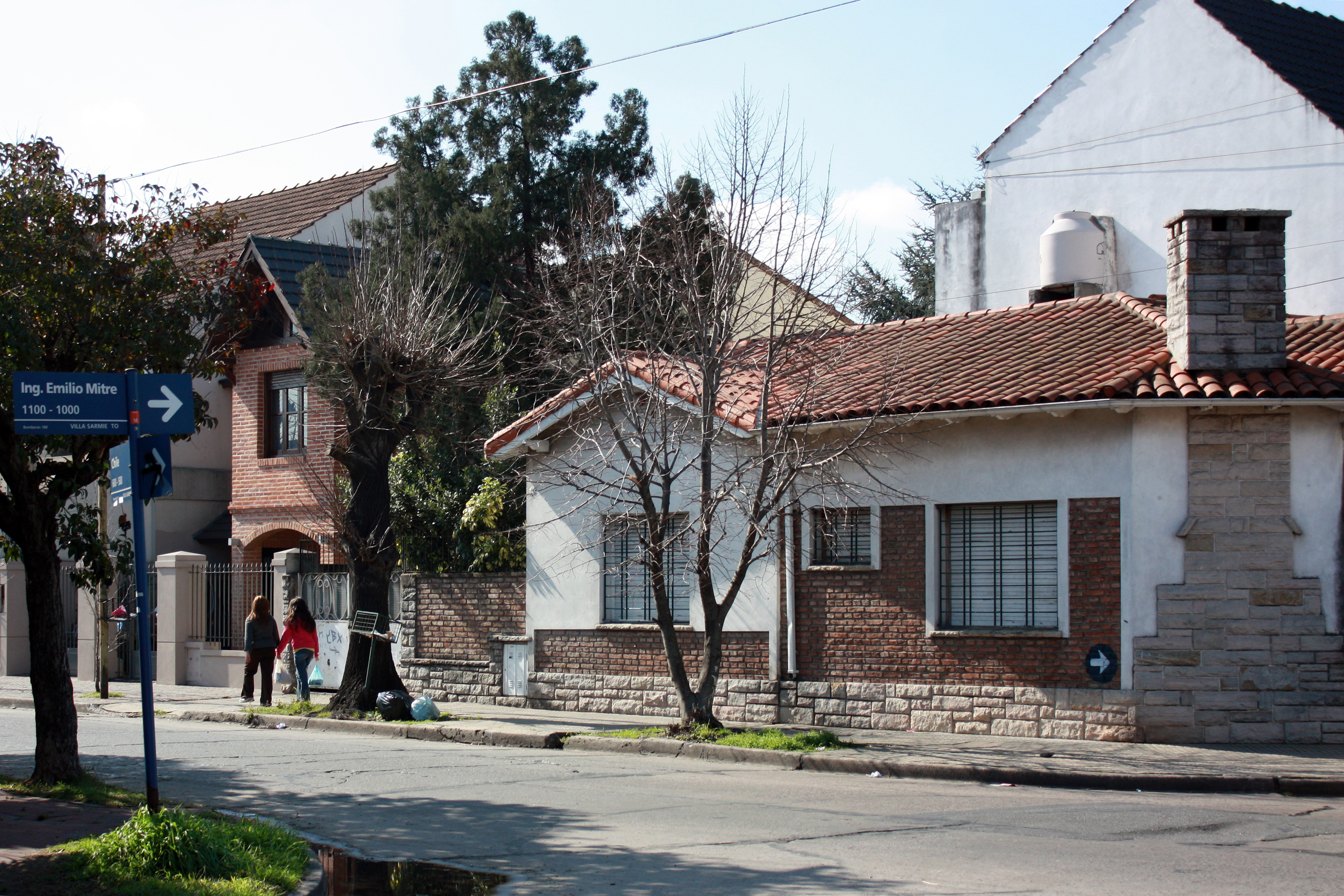
Villa Sarmiento
