= Guareña =

- Municipality
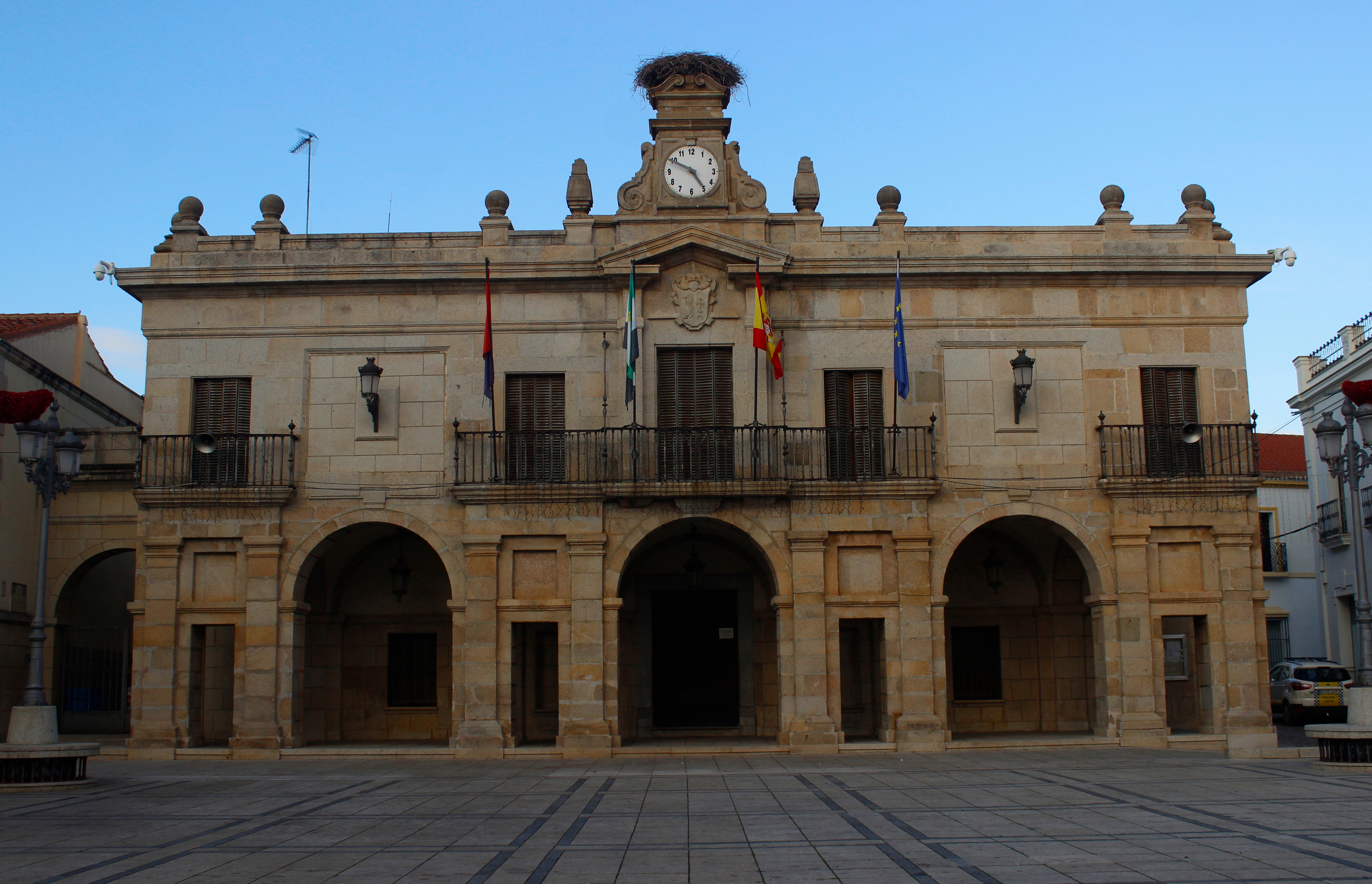

- Coat of arms

- Location of Guareña within Extremadura
- Coordinates: 38°51′36″N 6°6′6″W
- Country: Spain
- Autonomous Community: Extremadura
- Province: Badajoz
- Comarca: Las Vegas Altas

Government
  - Mayor: Abel González Ramiro

Area
  - Total: 283.3 km^{2} (109.4 sq mi)
- Elevation (AMSL): 285 m (935 ft)

Population (2025-01-01)
  - Total: 6,665
  - Density: 23.53/km^{2} (60.93/sq mi)
- Time zone: UTC+1 (CET)
  - Summer (DST): UTC+2 (CEST (GMT +2))
- Postal code: 06470
- Area code: +34 (Spain) + 924 (Badajoz)
- Website: www.guarena.es

Guareña is a Spanish municipality in the province of Badajoz, Extremadura. It has a population of 7,326 (2007) and an area of 283.3 km^{2} (109.4 sq mi).

== People from Guareña ==
- Luis Chamizo Trigueros (1894 – 1945) was a Spanish writer in Castilian and "Castúo", a dialect in Extremadura.

== See also ==
- List of municipalities in Badajoz
