= Castela (disambiguation) =

Castela may refer to:

- Castela, a genus of thorny shrubs and small trees in the family Simaroubaceae
- Castela (grape), a Portuguese wine grape
- a neighborhood in Piraeus, Greece
