= Castelão =

Castelao may refer to:

People

- Alfonso Daniel Rodríguez Castelao, Galician politician, writer, painter and doctor
- Ofelia Rey Castelao (b. 1956), Galician historian, writer, and university professor

Association football stadiums nicknamed Castelão

- Castelão (Maranhão) (Estádio Governador João Castelo), located in São Luís, Maranhão, Brazil
- Castelão (Ceará) (Estádio Plácido Aderaldo Castelo), located in Fortaleza, Ceará, Brazil

Other

- Castelão (grape), a Portuguese wine grape grown in the Bairrada DOC and other regions.
