= Armando Castelar =

Brazilian economist (born 1955)

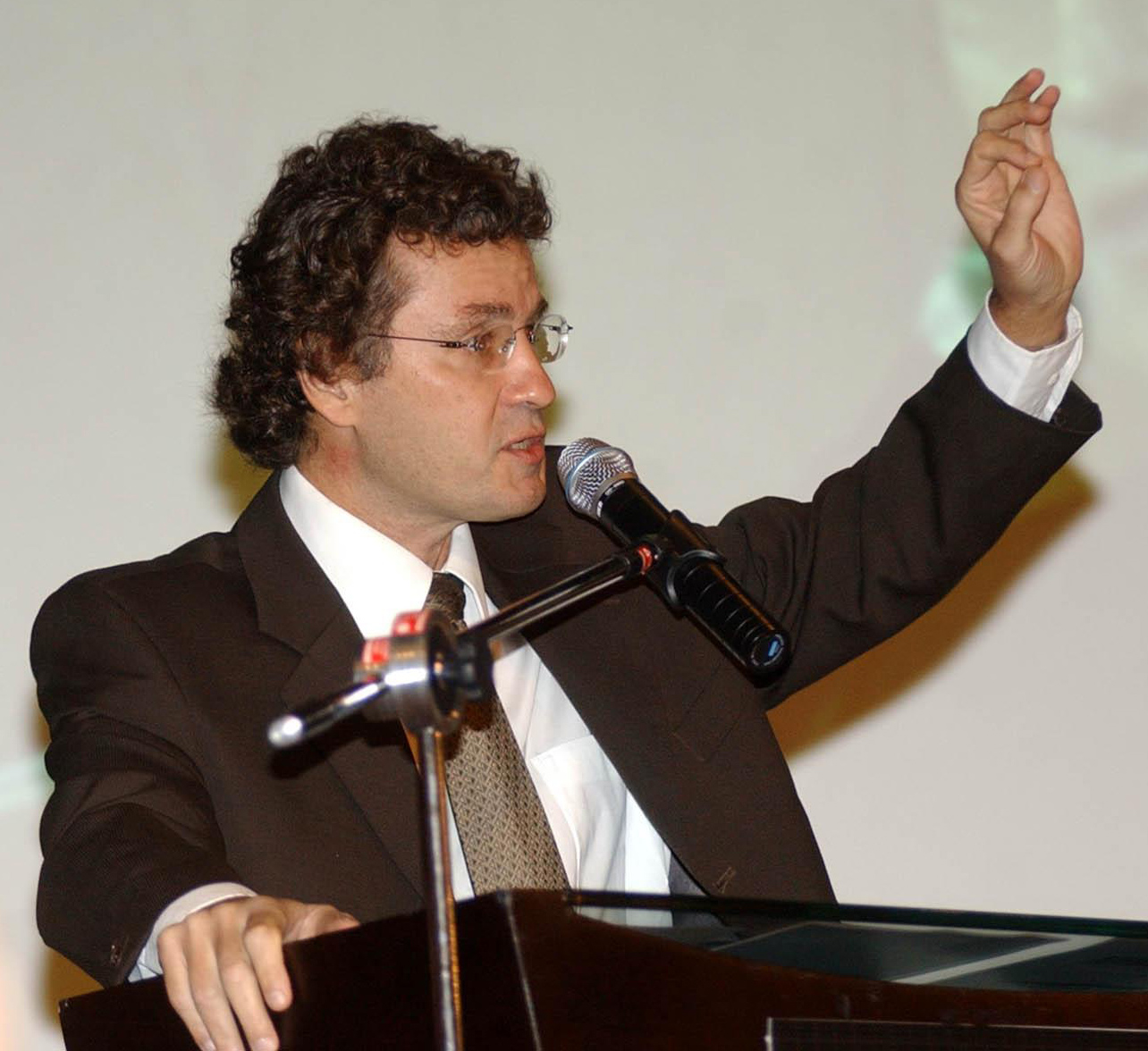
Armando Castelar

Armando Castelar (born 5 November 1955 in Rio de Janeiro, Brazil) is a Brazilian economist who was Head of the Economics Department of the Brazilian Development Bank (BNDES) for eight years, leading the Bank's research work and advising the Executive Board on macroeconomic issues. He is also a former analyst of Arminio Fraga and his Gávea Investimentos. Since 2010 he has been Coordinator of Applied Economic Research at Instituto Brasileiro de Economia (IBRE)/Fundação Getúlio Vargas (FGV), Brazil's leading think tank, and Professor of Economics at the Federal University of Rio de Janeiro.

== Background ==
Castelar earned a Ph.D. in Economics (University of California, Berkeley), Master's degrees in Statistics (IMPA) and Business Administration (COPPEAD) and a bachelor's degree in Electronic Engineering (ITA).

His current research focuses on macroeconomics, infrastructure regulation, national development banks, and financial services, although past work included studies about financial service firms in Brazil and other emerging economies, privatization, law and economics, and development economics.
