= Castellar de la Muela =

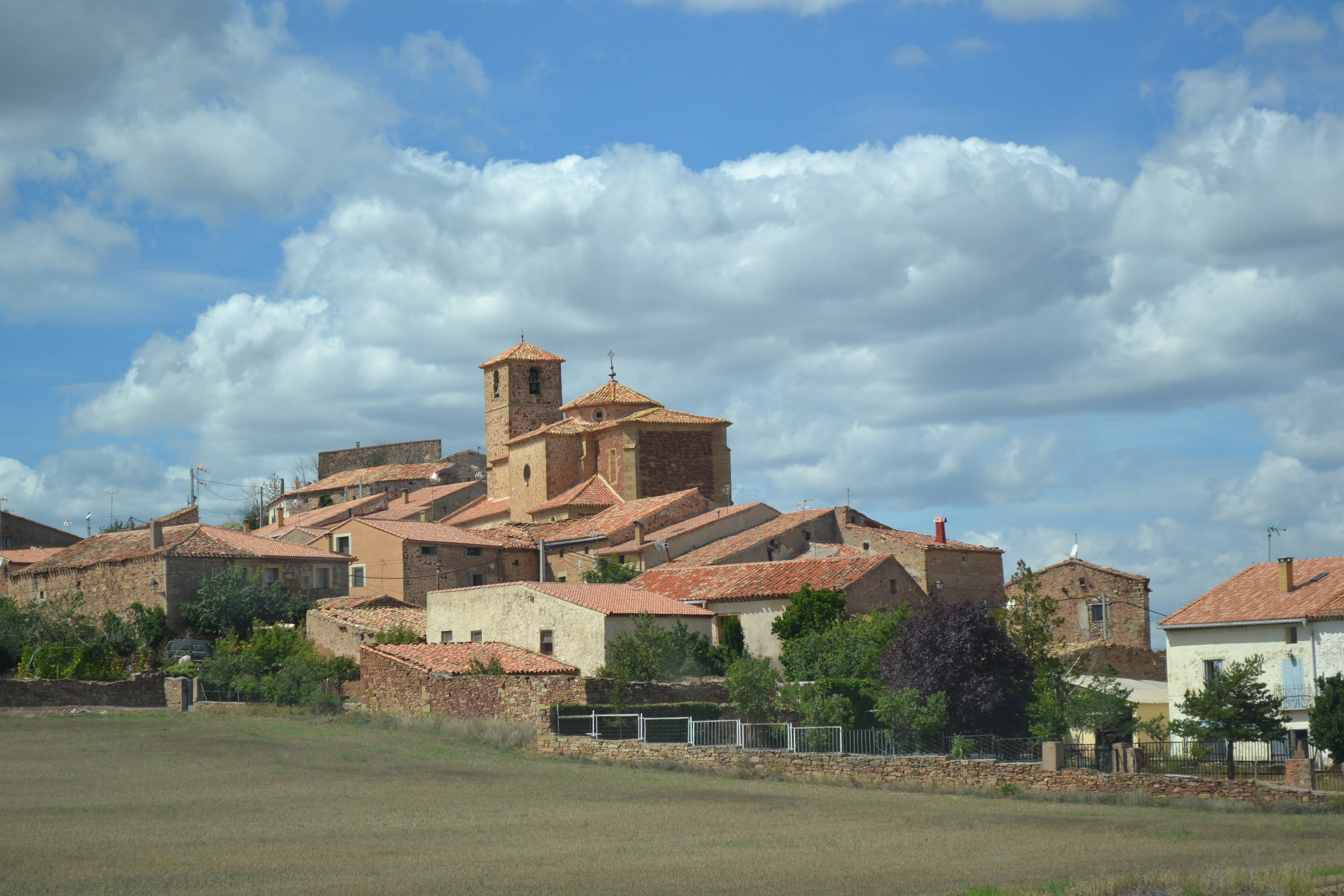

- Location in Spain. Castellar de la Muela (Castilla-La Mancha) Castellar de la Muela (Spain)
- Coordinates: 40°49′08″N 1°45′34″W
- Country: Spain
- Autonomous community: Castile-La Mancha
- Province: Guadalajara
- Comarca: Señorío de Molina - Alto Tajo

Government
  - Mayor: Manuel Mingote Torres

Area
  - Total: 21.38 km^{2} (8.25 sq mi)

Population (2025-01-01)
  - Total: 22
  - Density: 1.0/km^{2} (2.7/sq mi)
- Time zone: UTC+1 (CET)
  - Summer (DST): UTC+2 (CEST)

Castellar de la Muela is a municipality located in the province of Guadalajara, Castile-La Mancha, Spain.
