= Morón Partido =

Morón Partido de Morón
- Department
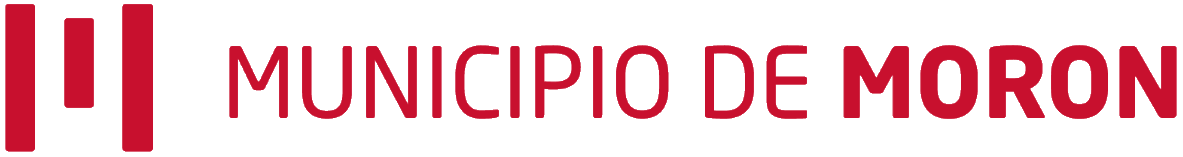
- Logo

- location of Morón Partido in Gran Buenos Aires
- Coordinates: 34°39′S 58°37′W
- Country: Argentina
- Established: 1874
- Seat: Morón

Government
  - Intendant: Lucas Ghi (New Encounter)

Area
  - Total: 52 km^{2} (20 sq mi)

Population
  - Total: 319,934
  - Density: 6,200/km^{2} (16,000/sq mi)
- Demonym: moronense
- Postal Code: B1708
- IFAM: BUE086
- Area Code: 011
- Website: www.moron.gob.ar

Morón is a partido (second level administrative division) of the Buenos Aires Province, Argentina. Located in the Greater Buenos Aires urban area, its head town is Morón which is located around 17 km (11 mi) from Buenos Aires.

The provincial subdivision has a population of 319,934 inhabitants in an area of 52 km^{2} (20 sq mi).

== Districts ==
- Morón
- Castelar
- Haedo
- El Palomar
- Villa Sarmiento
