= Castellar, Aguilar de Segarra =

Singular population entity in Spain

Castellar
- Singular population entity
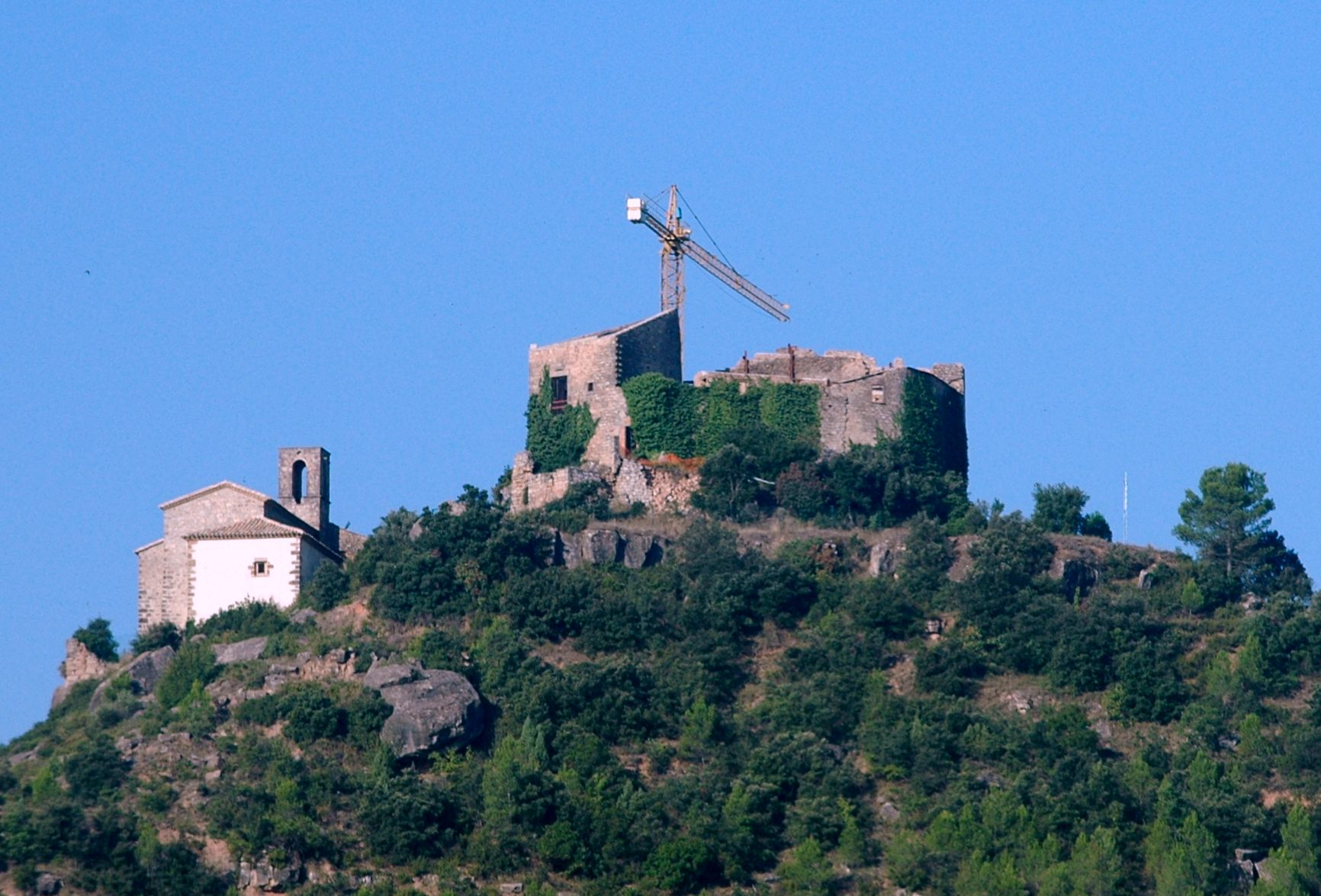
- Castle of Castellar

- Location within Spain Location within Catalonia Location within Province of Barcelona
- Coordinates: 41°43′44.2″N 1°39′14.7″E
- Country: Spain
- A. community: Catalunya
- Province: Barcelona
- Municipality: Aguilar de Segarra

Population (January 1, 2024)
  - Total: 78
- Time zone: UTC+01:00
- Postal code: 08256
- MCN: 08002000200

Castellar is a singular population entity in the municipality of Aguilar de Segarra, in Catalonia, Spain.

As of 2024 it has a population of 78 people.
