= Castelar e Nelson Dantas no País dos Generais =

2007 film directed by Carlos Alberto Prates Correia

- Directed by: Carlos Alberto Prates Correia
- Written by: Carlos Alberto Prates Correia
- Starring: Tavinho Moura; Priscila Assum; Rafaela Amado
- Distributed by: RioFilme
- Release date: 27 October 2007 (Brazil)
- Running time: 73 minutes
- Country: Brazil
- Language: Portuguese

Castelar e Nelson Dantas no País dos Generais (English: Castelar and Nelson Dantas Country of Generals) is a 2007 Brazilian documentary film directed by Carlos Alberto Prates Correia.

== Synopsis ==
The film is a multifaceted account in which the director's cinematic reminiscences blend with a fictional narrative, establishing a different genre in which document and fiction intertwine under the baton of irony.

== Cast ==
- Tavinho Moura ...Schubert
- Priscila Assum ...Noeme
- Rafaela Amado ...Lollô
- Andrea Dantas ...narrator
- Lina de Carlo ...Prisoner
- Regina Coelho ...Lyric singer)
- Leilany Fernandes ...Torturer
- Joaquim Pedro de Andrade ...Himself (archive image)
- Alberto Graça ...Himself (archive image)
- Schubert Magalhães ...Himself (archive image)
- Humberto Mauro ...Himself (archive image)
- Carlos Alberto Prates Correia ...Himself (archive image)
- Andrea Tonacci ...Himself (archive image)

== Accolades ==
The film won two awards at 2007 Gramado Film Festival including Best Picture.
