= 2013 Castelar rail accident =

Railway accident in Argentina

2013 Castelar rail disaster
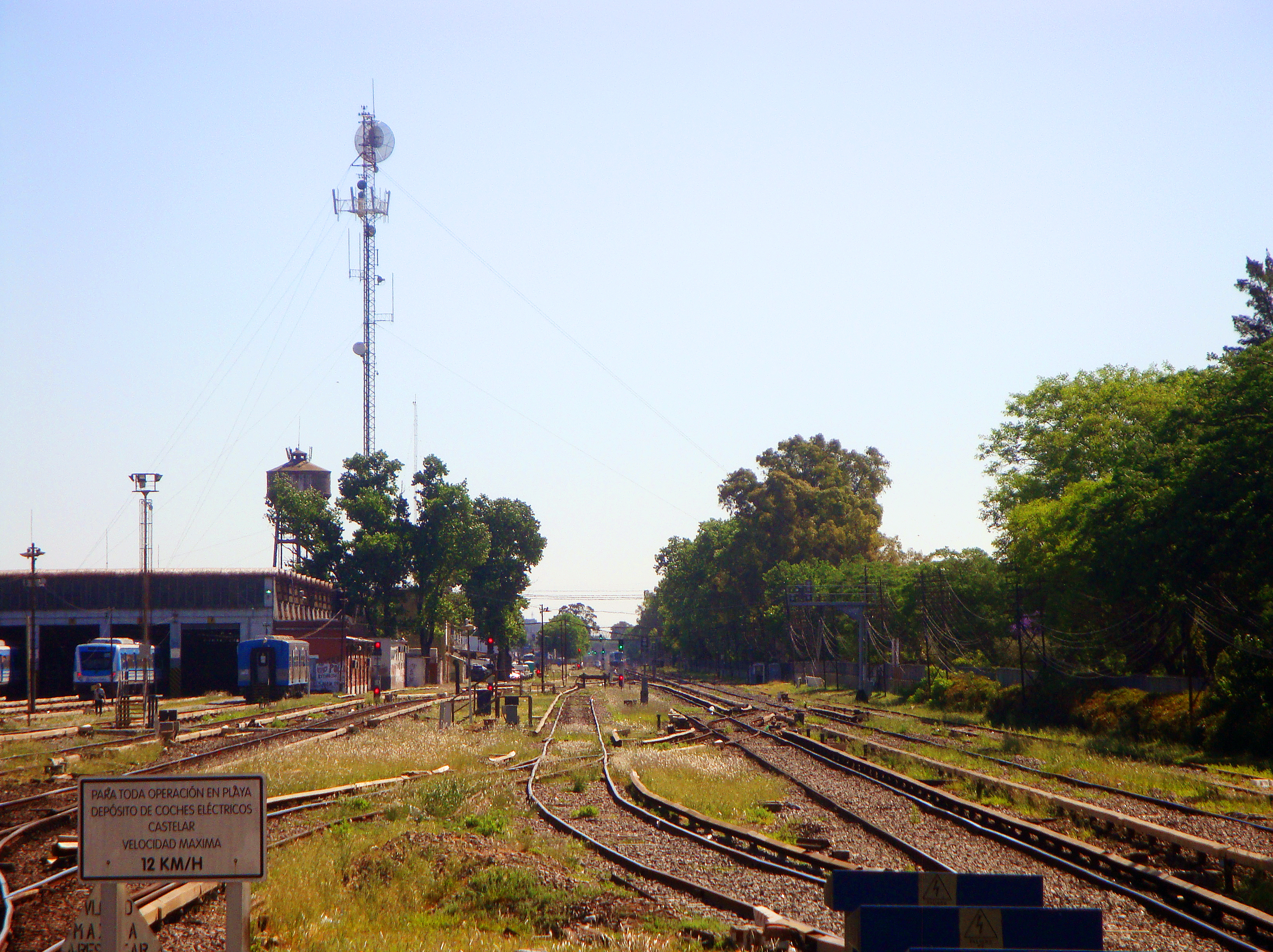
- The accident occurred near Castelar train station

Details
- Date: 13 June 2013; 07:30 (10:30 UTC)
- Location: Castelar, Greater Buenos Aires
- Coordinates: 34°39′01″S 58°38′11″W
- Country: Argentina
- Incident type: Rear-end Collision
- Cause: To the driver of 1, human error

Statistics
- Trains: 2
- Passengers: 1,000
- Crew: 2 (1 on each train)
- Deaths: 3
- Injured: 315

The 2013 Castelar rail disaster occurred on 13 June 2013 at about 07:30 local time (10:30 UTC), in the Castelar neighborhood of Morón Partido in Greater Buenos Aires area, about 30km (19 miles) west of the city of Buenos Aires, Argentina.

A passenger train travelling in the morning rush hour hit a stationary train that was empty. At least 3 people were killed and another 315 were injured. This crash took place on the Sarmiento line between Once railway station and Moreno, the same line which was the scene of the 2012 Buenos Aires rail disaster.

Following official investigations which determined that the brakes were in working order and that the driver sped through three warning signals without attempting to apply them, the driver, Daniel López, was formally charged with negligent homicide on October 2.
