= Castelar =

City in Buenos Aires Province, Argentina

- City

- Location in Greater Buenos Aires
- Coordinates: 34°40′S 58°40′W
- Country: Argentina
- Province: [Image:Bandera de la Provincia de Buenos Aires.svg
- Partido: Morón
- Declared city: 1971
- Elevation: 28 m (92 ft)

Population (2001 census [INDEC])
  - Total: 104,019
- CPA Base: B 1712
- Area code: +54 11

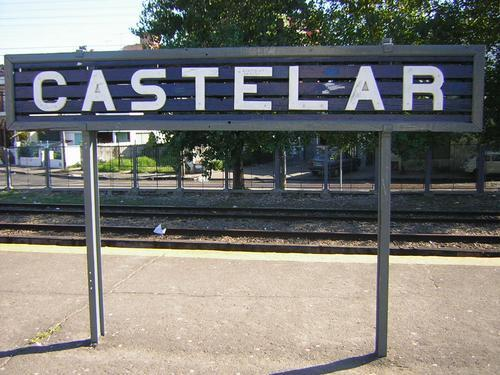
Castelar train station

Castelar is a city in Morón Partido (county), Buenos Aires Province, Argentina, some 30 km west of the nation's capital, the autonomous city of Buenos Aires. It is part of the Greater Buenos Aires metropolitan area.

Castelar is the westernmost city of the Morón Partido, and borders on Ituzaingó Partido.

It is the second most populated city in Morón, and it's located in the western side of it.

== Climate ==
Climate data for Castelar (1991–2020, extremes 1961–present)
Month	Jan	Feb	Mar	Apr	May	Jun	Jul	Aug	Sep	Oct	Nov	Dec	Year
Record high °C (°F)	42.6 (108.7)	39.2 (102.6)	36.3 (97.3)	32.5 (90.5)	29.8 (85.6)	27.2 (81.0)	31.1 (88.0)	29.7 (85.5)	34.0 (93.2)	35.4 (95.7)	38.0 (100.4)	38.9 (102.0)	42.6 (108.7)
Mean daily maximum °C (°F)	29.9 (85.8)	28.6 (83.5)	26.6 (79.9)	22.7 (72.9)	18.9 (66.0)	15.9 (60.6)	15.1 (59.2)	17.6 (63.7)	19.4 (66.9)	22.3 (72.1)	25.5 (77.9)	28.5 (83.3)	22.6 (72.7)
Daily mean °C (°F)	23.9 (75.0)	22.8 (73.0)	20.8 (69.4)	17.0 (62.6)	13.6 (56.5)	10.9 (51.6)	9.9 (49.8)	12.0 (53.6)	14.0 (57.2)	16.9 (62.4)	19.9 (67.8)	22.6 (72.7)	17.0 (62.6)
Mean daily minimum °C (°F)	18.2 (64.8)	17.5 (63.5)	15.6 (60.1)	11.9 (53.4)	8.9 (48.0)	6.2 (43.2)	5.4 (41.7)	6.8 (44.2)	8.7 (47.7)	11.5 (52.7)	13.9 (57.0)	16.4 (61.5)	11.7 (53.1)
Record low °C (°F)	7.0 (44.6)	5.9 (42.6)	2.7 (36.9)	1.4 (34.5)	−1.9 (28.6)	−6.3 (20.7)	−5.0 (23.0)	−2.5 (27.5)	−2.1 (28.2)	0.0 (32.0)	2.9 (37.2)	5.8 (42.4)	−6.3 (20.7)
Average precipitation mm (inches)	105.5 (4.15)	112.3 (4.42)	110.7 (4.36)	104.7 (4.12)	79.4 (3.13)	49.7 (1.96)	56.0 (2.20)	58.2 (2.29)	65.7 (2.59)	114.1 (4.49)	103.0 (4.06)	98.0 (3.86)	1,057.2 (41.62)
Average precipitation days (≥ 0.1 mm)	8.3	7.5	8.1	8.1	7.0	6.2	6.1	5.9	6.7	8.9	7.9	8.0	88.6
Average snowy days	0.0	0.0	0.0	0.0	0.0	0.0	0.1	0.0	0.0	0.0	0.0	0.0	0.1
Average relative humidity (%)	67.4	72.4	75.6	80.0	82.3	81.5	79.7	74.9	72.6	73.3	69.8	66.6	74.7
Mean monthly sunshine hours	291.4	245.8	232.5	192.0	167.4	144.0	155.0	182.9	192.0	226.3	258.0	288.3	2,575.6
Mean daily sunshine hours	9.4	8.7	7.5	6.4	5.4	4.8	5.0	5.9	6.4	7.3	8.6	9.3	7.0
Percentage possible sunshine	70	71	66	64	59	46	48	55	58	57	64	65	60
Source 1: Servicio Meteorológico Nacional (extremes 1961–present at Morón Airport and Air Base)
Source 2: UNLP (percent sun 1971–1980)

== Economy ==
The Sero electric factory is located in Castelar.

== History ==
The first owner of the land now known as Castelar was Mateo Sanchez, who received a squared portion of land laid upon Moron Creek ―the zone previously known as Cañada de Ruiz― according to the orders of the governor Juan Ramirez de Velasco. Surprisingly, the limits of that land were almost double the size of the current city. In 1610 the land suffered its first change of owner, since Mateo Sanchez had sold it to captain Francisco Romero from Santa Cruz. The lot continued to be in the hands of Romero's descendants until 1673, the year that Sebastian de Gilles acquired it, which led to a slow fragmenting of the land.

== Notable residents ==
- Daniel Guerrero - television and film actor, radio announcer and television show host
- Brian Smith - racing driver
- Eduardo Sacheri - writer
- Margarita Stolbizer - politician
- Nicolás Laprovíttola - basketball player
- Pedro Troglio - former football player
- Claudio Borghi - former football player
- Diego Capusotto - actor
- Nora Cortiñas - human rights activist
- Reynaldo Bignone - general and dictator

== See also ==
- 2013 Castelar train crash
