= Digital Statute for Children and Adolescents =

The Digital Statute for Children and Adolescents (Brazilian Portuguese: Estatuto Digital da Criança e do Adolescente), commonly known as the Felca Law (Brazilian Portuguese: Lei Felca) or the Digital ECA (Brazilian Portuguese: ECA Digital), is a set of regulations effective in Brazil aimed at protecting children and adolescents in digital environments. Established by Law No. 15,211/2025, it applies to information technology products and services intended for this audience or likely to be accessed by it, regardless of where they are developed or operated.

The law establishes principles for the use of information technology products and services by children and adolescents, including comprehensive protection, the absolute priority of their interests, safety from bullying, exploitation, abuse, and other forms of violence, respect for the individual's autonomy and progressive development, protection against commercial exploitation, the promotion of digital education, and transparency in the processing of personal data. The text also defines concepts such as social network, reward system, profiling, and parental supervision mechanisms, and stipulates that such products and services must, by default, operate with the highest level of privacy and personal data protection.

The legislation also provides for the removal of content that appears to involve sexual exploitation, sexual abuse, kidnapping, and grooming of children and adolescents, and for the reporting of such content to the competent authorities, as well as for the provision of reporting mechanisms. Service providers with more than 1 million users in this age group in Brazil must publish semiannual transparency reports. In the event of noncompliance, the law provides for a warning, a simple fine of up to 10 percent of the economic group's revenue in Brazil for the last fiscal year, or, in the absence of revenue, a fine of 10 to 1,000 reais per registered user, capped at 50 million reais per violation, in addition to temporary suspension or prohibition from conducting business activities.

== History ==
The Digital ECA originated from Bill No. 2628/2022, presented on 18 October 2022, by Senator Alessandro Vieira. In its initial processing in the Senate, the proposal went through the Human Rights and Participatory Legislation Committee, where it received a favorable opinion from Senator Flávio Arns in June 2023. In 2024, the text went through the Communication and Digital Law Committee, which held public hearings in May of that year; on 27 November 2024, the committee approved the matter.

In the Chamber of Deputies, the bill was received on 10 December 2024, and distributed to the committees on Communication; Social Security, Welfare, Childhood, Adolescence and Family; and Constitution and Justice and Citizenship. In 2025, requests were submitted for public hearings and for expedited processing. On 20 August 2025, the Chamber's Plenary approved the proposal with amendments, in the form of a substitute bill reported by Deputy Jadyel Alencar, which is why the text returned to the Senate for further deliberation. At the time of its processing, the United States was also discussing the Kids Online Safety Act (KOSA) proposal.

The Senate reconsidered the bill in August 2025. According to Agência Senado, support for the proposal intensified after public denunciations made by influencer Felca about cases of eroticization, exploitation, and abuse of minors on digital platforms. On August 27, 2025, the Senate Plenary approved the Chamber's substitute bill, and the bill went to the President for sanction. The law was enacted on 17 September 2025, as Law No. 15,211/2025, with a partial veto. Subsequently, Law No. 15,352, of 25 February 2026, amended the legislation to set the start of its validity on 17 March 2026.

== Content ==
Among the main points of the law are:

- The obligation for digital platforms to adopt design mechanisms aimed at preventing and mitigating risks for children and adolescents, including exposure to inappropriate content, harassment, and exploitation;
- The implementation of parental controls and accessible reporting channels;
- stricter rules for the collection and processing of data from children and adolescents.

== Impact ==
The approval received extensive coverage in the national press. The law was considered by some media outlets as a regulatory milestone related to the protection of children in the online environment.

However, the law divided opinions in the press, mainly regarding identity verification and possible suspensions of services that do not comply with the new rules, affecting online game servers, including the Rockstar Games Store and the Rockstar Games Launcher, which announced the closure of their activities on 17 March 2026, with Rockstar Games continuing to sell its products through partner companies in Brazil. With the law coming into effect on the 17th, social networks such as X, TikTok, YouTube, Discord, and Instagram began age verification services for sensitive content, but gradually, while other social networks had not yet implemented the requirement while awaiting the publication of the decree. Before that, Discord had sent its users a message in February informing them that servers with sensitive content would require verification. On pornographic websites, RedTube and Pornhub still maintained self-identification on the home screen.

Data leaks are a topic raised to criticize the implementation of the law, especially regarding sensitive Brazilian data, with some labeling it as a sell-out or citing digital sovereignty, as the main concern. Platforms like Discord have made widespread data collections, concerning their users.

Another controversy regarding the law arose with a possible ban on Linux in Brazil, which came to light through an article published on the TecMundo website on 13 March 2026, explaining the change in policies for the operating system in the country and also in the U.S states of Colorado, California, and New York. The issue raised in the article mainly involved the open-source system MidnightBSD. On the 17th, tests of Arch Linux 32 were suspended in Brazil by a decision of the developers.

On 23 March 2026, Felca was interviewed on the Roda Viva program, where he spoke about the legislation and the video he started. Felca mentions that when he published the video, he was unaware of the bill, which at that time was under consideration with no scheduled vote.

In April 2026, it was revealed that Hytalo Santos' defense attempted to use the law to overturn his conviction, claiming that the new law ensures freedom of cultural expression, invoking judicial retroactivity and arguing that the content refers to a peripheral manifestation linked to brega funk. He and Israel Nata Vicente are facing convictions for subjecting people to conditions analogous to slavery and human trafficking for sexual exploitation.

In a public consultation held in July 2026, Wikimedia Foundation and Wikimedia Brasil chapter called for an exemption of "digital public goods" like Wikimedia websites from the law. They cited three key fundamental differences of Wikimedia platforms from social media services: "neutral point of view versus personal opinions", "intentional access versus algorithmic viralization", and "absence of monetization".

== See also ==
- Adultification
- Statute of the Child and Adolescent
- Online Safety Amendment (Social Media Minimum Age) Act 2024
- Online Safety Act 2023
- Computer and network surveillance
- Internet privacy
- Internet safety
- Digital authoritarianism
