= 2017 Kids' Choice Awards =

Children's television awards show program broadcast in 2017

- Date: March 11, 2017
- Location: Galen Center; Los Angeles, California
- Hosted by: John Cena
- Most awards: Ghostbusters (3); Finding Dory (3); Kevin Hart (3)
- Most nominations: Justin Timberlake (7)

Television/radio coverage
- Network: Nickelodeon; Nick Radio
- Runtime: 90 minutes
- Viewership: 3.05 million
- Directed by: Glenn Weiss

The 30th Annual Nickelodeon Kids' Choice Awards was held on March 11, 2017, at the Galen Center on the University of Southern California campus in Los Angeles and was broadcast live on Nickelodeon and either live or with tape delay across all of Nickelodeon's international networks. John Cena hosted the ceremony.

A new episode of one of Nickelodeon's television series, Henry Danger, premiered right before the ceremony. Jace Norman subsequently led the transfer from the show to the ceremony. Afterwards, an unlisted airing of the Hunter Street premiere was shown.

== Hosts ==
- John Cena
- Daniella Monet and Meg DeAngelis (preshow)

== Performances ==
Artist(s)	Song(s)
Jacob Sartorius (Pre-Show)	"By Your Side"
Machine Gun Kelly; Camila Cabello	"Bad Things"
Little Mix	"Touch" "Shout Out to My Ex"

== Presenters ==
Celebrity (ies)	Presented
Gwen Stefani	Favorite Animated Movie
Demi Lovato	Preview of Smurfs: The Lost Village
Big Sean; Bethany Mota	Favorite TV Actress
Chris Pratt	Introduced Zoe Saldaña
Zoe Saldaña	Preview of Guardians of the Galaxy Vol. 2
Nat Wolff; Maddie Ziegler	Introduced Machine Gun Kelly and Camila Cabello
Gal Gadot; Chris Pine	Preview of Wonder Woman
John Stamos	Favorite Villain
Miranda Cosgrove	Favorite TV Show – Kids Show
Cast of School of Rock	Favorite Viral Music Artist
Dove Cameron; Noah Cyrus	Introduced Little Mix
Isabela Moner; Benjamin Flores Jr.	Preview of Transformers: The Last Knight; Favorite TV Show – Family Show
DJ Khaled; Heidi Klum	Favorite Music Group

== Slimed celebrities ==
- Demi Lovato
- Chris Pratt
- Kevin Hart
- John Cena

== Winners and nominees ==
- The nominees were announced on February 2, 2017.
- 28 categories were announced that were available worldwide with an additional 40 for regional categories
- Winners are listed first, in **bold**. Other nominees are in alphabetical order.

=== Movies ===
Favorite Movie	Favorite Movie Actor
**Ghostbusters**; Batman v Superman: Dawn of Justice; Captain America: Civil War; Pete's Dragon; Rogue One: A Star Wars Story; Teenage Mutant Ninja Turtles: Out of the Shadows	**Chris Hemsworth** – Ghostbusters as Kevin Beckman; Ben Affleck – Batman v Superman: Dawn of Justice as Bruce Wayne / Batman; Will Arnett – Teenage Mutant Ninja Turtles: Out of the Shadows as Vern Fenwick; Henry Cavill – Batman v Superman: Dawn of Justice as Kal-El / Clark Kent / Superman; Robert Downey Jr. – Captain America: Civil War as Tony Stark / Iron Man; Chris Evans – Captain America: Civil War as Steve Rogers / Captain America
Favorite Movie Actress	Favorite Animated Movie
**Melissa McCarthy** – Ghostbusters as Dr. Abigail "Abby" Yates; Amy Adams – Batman v Superman: Dawn of Justice as Lois Lane; Megan Fox – Teenage Mutant Ninja Turtles: Out of the Shadows as April O'Neil; Scarlett Johansson – Captain America: Civil War as Natasha Romanoff / Black Widow; Felicity Jones – Rogue One: A Star Wars Story as Jyn Erso; Kristen Wiig – Ghostbusters as Dr. Erin Gilbert	**Finding Dory**; Moana; The Secret Life of Pets; Sing; Trolls; Zootopia
Favorite Voice From an Animated Movie	Favorite Villain
**Ellen DeGeneres** – Finding Dory as Dory; Kevin Hart – The Secret Life of Pets as Snowball; Dwayne Johnson – Moana as Maui; Anna Kendrick – Trolls as Princess Poppy; Justin Timberlake – Trolls as Branch; Reese Witherspoon – Sing as Rosita	**Kevin Hart** – The Secret Life of Pets as Snowball; Helena Bonham Carter – Alice Through the Looking Glass as Iracebeth of Crims / Red Queen; Idris Elba – Star Trek Beyond as Krall; Will Ferrell – Zoolander 2 as Jacobim Mugatu; Charlize Theron – The Huntsman: Winter's War as Queen Ravenna; Spencer Wilding – Rogue One: A Star Wars Story as Darth Vader
Favorite Butt-Kicker	BFFs (Best Friends Forever)
**Chris Evans** – Captain America: Civil War as Steve Rogers / Captain America; Ben Affleck – Batman v Superman: Dawn of Justice as Bruce Wayne / Batman; Henry Cavill – Batman v Superman: Dawn of Justice as Kal-El / Clark Kent / Superman; Chris Hemsworth – The Huntsman: Winter's War as Eric / The Huntsman; Scarlett Johansson – Captain America: Civil War as Natasha Romanoff / Black Widow; Felicity Jones – Rogue One: A Star Wars Story as Jyn Erso; Jennifer Lawrence – X-Men: Apocalypse as Raven Darkhölme / Mystique; Zoe Saldaña – Star Trek Beyond as Lieutenant Uhura	**Kevin Hart and Dwayne Johnson** – Central Intelligence as Calvin "Golden Jet" Joyner and Robbie Wheirdicht / Bob Stone; Ruby Barnhill and Mark Rylance – The BFG as Sophie and The BFG; Ice Cube and Kevin Hart – Ride Along 2 as Detective James Payton and Officer Ben Barber; Chris Pine and Zachary Quinto – Star Trek Beyond as Captain James T. Kirk and Commander Spock; Neel Sethi and Bill Murray – The Jungle Book as Mowgli and Baloo; Ben Stiller and Owen Wilson – Zoolander 2 as Derek Zoolander and Hansel McDonald
Favorite Frenemies	Most Wanted Pet
**Ginnifer Goodwin and Jason Bateman** – Zootopia as Officer Judy Hopps and Nicholas P. "Nick" Wilde; Ben Affleck and Henry Cavill – Batman v Superman: Dawn of Justice as Bruce Wayne / Batman and Kal-El / Clark Kent / Superman; Chris Evans and Robert Downey Jr. – Captain America: Civil War as Steve Rogers / Captain America and Tony Stark / Iron Man; Dwayne Johnson and Auliʻi Cravalho – Moana as Maui and Moana; Anna Kendrick and Justin Timberlake – Trolls as Princess Poppy and Branch; Charlize Theron and Emily Blunt – The Huntsman: Winter's War as Queen Ravenna and Freya	**Kevin Hart** – The Secret Life of Pets as Snowball; Jack Black – Kung Fu Panda 3 as Po; Ellen DeGeneres – Finding Dory as Dory; Bill Murray – The Jungle Book as Baloo; Jason Sudeikis – The Angry Birds Movie as Red; Reese Witherspoon – Sing as Rosita
#Squad
**Finding Dory** – Ellen DeGeneres, Albert Brooks, Hayden Rolence, Ed O'Neill, Kaitlin Olson, Ty Burrell, Diane Keaton and Eugene Levy; Captain America: Civil War – Chris Evans, Robert Downey Jr., Scarlett Johansson, Sebastian Stan, Anthony Mackie, Don Cheadle, Jeremy Renner, Chadwick Boseman, Paul Bettany and Elizabeth Olsen; Ghostbusters – Melissa McCarthy, Kristen Wiig, Kate McKinnon and Leslie Jones; Rogue One: A Star Wars Story – Felicity Jones, Diego Luna, Riz Ahmed, Donnie Yen, Mads Mikkelsen, Alan Tudyk, Jiang Wen and Forest Whitaker; Teenage Mutant Ninja Turtles: Out of the Shadows – Noel Fisher, Jeremy Howard, Pete Ploszek and Alan Ritchson; X-Men: Apocalypse – James McAvoy, Michael Fassbender, Jennifer Lawrence, Nicholas Hoult, Evan Peters, Tye Sheridan, Ben Hardy, Kodi Smit-McPhee, Sophie Turner, Alexandra Shipp and Olivia Munn

=== Television ===
Favorite TV Show – Kids Show	Favorite TV Show – Family Show
**Henry Danger**; Game Shakers; Girl Meets World; Nicky, Ricky, Dicky & Dawn; The Thundermans	**Fuller House**; Agents of S.H.I.E.L.D.; The Big Bang Theory; Black-ish; The Flash; Supergirl
Favorite TV Actor	Favorite TV Actress
**Jace Norman** – Henry Danger as Henry Hart; Benjamin Flores Jr. – Game Shakers as Triple G; Aidan Gallagher – Nicky, Ricky, Dicky & Dawn as Nicky Harper; Jack Griffo – The Thundermans as Max Thunderman; Casey Simpson – Nicky, Ricky, Dicky & Dawn as Ricky Harper; Tyrel Jackson Williams – Lab Rats as Leo Dooley	**Zendaya** – K.C. Undercover as K.C. Cooper; Rowan Blanchard – Girl Meets World as Riley Matthews; Dove Cameron – Liv and Maddie as Liv and Maddie Rooney; Lizzy Greene – Nicky, Ricky, Dicky & Dawn as Dawn Harper; Kira Kosarin – The Thundermans as Phoebe Thunderman; Breanna Yde – School of Rock as Tomika
Favorite Reality Show	Favorite Cartoon
**America's Got Talent**; America's Funniest Home Videos; American Ninja Warrior; Paradise Run; Shark Tank; The Voice	**SpongeBob SquarePants**; ALVINNN!!! and the Chipmunks; The Amazing World of Gumball; The Loud House; Teen Titans Go!; Teenage Mutant Ninja Turtles

=== Music ===
Favorite Music Group	Favorite Male Singer
**Fifth Harmony**; The Chainsmokers; Maroon 5; OneRepublic; Pentatonix; Twenty One Pilots	**Shawn Mendes**; Justin Bieber; Drake; Bruno Mars; Justin Timberlake; The Weeknd
Favorite Female Singer	Favorite Song
**Selena Gomez**; Adele; Beyoncé; Ariana Grande; Rihanna; Meghan Trainor	**"Work from Home"** – Fifth Harmony ft. Ty Dolla $ign; "24K Magic" – Bruno Mars; "Can't Stop the Feeling!" – Justin Timberlake; "Heathens" – Twenty One Pilots; "Send My Love (To Your New Lover)" – Adele; "Side to Side" – Ariana Grande ft. Nicki Minaj
Favorite New Artist	Favorite Music Video
**Twenty One Pilots**; Kelsea Ballerini; The Chainsmokers; Daya; Lukas Graham; Solange; Rae Sremmurd; Hailee Steinfeld	**"Juju on That Beat"** – Zay Hilfigerrr and Zayion McCall; "24K Magic" – Bruno Mars; "Can't Stop the Feeling!" – Justin Timberlake; "Formation" – Beyoncé; "Me Too" – Meghan Trainor; "Stressed Out" – Twenty One Pilots
Favorite DJ/EDM Artist	Favorite Soundtrack
**Calvin Harris**; Martin Garrix; DJ Snake; Major Lazer; Skrillex; Zedd	**Suicide Squad**; Hamilton; Me Before You; Moana; Sing; Trolls
Favorite Viral Music Artist	Favorite Global Music Star
**JoJo Siwa**; Tiffany Alvord; Matty B; Carson Lueders; Johnny Orlando; Jacob Sartorius	**Little Mix**; 5 Seconds of Summer; BigBang; Zara Larsson; Bruno Mars; Shakira

=== Miscellaneous ===
Favorite Video Game
- **Just Dance 2017**
  - Lego Marvel's Avengers
  - Lego Star Wars: The Force Awakens
  - Minecraft: Story Mode
  - Paper Mario: Color Splash
  - Pokémon Sun and Moon

== International ==
Source: Various Nick Sites

Favorite Pinoy Star (Philippines)	Favorite African Star (Africa)
Nadine Lustre; Janella Salvador; Janine Gutierrez; Liza Soberano	Trevor Noah; Funke Akindele-Bello; Lupita Nyong'o; Pearl Thusi; Wayde van Niekerk; Yemi Alade
Favorite Latin Star (Latin America)	Favorite Squad (Australia)
CD9; Juan Pablo Jaramillo; Juanpa Zurita; Lali Espósito; Paty Cantú; Sebastian Villalobos	5 Seconds of Summer; All Blacks; In Stereo; Socceroos; Women's Rugby 7's
Favorite #Famous (Australia)	Favorite Human Eva (Australia)
Ashleigh Ross; Isaiah Firebrace; Jai Waetford; The Norris Nuts; Troye Sivan	Delta Goodrem; Guy Sebastian; Shaun Johnson; Steve Smith; Tim Cahill
Favorite Pranksters (Australia)	Favorite Must-Have (Australia)
Rebel Wilson; Andy Griffiths and Terry Denton; Grant Denyer; Guy Williams; Hamish and Andy	Nintendo 3DS; Apple iPad; FujiFilm Instax; Nerf Blaster; PlayStation 4
Favorite Star (Belgium)	Favorite TV Series (Belgium and Netherlands)
K3; Emma Bale; Koen Wauters; Laura Tesoro; Marie Verhulst; Olga Leyers	Brugklas; The Ludwigs; D5R; Ghost Rockers; Nightwatch; SpangaS
Favorite Vlogger (Belgium and Netherlands)	Favorite Brazilian Personality (Brazil)
Onnedi; Furtjuh; Meisjedjamila; Nora Gharib; Quinsding; UP2D8	Luba TV; Anitta; Christian Figueiredo; Kéfera Buchmann; Larissa Manoela; Rezendeevil; Thaynara OG; Zé Felipe
Favorite Music Star (Denmark)	Favorite Vlogger (Denmark)
Benjamin Lasnier; Christopher; Cisilia; Gulddreng	Julia Sofia; Armin; Eiqu Miller; Rasmus Brohave
Favorite Star (Germany, Austria, and Switzerland)	Favorite Vlogger (Germany, Austria, and Switzerland)
Lucas Rieger; Lina Larissa Ray and Lisa-Marie Koroll (Bibi & Tina); Wincent Weiss; Lena Gercke	The Lochis; Dominokati; Julien Bam; Dagi Bee
Favorite Artist (Spain)	Favorite Influence (Spain)
Abraham Mateo; Furious Monkey House; María Parrado; Sweet California	Luzu; Laury What; Maria Querol; TrillizoS0201
Best Web Revelation (France)	Favorite Singer (Italy)
Mademoiselle Gloria; Anthonin; Sourbangirl; Sulivan Gwed	Benji & Fede; Alessio Bernabei; Elodie; Gemeliers; Luca Chikovani
Favorite YouTuber (Italy)	Favorite Arab Music Artist (Middle East)
Mates; Ehi Leus; Favij; Ipantellas; Matt & Bise; Virginia De Giglio	Aseel Omran; Joseph Attieh; Lara Scandar; Rajaa & Omar Belmir
Favorite Star (Netherlands)	Favorite Artist (Norway)
Ali B; Britt Scholte; Broederliefde; Buddy Vedder; Rein Van Duivenboden; Vajen Van Den Bosch	Astrid S; Julie Bergen; Katastrofe; Marcus & Martinus
Favorite Music Act (Russia)	Favorite Mobile Application (Russia)
Open Kids; Elena Temnikova; Monatik; L'One; Mot; ST	Note: names are translated to English: Cut The Rope: Magic; MSQRD; Prisma; Fighting Minds; Teenage Mutant Ninja Turtles: Legend
Favorite Cartoon (Russia)	Favorite TV Show (Russia)
Note: names are translated to English: Masha and the Bear; Dzhingliki; Pin; Fixiki; The Loud House	Note: names are translated to English: Boom! Show; Dancing With The Stars; Eagle & Tails; Masterchef Kids; Prank Wars; The Voice Kids
Favorite Web Star (Russia)	Favorite Star (Poland)
Note: names are translated to English: Agata Mutsenietse; Annie Mae; Dima Yermuzevich; Mari Senn	Andrzej Wrona; Dawid Kwiatkowski; Littlemoonster96; Maffashion; Margaret
Favorite YouTuber (Portugal)	Favorite Star (Sweden)
SofiaBBeauty; Paulo Sousa; SirKazzio; Tubalatudo	Dolly Style; Marcus & Martinus; FO&O; Zara Larsson
Favorite Vlogger (Sweden)	KCA Social Squad (International)
Manfred Erlandsson; Misslisibel; Therese Lindgren; Vlad Reiser	Voting via Social Media Site (for Sliming): Benjamin Lasnier; Saffron Barker; Mario Bautista; Dagi Bee; Alex Mapeli; Jess Conte; Gabriel Conte
