= Xororó =

Brazilian sertanejo singer (born 1957)

Xororó OMC
- Xororó in 2024

Background information
- Born: Durval de Lima; 30 September 1957 (age 69); Astorga, Paraná, Brazil
- Years active: 1969-present
- Member of: Chitãozinho & Xororó
- Spouse: Noely Pereira Lima (m.1981)

Xororó, stage name of Durval de Lima OMC (Astorga, 30 September 1957), is a Brazilian singer, songwriter, musician, and record producer. He is one half of the sertanejo music duo Chitãozinho & Xororó, alongside his older brother, Chitãozinho.

== Early life ==
Xororó was born in Astorga, in the state of Paraná, on 30 September 1957, to Araci Prudêncio de Lima and Mário de Lima, known as Marinho. He is three years younger than his brother Chitãozinho, who provides the duo's second vocal part. They grew up in a family of eight children: Maurício, Amauri, Nilva, Rosália, José, Tião and Ricardo. Chitãozinho & Xororó are regarded as pioneers in bringing sertanejo music to FM radio, as well as for incorporating elements of American country music into traditional sertanejo. Xororó is also the brother of fellow sertanejo duo Maurício & Mauri and Tiãozinho, who performs as a duo with Alessandro, the brother of sertanejo duo Leandro & Leonardo.

== Career ==
The duo began their musical career at a young age. They adopted their stage names from the song "Chitãozinho & Xororó", which they subsequently recorded. The song refers to two species of birds, the inambu-xintã and the inambu-chororó, whose melancholic calls inspired the names.

The duo released their first album in 1970. Among its most successful tracks was the song "Galopeira", alongside other songs with strong sentimental appeal. The album was released by the Copacabana record label, and the duo maintained a prolific recording schedule until 1977. Their record sales gradually increased, and in 1979 they released their first major hit, "60 Dias Apaixonado", which earned them a gold record. The song was subsequently recorded by other sertanejo singers.

Xororó and his brother Chitãozinho have recorded more than 40 albums and sold over 37 million copies. Their success, alongside the numerous Brazilian music awards they have received, has also been closely associated with their appearances on Brazilian television programmes. Xororó is generally reserved about his personal life and has stated that his career would have no meaning without Chitãozinho.

== Personal life ==
Xororó has been married to Noely Pereira Lima since 1981. The couple live in a gated community in the Campinas region of the interior of São Paulo state, and have two children, singers Sandy and Junior Lima.

His father, Mário Lima, was a singer before his marriage, while his mother, Araci Prudêncio, also sang. Xororó is the former father-in-law of multi-instrumentalist Lucas Lima. He is also the brother of singers Maurício Lima and Mauri Lima, who form the sertanejo duo Maurício & Mauri, as well as Sebastião Aparecido Lima, known as Tiãozinho.

== Discography ==
According to the duo's official website, they have sold more than 35 million records.

- Moreninha Linda (1969)
- Chitãozinho & Xororó (1970)
- A Mais Jovem Dupla do Brasil (1972)
- Caminhos de Minha Infância (1974)
- A Força Jovem da Música Sertaneja (1976)
- A Força Jovem da Música Sertaneja - Vol. II (1977)
- 60 Dias Apaixonado (1979)
- Amante Amada (1981)
- Somos Apaixonados (1982)
- Amante (1984)
- Fotografia (1985)
- Coração Quebrado (1986)
- Meu Disfarce (1987)
- Nossas Canções Preferidas (1989)
- Os Meninos do Brasil (1989)
- Cowboy do Asfalto (1990)
- Planeta Azul (1991)
- Tudo por Amor (1993)
- Coração do Brasil (1994)
- Chitãozinho & Xororó (1995)
- Clássicos Sertanejos (1996)
- Em Família (1997)
- Na Aba do Meu Chapéu (1998)
- Alô (1999)
- Inseparáveis (2001)
- Festa do Interior (2002)
- Minha Vida, Minha Música (2002)
- Aqui o Sistema é Bruto (2004)
- Vida Marvada (2006)
- Se For pra Ser Feliz (2009)
- Tom do Sertão (2015)
- Tempo de Romance (2020)

== Filmography ==
| Year | Title | Role |
|---|---|---|
| 2014 | Festival Sertanejo | Presenter |
| 2018 | Coração de Cowboy | Himself |
