= Leonardo (singer) =

Brazilian singer

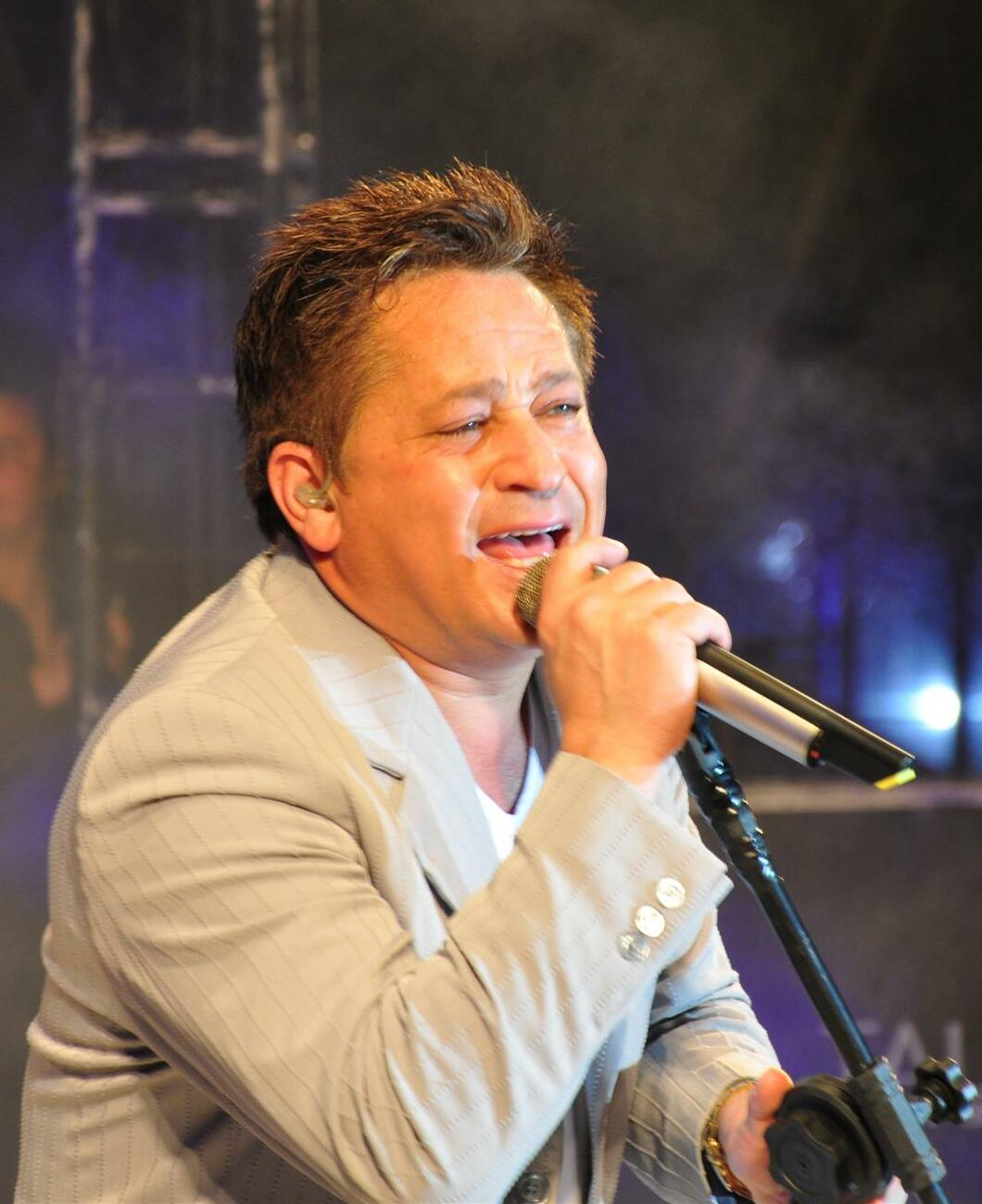
- Leonardo at Expo FISAV in Votuporanga, 2010
- Born: Emival Eterno da Costa; July 25, 1963 (age 62); Goianápolis, Goiás, Brazil
- Occupation: Singer
- Years active: 1983–present
- Spouse(s): Maria Dantas (married 1985–1988); Poliana Rocha (married 1995 - present)
- Musical career
- Genres: sertanejo; country
- Instruments: Vocals; guitar
- Labels: BMG; Talismã; Universal; Sony
- Formerly of: Leandro e Leonardo
- Website: www.leonardo.art.br

Emival Eterno da Costa (Goianápolis, July 25, 1963), better known by his stage name Leonardo, is a Brazilian singer and businessman. His musical career began in 1983, when he and his brother Luís José Costa, known as Leandro, decided to attempt an artistic career and formed the sertanejo duo Leandro & Leonardo. In June 1998, Leandro died due to a rare lung cancer and Leonardo set out to pursue a solo career.

He has already sold more than 35 million records.

== Biography ==
Leonardo was born in Goianápolis, a city located in the Região Metropolitana de Goiânia, in the state of Goiás, on July 25, 1963, the fourth of eight siblings. He was the son of Avelino Virgulino da Costa, who died on January 11, 2015 at the age of 78, and Carmem Divina Eterno da Silva, who died on April 1, 2023 at the age of 87. Leonardo's inseparable companion was his brother Leandro (Luis José), a year and eleven months older, born on August 15, 1961. Due to numerous difficulties, the family moved to Carmo do Rio Verde, also in Goiás, to try and find a new opportunity. Unfortunately, things did not turn out as expected and so the family returned to Goianápolis, where Avelino started working as a sharecropper in the tomato fields. From an early age, Leandro was the shyest, but he dreamed of a better life for his family. In the tomato fields, he was agile and in the farm, the obligatory repertoire was the songs of Chitãozinho & Xororó. Avelino, like Leandro, was always accompanied by his guitar, awakening in his children an interest in music. Leonardo, on the other hand, always very electric and lively, despite his many jokes, had a serious side and would find a way of earning more by doing extra work, and dreamed of a better life for his whole family.

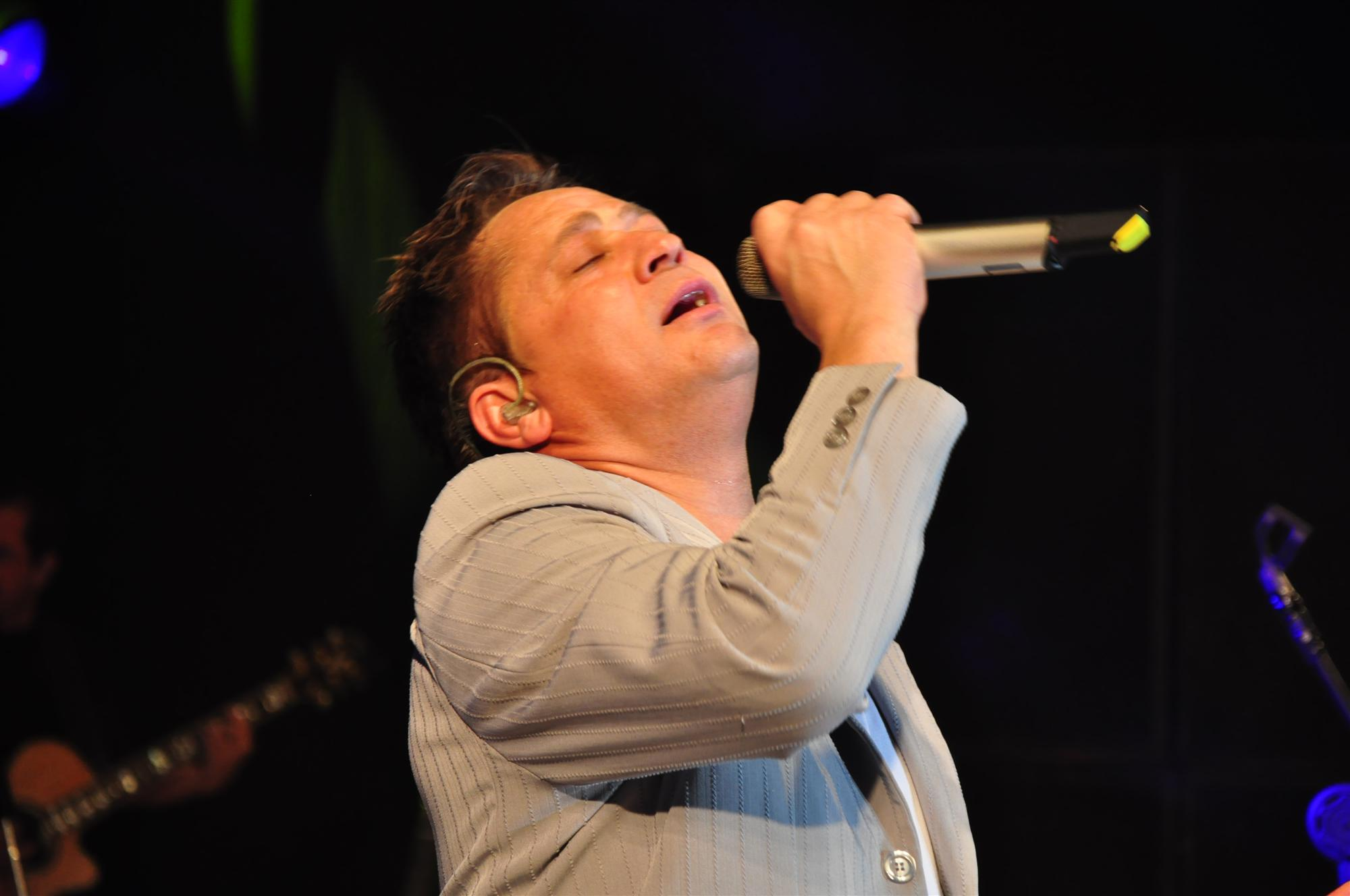
Leonardo at Expo FISAV in Votuporanga (2010)

Once again, due to the difficulties they experienced, the family was forced to leave their hometown and go to Goiânia. The harsh experience made them all decide to return to Goianápolis. At this time, with the encouragement of his friends, Leandro devoted his free time to music and joined the band Os Dominantes, which played hits by Roberto Carlos and the Beatles. Meanwhile, Leonardo sang only at work, but gradually the two brothers began to rehearse as a duo and decided, with the support of the whole family, to return to Goiânia to try their hand at music. Arriving in the capital, the two boys soon found jobs to support themselves. Leonardo worked in a pharmacy and Leandro in the central market. Every spare minute was dedicated to rehearsals. Uncle Zé, Carmem's brother, traveled with them and made sure the duo got gigs, as did Anselmo, Leonardo's boss. It was at this time that the duo's name was chosen. When they heard that one of the pharmacy employees had twin sons named Leandro and Leonardo, they had no doubts. The performances did not bring in much money, but even so they were not discouraged and so the first contract came up, and the duo signed for four minimum wages to sing in a better location. From then on, they began to receive offers to perform in neighboring towns and invitations to appear on television. The first program to invite the duo to take part was 'Beira da Mata', aired on TV Tocantins, from Anápolis, Goiás. The performance was not a success due to their nervousness, but they were invited back many times afterwards, as they became better known, especially in the interior of the regions of Goiás and MatoGrosso. Their first album, recorded with their own resources and the help of friends, came out in 1984 and featured the song 'Hoje Accordei Chorando'. The record was sold in the bars where they sang. In search of professional fulfillment, Leandro & Leonardo constantly traveled to São Paulo, with the financial help of a jeweler from Goiânia, to try to get a contract with a record company. At that time, the song 'Contradições' (by Martinha and César Augusto), recorded on the album Leandro & Leonardo, by 1986, was starting to become known. But the duo's success came with the hit 'Entre Tapas e Beijos', recorded on their third album. On their fourth album, Leandro & Leonardo, released in 1990, the song 'Pense em Mim' (Think of Me) broke all the radio records, giving the duo even greater repercussions as they conquered all Brazilians. The album's release included a performance at the Canecão, a Rio de Janeiro concert hall, which was opening its doors to the boys from Goianápolis for the first time. With such success, the duo soon conquered the big screen. TV Globo, a Brazilian television channel, hired them to host the program Leandro & Leonardo Especial. Increasingly admired, known and loved by the public, they became one of the best-selling duos in the history of Brazilian music. Fifteen years into their career, they had already sold 25 million records. In 1995, the duo teamed up with Chitãozinho & Xororó and Zezé di Camargo & Luciano to present one of Rede Globo's most successful programs, Amigos, which appeared on the schedule as a New Year's Eve special and was later broadcast weekly on the network due to its large audience. The results of the show were so positive that the meeting of the three duos led to the production of four Amigos CDs, which sold millions of copies throughout Brazil. At the height of his success and close to releasing the album Um Sonhador (A Dreamer), Leandro began to feel ill and, after much struggle, he could not overcome lung cancer and died on June 23, 1998. After being honored by thousands of fans in São Paulo, he was buried in Goiânia, where he also received the affection of relatives and friends. Leonardo, after receiving support from his family, friends and fans of the duo, released his first solo album Tempo in 1999, almost a year after his brother's death. Today, after having released 11 CDs and 4 DVDs, Leonardo has sold more than 15 million copies and has fulfilled his dream of continuing the career of the duo Leandro & Leonardo.

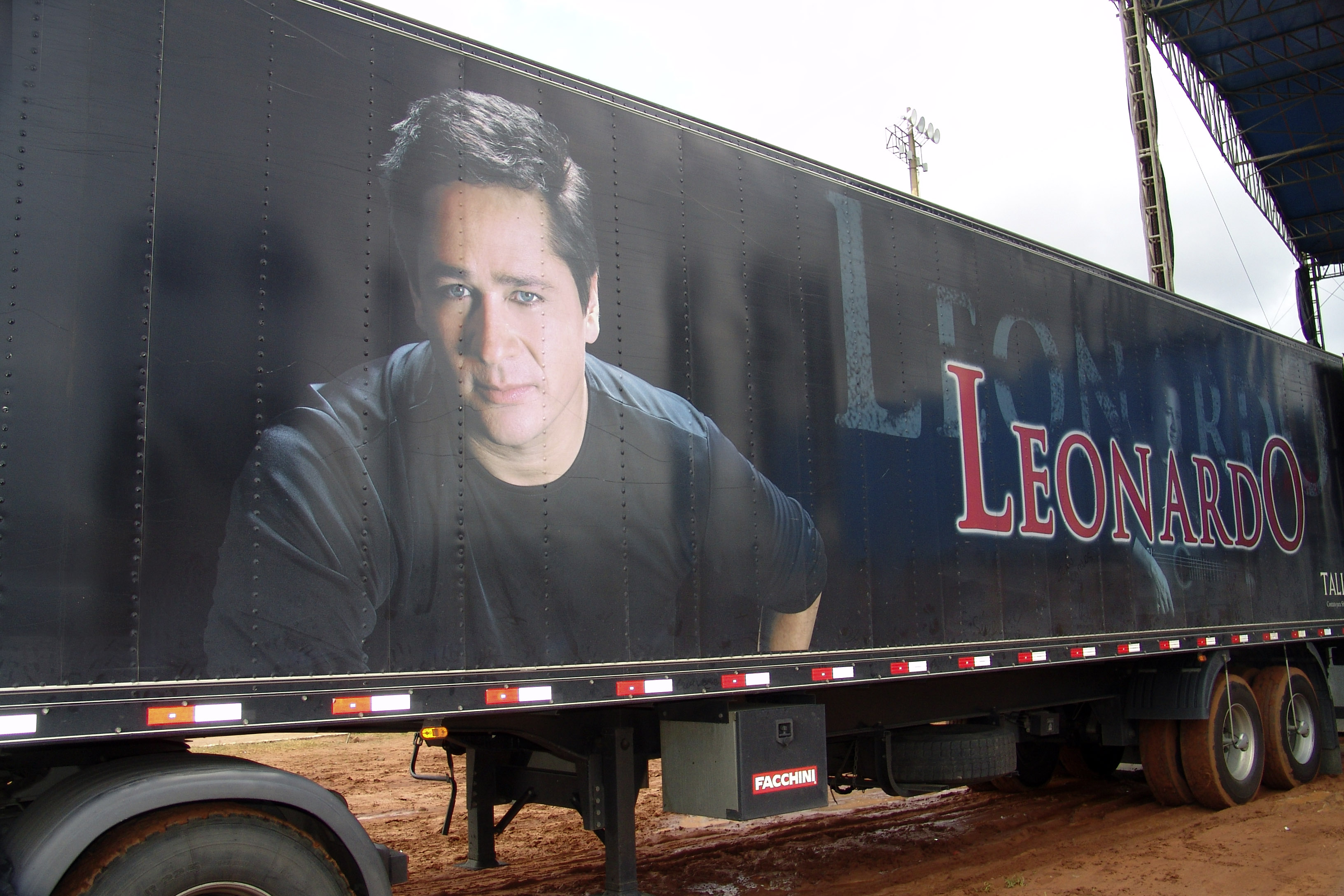
Truck that transports the singer's equipment, located in the municipality of Avaré (São Paulo).

After his son, Pedro Leonardo's, accident in April 2012, he announced that would gradually end his career.

Pretendo parar de cantar aos poucos. Parar de uma vez eu não aguento, e sei que me faria uma falta lascada. Vou diminuir o número de shows. - (I plan to stop singing very gradually. I can't stand to stop at once, and I know I'd miss it terribly. I'm gonna reduce the number of concerts.)

In 2013, he published his autobiography 'Não Aprendi Dizer Adeus', by the publisher Casa da Palavra.

Later that year, he left Universal Music after seven years and returned to Sony Music.

In 2014, he launched a project with the singer Eduardo Costa, entitled 'Cabaré' (nightclub), in which they recalled great hits from the roots of sertanejo music.

== Personal life ==
=== Relationships ===
Between 1985 and 1988 he was married to the teacher Maria Aparecida Dantas, with whom he had a son, the singer Pedro Leonardo, born on June 29, 1987. Over the next few years he had two more daughters from short/brief relationships:the agronomist Monyque Isabella, born on October 10, 1991, conceived in a relationship between the singer and the businesswoman Sandra Helena; and the digital influencer Jéssica Beatriz, born on March 17, 1994, conceived in a relationship between the singer and the jewelry designer Priscila Beatriz.

In 1994, he began dating the journalist Poliana Rocha, whom he married on July 25, 1995, and had a son, the singer Zé Felipe, born on April 21, 1998. During the time he was married, Leonardo had an extramarital relationship with the singer Liz Vargas, lead singer of Banana Split, with whom he had a son, Matheus Vargas, born on May 10, 1998, just 19 days after Zé Felipe.

Due to his affair, his marriage to Poliana came to an end at that time. Between 2001 and 2002 Leonardo dated the dancer Naira Ávila and had his sixth child, the actor João Guilherme, born on February 1, 2002. At the end of 2002 he remarried Poliana.

Leonardo has six grandchildren: Maria Sophia (2011) and Maria Vitória (2018), daughters of Pedro Leonardo; Noah (2016), son of Jéssica Beatriz with Sandro Pedroso; Maria Alice (2021), Maria Flor (2022) and José Leonardo (2024), children of Zé Felipe with Virginia Fonseca.

=== Accident ===
On November 17, 2003, Leonardo overturned a Land Rover jeep, causing an accident that killed his friend Sebastião Figueiredo Arantes, then 47, and left four injured on the highway GO-070. Leonardo denied that he had been speeding and claimed that he had car problems. However, the director of the Coima dealership, part of the Land Rover network, Dirceu Bernardon, said that the car had been lent: "There's no such thing as a test drive. He asked me for the car to go on a trip and I lent it to him." As for the possibility of mechanical problems with the car, Dirceu also says that "the car was checked over before the loan. Tank full, water and oil checked and exactly 1,853 kilometers driven. There's no such thing as a broken axle or anything like that."

== Discografia ==
- 1999: Tempo
- 1999: Ao Vivo
- 2000: Quero Colo
- 2001: Todas as Coisas do Mundo
- 2002: Todas as Coisas do Mundo Ao Vivo
- 2002: Te Amo Demais
- 2003: Brincadeira Tem Hora
- 2004: Leonardo Canta Grandes Sucessos
- 2005: Leonardo Canta Grandes Sucessos Vol. 2
- 2006: De Corpo e Alma
- 2008: Coração Bandido
- 2009: Esse Alguém Sou Eu
- 2010: Alucinação
- 2011: Nada Mudou
- 2013: Vivo Apaixonado
- 2014: 30 Anos
- 2014: Cabaré (feat. Eduardo Costa)
- 2016: Bar do Leo
- 2016: Cabaré Night Club (feat. Eduardo Costa)
- 2018: Canto, Bebo e Choro - Ao Vivo
- 2019: A História Continua - Ao Vivo em São Paulo (feat. Chitãozinho & Xororó and Zezé Di Camargo & Luciano)
- 2022: Homem Safado (EP)
