= SpaceHey =

Retro social network

- Website type: Social networking service
- Available in: English
- Founded: November 26, 2020; 5 years ago
- Headquarters: Pfullingen, Germany
- Area served: Worldwide
- Founder: Anton Röhm
- Parent: tibush GmbH
- Website: spacehey.com
- Registration: Required, invite only (to interact with other users)
- Users: 2,000,000+ (March 2026)
- Launched: November 26, 2020; 5 years ago
- Current status: Active
- Written in: PHP

SpaceHey is an English-language online social network operated by the German company tibush GmbH and headquartered in Pfullingen. Founded in 2020 by Anton Röhm, the project serves as a homage to social media platform MySpace during its peak in the mid-2000s. However, it is not officially affiliated with MySpace.

== History ==
SpaceHey was created in 2020 by 18-year-old German web developer Anton Röhm. Röhm stated that he never personally used MySpace at its peak, due to the fact that he was too young at the time, but added, "Thanks to older friends and the internet, I heard a lot about it. I came to the conclusion that you can't find something like this nowadays, where everyone can be this creative".

On November 26, 2020, SpaceHey launched under the domain spacehey.com. Three days later Röhm posted it on Product Hunt where it was awarded #1 Product of the Day on the same day. Röhm stated that the site had over 10,000 registered users by December 2020 and 100,000 users by February 2021. To cope with growing user demand, the site migrated its infrastructure in October 2021. In November 2021, registered users had grown to over 300,000. The website had about 500,000 users by April 2022.

Beginning in July 2025, the website has become inaccessible to people in the United Kingdom due to the Online Safety Act. Beginning in March 2026, the website has become inaccesible to people in Brazil due to the ECA Digital age verification laws.

On March 15, 2026, SpaceHey went invite-only in an attempt to combat against spam; registration for all newer users now requires entering an invite code from an existing user.

== Features ==
SpaceHey can be viewed without registration. However, in order to publish content or interact with other users, a user account must be created. New users not only need to enter an email address and password, but also enter a valid invite code from an existing user.

SpaceHey has many of the same basic functions that Myspace had at its peak, such as profile pages, blogs, bulletins, interest groups, and instant messaging. In a blog post, Anton Röhm stated that it is currently not possible to implement the gallery function that many users want because it would take up too much storage space and the available financial resources could not provide the necessary space as of June 2021.

An aspect of SpaceHey that differs it from modern social media is the ability of users to fully customize the appearance and functionality of their profile pages using HTML and CSS, which was one of MySpace's most notable features. However, this also results in security problems as it did with MySpace; users can use HTML to integrate external content into their profiles that could potentially be harmful to the profile visitor.

Unlike Myspace, SpaceHey allows users to share posts on other social media platforms. It is also possible to embed content from YouTube, Spotify, SoundCloud, Bandcamp, and Mixcloud.

Röhm has called SpaceHey "privacy-friendly", unlike most other social media platforms. Posts on the user's feed are displayed chronologically.

SpaceHey also has verified users on the platform. Verified users are identified by a verification check icon by their names on their accounts. Unlike other social media platforms, clicking the verified icon identifies the reason the user is verified. For example, user Marie Rousseau's reason for being verified is "Writer/Motivational Speaker" and user Ramaj Eroc's reason is "Official Artist Account".

Similar to MySpace at its peak, SpaceHey aims to launch a music aspect of the website, where independent Artists/Bands can create their own page to share previews of music and interact with fans. This feature is currently in beta.

== Financing ==
SpaceHey is free to use. The platform lacked advertising as of April 2022. In a blog-post from December 2020, Röhm called for ideas for funding to be sent to him. Later that month, it was made possible to support the site by purchasing stickers; after purchase, a "supporter badge" will appear on the website next to the buyer's name. As of November 2023, Christmas sweaters are able to be purchased as well.

== Media attention ==
SpaceHey has been discussed by media such as The Independent, Vice, BuzzFeed, and the New York Post. In December 2020, Fast Company published an interview with Anton Röhm. In March 2021, BBC Radio Oxford interviewed him via telephone.

== Reception ==
The platform has been well received as it exerts little social pressure on users. Upworthy writer Todd Perry wrote: "The site doesn't have any algorithms, news-feed, or like-buttons. So that means you get to see everything as it happens in real-time and there's no need to worry about how many likes your bulletin received. The site is also highly concerned with privacy and careful about the information it shares with third-parties."

In its first years of operation, SpaceHey has received criticism for its overly simplistic spam protection; in one example, Canadian journalist Clive Thompson wanted to indicate in his profile that he was interested in the work of the American poet Emily Dickinson, but as an instance of the so-called Scunthorpe problem, his entry was blocked by the system because it included the word "dick". Thompson, however, took this "incident" with humor.
