= Nikolas Ferreira =

Brazilian politician (born 1996)

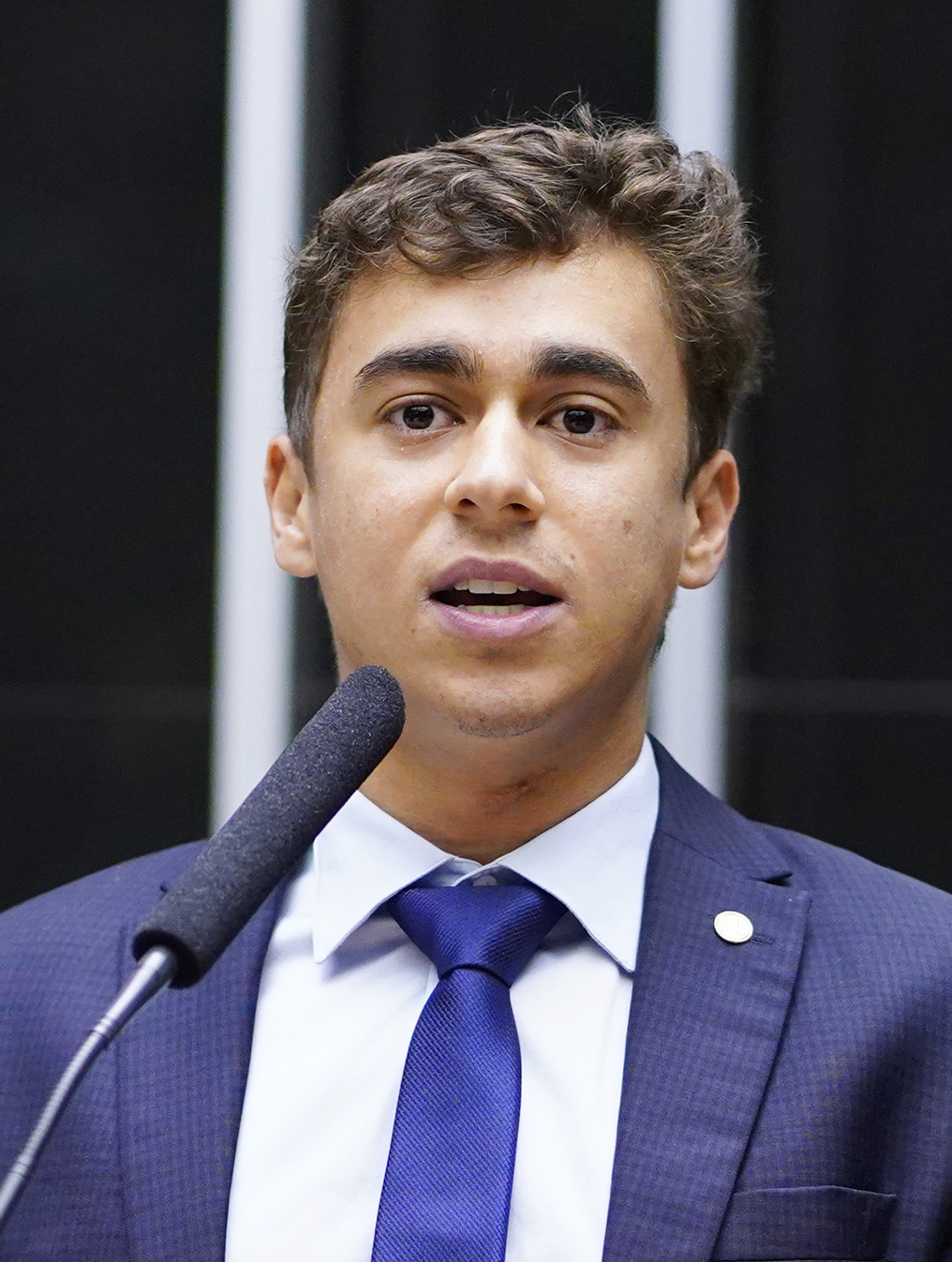
- Ferreira in 2023

Member of the Chamber of Deputies
- Incumbent
- Assumed office 1 February 2023
- Constituency: Minas Gerais

Councillor of Belo Horizonte
- In office 1 January 2021 – 1 February 2023
- Succeeded by: Uner Augusto
- Constituency: At-large

Personal details
- Born: Nikolas Ferreira de Oliveira; 30 May 1996 (age 30) Belo Horizonte, Minas Gerais, Brazil
- Party: PL (2022–present)
- Other political affiliations: PSL (2018–2020); PRTB (2020–2022)
- Spouse: Lívia Orletti (m. 2023)
- Children: 2
- Education: Pontifical Catholic University of Minas Gerais (LL.B.)

Nikolas Ferreira de Oliveira (born 1996) is a Brazilian right-wing politician affiliated to the Liberal Party (PL). Currently serving as Member of the Chamber of Deputies, he was elected for a 4-year term in 2022, being the most voted Member of the Chamber of Deputies in the 2022 Brazilian general election, with almost 1.5 million votes, and the most voted in Minas Gerais history for that office. Formerly, he was elected Councillor of Belo Horizonte, in 2020, the second most voted candidate after Duda Salabert.

He describes himself as a "right-wing Christian, gun enthusiast, and family defender", and is considered one of the most influential politicians on social media in Brazil. Ferreira has gained national notoriety due to the controversies he has been involved in, including defending negationist ideas, spreading fake news, and supporting and encouraging violent demonstrations as well as the demonstrations on the headquarters of the Three Powers in 2023.

== Personal life ==
Nikolas was born on 30 May 1996 in the favela of Cabana Pai Tomaz, in the western region of Belo Horizonte, the son of Maria Ruth Ferreira de Oliveira and evangelical pastor Edésio de Oliveira. In January 2023, he announced his engagement to Espírito Santo model Lívia Bergamim Orletti, and invited former President Jair Bolsonaro to the wedding ceremony. They married in April 2023, in Espírito Santo.

He holds a bachelor's degree in Law, graduated from the Pontifical Catholic University of Minas Gerais (PUC-MG). He is an evangelical Christian from the Grace and Peace Community denomination, stating that he suffered at the university when trying to assert himself as a conservative Christian.

In March 4 2024, Nikolas and Lívia Orletti had your first daughter, Aurora. The couple announced their pregnancy in July 2023. The couple's second daughter, Serena, was born on September 30, 2025.

== Statements and conviction ==
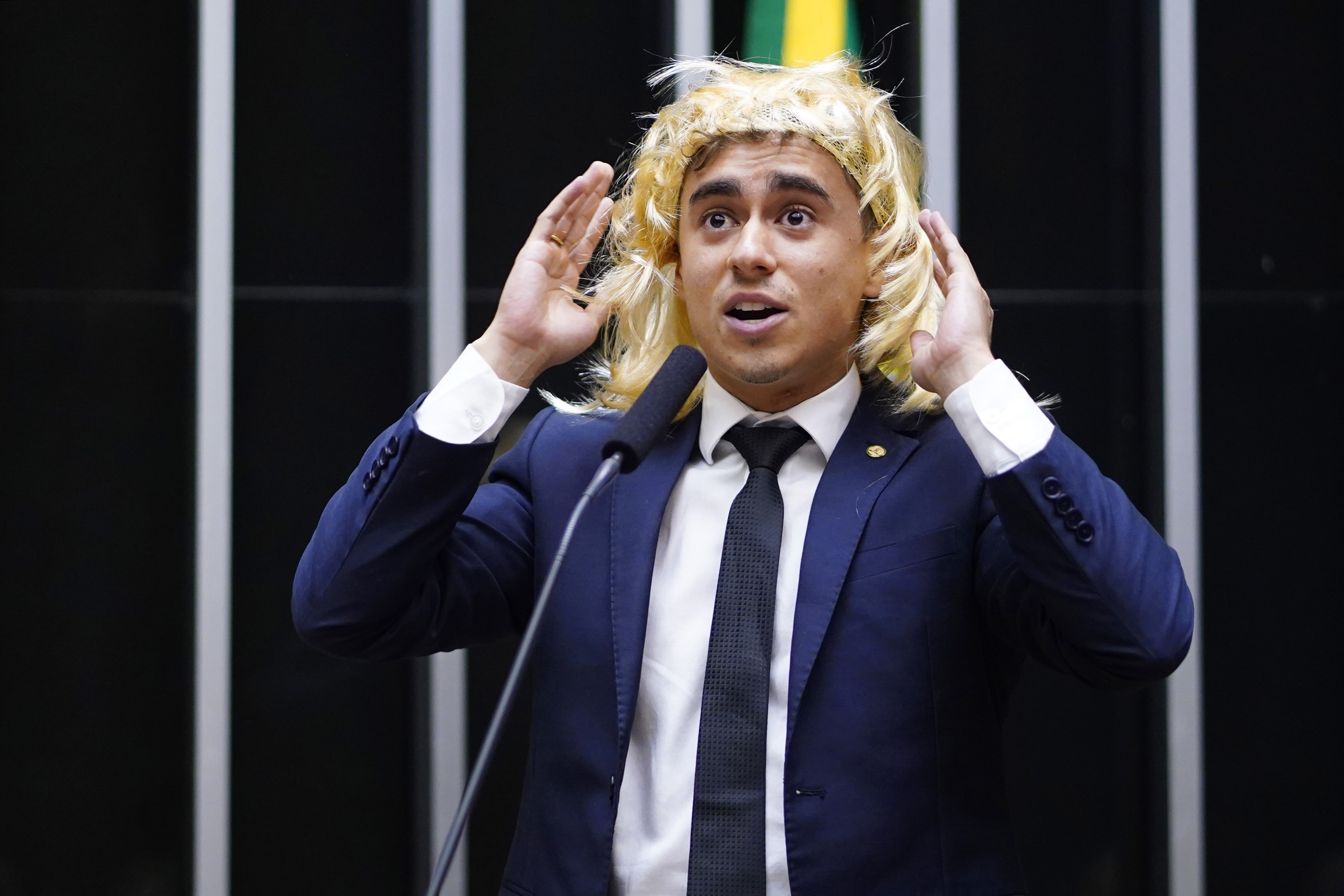
While wearing a blond wig, Nikolas asked to be called "Nikole".

Following his election as a councilor, Nikolas intentionally misgendered Duda Salabert, a transgender councilor in Belo Horizonte. Following this, Salabert filed a criminal complaint against him. There is no explicit criminal classification for transphobia and homophobia in Brazil, but the Supreme Federal Court decided in 2019 that they are crimes under the Law of Racism. In April 2023, Nikolas Ferreira was convicted, in first and second instance, and made to pay a compensation of R$80,000 for moral damages against Duda Salabert.

On March 8, 2023, International Women's Day, while serving as a federal congressman, Nikolas delivered a speech at the Chamber of Deputies podium with transphobic and anti-feminist statements. In addition to mocking trans women by wearing a blonde wig and asking to be called by the name "Nikole", he stated that "women are losing their space to men who feel like women". The President of the Chamber of Deputies, Arthur Lira, wrote a public reprimand on social media after the statements, stating that the Chamber of Deputies is not a space for discriminatory speeches. Federal congresswoman Erika Hilton, who is a trans woman, presented a petition in favor of revoking Nikolas' mandate, which collected 150,000 signatures within 24 hours. Three criminal complaints were filed by civil society organizations and a group of federal congressmen to the Supreme Federal Court after the statements. On the other hand, Nikolas received support from other far-right politicians, such as Eduardo Bolsonaro, who classified his behavior as excellent, as well as Valdemar Costa Neto, the president of Nikolas' party, who publicly defended him on social media. Nikolas' stance was associated with the growth of transphobic proposals in the federal, state, and municipal legislative bodies.

In July 2022, after exposing a 14-year-old transgender teenager on social media who was claiming the right to use the women's restroom according to her gender identity, he came under investigation by the Public Prosecutor's Office, accused of discrimination against LGBTQ people and violation of the Statute of the Child and Adolescent. In September 2023, as a result of this investigation, he became a defendant in a transphobia case.

== Electoral records ==
Year	Election	Party	Office	Votes	%	Results	Ref.
2020	Municipal election of Belo Horizonte	PRTB	Councillor	29,388	2.51%	Yes	
2022	General election in Minas Gerais	PL	Federal Deputy	1,492,047	13.31%	Yes	
2026	General election in Minas Gerais	PL	Federal Deputy	3,119,318	27.19%	Yes	

Chamber of Deputies (Brazil)
Preceded by Moses Rodrigues	Chair of the Education Commission; 2024–present	Incumbent
