= Free Grace case =

2020 incident in Michigan, US

- Date: May 16 – July 31, 2020
- Location: Oakland County, Michigan, U.S.
- Type: Youth incarceration
- First reporter: Jodi S. Cohen
- Participants: Grace (arrested)
- Charges: Probation violation for failure to complete homework
- Sentence: Incarceration at juvenile detention center
- Release granted by Michigan Court of Appeals

In May 2020 a 15-year-old Black sophomore from Beverly Hills, Michigan was incarcerated at a juvenile detention center for failure to complete her homework during virtual school. The teenager, referred to as Grace to conceal her identity, had been on probation for previous charges for theft and assault at the time of sentencing. Advocates and her defense team argued that she was not receiving the accommodations required by her Individualized Education Program (IEP) for her attention deficit hyperactivity disorder (ADHD) after her classes moved online due to coronavirus. Advocates also called the ruling evidence of systemic racism in the county's juvenile justice system.

Protests, an online petition, and public officials advocating for her release followed after a July 2020 Propublica article went viral under the hashtag #FreeGrace. The Michigan Court of Appeals granted her request for release in July 2020, after 78 days of incarceration.

== Background ==
At the time of her incarceration Grace was a Black, 15-year-old sophomore at Groves High School in Beverly Hills, Michigan. According to Charisse, her mother, Grace is an active student and has many strong friendships. Grace and Charisse were referred to by their middle names in the press coverage to conceal their identities.

Her mother raised Grace alone and they maintained a close relationship that was sometimes volatile. In 2018, Grace entered a court diversion program for incorrigibility due to previously yelling at and hitting her mother. In late 2019, Grace was charged with hitting her mother and soon after was charged with larceny for stealing another student's cellphone from a locker. She had no further police contact after those two incidents.

Her in-person classes at Groves High School moved online in April for social distancing requirements related to the COVID-19 pandemic. Grace stated in an interview for ProPublica that she was overwhelmed by online learning, and her ADHD diagnosis made her easily distracted. Charisse stated that the terms of Grace's IEP were not fulfilled when classes moved online.

At Grace's April 21 juvenile court hearing for the theft and assault charges, her case worker recommended that Grace be incarcerated at a residential facility for mental health and anger management treatment. The presiding Judge Mary Ellen Brennan of Oakland County Family Court Division instead sentenced her to "intensive probation", which included the use of a GPS tether and regular check-ins with a caseworker.

One week later, her caseworker reported her to the court for a parole violation because Charisse said that Grace had gone back to bed after their last check-in. The caseworker then checked in with Grace's teacher, who said she had failed to turn in an assignment. The teacher later stated that she did not think Grace's performance was out of step with the other students.

== Arrest ==
At a May court date Judge Brennan ruled that Grace had violated probation and found her "guilty on failure to submit to any schoolwork and getting up for school.” She sentenced Grace to be incarcerated at Children's Village juvenile detention center. The judge called Grace a threat to the community and stated that she had "not fulfilled the expectation with regard to school performance." Grace's caseworker testified that she was unaware of Grace's learning disability or any accommodations that she was entitled to. Grace was incarcerated in mid-May.

Grace and her mother requested that she be returned home at an early June court status hearing. Instead, Judge Brennan reaffirmed that Grace should continue to be incarcerated to get needed mental health services. The judge set a September 8 case review date, and Grace was transferred to a residential mental health facility.

== Aftermath ==
=== Criticism ===
Experts stated that the ruling was not in line with guidance around disciplinary responses amid the upheaval brought upon students by COVID-19. State disability watchdogs and juvenile justice advocates gave the opinion that the punishment was too harsh for having missed a homework assignment given the pandemic and the difficult time that most students had adjusting. They further stated that the ruling was a reflection of systemic racism in the judicial system and other over-criminalization of Black youth. Grace is a Black teenage girl in a predominantly white school district with racial disparities in juvenile justice outcomes.

=== Public response ===
The story was publicly released by Jodi S. Cohen in a July 14, 2020 ProPublica article. After its publication the story went viral under the hashtag #FreeGrace on Twitter, and a Change.org petition circulated that over 250,000 signed demanding Grace's release. Members of Congress, ACLU Michigan, and Oakland County officials and legislators also echoed calls for her release. Officials from her school district also released a statement that argued students should not be punished for failure to turn in homework in light of the pandemic.

There was a car caravan protest and a protest outside of Grace's school requesting her release; Black Lives Matter signs were among those displayed at the protest. On July 16, 2020, criminal justice reform organization Michigan Liberation hosted a rally of support for Grace outside of the Oakland County Circuit Courthouse, which drew approximately 200 people. Speakers denounced the prosecutor for bringing the charges. The day before her release, several members of Congress requested the intervention of Attorney General William Barr and Education Secretary Betsy DeVos.

== Release ==
At a July 20, 2020 hearing Grace again requested to return home. Judge Brennan denied the motion to release her and stated "if I were to grant the request to release you home today, I would be making a mistake, and I would be doing you a disservice."

Grace was ordered to be set free by the Michigan Court of Appeals on July 31, 78 days after her initial incarceration. She was released the same day. When Grace was released, she was still on probation.

The prosecutor's office submitted a statement of support for the ruling. Grace and her mother released a statement, thanking supporters.

== See also ==
- Race in the United States criminal justice system
- School-to-prison pipeline
- Adultification bias
