= Leandro e Leonardo =

Brazilian sertanejo duo

- Born: Luiz José da Costa (Leandro); Emival Eterno da Costa (Leonardo); August 15, 1961 (Leandro); July 25, 1963 (age 62) (Leonardo); Goianápolis, Goiás, Brazil
- Origin: Goiás
- Died: June 23, 1998 (aged 36) São Paulo, Brazil (Leandro)
- Genres: Sertanejo
- Years active: 1983–1998
- Labels: 3M Brasil; GEL Chantecler/Warner Music Brasil; BMG Brasil; Som Livre; Farol Musica

Leandro e Leonardo were a Brazilian sertanejo duo. The two brothers (third and fourth of eight siblings), Leandro (born Luiz José da Costa, August 15, 1961–June 23, 1998) and Leonardo (born Emival Eterno da Costa, born July 25, 1963), were from Goianápolis.

== History ==
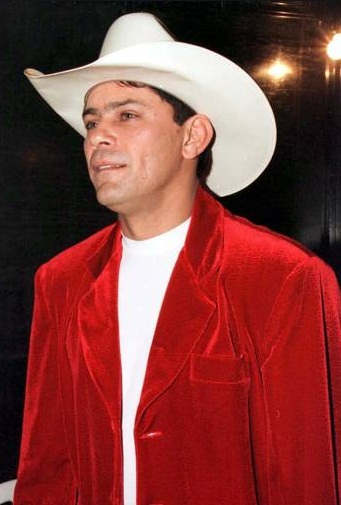
Luiz José da Costa at a performance as Leandro

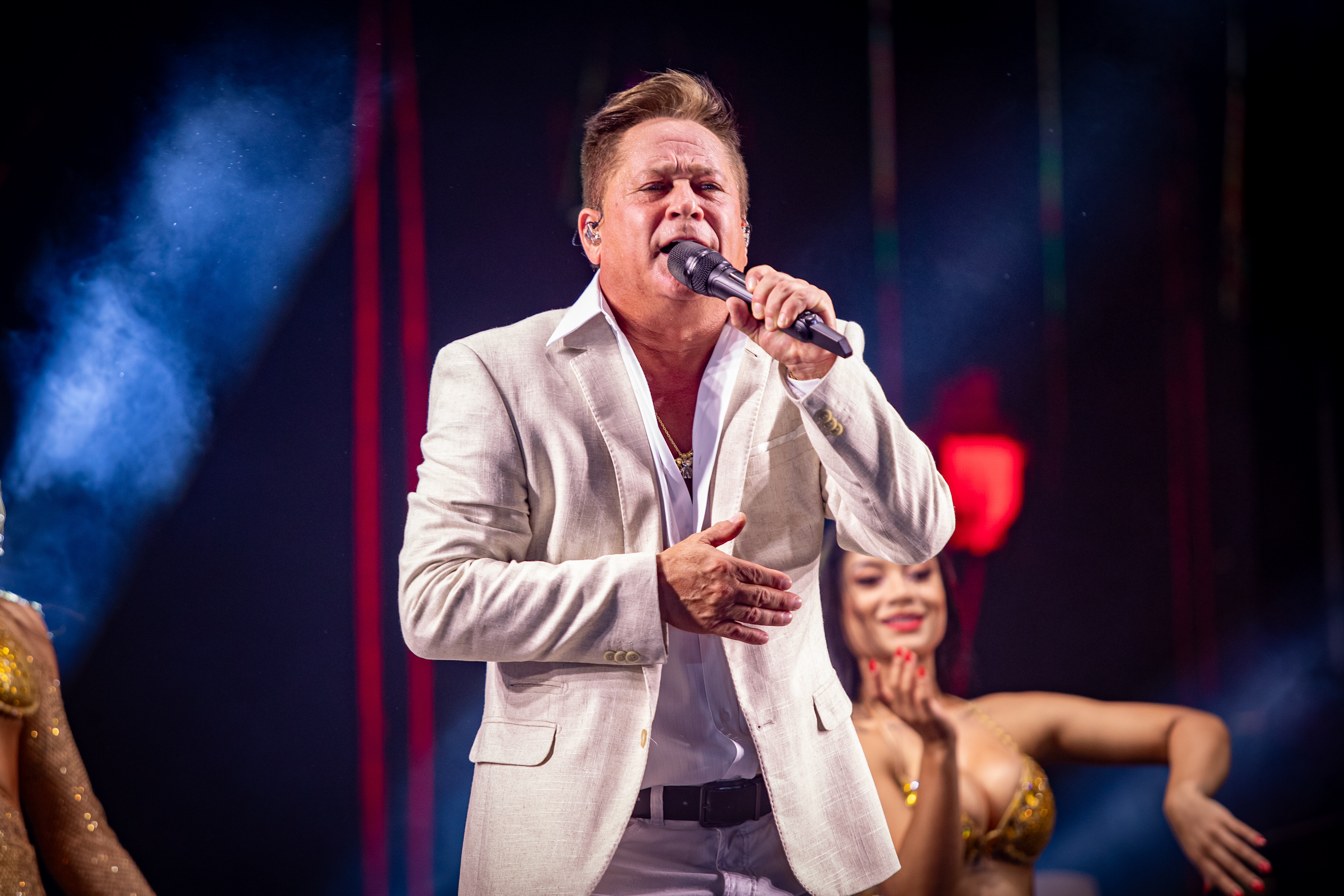
Leonardo in 2023.

The brothers were raised in a poor family in Brazil, and from a young age worked with their parents on tomato farms and did odd jobs such as shining shoes. Emival convinced his brother to move to the city, and the two practiced performing songs by Chitãozinho & Xororó, Roberto Carlos and The Beatles with Emival typically singing lead as Luiz sang harmonies and accompanied them on the guitar, then began playing locally in a group called Os Dominantes. After moving to Brasília, where they lived with their uncle Zé, who arranged work for Luiz as a salesman at a clothing store and for Emival at a pharmacy, while also booking gigs for them. When they began performing regularly as a duo it was as Leandro & Leonardo, the stage names being those also given to the twin boys recently born to the pharmacist Emival was working for.

After a few years of local and regional performances, they were offered spots on local television stations, and their first album came out in 1983. However, it wasn't until 1989 that they began to hit big on the Brazilian charts, with their Vol. 3 release. The group became superstars in the early 1990s, selling several million copies of their albums and obtaining a weekly show on Brazilian television. Music by Leandro and Leonardo sold 17 million records. The album Leandro & Leonardo Vol. 4 sold 3.3 million records and is the best-selling Brazilian country music album of all time.

=== Death of Leandro ===
After originally seeking treatment for back pain, Leandro was diagnosed with an Askin's tumor, a locally aggressive cancer occurring mostly in adolescents, on April 19, 1998 that had formed on the right side of his chest wall and already grown to the size of an orange. He died 65 days later of multiple organ dysfunction syndrome while undergoing chemotherapy at the Hospital São Luiz in São Paulo on June 23, following two unsuccessful surgeries to resect the tumor and restrict blood flow to it. At the time of his death the cancer was reported to be congenital, but ongoing research instead points to a carcinogenic pesticide he was exposed to while working at a tomato farm in his youth, later aggravated by heavy tobacco smoking, as the most likely cause. Leonardo continues to record as a solo artist.

== Personal lives ==
Luiz was married twice, the first ending in divorce and the second (to former model Andréa Motta, mother to the youngest two of his four children) in separation shortly before his cancer was discovered. Leonardo has six children, including sertanejo universitário singer Zé Felipe and actor João Guilherme. The sertanejo duo Pedro & Thiago were formed by Leonardo's son Pedro Leonardo Dantas Costa and Leandro's son Thiago Gonçalves Costa, and performed between 2002 and 2012, as Pedro left music after suffering a car accident.

== Discography ==
=== Albums ===
- 1983: Leandro & Leonardo
- 1986: Explosão de Desejos
- 1987: Leandro & Leonardo Vol. 2
- 1989: Leandro & Leonardo Vol. 3
- 1990: Leandro & Leonardo Vol. 4
- 1991: Leandro & Leonardo Vol. 5
- 1992: Leandro & Leonardo Vol. 6
- 1993: Leandro & Leonardo Vol. 7
- 1994: Leandro & Leonardo Vol. 8
- 1995: Leandro & Leonardo Vol. 9
- 1995: Temporal de Amor
- 1996: Leandro & Leonardo Vol. 10
- 1997: Leandro & Leonardo Vol. 11
- 1998: Um Sonhador

=== Special projects ===
- 1995: Amigos - Som Livre
- 1995: Leandro y Leonardo en Español
- 1996: Amigos - Som Livre
- 1996: Leandro y Leonardo en Español Vol.2
- 1997: Amigos - Som Livre
- 1997: Leandro y Leonardo Los Grandes Éxitos
- 1998: Leandro & Leonardo Só Para Crianças

== See also ==
- List of best-selling Latin music artists
