= Roberto Chacur =

Brazilian physician

- Roberto Chacur
- Medical career
- Profession: Physician, surgeon
- Field: Aesthetic medicine

Roberto Chacur (born 1 October 1980) is a Brazilian physician active in aesthetic medicine. His work has focused on cellulite treatment, subcision and non-surgical body contouring, including procedures involving the gluteal region. He has received recognition at the Aesthetic & Anti-Aging Medicine World Congress (AMWC), including Best Non-surgical Body Shaping awards in 2023 and 2026.

== Education and career ==
Chacur studied medicine at the Universidade Luterana do Brasil (Ulbra) in Canoas, Rio Grande do Sul, where he also completed a residency in general surgery.

He founded Clínica Leger in 2007 and GoldIncision in 2021. His work at the clinic has included facial and body aesthetic procedures; the clinic later established locations in São Paulo and Rio de Janeiro.

He was listed as a speaker at the 2026 AMWC Japan conference.

== Work ==
Chacur has been cited in Brazilian media in connection with cellulite treatment and gluteal aesthetic procedures. The coverage has included reporting by UAI on his association with the GoldIncision cellulite procedure, an interview with Metrópoles about lifestyle habits and cellulite, and a Folha de S.Paulo report on gluteal procedures that identified him as a physician who had treated Virginia Fonseca and quoted his comparison of injectable fillers and implants.

He has authored or co-authored publications on gluteal augmentation and fillers.

== Awards ==
In 2023, Chacur was listed by The PMFA Journal among the winners of the AMWC Awards in the Best Non-surgical Body Shaping category.

In 2026, for the second time, the official AMWC Awards winners page listed Chacur as the winner in the Best Non-surgical Body Shaping category for "Treatment for Cellulite - GoldIncision Protocol".

Brazilian magazine IstoÉ also reported that the cellulite protocol associated with Chacur had received the AMWC award for a second time.
