= Chitãozinho & Xororó =

Brazilian sertanejo duo

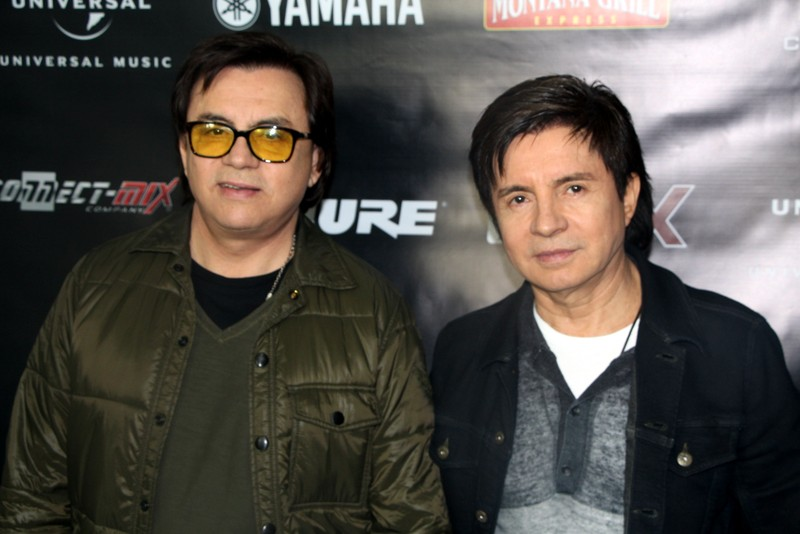
- Chitãozinho & Xororó in 2015

Background information
- Also known as: José & Durval
- Origin: Astorga, Paraná, Brazil Campinas, São Paulo, Brazil
- Genres: Sertanejo, Guarania, Norteño, Ranchera, Bolero, Country Rock
- Years active: 1970–present
- Labels: Copacabana (1969–1989); PolyGram (1989–1998); Universal Music (1998–present)
- Members: Chitãozinho; Xororó
- Website: www.chex.com.br

Chitãozinho & Xororó (Brazilian Portuguese: [ʃitɐ̃wˈziɲu i ʃoɾoˈɾɔ]) are a Brazilian sertanejo duo. Chitãozinho is the stage name of José Lima Sobrinho and Xororó of Durval de Lima. Their music, which combines traditional Brazilian caipira with pop, was instrumental in establishing the sertanejo genre. They have sold over 40 million albums since their first album was released in 1969.

Chitãozinho and Xororó are brothers, and were trained in music by their father, a vocalist and composer. They first performed publicly under the name Irmãos Lima, playing at festas juninas in Brazil. Their debut television appearance came in 1967 on Silvio Santos's show, and in 1969 they played on Cidade Sertaneja. Their first album was released in 1970, and the following year they appeared in the film No Rancho Fundo. Their fame and album sales steadily increased over the 1970s; in 1982, their Somos Apaixonados sold over a million copies. Their first TV special for SBT, featuring Roberto Carlos, came in 1986; in 1988, their performance at the Palace marked the widespread acceptance of sertanejo music among the urban middle and upper classes. In 1990, Chitãozinho & Xororó released the album Cowboy do Asfalto, including the hit "Evidências".

The duo continued to win international recognition, performing in Las Vegas in 1989 and in 1993 in Miami with The Bee Gees. Their first Spanish language album appeared in 1991. They founded a children's charity in their name in 1992. In 1993, they recorded the theme song for Guadalupe which peaked at number-one on the Hot Latin Songs chart. In 1994, Chitãozinho & Xororó recorded two songs, "Ela Não Vai Mais Chorar" and "Pura Emoção", with Billy Ray Cyrus, and in 1999 they sang "Coração Vazio" with Reba McEntire.

Their Spanish-language recordings are credited to José y Durval.

In 2021, their album Tempo de Romance won the Latin Grammy Award for Best Sertaneja Music Album.

Chitãozinho and Xororó are portrayed by Rodrigo Simas and Felipe Simas in the 2023 Globoplay biographical series As Aventuras de José & Durval.

== Discography ==
- Moreninha Linda (1969)
- Galopeira (1970)
- A Mais Jovem Dupla do Brasil (1972)
- Caminhos de Minha Infância (1974)
- A Força Jovem da Música Sertaneja (1976)
- A Força Jovem da Música Sertaneja - Vol. II (1977)
- 60 Dias Apaixonado (1979)
- Amante Amada (1981)
- Somos Apaixonados (1982)
- Amante (1984)
- Fotografia (1985)
- Coração Quebrado (1986)
- Meu Disfarce (1987)
- Nossas Canções Preferidas (1989)
- Os Meninos do Brasil (1989)
- Cowboy do Asfalto (1990)
- Nacimos pra Cantar (1991) - Spanish album
- Planeta Azul (1991)
- Ao Vivo (1992) - live
- Tudo por Amor (1993)
- Todo por Amor (1993) - Spanish album
- Coração do Brasil (1994)
- Chitãozinho & Xororó (1995)
- Clássicos Sertanejos (1996)
- Amigos - Vol. 1 (1996) - live - with Leandro & Leonardo and Zezé di Camargo & Luciano
- Al Sur de La Frontera (1997) - Spanish album
- Em Família (1997)
- Amigos - Vol. 2 (1997) - live - with Leandro & Leonardo and Zezé di Camargo & Luciano
- Na Aba do Meu Chapéu (1998)
- Amigos - Vol. 3 (1998) - live - with Leandro & Leonardo and Zezé di Camargo & Luciano
- Alô (1999)
- Amigos - Vol. 4 (1999) - live - with Leandro & Leonardo and Zezé di Camargo & Luciano
- Irmãos Coragem - 30 Anos - Ao Vivo (2000) - live
- Inseparáveis (2001)
- Direito de Viver (2001) - live - with various artists
- Festa do Interior (2002) – Grammy Award nominee
- Ao Vivo em Garibaldi (2003) - live
- Aqui o Sistema é Bruto (2004) – Grammy Award nominee
- Vida Marvada (2006) – Grammy Award winner
- Grandes Clássicos Sertanejos - Acústico (2007) – live - Grammy Award winner
- Se For Pra Ser Feliz (2009) – Grammy Award nominee
- 40 Anos – Nova Geração (2010) - live
- 40 Anos – Entre Amigos (2010) - live
- 40 Anos – Sinfônico (2011) – live - Grammy Award winner
- Irmão Caminhoneiro (2012)
- Do Tamanho do Nosso Amor (2013) - live – Latin Grammy Award for Best Sertaneja Music Album nominee
- Tom do Sertão (2015)
- Clássicos (2016) - with Bruno & Marrone - live
- Elas em Evidências (2017) - live - Grammy Award winner
- A História Continua (2019) - live - with Leonardo and Zezé di Camargo & Luciano
- Sucessos em Evidência (2020)
- Tempo de Romance (2021) - Grammy Award winner
- Legado (2022) - Grammy Award winner
- Ao Vivo no Radio City Music Hall Nova Iorque (2023) - live - Grammy Award nominee
- Outros Cantos (2023) - with Milton Nascimento - Grammy Award nominee
- José & Durval (2024) - Grammy Award winner
- Meninos de Roça (2026)

Singles only

- Hipótese (2014)
- Meu Irmão (2016)
- Pássaros (2021)
- Chuva (2023)

Xororó's solo singles

- Vida de Vô (2021)
- Luz (2021)
- Ei, Hello (2021)
- Pássaros (2021)

== See also ==
- List of best-selling Latin music artists
