= Felca =

Brazilian YouTuber

- Born: Felipe Bressanim Pereira; July 25, 1998 (age 28); Londrina, Paraná, Brazil

YouTube information
- Channels: Felca; felquinhas; Sofá do Felca
- Years active: 2019–present
- Genre: Comedy · sarcasm · self-deprecation · self-criticism
- Subscribers: 6.39 million (Felca); 2.81 million (felquinhas); 139 thousand (Sofá do Felca)
- Views: 426.9 million (Felca); 1 billion (felquinhas); 14.1 million (Sofá do Felca)
- Last updated: 20 May 2026

Felipe Bressanim Pereira (born July 25, 1998), better known as Felca, is a Brazilian YouTuber, influencer, and comedian. Known for his reaction videos and satires of internet trends, he started on the internet in 2012 as a streamer, producing video game content. Over time, he reformulated his content and began creating comedic videos, primarily with a self-deprecating tone.

He gained notoriety in 2023 by testing Virginia Fonseca's We Pink foundation, and with videos criticizing NPC livestreams on TikTok, which earned him R$31,000, donating all the money raised to charity. In 2025, he dismantled a network of sexual exploitation of minors with a single video about adultification, in which he denounced several people associated with the sexual exploitation of minors on the Internet, including the influencer Hytalo Santos, who lost his Instagram account after the negative repercussion, and sparked debates on the creation of laws to combat the sexual exploitation of minors on the Internet.

Felca is a part of channel Coisa Nossa, from Guaraná Antarctica.

== Career ==
Hailing from Londrina, Paraná, Felipe Bressanim Pereira, known by his pseudonym Felca, lives in São Paulo. He began his career as a streamer in 2012, playing video games in livestreams. He later shifted to creating humorous content, often with a self-deprecating tone, focusing on reaction videos and satires of trending Internet topics. He created his YouTube channel in July 2017.

On May 16, 2023, Felca posted a video testing influencer Virginia Fonseca's WePink foundation, applying it excessively, which he said left his skin sticky, with an unnatural appearance and a tacky feel, impairing his vision. In the end, when he tried unsuccessfully to remove it with water, he exposed the fraud. The video became a trending topic on Twitter and has over 19.9 million views on YouTube.

In September of that year, Felca once again went viral on NPC livestreams to criticize this trend—a type of livestreaming in which streamers imitate characters with childish voices and repetitive movements. The videos garnered one million followers in just four days and earned R$31,000, equivalent to about R$2,000 per hour, which popularized the trend and encouraged others to do the same. Felca donated the proceeds to charities such as the Instituto Ayrton Senna, Fundação Sara, Fundação HAJA, Amigos do Bem, and Ampara Animal.

During the gambling Parliamentary Inquiry Commission (CPI) investigation, he criticized betting site influencers, including Virginia Fonseca. After her testimony, Felca commented that the commission seemed like a "group of friends playing", citing ludopathy, a gambling addiction recognized by the WHO. In an interview with the Inteligência Ltda. podcast, he revealed that he had turned down R$50 million for a three-month contract with a bookmaker. Senator Soraya Thronicke, who was present at the interview, invited Felca to testify before the gambling Parliamentary Inquiry Commission (CPI) as a counterpoint. Because of his work and influence against gambling addiction, the Brazilian Psychiatric Association (ABP) has recognized him as a National Partner for Mental Health.

=== Video on adultification ===
On August 6, 2025, Felca posted a video titled "adultização" ("adultification") that garnered more than 20 million views in less than four days and earned him over a million subscribers in a short period. In the video, he exposed the exploitation of minors in online content creation, the existence of what Felca called the "Algoritmo P" ("P-Algorithm") which allows for the spread of content that can be used by pedophiles, and the platforms' lack of action to prevent searches or the use of terms related to child sexual exploitation. Among the influencers mentioned was Hytalo Santos, who had been under investigation by the Public Prosecutor's Office of Paraíba (MP-PB) since 2024 for the inappropriate exposure of teenagers on his social media. Another name mentioned was Kamyla Maria Silva, known as Kamylinha Santos, who was part of the "Turma do Hytalo," a group led by the influencer, since she was twelve years old, and had stated on her social media that she was adopted by Hytalo. She was also under investigation by the MP-PB for her sexually suggestive videos. Bel Peres and her mother Francinete, from the YouTube channel "Bel Para Meninas," were also cited. The channel was focused on playful and educational themes, but it received negative attention in 2020 after Bel, then a minor, participated in a challenge that caused vomiting and discomfort in those who watched it, raising the discussion that she was being exploited. Francinete removed the videos featuring her daughter from the channel, and regarding Felca's accusations, Bel claimed they were false and that the video clips were taken out of context.

Following the repercussion of Felca's video, Hytalo and Kamyla's Instagram profiles were deactivated. The court also ordered the demonetization of Hytalo's videos that featured minors and prohibited the influencer from contacting the minors mentioned in the legal proceedings, as well as their parents. The debate sparked by Felca was praised by celebrities like Juliette, who congratulated the influencer for his courage in addressing the topic and for his detailed investigation. Authorities in the fight against child sexual exploitation, such as Luciana Temer, president of the Liberta Institute, also praised him. Temer pointed out that although she, various journalists, judicial authorities, and organizations like Abrinq had previously addressed the Hytalo Santos case, only Felca's video managed to bring the issue to the general public and have consequences for those involved. Several proposed laws, some being called the Lei Felca ("Felca Law") were created by politicians, with at least 32 of them being introduced in the Chamber of Deputies. Hytalo was arrested a week after the video was released.

Felca reported receiving threats after the video was published, and began using an armored car and being escorted by security guards. He also announced lawsuits against 233 profiles on X for defamation related to pedophilia.

== Personal life ==
Felca has publicly revealed that he has suffered from depression, that he has a diagnosis of social anxiety disorder and believes he is on the autism spectrum. He dated digital content creator Heloísa Borsari for almost two years. On 20 October 2026, Felca published the video "fobia social" ("social phobia"), claiming that he was bullied during his adolescence and has problem with alcohol.
