= Hytalo Santos =

Brazilian digital influencer, singer and dancer

- Born: Hítalo José Santos Silva; August 9, 1998 (age 28); Cajazeiras, Paraíba, Brazil
- Occupation: Internet celebrity
- Spouse: Israel Nata Vicente (m. 2023)

Instagram information
- Page: hytalosantos
- Years active: 20??–2025
- Followers: 17 million

YouTube information
- Channel: @HytaloSantos
- Years active: 2017–2025
- Genres: Dance; singing
- Subscribers: 7 million

Hítalo José Santos Silva (born August 9, 1998), better known as Hytalo Santos, is a Brazilian digital influencer, singer and dancer. He has been accused of sexual and economic exploitation of minors and is currently in pre-trial detention.

== Biography ==
Born in the city of Cajazeiras, Paraíba, he began his artistic career as a dance teacher, recording videos with choreographies for his students to practice before class. Over time, these videos transformed into entertainment content on social media, allowing him to reach an audience beyond his hometown.

He created his YouTube channel in 2017. In 2018, he gained prominence by publishing videos with Eduarda Brasil, winner of that year's The Voice Kids, reaching around 50,000 followers and consolidating his digital presence. In the following years, he began frequently recording dance videos with teenagers, which further expanded his reach.

In 2024, Hytalo bought a house in the metropolitan region of João Pessoa which became frequented by various people, including minors, with whom he recorded dance content and the daily routine of the house.

Considered the sixth best influencer in Brazil by the marketing platform Favikon, he published a reality show called "Colônia de Férias com Hytalo Santos" (Holiday Camp with Hytalo Santos), featuring minors in intimate scenes and consuming alcoholic beverages, sponsored by online gamblings Fartura Premiações, Spicy Bets, and the jewelry store TH Joias. The teenagers wore shirts with the Fartura Premiações logo, which is prohibited by the Brazilian Statute of the Child and Adolescent.

In August 2025, Hytalo was preventively arrested, along with his husband, Israel Nata Vicente (known as Euro), in an investigation conducted by the Justice Department of Paraíba that investigates suspicions of sexual exploitation of minors, human trafficking and production of pornographic material involving vulnerable individuals. His YouTube channel, then with 7 million subscribers, was deleted, as well as his Instagram account, with 17 million followers.

== Personal life ==
Hytalo has been married to singer and influencer Israel Nata Vicente, better known as Euro, since November 2023. The ceremony was notable not only for the presence of celebrities like Deolane Bezerra, but mainly for the absence of celebrities who were invited, some even receiving an iPhone 15 Pro Max with their invitation. Hytalo reportedly spent R$700,000 on invitations alone, according to a report given to the newspaper Extra.

== Investigation by the Public Prosecutor's Office ==
=== Public Prosecutor's Office of Paraíba (MPPB) ===
At the end of 2024, the Public Prosecutor's Office of Paraíba opened an investigation against Hytalo Santos and his husband Euro based on a complaint to the Disque 100 hotline regarding "possible exploitation of children and adolescents through dances with sexual connotations." The complaint refers to minors who frequently lived with the couple in their home, whom Hytalo called "kids" and, in the case of some girls, "daughters." The minors participated in the content that the influencer produced for social media, mainly dance videos and videos of the daily routine at home. The young people were mostly from situations of social vulnerability and received offers of financial support, housing, food, and education from the influencer. Regarding the investigation, Hytalo commented on his own social media, stating:

Many people come to my house. My children spend a good part of their time with me, and a good part with their mothers. The mothers have always been involved in everything. Everything has the consent of the mothers and now of the girls, who are emancipated.

=== Felca's complaint ===
On August 6, 2025, YouTuber Felipe Bressanim Pereira, known online as Felca, published a 50-minute video titled "Adultização" (Adultification), which garnered over 40.5 million views in 8 days. In the video, Felca denounces various instances of the phenomenon online, ranging from milder situations like "child coaches" and child investors, to the facilitation of the spread of child exploitation and pornography content by social media algorithms. One example used by the influencer was Hytalo Santos' relationship with his "kids," where videos, since 2020, frequently depicted minors in sexualized and/or embarrassing situations. On August 8, following widespread repercussions from the case due to Felca's video, Hytalo's Instagram account was suspended. On the 12th, the Justice Department of Paraíba ordered the suspension of all of Hytalo Santos's social media accounts and the demonetization of his content, as well as prohibiting the influencer from contacting the minors involved in the case.

=== Labor Public Prosecutor's Office of Paraíba (MPT-PB) ===
In a video published on August 12, prosecutor Flávio Gondim, from the Labor Public Prosecutor's Office of Paraíba (MPT-PB), reported that he was investigating the existence of child labor exploitation in Hytalo Santos' content. According to Gondim, more than 50 videos of the influencer were analyzed and more than 15 testimonies were collected from people involved in the production of this content. On the 18th, the MPT-PB requested the freezing of assets belonging to Hytalo and his husband. The measure requested the freezing of "five luxury vehicles, companies and other assets and values up to the limit of R$ 20 million". According to the MPT-PB, the freeze would aim to guarantee the payment of "compensation for collective moral damages and measures of reparation and assistance to the victims".

=== Gaeco-PB ===
At the end of August, the case began to be investigated by Gaeco-PB (Organized Crime Combat Group of Paraíba). On September 15, the MPPB indicted Hytalo Santos and his husband, Euro, for the crimes of human trafficking, production of pornographic material and facilitating prostitution and sexual exploitation of vulnerable individuals based on Gaeco's investigations that revealed a premeditated modus operandi involving "fraudulent tactics, promises of fame and material advantages to attract victims in vulnerable situations".
