= Virginia Fonseca =

Brazilian digital influencer (born 1999)

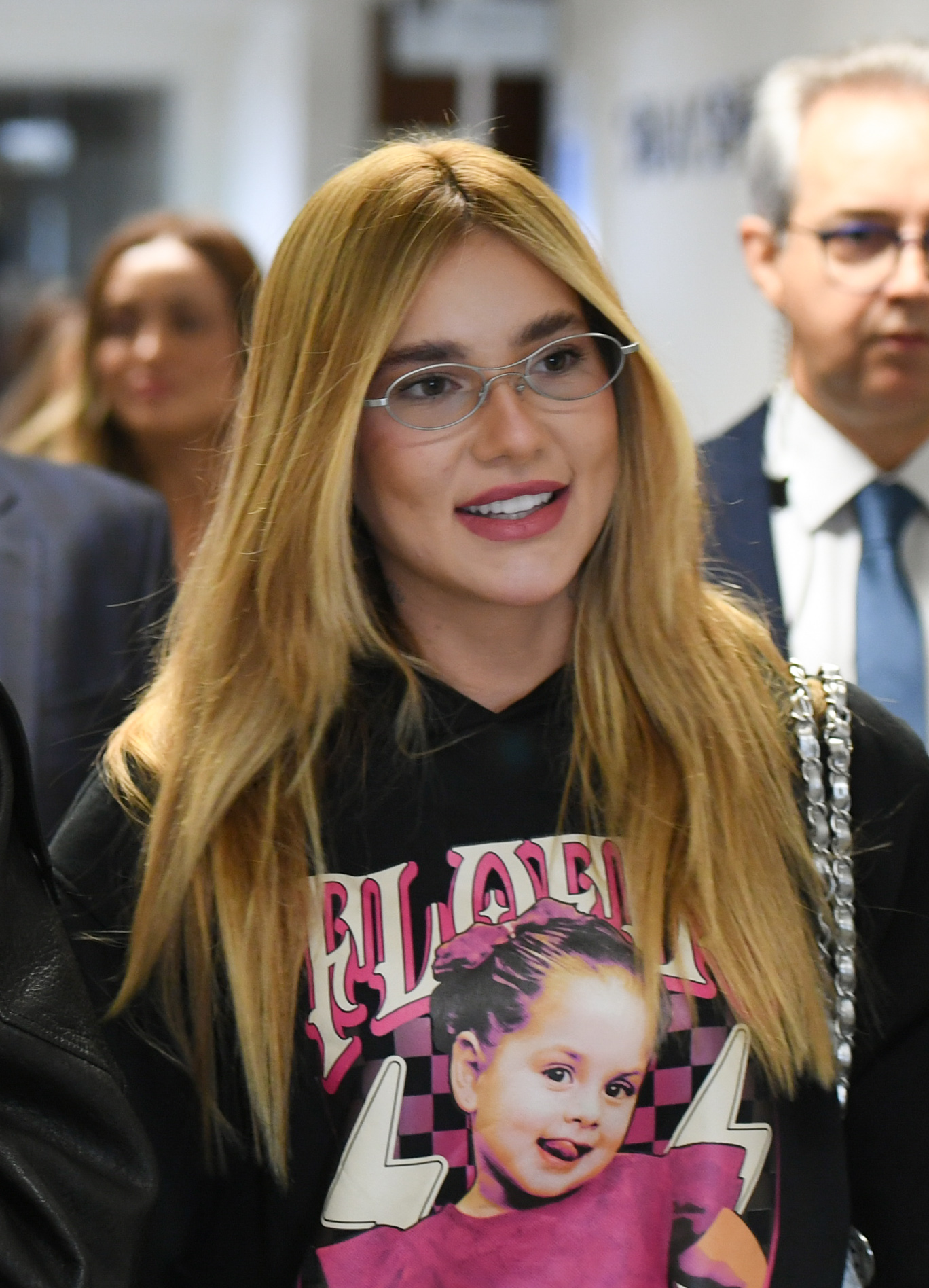
- Virginia at the Brazilian Federal Senate in 2025
- Born: Virginia Pimenta da Fonseca Serrão Costa; April 6, 1999 (age 27); Danbury, Connecticut, U.S.
- Citizenship: Brazil; United States
- Occupations: Presenter; entrepreneur; digital influencer; YouTuber
- Organizations: ADR (formerly); Talismã Digital
- Spouse: Zé Felipe (m. 2021–2025)

YouTube information
- Channel: Virgínia Fonseca
- Years active: 2016–present
- Genres: Vlogging; lifestyle
- Subscribers: 11.8 million
- Views: 1.6 billion
- Last updated: June 11, 2026

Virginia Pimenta da Fonseca Serrão Costa (born April 6, 1999), better known as Virginia Fonseca or simply Virginia, is a Brazilian-American television presenter, entrepreneur and digital influencer.

Virginia is a Brazilian American of Portuguese descent, but she stated that even though she has US citizenship, she does not speak English and that she never wished to or went back to her country of origin, the United States, ever since moving to Brazil.

After a 2-year-long relationship with YouTuber Pedro Rezende, Virginia revealed her new relationship with singer Zé Felipe on June 27, 2020. On March 26, 2021, Felipe and Virginia got married during a private ceremony in his house. She has three children with him: Maria Alice, born May 30, 2021; Maria Flor, born October 22, 2022; and José Leonardo, born September 8, 2024.

On May 27, 2025, Virginia and Zé Felipe announced their separation.

== Career ==
=== 2016–2020: Career start and the ADR ===
In 2016, the then sixteen-year-old Virginia started filming her first YouTube videos. With her third video, in which she presents her Brazilian funk playlist, she achieved the mark of 100,000 subscribers. The next year, having gone back to Brazil, she had a short and unsuccessful DJ career. Then, seeing as it wasn't going well, she was invited to make YouTube videos with the Brazilian YouTuber Pedro Rezende.

Thanks to Rezende's already established fame, and her joining his agency, the ADR (short for Rezende's Alliance), Virginia's own visibility and popularity rose. It grew even more once the two announced that they were in a relationship. She also became a recurring guest in his videos, known for their challenges and games.

In 2020, Virginia ended her relationship with Rezende, being forced to pay a fine of 2 million Brazilian reais, due to a breach of contract with his agency. In the same year, after revealing her new relationship with the Brazilian country singer Zé Felipe, she became a model and dancer for his music videos: promoting, dancing and creating choreographies for them.

=== 2020–2023: Notority and WePink ===
In 2020, after the announcement of her first pregnancy, Virginia became even more popular, thanks specially to an allegation that she had got pregnant for fame and money. In the same year, she had a cameo in her husband's song Tranquilita, but Virginia later revealed that she did not wish to follow a singing career.

Still in 2021, she founded 3 businesses: the advertising and publicity agency, Talismã Digital; the skin care and beauty products brand, WePink; and the aesthetic clinic SK Aesthetic. The last one being sold the following year for an unknown amount of money. In 2022, with the popularity gained by the birth of her second daughter, Virginia launched the children's cosmetics brand Maria's Baby by Virginia Fonseca.

In 2023, Virginia was announced as employed by the Brazilian television network SBT.

=== 2024–present: Sabadou com Virginia ===
On April 6, 2024, on her 25th birthday, Virginia premiered on television with her program Sabadou com Virginia (Saturday with Virginia). On debut, it won second place in a popularity poll by the Ibope and was SBT's most viewed program.

== Public image ==
=== Parliamentary Inquiry Commission on Betting ===
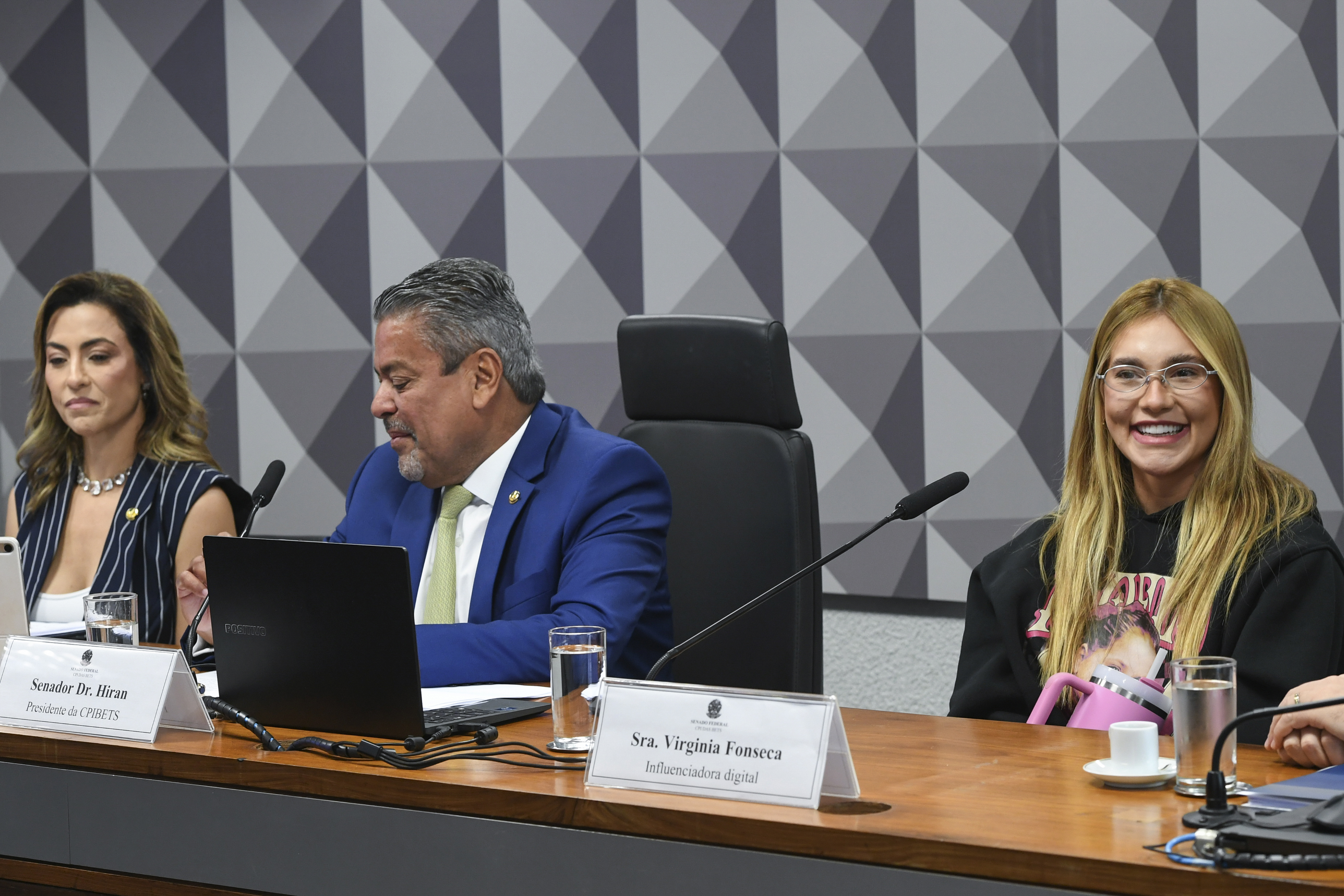
Virginia at the Parliamentary Inquiry Commission on Betting

On 13 May 2025, Virginia testified before the parliamentary Inquiry Commission on Betting regarding her "central role" in promoting online gambling on social media.

Virginia drew attention for the innocent image she adopted, in contrast to the designer outfits she usually wears in her daily life. For the occasion, she chose light makeup, a sweatshirt featuring her daughter's face, and a pink insulated tumbler. Her appearance quickly became one of the top trending topics on X, with many commentators describing it as "meticulously calculated."

The live broadcast of the hearing on TV Senado set the channel's highest audience of the year, reaching 135,000 concurrent viewers, while total views surpassed 1 million. During her testimony, Virginia frequently smiled broadly and maintained that she had never been aware of the social harm caused by online gambling. In one moment that drew laughter, she accidentally sucked on the microphone, mistaking it for the straw of her tumbler; many users on X believed the incident appeared staged.

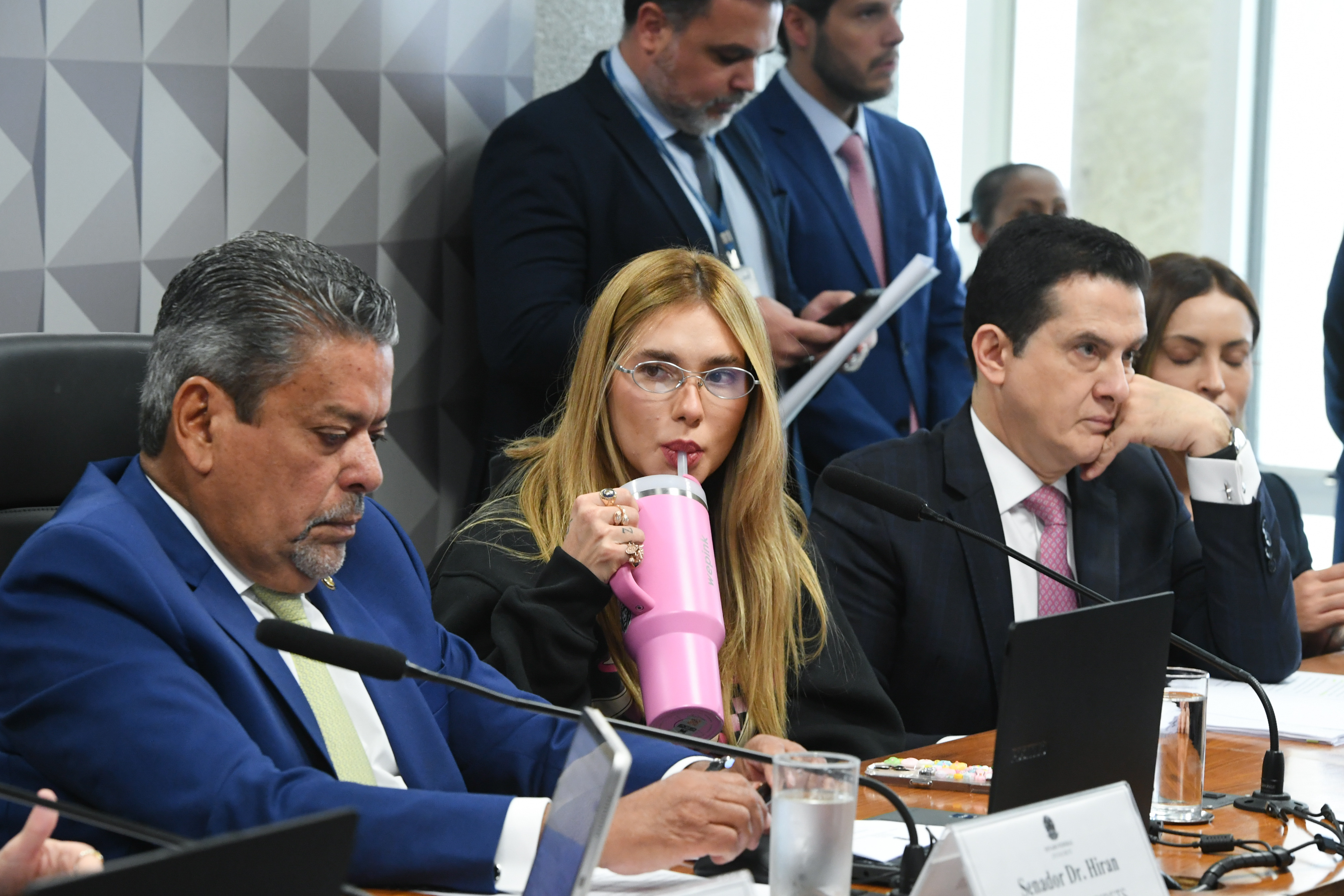
During the hearing, Virginia drank water from her pink insulated tumbler, which attracted the attention of internet users.

During her testimony, she acknowledged that she had used fake accounts to simulate online gambling and generate screenshots of fictitious betting winnings in order to encourage her followers to place bets. She said that she did not regret her actions and that there was nothing she could do to help her followers.

About 20 minutes after the hearing ended, Virginia announced discounts on her makeup line on her Instagram account. Her conduct during the hearing was widely criticized, resulting in the loss of approximately 600,000 followers.

The CPI's final report alleged that Virginia had signed agreements with betting companies under which she would receive 30% of her followers' total gambling losses, provided they placed their bets through links she had promoted. Although she denied the practice, the contract she submitted was cited in the report as confirming the arrangement. The report recommended that she be indicted for deceptive advertising and fraud, along with 15 other individuals and companies, including influencer Deolane Bezerra. By a vote of four to three, however, the Parliamentary Inquiry Commission rejected the report and concluded its work without adopting any measures. It was the first time in ten years that a Brazilian Federal Senate CPI had rejected its final report.

=== Fortune ===
According to Forbes, her brand registered a profit of 10 million Brazilian Reais in October 2021, only a month after launch. Her company was reported to have sold 110,000 perfume bottles in March 2023 alone, as reported by newspaper O Globo, reaching a profit of R$17 million three months after launch. Virginia herself claimed to gain R$500,000 per month, for a total of R$6,000,000 per year. The WePink company reportedly profited 168.5 million in 2022.

=== Makeup ===
In March 2023, a makeup foundation was launched by Virginia's brand WePink Beauty and it was severely criticised for false advertising. Virginia claimed that her makeup had "imported-product quality" and was a "dermomake", a type of makeup that unites beauty with skin care. To quote Virginia herself: "Our foundation takes care of the skin, and that's what's distinctive about it". However, a YouTube video by the beauty influencer Karen Bachini later revealed that the product was, in fact, registered as grade 1 by the Brazilian Health Regulatory Agency (Anvisa), thus, it's incapable of taking care of the skin due to its minimal level of vitamin E, hyaluronic acid and nicotinamide, all of which were claimed by Virginia to be of a higher amount.

The foundation was criticised for drying the skin, highlighting frown lines and nose exocrine glands, not being resistant to water, and, in some cases, for causing redness of the skin. The marketing campaign was also criticised for devaluing Brazilian products in favor of promoting Virginia's brand. The initial price of R$199 (about $36 US Dollars) was also put under critique, being subsequently altered. The Brazilian YouTuber Felca made a video about the foundation that went viral due to the poor quality and usage of the product, "I will have nightmares" he claimed.

After the controversy, many similar cases emerged on social media. Virginia was accused of promoting a brand that used names and images for false advertising, offering a course that didn't accomplish what it had promised, and demanding money in exchange for pictures with fans.

=== Plagiarism and product scam ===
In October 2022, Virginia launched a baby focused hygiene brand with the trademark of Maria's Baby by Virginia Fonseca. For which she was accused of plagiarizing the name, visual identity and product labels of American entrepreneur Kylie Jenner's brand Kylie Baby by Kylie Jenner.

In 2023, Virginia launched a sunglasses collection with the brand By IK, but consumers reported that they hadn't received their product after their purchase.

=== Motherhood ===
In April 2023, a video of the couple's eldest daughter Maria Alice went viral on social media, being highly discussed by Brazilian netizens. The journalist Evaristo Costa commented "The mother is the one who raises (the child)".

Virginia's husband, Zé Felipe filmed an answer video using offensive language against the journalist, who promptly apologised. The repercution of the video caused other controversies to resurge, for example the one over the marketing campaign that used the couple's 7-day-old daughter, one over the end of the breastfeeding period, the use of babysitters during an international trip, etc.

== Filmography ==
=== Television ===
| Year | Title | Role | Notes |
|---|---|---|---|
| 2023–present | Teleton | Presenter | |
| 2024–present | Sabadou com Virginia | Presenter | |

=== Internet ===
| Year | Title | Role | Notes | Ref. |
|---|---|---|---|---|
| 2016–presente | Virgínia Fonseca | Herself | YouTube | |
| 2018–2020 | rezendeevil | Herself | YouTube | |

=== Music videos ===
| Year | Title | Artist | Ref. |
|---|---|---|---|
| 2020 | "Virgínia" | Zé Felipe | |
| 2020 | "Só Tem Eu" | Zé Felipe | |
| 2021 | "Toma Toma Vapo Vapo" | Zé Felipe e MC Danny | |
| 2021 | "Bandido" | Zé Felipe e MC Mari | |
| 2021 | "Tranquilita" | Zé Felipe e Virginia Fonseca | |
| 2022 | "Malvada" | Zé Felipe | |
| 2022 | "Onde Anda" | Calema e Zé Felipe | |
| 2022 | "50 Cópias" | Zé Felipe | |
| 2023 | "Facilita Aí" | Zé Felipe | |
| 2023 | "Marrento" | Zé Felipe | |
| 2023 | "Summer" | Zé Felipe | |
| 2023 | "Vai Magrin" | Zé Felipe e MC Rica | |
| 2023 | "Vacilão" | Igow, Zé Felipe e Wesley Safadão | |

=== Theater ===
| Year | Title | Role | Ref. |
|---|---|---|---|
| 2019 | O mundo do Rezende | Herself | |

== Awards and nominations ==
| Year | Awards | Category | Nomination | Result | Ref. |
|---|---|---|---|---|---|
| 2019 | Brazilian Juvenile Awards | Digital revelation | Virginia Fonseca | Nominated | |
| 2020 | Brazilian Juvenile Awards | Best TikToker | Virginia Fonseca | Nominated | |
| 2020 | Brazilian Juvenile Awards | Best Fitness Influencer | Virginia Fonseca | Nominated | |
| 2020 | Contigo! Online Awards | Couple of the year | Virginia Fonseca e Zé Felipe | Nominated | |
| 2021 | iBest Award | TikToker of the Year (iBest Academy votes) | Virginia Fonseca | Won | |
| 2021 | iBest Award | TikToker of the Year (popular vote) | Virginia Fonseca | TOP3 | |
| 2021 | iBest Award | Behavior and Family (popular vote) | Virginia Fonseca | Nominated | |
| 2021 | Meus Prêmios Nick | Challenger of the Year | Virginia Fonseca | Nominated | |
| 2021 | Meus Prêmios Nick | Ship of the Year | Zé Felipe e Virginia | Nominated | |
| 2021 | Área Vip Award | Best Influencer | Virginia Fonseca | Nominated | |
| 2021 | Área Vip Award | Cuteness of the Year | Maria | Nominated | |
| 2021 | Prêmio Jovem Brasileiro | Best TikToker | Virginia Fonseca | Nominated | |
| 2021 | Prêmio Jovem Brasileiro | YouTuber of the Year | Virginia Fonseca | Nominated | |
| 2021 | Prêmio Jovem Brasileiro | Instagram Queen | Virginia Fonseca | Nominated | |
| 2021 | Prêmio Jovem Brasileiro | Favorite Channel | Virginia Fonseca | Nominated | |
| 2021 | Prêmio Jovem Brasileiro | I Ship It | Zé Felipe e Virginia | Nominated | |
| 2021 | Internet Trophy | Revelation of the Year | Virginia Fonseca | Nominated | |
| 2021 | TikTok Awards | Musa das Trends | Virginia Fonseca | Won | |
| 2021 | MTV Miaw | MIAW Icon | Virginia Fonseca | Nominated | |
| 2021 | MTV Miaw | Hitou no Passinho | Virginia Fonseca | Won | |
| 2021 | MTV Miaw | Feat. Nacional | Zé Felipe e Virginia Fonseca | Won | |
| 2021 | MTV Miaw | #EuShippo | Zé Felipe e Virginia Fonseca | Nominated | |
| 2021 | Prêmio Contigo! Online | Couple of the Year | Zé Felipe e Virginia Fonseca | Won | |
| 2021 | Prêmio Contigo! Online | Best Influencer | Virginia Fonseca | Nominated | |
| 2022 | Prêmio iBest | Comportamento e Família (voto popular) | Virginia Fonseca | TOP3 | |
| 2022 | Prêmio iBest | Instagrammer do Ano (voto popular) | Virginia Fonseca | TOP3 | |
| 2022 | Prêmio iBest | TikToker do Ano (voto popular) | Virginia Fonseca | TOP3 | |
| 2022 | Prêmio iBest | TikToker do Ano (voto academia iBest) | Virginia Fonseca | TOP3 | |
| 2022 | Prêmio iBest | Creator do Ano (voto popular) | Virginia Fonseca | Nominated | |
| 2022 | Prêmio iBest | Podcast (voto popular) | PodCats (Camila Loures e Virginia Fonseca) | TOP3 | |
| 2022 | Prêmio iBest | Fandom Brasil (voto popular) | Virginia Fonseca | Nominated | |
| 2022 | Prêmio Área Vip | Melhor Influencer | Virginia Fonseca | Nominated | |
| 2022 | Prêmio Contigo! Online | Casal do ano | Zé Felipe e Virginia Fonseca | Won | |
| 2022 | Prêmio Contigo! Online | Melhor Influenciador | Virginia Fonseca | Nominated | |
| 2022 | MTV Miaw | Podcast nosso de cada dia | PodCats (Camila Loures e Virginia Fonseca) | Won | |
| 2022 | MTV Miaw | Hitou No Passinho | Virginia Fonseca | Won | |
| 2022 | MTV Miaw | Dupla de Milhões | Virginia e Zé Felipe | Won | |
| 2022 | People's Choice Awards | Influenciador Brasileiro do Ano | Virginia Fonseca | Won | |
| 2022 | Prêmio Jovem Brasileiro | Rainha do Insta | Virginia Fonseca | Nominated | |
| 2022 | Prêmio Jovem Brasileiro | YouTuber do Ano | Virginia Fonseca | Won | |
| 2022 | Prêmio Jovem Brasileiro | Eu Shippo | Virlipe (Virginia e Zé Felipe) | Nominated | |
| 2022 | Prêmio Jovem Brasileiro | Meu Podcast Preferido | PodCats (Camila Loures e Virginia Fonseca) | Nominated | |
| 2022 | BreakTudoAwards | Instagrammer do Ano | Virginia Fonseca | Nominated | |
| 2023 | TikTok Awards | Surra de Beleza | Virginia Fonseca | Nominated | |
| 2023 | Prêmio Jovem Brasileiro | Eu Shippo | Virginia e Zé Felipe | Nominated | |
| 2023 | Prêmio Jovem Brasileiro | Rei/Rainha do Insta | Virginia Fonseca | Nominated | |
