= Askin's tumor =

Askin's tumor is a rare, primitive neuroectodermal tumor which arises from the soft tissues of the chest wall, particularly of the paravertebral region. It was first described by Askin et al. in 1979. Askin's tumor is now recognized as part of the Ewing's sarcoma family of tumors. This neoplasm tended to recur locally, but did not seem to disseminate as widely as some of the other small cell tumors of childhood such as rhabdomyosarcoma or neuroblastoma.
