= Zé Felipe =

Brazilian singer (born 1998)

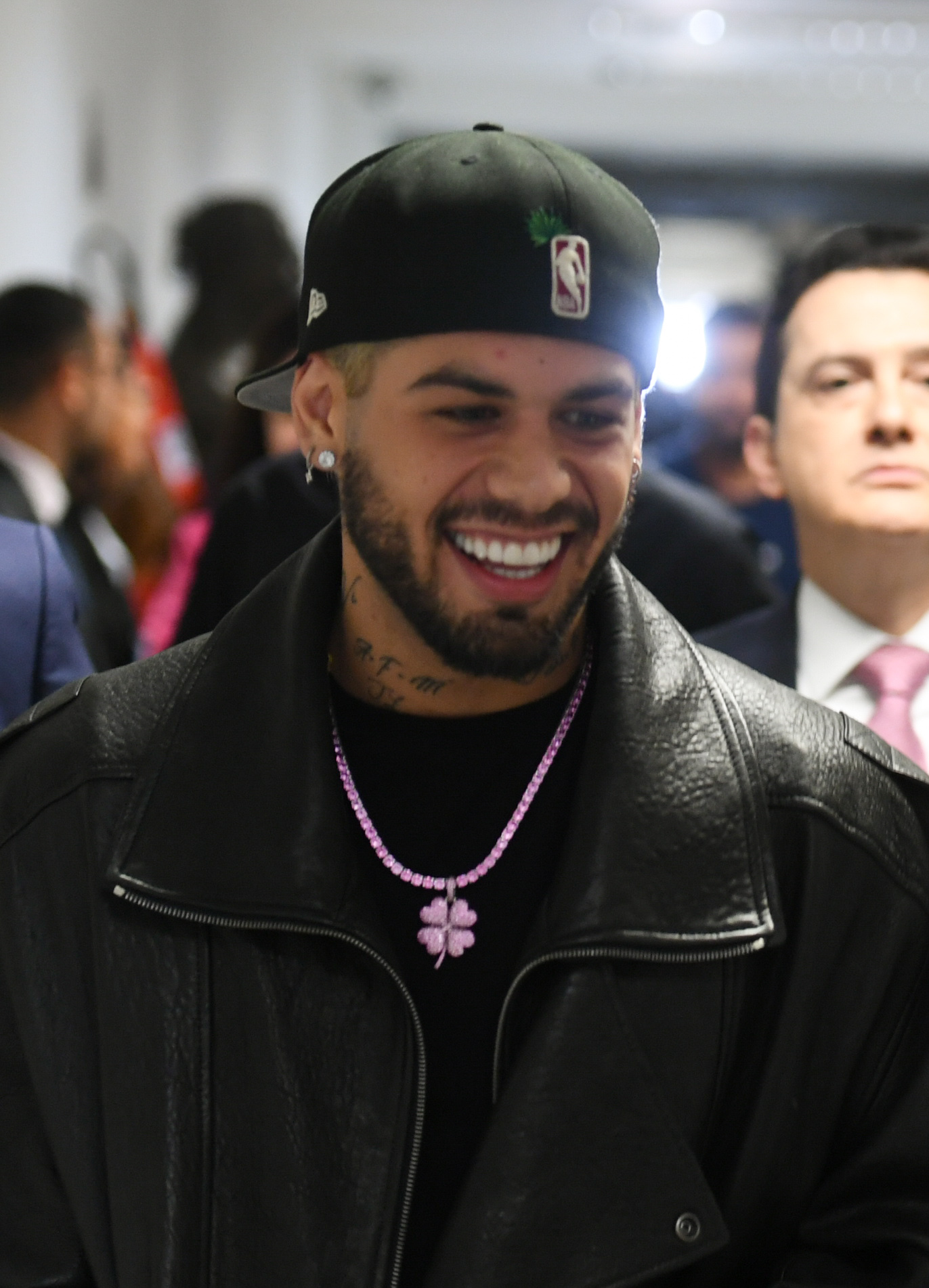
- Zé Felipe in May 2025
- Born: José Felipe Rocha Costa; 21 April 1998 (age 28); Goiânia, Goiás, Brazil
- Occupations: Singer, songwriter
- Years active: 2014-present
- Spouse: Virginia Fonseca (m. 2021–2025)
- Children: 3
- Musical career
- Genres: Sertanejo universitário, pop
- Instrument: Vocals
- Labels: Sony Music, Som Livre
- Website: zefelipe.com.br

José Felipe Rocha Costa (born 21 April 1998), better known as Zé Felipe, is a Brazilian singer and songwriter.

== Career ==
Growing up in an artistic family, in 2009, he learned his first guitar chords with his father Leonardo, a famous sertanejo player and performed in public and various occasions. In December 2013, Zé Felipe appeared in his father's live album and DVD Leonardo – 30 Ano with a medley of "Deixaria Tudo" / "Te Amo Demais" / "Coração Espinhado".

In 2014, he was signed to Sony Music, and appeared in the live entertainment show Domingão do Faustão. In September 2014 he debuted with his album premiered his race in the televising program Domingão of Faustão. In October 2014 he released his debut album entitled Você e Eu (meaning You and Me) that sold 50,000 copies followed by the album Proibido é Mais Gostoso in June 2016 that sold 40,000 copies and was certified gold by Pro-Música Brasil. In 2017 he released his live album and DVD Na Mesma Estrada.

== Personal life ==
Felipe was married from 2021 to 2025 to blogger Virginia Fonseca. They had two daughters, born in 2020 and 2022 and a son, born in 2024.

== Discography ==
=== Studio albums ===
Album listings
Album and details
Notes
Você e Eu
- Released: 28 October 2012
- Formats: CD, digital download
- Copies sold: 50,000 copies

No.	Title	Writer(s)	Length
1.	"Saudade de Você"	Adair Cardoso	2:42
2.	"Cópia Autenticada"	Paula Mattos	3:12
3.	"Você Mente"	Marquinhos Maraial, Beto Caju, Renato Moreno	3:04
4.	"Vai Ser Gostoso"	Paula Mattos, Silmara Nogueira, Pedro Viana, Vini Perez	3:01
5.	"Você e Eu"	Bruno César, Eder Brandão, Cabrera	3:16
6.	"Simbora Mô"	Marquinhos Maraial, Beto Caju	3:02
7.	"Tá Bom do Jeito Que Tá"	Ivan Medeiros, Marcelo Melo, Vivi Abreu, Paula Mattos	3:10
8.	"Então Valeu"	Marco Aurélio, Valéria Costa, Fred Liel, Gustavo	3:09
9.	"Pegação"	Tonho Copque, Elivandro Cuca, Raimundo Bahia	2:58
10.	"Tá Com Saudade"		2:52
11.	"Pagou a Língua"		3:07
12.	"Roubou Meu Coração"	Tiago Doidão	3:30
13.	"Tô Tô"	Tiago Marcelo, Paula Mattos, Diego Kraemer	3:03

Proibido é Mais Gostoso
- Released: 17 June 2016
- Formats: CD, digital download
- Record label: Sony, Talismã

No.	Title	Writer(s)	Length
1.	"Sua Sina"		2:30
2.	"Esse Refrão é Pra Você"		2:49
3.	"Tirar a Limpo"		3:11
4.	"A Gente Deu Sorte"		2:37
5.	"Mil e uma"		2:19
6.	"Maquiagem Borrada"		2:42
7.	"Escolha Errada"		2:45
8.	"Proibido é Mais Gostoso"		2:22
9.	"Deixa Que Ela Decide" (feat. Pedro Paulo & Alex)	Pedro Paulo, Guilherme Rosa, Ricco Montana	2:47
10.	"Curtição"		3:28
11.	"Muleke Top Zica"	Diego Monteiro, Vitor de Simone	2:25
12.	"E Agora, José?"		2:36
13.	"Não Me Toca" (feart. Ludmilla)	Anselmo Ralph, Erdzan Saidov, Nelson Klasszik, Cabrera, Paula Mattos, Zé Felipe	3:25
14.	"Olha Ela"		2:31

=== Live albums ===
Album listings
Album and details	Notes
Na Mesma Estrada: Released: 15 September 2017; Formats: CD, digital download; Record label: Som Livre	
Ao Vivo em Goiânia: Released: 13 September 2019; Formats: CD, digital download; Record label: Som Livre	

=== Live DVDs ===
DVD listings
Album and details	Notes
Na Mesma Estrada: Released: 15 September 2017; Formats: DVD, digital download; Record label: Som Livre	

=== Singles ===
Year	Single	Peak positions	Album
Year	Single	BRA	Album
2014	"Saudade de Você"	3	Você e Eu
2015	"Você Mente"	5	Você e Eu
2015	"Você e Eu"	6	Você e Eu
2016	"Não Me Toca" (feat. Ludmilla)	1	Proibido é Mais Gostoso
2016	"Maquiagem Borrada"	5	Proibido é Mais Gostoso
2016	"Curtição"	5	Proibido é Mais Gostoso
2017	"O Errado Sou Eu"	6	Na Mesma Estrada
2017	"Você Não Vale Nada" (feat. MC Menor)	8	Na Mesma Estrada
2018	"Banheira de Espuma"	–	Non-album release
2018	"My Baby" (feat. Naiara Azevedo & Furacão Love)	22	Non-album release
2018	"Amor Todo Dia"	18	Non-album release
2019	"Tiro Certo" (feat. Gusttavo Lima)	10	Ao Vivo em Goiânia
2019	"Medalha de Prata" (feat. Maiara & Maraisa)	6	Ao Vivo em Goiânia
2020	"Amiga Nada"	–	Non-album release
2020	"Virginia"	–	Non-album release
2020	"Só Tem Eu"	32	Non-album release
2021	"Esquece de Me Esquecer"	–	
2021	"Senta Com Amor"	–	
2021	"Tranquilita"	–	
2021	"Senta Danada"	–	

Promotional singles

Year	Single	Peak positions	Album
Year	Single	BRA	Album
2016	"Deixa que Ela Decide" (feat. Pedro Paulo & Alex)		Proibido é Mais Gostoso
2017	"Na Mesma Estrada" (feat. Leonardo)		Na Mesma Estrada
2017	"Cabocla" (feat. Leonardo)		Na Mesma Estrada

=== Featured in ===
Year	Single	Peak positions	Album
Year	Single	BRA	Album
2017	"Súbeme la Radio (Remix)" (Enrique Iglesias feat. Descemer Bueno, Anselmo Ralph, Zé Felipe & Ender Thomas))		Non-album release
2018	"Tijolinho por Tijolinho" (Enzo Rabelo feat. Zé Felipe)		Non-album release
2018	"Se Vira Aí" (Joelma feat. Zé Felipe)		Non-album release
2019	"Troquei de Mina" (Dan Lellis feat. Zé Felipe)		Non-album release

=== Other appearances ===
Year	Single	Peak positions	Album
Year	Single	BRA	Album
2014	"Deixaria Tudo" / "Te Amo Demais" / "Coração Espinhado" (medley) (Leonardo feat. Zé Felipe)		Leonardo – 30 Anos
2015	"Amor é Diferente" (Paula Mattos feat. Zé Felipe)		Acústico
2015	"Pra Não Perder os Contatos" (Zé Ricardo & Thiago feat. Zé Felipe)		Onde Tudo Começou
2016	"Tan Fácil" (CNCO & Zé Felipe)		Primera Cita
2017	"Temperatura" (Pedro & Benício feat. Zé Felipe)		Hipnose Ao Vivo (Ao Vivo) (live)
