= Astorga, Paraná =

Municipality in the state of Paraná in Brazil

Coordinates: 23°13′58″S 51°39′57″W

- Municipality
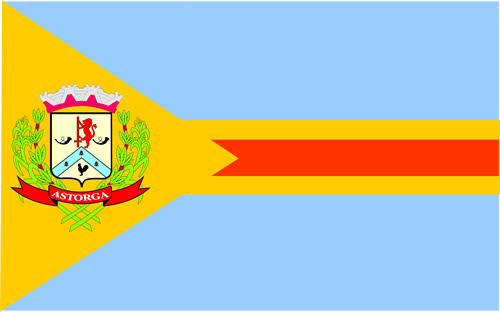
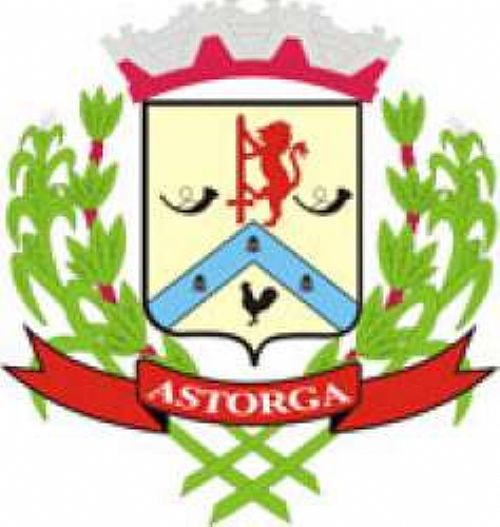
- Flag Coat of arms
- Interactive map of Astorga, Paraná
- Country: Brazil
- Time zone: UTC−3 (BRT)

Astorga is a municipality in the state of Paraná in Brazil. It was founded in 1951. As of 2020, the estimated population was 26,209 inhabitants.
