= Rezendeevil =

Brazilian YouTuber

rezendeevil
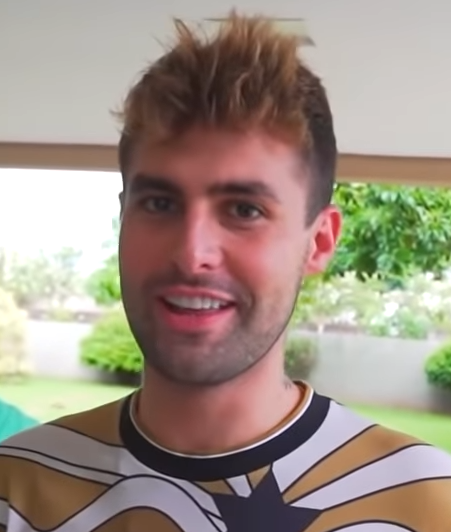
- Rezende in January 2022
- Born: Pedro Afonso Rezende Posso; 24 August 1996 (age 30); Londrina, Paraná, Brazil
- Occupations: YouTuber; actor

YouTube information
- Channel: rezendeevil
- Years active: 2012–present
- Genres: Vlogs; gaming; comedy
- Subscribers: 33.4 million
- Views: 13.4 billion
- Last updated: 30 May 2024

Pedro Afonso Rezende Posso (born 24 August 1996), known online as rezendeevil, is a Brazilian YouTuber known for his Minecraft videos and vlogs. His channel has approximately 30 million subscribers, making it the 7th most-subscribed channel from Brazil.

Before becoming a full-time YouTuber, he played association football.

In 2015, he co-authored a book with his father titled Dois Mundos, Um Herói.

== Early life ==
Pedro was born in Londrina in Parana in 1996, where he lives today. In 2012, at the age of 16, he left Brazil and moved to Italy to pursue his dream of becoming a football player and was hired by the Italian professional futsal team "Real Rietti" and started playing as a goalkeeper. When he left for Italy, he had just created his YouTube channel, named "RezendeEvil", a mix of his last name with the title of his favorite Resident Evil game. He suffered humiliation at hands of the team's players, who did not accept the Brazilian's presence, making him go through humiliating situations. As the interaction with the players became unsustainable, he decided to end his seven-month season in the team and returned to Brazil.

== Career ==
Returning to his country, he invested the money he earned in a better computer, became a professional YouTuber and started publishing three videos a day on his channel, all related to the game Minecraft. In a short time, his channel began to grow, receiving millions of views on his videos, making Pedro become one of the biggest YouTubers in the country. In 2015, he launched himself as a writer by releasing his first book Two Worlds, One Hero. In 2016, he released his second and third books "Back to the Game " and "Final Play ". In 2017, he was elected by the British magazine Forbes as one of the 91 most influential young people in the world.

== See also ==
- List of YouTubers
