= Adultification =

Form of racial prejudice

In psychology and sociology, adultification refers to the treatment of some children by adults as being more mature than they actually are—such as when they are expected to take on age-inappropriate adult roles and responsibilities as children, and when they are taken to be as culpable as adults for any crime or wrongdoing.

In the United States, it is often used to refer to a form of racial bias, whereby Black American children are assumed to be more culpable, and punished more harshly than White American children, for the same offences. Many studies have found that Black children are more likely to receive discipline from authority figures, such as police officers and teachers. Black children are also overlooked or their intentions are misrepresented in healthcare settings, contributing to "medical mistrust" in the Black community. Scholars from the Georgetown Law Center on Poverty and Law have argued that adultification bias can trace its roots to slavery and stereotypes of African Americans. Adultification bias can affect the language used when describing children or adolescences of minority groups in the media. This bias may perpetuate the school-to-prison pipeline.

Educators and authority figures can address adultification bias by improving their cultural competence and communication.

== History ==
Adultification was originally a psychology term describing children who act more mature than their peers as a result of being handed adult responsibilities from a young age. This adultification is often forced by circumstances outside of the Black youth's control. Maturity usually comes with increased autonomy, Black children are frequently denied this right while still facing the expectations of others.

=== Slavery in the United States ===
Many Black children were treated like adults during slavery. Treatment of enslaved children varied throughout the United States. Some plantations would not assign jobs to children until they became adolescents. Others put Black children to work as early as two to three years old. Slave owners would then decide when enslaved children made the transition from doing light chores to working hard-labor jobs assigned to adults. Typically, this transition occurred by the time they were eight to nine. Adultification also occurred due to hyper-sexualization of Black children by slave owners.

=== Media representation ===
Although White adolescence is frequently pictured through films, Black adolescence is not commonly portrayed. This lack of media representation contributes to the ignorance surrounding Black youth and their struggles with forced adultification. The aging of Black youth prevents them from having the same privileges as White youth.

The journalist Arwa Mahdawi has identified adultification by CNN and Sky News in the coverage of deaths of children in the Gaza war.

== Consequences ==
=== Education ===
Black students may face hypercriticism from authority figures, especially while in school. Teachers can perceive Black girls as being loud or "sassy" compared to white girls and punish them over being "unladylike". Teachers are less likely to help Black students when they need help in school since they are assumed to be delinquents and incapable of success. Because of their perceived maturity, Black children are seen as less in need of access to mentorship and leadership opportunities. Black children are treated to "know better" by teachers and are not seen as having one of the main characteristics of childhood: innocence. Black students may also be penalized more over mistakes on schoolwork.

Black girls are more likely to be disciplined in school than white girls for subjective infractions including, but not limited to dress code violations, fighting, loitering, and harassment. They are more susceptible to verbal and physical violence by authority figures in schools. The United States Department of Education found that Black girls are six times more likely to be suspended than white girls. Not only are Black girls found to have high rate of discipline in school over white girls, they tend to have higher rates than boys belonging to other racial/ethnic groups, further highlighting this bias in Black students.

Some schools, however, do have Black and other minority boys consistently being disciplined over other groups of children. Black boys are three times more likely than other students to be suspended from school. Overall, black boys have the highest suspension and drop out rates from both elementary and high school. According to the National Center for Education Statistics, the largest group with out-of-school suspensions from public schools is black boys, accounting for 17.6 percent of suspensions from 2013 to 2014. From that same study, they found that Black girls account for the second largest percentage of out-of-school suspensions at 9.6 percent.

During the 1980s and 1990s, more schools started to rely on policies like drug-sniffing dogs and armed police officers in response to student misbehavior. Some say that these policies may actually exacerbate anti-Blackness through school policies such as these because they create environments in which Black girls learn their feelings do not matter and that they will not receive the benefit of the doubt over misbehavior. Some of the students can tell when these teachers treat Black students differently from white students and are left isolated from students and teachers because of this treatment. When Black children speak up over the bias, they are seen as "talking back" or being too assertive rather than expressing their concerns and usually receive some type of disciplinary action. Witnessing the harsh discipline of these students in schools can desensitize others to situations when Black students are given worse punishments.

=== Justice system ===
Between 1985 and 1997, the number of Black girls in the juvenile justice system was growing at a rate higher than any other population. Black girls are 2.7 times more likely to be referred to juvenile justice over white girls, and young Black girls are 1.2 times more likely to be detained by the police.

Adultification bias may contribute to the school-to-prison pipeline by having Black children punished in schools and increasing their chances of being placed in prison or wrongfully imprisoned. Students that have been suspended are three times more likely to drop out of school and those who drop out are three times more likely to be incarcerated. Black youth are three times more likely than White youth to be put in residential placement. A study showed that participants viewed Black juveniles as more similar to adults than to White juveniles when blamed for a crime. This can impact teens being detained as being treated like adults, despite the precedent that shows that juveniles are less culpable than adult offenders.

=== Healthcare ===
Black teens are often tested for sexually transmitted diseases when presenting with abdominal symptoms despite reporting no sexual activity due to the assumption of Black promiscuity. A 2020 study found that Black youth were less likely to be promptly diagnosed and treated for appendicitis, revealing implicit and structural racial bias in hospitals.

== Academic study ==
A 2017 study on Black girls by the Georgetown Center on Gender Justice & Opportunity includes one of the first studies of "adultification bias", showing that adults perceive Black girls as more adult-like than their white peers. That study followed a 2014 study by Philip Goff on Black boys, showing that Black boys are viewed as older and more culpable for crimes than white boys of the same age.

== In Brazil ==
In Brazil, the phenomenon also manifests itself in the form of racial bias and early hypersexualization embedded in the broader context of structural racism. Data from the "Violence against women" platform indicate that, between 2011 and 2017, more than 45% of sexual abuse cases registered in the country involved black girls aged 0 to 9, a percentage more than 7% higher than that observed among white girls in the same period.

In 2021, Brazilian influencer Felipe Neto warned about a trend on TikTok where children dance to erotic lyrics, in 2019, he accused YouTube of facilitating pedophiles. In 2024, actress and presenter Antônia Fontenelle published a video denouncing influencer Hytalo Santos, who gained notoriety for producing videos in a format similar to reality shows, filmed in houses or mansions where children and teenagers shared their routines, for exploitation and sexualization of minors, and was the subject of a court decision that ordered the immediate removal of the content published by her and imposed a daily fine in case of non-compliance.

== In the United Kingdom ==
Adultification bias has been raised as an issue in the treatment of Black children in the UK. It has been described as a "systemic" issue, and has been a factor in cases where children have been treated as criminals, or where sexual abuse of children has not been recognised. In 2024, the Independent Office for Police Conduct issued guidelines intending to prevent it, but Black Lives Matter UK said that the guidelines would not make enough difference.

== See also ==
- Parentification – Process of role reversal in the parent-child relation
- School-to-prison pipeline – Tendency of U.S. adolescents from disadvantaged backgrounds to become incarcerated
- Stereotypes of African Americans
