= Statute of the Child and Adolescent =

- Citation: Law no. 8,069 of 13 July 1990
- Territorial extent: Whole of Brazil
- Signed by: President Fernando Collor de Mello
- Signed: 13 July 1990
- Commenced: 13 July 1990

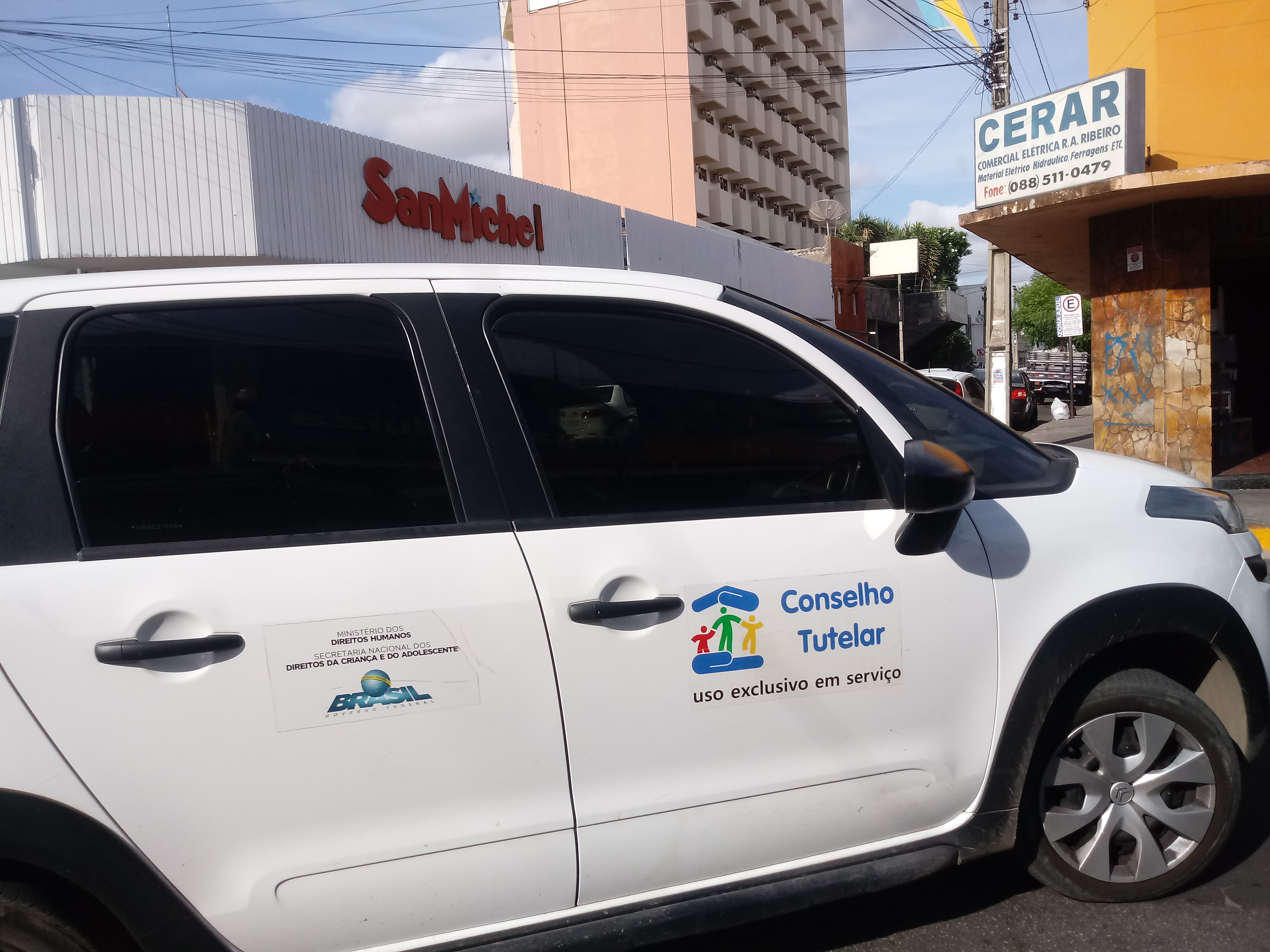
A car from the Tutelary Council, a body created by the ECA responsible for ensuring the fulfillment of the rights of children and adolescents.

The Statute of the Child and Adolescent (Estatuto da Criança e do Adolescente; ECA; Law no. 8,069 of 13 July 1990) is the Brazilian law aimed at protecting the rights of children and adolescents, applying measures and issuing referrals to the judiciary. It is the legal framework that consolidated the doctrine of integral protection in the country, replacing the former Minor's Code created in 1979, during the military dictatorship, which followed the doctrine of the irregular situation. By establishing children and adolescents as subjects of rights entitled to absolute priority, the Statute represents a paradigm shift in Brazilian legislation.

== History ==
From the Brazilian Empire to the end of the military dictatorship, state policies regarding children and adolescents were characterized by exclusion and institutionalization. During the Imperial period, assistance was primarily provided by Catholic institutions through the roda dos enjeitados ("wheel of foundlings"). The First Brazilian Republic introduced the 1890 Penal Code, which established criminal responsibility from age nine, and the 1927 Mello Mattos Code, the first comprehensive legislation on minors, which combined assistentialist and controlling measures. The Vargas era created the Service for Assistance to Minors in 1941, later replaced during the military regime by the National Policy for the Welfare of Minors and the 1979 Minor's Code. This Code formally adopted the Doctrine of the Irregular Situation, under which children and adolescents from poor families—whether abandoned, neglected, or accused of infractions—could be classified as "irregular" and subjected to internment. The Juvenile Judge exercised broad discretionary powers, often merging judicial, executive, and administrative functions.

The democratic transition of the 1980s led to a fundamental legal transformation. The 1988 Constitution, in Article 227, introduced the Doctrine of Integral Protection, establishing children and adolescents as subjects of rights with absolute priority. This principle was regulated by the Statute of the Child and Adolescent, which replaced the 1979 Minor's Code. The ECA abolished the category of "irregular situation" and extended rights universally to all children and adolescents. It created new institutional mechanisms, including Tutelary Councils and Rights Councils, decentralized policies to municipalities, redefined the role of the Public Prosecutor's Office, and established a socio-educational system for adolescents that respects due process and limits internment to exceptional cases.

Since the enactment of the ECA, its implementation has encountered ongoing challenges. Some institutional practices inherited from prior legal frameworks have persisted, including the issuance of regulatory ordinances by juvenile courts, which at times extend beyond the parameters established by the Statute. Additionally, certain aspects of public discourse and institutional responses continue to reflect concepts associated with the Doctrine of the Irregular Situation, such as the tendency to associate poverty with delinquency. While the ECA introduced a significant legal shift, the pace of change in practices and attitudes has varied across different sectors. The effectiveness of the Statute depends on the continued alignment of institutional procedures with its provisions and the strengthening of protection systems at the local level.

=== Digital Statute of the Children and Adolescent ===
On 17 September 2025, President Luiz Inácio Lula da Silva signed the Law no. 15,211, the Digital Statute of the Children and Adolescent, which came into force on 17 March 2026. The law establishes rules for digital platforms, applications, and games operating in the country, requiring age verification systems, prohibiting loot boxes in games aimed at children and adolescents, and addressing manipulative design. The text also strengthens protection against commercial exploitation, sexual violence, and access to prohibited products, in addition to regulating the activities of child influencers, requiring prior judicial authorization for the monetization of content that exploits the image of children and adolescents.

== See also ==
- Law of Brazil
- Social issues in Brazil
