= MC Marcinho =

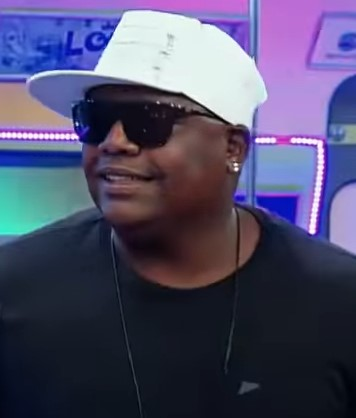
- MC Marcinho in 2019

Background information
- Born: Márcio André Nepomuceno Garcia; 11 November 1977; Duque de Caxias, Rio de Janeiro, Brazil
- Died: 26 August 2023 (aged 45) Rio de Janeiro, Brazil
- Genres: Funk melody; Funk carioca
- Occupations: Singer; composer
- Instrument: vocals
- Years active: 1993–2023
- Labels: Labidad Music, Afegan, Link Records, PA Records, EMI, Furacão 2000

Márcio André Nepomuceno Garcia (11 November 1977 – 26 August 2023), better known as MC Marcinho, was a Brazilian singer and composer of funk melody. He was famous for such hits as "Rap do Solitário", "Princesa", "Glamurosa", "Garota nota 100", and "Tudo é festa". During the height of his career, he was dubbed the "Prince of Funk".

== Early life ==
Márcio André Nepomuceno Garcia was born in the city of Duque de Caxias, Rio de Janeiro, on 11 November 1977. His father was a cabinet maker who performed samba outside of work. At age 6, Marcinho moved to the Bangu neighborhood of the city of Rio de Janeiro. Marcinho had cited as influences Roberto Carlos, Tim Maia, Sandra de Sá, Jorge Ben Jor and Raça Negra.

== Career ==
=== 1997–99: Porque Te Amo, O Sempre Solitário and Valeu Shock ===
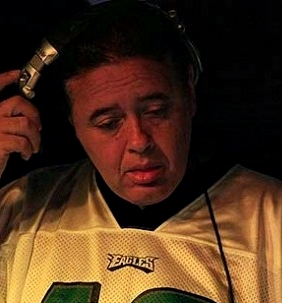
DJ Marlboro (pictured) produced Marcinho's first albums, between 1997 and 1999

Garcia came to be most prominent in the funk carioca genre during the 1990s, with hits such as "Rap do Solitário", "Escrito Pras Princesas", "Garota Nota 100", among others. Before his first complete album, he released the recording of a track with producer DJ Marlboro, partnering with funk musician MC Cacau, with whom he had maintained a relationship with. The album Porque Te Amo was released 1997.

After releasing various singles and an album in collaboration with MC Cacau, in 1998, he released his first album with DJ Marlboro and Afegan Records, Sempre Solitário (Afegan Records). One of the most well-known songs from the album was "Garota Nota 100", which would become part of the soundtrack to the TV Globo novela Vai na Fé. In 1999, despite funk melody having a relatively small share of radio airtime, he released Valeu Shock, his second album with DJ Marlboro. The album produced a hit with "Motivos da Vida".

=== 2000–2011: Last years of musical career ===
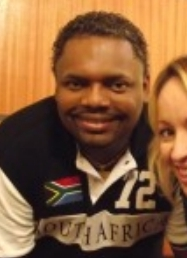
Marcinho in 2015

At the beginning of the 2000s, MC Marcinho began to disappear from the limelight as funk began to prioritize more erotic lyrics, which made his style of music less prominent despite him continuing to work. In 2002, he launched the album Falando com as Estrelas, produced by DJ Grandmaster Raphael with songs such as "Funk das antigas", "Zona Oeste", and "Glamurosa"; the latter of which became a hit after the albums release.

With a more contemporary move at the time, "Glamurosa" began to eventually gain more traction, MC Marcinho began to return more to the funk moderno style that utilizes more drum beats. The song was his greatest success, and was written with presenter Xuxa as inspiration. Between 2006 and 2008, he went on hiatus after a major car accident that resulted in the amputation of one of his legs. He performed at the inaugural edition of Brisa Beach Party in Porto, Portugal in 2007.

In August 2011, he released his first live DVD in partnership with EMI titled "Tudo é Festa". The album, which was recorded at Circo Voador in Rio de Janeiro in 2008, featured guest appearances from musicians such as Flávia Santana, Sandra de Sá, and MC Sapão, among others. After the DVDs release, however, MC Marcinho began to lessen his work schedule as his health issues began to mount, including a bout of pneumonia in 2012.

== Personal life ==
Married Kelly Garcia in 2008. They had two children together, Marcelly and Marcelo. He had also been married to MC Cacau with whom he had a child, Marcio. Marcinho is also the father of Mateus and Sara Paraíso. Sara discovered that he was her father at the age of 21 in 2021 through a paternity test, later confirmed by further DNA testing. In total, he had 5 children. Six days before his death, on 20 August 2023, Garcia had announced that she had divorced Marcinho, who by that point was hospitalized.

=== Health issues and death ===
During the later years of his life, Marcinho had a series of major health issues that eventually resulted in his death. In 2006, he experienced a major car crash, which forced the amputation of his leg, though he recovered as much as he possibly could from the accident. In 2019, he was hospitalized again due to a heart attack. The following year, he was admitted to the ICU after contracting COVID-19. In January 2021, he was hospitalized due to having a downturn in his health, which according to doctors was due to pneumonia. The musician also had been in a coma after a stomach infection, which occurred after he had been shot. In February 2021, he was in a coma for four days after a bacterial infection on his left foot, along with staying in hospital for three months after the infection progressed to his lungs. At the end of July 2021, he had a pacemaker implanted after having cardiac issues. In 2023, he had the pacemaker, along with another pacemaker implanted in 2019, removed after complications began to arise. Marcinho was admitted to Hospital Copa D'Or in Copacabana, where he was sedated and had hemodialysis done. He was diabetic and suffered from both renal and heart failure.

In August 2023, Marcinho's health began to decline as he began to develop multiple organ dysfunction syndrome, and died on 26 August, at the age of 45. He had a public showing at Cemitério da Penitência, in the Caju Cemetery group of necropolises in the Caju neighborhood. The first two hours of the ceremony were open to the public, with the final hour being open only to family and friends. His body was cremated at the cemetery's crematorium, in a ceremony only reserved for family members.

== Discography ==
=== Studio albums ===
- 1997: Porque Te Amo (with MC Cacau)
- 1998: Sempre Solitário
- 1999: Valeu Shock
- 2002: Falando com as Estrelas
- 2003: Ilusão

=== Live albums ===
- 2011: Tudo é Festa

== Filmography ==
=== DVDs ===
- 2011: Tudo é Festa
