= DJK =

DJK may refer to:

- DJK-Sportverband (Deutsche Jugendkraft Sportverband, German Youth Sport Association)
- DJK Würzburg
- DJK Vilzing
- DJK Ammerthal
- DJK Abenberg
- DJK Waldberg
- DJK Germania Gladbeck
- DJK Don Bosco Bamberg
- DJK Agon 08 Düsseldorf
- Jutland Art Academy (Danish: Det Jyske Kunstakademi), Denmark

== People ==
- Derrell Johnson-Koulianos (born 1987), a former American football player
- D. J. Kennington (born 1977), a Canadian professional stock car racing driver
- DJ K (born 2000 or 2001), a Brazilian funk producer
