= Income inequality in Brazil =

Brazil has high income inequality despite high rates of economic growth. The country's richest 1% of the population (less than 2 million Brazilians) have 13% of all household income, a similar economic result to that of the poorest 50% (about 80 million Brazilians). This inequality results in poverty levels that are inconsistent with an economy the size of that of Brazil. The country's GDP growth in 2010 was 7.5%. In recent decades, there has been a modest decline in inequality for the country as a whole. Brazil's GINI coefficient, a measure of income inequality, has slowly decreased from 0.596 in 2001 to 0.543 in 2009. However, the numbers still point to a rather significant problem of income disparity.

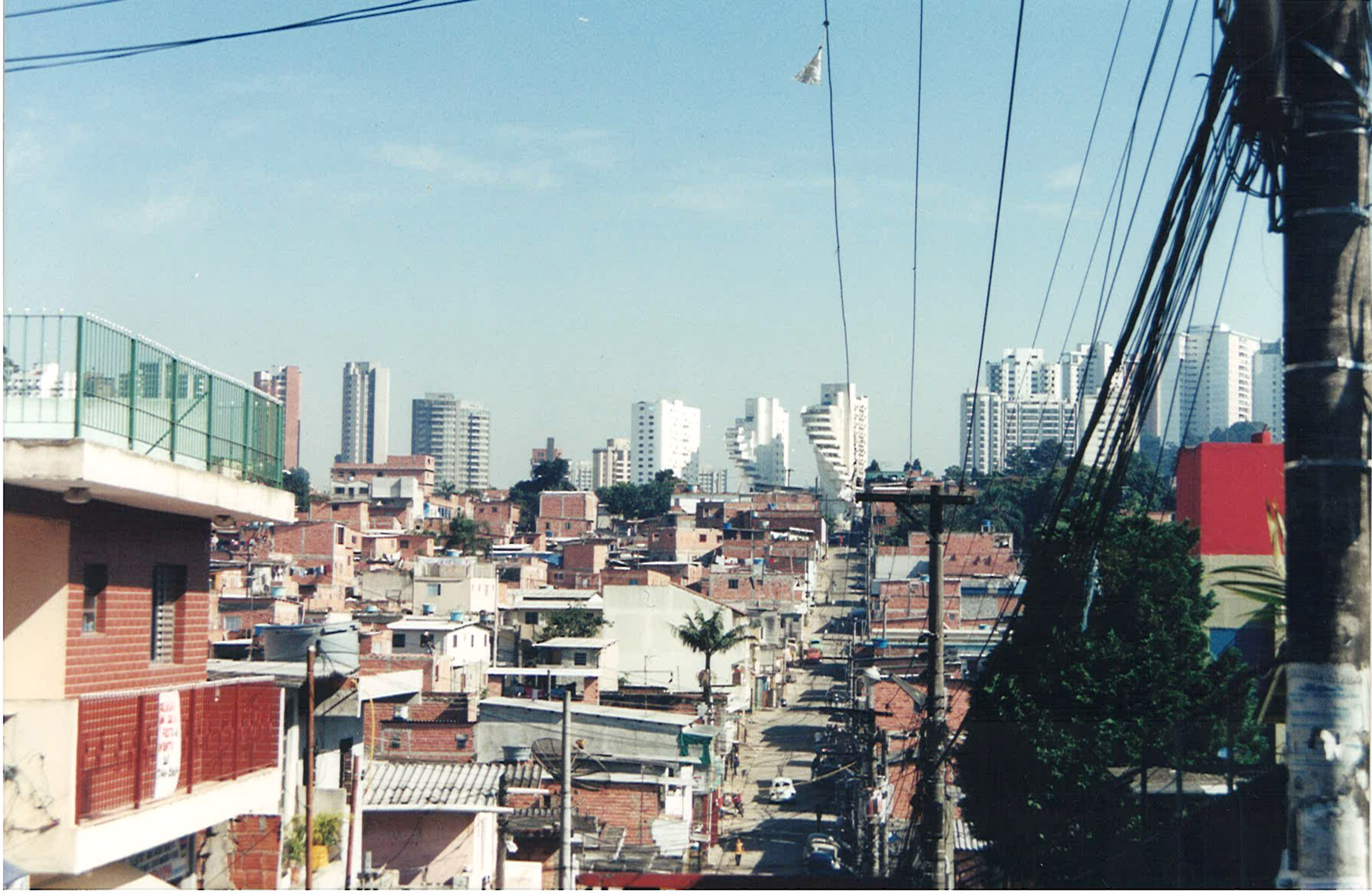
View of Condomínio Penthouse from Paraisópolis, São Paulo, a notable symbol of income inequality in Brazil.

== Contributing factors ==
=== Rural/urban divide ===
Varying levels of economic development exists in urban and rural areas. Those living in the rural communities face a lack of proper education, healthcare and infrastructure. The lack of access to technology, formal education and skills training have resulted in fewer employment opportunities, and hence contribute to lower revenues of people living in rural areas.

=== Low levels of education ===
The low level of education in Brazil in general has been a concern as it perpetuates the income inequality situation by decreasing social mobility. This limits the opportunities of those in low income groups, lowering their chances of narrowing the income gap. Brazil has an illiteracy rate of 10.2% and a poor quality of education. Data from the PISA program of the Organization for Economic Cooperation and Development (OECD) reveals that Brazil ranks far behind other nations in terms of learning in various knowledge areas majority of their students reaching only lowest learning levels in the disciplines.

=== Taxation ===
Brazil's heavy taxes built into consumer prices include high taxes on foods, which burdens the poor. The tax load of those in the higher income brackets earning more than 30 times the minimum wage a month amounted to 26.3 per cent. In contrast, those with a monthly income of less than twice the minimum wage were taxed almost twice the amount at 48.8 percent.

=== High land ownership concentration ===
The expansion of an export- driven agribusiness has led to land ownership concentration (IBGE census reports a GINI index of 0.872). The government implemented an agrarian reform that has resettled many family farms, which employ about 74% of agricultural workers. However, land ownership concentration was reported to be high even in areas where family farms are settled. This is an issue with regard to income inequality as family farms find it hard to compete with large-scale producers and large, centralized land.

== See also ==
- Race in Brazil
