= Eu Só Quero Ser Livre =

Studio album by Perlla
- Released: June 1, 2006
- Recorded: 2006
- Genre: Pop; Dance; R&B; Funk melody
- Label: Deckdisc
- Producer: Umberto Tavares; Mãozinha DJ; DJ Marlboro

Perlla chronology
Eu Só Quero Ser Livre (2006)	Mais Perto (2007)

Eu Só Quero Ser Livre (I Just Want to Be Free) is the debut album, released in 2006, from Brazilian singer Perlla. It was popular in Brazil.

== Track listing ==
1. "Eu Vou" (I go)
2. "Tremendo Vacilão" (Tremendous Vacillator)
3. "Totalmente Demais" (Totally Awesome)
4. "Estórias de Caô" (Stories of Lie)
5. "Já Não Somos Mais Livres" (Already We Are No More Free)
6. "Cansado" (Tired)
7. "Pára de se Iludir" (Stop To Illude Yourself)
8. "Beijo Bom" (Good Kiss)
9. "Groove Dance"
10. "Depois do Amor" (After Love)
11. "Tudo Bem" (Everything Well)
12. "Males" (Bads)
13. "Eu Vou" (Extended)
14. "Groove Dance" (extended)

== Singles ==
- Totalmente Demais - 2006
- Tremendo Vacilão - 2006
- Eu Vou - 2007
