= List of Warner Music Group labels =

Warner Music Group (WMG) owns, has a joint share, or is associated with the record labels listed here.

== Flagship labels ==
- Atlantic Records
- Elektra Records
- Parlophone Records
- Warner Records

== Atlantic Music Group ==
- 1st & 15th Entertainment
- All Money In
- Artist Partner Group
- Asylum Records
- Atlantic Records
- Atco Records
- Avang Music
- Big Beat Records
- Big Tree Records
- Boulevard Boyz
- Bread Winners' Association
- Canvasback Music
- Cat Records
- Guwop Enterprises
- 808 Mafia Records (joint venture with 808 Music Group & Boominati Worldwide
- CBE
- Chop Shop Records
- Taylor Gang Entertainment (joint with Empire Distribution, for JR Donarto & Berner respectively)
- Tha Mvmnt
- Sniper Gang Records
- Chopper City Records
- Cotillion Records
- CTE World
- Custard Records
- Eardrum Records
- Esperanza Records
- First Priority Music
- Fort Knocks Entertainment
- Full Surface Records
- F-Stop Music
- FNC Entertainment
- Grind Or Die Label
- Human Re Sources
- Heavy Muscle, LLC
- LaSalle Records
- Little David Records
- Luke Records
- Nice Life Recording Company
- Owsla
- Nest
- Photo Finish Records
- Poe Boy Music Group
- Rebel Rock Entertainment
- Sandlot Records
- Spinnin' Records
  - Congo Records
  - CONTROVERSIA
  - Dharma Worldwide
  - DOORN Records
  - Heartfeldt Records
  - Hysteria
  - Kryteria Records
  - Maxximize Records
  - Mentalo Music
  - Musical Freedom Records/AFTR:HRS
  - Night Service Only
  - OZ Records
  - SOURCE
  - SINPHONY
  - Spinnin' Deep
  - Spinnin' NEXT
  - Spinnin' Premium
  - Spinnin' Records Asia
  - Spinnin' Talent Pool
  - SPRS
  - Tonco Tone
  - Wall Recordings
- Stone Flower Records
- TAG Recordings
- Top Stop Music
- UpFront Records
- Vortex Records
- X5 Music Group
- Cake Jamz Records
- 300 Entertainment
- Elektra Records
- Asylum Records (back catalog)
- EastWest Records America (back catalog)
- Black Cement
- DCD2 Records
- DTA Records
- Fueled by Ramen
- Low Country Sound
- Roadrunner Records
- Public Consumption Recording Co.

== Warner Records ==
- 12Tone Music Group
- 143 Records
- A&E Records (formerly Mushroom Records UK)
- Action Theory Records
- Artery Recordings
- Beluga Heights
- BME Recordings
- Defiant Records
- Doghouse Records
- Facultad de Némea (San José del Rincón, Mexico)
- Festival Mushroom Records (includes Mushroom/Festival back catalogs)
- Globetown Music
- Helium 3
- Ice Age Entertainment
- Jet Life Recordings
- Loveway Records
- One Town Media
- Machine Shop Recordings
- Malpaso Records
- Maverick Records
- Nonesuch Records
- Slash Records
- Parlophone
- Perezcious Music
- Perfecto Records
- Playmaker Music
- Public Broadcasting Service
- Reprise Records
- RuffNation Records
- Sire Records
- SM Entertainment (Aespa (Korean releases only))
- Red Weather Records (Orlando, Florida)
- Stateside Records
- Top Rank Records (reissues)

== Parlophone Records Ltd. ==
- Parlophone Records, including reissues from the back catalogs of:
  - Chrysalis Records (UK, part)
  - EMI Columbia Records
  - EMI Records (UK)
  - Harvest Records (UK)
  - Regal Recordings
  - Regal Zonophone
  - Virgin Records (Europe only)
- FFRR Records
- Kling Klang Produkt
- Marv Music (joint-venture with film production company Marv Studios)
- Stateside Records (British distribution only)
  - Top Rank Records

== Rhino Entertainment ==
- Atco Records
- Bearsville Records
- Del-Fi Records
- Eleven: A Music Company
- Jubilee Records
- Rhino Records
- Roulette Records
- TK Records

Rhino handles the American distribution of reissues from the UK back catalogs of Chrysalis (part), EMI Columbia, EMI, Harvest, and Parlophone.

== Alternative Distribution Alliance ==
- 10K Projects
- 3CG Records
- 5 Minute Walk
- 679 Recordings
- Acony Records
- Adrenaline Music
- Alligator Records
- Alma Records
- Alta Note Records
- Anzic Records
- Artist First
- Arhoolie Records
- Avitone Records
- Bar/None Records
- Barsuk Records
- Beggars Group
- Bieler Bros. Records
- Blind Pig Records
- Bloodshot Records
- Blix Street Records
- Blisslife Records
- Blue Corn Music
- Blue Horizon
- Bolero Records
- Born & Bred Records
- Brash Records
- Breakbeat Science Records
- Bright Antenna
- Canyon Records
- Carpark Records
- Cavity Search Records
- CDBaby
- Chesky Records
- Chime Entertainment
- Chiyun Records
- Chrysalis Records (as BMG Chrysalis since 2017)
- Comedy Central Records
- Compass Records
- Cordless Recordings
- Courgette Records
- Crunchy Frog Records
- Curb Records
- David Lynch Music Company
- Dcide Records
- Decaydance Records
- Dentro Recordings
- DimeRock Records
- Divendy Records
- Domino Recording Company
- Downtown Records
- Dualtone Records
- East West Records
- Eco Records
- el Music Group
- Everfine Records
- Eyeball Records
- Ferret Music
- Kontor Records
- Funzalo Records
- Guelmi Music
- Hellcat Records
- I Scream Records
- Igualdade Vision Records
- Internet Money
- InVogue Records
- Jemp Records
- Lightyear Entertainment
- Mascom Records
- Masquerade Recordings
- Macklemore Inc.
- Matador Records
- Mayhem Records
- Manifesto Records
- Merge Records
- Metade Note Records
- Milan Records
- Misfits Records
- Metropolis Records
- Music Branding
- Mute Records (US only; except for Depeche Mode)
- Napalm Records
- Born & Bred Records
- Nervous Records
- Nettwerk
- Nexchapter
- No Filter Records
- Nuclear Blast
- Nudgie Records
- Om Records
- Phony Records
- Polyvinyl Record Company
- Projekt Records
- PRT Records
- Pye Records
- Punahele Records
- Relapse Records
- Restless Records
- Rhymesayers Entertainment
- Rhythmbank Entertainment
- Rise Records
- Rock Ridge Music
- Rykodisc Records
- Saddle Creek Records
- Sanctuary Records
- Bronze Records
- Castle Records
- CMC International
- GWR Records
- Sideonedummy Records
- Skeleton Crew
- Slugfest Records
- Stony Plain Records
- Strictly Rhythm Records
- Sub Pop Records
- Surfdog Records
- Tee Pee Records
- Teleprompt Records
- The Control Group
- Thirsty Ear Recordings
- Thrill Jockey Records
- TML Entertainment
- Tommy Boy Entertainment
- Touch & Go Records
- Troubleman Unlimited
- Twenty Two Recordings
- Ubiquity Records
- Upstream Records
- Vice Records
- VMG Recordings
- Voltra Music Group
- Warcon Enterprises
- WaterTower Music
- Wichita Records
- Word Entertainment
- DaySpring Records
- Myrrh Records
- Word Records
- You Entertainment

== Arts Music ==
- Sesame Street Records
- First Night Records
- Mattel Music
- Sh-K-Boom Records

== Warner Classics ==
- Warner Classics Records (incorporating EMI Classics and Angel Records)
- Erato Records (incorporating Virgin Classics)
- Teldec Records
- Elektra Nonesuch Records
- Finlandia Records
- Lontano Records
- Warner Apex
- Warner Elatus
- Warner Fonit Records
- NVC Arts Records

== Warner Music Nashville ==
- Atlantic Records Nashville
- Warner Records Nashville
- Elektra Records Nashville
- Marcus Music

== International labels ==
=== Warner Music International ===
Warner Music International (formerly WEA International) is the international copyright holder and distributor for North American artists on the Warner Music record labels. An example of this is on the credits for the American artists albums which states i.e. "Warner Bros. Records, Inc. for the U.S. and WEA International, Inc. for the world outside the U.S."

WEA is also referred to as Warner Music International or Warner Music Entertainment and has divisions worldwide such as Australia, Japan and all over Europe. These branches are usually called Warner Music followed by the name of the country. Some labels have more than one record company for example the UK has Warner Bros. Records UK and Atlantic Records UK but both trade through Warner Music UK, Limited. These labels market and distribute artists in those specific regions are all part of WEA International/Warner Music International

==== Europe ====
- Balkan Electro
- Spinnin' Records (acquired in 2017)

===== As Warner Music =====
- Warner Music HK
- Teldec
- Warner Music UK
  - Warner Records UK (formally WEA Records UK Ltd.)
  - Voltra Music Group
  - East West Records
  - Atlantic Records UK
  - Asylum Records UK
  - Rhino UK - new division of Warner Music UK, formed in 2010 for reissues and compilation.
  - A&E Records (formerly the independent label Mushroom Records UK)
  - London Records (originally the U.S. label for Decca)
  - 679 Recordings
  - 14th Floor Records
- Warner Music Sweden
  - Mariann Grammofon AB
  - Parlophone Music Sweden (formerly EMI Music Sweden AB)
  - X5 Music Group
- Warner Music Spain
- Warner Music Portugal
  - Parlophone Portugal (acquisition; formerly EMI-Valentim de Carvalho)
- Warner Music Poland
  - EMI Music Poland (defunct; formerly Pomaton-EMI)
  - Polskie Nagrania
- Warner Music Norway
  - K. Dahl Eftf.
- Warner Music Benelux
  - Atlantic Records Benelux
  - Warner Music Belgium
    - Parlophone Music Belgium (Formerly EMI Music Belgium)
    - Antler-Subway Records
  - Warner Music Netherlands
- Warner Music Central Europe
  - Atlantic Records Germany
  - Warner Music Austria
  - Warner Music Germany
  - Warner Music Hungary (Magneoton)
  - Warner Music Switzerland
  - UDR Records
- Warner Music Italy
  - ADA Italy
  - Warner Records Italy
  - Atlantic Records Italy
- Warner Music Ireland
- Warner Music Greece
- Warner Music France (formerly WEA Filipacchi Music)
  - ADA France
  - Parlophone France
    - Delabel
    - Virgin Music France
      - Virgin Classics
  - Décibels Productions
  - Elektra France
  - Atlantic Records France
  - Nous Productions (acquired in 2016)
- Warner Music Finland
  - Finnlevy (acquisition)
  - Fazer Records
  - Evidence
  - Helsinki Music Company (HMC)
- Warner Music Baltics
- Warner Music Denmark
  - Medley
- Warner Music Czech Republic
- 1967 Ltd
  - Must Destroy Records (distribution)
  - The Beats (labels deal)
  - Warner Strategic Marketing (warner.esp)
- Warner Music Romania
  - Roton (until 2020)
  - Global Records (since 2020)

==== Africa ====
- Warner Music Africa (formerly Warner Music South Africa)

==== Australia/Oceania ====
- Warner Music Australia
- Warner Music New Zealand
- Illegal Musik

==== Asia ====
- Gold Typhoon
- Warner Music China
- Warner Music Hong Kong
  - F Records
  - Whet Drops
- Warner Music India
  - Maati
  - Sky Digital (distribution)
  - Always Music Global
  - Indie Music Label (distribution)
  - Desh Music
  - Divo
  - 91 NORTH RECORDS
- Warner Music Indonesia
  - Hemagita Records (acquisition)
  - Virgo Ramayana (distribution)
  - Alfa Records (former with Universal Music Group)
  - Indo Semar Sakti (Believe Music)
- Warner Music Japan (ワーナーミュージック・ジャパン)
  - A.K.A. Records
  - A'zip Music
  - Atlantic Records Japan
  - Cube Loves Music! (joint venture with Nissan Motors)
  - Defstar Records (1997–2000, now a sublabel of Sony Music Japan)
  - Dream Machine
  - East West Records Japan (formerly MMG Records)
  - Entrance
  - Fueled By Mentaiko (Joint venture with WACK)
  - Futurista
  - Garland
  - Jupiter
  - Minami
  - Moon
  - N.A.T.
  - No Label Music (2023–2025, now a sublabel of Sony Music Labels)
  - Organon
  - Pasion Record!
  - Photon
  - Planets
  - Real Note
  - River Way (defunct after Makihara left Warner)
  - Reprise Records Japan
  - Rhino Records Japan
  - Roadrunner Records Japan
  - Samurai Rock
  - Sprouse
  - Taco Records
  - Trinitas
  - Unborde
  - Vybe
  - Warner Sunset
  - WEA Japan
  - World Art
- Warner Music Korea
  - Brand New Music (co-distributed with Kakao Entertainment)
  - Keystone Entertainment
  - MPLIFY Records
  - UNCUTPOINT
    - The Dial Music
    - Laundry Office
    - MKIT RAIN
  - Vitamin Entertainment (acquired in 2007)
  - WS Entertainment (joint venture with the SK Group and LOEN Entertainment, now defunct)
- Warner Music Malaysia
  - Ramada Records (Dangdut record label, now defunct)
  - Black Hat Cat Records
  - Zamrud (Nasyid music label)
  - Roslan Aziz Productions
- Warner Music Middle East
- Warner Music Philippines
  - Music Colony Records
  - PressPlay.ph
  - Sora Music Group
  - Universal Records (1977-1992)
  - Maati
- Warner Music Pakistan
  - Giraffe Music
- Warner Music Singapore
  - Music Street (acquired in 2005)
  - Play Music (acquired in 2005)
- Warner Music Taiwan (華納唱片)
  - UFO Records (acquisition)
- Warner Music Thailand
  - D-Day (acquisition)
  - Muser (acquisition)
  - Wayfer Record (acquisition in 2013)
  - Onpa Music (co-distributed)
- Warner Music Turkey
- Warner Music Vietnam
  - SpaceSpeakers

==== South America ====
- Warner Music Argentina
- Warner Music Brasil
  - Banguela Records (defunct)
  - Caravela Records
  - EH Brasil
  - Furacão 2000
  - Selo Chantecler
  - Selo Continental
  - East West Records
  - WEA Discos
  - RW Produtora
  - Warner Strategic Marketing Brazil
- Warner Music Chile
- Warner Music Colombia
- Warner Music Mexico
- Warner Music Perú

=== North America ===
- Warner Music Canada
- Warner Music Group

== Defunct/dormant labels ==
- Ferret Music
- Pink Floyd Records (UK and Europe distribution only; extinct after Pink Floyd's catalogue was fully acquired by Sony Music in 2024)
- Up Music
- Vortex Records
- Warner Music Israel
- Warner Music Russia
  - Atlantic Records Russia
