= Playmaker (disambiguation) =

Playmaker is a designation assigned to some association football midfielders and forwards.

Playmaker or playmakers may also refer to:

== In sports ==
- Playmaker (basketball), an alternate term for the point guard position in basketball or handball
- PlayMaker Football, a 1989 video game for the Macintosh operating system
- "The Playmaker", a self-assigned nickname of retired American football player Michael Irvin
- "Playmaker", an overdrive neckbreaker in professional wrestling

== In arts and popular culture ==
- Playmaker (1994 film), a drama/mystery/thriller film
- Playmaker (2018 film), a German action drama film
- Playmakers, a 2003 ESPN television show
- Playmaker Media, an Australian television production company
- PlayMakers Repertory Company, a theater company at the University of North Carolina at Chapel Hill
- Playmakers Theatre, a building at the University of North Carolina at Chapel Hill
- The Playmaker (album), a 2016 album by Phyno
- The Playmaker (novel), a 1987 novel by Thomas Keneally
- Playmaker Music, a record label
- Playmaker, the alias of Yusaku Fujiki in the anime series Yu-Gi-Oh! VRAINS
