= Prêmio Jovem Brasileiro 2026 =

2026 award ceremony

2026 Prêmio Jovem Brasileiro
- Date: September 22, 2026
- Location: Áudio; São Paulo, Brazil
- Hosted by: Guto Melo
- Website: Official website

Television/radio coverage
- Network: RecordPlus; YouTube
- Produced by: Agência Zapping

The Prêmio Jovem Brasileiro 2026 was the 25th edition of the Prêmio Jovem Brasileiro, a Brazilian awards ceremony focused on artists, influencers, content creators and entertainment personalities. The ceremony took place on September 22, 2026, at Áudio in São Paulo, Brazil. The 2026 edition featured 34 categories, with five finalists in each category. The ceremony was broadcast on the RecordPlus streaming service and on YouTube. Guto Melo hosted the ceremony.

== Performances ==
Melody was announced as the opening performer of the 2026 Prêmio Jovem Brasileiro and performed "Pipoco", "Jet Ski", "Love, Love" and "Assalto Perigoso".

List of performers at the Prêmio Jovem Brasileiro 2026
Artist(s)	Song(s)
Melody	"Pipoco" "Jet Ski" "Love, Love" "Assalto Perigoso"
Mariana Fagundes	"Peão Todo Tatuado"
Jeninho	
MC Pedrinho	
Bruna Lipiani	
Enzo Ferro	
Vanessa Lopes	"Sequência"
Muri	
Bruno Rosa	
Flay	
Atitude 67	

== Winners and nominees ==
The nominations for the 2026 edition were presented with five finalists in each category. Winners are listed first and highlighted in bold.

Hit of the Year	Bombastic Music Video
**"Jetski" — Pedro Sampaio, Melody and MC Meno K**; "Carnaval" — Marina Sena; "Gostosin" — Anitta, Hitmaker and Felipe Amorim; "Olha Onde Eu Tô" — Ana Castela; "Peão Todo Tatuado" — Mariana Fagundes and Jeninho	**"Dark Temptation" — Lorena Simpson and Wanessa**; "Desgraça" — Anitta; "Protagonista" — Renata Schneider; "Se Sentir Saudade" — MC Pedrinho and MC Livinho; "Tatuagem" — Diego Martins, Pocah and MC GW
Best Collaboration	Diversity and Inclusion
**"Peão Todo Tatuado" — Mariana Fagundes and Jeninho**; "Atriz Demais" — Bruno Rosa and Murilo Huff; "Jetski" — Pedro Sampaio, Melody and MC Meno K; "O Que Sobrou do Amor?" — Carol Biazin and Leo Foguete; "Só Pra Tu" — Anitta and Viviane Batidão	**Patixa**; Daniel 220V; Laurinha Costa; Lorenzo Mello; Mario Netto
Youth of the Future	Best Podcast
**Mel Summers**; **Lorenzo Mello**; Daniel 220V; Laurinha Costa; Mario Netto	**Link Podcast**; Flow Podcast; PodC Mais; PodCats; PodDelas
Brazil's Most Stylish Young Person	Best Fandom in Brazil
**Gkay**; **JP Mota**; Beatriz Reis; João Guilherme; Unna X	**Camelos – Camila Loures**; Ballet – Renata Saldanha and Eva Pacheco; Cailu – Caio Cerqueira and Luan Alencar; Loritas – João Ferreira; Luanetes – Luan Santana
Best TikToker	Favorite Channel
**Gabily**; **Juliano Floss**; Edu Becks; Netinho; Rafa Justus	**Dos Rosa**; Aqueles Caras; Cazé TV; Doarda; Nepograma
YouTuber of the Year	My Female Crush
**Camila Loures**; **Tiago Jacomo**; Emilly Vick; Enaldinho; Luluca	**Jordana Morais**; Bruna Griphao; Camila Loures; Mari Menezes; Virginia
My Male Crush	I Ship
**Jonas Sulzbach**; André Lamoglia; Igor Jansen; Vini Sorriso; Zé Felipe	**Renata Saldanha and Maike Allan**; Inhui and Nobru; Key Alves and Bruno Rosa; Sasha Meneghel and João Lucas; Tays Reis and Biel
Best Esports Team	Best Gamer
**LOUD**; Corinthians E-Sports; Flamengo E-Sports; FluxoGG; FURIA E-Sports	**Vitória Mineblox**; **Coringa**; Biel Yoshi; Natasha Panda; Nobru
Mom Influencer	Entertainment Instagram Account
**Nathalia Valente**; Glenda Loures; Key Alves; Rafa Kalimann; Viih Tube	**Lets Gossip**; Alfinetei; Famosando; Portal Léo Dias; Rafa Comentando
Breakthrough Young Talent	Instagram Queen
**Stefany Thais**; **João Victor Gonçalves**; Carol Roberto; Guto Miguel; Pietro Antonelli	**Cela**; Camila Loures; Mari Menezes; Renata Saldanha; Virginia
Instagram King	Best Humor Influencer
**Carlinhos Maia**; Brino; Davi Brito; Leo Foguete; Neymar Jr.	**Álvaro**; **Leuriscleia**; Bomtalvão; Marco Tulio Davi; Tiago Barnabé
Best Beauty and Makeup Influencer	Best Health and Fitness Influencer
**Camila Pudim**; Aila Loures; Inhui Song; Sílvia Braz; Thais Linares	**Camila Loures**; **Thomaz Costa**; Jade Picon; Ramon Dino; Victor Alexandre
Best Reality TV Participant	Best Host
**Ana Paula Renault**; **Dudu Camargo**; Jordana Morais; Juliano Floss; Saory Cardoso	**Patrícia Abravanel**; **Lucas Guimarães**; Adriane Galisteu; Celso Portiolli; Tati Machado
Best Television Program, Soap Opera or Reality Show	Best Actress
**Rancho do Maia**; A Fazenda; Domingo Legal; Eita Lucas!; Programa do João	**Isadora Cruz**; Isabelle Drummond; Larissa Manoela; Letícia Colin; Pietra Quintela
Best Actor	PJB Rising Star
**Felipe Bragança**; André Luiz Frambach; Henrique Camargo; Pedro Novaes; Théo Medon	**Bruna Lipiani**; **Enzo Ferro**; Kauanzinho; Tília; Tom Filho
Band of the Year	Duo of the Year
**Atitude 67**; Fun7; Menos é Mais; Pagode dos Ex; Viralata	**Maiara e Maraisa**; **Hugo e Guilherme**; Cristinas; Pedro Henrique e João Victor; Zé Neto e Cristiano
Best Male Singer	Best Female Singer
**MC Pedrinho**; Gustavo Mioto; Leo Foguete; Luan Santana; Zé Felipe	**Simone Mendes**; Ana Castela; Anitta; Lauana Prado; Marina Sena
