= Perlla =

Brazilian recording artist, singer

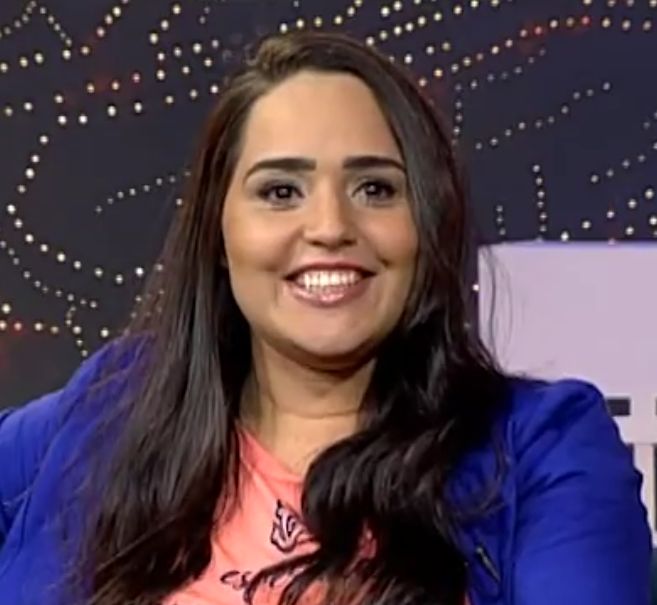
- In a 2017 interview

Background information
- Born: Perla Fernandes dos Santos; November 28, 1988 (age 37)
- Origin: Nilópolis, Rio de Janeiro, Brazil
- Genres: Pop; gospel; funk melody
- Occupation: Singer-songwriter
- Instruments: Vocals; guitar
- Years active: 2006–present
- Labels: Deckdisc, Mess

Perla Fernandes dos Santos (born November 28, 1988) is a Brazilian singer commonly known by Perlla. Perlla rose to fame with her first album, Eu Só Quero Ser Livre, in early 2006.

== Biography ==
Perlla started singing in church at age 4. At 15, she officially started her career when she met Brazilian DJ and musical producer DJ Marlboro and he was enchanted with her voice. Her first album, produced by DJ Marlboro, was released in 2006. Eu Só Quero Ser Livre, from DeckDisc records, was a strong success in the Brazilian charts. She sings of teenage life with its disillusion and strange and funny situations. Many people consider her style Melodic funk, but Perlla herself does not quite agree.

With a 32-show-per-month average, Perlla is considered the Brazilian music revelation. The song "Tremendo Vacilão", about a troubled relationship, topped the charts in 2006. "Totalmente Demais", a remake of the famous Brazilian singer Caetano Veloso's song, was the theme tune of the Brazilian telenovela "Cobras & Lagartos" which aired on TV Globo. She also collaborated with the samba group Disfarce; the single, "Solução", was another success in Brazil.

Perlla was engaged to soccer player Leonardo Moura, who currently plays for Grêmio.

== Discography ==
=== Albums ===
List of albums, with selected chart positions and certifications
Title	Album details	Peak chart positions	Certifications
Title	Album details	BRA	Certifications
Eu Só Quero Ser Livre	Released: June 12, 2006; Label: Deckdisc	1	ABPD: Gold
Mais Perto	Released: November 19, 2007; Label: Deckdisc	5	ABPD: Gold

=== Singles ===
List of singles, with selected chart positions and certifications
Year	Title	Peak chart positions	Album
Year	Title	BRA	Album
2006	"Totalmente Demais"	5	Eu Só Quero Ser Livre
2006	"Tremendo Vacilão"	1	Eu Só Quero Ser Livre
2006	"Eu Vou"	5	Eu Só Quero Ser Livre
2007	"Depois do Amor" (feat. Belo (singer))	2	Mais Perto
2007	"Carrapato"	15	Mais Perto
2008	"Tanta Solidão"	9	Mais Perto
2008	"Menina Chapa-Quente"	4	Mais Perto
2008	"Motivos"	71	Mais Perto
2009	"Quem Não Quer Sou Eu"	26	Mais Perto
2009	"Beijo de Cinema"	22	Mais Perto
2010	"Rinto à Toa"	45	—N/a
2017	"Rainha"	—	—N/a
2018	"No Meu Comando"	—	—N/a
2018	"Eita Essa Novinha"	—	—N/a

=== Featuring ===
List of singles, with selected chart positions and certifications
Year	Title	Peak chart positions	Album
Year	Title	BRA	Album
2008	"Solução" (feat. Disfarce Band)	25	Disfarce
2009	"Depois do Amor" (feat. Belo (singer))	2	Mais Perto
2009	"No Rádio" (feat. Sociedade do Samba)	14	E Daí?
2009	"Selinho na Boca" (feat. Latino)	4	Junto e Misturado
2009	"Te Amar Pra Sempre" (feat. Alexandre Pires)	23	Em Casa
2009	"Se Vira" (feat. Latino)	93	Junto e Misturado: Fazendo a Festa
2010	"Te Amare (Vou Te Amar)" (feat. Mario Guerrero)	—	Do Chile
2017	"Passinho Diferente"" (feat. Tonzão)	—	—N/a

=== Gospel albums ===
List of albums, with selected chart positions and certifications
Title	Album details	Peak chart positions
Title	Album details	BRA Christ
A minha Vida Mudou	Released: February 28, 2013; Label: Central Gospel Music	7
Noite de Paz – Canções Para Celebrar	Released: December 10 de 2014; Label: Deckdisc	—

=== Gospel singles ===
Year	Single	BRA Christ	Album
2013	"A Minha Vida Mudou (Pra Sempre)"	—	A Minha Vida Mudou
2013	"A Vitória Já É Minha"	19	A Minha Vida Mudou

== Tours ==
- Turnê Livre (2006–07)
- Turnê Mais Perto (2008–09)
- Turnê Europa (2009–10)
- Turnê Minha Vida Mudou (2014)
