= Funk carioca =

Genre of hip hop style music

- 8 bars of a funk carioca beat
- Other names: Brazilian funk; baile funk; funk
- Stylistic origins: Miami bass; freestyle; samba; Brazilian bass; electro; techno; candomblé
- Cultural origins: Mid-1980s, Rio de Janeiro, Brazil
- Typical instruments: Drum machine; turntables; sampler; synthesizer; rapping; singing

Subgenres
- Proibidão; melodic funk; funk paulista

Funk carioca (Brazilian Portuguese pronunciation: [ˈfɐ̃k(i) kɐɾiˈɔkɐ, - kaɾ-]), also known as baile funk, Brazilian funk, or simply funk, is a Brazilian hip hop-influenced music genre from Rio de Janeiro, taking influences from musical styles such as Miami bass and freestyle.

In Brazil, "baile funk" refers not to the music, but to the actual parties or discotheques in which the music is played (Portuguese pronunciation: [ˈbajʎi], from baile, meaning "ball"). Although it originated in Rio (carioca is a Rio demonym), "funk carioca" has become increasingly popular among working classes in other parts of Brazil. In the whole country, funk carioca is most often simply known as "funk", although it is very different musically from the American genre of funk music. However, it still shows urban Afrobeat influences.

== Overview ==
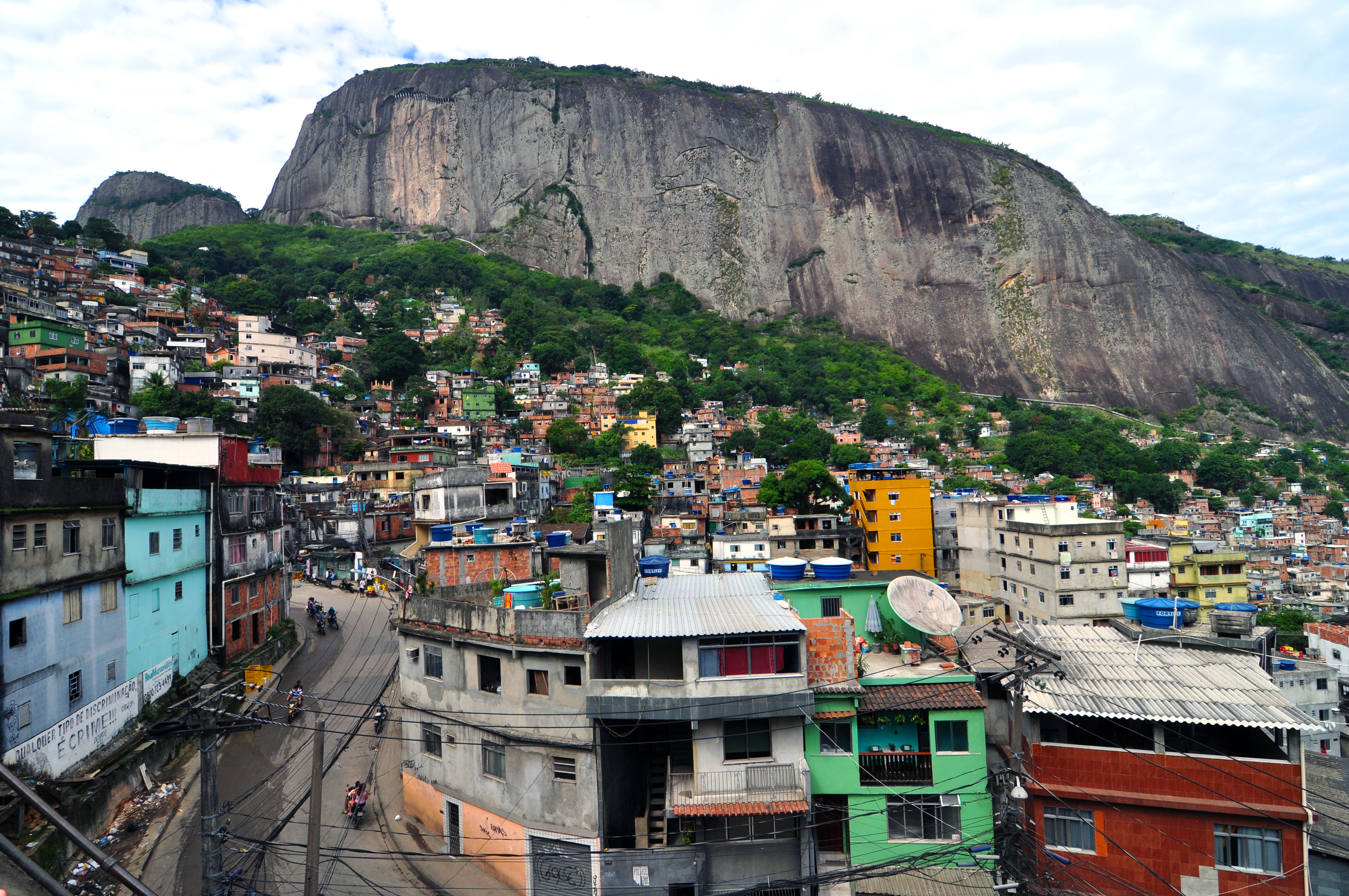
Funk carioca was born in the 1980s in Rio de Janeiro's favelas.

Funk carioca was once a direct derivative of samba, Miami bass, Latin music, Caribbean music, traditional African religious music, candombe, hip-hop and freestyle (another Miami-based genre) music from the US. The reason why these genres, very localized in the US, became popular and influential in Rio de Janeiro is due to proximity. Miami was a popular plane stop for Rio DJs to buy the latest American records. Along with the Miami influence came the longtime influence of the slave trade in Colonial Brazil. Various African religions like vodun and candomble were brought with the enslaved Africans to the Americas. The same beat is found in Afro-religious music in the African diaspora, and many black Brazilians identify as being part of this religion. This genre of music was mainly started by those in black communities in Brazil, therefore a boiling pot of influences to derive the hallmark.

Many similar types of music genres can be found in Caribbean island nations such as; Jamaica, Cuba, Dominican Republic, Barbados, Haiti, Puerto Rico, among others. Bounce music, which originates from New Orleans, Louisiana, also has a similar beat. New Orleans, originally a French territory, was a hub for the Atlantic slave trade before it was sold to the United States. All of these areas with similar music genres retain the influence of American hip hop, African music, and Latin music.

During the 1970s, nightclubs in Rio de Janeiro played funk and soul music. One of the bands that was formed in this period was Soul Grand Prix.

In the 1980s, during the post-disco era, the audience began to split between two types of parties: baile charme and baile funk. Baile charme focused on new forms of contemporary R&B, often featuring ballads — hence the name "charme," meaning charm or smoothness. Baile funk, on the other hand, featured fast-paced dance music like Miami bass and freestyle, aimed at energetic dancing. This division marked an important shift in the music scene and in popular parties of the time.

Funk carioca was popularized in the 1980s in Rio de Janeiro's favelas, the city's predominantly Afro-Brazilian slums. From the mid-1990s onwards, the genre progressively gained popularity, becoming a mainstream phenomenon in Brazil by the mid-2010s. Funk songs discuss topics as varied as poverty, human dignity, racial pride of black people, sex, violence, and social injustice. Social analysts believe that funk carioca is a genuine expression of the severe social issues that burden the poor and black people in Rio.

According to DJ Marlboro, the main influence for the emergence of funk carioca was the single "Planet Rock" by Afrika Bambaataa and Soulsonic Force, released in 1982.

Funk in its early days mostly consisted of loops of electronic drums from Miami bass or freestyle records and the 4–6 beat afrobeat tempo, while a few artists composed them with actual drum machines. The most common drum beat was a loop of DJ Battery Brain's "808 volt", commonly referred to as "Voltmix", though Hassan's "Pump Up the Party" is also notable. Nowadays, funk carioca rhythms are mostly based on tamborzão rhythms instead of the older drum machine loops.

Melodies are usually sampled. Older songs typically chopped up freestyle samples for the melody or had none at all. Modern funk uses a set of samples from various sources, notably horn and accordion stabs, as well as the horn intro to the "Rocky" theme. Funk carioca has always used a small catalog of rhythms and samples that almost all songs take from (commonly with several in the same song). Funk carioca songs can either be instrumental or include rapping, singing, or something in between the two. Popularized by Brazilians and other Afro-Latino people, the saying "Bum-Cha-Cha, Bum Cha-Cha", "Bum-Cha-Cha, Cha Cha" or even "Boom-Pop-Pop, Pop, Pop" is a representation of the beat that comes along in most funk songs.

Funk carioca is different from the funk that originated in the US. Starting in 1970, styles like bailes da pesada, black soul, shaft, band funk started to emerge in Rio de Janeiro. As time went on, DJs started to look for other rhythms of black music, but the original name did not remain. Funk carioca first emerged and is played throughout the state of Rio de Janeiro, but not only in the city of Rio, as Rio natives like to believe. Funk carioca is mostly appealing to the youth. In the decade of the 1980s, anthropologist Herman Vianna was the first social scientist to take funk as an object to study in his master's thesis, which gave origin to the book O Mundo Funk carioca, which translates to The Carioca Funk World (1988). During that decade, funk dances lost a bit of popularity due to the emergence of disco music, a pop version of soul and funk, especially after the release of the film Saturday Night Fever (1977) starring John Travolta and with its soundtrack of the band Bee Gees. At the time, the then-teenager Fernando Luís Mattos da Matta was interested in the discotheque when listening to the program Cidade Disco Club on Radio City of Rio de Janeiro (102.9 FM). Years later, Fernando would adopt the nickname of DJ Marlboro and the radio would be known as the Rio "rock radio".

== Subgenres ==
There are several subgenres derived from funk carioca.

=== Brega funk ===
Brega funk is a subgenre of Funk Carioca that originated in Recife, influenced by brega and arrocha in the early 2010s in the northeast region of Brazil. Unlike classic funk carioca, brega funk has a polished sound that features syncopated and shimmering MIDI pianos, synthesizers, often filtered guitars and the distinct pitched metallic snare drums called caixas, vocal chops are a common companion to the wobbly kick rhythm and up-down bass inherited from brega and, although the genre commonly ranges from 160 to 180 BPM, the half-time tempo makes it seem slower than other funk subgenres. An example of the Brega funk genre is the song "Parabéns" by Pabllo Vittar.

=== Funk melody ===
Funk melody is based on electro rhythms but with a romantic lyrical approach. It has been noted for being powered by female artists. Among the popular funk melody singers are Anitta, Perlla, Babi, and Copacabana Beat.

=== Funk ostentação ===
Funk ostentação is a sub-genre of Rio de Janeiro funk created in São Paulo in 2008. The lyrical and thematic content of songs in this style focuses mainly on conspicuous consumption, as well as a focus on materialistic activities, glorification of the style of urban life, and ambitions to leave the favela. Since then, funk ostentação has been strongly associated with the emerging nova classe média (new middle class) in Brazil.

=== Proibidão ===
Proibidão is a derivative of funk carioca related to prohibited practices. The content of the genre involves the sale of illegal drugs and the war against police agencies, as well as the glorification and praise of the drug cartels, similar to gangsta rap.

=== Rasteirinha ===
Rasteirinha or Raggafunk is a slower style of Rio de Janeiro funk that rests around 96 BPM and uses atabaques, tambourines and beatboxing. It also incorporates influences from reggaeton and axé. "Fuleragem" by MC WM is the best-known song of the Rasteirinha genre.

=== Rave funk ===
Rave funk is a mix of funk carioca and electronic music, created in 2016 by DJ GBR. Among rave funk's most popular songs is "É Rave Que Fala Né" by Kevinho. Another notable example is "São Paulo", a 2024 collaboration between Brazilian singer Anitta and Canadian artist The Weeknd.

=== Funk 150 BPM ===
In 2018, the Funk carioca of 150 beats per minute or 150 BPM was created by DJs Polyvox and Rennan da Penha. In 2019, the funk carioca 150 BPM was adopted by carnival blocks. "Ela É Do Tipo", by Kevin O Chris, is one of the most popular songs of the genre.

=== Funk mandelão ===
Funk mandelão, also known as Ritmo dos Fluxos, is a subgenre that emerged in São Paulo in the late 2010s, inspired by the Baile do Mandela, a popular party in Praia Grande. The term "mandelão" comes from "Mandela", a reference to the South African leader Nelson Mandela. Mandelão is characterized by having simple and repetitive lyrics. The musical production is minimalist and raw, with heavy beats and blown bass, which create a catchy and danceable rhythm. Some of the instruments used in mandelão are the piano, synthesizer, sampler and the computer. Funk mandelão is also marked by having its own choreography, which consists of fast and synchronized movements of the arms and legs.

An example of the success of Mandelão was the song "Automotivo Bibi Fogosa", sung by the Brazilian artist Bibi Babydoll, which reached the top of Spotify music charts in Ukraine in 2023 and reached #3 on both Belarus and Kazakhstan. It spread throughout the rest of Europe, mainly in former Soviet Union states.

=== Funk automotivo ===
Funk automotivo (also known as Brazilian phonk outside of Brazil) is a subgenre of Funk Carioca that blends elements of funk mandelão, electronic music, bass music creating a distinct and aggressive sound, with lyrics that address topics such as drugs, sex, and ostentation. Since early 2023, Funk automotivo has become misnomered as "Brazilian phonk", which combines elements of funk automotivo with drift phonk's signature 808 cowbells, and was created by the Norwegian producer William Rød, known as Slowboy. The genre label "Brazilian phonk" is not widely used in Brazil, and Brazilian produced music that is identified as such in the West is more likely to be referenced in Brazil under the name "funk automotivo". Despite being known as “Brazilian phonk”, the rhythm is not similar to it and does not belong to either phonk or drift phonk. It is only confused with them due to its similar pronunciation, electronic sound, and powerful bass.

=== Pagofunk ===
Like samba-rap, fusion of funk carioca with pagode, the term also refers to parties where both genres are played, the origins of the subgenre can be traced back to the mid 90s, in 1997, the duo Claudinho & Buchecha released the song Fuzuê on the album A Forma, the song uses a cavaquinho, an instrument present in genres such as samba, choro and pagode, in the lyrics, the duo pays tribute to pagode artists. Grupo Raça was successful with "Ela sambou, eu dancei", written by Arlindo Cruz, A. Marques and Geraldão, which alluded to funk carioca. In 2014, the song was reinterpreted with elements of carioca funk with Arlindo Cruz himself with Mr. Catra.

Mc Leozinho made use of the cavaquinho in the song Sente a pegada from 2008. Artists such as MC Delano and Ludmilla also use the cavaquinho in some songs, in 2015, Ludimilla also participated in a duet with the band Molejo in Polivalência from the album of the same name released in 2000, in 2020, she released Numanice, an EP dedicated to the pagode.

=== Funk bruxaria ===
Funk bruxaria is a subgenre that emerged in funk parties in the South Zone of São Paulo in the 2020s. It is characterized by its aggressive sound and horror atmosphere, with heavy use of high-pitched sounds (known as "tuin" or "ear-drum burst"), synthesizers and distortions. The genre also has some influences from electronic music and heavy metal. The sound became popular in funk parties such as the Baile da DZ7 in Paraisópolis, and the Baile do Helipa in Heliópolis. Among the main exponents of the genre are DJ K, DJ Arana and DJ Blakes.

== Global recognition ==
=== Recognition in Europe ===
Until the year 2000, funk carioca was only a regional phenomenon. Then, the European media began to report its peculiar combination of music and social issues, with a strong sexual appeal (often pornographic).

In 2001, for the first time, funk carioca tracks appeared on a non-Brazilian label. One example is the album Favela Chic, released by BMG. It contained three old-school funk carioca hits, including the song "Popozuda Rock n' Roll" by De Falla.

In 2003, the tune Quem Que Caguetou (Follow Me Follow Me) by Black Alien & Speed, which was not a big hit in Brazil, was then used in a sports car commercial in Europe, and it helped increase the popularity of funk carioca. Brazilian duo Tetine compiled and mixed the compilation Slum Dunk Presents Funk Carioca, released by British label Mr Bongo Records featuring funk artists such as Deize Tigrona, Taty Quebra Barraco, Bonde do Tigrão, amongst others. From 2002, Bruno Verner and Eliete Mejorado also broadcast Funk Carioca and interviewed artists in their radio show Slum Dunk on Resonance Fm. Berlin music journalist and DJ Daniel Haaksman released the seminal CD-compilations Rio Baile Funk Favela Booty Beats in 2004 and More Favela Booty Beats in 2006 through Essay Recordings. He launched the international career of Popozuda Rock n´Roll artist Edu K, whose baile funk anthem was used in a soft drink commercial in Germany. Haaksman continued to produce and distribute many new baile funk records, especially the EP series "Funk Mundial" and "Baile Funk Masters" on his label Man Recordings.

In 2004, dance clubs from Eastern Europe, mainly Romania and Bulgaria, increased the popularity of funk carioca due to the strong sexual appeal of the music and dance, also known as Bonde das Popozudas. Many funk carioca artists started to do shows abroad at that time. DJ Marlboro and Favela Chic Paris club were the pioneer travelers and producers. The funk carioca production was, until then, limited to playing in the ghettos and the Brazilian pop market. DJ Marlboro, a major composer of funk carioca's tunes, declared in 2006 in the Brazilian Isto É magazine how astonished he was with the sudden overseas interest in the genre. He would go on to travel in over 10 European countries.

In London, duo Tetine assembled a compilation album called Slum Dunk Presents Funk Carioca, which was released by Mr Bongo Records in 2004. Tetine also ran the weekly radio show Slum Dunk on London's radio art station Resonance Fm 104.4. Their radio show was entirely dedicated to funk carioca and worked as a platform for the duo to produce and organize a series of film programmes as well as interviews and gigs involving funk carioca artists from Rio. Tetine was also responsible for the first screening of the post-feminist documentary Eu Sou Feia Mas Tô Na Moda by filmmaker Denise Garcia, which was co-produced by Tetine in London, and first shown in the city at the Slum Dunk Film Program at Brady Arts Centre in Brick Lane in March 2005. Apart from this, Tetine also produced two albums with experimental DIY queer funk carioca tracks: Bonde do Tetão, released by Brazilian label Bizarre Records in 2004, and L.I.C.K My Favela, released by Kute Bash Records in 2005. Tetine also recorded with Deize Tigrona the track "I Go to the Doctor", included in the LP L.I.C.K My Favela in 2005 and later on their album Let Your X's Be Y's, released by Soul Jazz Records in 2008.

In Italy, Irma Records released the 2005 compilation Colors Music #4: Rio Funk. Many small labels (notably European label Arcade Mode and American labels Flamin´Hotz and Nossa) released several compilations and EPs in bootleg formats.

The artist MIA brought mainstream international popularity to funk carioca with her single Bucky Done Gun released in 2005, and brought attention to American DJ Diplo, who had worked on M.I.A.'s 2004 mixtape Piracy Funds Terrorism on the tracks Baile Funk One, Baile Funk Two, and Baile Funk Three. Diplo made a bootleg mixtape, Favela on Blastin, in 2004 after Ivanna Bergese shared with him some compiled remix mixtapes of her performance act Yours Truly. He also produced the documentary Favela on Blast, which was released in July 2010 and documents the role, culture, and character of funk carioca in Rio's favelas.

Other indie video-documentaries have been made in Europe, especially in Germany and Sweden. These generally focused on the social issues in the favelas. One of the most famous of these series of documentaries is Mr Catra the faithful (2005) by Danish filmmaker Andreas Rosforth Johnsen, broadcast by many European open and cable television channels.

London-based artist Sandra D'Angelo was the first Italian singer-producer to bring funk carioca to Italy. She performed in London with MC Gringo at Notting Hill Arts Club in 2008. She performed her baile funk productions for the contest Edison Change the Music in 2008. Sandra D'Angelo performed Baile Funk also in New York and produced tracks with EDU KA (Man Recordings) and DJ Amazing Clay from Rio.

In 2008, Berlin label Man Recordings released Gringão, the debut album by German MC Gringo — the only non-Brazilian MC performing in the bailes of Rio de Janeiro.

English indie pop band Everything Everything claims the drum patterns used on their Top 40 single Cough Cough were inspired by those used on Major Lazer's Pon de Floor, a funk carioca song.

== Stylistic differences ==
=== In African music ===
Gqom, an electronic dance music genre from Durban, South Africa, is often conflated with baile funk due to similar origins in ghettos, heavy bass, and associations with illegalities. Despite these parallels, gqom and baile funk are distinct, especially in their production styles. Over time, it became common for musical artists to integrate baile funk with gqom.

== Criticism ==
In Brazil, funk carioca lyrics are often criticized due to their violent and sexually explicit lyrics. Girls are called "cachorras" (bitches) and "popozudas" – women with large buttocks, and many songs revolve around sex. "Novinhas" (young/pubescent girls) are also a frequent theme in funk carioca songs. Some of these songs, however, are sung by women.

The extreme banalization of sex and the incitement of promiscuity is viewed as a negative aspect of the funk carioca culture. Besides the moral considerations, in favelas, where sanitary conditions are poor and sex education is low, this might lead to public health and social issues. In such communities, definitive contraceptive methods are hardly available, and due to a lack of education and awareness, family planning is close to nonexistent. This environment results in unwanted pregnancies, population overgrowth, and eventually the growth of the communities (favelização).

The glamorization of criminality in the favelas is also frequently viewed as another negative consequence of funk carioca. Some funk songs, belonging to a style known as "proibidão" ("the forbidden"), have very violent lyrics and are sometimes composed by drug-dealing gangs. Its themes include praising the murders of rival gang members and cops, intimidating opponents, claiming power over the favelas, robbery, drug use, and the illicit life of drug dealers in general. Authorities view some of these lyrics as "recruiting" people to organized crime and inciting violence, and playing some of these songs is thus considered a crime.

Due to the lack of regulation and the locations where they usually take place, "bailes funk" are also very crime-prone environments. They are popular hot spots for drug trade and consumption, dealers display power frequenting the parties heavily armed, and even murder rates are high.

More popular funk carioca artists usually compose two different sets of similar lyrics for their songs: one gentler, more "appropriate" version, and another with a harsher, cruder set of lyrics (not unlike the concept of "clean" and "explicit" versions of songs). The first version is the one broadcast by local radio stations; the second is played in dance halls, parties, and in public by sound cars. Recurrent lyric topics in funk carioca are explicit sexual positions, the funk party, the police force, and the life of slum dwellers in the favelas. Another large part of the lyrics is the use of the world around them – mainly the poverty that has enveloped the area. This is usually denounced in the lyrics, and the hope for a better life is carried through many of their messages.

== See also ==
- Surra de Bunda
- Miami bass
