= Melody (Brazilian singer) =

Brazilian pop singer

- Melody in 2026
- Born: Gabriela Abreu Severino; February 4, 2007 (age 19); São Paulo, Brazil
- Occupation: Singer
- Years active: 2015–present
- Agent: Belinho
- Musical career
- Genres: Pop; Dance-pop; funk melody; piseiro
- Instrument: Vocals
- Label: MB HITS

Gabriela Abreu Severino also known as Melody (Portuguese pronunciation: [mɛləd͡ʒi] mEl-uh-jee) is a Brazilian singer. She became known for her falsetto.

== Early life ==
According to her father, Thiago Abreu, better known as MC Belinho, Gabriella dreamed of becoming a singer from a young age. Her father is a funk carioca singer, and her sister, who is one year older, is known as Bella Angel. Her mother did not become involved in her musical career until January 2019, stating that she had been prevented from doing so by Belinho and their daughters. Belinho himself later confirmed this account.

== Career ==
=== 2015: "Fale de Mim" and falsetto ===
Melody has won national notoriety in early of 2015, after posting a video on her Facebook page singing the song "Fale de Mim", a song written by her father, Belinho. In a next video, she tried to do a falsetto by Christina Aguilera that went viral. Soon after, she made another video doing falsetto, this time with a friend of her father's.

In 2016 Melody announced through social media that she would no longer make falsetto parodies, which would improve her singing for her next songs.

=== 2018–present: "Tô Bem, Tô Zen" and "Assalto Perigoso" ===
On June 5, 2018, Melody released her new video. Vai rebola that reached 21,708,111 views just on her channel. Months later she dyed her hair blonde for future work. For the 2018 FIFA World Cup, she released the hit Som da Copa in partnership with singer Vakeria. A month later, she along with her sister Bella Angel released the new hit Tô Bem, Tô Zen, through the KondZilla channel, with the collaboration of famous YouTubers "Viih Tube" and "Gregory Kessey" along with singer "Nicks Vieira". Weeks after its release, the clip was number 4 on the YouTube's rankings. In three months, the videoclip reached 80,793,549 views. On October 16, she together with the duo Carlos and Christian, released together the singer's hit Hoje eu tô um Nojo and hitting 4,647,647 views. And his song Assalto Perigoso is currently successful on the radio and among the famous, reaching a considerable position in the lists of successes. In 2022 Melody becomes the youngest artist in Latin America to reach a global Spotify top 200 rank with the song Pipoco.

In 2026, she was dubbed the "Princess of Brazilian Pop" by Galore Magazine.

== Artistry ==
=== Musical style, genres and influences ===
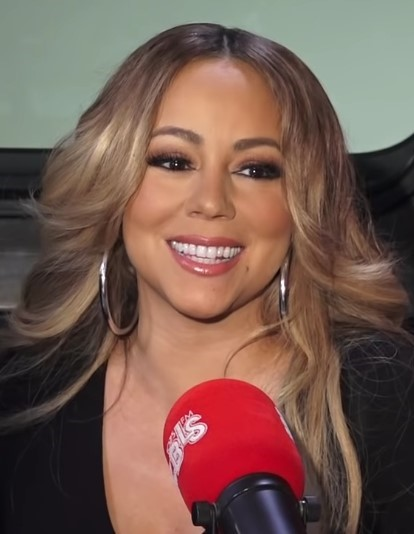
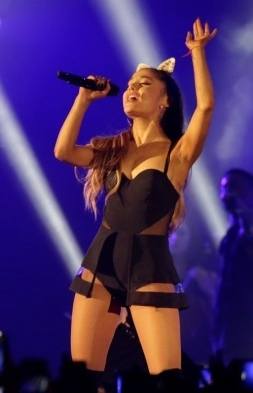
Melody credits Mariah Carey (left) and Ariana Grande (right) as her major vocal influences

The rhythm of Melody's songs is Pop and Funk melody, the timbre of Melody is lyric Soprano, with treble and falsetto tuning. Melody grew up listening to international artists such as Christina Aguilera, Mariah Carey and Ariana Grande, most of her covers are falsettos where she sings the great songs of her inspirations. When she was younger, Melody made a cover using only Mariah Carrey falsettes where she tried to bring her highs closer to the singer's. Melody telling to EGO, "Falset is part of my career" where it says that it decreases to make falsetto but it will not stop, Melody also did a cover on YouTube at Christmas saying she was the Brazilian Mariah Carey and Ariana Grande. Melody has already said that Ariana Grande was her biggest inspiration for her artistic career, where most of her cover songs are by Ariana, many of these songs have gone viral with millions of views.

== Discography ==
=== Singles ===
==== As a lead artist ====
List of singles as lead artist, with selected chart positions, showing year released and album name
Title	Year	Peak chart positions	Album
Title	Year	BRA	Album
"Tô Bem, Tô Zen" (feat. Bella Angel)	2018	–	—N/a
"Hoje eu tô um Nojo"	2018	—	—N/a
"Vingança" (feat. Bella Angel)	2019	—	—N/a
"Anjo"	2019	—	—N/a
"Fale de Mim"	2021	—	—N/a
"Assalto Perigoso"	2022	29	—N/a
"Fake Love 2"	2022	–	—N/a
"Love, Love" (feat. Naldo Benny)	2023	50	—N/a

=== As featured artist ===
Title	Year	Peak chart position								Album
Title	Year	CAN	FRA	IRE	NZHot	UK	USBubb	US DanceElectronic	WW	Album
"Você Me Faz Tão Bem"(Rafinha Dragão & Melody)	2016	_	_	_	_	_	_	_	_	
"Nocaute" (Tilia feat. Melody)	2021	_	_	_	_	_	_	_	_	
"Pipoco" (Ana Castela feat. Melody)	2022	_	_	_	_	_	_	_	_	
"Barbie de Chapéu" (Paula Guilherme feat. Melody)	2023	_	_	_	_	_	_	_	_	
Mi Chico -Remix (DJ Goja feat. Jason Derulo & Melody)	2026	55	43	41	6	30	19	6	92	

== Awards and nominations ==
Year	Association	Category	Nominated work	Result	Ref.
2015	Prêmio Jovem Brasileiro 2015	Video Mais Visto De 2015	Herself	Won	
2024	Prêmio Jovem Brasileiro 2024	Best Singer	Herself	Won	
