= Charme =

Charme may refer to:

- Charme, Wisconsin, United States
- Charmé, Charente, France
- La Charme, Jura, France
- Le Charme, Loiret, France
- Charme (typeface), a foundry type made by Ludwig & Mayer
- Charme (dance), a street dance style that originated in Brazil

== See also ==
- Charmes (disambiguation)
