= DJ K =

Brazilian record producer (born 2000 or 2001)

- Born: Kaique Alves Vieira; 2000 or 2001 (age 24–25)
- Origin: Diadema, São Paulo, Brazil
- Genres: Funk bruxaria
- Occupation: Record producer
- Years active: 2017–present

Kaique Alves Vieira (born 2000 or 2001), known professionally as DJ K, is a Brazilian record producer from Diadema, São Paulo.

== Early life ==
Kaique Alves Vieira was born in Diadema, a municipality in the Greater São Paulo area of Brazil, where he was also raised, in 2000 or 2001. He grew up in a musically active family; his father, an evangelical pastor and drummer, supported his career in Brazilian funk despite his religious background. An uncle who played in a reggae band frequently took him to performances and recording sessions, which "fascinated" him and contributed to his aspiration to work in the field.

During his childhood, Vieira was exposed to a wide variety of musical genres, often introduced by his father. These included Brazilian hip-hop and Brazilian rock groups such as Racionais MC's, Planet Hemp, and Charlie Brown Jr., as well as gospel, sertanejo, and forró. He also listened to international rock bands including Rage Against the Machine, Led Zeppelin, and System of a Down. Rock and reggae became personal favorites, with rock elements later influencing his funk productions.

== Career ==
Vieira began producing music at the age of 17, teaching himself to use the digital audio workstation FL Studio. After approximately one year of practice, he began releasing his work online. He has stated that funk was a practical choice, as it could be produced with only a computer and headphones, unlike rock or reggae, which typically require a band and instruments. Before earning a living from music, Vieira held various jobs, including assistant mechanic, clothing salesman, and electrician's helper, humorously noting that he "didn't last 2 months in the same company". Financial hardship, including difficulties paying rent and utility bills, nearly led him to abandon music; he accepted an advance from Ugandan label Nyege Nyege Tapes to produce his debut album partly out of necessity.

His public performances began in the early 2020s at Baile do Helipa, a street party in Heliópolis, São Paulo's largest favela. He produced tracks for the large paredão (speaker wall) systems used at these events. His first set was described as a "catastrophe" that drew little attention, but he considered it a formative moment, deciding that performing was what he wanted to do. By 2021, he had achieved online attention with the track "Olha o Barulinho da Cama Renk Renk Renk", which amassed over 17 million streams on Spotify, and later with "Tuin Destrói Noia". Around this period he established the label Bruxaria Sound, which by mid-2023 counted 16 artists in its roster, later expanding to more than 15 MCs and DJs, with the aim of training and promoting performers within the funk mandelão style.

=== 2023: Pânico no Submundo ===
DJ K's debut album, Pânico no Submundo, was released on 14 July 2023 by Nyege Nyege Tapes. Conceived during the COVID-19 pandemic, it was inspired by the unrest and "literal panic" in the favelas during lockdowns, which Vieira described as a "cry for help". The 15-track album was recorded in three to four days on his mother's laptop using FL Studio, with MCs often recording vocals on iPhones from closets. His self-described style, funk bruxaria, combined funk mandelão with horrorcore elements, incorporating high-frequency tuin sounds (likened to tinnitus), horror film samples from Halloween and The Purge, distorted basslines, maniacal laughter, sirens, and abrupt noise bursts.

The album drew significant international attention. On 27 July 2023, the American online music magazine Pitchfork awarded it a 7.9/10 rating, higher than the publication's score for the Beatles' Yellow Submarine (6.2). The comparison to the Beatles' score and other artists like Taylor Swift, Slipknot, and Korn circulated widely on Brazilian social media, becoming an internet meme. DJ K later stated he was unfamiliar with Pitchfork at the time, initially misreading the name as "Pitchforte", and woke up to a flood of online mentions. The review praised the album as a "transmission straight from the favelas" rather than an outsider's curated introduction to baile funk, highlighting its avant-garde vision and resistance to mainstream appropriation.

AllMusic also reviewed the album positively, rating it four out of five stars describing it as "bizarre, surreal", and "extremely dark, sinister, and spooky", while noting "nothing else on earth that sounds like this". By late July 2023, DJ K had over 140,000 monthly Spotify listeners, a figure that would later exceed 300,000 in January 2024. Brazilian outlet Música Instantânea ranked the album 41st in its "The 50 Best Brazilian Albums of 2023" list, while Pitchfork included it among both its "Best Electronic Music of 2023" and "Best Music by Latine and Spanish Artists in 2023". Following the album's release, DJ K performed at LGBTQ+-oriented parties such as Mamba Negra and Buero in São Paulo. In October 2023 he embarked on his first international tour, which included dates in Germany, England, France, and Belgium; he noted that he had never flown before and saw the tour as a moment when "the favela won" due to its financial impact. A documentary on his rise, Terror Mandelão, premiered in January 2024.

=== 2024: O Fim! ===
In June 2024, DJ K released his second album, O Fim!, through Bruxaria Sound. The record continued the aggressive and experimental approach of his debut but with a dirtier and more politically charged tone. It addressed subjects such as armed violence, nightlife excess, and war, drawing on events like the conflict in Gaza and violence in Rio de Janeiro. Critics noted its atmosphere as replacing horror cinema tropes with raw social realities. Tracks included "Set Anti Sistema" and "Beat Que Faz Até Sua Tia Baforar", which showed techno influences, and "Remédio Pra Noia", which sampled the children’s television programme Castelo Rá-Tim-Bum. Música Instantânea's Cleber Facchi awarded it an 8.2 rating.

=== 2025: Rádio Libertadora! ===
DJ K’s third album, Rádio Libertadora!, was released on 8 August 2025 by Nyege Nyege Tapes. He described it as "ideological and reflexive", framing it as a "cry for freedom" and connecting past political struggles to current social conditions in Brazil. The album opens with a 1969 radio address by revolutionary Carlos Marighella, followed by a female broadcaster calling for an end to the military dictatorship, underscoring funk's subversive history. While retaining sexual themes common in baile funk, its lyrics also address police brutality, gang violence, and educational inequality. Musical influences included Brazilian protest rap, particularly Racionais MC's and Emicida, as well as elements of early-2000s hip-hop, techno, and house.

The album reduced overt horror elements in favour of revolutionary messaging, though tracks such as "Mega Suicidio Auditivo" maintained extreme sonic intensity. Harry Tayofa of Pitchfork gave it a 6.5/10, praising its production but criticising what it saw as misogynistic lyrical content. DJ Mag's Henry Ivry called it "baile funk's vanguard", and Ammar Kalia, writing in The Guardian, gave it four out of five stars and described it as "explosive, cacophonous baile funk witchcraft" and a defiant response to the criminalization of funk street parties.

== Artistry ==
DJ K describes his sound as funk bruxaria, characterizing it as an aggressive, "punk of funk" style. It combines elements of funk mandelão with sonic motifs intended to evoke fear and disorientation. His work has been described as an "aural assault" and "psychological siege" by Raphael Helfand of The Fader, incorporating high-frequency noises known as tuin, a tinnitus-like pitch that alludes to lança perfume, a recreational inhalant associated with funk dance parties. Other common features include heavy distortion, sudden bursts of noise such as weather alert tones, ringing telephones, laser blasts, and samples of maniacal laughter. The result has been likened to a "miniature apocalypse" by DJ Mag or "sonic warfare" by Resident Advisor.

His productions often incorporate horrorcore and horror-themed elements, sampling film scores from works such as Halloween and The Purge. They are also influenced by electronic styles including South African gqom, Jersey club, European hardstyle, and distorted phonk, as well as 2000s hip-hop, techno, and house. He cites rock acts such as Evanescence, System of a Down, Guns N' Roses Pearl Jam, Rage Against the Machine, and Led Zeppelin among his influences, and has incorporated samples from sources as varied as the Muslim call to prayer. His songs are typically marked by the vocal tag "DJ K isn't producing anymore, he's doing witchcraft", a studio in-joke with an MC that became a hallmark of his work.

== Discography ==
=== Studio albums ===
- Pânico no Submundo (2023)
- O Fim! (2024)
- Radio Libertadora! (2025)
