= Prêmio Jovem Brasileiro =

- Current: Prêmio Jovem Brasileiro 2026
- Awarded for: A maior premiação jovem do mundo
- Country: Brazil
- Presented by: AgenciaZapping
- First award: 2002-currently
- Website: premiojovem.com.br

Prêmio Jovem Brasileiro (English: Young Award Brazilian) established in 2002, it honors the young people who are featured in music, television, film, sports, environment and Brazilian internet. Since 2018, the Prêmio Jovem Brasileiro has been streamed online. Initially, the event was broadcast through its official YouTube channel. Beginning in 2023, distribution shifted to the Band Entretê channel on YouTube and the BandPlay streaming platform, both operated by Grupo Bandeirantes de Comunicação.

== Editions ==
Edition	Date	Venue	City	Hosts	Ref.
20th	October 28, 2021	Teatro B32	São Paulo	Nadja Haddad, Bianca Andrade and Fred	
21st	2022	Áudio	São Paulo	Lexa	
22nd	2023	Áudio	São Paulo	Carla Diaz and Guto Melo	
23rd	2024	Áudio	São Paulo	Gkay, Guto Melo and Vanessa Bellini	
24th	2025	Áudio	São Paulo	Blogueirinha, Guto Melo and Vanessa Bellini	

== Winners ==
=== 2015 Winners ===
Among the winners in 2015 stood Thaeme & Thiago, Neymar, Sophia Abrahão, Melody, Rhayner Cadete, Mel Fronckowiack, Lexa, Tulio Borgias, Larissa Manoela, Kéfera Buchmann, Hugo Gloss, Ivete Sangalo, Chris Leão, Arthur Aguiar, Camila Queiroz, and Agatha Moreira.

=== 2016 Winners ===
Among the winners in 2016 stood Anajú Dorigon, Anitta, Arthur Nory, Hugo Gloss, Sophia Abrahão, Ludmilla, Nah Cardoso, Neymar, Catraca Livre, Nonô Lellis, Thaynara OG, and Whinderson Nunes.

== 2016 ==
In 2016, came the 15th edition of the Prêmio Jovem Brasileiro, the award had the presence of several Brazilians famous

== 2017 ==
In 2017, the awards ceremony took place on September 25 in São Paulo, Brazil. Several celebrities attended the awards, among them Emilly Araújo, Maria Claudia, Sophia Abrahão, Whindersson Nunes, Mayla Araújo, Banda Malta, and Maisa.

== 2020 ==
In 2020, the award ceremony took place on September 22, 2020, in São Paulo, presented by Rodrigo Faro and for the first time it took place in the drive-in format due to the COVID-19 pandemic.

== Categorias ==
- Melhor Atriz Jovem
- Melhor Cantora Jovem
- Melhor Cantor Jovem
- Música do Ano
- Melhor Destino Turístico
- Melhor Programa - Voto do Júri
- Melhor Site - Voto do Júri
- Melhor Série
- Eu Conheço Um Jovem Talento
- Melhor Apresentador
- Melhor Banda - Voto da Galera
- Melhor Ator Jovem - Voto do Júri
- Melhor Site de Entretenimento
- Personalidade da Internet
- Cantora Revelação
- Cantor Revelação
- Melhor TikToker do Ano
- Diversidade e Inclusão
- Melhor Participante de Reality
- Melhor YouTuber
- Melhor Gamer
- Revelação Digital
- Melhor Fandom do Brasil
- Melhor TikToker
