= Mi Chico =

Single by DJ Goja
- Released: 27 March 2026
- Length: 1:57
- Label: Gamma
- Composer: Ovidiu Marius Goja
- Producer: DJ Goja

DJ Goja singles chronology
| "Like a G6" (2026) | "Mi Chico" (2026) |

Music video
- "Mi Chico" on YouTube

"Mi Chico" is a song by Romanian musician DJ Goja, released by American media company Gamma on 27 March 2026. A version featuring American singer Jason Derulo and Brazilian singer Melody was released on 26 June 2026.

== Background ==
Goja told the Romanian radio station Kiss FM that the idea for the song had come to him whilst he was working on children's music projects, explaining that he wanted to combine Afrobeats sounds with the structure of children's music, which is characterised by easy-to-remember and repetitive lyrics. Goja chose a title in Spanish because, in his view, that language evokes a summery atmosphere. His recent interest in Afro house inspired the songwriting process for the track, for which he wanted to create a song that makes people want to dance whilst also resonating emotionally with listeners.

== Composition and lyrics ==
The song incorporates elements of dance music, with a neon-lit nightlife vibe and a sensual atmosphere. The lyrics express a tension between desire, rhythm and freedom, centred around the chorus "She got that vibe Mi Chico, dance all night Mi Chico", which also opens the song.

== Virality ==
The song was promoted by global K-pop artists such as Twice and Hearts2Hearts, which contributed to its viral success on social media. By June 2026, it had accumulated over 12 million views on YouTube.

== Jason Derulo and Melody version ==
=== Background and release ===
Following the viral success of the original song, American singer Jason Derulo congratulated Goja on Instagram, and Goja then suggested they produce a new version of the track. Derulo liked the idea and they then worked together for two weeks. Ahead of its release, the new version was promoted on TikTok via a teaser featuring a dance routine, which had generated more than 250,000 creations prior to the release date.

The new version was released on 26 June 2026, featuring Derulo and Brazilian singer Melody. The release was accompanied by a music video filmed in Paris, France. Directed by French filmmaker and choreographer Kevin Bago, it features Goja, Derulo, Melody and a troupe of 30 dancers, including the duo Les Twins.

=== Reception ===
The version has been described as an Afro house crossover incorporating elements of electronic music, contemporary pop and Latin influences. It has been described as an "easy sing-along" summery dance track, with a danceable and intense rhythm, whilst the music video has been described as a "visual spectacle full of color" featuring an "explosive choreography". In addition, the release was considered as an attempt to connect the Afro house trend with pop elements, at a time when the genre had gained popularity in recent years. Derulo said that the track was "one of those songs that instantly felt special", with "that perfect mix of rhythm, emotion and escapism that makes you want to dance all night".

== Track listing ==
- Digital download and streaming
1. "Mi Chico" – 1:57
- Digital download and streaming – Jason Derulo and Melody version
1. "Mi Chico" (Jason Derulo and Melody version) – 2:05

== Credits and personnel ==
Original version

- DJ Goja – composition, production, vocals

Jason Derulo and Melody version

- DJ Goja – composition, production
- Jason Derulo – composition, production, vocals
- Melody – vocals
- Evangelos Siakas – production, mastering engineering, mixing engineering
- Shawn Charles – composition

== Charts ==
=== Original version ===
==== Weekly charts ====
Weekly chart performance
| Chart (2026) | Peak position |
|---|---|
| Austria (Ö3 Austria Top 40) | 7 |
| Austria Airplay (MusicTrace) | 32 |
| Belgium (Ultratop 50 Flanders) | 12 |
| Belgium (Ultratop 50 Wallonia) | 1 |
| Central America Anglo Airplay (Monitor Latino) | 11 |
| Chile Anglo Airplay (Monitor Latino) | 8 |
| CIS Airplay (TopHit) | 28 |
| Dominican Republic Anglo Airplay (Monitor Latino) | 17 |
| Ecuador Anglo Airplay (Monitor Latino) | 13 |
| Estonia Airplay (TopHit) | 21 |
| Germany (GfK) | 5 |
| Germany Airplay (MusicTrace) | 2 |
| Greece International (IFPI) | 13 |
| Honduras Anglo Airplay (Monitor Latino) | 2 |
| Hungary (Single Top 40) | 37 |
| Israel (Mako Hitlist) | 62 |
| Latvia Airplay (LaIPA) | 12 |
| Lithuania (AGATA) | 90 |
| Lithuania Airplay (TopHit) | 45 |
| Malta Airplay (Radiomonitor) | 15 |
| Moldova Airplay (TopHit) | 120 |
| Netherlands (Dutch Top 40) | 1 |
| Netherlands (Single Top 100) | 5 |
| New Zealand (Recorded Music NZ) | 25 |
| Nicaragua Anglo Airplay (Monitor Latino) | 5 |
| North Macedonia Airplay (Radiomonitor) | 1 |
| Panama Anglo Airplay (Monitor Latino) | 3 |
| Portugal (AFP) | 22 |
| Russia Airplay (TopHit) | 25 |
| Serbia Airplay (Radiomonitor) | 3 |
| Slovakia Singles Digital (ČNS IFPI) | 17 |
| Slovenia Airplay (Radiomonitor) | 16 |
| Switzerland (Schweizer Hitparade) | 4 |
| Turkey International Airplay (Radiomonitor Türkiye) | 1 |
| UK Singles (Official Charts) | 80 |
| Uruguay Anglo Airplay (Monitor Latino) | 2 |
| Venezuela Anglo Airplay (Monitor Latino) | 2 |

==== Monthly charts ====
| Chart (2026) | Peak position |
|---|---|
| CIS Airplay (TopHit) | 89 |
| Estonia Airplay (TopHit) | 22 |
| Lithuania Airplay (TopHit) | 72 |
| Russia Airplay (TopHit) | 73 |

=== Jason Derulo and Melody version ===
==== Weekly charts ====
| Chart (2026) | Peak position |
|---|---|
| Belarus Airplay (TopHit) | 61 |
| Bulgaria Airplay (PROPHON) | 1 |
| Canada Hot 100 (Billboard) | 53 |
| CIS Airplay (TopHit) | 5 |
| Croatia International Airplay (Top lista) | 50 |
| Estonia Airplay (TopHit) | 16 |
| France (SNEP) | 43 |
| France Airplay (SNEP) | 26 |
| Global 200 (Billboard) | 59 |
| Greece International (IFPI) | 27 |
| Ireland (IRMA) | 41 |
| Israel (Mako Hitlist) | 62 |
| Kazakhstan Airplay (TopHit) | 196 |
| Latvia Airplay (TopHit) | 8 |
| Lithuania Airplay (TopHit) | 107 |
| Luxembourg (Billboard) | 5 |
| Moldova Airplay (TopHit) | 11 |
| New Zealand Hot Singles (RMNZ) | 6 |
| New Zealand Airplay (RCS) | 12 |
| Norway (VG-lista) | 53 |
| Poland Airplay (OLiS) | 4 |
| Poland Streaming (OLiS) | 43 |
| Romania Airplay (UPFR) | 1 |
| Romania Airplay (Media Forest) | 1 |
| Romania TV Airplay (Media Forest) | 5 |
| Russia Airplay (TopHit) | 8 |
| Slovakia Airplay (ČNS IFPI) | 10 |
| Suriname (Nationale Top 40) | 4 |
| Ukraine Airplay (TopHit) | 62 |
| UK Singles (Official Charts) | 25 |
| UK Independent (Official Charts) | 6 |
| US Afrobeats Songs (Billboard) | 1 |
| US Bubbling Under Hot 100 (Billboard) | 15 |
| US Hot Dance/Electronic Songs (Billboard) | 4 |
| US Pop Airplay (Billboard) | 24 |
| US Rhythmic Airplay (Billboard) | 19 |

==== Monthly charts ====
| Chart (2026) | Peak position |
|---|---|
| Belarus Airplay (TopHit) | 86 |
| CIS Airplay (TopHit) | 7 |
| Estonia Airplay (TopHit) | 26 |
| Latvia Airplay (TopHit) | 10 |
| Moldova Airplay (TopHit) | 17 |
| Romania Airplay (TopHit) | 1 |
| Russia Airplay (TopHit) | 13 |
| Ukraine Airplay (TopHit) | 81 |

== Certifications ==
List of certifications
| Region | Certification | Certified units/sales |
|---|---|---|
| Slovakia (ČNS IFPI) | Gold | 850,000^{†} |
^{†} Streaming-only figures based on certification alone.

== Release history ==
Release dates and formats for "Mi Chico"
| Region | Date | Format | Version | Label | Ref. |
|---|---|---|---|---|---|
| Italy | 26 March 2026 | Radio airplay | Original | Gamma | |
| Various | 27 March 2026 | Digital download; streaming | Original | Gamma | |
| Various | 26 June 2026 | Digital download; streaming | Jason Derulo and Melody version | Gamma | |
| Italy | 26 June 2026 | Radio airplay | Jason Derulo and Melody version | Gamma | |
| United States | 7 July 2026 | Contemporary hit radio | Jason Derulo and Melody version | The Foremast | |
