= Capricho Awards de Gato Nacional =

- Country: Brazil
- First award: 2001
- Currently held by: Ian Somerhalder (2014)

Capricho Awards de Gato Nacional is an award given annually since 2001 by the magazine Capricho, with open voting by the official Editora Abril site. The singer Taylor Swift, along with actor Bruno Gagliasso holds the record for most awards a total of 3.

In 2014 the category was called "drops", containing American and Brazilian artists, as indicated.

== Winners and indicated ==
Year	Winner	Indicated	Ref
2001	Reynaldo Gianecchini		
2002	Henri Castelli	Cauã Reymond; Rodrigo Santoro	
2003	There were no awards.		
2004	Bruno Gagliasso	Guilherme Berenguer; Rodrigo Santoro	
2005	Bruno Gagliasso		
2006	Reynaldo Gianecchini		
2007	Bruno Gagliasso		
2008	Di Ferrero		
2009	Rodrigo Hilbert		
2010	Caio Castro	Duan Socci; Fiuk; Humberto Carrão; Jayme Matarazzo	
2011	Chay Suede	Caio Castro; Chris Leão; Jonatas Faro; Neymar	
2012	Arthur Aguiar	Caio Castro; Fiuk; Rodrigo Simas	
2013	Caio Castro	Bruno Gissoni; Di Ferrero; Micael Borges; Rodrigo Simas	
2014	Ian Somerhalder	Chay Suede; Guilherme Leicam; Harry Styles	
2015	Justin Bieber		

== More Award ==
Artist	Awards
Bruno Gagliasso	3
Reynaldo Gianecchini	2
Caio Castro	2

== List of winners ==
- 2002: Henri Castelli
- 2006/2001: Reynaldo Gianecchini
- 2008: Di Ferrero
- 2009: Rodrigo Hilbert
- 2010/2013: Caio Castro
- 2011: Chay Suede
- 2012: Arthur Aguiar
- 2014: Ian Somerhalder
