= Charmes =

Charmes may refer to the following places in France:

- Charmes, Aisne, a commune in the department of Aisne
- Charmes, Allier, a commune in the department of Allier
- Charmes, Côte-d'Or, a commune in the department of Côte-d'Or
- Charmes, Haute-Marne, a commune in the department of Haute-Marne
- Charmes, Vosges, a commune in the department of Vosges
- Charmes-en-l'Angle, a commune in the department of Haute-Marne
- Charmes-la-Côte, a commune in the department of Meurthe-et-Moselle
- Charmes-la-Grande, a commune in the department of Haute-Marne
- Charmes-Saint-Valbert, a commune in the department of Haute-Saône
- Charmes-sur-l'Herbasse, a commune in the department of Drôme
- Charmes-sur-Rhône, a commune in the department of Ardèche
- Charmes-Chambertin, a grand cru vineyard in the department of Côte-d'Or

== See also ==
- Charme (disambiguation)
