= Brisa Beach Party =

Music festival in Porto, Portugal

Beach Party by Nova Era
- Genre: EDM
- Locations: Matosinhos, Porto, Portugal
- Years active: 2007–2024
- Website: www.radionovaera.pt/beach-party/line-up

Beach Party by Nova Era (Previously named Nova Era Beach Party, Galp Beach Party and Brisa Beach Party) was an electronic dance music event held annually in Praia do Aterro, Matosinhos, Porto by the Nova Era radio station. It has brought a multitude of world class DJs like Tiesto, Bob Sinclar, Erick Morillo, Swedish House Mafia, David Guetta, Alesso, Avicii, Swanky Tunes, Martin Solveig, Dimitri Vegas & Like Mike, Nicky Romero, Afrojack, Martin Garrix and Hardwell among other great DJs. It was recognized as the biggest beach party in the world.

== Events ==
=== 2007 ===
19 July	Bob Sinclar; Gary “Nesta” Pine & Dollarman
20 July	Expensive Soul; MC Marcinho; Mercado Negro
21 July	Yves Larock; Maxmen Official Party

=== 2008 ===
24 July	Tiesto; Diego Miranda
25 July	Bob Sinclar; Big Ali; Mr V; Sexy Sound Sistem
26 July	2 Many DJs; Funk You 2

=== 2009 ===
25 July	Bob Sinclar; Erick Morillo; Groove Armada; Pete Tha Zouk; Kaskade; Chris Kaeser; Sexy Sound System; Miguel Psi

=== 2010 ===
24 July	Tiesto; Swedish House Mafia; 2 Many Djs; Funk You 2

=== 2011 ===
22 July	David Guetta; Sebastian Ingrosso; Alesso; Crazy White Boy; Sexy Sound System

=== 2012 ===
14 July	Avicii; Martin Solveig; Swanky Tunes; Out Work; Southside House Collective

=== 2013 ===
6 July	Axwell; Dimitri Vegas & Like Mike; Pete Tha Zouk; DJ Ride; Plastik Funk; No id

=== 2014 ===
6 July	Dimitri Vegas & Like Mike; Showtek; NERVO; Dannic; KURA; Thomas Gold; John Steven

=== 2015 ===
From 2015 onwards, the festival switched to a 2-day event.

3 July	Dimitri Vegas & Like Mike; Ummet Ozcan; Yellow Claw; Dyro; Third Party; VINAI
4 July	Steve Angello; R3hab; DVBBS; Sunnery James & Ryan Marciano; AN21; Club Banditz

=== 2016 ===
1 July	Nicky Romero; Blasterjaxx; Yellow Claw; KURA; JAUZ; Vicetone; DJ Overule
2 July	Afrojack; W&W; Laidback Luke; Headhunterz; Dimitri Vangelis & Wyman; Wiwek; Karetus

=== 2017 ===
30 June	Martin Garrix; Carnage; Matisse & Sadko; Tony Junior; Moksi; Karetus; Carlos Manaça
1 July	Hardwell; KSHMR; Bassjackers; Mat Zo; Kris Kross Amsterdam; Dante Klein; KEVU; Miss Sheila

=== 2018 ===
29 June	Dimitri Vegas & Like Mike; Carnage; Sam Feldt; Valentino Khan; Martin Jensen; Pedro Cazanova; Still Young; MATTN
30 June	Steve Aoki; Timmy Trumpet; DubVision; Kayzo; Pegboard Nerds; LNY TNZ; Club Banditz

=== 2019 ===
28 June	Da Tweekaz; Timmy Trumpet; Vini Vici; Lucas & Steve; Cat Dealers; Maurice West; Mandragora; Manaça b2b Sheila; KEWX
29 June	Wildstylez; Marshmello; Quintino; Salvatore Ganacci; Karetus; Sigma; DJ Nano; KEVU b2b Vendark; FreakJ
