= Chris Leão =

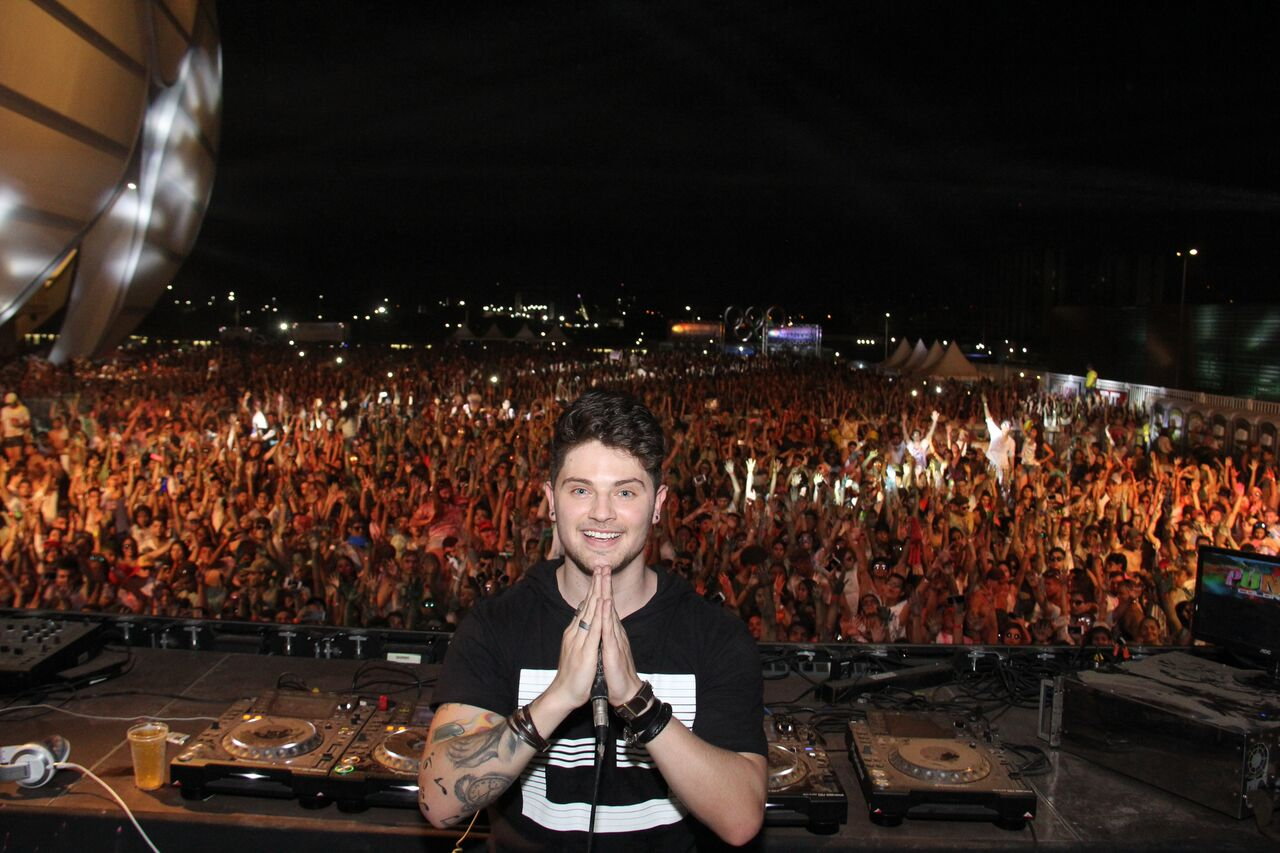
- Chris Leão live in Manaus 2016
- Born: Christian Bruno Leão da Rocha; 20 April 1994 (age 32); Porto Alegre, Brazil
- Occupations: DJ, music producer
- Years active: 2011
- Television: Colírio da Capricho da MTV Brasil, Prêmio Jovem Brasilero Multishow
- Height: 1.75 m (5 ft 9 in)
- Musical career
- Genres: Brazilian Bass
- Instrument: Digital audio workstation
- Website: chrisleao.com

Christian Bruno Leão da Rocha, known only as Chris Leão (born 20 April 1994), is a Brazilian reality television, DJ and musical producer. He became known in 2011 for winning the reality show Eye drops Capricho MTV Brasil. in 2013 he entered the world of music as a DJ with the song "On And On".

== Biography and career ==
Chris Leão was expressively known when he took part and won the reality show Eye drops Capricho on MTV Brasil 2011, with over 2 million votes. After winning the reality show, Chris became a teen phenomenon and made the cover of several Brazilian magazines, including Capricho Editora Abril.

Chris Leão, also trained as an actor, already made appearances in series and sitcoms.

Passionate about music since childhood, in late 2014, he became a professional DJ. Chris Leão received the Brazilian DJ Favorite Award at the Brazilian Youth Award ( PJB), broadcast live on Multishow. His first music track (From Here To The World) has reached over 300,000 plays on the Internet and is already being played in Brazil's big festivals. Chris Leão has worked in major festivals and music in their studio productions. At only 22 years, he was already outstanding, gaining respect in the electronic music scene. Chris Leão is a hit on social networks and has accumulated millions of followers on the Internet. It is formed by the International Academy of Electronic Music (AIMEC). Chris helped Mathix (Matheus Soares) expand fans and performed together.

== Indications and awards ==
Year	Premium	Category	Ranking	Result	Ref.
2017	House MAG	TOP 50 DJS	44	Won	
2015	Prêmio Jovem Brasileiro	DJ Brazilian Favorite	-	Won	
2011	Colírio Capricho MTV Brasil	Colírio	1	Won	
2011	Capricho Awards	Capricho Awards de Gato Nacional	-	Nominated	

== Discography ==
=== Singles and albums ===
- "The Bad Touch - Single", Chris Leão & Allexis, 2017
- "Why Can't You - Single", Chris Leão, 2017
- "Taska Fuego - Single", Chris Leão & Geminix, 2017
- "Black Pearl - Single", Chris Leão & Kary, 2016
- "On and On - Single", Chris Leão & Ferrero, 2016
- "From Here to the World - Single", Chris Leão, 2015
- "System Shock - Single", Chris Leão & Bing Man, 2016
- "Pingdown - Single", Chris Leão & Thales, 2016
- "Burst - Single", Chris Leão & Davlis, 2016

=== Remixes ===
- "Why Can't You", Mathix Remix, 2017
- "Claudia Leitte - Taquitá", Chris Leão & Geminix Remix, 2017
- "Fifth Harmony - Boss", Remix Chris Leão, 2015
- "Demi Lovato - Cool For The Summer", Remix Chris Leão, 2015

== Filmography ==
=== Television ===
Year		Grades	Channel
2011	Colírio da Capricho	Colirio	MTV Brasil
2015	Prêmio Jovem Brasileiro	Premiação	Multishow
