= Condomínio Penthouse =

Apartment in São Paulo

Condomínio Edifício Penthouse
- Penthouse Building and Paraisópolis in 2004
- Interactive map of the Condomínio Edifício Penthouse area

General information
- Status: Completed
- Type: Residential
- Location: Avenida Giovanni Gronchi, 3891, Vila Andrade, São Paulo, Brazil
- Coordinates: 23°36′51″S 46°43′51″W
- Completed: 1979

Technical details
- Floor count: 13

Design and construction
- Developer: Construtora Lindenberg

Condomínio Penthouse is a residential high-rise building located in the Vila Andrade neighborhood of São Paulo, Brazil. Inaugurated in 1979 by the Lindenberg construction company, the building is known for its luxurious apartments with spiral private pools on the balconies. It stands out for its stark contrast with the nearby Paraisópolis community, making it a notable symbol of social issues in Brazil.

== History ==
The Condomínio Penthouse was designed as a high-end residential development, with 13 units — one apartment per floor and a two-story penthouse. Each unit has approximately 355 m² (3,820 sq ft), featuring large balconies with private swimming pools, which was an architectural innovation at the time. Its spiral-shaped structure make all units like a penthouse apartment.

The building is located next to Paraisópolis, one of São Paulo’s largest favelas. Photos of the apartment and its surroundings, including one taken by pt:Tuca Vieira in 2012 for the newspaper Folha de S. Paulo are continually reproduced in books, magazines and educational material as a symbol of inequality. Vieiria's picture was on the posters, invitations, leaflets, and postcards of the exhibition Global Cities, in 2007 at the Tate Modern.

The Penthouse Building has faced poor condominium management, resident debt, and unpaid property taxes (IPTU). Some units were eventually auctioned off below market value.

== In popular culture ==
The building was an exterior filming location for the Brazilian soap opera A Próxima Vítima, broadcast by TV Globo in 1995. In the show, the character Helena, played by Natália do Vale, lived in the Penthouse. The building appeared in the opening scene of the 2025 remake of Vale Tudo.

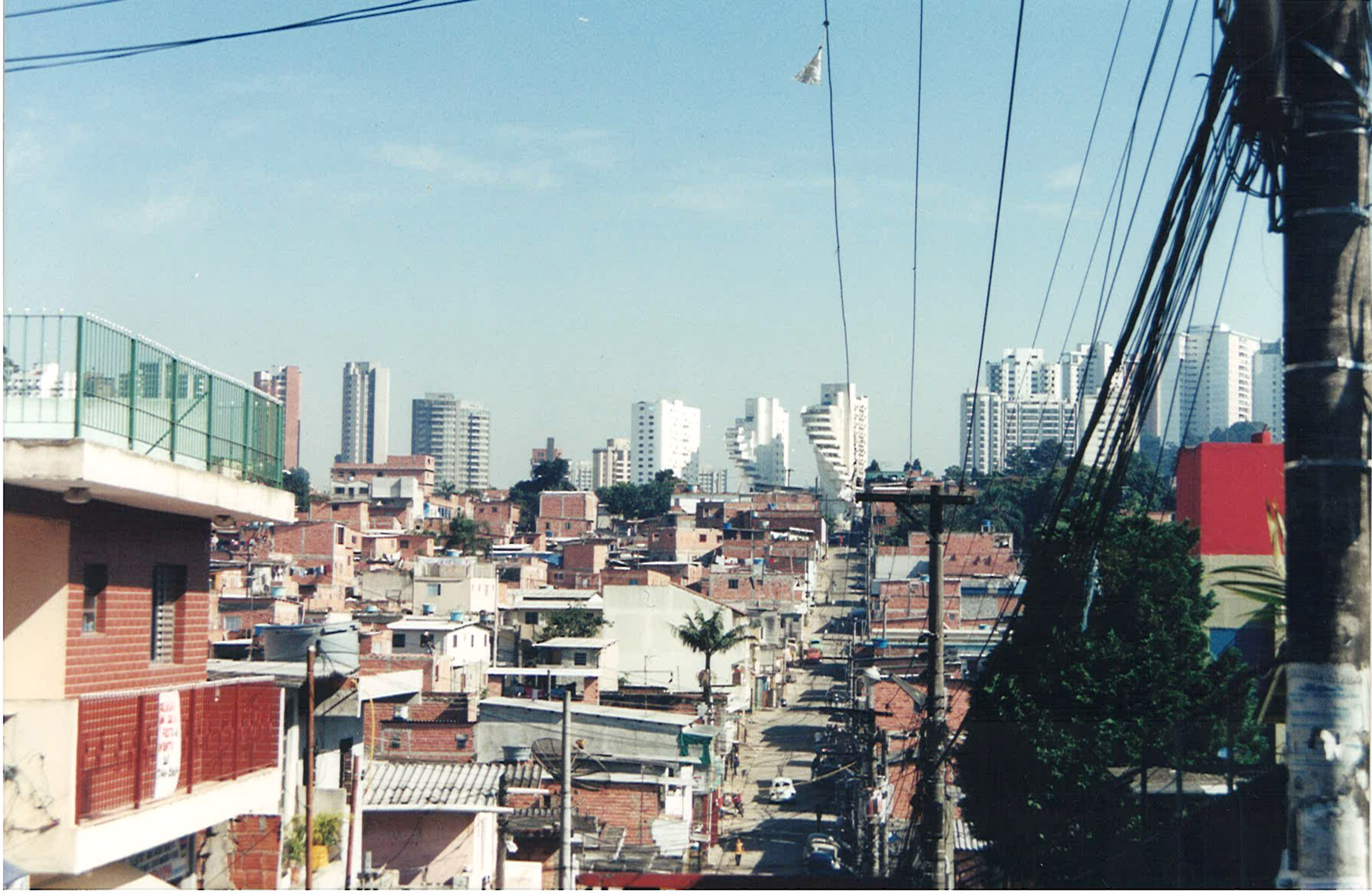
View of Condomínio Penthouse from Rudolf Lotze Street, Paraisópolis.

== See also ==
- Spatial justice
