= Heliópolis =

Informal settlement in São Paulo, Brazil

Coordinates: 23°36′38″S 46°35′33″W

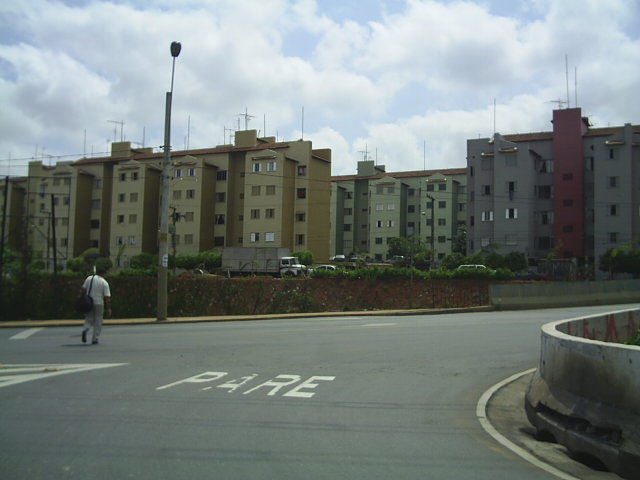
Housing estates in the neighbourhood, seen in São Caetano do Sul.

Heliópolis is a favela in the Sacomã district of São Paulo. It has around 200,000 inhabitants and has developed into a serviced neighbourhood from its beginnings as a squatted settlement in the 1970s.

== Geography ==
Heliopolis had about 120,000 inhabitants in 2007 and 200,000 in 2018. Its area covers 1.2 km^{2}. This makes it the largest slum population in the city, but the second in area behind Paraisópolis. Once considered the largest favela in Brazil, through a process of urbanization Heliopolis today has the status of a neighborhood.

The neighborhood abouts the city of São Caetano do Sul and a creek, but due to the conurbation process these limits are not noticeable. On the banks of the creek there are electricity towers and undergrowth, representing the only green area on the border between São Paulo and São Caetano do Sul, since the other border is Avenida do Estado, a densely urbanized avenue bordering both margins of Tamanduateí River.

== History ==
Heliópolis began as a series of vacant lots and a few homes of factory workers, but from the 1960s and 1970s onwards there was a large land invasion. The informal settlement was built illegally, then was consolidated and turned into a neighborhood.

In the area housing estates were built and CDHU COHAB replaced degraded horizontal buildings, although there are still several tracts in this condition. The dirt roads were replaced by asphalt, and thus consolidated in structure.

In March 2008, international delegations visited the urbanization works in Heliopolis to study urban design and model the use of public space. Delegations were present from Lagos (Nigeria), La Paz (Bolivia), Cairo (Egypt), Manila (Philippines) and Ekurhuleni (South Africa).

== Development ==
Since 1992, Community Radio Heliopolis, a community radio station whose operation was authorized by the Ministry of Communications in 2008, broadcasts in the neighborhood. Between 1992 and 1997, the station's programming was transmitted by horns hung on poles at central points of the neighborhood.

Foreign volunteer workers help with sex education, Aids prevention, recycling of waste and teaching courses.

In the 2010s, Heliópolis now has connections to the grid for sewage, water and electricity. The district has already received WiFi, which makes it possible for the residents to use the Internet.

== Gallery ==
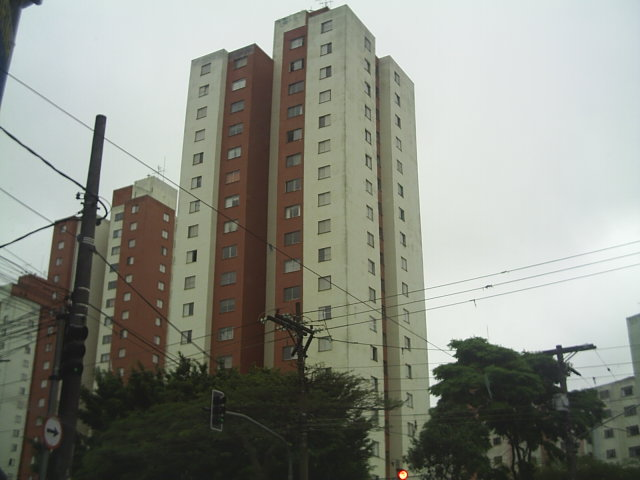
High rise building, 2008

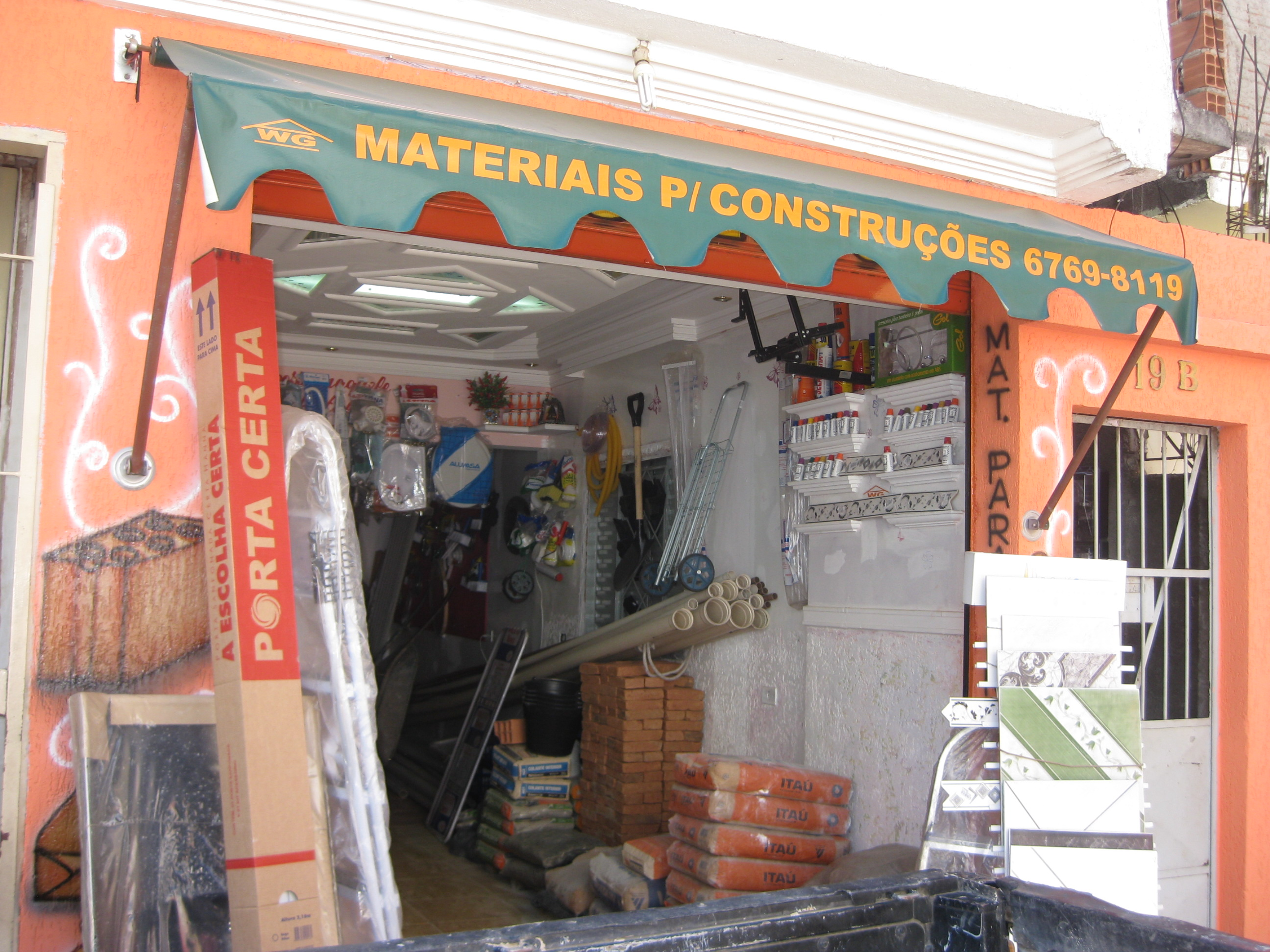
Shop, 2012

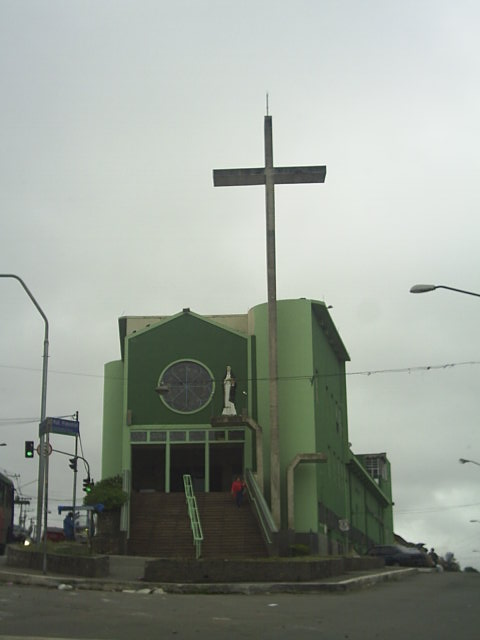
Church, 2008

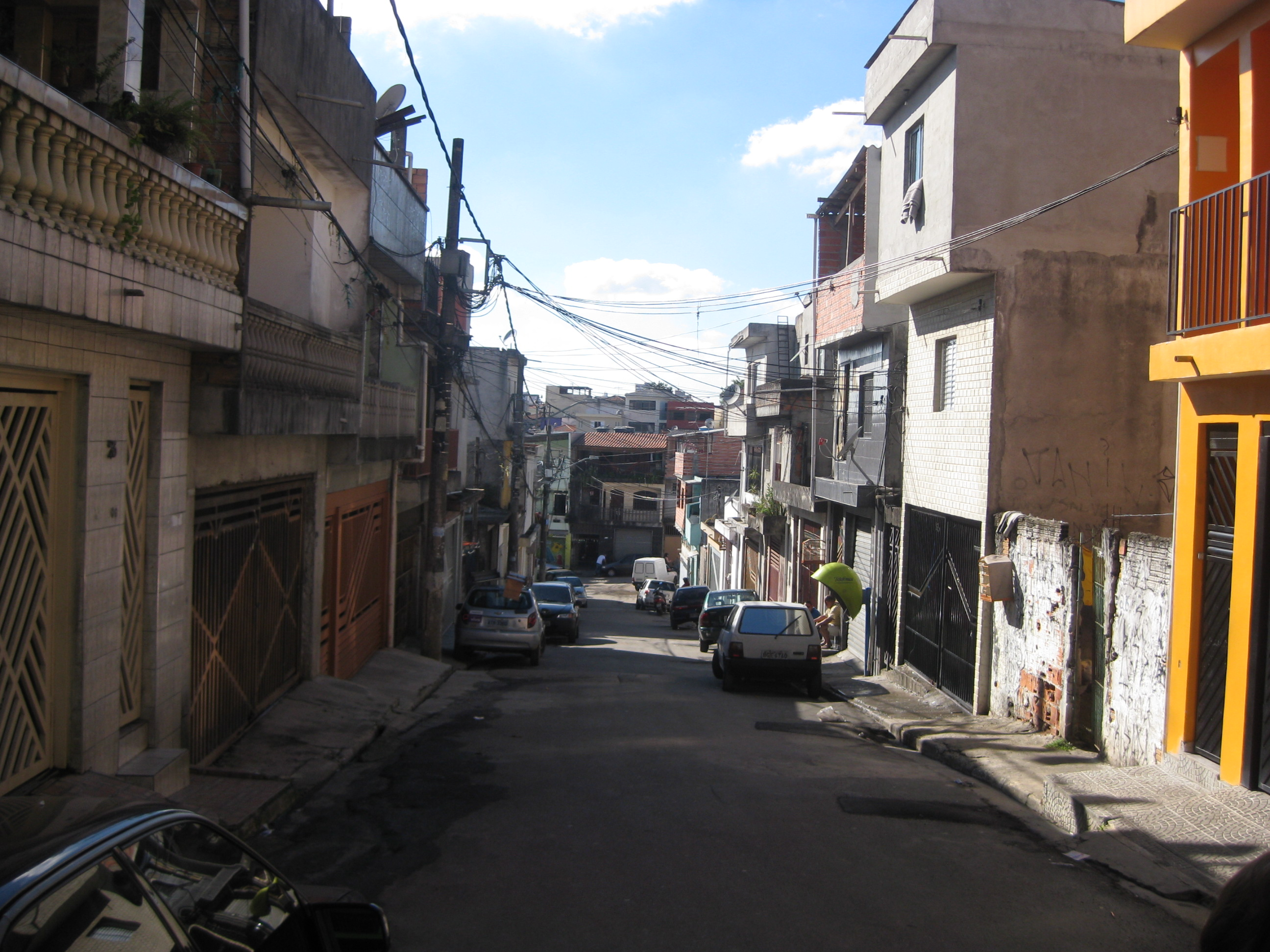
Street, 2012

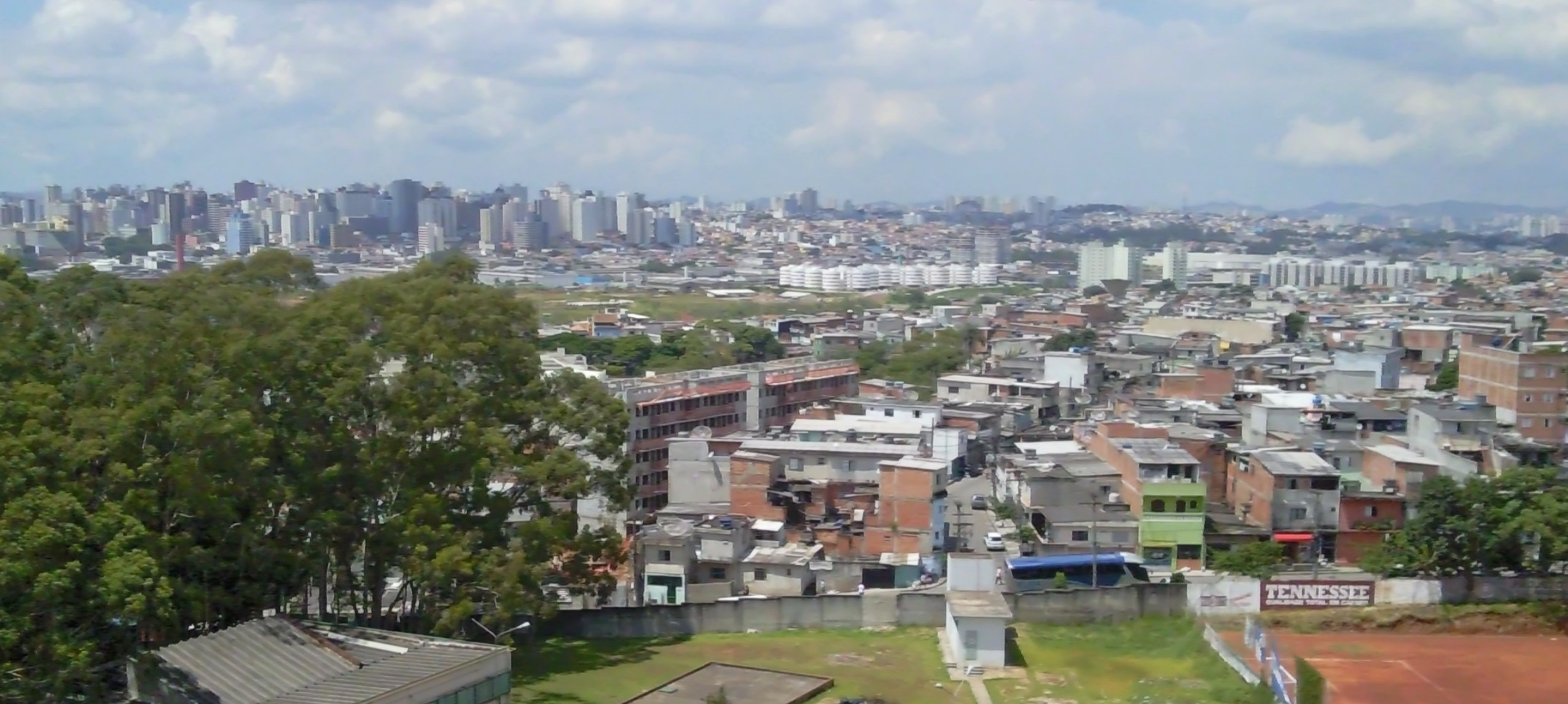
View of district, 2012
