= Charme (dance) =

Brazilian street dance style

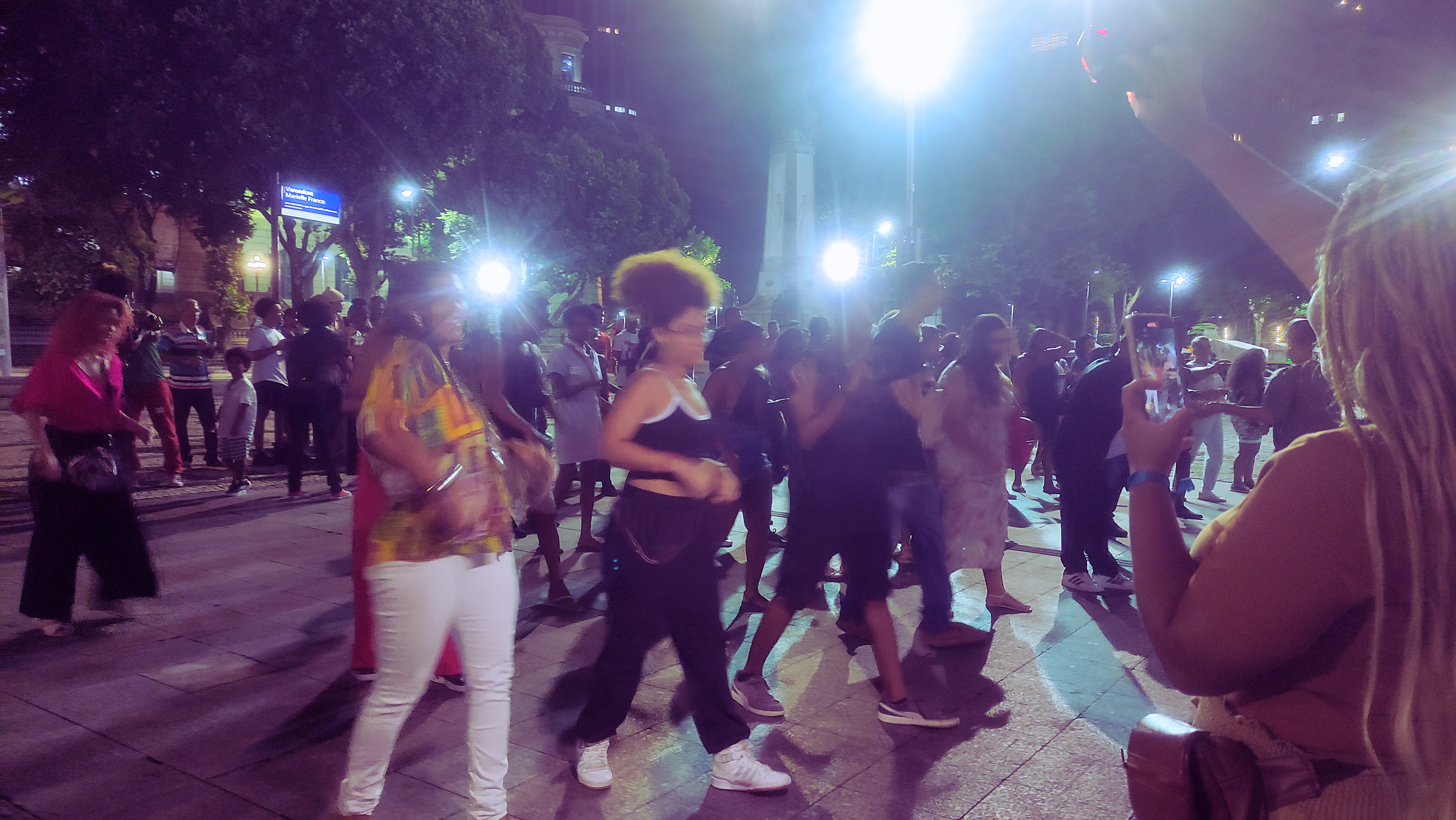
Example of charme party

Charme is a street dance style that originated in Brazil in the early 1980s. Like baile funk, baile charme evolved from the so-called bailes black (Black parties), popular in the 1970s, which featured soul, funk, and R&B music. The press dubbed it the Movimento Black Rio (Black Rio Movement). In the 1980s, during the post-disco era, this scene began to branch into two distinct party styles: baile charme and baile funk. Baile charme embraced smoother rhythms, drawing from contemporary R&B, often highlighting love songs and soulful melodies — which inspired the name "charme." In contrast, baile funk leaned into high-energy beats, influenced by Miami Bass and freestyle, creating a fast-paced environment centered around dance. This split reflected a broader evolution in Brazilian urban music and nightlife culture. The term charme is used not only to describe the parties themselves, but also as a broader label for the musical styles played at these events.
