= Furacão 2000 =

Brazilian record label

Furacão 2000 is a Rio de Janeiro-based production company and record label. It produces collections and shows of funk carioca, a variation of Miami Bass, and was principally responsible for promoting and popularizing the genre throughout Brazil in the 1990s.

== History ==
The production company originated from the 1970s merger of two sound teams: Som 2000, owned by Rômulo Costa, and Guarani 2000, owned by Gilberto Guarani. Initially, they organized soul, funk, and disco dances.

== Released albums ==
- 27 Anos Nacional
- 28 Anos Nacional - O...
- 30 Anos Nacional
- 30 Anos Nacional - Vol. 2
- Caravana da Verônica Costa
- Gigante I
- Gigante II
- Furacão Mania
- O Som das Popozudas
- Pancadão Techno Funk
- Pior que o bicho papão
- Priscila Nocetti apresenta as 14 + da Furacão 2000
- The Best of Furacão 2000
- The Best of Furacão 2000 - Vol. 2
- Furacão 2000 - Tornado Muito Nervoso
- Furacão 2000 - Tornado Muito Nervoso 2
- Furacão 2000 - Tornado Muito Nervoso 3
- Furacão 2000 Twister
- Twister Techno Funk
- DVD Furacão 2000 Twister: Só Pra Esculachar
- Furacão As Antigas
- Clássicos do Funk
- Menor do Chapa
- 2006 - Tsunami I
- 2007 - Tsunami II
- 2008 - Top Furacão 2000
- 2008 - Tsunami III
- 2009 - Clima dos bailes
- 2009 - Tsunami IV
- 2010 - Armageddon
- 2011 - Armageddon II
- 2012 - Armageddon III
- 2013 - Infinity Poder
- 2014 - Funk de verdade
