= Soul Grand Prix =

Soul Grand Prix was a Brazilian soul music group. It formed from musicians at Clube Renascença in Rio de Janeiro, including Dom Filó and his associates. The group soon initiated a new phase in Rio de Janeiro funk culture in 1975, which celebrated Blackness and Black culture. This period came to be known as Black Rio in the media.

Soul Grand Prix echoed the sounds of James Brown, Kool and the Gang and Wilson Pickett. In order to have large dances, Soul Grand Prix would put together large sound systems, sometimes using over a hundred speakers and generating crowds of over ten thousand of Brazil's youth. Soul Grand Prix dances used mixed media, films, photos, and posters to inculcate the "Black is beautiful" style period. The group sometimes censored their own visual presentations however, to avoid offending white viewers. In the middle of the 1970s, the Brazilian secret police began to associate soul with underground leftist movements and infiltrated a soul dance held by Soul Grand Prix together with Black Power. Dom Filó and his cousin "Nirto" were later incarcerated.

Black Rio influenced the funkeiro culture in Brazil who still today host parties to dance to today's funk and sample music from the past to create modernized music.
