= Daniel Haaksman =

- Born: 1968 (age 57–58)
- Origin: Germany
- Occupations: DJ, producer, journalist, label boss
- Labels: Man Recordings
- Website: danielhaaksman.com

Daniel Haaksman (born 1968) is a Berlin-based German DJ, producer, journalist and label boss. He showed the music of the favelas of Rio de Janeiro to an international audience for the first time when he released the compilation album Rio Baile Funk Favela Booty Beats in 2004. His song "Kid Conga" with MC Miltinho is included in the 2008 video game Grand Theft Auto IV, in the expansion Episodes from Liberty City.

In 2005 Haaksman founded the Man Recordings label. He has released several EPs, studio albums as well as remixes. As a DJ he has travelled around the world and performed at various night clubs, festivals and events.

From 2013 until 2016 Haaksman hosted a weekly radio show, Luso FM on the German radio station Funkhaus Europa, today known as COSMO. He also writes as a music journalist to various German-language newspapers.

== Discography ==
=== Studio albums ===
- 2009: Rio Baile Funk Breaks (with DJ Sandrinho and DJ Beware) (Man Recordings)
- 2011: Rambazamba (Man Recordings)
- 2012: More Rambazamba (Man Recordings)
- 2016: African Fabrics (Man Recordings)

=== Compilation albums ===
- 1999: V.A. Dub Infusions 1989–1999 (Best Seven)
- 2001: V.A. More Dub Infusions (Best Seven)
- 2004: V.A. Rio Baile Funk Favela Booty Beats (Essay Recordings)
- 2006: V.A. More Rio Baile Funk Favela Booty Beats (Essay Recordings)
- 2009: V.A. Bossa Do Morro (Universal Germany)

=== Singles and EPs ===
- 2008: "Who's Afraid of Rio?" feat. MC Jennifer (Man Recordings, Man 031)
- 2008: "Who's Afraid of Remix?" (Man Recordings, Man 033)
- 2009: "Gostoso" EP (Man Recordings, Man 039)
- 2009: "Gostoso" Remix (Man Recordings, Man 041)
- 2010: "Hands Up EP" (Man Recordings, Man 049)
- 2011: "Rap Da Silva" EP feat. Bani Silva (Man Recordings, Man 058)
- 2011: "Copabanana" EP (Man Recordings, Man 059)
- 2012: "Paragon" ft. Wildlife! (Man Recordings, Man 068)
- 2013: "Lemba" ft. Coréon Dú (Man Recordings, Man 077)
- 2013: "Lemba Remix" ft. Coréon Dú (Man Recordings, Man 079)
- 2013: "Toma Que Toma" (Man Recordings, Man 081)
- 2014: "Split Screen" ft. Dre Skull (Man Recordings, Mix Pak, Man 083)
- 2015: "Sabado" ft. Bulldozer (Man Recordings, Man 086)
- 2016: "Rename the Streets" (Man Recordings, Man 091)
- 2016: "Akabongi" ft. Spoek Mathambo (Man Recordings, Man 093)
- 2017: "Capri Fruit" EP ft. Feadz (Man Recordings)
- 2017: "Fun Fun Fun/Aná Aná Aná" (Man Recordings)
- 2017: "Remixes 2008–2017" (Man Recordings)
