= Playmaker Music =

- Parent company: Warner Music Group
- Founded: 2007
- Founder: Chadron (“Nitti”) Moore
- Distributor(s): Warner Bros. Records (US); WEA (Outside the US)
- Genre: Various
- Country of origin: US
- Official website: Official website of Playmaker Music

Playmaker Music is an American record label, founded by producer Chadron (“Nitti”) Moore in 2007. It operates through, and is distributed by, Warner Music Groups’ Warner Bros. Records.

== History ==
On April 4, 2007, Warner Bros. Records announced that it had struck up a label deal with Grammy-nominated producer Chadron (“Nitti”) Moore to launch Playmaker Music. Under the terms of the deal, WBR will market, promote, and distribute new artists that Nitti (who was previously a staff producer for So So Def Recordings), signs to the label.

== Artists ==
- Mykko Montana
- 9th Ward
- PLP (PIPELINE)
- Nicole Wray
- Hamilton Park

== See also ==
- List of record labels
