= Paraisópolis, São Paulo =

Favela in São Paulo

Coordinates: 23°37′00″S 46°43′36″W

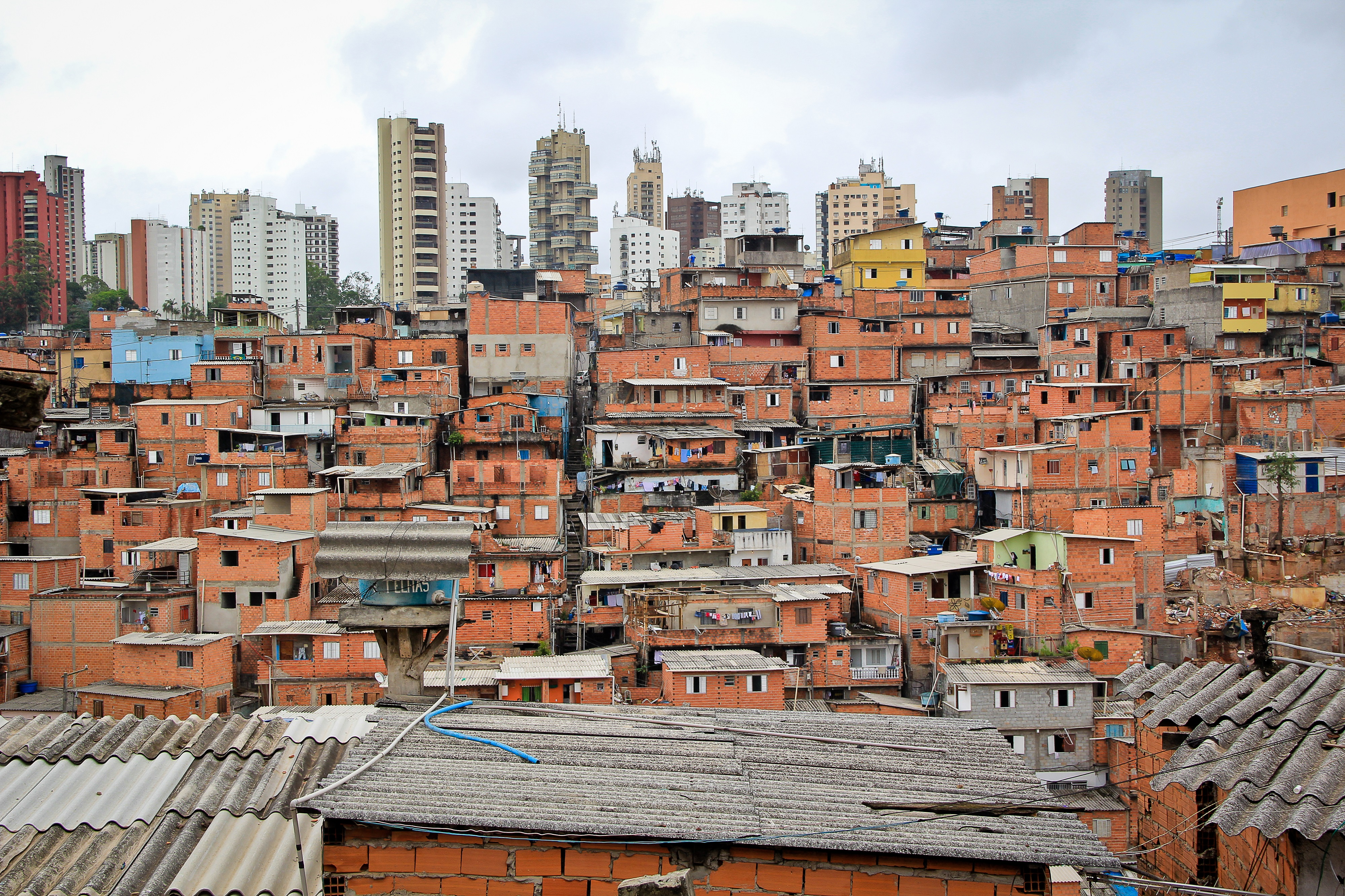
Paraisópolis, São Paulo

Paraisópolis ("Paradise city", from paraiso paradise (Portuguese) and -polis city (Greek)) is a neighborhood of São Paulo city, which is part of the Vila Andrade district, in the south zone. It is located adjacent to the affluent district of Morumbi. Paraisópolis is a favela and is the largest squatted informal settlement in the city. Unofficial estimates have suggested that Paraisópolis has a population between 60,000 and 100,000+ people. The 2022 census indicated 58,527 individuals but, as one report states, "There is inherent difficulty to measure these territories as they are extremely dynamic and, to a great extent, do not have either officially established boundaries or registered housing units."

Paraisópolis is known for a 2004 picture by photographer Tuca Vieira. It is considered one the most well-known pictures of Brazil and was taken for the Folha de S.Paulo newspaper. It highlights social inequality, both in Brazil and Latin America in general.
