= DJ Marlboro =

Brazilian DJ

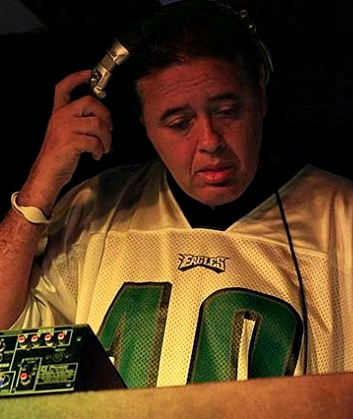
- DJ Marlboro in Brasília in 2013
- Born: Fernando Luís Mattos da Matta; January 3, 1963 (age 63); Rio de Janeiro, Brazil
- Other name: O Rei do Pancadão
- Occupation: DJ

Fernando Luiz Mattos da Matta, better known as DJ Marlboro (born January 3, 1963), is a Brazilian DJ.

== Career ==
=== Founding a genre, making albums ===
DJ Marlboro is one of the originators of the funk carioca, a crossover between electro, hip-hop, and Brazilian popular music, itself drawing heritage from African traditional music. His first LP, Funk Brasil (1989), marks the beginning of the Funk Carioca Movement, initially with versions of hip-hop and freestyle hits from American artists, especially the 2 Live Crew ("Do Wah Diddy" became "Melô da Mulher Feia" and "One and One" became "Melô dos Números"), sung in Portuguese.

He got the idea of making Portuguese versions of American songs by paying attention to how people at parties that played freestyle music in Rio de Janeiro, known as "baile funk," would create and sing their own versions of the songs, in Portuguese, as they couldn't understand English, and how they would nickname the songs as "melô do..." ("the ... song"), since the original name of the songs, in English, was too difficult for them to pronounce and memorize. The best example is his first song, "Melô da Mulher Feia" ("song of the ugly woman"), which was how patrons of the "baile funk" would call the 2 Live Crew's version of "Do Wah Diddy," as they would sing along "mulher feia chupa o ... e dá o ..." ("ugly woman sucks ... and gives ...") to the 2 Live Crew's tune. He then made a PG version of the song and recorded it, and was a smash hit on the radio, prompting him to create more songs and record his first album. Later on, Marlboro and others started writing their own songs, and he released several albums.

He used to live in a district of the Rio de Janeiro city that was very distant, nicknamed "Marlboro Country" by his peers, who started calling him "Marlboro," and the nickname stuck.

DJ Marlboro is the host and producer of the radio show "Big Mix in Rio". DJ Marlboro was introduced to a worldwide audience In 2004 when German journalist, record label owner and fellow DJ, Daniel Haaksman formed Man Recordings and recruited both DJ Marlboro and Edu-K and DJ Marlboro - creating a link between South American and European artists.

=== Views on funk ===
DJ Marlboro credits the resurgence of funk fever in Brazil to the cyclical nature of musical fads, saying in his 23 years as a DJ, he's witnessed the funk explosion several times. Brazilian bailes, well attended dance parties that played American soul, disco, and funk music, featured heavy bass sounds and light systems. DJ Marlboro's Portuguese rapping in his 1989 LP “Funk Brazil” helped introduce Portuguese music into these bailes, where the heavy bass sounds became a platform for this new sound. As a result, by the mid-1990s most of the music played by funk DJs was produced in Brazil. Currently, DJ Marlboro is the resident DJ at São Paulo's Lov.e Club.

DJ Marlboro maintains that “funk is a way of expression that was born from the common people”. To him, funk is at its best when most people are unaware of it, preventing the exploitation of artists. DJ Marlboro expresses the importance of its underlying culture by asserting that the movement need not be glorified or globally successful. He insists that funk will always continue to be played, whether the world can hear it or not. ^{5} He urges listeners to understand that it is a musical movement that has sprung from culture and a passion to tell the truth; not from the need to accept and nationalize music from other parts of the world, particularly the United States. He acknowledges that recordings are not a priority for funk artists, because the point is to go the bailes and dance.

DJ Marlboro embraces and supports the "undergroundness" of the Baile Funk scene, particularly the music played at the Bailes in Brazil. In an interview, DJ Marlboro says, "The bailes in Rio have survived such a long time because we do the bailes to please the public. We work with music that doesn't need to recognised or be successful in the rest of the world. We play tracks that are popular in the bailes full stop. We don't need media and marketing." He embraces the aspect of funk and certain artists being unknown because that keeps this genre alive in the streets, despite the resistance from the media and upperclass culture. The resistance from the upperclass and police stems from the upper class considering this music to be strictly pornographic, offensive, and sexually explicit. DJ Marlboro is a main public face trying to reverse that opinion and have the people look deeper into the true origins and messages of the music. As stated in an interview with DJ Marlboro in 2003, "Chuck D refers to rap as the black CNN. In many respects Rio or baile funk could be referred to as favela CNN. That is, it's used as a medium to convey how the people who live in the Brazilian favelas really feel using their own language, idioms and slang." This helps empower these artists, and while they may not gain national acclaim, they get the respect of their fans for delivering both a real sound and message. This is also seen through the lack of major record deals in the world of funk music.

He knows first hand the hardships of being a funk artist, in a separate interview he says, "We suffer a lot of persecution. At one recent baile, the police came in and shut it down... My sound systems have bullet holes in them from police attacks.” DJ Marlboro has transcended this situation, however, as he has now become international and has teamed up with recognized artists such as M.I.A. Through these various collaborations, DJ Marlboro has played a significant role in increasing the popularity of funk carioca not only within Brazil, but at the global level as well. In fact, he has been one of the main players in taking funk abroad, playing shows throughout Europe (Britain, Germany, France), The United States, and even China. Marlboro's sets have been in demand in some of the major electronic festivals in the world, festivals such as Sonar in Spain, Brasil 40 Degrees in London, Summer Stage Central Park in New York, Tim Festival in Rio, Sonarsound in São Paulo and Elektronika in Belo Horizonte.

According to an interview with DJ Marlboro in 2003, "DJ Marlboro believes in which keeping funk discreet to the public, may reduce the amount of exploitation within the genre. "The best time for funk is when people don't know about it, for those of us who are funkateers that is". In relation to the exploitation of Funk, he mentioned that people view funk as "an image of women with big butts, you never see the many sides to funk, so people look and they think that funk is pornographic, funk is violent... but funk is all of this, it's violent, romantic, and playful." He embraces the baile funk scene in Rio, because he enjoys pleasing the public. It is assumed that individuals that are new to Funk genre just assume that Baile Funk is just associated with pornographic notions. According to an article on Rio Baile Funk: Favela Booty beats, "Baile funk is nothing like that. This is raw, bare-bones, hooky but proudly unmelodic stuff, recorded on the cheap with 808 drum machines, early samplers, and dusty computers. Rio Baile Funk sounds--and feels, really--like a revelation".

== Personal life ==
In 2009, DJ Marlboro was under investigation for pedophilia. The criminal investigation was launched in Rio de Janeiro, Brazil, after claims were made that DJ Marlboro had allegedly abused a four-year-old girl. The investigation concluded without charges being filed.
