= Funk melody =

Genre of Brazilian funk

- Stylistic origins: Funk carioca; Latin freestyle; dance-pop
- Cultural origins: 1990s, Rio de Janeiro, Brazil
- Typical instruments: Drum machine; turntable; sampler; synthesizer; vocals

Funk melody (Brazilian Portuguese: [ˈfɐ̃k(i) ˈmɛlodʒi]) is a fusion genre of funk carioca and Latin freestyle.

== History ==
DJ Marlboro's radio show "Big Mix", broadcast since the 80s, has popularised a soft version of the underground funk carioca songs. These soft versions formed a romantic subgenre called melodic funk in Brazil, adding melodies and arrangements to the raw, beat-y funk tunes.

Anitta is one of the most important artists of funk melody in Brazil. She helped popularize the genre throughout the country and brought the musical style to other parts of the world, becoming one of the most internationally recognized Brazilian artists. Anitta was also one of the first funk melody artists to incorporate elements of other musical genres into her songs, such as pop, R&B, and hip hop, helping to modernize and evolve the musical style. Her music and urban lifestyle represent the cultural and musical movement of funk melody in Brazil, which is popular mainly among young people from impoverished communities. Her importance to funk melody is undeniable, having been one of the most influential and successful artists of the genre in recent decades.
