= BreakTudo Awards 2025 =

10th edition of the BreakTudo Awards

- Date: Tuesday, November 18, 2025; 8:00 p.m. BRT
- Venue: São Paulo, São Paulo
- Country: Brazil
- Hosted by: Emanuela Nogueira, Gerf Barone, Ryan Berger

Highlights
- Most awards: Anitta, Gustavo Mioto, Felca, Bini, Joelma (2)
- Most nominations: Anitta (6)
- Website: breaktudoawards.com

Television/radio coverage
- Network: Box Brazil Play; Telemilênio; Yeeaah TV; Claro TV+; Prime Video

The BreakTudo Awards 2025 were held in São Paulo, Brazil, on November 18, 2025. The ceremony was broadcast by Telemilênio, Box Brazil Play, and Yeeaah TV, and was made available for streaming via Prime Video and Claro TV+ through Box Brazil Play. It was hosted by presenters and journalists Emanuela Nogueira and Gerf Barone, along with singer Ryan Berger.

The event honored achievements in music, television, and digital content creation. Anitta led the nominations with six and won two awards, including the Brazilian Music Video Award for “Romeo.” Other artists receiving two awards each included Bini, Gustavo Mioto, Joelma, Felca, and FreenBecky. The band Jota Quest received the Brazilian Pop Icon award.

== Performances ==
List of performers at the BreakTudo Awards 2025
| Artist(s) | Song(s) |
|---|---|
| BGYO | "All These Ladies" |
| Júlia Rezende | "Mundo ao Inverso" |
| Traemme | "Agora Doeu (feat.Kell Smith)" "Demônia (feat. Kaique)" |

== Winners and nominees ==
The nominations were announced on September 9, 2025. Winners are listed first and highlighted in bold.

=== Music ===
| Brazilian Female Artist | Brazilian Male Artist |
|---|---|
| **Manu Bahtidão**; Ana Castela; Anitta; Joelma; Lauana Prado; Liniker; Ludmilla; Luísa Sonza | **Gustavo Mioto**; Gloria Groove; Jão; João Gomes; Luan Santana; Pabllo Vittar; Pedro Sampaio; Veigh |
| International Female Artist | International Male Artist |
| **Jennie**; Ariana Grande; Charli XCX; Doechii; Lady Gaga; Miley Cyrus; Sabrina Carpenter; Tate McRae | **Jimin**; Bad Bunny; Benson Boone; Burna Boy; Ed Sheeran; Justin Bieber; Kendrick Lamar; The Weeknd |
| Brazilian Artist on the Rise | International Artist on the Rise |
| **Any Gabrielly**; Duquesa; Ebony; Hugo Henrique; João Lucas; Urias; Yago Oproprio; Zaynara | **BGYO**; Addison Rae; Ayra Starr; Damiano David; Jade; Proxie; Reneé Rapp; Zerobaseone |
| Brazilian New Artist | International New Artist |
| **Diego Martins**; Ajuliacosta; Bela Maria; Jota.pê; Léo Foguete; Lucas LM; Nilo; Talita Mel | **Katseye**; Gigi Perez; Gracie Abrams; Illit; Lola Young; LYKN; Ravyn Lenae; Sombr |
| Asian Artist | Latin Artist |
| **J-Hope**; Jackson Wang; Jeff Satur; Jisoo; Jolin; Maki; Niki; Wonho | **Cazzu**; Belinda; Danna Paola; Emilia; Karol G; Kenia Os; María Becerra; Natanael Cano |
| Global Artist | International Female Group |
| **Jung Kook**; Cardi B; Lali; Lisa; Lorde; Shenseea; Wizkid; Zara Larsson | **Bini**; 4Eve; Aespa; Babymonster; Blackpink; Flo; Itzy; Twice |
| International Male Group | Anthem of the Year |
| **Enhypen**; Ateez; Be:First; Big Time Rush; SB19; Seventeen; Stray Kids; TXT | **"Mi Ex" – Bauti Mascia and Fer Vazquez**; "Caramel" – Conan Gray; "Fast" – Demi Lovato; "Me Sabe Mal" – Juanjo Bona; "One More Song" – Ethan; "Sunset Blvd" – Selena Gomez and Benny Blanco; "Unethical" – Faouzia; "When We Kiss" – Olly Alexander |
| Best Pop Release | Best Sertanejo Release |
| **"Carta Marcada" – Vitor Kley**; "Agora Doeu" – Traemme and Kell Smith; "Automotivo Amar" – Bibi Babydoll, Dj Brunin XM, and MC Erikah; "Coisas Naturais" – Marina Sena; "Falo Demais" – Lucas Pretti; "não era amor, foi só tesão" – Bruno Gadiol and Clau; "Sobre Nós" – Junior; "Um Milhão (Ao Vivo)" – Lary | **"Tailândia" – Luiza Martins**; "Arruma Um Bão" – Israel & Rodolffo; "Olha Onde Eu Tô" – Ana Castela; "Paixão De Mulher" – Paula Fernandes; "Parece" – Luan Santana; "Princesa" – Gustavo Mioto and Ana Castela; "Saudade Proibida" – Simone Mendes; "Vai Lá" – Maiara & Maraisa |
| Brazilian Collaboration of the Year | International Collaboration of the Year |
| **"Passe de Mágica" – Joelma and João Gomes**; "Dona" – Luan Santana and Léo Foguete; "Errado Perfeito" – Gabi Martins and Luan Pereira; "Mal" – Jão and Gustavo Mioto; "Que Pecado!" – Carol Biazin and Ebony; "Risca Faca" – Juliette and Michele Andrade; "Sei Que Tu Me Odeia" – Anitta, Mc Danny, and Hitmaker; "Seus Recados" – Ivete Sangalo and Liniker | **"Blink Twice (Dos Veces Remix)" – Bini and Belinda**; "Born Again" – Lisa, Doja Cat, and Raye; "Carita Triste" – Ana Mena and Emilia; "Gimme Dat" – Ayra Starr and Wizkid; "I'm His, He's Mine" – Katy Perry and Doechii; "Mexe" – Pabllo Vittar and Nmixx; "São Paulo" – The Weeknd and Anitta; "Shake It To The Max (Fly) (Remix)" – Moliy, Shenseea, Skillibeng, and Silent Addy |
| Brazilian Hit of the Year | International Hit of the Year |
| **"Nada Com Nada" – Gustavo Mioto and Menos É Mais**; "Artista Genérico" – Veigh; "Clone" – Luan Santana; "Cópia Proibida" – Léo Foguete; "Eu Vou Na Sua Casa" – Felipe Amorim, Bin, Vitão, and Malibu; "Melzinho" – Talita Mel and Xand Avião; "Página de Ex" – Mari Fernandez; "Saudade Burra" – Lauana Prado and Simone Mendes | **"Don't Say You Love Me" – Jin**; "Anxiety" – Doechii; "APT." – Rosé and Bruno Mars; "Gabriela" – Katseye; "I Love You, I'm Sorry" – Gracie Abrams; "Like Jennie" – Jennie; "Not Like Us" – Kendrick Lamar; "Sports Car" – Tate McRae |
| Latin Hit of the Year | K-pop Hit of the Year |
| **"Alegría" – Tiago PZK, Anitta, and Emilia**; "Baile Inolvidable" – Bad Bunny; "¿Cómo Pasó?" – Ela Taubert and Joe Jonas; "Mejor Que Vos" – Lali and Miranda!; "Motinha 2.0 Remix" – Dennis, Luísa Sonza, and Emilia; "Ojos Tristes" – Selena Gomez, Benny Blanco, and the Marías; "Universidad" – Tini and Beéle; "Verano Rosa" – Karol G and Feid | **"Girls Will Be Girls" – Itzy**; "Beautiful Strangers" – TXT; "Chk Chk Boom" – Stray Kids; "Dirty Work" – Aespa; "Drip" – Babymonster; "Golden" – Huntrix (Ejae, Audrey Nuna, and Rei Ami); "Nice Guy" – BoyNextDoor; "Rebel Heart" – Ive |
| Song by New Brazilian Artist | Song by New International Artist |
| **"Euforia" – Unna X**; "Ainda Bem Que Deu Errado" – Marcela; "Alô Polícia" – QuatroK; "Checkpoint" – Wenny; "Continue" – Bruna Black; "Dois Carentes" – Fiorella and Enzo Ferro; "Diva do Interior" – Monik; "O Assunto" – Mariasss | **"COLD" – Hori7on**; "Bye" – Midnight 'Til Morning; "Clang Clang" – DEXX; "If It Was Me" – Siren Society; "Rage" – K4OS; "Take It Off" – JASP.ER; "Tibio" – Mar Rendón; "Yaşanacaksa" – Manifest |
| Brazilian Music Video | International Music Video |
| **"Romeo" – Anitta**; "Banquete" – Vivi; "É Arte" – Lexa and Kevin O Chris; "Infiel" – João Ferreira and Lucas LM; "Meninos e Meninas F.C." – Jão; "Não Para' – MC Daniel and Ludmilla; "Nossa Chance" – Duda Beat and TZ da Coronel; "Sinais" – Lou Garcia | **"Grit" – Be:First**; "Abracadabra" – Lady Gaga; "Bliss" – Tyla; "Dam" – SB19; "Jump" – Blackpink; "Lovin Myself" – Ava Max; "Messiah" – Sevdaliza; "The Subway" – Chappell Roan |
Independent Artist Release
**"Amor Próprio" – Carol Lyne**; "Cadela" – Maria Miranda; "Calor Latino" – KAKO; "Fantasia" – Davi Bandeira; "Não te falta nada" – Pedro Bienemann; "Pacto" – Bea Duarte; "Perfume" – Kaya Conky and Urias; "Segredo Clichê" – Giana

=== Television ===
| Fictional Ship | Brazilian TV Series |
|---|---|
| **Magi – Xeque Mate – NatáliaSofia**; Ai-oonMay – Pluto Series – NamFilm; CharlieBabe – PitBabe 2 – PoohPavel; CharanKhanin – The Next Prince – ZeeNunew; PamDokrak – US – EmiBonnie; RealHia – Your Sky – AuauSave; ThamePo – ThamePo The Series – WilliamEst; YothaGun – Perfect 10 Liners – PerthSanta | **Senna – Netflix**; Amor da Minha Vida – Disney+; Cidade de Deus: A Luta Não Para – HBO Max; DNA do Crime – Netflix; Maria e o Cangaço – Disney+; Os Quatro da Candelária – Netflix; Sutura – Prime Video; Vidas Bandidas – Netflix |
| International TV Series | BL Series of the Year |
| **Weak Hero Class 2 – Netflix**; Adolescence – Netflix; The Wheel of Time – Prime Video; Heartstopper – Netflix; Love In The Big City – TVING; Olympo – Netflix; Ruptura – Apple TV+; Sandman – Netflix | **Top Form – WeTV**; Ball Boy Tactics – iQIYI; Gelboys – iQIYI; Jack & Joker – iQIYI; Perfect 10 Liners – GMMTV; Reset – iQIYI; Revenged Love – Viki; The Time of Fever – iQIYI |
| GL Series of the Year | Best Reality Star |
| **The Loyal Pin – IdolFactory**; Ayaka is in Love with Hiroko – MBS; Denied Love – WeTV; Harmony Secret – iQIYI; Pluto – GMMTV; Reverse With Me – iQIYI; US – GMMTV; Whale Store xoxo – GMMTV | **Zeudi Di Palma – Grande Fratello 18**; Chiara Mancuso – Gran Hermano; Diego Hypólito – BBB 25; Guilherme Vilar – BBB 25; Renata Saldanha – BBB 25; Tato Algorta – Gran Hermano; Ulises Apostolo – Gran Hermano; Vitória Strada – BBB 25 |
| Brazilian Actress | Brazilian Actor |
| **Juliana Paes – Vidas Bandidas**; Bruna Marquezine – Amor da Minha Vida; Clara Moneke – Dona de Mim; Fernanda Torres – Ainda Estou Aqui; Larissa Manoela – Êta Mundo Melhor!; Letícia Colin – Os Outros; Maísa – Garota do Momento; Taís Araújo – Vale Tudo | **Juan Paiva – Dona de Mim**; Alexandre Rodrigues – Cidade de Deus: A Luta Não Para; Gabriel Leone – Senna; Jesuíta Barbosa – Homem Com H; Pedro Novaes – Garota do Momento; Renato Góes – Vale Tudo; Rodrigo Simas – Vidas Bandidas; Sérgio Malheiros – Amor da Minha Vida |

=== Digital ===
| Brazilian Fandom of the Year | International Fandom of the Year |
|---|---|
| **Joelmáticos – Joelma**; Anitters – Anitta; Cactos – Juliette; CaiLu – Caio Cerqueira and Luan Alencar; Lobos – Jão; Ludmillers – Ludmilla; Straders – Vitória Strada; Vittarlovers – Pabllo Vittar | **FreenBecky – Freen Sarocha and Becky Armstrong**; Armys – BTS; BeyHive – Beyoncé; Blinks – Blackpink; Blooms – Bini; Cryboyers – Cry; Los Furiosos – Furia Scaglione; Zeudiners – Zeudi Di Palma |
| Best Creator | Rising Creator |
| **Felca**; Camila Pudim; Ciclopin; Irê Alves; Jessica Diniz; Phellyx; Rafael Santos; Uai Lázaro | **Boy Marinho**; Gabriel Ambrósio; Jotxinha; MuitoHumilde (Bruno Couto); New Crias; Palloma Tamirys; Wanessa Wolf; Zabela |
| New Creator | Digital Production of the Year |
| **Jennifer Prioli**; Baú Explica; Fernanda Ganzarolli; Francisquinho; Johnny Garcia; O Mundo de Victor Brandão; Porquinho da Paulista; Raffa3ul | **Pograma – Ciclopin, Doarda, and Sofia Santino**; Acessíveis – Titi Müller and MariMoon; Corrida das Blogueiras – Diva Depressão; De Frente Com Blogueirinha – Blogueirinha; É Nóia Minha? – Camila Fremder; Foquinha Entrevista – Foquinha; Lorelive – Lorelay Fox; PodPah – Igão and Mítico |
| Social Impact Creator | Internet Personality |
| **Felca**; Andressah Catty; Bruna Volpi; Fayda Belo; Guga Figueiredo; Jones Manoel; Senhorita Bira; Sou o William | **Priscilla Reis**; Beatriz Reis; Brino; Camila Loures; Camilla de Lucas; Elana Valenaria; Felipe Neto; Ismeiow |
| Brazilian Crush | International Crush |
| **Eva Pacheco**; Aline Patriarca; Bella Campos; João Guilherme; Lara Silva; Priscila Buiar; Sacha Bali; Sofia Santino | **Freen Sarocha**; Boom Raveewit; Jenna Ortega; Kit Connor; Nam Yoon-su; Rema; Sofia Carson; Zeudi Di Palma |

== Special awards ==
Brazilian Pop Icon
Jota Quest
