= BreakTudo Awards 2026 =

11th edition of the BreakTudo Awards

- Date: Tuesday, November 24, 2026
- Venue: São Paulo, São Paulo, Brazil
- Country: Brazil

Highlights
- Most nominations: Anitta (6)
- Website: breaktudoawards.com

Television/radio coverage
- Network: Box Brazil Play; Prime Video; Claro TV+; Telemilênio; Yeeaah TV

The BreakTudo Awards 2026 will be held in São Paulo, Brazil, on November 24, 2026. The ceremony will be broadcast by Box Brazil Play, Telemilênio and Yeeaah TV, and will be available for streaming through Prime Video and Claro TV+.

The nominees were announced on September 16, 2026. Anitta received the most nominations with six, followed by Gustavo Mioto, Marina Sena and Shakira, with four each.

== Nominations ==
The 2026 nominations include Brazilian and international artists and works across music, television, and digital media categories. Nominees are listed by category. Winners will be shown in bold once announced.

=== Music ===
Brazilian Female Artist	Brazilian Male Artist
Anitta; Gaby Amarantos; Joelma; Liniker; Ludmilla; Luísa Sonza; Manu Bahtidão; Marina Sena	Gloria Groove; Gustavo Mioto; Jão; L7nnon; Léo Foguete; Luan Santana; Pabllo Vittar; Pedro Sampaio
International Female Artist	International Male Artist
Ariana Grande; Bebe Rexha; Cardi B; Jennie; Olivia Rodrigo; Shakira; Taylor Swift; Zara Larsson	Bad Bunny; Bruno Mars; Burna Boy; Harry Styles; Justin Bieber; Sombr; The Weeknd; Wizkid
Brazilian Artist on the Rise	International Artist on the Rise
Bea Duarte; Bela Maria; Giana Mello; Isa Buzzi; Kaya Conky; KING Saints; Rachel Reis; Viviane Batidão	Cup of Joe; Dagny; Hori7on; Kehlani; LYKN; Malcolm Todd; Proxie; Slayyyter
Brazilian New Artist	International New Artist
Carol Lyne; Dupê; Giana; Henry Freitas; NandaTsunami; Traemme; Vitinho Imperador; Yasmin Sensação	Adéla; Bella Kay; Cortis; Katteyes; Manifest; Myles Smith; Olivia Dean; PinkPantheress
Latin Artist	Global Artist
Belinda; Cazzu; Karol G; Kenia Os; Ozuna; Peso Pluma; Rauw Alejandro; Tini	Arthur Nery; Ayra Starr; BamBam; Ellie Goulding; Emilia; J-Hope; Rosalía; Sabrina Carpenter
Asian Artist	International Female Group
4Eve; BGYO; Daou Pittaya; Hwasa; Lisa; Rob Deniel; Yena; Yuqi	Babymonster; Bini; Blackpink; Flo; Illit; Itzy; Katseye; Twice
International Male Group	Best Pop Release
Ateez; Be:First; BTS; Enhypen; SB19; Stray Kids; Tomorrow X Together; Zerobaseone	"Adeus" – Bea Duarte; "Aurora" – Jão; "Dark Temptation" – Lorena Simpson, Wanessa; "Egoísta" – Lucas Pretti, Johnny Hooker, Azzy; "Eu Tô Solteira" – Gaby Amarantos; "Flert3" – Mariasss; "Imagina" – Day Limns, Giana Mello; "(men)tiroso" – Unna X
Independent Artist Release	Brazilian Anthem of the Year
"Acaba Comigo" – Tinn; "Canibal" – Gabi Lins; "Codinome" – Marcela; "Custa Caro" – Igor Oggy, K4me; "Dumb Blond Bitc*s" – Barbit, Bibi Babydoll; "Peligroso" – Kako; "Quebrando a Regra" – Renan Cavolik; "Quero Dançar" – Monik	"Ainda Não Te Amo" – Thiago Pantaleão; "Como Deve Ser" – Melly; "DNA" – Gustavo Mioto; "Ladrão de Tempo" – Carol Lyne; "Manifesto" – Traemme; "Mesma Pessoa" – Joelma; "Tô Sendo Você" – Luíza Martins; "Volta Meu Amor" – Késia, Lucas Morato
International Anthem of the Year	Brazilian Collaboration of the Year
"Bittersweet" – Madison Beer; "Dance..." – Slayyyter; "Epa" – Becky G; "Forever Tonight" – BGYO; "Leak It" – Flo; "Mantra" – Keng Harit; "New Religion" – Bebe Rexha, Faithless; "Who's Dat Girl" – Ayra Starr, Rema	"Baby" – Mateus Carrilho, Dupê; "Carnaval" – Marina Sena, Psirico; "Eu e Você" – Iza, Jota.pê; "Fala Quem É" – Anitta, Marina Sena, Pabllo Vittar; "O Que Sobrou Do Amor?" – Carol Biazin, Léo Foguete; "Quem Disse Que o Amor É Bom" – Manu Bahtidão, Leo Santana; "Seu Desejo" – Seu Desejo, Luísa Sonza; "VIP" – Budah, Duquesa
International Collaboration of the Year	Brazilian Hit of the Year
"Bring Your Love" – Madonna, Sabrina Carpenter; "Emoji" – SB19, Jolin Tsai; "Eyes Closed" – Jisoo, Zayn; "Mi Chico" – DJ Goja, Jason Derulo, Melody; "Save Me Tonight" – Jennifer Lopez, David Guetta; "She Did It Again" – Tyla, Zara Larsson; "Spaghetti" – Le Sserafim, J-Hope; "Te Olvido (La La)" – Benny Blanco, Selena Gomez, Becky G	"Beijo Beija-Flor" – Léo Foguete; "Foguinho" – Gaby Amarantos; "Gostosin" – Anitta, Felipe Amorim, Hitmaker; "Jetski" – Pedro Sampaio, MC Meno K, Melody; "P.I.T.T.Y." – NandaTsunami, Stick, Torelli, Bvga Beatz; "Pedido de Socorro" – Gustavo Mioto; "Quem Sente Saudade Sou Eu" – Maiara & Maraisa; "Whiskey com Água de Choro" – Ludmilla
International Hit of the Year	Latin Hit of the Year
"Animal" – Katseye; "Dai Dai" – Shakira, Burna Boy; "Dracula (Jennie remix)" – Tame Impala, Jennie; "Folded" – Kehlani; "Stateside" – PinkPantheress, Zara Larsson; "Stupid Song" – Olivia Rodrigo; "Swim" – BTS; "The Fate of Ophelia" – Taylor Swift	"Algo Tú" – Shakira, Beéle; "Bby Wow" – Karol G, Judeline, Rusowsky; "Besito en la Frente" – Rauw Alejandro; "Choka Choka" – Anitta, Shakira; "Hasta Que Me Enamoro" – Maria Becerra, Tini, Xross; "La Perla" – Rosalía, Yahritza y su Esencia; "Pa ti toa" – Ana Mena, Lola Indigo; "Te Entiendo (Remix)" – Maisak, Feid, Maluma
K-pop Hit of the Year	Song by New Brazilian Artist
"Catch Catch" – Yena; "Good Goodbye" – Hwasa; "It's Me" – Illit; "Lemonade" – Aespa; "RedRed" – Cortis; "Stick with You" – Tomorrow X Together; "Sugar Honey Ice Tea" – Babymonster; "This & That" – Stray Kids	"Algo me trouxe aqui" – Jumorelo; "Desmoronar" – Dellima; "Don, Don, Don, Porradão!" – Gael Vicci, MC Mayarah, MC Aleff; "O Tempo Tem" – Rodk; "Ponta Cabeça" – Júlia Rezende; "Pra Ninguém Saber" – Kelvy; "Sinal Fechado" – Isabella Gaspary; "Te amo e ponto." – Lucas Andrade
Song by New International Artist	Brazilian Music Video
"Breathe" – Tiffany Aris; "Kawasaki" – Santos Bravos; "Lickback" – Véyah; "Never Let Go" – Lngshot; "Si yo pudiera CreATE" – Pato Garoz; "The Last Encounter" – Sofia Camara; "Tócame" – Mayo; "work" – No Na	"A Ceia" – Pabllo Vittar, Dupê; "Catedral" – Jão; "Desgraça" – Anitta; "Extraordinária" – Ebony; "Loira Gelada" – Luísa Sonza; "Lua Cheia" – Marina Sena; "O CHÁ" – Gloria Groove; "Tatuagem" – Diego Martins, Pocah, MC GW
International Music Video
"Bloody Paradise" – Enhypen; "Dream" – Lisa, Kentaro Sakaguchi; "Go" – Blackpink; "Hate That I Made You Love Me" – Ariana Grande; "I Want You Back" – Be:First; "Runway" – Lady Gaga, Doechii; "Sweet Tooth" – Bini; "Watch It Burn" – Katy Perry

=== Television ===
Favorite TV Host	Brazilian TV Star
Blogueirinha – De Frente com Blogueirinha; Cissa Guimarães – Sem Censura; Eliana – Em Família com Eliana; Fernanda Souza – Ilhados Com a Sogra; Lorelay Fox – Lorelive; Maju Coutinho – Fantástico; Patrícia Poeta – Encontro com Patrícia Poeta; Tadeu Schmidt – BBB	Gabriela Medvedovsky; João Victor Gonçalves; Juliette; Kenya Sade; Maisa Silva; Paulo Vieira; Sofia Starling; Tatá Werneck
International TV Star	Best Reality Star
Becky Armstrong; Connor Storrie; Inn Jakkrasin; Kit Connor; Maitreyi Ramakrishnan; Mert Ramazan Demir; Namtan Tipnaree; Sadie Sink	Ana Paula Renault – BBB 26; Catalina Tcherkaski (Titi) – Gran Hermano; Dudu Camargo – A Fazenda; Jordana Morais – BBB 26; Marciele Albuquerque – BBB 26; Pincoya Sin Glamourrr – Gran Hermano; Samira Sagr – BBB 26; Saory Cardoso – A Fazenda
Brazilian TV Series	International TV Series
Cangaço Novo – Prime Video; Dias Perfeitos – Globoplay; Emergência Radioativa – Netflix; Impuros – Disney+; Jogada de Risco – Globoplay; Os Donos do Jogo – Netflix; Pssica – Netflix; Reencarne – Globoplay	Boyfriend on Demand – Netflix; Bridgerton – Netflix; Fallout – Prime Video; Heated Rivalry – Crave; Khemjira – iQIYI; One Piece – Netflix; Stranger Things – Netflix; Wednesday – Netflix
BL Series of the Year	GL Series of the Year
Don't Be Too Emotional – iQIYI; Goddess Bless You From Death – iQIYI; Love Begins in the World of if – Viki; PAYBACK – iQIYI; Sammy's Children's Day – Viki; The Edge of Horizon – GagaOOLala; The Prosecutors Proposal – iQIYI; Ticket to Heaven – Viki	Broken of Love – Fabel Entertainment; ClaireBell – OneD; Enemies with Benefits – GMMTV; Hometown Romance – iQIYI; Love beyond Dreams – iQIYI; Queendom – WeTV; Somewhere Somehow – Idolfactory Official; The Air – iQIYI
Brazilian Actress	Brazilian Actor
Alice Carvalho – Cangaço Novo; Duda Santos – A Nobreza do Amor; Gabz – Coração Acelerado; Grazi Massafera – Três Graças; Isabel Teixeira – Quem Ama Cuida; Isadora Cruz – Guerreiros do Sol; Julia Dalavia – Dias Perfeitos; Letícia Colin – Quem Ama Cuida	Allan Souza Lima – Cangaço Novo; André Lamoglia – Os Donos do Jogo; Chay Suede – Quem Ama Cuida; Filipe Bragança – Coração Acelerado; Jaffar Bambirra – Dias Perfeitos; Johnny Massaro – Emergência Radioativa; Ronald Sotto – A Nobreza do Amor; Thomás Aquino – Guerreiros do Sol

=== Digital ===
Brazilian Fandom of the Year	International Fandom of the Year
Anitters – Anitta; Buiars – Priscila Buiar; Cactos – Juliette; Joelmáticos – Joelma; Magi – Natália Rosa and Sofia Starling; Mioters – Gustavo Mioto; Renaults – Ana Paula Renault; Samires – Samira Sagr	A'tin – SB19; Armys – BTS; Besty – Be:First; Blinks – Blackpink; Blooms – Bini; Engene – Enhypen; FreenBecky – Freen Sarocha and Becky Armstrong; Swifties – Taylor Swift
Creator of the Year	New Creator
Baú Explica; Boy Marinho; Camila Pudim; Jennifer Prioli; Jessica Diniz; Jotxinha; Natty Hills (Reinaldo Montalvão); Phellyx	Chaiany Andrade; Dri e Rê (Dois Por Todos); Fabrício Tarden; Felipe Goldenboy; Jordann Vicente; Lala; Mady Beeong; Veronica Domingues
Internet Personality	Brazilian Crush
Blogueirinha; Elana Valenaria; Eva Pacheco; Felipe Neto; Julia Alvarenga; Lara Silva; Sofia Santino; Tàmires Assîs	Alanis Guillen; Aline Patriarca; Bruna Marquezine; Gabriel Santana; João Guilherme; Natalie Smith; Pietro Antoneli; Priscilla Reis
International Crush	Ship of the Year
Caleb McLaughlin; Freen Sarocha; Hudson Williams; Madison Bailey; Namping Napatsakorn; Ongsa Theethuch; Yerin Ha; Zeudi Di Palma	FayeAtom / ArisaLalin – Broken of Love; MilkLove / ShashaGorya – Girls Rules; PerthSanta / PobmekSolar – Love You Teacher; PondPhuwin / TheePeach – Me and Thee; TeeHeng / JaneJane – Don't Be Too Emotional; TeeteePor / DuangQinn – Duang With You; ToptapMinlee / JaySun – Payback; XiZhao / ChusanLiuyi – Sammy's Children's Day
