= Stupid Wife (TV series) =

Brazilian LGBTQ+ drama/romance web series

- Genre: Drama; Romance; LGBTQ+
- Created by: Based on Remember Us by Nathália Sodré
- Written by: Fabio Brito; Priscilla Pugliese
- Directed by: Natalie Smith; Priscilla Pugliese
- Starring: Priscila Reis; Priscila Buiar; Thomás de Araújo
- Opening theme: "Wait On Me" by Raquel Castro and The Wildcardz
- Country of origin: Brazil
- Original language: Portuguese
- No. of seasons: 3
- No. of episodes: 33

Production
- Executive producers: Natalie Smith; Priscilla Pugliese; Rodrigo Tardelli; Taty Charpinel; Wendel Charpinel
- Production location: Rio de Janeiro
- Running time: 23–30 minutes
- Production company: Ponto Ação Produções

Original release
- Network: YouTube
- Release: 4 August 2022 – 4 April 2024

Stupid Wife is a Brazilian LGBTQ+ drama and romance web series, loosely based on the short story Remember Us by Nathália Sodré. Produced by Ponto Ação Produções and starring Priscilla Reis and Priscila Buiar, the series was directed by Natalie Smith and Priscilla Pugliese and premiered on YouTube on 4 August 2022.

The original fanfiction quickly gained popularity, leading to a Christmas special with four episodes released in December 2022, and a second season that premiered on 18 May 2023. The plot addresses important issues such as Dissociative amnesia and Depersonalization disorder.

The series received nine nominations at the Rio Webfest 2022 and won four awards, including “Best Drama Series” and “Best Drama Ensemble”.

== Synopsis ==
Luíza (Priscila Reis) and Valentina (Priscila Buiar) are law students and classmates, but from completely different worlds. Luíza sees in Valentina all the flaws she believes a person can have, and despises her. One day, however, Luíza wakes up ten years older and, to her horror, married to Valentina. Having suffered a trauma that led to dissociative amnesia, she does not remember her marriage or her son Léo (Thomás de Araújo). In this process, she must rediscover herself, while Valentina seeks to win back her wife.

== Cast ==
Actor	Character	Season 1 (2022)	Season 2 (2023)	Season 3 (2023–2024)
Priscilla Reis	Luíza	Main	Main	Main
Priscila Buiar	Valentina	Main	Main	Main
Thomás de Araújo	Léo	Main	Main	Main
Ingrid Pedroza	Duda	Main	Main	Main
Gabi Lemos	Carol	Main	Main	Main
Marcelo Petzen	Igor	Main	Main	Main
Wayne Marinho	Roger	Recurring	Main	Main
Helio Garcia	Augusto	Recurring	Guest	Guest
Ticiana Passos	Sônia	Recurring	Guest	Guest
Leno Lopes	Marcos	Guest	Recurring	Recurring
Valléria Freire	Catarina	Guest	Recurring	Recurring
Duda Wendling	Sara	Recurring	Recurring	Recurring
Ingrid Klug	Dr. Alice	Recurring	Recurring	Guest
Ana Luiza	Aninha	Guest	Recurring	Recurring
Divino Garcia	Dr. Cauã	Guest	—N/a	—N/a

== Awards and nominations ==
Year	Award	Category	Result
2022	Rio Webfest	Best Production	Nominated
2022	Rio Webfest	Best Soundtrack	Nominated
2022	Rio Webfest	Best Drama Screenplay	Nominated
2022	Rio Webfest	Best Drama Direction	Nominated
2022	Rio Webfest	Best Drama Series	Won
2022	Rio Webfest	Best Drama Ensemble	Won
2022	Rio Webfest	Best Brazilian Series	Won
2022	Rio Webfest	Best Actress in Drama (Priscila Buiar)	Won
2022	Rio Webfest	Best Actress in Drama (Priscila Reis)	Nominated
2022	BreakTudo Awards	Fictional Ship (with Priscila Reis and Priscila Buiar)	Won
2022	Asia Web Awards	Best Screenplay	Won
2022	Asia Web Awards	Best Actress (Priscila Buiar)	Won
2022	Asia Web Awards	Best Drama Series	Won
2022	Asia Web Awards	Best Director	Won
2022	Asia Web Awards	Best Ensemble	Won
2023	Sec Awards	Favorite Couple in Series	Nominated
2023	Rio Webfest	Best Drama Direction	Won
