= Prêmio Potências 2025 =

2025 award ceremony

2025 Prêmio Potências
- Date: November 24, 2025
- Location: Sala São Paulo; São Paulo, Brazil
- Hosted by: Rita Batista; João Pimenta

Television/radio coverage
- Network: DiaTV; PodPah
- Produced by: Mynd8

The Prêmio Potências 2025 marked the fifth edition of the event, held on November 24, 2025, at the Sala São Paulo in the city of São Paulo, Brazil. The ceremony was hosted by journalist Rita Batista and presenter João Pimenta. The event featured performances by Péricles, Karol Conká, Jota.pê, and Rael.

The ceremony was broadcast by Dia TV and the digital platform PodPah. Singer Péricles was honored during the ceremony.

== Winners and nominees ==
The nominations were announced in November 2025. Winners are listed first and highlighted in bold.

Best New Artist	Song of the Year
**Ajuliacosta**; J. Eskine; Joyce Alane; Núbia; Sued Nunes	**"Foguinho" – Gaby Amarantos**; "Amina" – Tasha & Tracie; "Cacos de Vidro" – BK' feat. Evinha; "Dharma" – Ajuliacosta; "Paraíso" – Ludmilla
Creator of the Year	Professional of the Year
**Nicolly Martins (@elanicolzzzzzzzzzz)**; Isabelle Daltro (@belledaltro); Laís Francine (@laisfrancine); Tet (@tettrem); Vitty (@euvitty)	**Zé Ricardo – VP Artistic Director, Rock World**; Alessandra Souza – CMO Stellantis; Gilvana Viana – Co-founder MugShot, Punks S/A, CASABLACK; Kaire Jorge – CEO Labbel Records; Ronald Pessanha – Globo Negritudes Leader
Campaign of the Year	Hosts of the Year
**Realezas Negras – White Horse/Diageo – Agency: Gana**; Código de Defesa e Inclusão do Consumidor Negro – L’Oréal Luxo / Beta Collective; Corredor em Perigo – Alma Preta / LEW’LARA\TBWA; Corpo Preto – Instituto Yduqs / Artplan; Nem Mesmo o WhatsApp – Creative X WhatsApp / GUT & SPARK	**Kenya Sade – Multishow/Globo**; **Thiago Oliveira – É de Casa/Globo**; Maju Coutinho – Fantástico/Globo; Paulo Vieira – GNT/Globo; Rita Batista – É de Casa/Globo
Best Supporting Actor	Best Supporting Actress
**Lucas Leto – Sardinha in Vale Tudo**; Abrahão Costa – Ray in Ray: Você Não Me Conhece; Breno Ferreira – André in Vale Tudo; L7nnon – Ryan in Dona de Mim; Tony Tornado – Lúcio in Êta Mundo Melhor	**Alice Carvalho – Otília in Guerreiros do Sol**; Aline Borges – Tânia in Dona de Mim; Belize Pombal – Consuêlo in Vale Tudo; Jessica Marques – Daniela in Vale Tudo; Linn da Quebrada – Bibiana in Vitória
Best Actor	Best Actress
**Seu Jorge – Leandro in Melhor Mãe do Mundo**; Ailton Graça – Luisão in Pablo & Luisão; Antônio Pitanga – Pacífico Licutan in Malês; Juan Paiva – Samuel in Dona de Mim; Ricardo Teodoro – Ronaldo in Baby	**Bella Campos – Maria de Fátima in Vale Tudo**; Camila Pitanga – Lola in Beleza Fatal; Dira Paes – Conceição in Pablo e Luisão; Shirley Cruz – Gal in Melhor Mãe do Mundo; Taís Araújo – Raquel in Vale Tudo
Athlete of the Year	Personality of the Year
**Rodrigo Pantera – Bodybuilder**; Alison dos Santos – Athletics; Rebeca Andrade – Artistic Gymnastics; Vic Albuquerque – Football / Corinthians; Vini Jr – Football / Real Madrid	**Gilberto Gil**; **Zé Ricardo**; Lázaro Ramos; Liniker; Mano Brown; Taís Araújo
Artist of the Year
**Liniker**; **Jota.pê**; Duquesa; Gaby Amarantos; Thiaguinho

== Special awards ==
The singer Péricles received a special tribute during the ceremony.

Tribute
Péricles
