= Tinn (musician) =

Brazilian singer-songwriter and record producer

- Born: Tiago Penteado Nogueira
- Occupations: Singer; songwriter; record producer
- Years active: 2021–present
- Musical career
- Genres: Pop; pop rock
- Labels: Virgin Music; Independent

Tiago Penteado Nogueira, known professionally as Tinn (Portuguese pronunciation: [ˈtʃĩ]; stylized in all caps), is a Brazilian singer, songwriter, and record producer.

== Career ==
Tinn gained initial traction at 19 years old on TikTok by creating content that reimagined popular songs under the premise "What if this song were in...?". (Note: Portuguese: "Como seria essa música, se fosse em...?") By January 2022, he had accumulated 235,000 followers on TikTok, and his Portuguese-language cover of "Save Your Tears" featuring Bea Duarte, uploaded to his YouTube channel, had reached 26,000 views. On 10 June 2022, he released his debut single, "Meu Romance", which addresses "platonic dependency". (Note: Portuguese: "dependência platônica") In the first week of September, he was nominated for Emerging Artist at the 2022 BreakTudo Awards. Later that month, he released the single "Imensidão". Two months later, he was announced as the first artist set to perform at the awards ceremony. On 22 November, the ceremony took place, where he performed both of his original songs, though he did not win the award. Three days later, the single "Não Consigo Mais Chorar" was released.

In February 2023, he featured on a remix of Vivi Wanderley's "Playground", which was included on the remix EP for the track. That same month, he released the single "Dopado", a collaboration with Zoo addressing emotional numbness caused by intense relationships, accompanied by a music video directed by Felipe Cardozo and Yuri Montanhini. In June, he released the pop rock single "Maior Otário da Cidade". Inspired by 2000s punk rock, he released the single "Dublê", depicting liberation from another person's influence and self-rediscovery. In September, he featured on Bruno Gadiol's single "Só Sei Me Apaixonar", ahead of the release of the deluxe edition of Gadiol's debut album, Jovem. On 8 November, Tinn signed a contract with Virgin Music Group Brasil in São Paulo, alongside managers, music producers, and executives including Virgin Music Brasil president Miguel Cariello and Universal Music Brasil vice-president Claudio Vargas. During the event, it was also revealed that he was working on his debut album.

A new single, "Despedida", inspired by indie and folk rock, was released in February 2024. On 15 March, he released his debut album, Antisocial, alongside music videos for "Apocalipse"—a collaboration with Bea Duarte—and the title track, both directed by Bruno Fioravanti. Focused on pop rock, the project reflects on recent years of Tinn's life, exploring themes ranging from solitude and naivety to empowerment and anger. The album comprises ten tracks, consisting of nine songs and an interlude, and includes the previously released singles "O Maior Otário da Cidade", "Dublê", and "Despedida". Within three days of its release, the music video for "Apocalipse" accumulated 30,000 views on YouTube alone. Later in March, he participated in a videocast produced through a partnership between Teatro Bradesco, Universal Music, and Opus Entretenimento at Lollapalooza Brasil 2024. In July, he featured on a collaboration with the band Uelo titled "Eu Odeio Despedidas", which combined elements of classic MPB and modern pop rock. In September, Tinn was interviewed by the web portal Festival Teen, where he discussed his recent life, including his move to the city of São Paulo. Reflecting on his life and history with music, he revealed that he was developing his second studio album.

In late October 2025, he released the single "Monstro". On 24 July 2026, he released his second studio album, Desvarios em Sextas-feiras à Noite, as an independent release featuring ten tracks. Prominent tracks from the album included "Um Sinal", "Acaba Comigo", and "A Uma Ligação". In September, it was revealed that "Acaba Comigo" was nominated for Independent Artist Release at the 2026 BreakTudo Awards. He collaborated with Bea Duarte again in early October on the song "A Casa Sempre Vence", which was inspired by the impact of online betting platforms in Brazil.

== Personal life ==
In April 2026, he explicitly stated in a YouTube video that he is gay. (Note: Tinn (3 April 2026). eu não tive adolescência [i didn't have a teenagehood] (Video) (in Brazilian Portuguese). Timestamp: 0:21 – via YouTube. "Me descobri gay foi bem difícil o suficiente." [Realizing that I'm gay was hard enough])

== Discography ==
=== Studio albums ===
Title	Details
Antisocial	Released: 15 March 2024; Label: Virgin Music; Formats: Digital download, streaming; Tracklist: 1. "Antisocial"; 2. "O Maior Otário da Cidade; 3. "Vilão"; 4. "Dias Passam" (interlude); 5. "Nunca Vou te Perdoar"; 6. "Dublê"; 7. "Todo Fudido"; 8. "Despedida"; 9. "Apocalipse" (with Bea Duarte); 10. "Início ao Fim"
Desvarios em Sextas-feiras à Noite	Released: 24 July 2026; Label: Independent; Formats: Digital download, streaming; Tracklist: 1. "Um Sinal"; 2. "Tão Perto"; 3. "Sol Vai Me Atormentar"; 4. "O Pesadelo do Brother Noé"; 5. "Psycho"; 6. "Acaba Comigo"; 7. "Doeu em Mim (Pior do que em Você)"; 8. "Parasites"; 9. "A Uma Ligação"; 10. "Os Anos que Você Tirou de Mim"

=== Extended plays ===
Title	Details
Primeiros Passos	Released: 27 January 2023; Label: Virgin Music; Formats: Digital download, streaming; Tracklist: 1. "Meu Romance" (stripped); 2. "Imensidão" (stripped); 3. "Não Consigo Mais Chorar" (stripped)

=== Singles ===
==== As lead artist ====
Title	Year	Album
"ABCDEFU" (Brazilian Portuguese version) (with Ariah)	2022	Non-album single
"Meu Romance"	2022	Non-album single
"Imensidão"	2022	Non-album single
"Não Consigo Mais Chorar"	2022	Non-album single
"Dopado" (with Zoo)	2023	Non-album single
"O Maior Otário da Cidade"	2023	Antisocial
"Dublê"	2023	Antisocial
"Só Sei Me Apaixonar" (with Bruno Gadiol)	2023	Jovem (Deluxe)
"Nunca Vou te Perdoar"	2023	Antisocial
"Despedida"	2024	Antisocial
"Apocalipse" (with Bea Duarte)	2024	Antisocial
"Eu Odeio Despedidas" (with Uelo)	2024	Non-album single
"Não Consigo Ficar Parado" (with Ruxell)	2025	Segundo Raio Elétrico
"Monstro"	2025	Non-album single
"A Uma Ligação"	2026	Desvarios em Sextas-feiras à Noite
"A Casa Sempre Vence" (with Bea Duarte)	2026	Non-album single
"Egotrip"	2026	Non-album single

==== As featured artist ====
Title	Year	Album
"Só Mais Um Passo" (Laura Schadeck featuring Tinn)	2026	Non-album single

== Awards and nominations ==
Award	Year	Recipient(s) and nominee(s)	Category	Result	Ref.
BreakTudo Awards	2022	Tinn	Emerging Artist	Nominated	
BreakTudo Awards	2023	"Não Consigo Mais Chorar"	New Brazilian Artist Song	Nominated	
BreakTudo Awards	2026	"Acaba Comigo"	Independent Artist Release	Pending	
