= Brazil Songs =

Weekly Brazilian music chart by Billboard magazine

Brazil Songs was a record chart in Brazil, published weekly by Billboard magazine. The chart was launched in February 2022, as part of Billboard's Hits of the World chart collection, ranking the top 25 songs weekly in more than 40 countries around the globe and is based on digital sales and online streaming. This is the first local Billboard chart in Brazil since the discontinuation of the Brasil Hot 100 Airplay after Billboard Brasil ceased its operation for an undisclosed reason in January 2019. The Brazil Songs chart was replaced by the Brasil Hot 100 in August 2023 with the relaunch of Billboard Brasil.

The first number-one song on the chart was "Malvadão 3" by Xamã, Neo Beats and Gustah, on the issue dated February 19, 2022.

== Methodology ==
The chart tracks songs' performance from Friday to Thursday. Chart rankings are based on digital downloads from full-service digital music retailers (sales from direct-to-consumer sites such as an individual artist's store are excluded) and online streaming occurring in Brazil during the tracking period. All data are provided by Luminate Data, formerly MRC Data.

== List of number-one songs ==
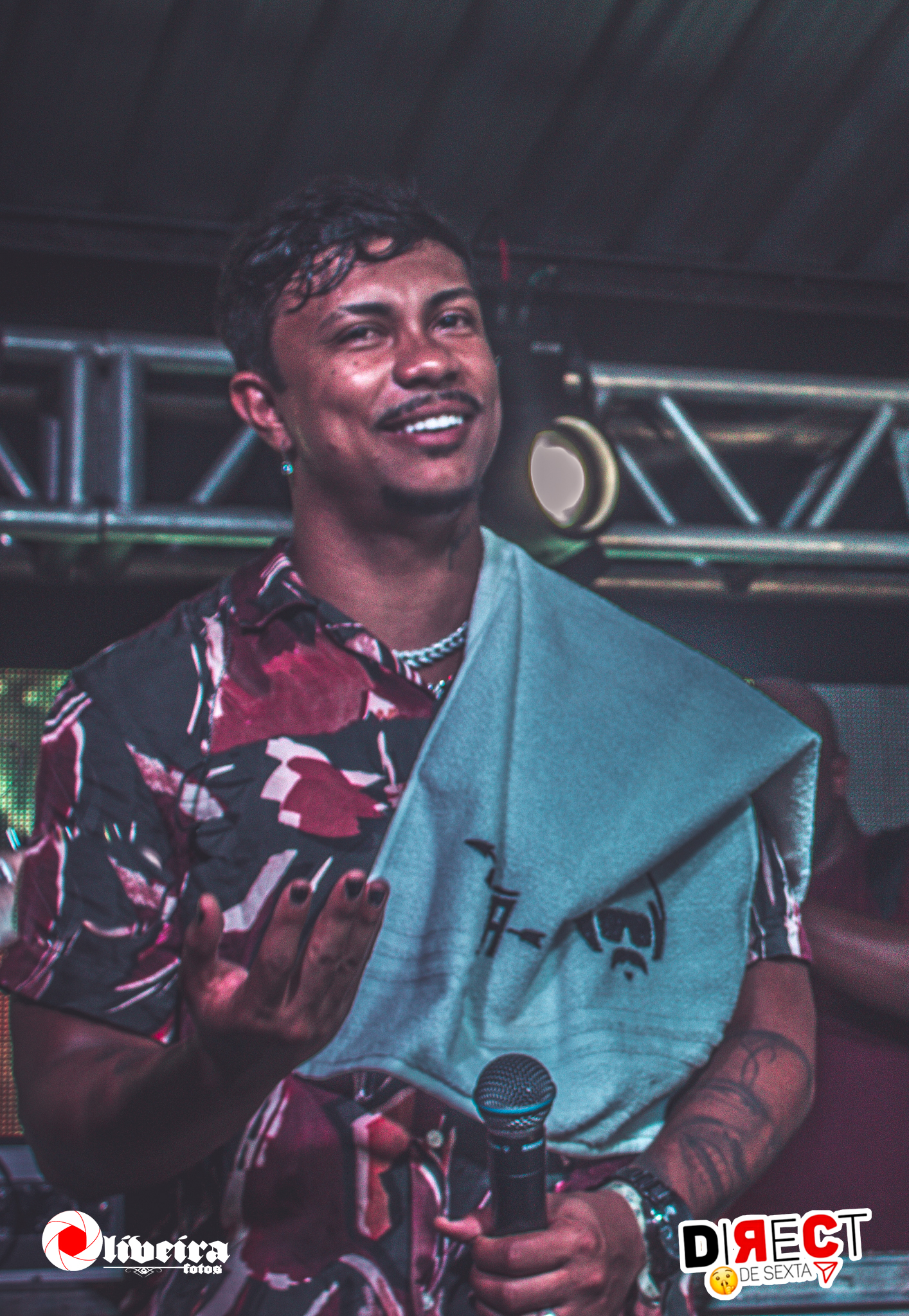
Xamã achieved the first Brazil Songs number-one with "Malvadão 3", which topped the chart for three consecutive weeks.

=== 2022 ===
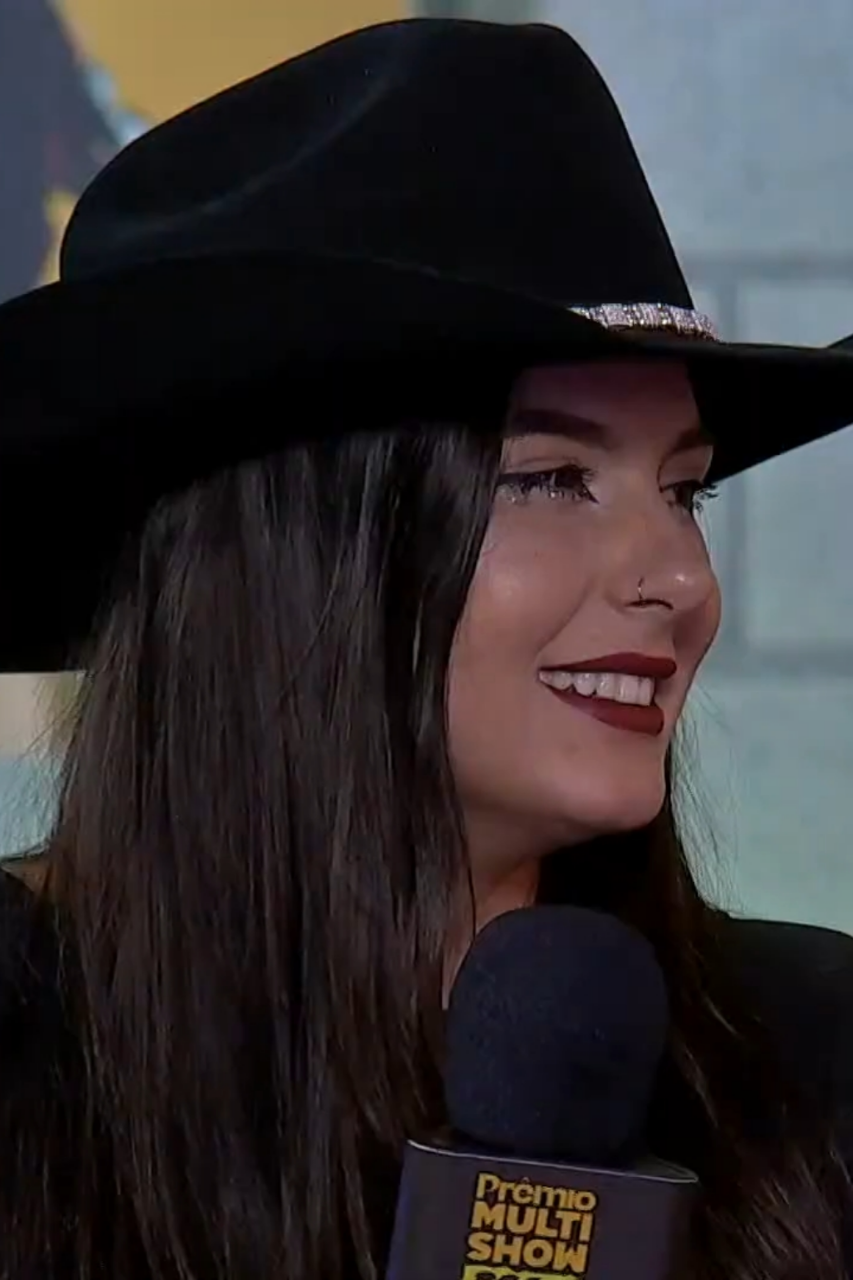
With a total of 10 weeks, Ana Castela was the artist who topped the Brazil Songs for the longest time in 2022.

Issue date	Song	Artist(s)	Ref.
February 19	"Malvadão 3"	Xamã, Neo Beats and Gustah	
February 26	"Malvadão 3"	Xamã, Neo Beats and Gustah	
March 5	"Malvadão 3"	Xamã, Neo Beats and Gustah	
March 12	"Dançarina"	Pedro Sampaio and MC Pedrinho	
March 19	"Dançarina"	Pedro Sampaio and MC Pedrinho	
March 26	"Dançarina"	Pedro Sampaio and MC Pedrinho	
April 2	"Envolver"	Anitta	
April 9	"Envolver"	Anitta	
April 16	"Sentadona (Ai Calica)"	MC Frog, Davi Kneip and DJ Gabriel Do Borel	
April 23	"Sentadona (Ai Calica)"	MC Frog, Davi Kneip and DJ Gabriel Do Borel	
April 30	"Sentadona (Ai Calica)"	MC Frog, Davi Kneip and DJ Gabriel Do Borel	
May 7	"Sentadona (Ai Calica)"	MC Frog, Davi Kneip and DJ Gabriel Do Borel	
May 14	"Sentadona (Ai Calica)"	MC Frog, Davi Kneip and DJ Gabriel Do Borel	
May 21	"Sentadona (Ai Calica)"	MC Frog, Davi Kneip and DJ Gabriel Do Borel	
May 28	"Sentadona (Ai Calica)"	MC Frog, Davi Kneip and DJ Gabriel Do Borel	
June 4	"Acorda Pedrinho"	Jovem Dionisio	
June 11, 2022	"Acorda Pedrinho"	Jovem Dionisio	
June 18	"Acorda Pedrinho"	Jovem Dionisio	
June 25	"Termina Comigo Antes"	Gusttavo Lima	
July 2	"Termina Comigo Antes"	Gusttavo Lima	
July 9	"Bandido"	Zé Felipe and MC Mari	
July 16	"Bandido"	Zé Felipe and MC Mari	
July 23	"Ai Preto"	L7nnon, DJ Biel do Furduncinho and Bianca	
July 30	"Pipoco"	Ana Castela, Melody e DJ Chris No Beat	
August 6	"Pipoco"	Ana Castela, Melody e DJ Chris No Beat	
August 13	"Pipoco"	Ana Castela, Melody e DJ Chris No Beat	
August 20	"Pipoco"	Ana Castela, Melody e DJ Chris No Beat	
August 27	"Pipoco"	Ana Castela, Melody e DJ Chris No Beat	
September 3	"Pipoco"	Ana Castela, Melody e DJ Chris No Beat	
September 10	"Pipoco"	Ana Castela, Melody e DJ Chris No Beat	
September 17	"Pipoco"	Ana Castela, Melody e DJ Chris No Beat	
September 24	"Casei com a Putaria"	MC Paiva and MC Ryan SP	
October 1	"Casei com a Putaria"	MC Paiva and MC Ryan SP	
October 8	"Poesia Acústica 13"	MC Cabelinho, TZ da Coronel, Chefin, Luísa Sonza, N.I.N.A., Xamã, Oruam, Chris MC, L7nnon and Salve Malak	
October 15	"Casei com a Putaria"	MC Paiva and MC Ryan SP	
October 22	"Eu Gosto Assim"	Gustavo Mioto and Mari Fernandez	
October 29	"Eu Gosto Assim"	Gustavo Mioto and Mari Fernandez	
November 5	"Eu Gosto Assim"	Gustavo Mioto and Mari Fernandez	
November 12	"Eu Gosto Assim"	Gustavo Mioto and Mari Fernandez	
November 19	"Eu Gosto Assim"	Gustavo Mioto and Mari Fernandez	
November 26	"Eu Gosto Assim"	Gustavo Mioto and Mari Fernandez	
December 3	"Evoque Prata"	MC Menor HR, MC Menor SG and DJ Escobar	
December 10	"Evoque Prata"	MC Menor HR, MC Menor SG and DJ Escobar	
December 17	"Evoque Prata"	MC Menor HR, MC Menor SG and DJ Escobar	
December 24	"Bombonzinho"	Israel & Rodolffo and Ana Castela	
December 31	"Bombonzinho"	Israel & Rodolffo and Ana Castela	

== See also ==
- Brasil Hot 100
