= Turma da Mônica Jovem: Reflexos do Medo =

2024 film by Mauricio Eça

- Directed by: Mauricio Eça
- Screenplay by: Sabrina Garcia; Rodrigo Goulart; Regina Negrini; Antonio Arruda
- Based on: Turma da Mônica Jovem by Mauricio de Sousa
- Produced by: Mauro D'Addio; Juliana Capelini
- Starring: Sophia Valverde; Xande Valois; Bianca Paiva; Théo Salomão; Carol Roberto; Giovanna Chaves
- Production companies: Bronze Filmes; BeBossa Entertainment; Mauricio de Sousa Produções
- Distributed by: Imagem Filmes
- Release date: 18 January 2024 (Brazil)
- Running time: 88 minutes
- Country: Brazil
- Language: Portuguese

Turma da Mônica Jovem: Reflexos do Medo (lit. 'Monica's Gang Teen: Reflections of Fear') is a 2024 Brazilian adventure fantasy film directed by Mauricio Eça and based on the Turma da Mônica Jovem comic book series created by Mauricio de Sousa.

The film stars Sophia Valverde, Xande Valois, Bianca Paiva, Théo Salomão and Carol Roberto. It was released in Brazil on 18 January 2024 by Imagem Filmes.

== Cast ==
- Sophia Valverde as Monica Sousa
- Xande Valois as Cebolácio "Cebola" Menezes da Silva Júnior
- Bianca Paiva as Magali Fernandes de Lima
- Théo Salomão as Cássio "Cascão" Marques de Araújo
- Carol Roberto as Milena Sustenido
- Giovanna Chaves as Carmem "Carminha" Frufru
- Carolina Amaral as Denise
- Bruno Vinícius as Jeremias
- Lucas Pretti as Timóteo "Titi"
- Yuma Ono as Do Contra (DC)
- Pedro Ogata as Nimbus
- Julia Rabello as Isabelle Frufru
- Mateus Solano as Professor Licurgo (Louco)
- Rodrigo Fernandes as Professor Falcolni
- Maria Bopp as Professor Ana Paula
- Ataíde Arcoverde as Lindolfo
- Eliana Fonseca as Aunt Nena
- Hugo Laloni and Victor Argolo as Cabeça de Balde
- Leonardo Morais as Chico Bento

== Production ==
=== Development ===
A live-action adaptation of Turma da Mônica Jovem was first announced in 2016, with Christiano Metri attached to direct and an initial release planned for 2019.

After several years in development, the original project was shelved. Production restarted in 2022 under director Mauricio Eça with a new screenplay and the subtitle Reflexos do Medo. Principal cast members Sophia Valverde, Xande Valois, Bianca Paiva, Théo Salomão and Carol Roberto were officially announced in March 2023.

== Release ==
The film was released theatrically in Brazil on 18 January 2024 by Imagem Filmes.

== Reception ==
Turma da Mônica Jovem: Reflexos do Medo received generally negative reviews from Brazilian critics.

Julia Sabbaga of Omelete gave the film 2 out of 5 stars, praising the cast but criticizing the screenplay and direction. Folha de S.Paulo also awarded the film 2 out of 5 stars, while CinePOP gave it 3 out of 5 stars. Other publications were more critical. Esquina da Cultura rated the film 1 out of 5 stars, while Tangerina (UOL) gave it 0.5 out of 5 stars.
