= Automotivo Bibi Fogosa =

Single by Bibi Babydoll, DJ Brunin XM
- Language: Portuguese
- Released: May 19, 2023
- Genre: Proibidão (funk carioca)
- Length: 2:10

Music video
- "Automotivo Bibi Fogosa" on YouTube

Automotivo Bibi Fogosa (Brazilian Portuguese: [awtomoˈtʃivu biˈbi foˈɡɔzɐ]) is a song by Brazilian singer Bibi Babydoll and sound producer DJ Brunin XM released on May 19, 2023, via ONErpm. The song heavily samples Bring Me the Horizon's song "Can You Feel My Heart".

== Background ==
The song "Automotivo Bibi Fogosa" follows the Brazilian Proibidão funk carioca music style. In the song, Beyond Clarity, the singer states that her "pussy’s on fire" and "the stick’s gonna put out the fire".

== Commercial performance ==
"Automotivo Bibi Fogosa" debuted on the chart on July 19, 2023. The song reached number one on the music charts in Ukraine during the Russian invasion.

In a telephone interview, Bibi Babydoll, whose registered name is Beatriz Alcide Santos, says she has been a singer for 7 years and was surprised by the track's success in Ukraine.

== Music video ==
On July 9, 2023, a music video for the song "Automotivo Bibi Fogosa" was released on the Love Funk record label's official YouTube channel.

== Charts ==
Chart performance for "Automotivo Bibi Fogosa"
Chart (2023)	Peak position
Brazil (Billboard Brasil Hot 100)	75
Lithuania (AGATA)	26
