= Prêmio Potências =

Brazilian award honoring Black professionals in entertainment and sports (2021–present)

- Current: Prêmio Potências 2025
- Awarded for: Recognition of Black professionals in entertainment, sports, and culture
- Country: Brazil
- First award: November 2021; 5 years ago

Television/radio coverage
- Networks
- RedeTV (2022); Digital platforms (various years)

Prêmio Potências (translated as Potências Award) is a Brazilian award ceremony established in 2021 to honor and recognize Black professionals across entertainment, sports, and other cultural sectors.

== History ==
The award was created by the agency Mynd8 with the aim of providing visibility and recognition to Black talent in Brazil. Since its inception, the ceremony has grown in prominence and is considered one of the notable cultural events in the country. The inaugural edition took place in São Paulo and was hosted by Thelma Assis, João Luiz Pedrosa, and Gleici Damasceno. In 2022, the event was broadcast by RedeTV. The 2024 edition was held at Teatro Santander in São Paulo and featured Ludmilla as the honored artist of the year.

== Editions ==
Prêmio Potências editions
| Year | Location | Hosts | Honored Artist |
|---|---|---|---|
| 2021 | São Paulo | Thelma Assis, João Luiz Pedrosa, Gleici Damasceno | — |
| 2022 | São Paulo | Preta Gil, Yuri Marçal, Lidi Lisboa, João Luiz Pedrosa | Gilberto Gil |
| 2023 | São Paulo | João Luiz Pedrosa, Yuri Marçal, Luana Xavier, Tia Má, Thelma Assis | Alcione |
| 2024 | São Paulo | Preta Gil, Rita Batista, Stella Yeshua, Thiago Oliveira, Yuri Marçal | Ludmilla |

== Categories ==
The award includes a wide range of categories recognizing achievements in music, sports, acting, digital content, and leadership. Categories may vary by year.

- Artist of the Year
- Song of the Year
- Revelation
- Athlete of the Year
- Actor of the Year
- Actress of the Year
- Supporting Actor
- Supporting Actress
- Personality of the Year
- Creator of the Year
- Professional of the Year
- Black Leadership
- Young Power (Potência Jovem)
- Campaign of the Year

== Jury and announcement ==
The selection of winners for the Potências Awards is curated by a technical jury composed of Black professionals active in the cultural and media industries. Among the names who have served on the jury are Preto Zezé, national president of the Central Única das Favelas, and Samantha Almeida, creative director at TV Globo. The initiative is supported by AUR, a platform dedicated to promoting Black culture and Afro-centered narratives.

The announcement of the 2025 nominees is scheduled for 8 November, through the social media channels of the Black Squad collective, affiliated with the Mynd agency.

== See also ==
- BET Awards
- Afro-Brazilian culture
- Brazilian music
