= DiaTV =

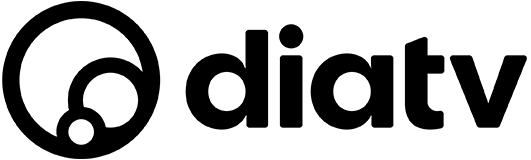
- Country: Brazil
- Broadcast area: Brazil
- Headquarters: Brazil, São Paulo

Programming
- Picture format: 1080i HDTV (upscaled to 16:9 480i/576i for the channel's standard-definition feed)

Ownership
- Owner: Rafa Dias
- Parent: Dia Estúdio

History
- Launched: August 4, 2008

Links
- Website: diaestudio.com

DiaTV is a Brazilian streaming television channel operated by Dia Estúdio. It was launched on May 3, 2023, with a multiplatform programming format, featuring six hours of live content per day.

The channel broadcasts through its official profiles on YouTube, Facebook, TikTok, and LinkedIn. The same live streams are simulcast across more than ten channels hosted by its presenters. Interactive live chats are available on each platform, allowing viewers to engage in real time.

In addition to original productions such as Corrida das Blogueiras and De Frente com Blogueirinha, DiaTV also features content from 13 other creator channels, including Wanessa Wolf, Blogueirinha, Diva Depressão, Foquinha, and Lorelay Fox.

== History ==
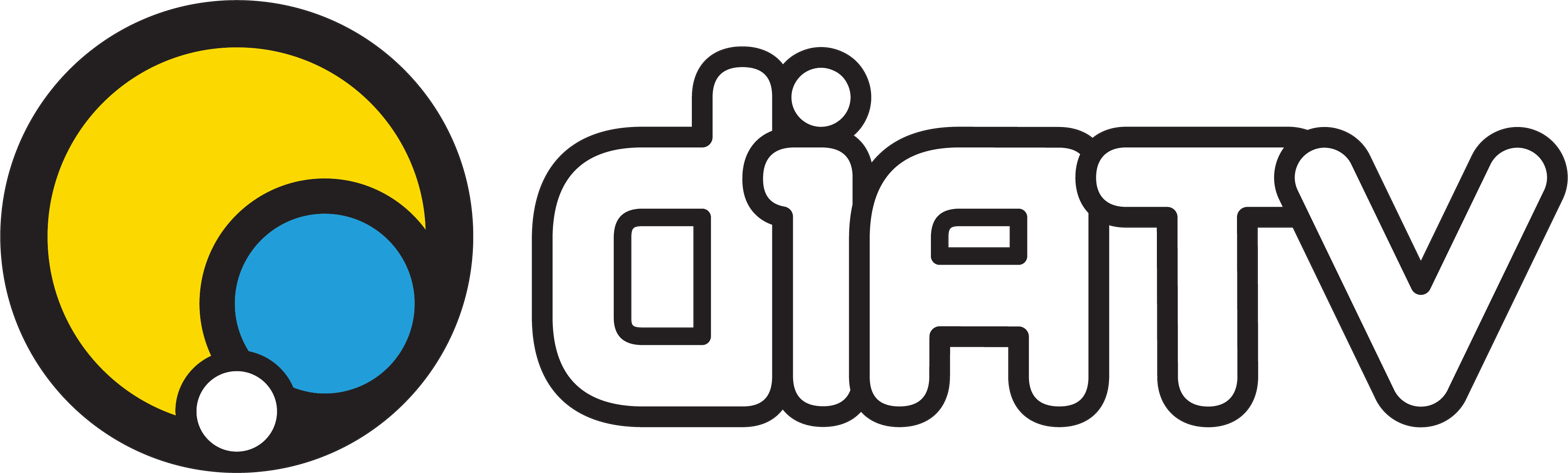
First DiaTV logo, used from May 3, 2023 to May 21, 2024

DiaTV was officially launched at 8 PM on May 3, 2023, with a manifesto video published on the Dia Estúdio channel, followed by a live performance by singer Silva.

The launch was followed by a special program showcasing highlights from Dia Estúdio’s previous productions. With a linear schedule featuring humor, music, food, news, gossip, interviews, and reality shows, DiaTV positioned itself as a new destination for fans of online content.

After each live broadcast, programs are made available on demand (VOD) via Dia Estúdio’s channels or the creators’ individual profiles. Collectively, these presenters reach over 87 million followers.

== Programming ==
- Blogueirinha, a Feia
- Corrida das Blogueiras
- De Frente com Blogueirinha
- Foquinha Entrevista
- Mari e as Marias
- Pra Variar
- Lorelive
- Diva Depressão Ao Vivo
- Tem Que Sustentar

== Awards and nominations ==
Notable awards and nominations for DiaTV programming
Year	Award	Category	Recipient	Result	Ref.
2025	Troféu Imprensa	Best Talk Show or Interview Program	De Frente com Blogueirinha	Nominated	
