= Priscila Buiar =

Brazilian actress and model (born 1991)

- Born: Priscila Angélica Mattias Buiar; 7 November 1991 (age 34); Maringá, Paraná, Brazil
- Education: Universidade Estadual de Londrina
- Occupations: Actress; Model
- Years active: 2016–present
- Known for: Magenta; Stupid Wife
- Height: 1.68 m (5 ft 6 in)
- Website: www.pribuiar.com.br

Priscila Buiar (born 7 November 1991) is a Brazilian actress and model, best known for her performances in the web series Magenta and Stupid Wife. In 2022, she won the Rio Webfest and the Asia Web Awards in the category of Best Actress in Drama for her role in Stupid Wife.

== Career ==
Buiar appeared in several television commercials, including Niely Gold’s “Dê a volta por cima” alongside Giovanna Antonelli, and stage plays such as Hamlet Essencial (2015). In 2017, she played Linda Cipriani in the short film Fenômenos.

In 2018, she joined the cast of the web series Magenta, portraying Manuela, a role that earned her recognition and awards at festivals such as the Rio Webfest. The series became a favorite among Brazilian LGBT audiences. She also appeared in Borges (2018) by Porta dos Fundos.

In 2022, Buiar starred in Stupid Wife as Valentina Albuquerque, a role that brought her widespread acclaim and multiple awards. The series ran for three seasons and two specials, ending in April 2024.

In 2023, she starred in the short film Prayer Rio Version, winning Best Actress at the Diamond Bell International Film Festival and The Panama Series Festival. In 2024, she joined the cast of the telenovela Reis (Record TV) as Ula, and appeared in the horror film Sala Escura. In 2025, she starred in the American short film A Matter of Time, which premiered at the New York Shorts International Film Festival. In 2026, she joined the cast of the American series Dirty Roomie (season 3).

== Filmography ==
=== Television ===
- A Força do Querer (2017) – Claudio’s girlfriend (guest, 3 episodes)
- O Rico e Lázaro (2017) – guest role
- Borges (2018) – Daniela Vianna
- Amor sem Igual (2019) – Joyce (guest, 2 episodes)
- Quanto Mais Vida, Melhor! (2021) – guest role
- Reis (2024–2025) – Ula (seasons 12–13)
- Dona de Mim (2025) – Haná
- Dirty Roomie (2026) – Luana (lead, season 3)

=== Web series ===
- Azul É A Cor Mais Quente (2016) – Adele (parody)
- Magenta (2018–2020) – Manuela (lead)
- Contos Latentes (2019) – Manuela (guest)
- Encontro (2019) – Camila (recurring)
- Marotos – Uma História (2019) – Narcissa Malfoy (recurring)
- Copo Descartável (2021) – Samira (lead)
- 58 Segundos (2021) – Camila (guest)
- Stupid Wife (2022–2024) – Valentina Albuquerque (lead)

=== Films ===
- A Garota da Loja de Livros (2007) – Vivian (short)
- Duas Garotas. Um banheiro. Traição! (2010) – Bruna (short)
- Olhos Vivos (2016) – Sofia (short)

== Awards and nominations ==
Year	Award	Category	Work	Result	Ref.
2019	Rio Webfest	Best Drama Ensemble	Magenta	Won	
2020	Asia Web Awards	Best Actress in Drama	Magenta	Won	
2020	Rio Webfest	Best Actress in Drama	Magenta	Nominated	
2021	Rio Webfest	Best Actress in Action, Sci-Fi & Thriller	Copo Descartável	Nominated	
2021	Asia Web Awards	Best Actress in Action, Sci-Fi & Thriller	Copo Descartável	Won	
2022	Rio Webfest	Best Actress in Drama	Stupid Wife	Won	
2022	Rio Webfest	Best Drama Ensemble	Stupid Wife	Won	
2022	BreakTudo Awards	Fictional Ship (with Priscila Reis)	Stupid Wife	Won	
2022	Asia Web Awards	Best Drama Ensemble	Stupid Wife	Won	
2022	Asia Web Awards	Best Actress in Drama	Stupid Wife	Won	
2023	Rio Webfest	Best Actress in Drama	Stupid Wife	Nominated	
2023	Rio Webfest	Best Drama Ensemble	Stupid Wife	Nominated	
2023	Rio Webfest	Best Popular Vote Personality	Stupid Wife	Won	
2023	Ancec – National Agency of Culture and Entrepreneurship	National Reference Cross in Performing Arts	Stupid Wife	Won	
2023	Sec Awards	Favorite Couple in Series (with Priscila Reis)	Stupid Wife	Nominated	
2023	International Online Web Fest	Best Newcomer Actress	Stupid Wife	Won	
2023	NZ Web Fest	Best Actress: Narrative	Stupid Wife	Nominated	
2023	Hollywood Series Awards	Best Actress	Stupid Wife	Won	
2023	Acervo Awards	Rising Star	Herself	Won	
2023	Acervo Awards	Dominou Tudo	Herself	Won	
2023	Acervo Awards	Crush of the Year	Herself	Won	
2023	LA Web Awards	Best Actress	58 Segundos	Nominated	
2024	LA Web Awards	Best Actress	Stupid Wife	Nominated	
2024	Sec Awards	Favorite Couple/Ship (with Priscila Reis)	Stupid Wife	Won	
2024	Diamond Bell International Film Festival	Best Actress	Prayer Rio Version	Won	
2024	The Panama Series Festival	Best Actress	Prayer Rio Version	Won	
2024	Swedish International Film Festival	Best Actress	Prayer Rio Version	Won	
2024	British Web Awards	Best Actress	Prayer Rio Version	Nominated	
2024	Prêmio Jovem Brasileiro	Fitness Influencer	Selfcare by Pri Buiar	Won	
2024	BreakTudo Awards	Fictional Ship (with Priscila Reis)	Stupid Wife	Nominated	
2024	NZ Web Fest	Best Actress: Narrative	Stupid Wife	Nominated	
2024	Rio Webfest	Best Drama Ensemble	Stupid Wife	Nominated	
2024	Rio Webfest	Best Actress in Drama	Stupid Wife	Nominated	
2024	Rio Webfest	Best Popular Vote Personality	Stupid Wife	Won	
2025	LA Web Awards	Best Actress	Stupid Wife	Won	
2025	New York Shorts International Film Festival	Best Actress	A Matter Of Time	Won	
2025	FESTiFRANCE	Best Actress	O Som do Silêncio	Won	
2025	BIMIFF – Brazil International Monthly Independent Film Festival	Best Actress	O Som do Silêncio	Won	
2025	African Smartphone International Film Festival	Best Actress	Prayer Petrópolis	Won	
