= Priscilla Reis =

Brazilian actress (born 1990s)

- Born: Brazil
- Other name: Pricila Reis
- Occupations: Actress; Model
- Years active: 2009–present
- Known for: Stupid Wife (2022–2024); Quem vai ficar com Clara? (2025); Todo Dia a Mesma Noite (Netflix); Benefits with Friends (Disney+, 2026)

Priscilla Reis is a Brazilian actress best known for starring in the web series Stupid Wife (2022–2024) and Quem vai ficar com Clara? (2025). She also portrayed Bia in Netflix’s Todo Dia a Mesma Noite and joined the cast of Disney+ series Benefits with Friends (2026) as Yasmin.

== Biography ==
Reis began her career in television in 2009 with a guest role in Cama de Gato. In 2015, she appeared in Vidas Secretas, followed by roles in Espelho da Vida and Travessia.

In 2016, she played Liza in GNT’s series Lúcia McCartney. Her breakthrough came in 2022 when she starred as Luíza in the web series Stupid Wife, a role that brought her national recognition and international attention. She continued in the role until 2024, across three seasons and specials.

In 2025, she starred as Clara in Quem vai ficar com Clara?, and in 2026 she joined Disney+ series Benefits with Friends portraying Yasmin. She also appeared in the Netflix miniseries Todo Dia a Mesma Noite, based on the Kiss nightclub tragedy.

== Filmography ==
=== Television series ===
Year	Title	Role	Notes
2009	Cama de Gato	Guest role	Participation
2017	Vidas Secretas	—	Supporting role
2016	Lúcia McCartney	Liza	Secondary role
2018	Espelho da Vida	—	Supporting role
2022–2024	Stupid Wife	Luíza	Lead role (Protagonist)
2023	Travessia	Guest role	Cameo
2024	Depois da Meia-Noite	—	Supporting role
2025	Quem vai ficar com Clara?	Clara	Lead role (Protagonist)
2025	Vale Tudo	Guest role	Cameo
2026	Benefits with Friends	Yasmin	Secondary role (Disney+)

=== Films ===
Year	Title	Role	Notes
2024	A Porta ao Lado	Suzana	Feature film

== Awards and nominations ==
Year	Award	Category	Work	Result	Ref.
2022	Rio Webfest	Best Actress in Drama	Stupid Wife	Nominated	
2022	Rio Webfest	Best Drama Series	Stupid Wife	Won	
2022	Rio Webfest	Best Drama Ensemble	Stupid Wife	Won	
2023	Hollywood Series Awards	Best Actress	Stupid Wife	Won	
2025	Rio Webfest	Best Actress (Comedy)	Quem vai ficar com Clara?	Won	
2025	Prêmio Jovem Brasileiro	Best TikToker	Herself	Won	
2025	Apulia Webfest (Italy)	Best Actress	Stupid Wife	Won	
