= Bea Duarte =

Brazilian singer and songwriter (born 1997)

- Born: Beatriz Duarte Leme; 30 April 1997 (age 29); São Bernardo do Campo, São Paulo, Brazil
- Occupations: Singer, songwriter, multi-instrumentalist
- Years active: 2019–present
- Musical career
- Genres: Pop; Indie Pop
- Label: Independent

Beatriz Duarte Leme (born 30 April 1997), known professionally as Bea Duarte (Portuguese pronunciation: [ˈbɛa duˈaʁtʃi]) is a Brazilian singer, songwriter, and multi-instrumentalist. According to Folha de S.Paulo, she gained prominence among Generation Z in Brazil for her social media content, being described as vegan, autistic, and a practitioner of witchcraft, in addition to investing in compositions considered more complex and lyrically dense. She works as an independent artist.

In 2019, she released the single "Paz", marking the beginning of her career. In 2025, she released her debut album, Commedia D'arte, whose track "Pacto" was nominated at the BreakTudo Awards 2025 in the Independent Artist Release category.

== Career ==
In July 2019, Duarte released her debut single, "Paz", a voice-and-guitar composition. The following year, she gained notoriety on TikTok in Brazil after creating content focused on vocal technique, including analyses of singers’ voices. In October 2021, she released the song "Lilith" as the lead single from her first extended play (EP). In September 2022, she collaborated with Concê and Scalon on the track "Tiro de Canhão". Two months later, her indie pop single "Cantando" was released. In 2023, the single "Tom" was released in January, followed by the EP Mulheres Que Correm, in July, consisting of six tracks. The project was inspired by the book Women Who Run with the Wolves by Clarissa Pinkola Estés. Among the EP's tracks, "Mar" achieved significant attention.

In March 2024, Duarte featured on the track "Apocalipse" alongside musician Tinn, included on his debut album Antisocial. Two months later, she released the single "Supostamente", in which she addresses criticism and accusations, accompanied by a music video featuring drag queen Ismeiow. In August, the song "Mar", which had already accumulated millions of streams on YouTube and Spotify, received a funk carioca remix produced by BeatWill. The following month, the single "Vibes" was released. In the same month, she performed at Estúdio Showlivre in a session broadcast on the project's YouTube channel, where she performed her most recently released song for the first time. At the time, her music had accumulated approximately 14 million streams on Spotify.

Duarte's debut studio album was announced in January 2025. The album, titled Commedia D’arte, was released in two acts: the first was released on 30 April, and the second on 31 October, completing the project. In March 2026, Duarte released the single "Não Vai Levar", in response to cases of femicide reported in Brazil in 2025. She released the single that concludes the promotion of the album "Commedia D'arte", entitled "Adeus" on April 30th of the same year.

== Personal life ==
Duarte was born in São Bernardo do Campo, a municipality in the state of São Paulo, Brazil. At the age of 26, she was diagnosed with autism, with the assessment also indicating giftedness. She is openly pansexual.

== Discography ==
=== Albums ===
==== Studio albums ====
Title	Details
Commedia D'arte	Released: 31 October 2025; Label: Independent; Formats: Digital download, streaming; Tracklist Disc 1: 1. "Dell'arte"; 2. "Pacto"; 3. "Supostamente"; 4. "Bruxa"; 5. "Máscaras"; 6. "Décadanse"; 7. "Mensagem"; 8. "Morte"; 9. "Divina"; Disc 2: 1. "Commedia"; 2. "Decodificar"; 3. "Foragido"; 4. "Volta"; 5. "Casa"; 6. "Palhaço"; 7. "Crescer"; 8. "Beatriz" (Note: "Beatriz" is a cover version of the original song composed by Edu Lobo and Chico Buarque.); 9. "Adeus" (Note: When the album was released, "Adeus" appeared as a locked track. The song is scheduled to be released as a single in late April 2026.)

==== Live albums ====
Title	Details
Bea Duarte no Estúdio Showlivre	Released: 18 October 2024; Label: Showlivre; Formats: Digital download, streaming

=== Extended plays ===
Title	Details
Mulheres Que Correm	Released: 7 July 2023; Label: Independent; Formats: Digital download, streaming; Tracklist: 1. "Chamado"; 2. "Mulheres Que Correm"; 3. "Lilith"; 4. "Ignorância"; 5. "Mar"; 6. "Culpa"

=== Singles ===
Title	Year	Album
"Paz"	2019	Non-album singles
"Antes de Sair"	2020	Non-album singles
"Antes de Sair" (acoustic)	2020	Non-album singles
"Calor"	2021	Non-album singles
"Finge Agora"	2021	Non-album singles
"Lilith"	2021	Mulheres Que Correm (EP)
"Tiro de Canhão" (with Scalon and Concê)	2022	Non-album singles
"Cantando"	2022	Non-album singles
"Tom"	2023	Non-album singles
"Ignorância"	2023	Mulheres Que Correm (EP)
"Mar" (speed)	2023	Non-album singles
"Apocalipse" (with Tinn)	2024	Antisocial
"Supostamente"	2024	Commedia D'arte
"Mar" (MTG Remix) (featuring BeatWill)	2024	Non-album singles
"Vibes"	2024	Non-album singles
"Mensagem"	2025	Commedia D'arte
"Máscaras"	2025	Commedia D'arte
"Dell'arte" (extended)	2025	Non-album singles
"Casa"	2025	Commedia D'arte
"Não Vai Levar"	2026	Non-album singles
"Adeus"	2026	Commedia D'arte
"A Casa Sempre Vence" (with Tinn)	2026	Non-album singles

== Filmography ==
=== Television ===
Title	Role	Notes	Ref.
Canta Comigo Teen	Judge	Record	

== Awards and nominations ==
Award	Year	Recipient(s) and nominee(s)	Category	Result	Ref.
BreakTudo Awards	2025	"Pacto"	Independent Artist Release	Nominated	
BreakTudo Awards	2026	Bea Duarte	Brazilian Artist on the Rise	Pending	
BreakTudo Awards	2026	"Adeus"	Best Pop Release	Pending	
