= Lucas Pretti =

- Born: Lucas Pretti; May 30, 2002 (age 24); Belo Horizonte, Minas Gerais, Brazil
- Genre: Pop
- Occupations: Singer, songwriter, actor
- Years active: 2019–present
- Label: The Orchard (2025–present)

Lucas Pretti (born 30 May 2002) is a Brazilian singer, songwriter and actor. He made his musical debut in 2019 with the single "Fica Comigo". In 2024, he was featured in Billboard Descobre, a project by Billboard Brasil highlighting emerging Brazilian artists. In 2025, he released his debut studio album, Cara Ideal, and signed with The Orchard. As an actor, he made his film debut portraying Titi in Turma da Mônica Jovem: Reflexos do Medo.

== Career ==
Pretti began his music career in 2019 with the release of the single "Fica Comigo". In 2020, he released his debut EP, Roda. That same year, he released "Um Dia Inteiro", a collaboration with DJ DUX, which surpassed 14 million streams on Spotify. In August 2020, he opened for Brazilian singer Vitão at the Drive Experience Show in Alagoas and was interviewed by AL2, the news program of TV Gazeta, a Globo affiliate.

In 2021, his single "Saudade de Você" surpassed one million views on YouTube and reached the Top 20 on Brazilian radio airplay, on Crowley Broadcast Analysis.

In 2022, he released his second EP, Chora Por Mim. He also participated in the Sky Sessions project alongside Any Gabrielly, Carol Biazin, João Figueiredo, and Clarissa. In 2023, he released the single "Mais Um Drama" through Virgin Music Brasil and Universal Music Brasil.

In 2024, Pretti made his acting debut in the film Turma da Mônica Jovem: Reflexos do Medo, portraying Titi. He also released the single "Marlboro", which addresses the end of an LGBT relationship, and was featured in Billboard Descobre.

In 2025, Pretti released his debut studio album, Cara Ideal, featuring collaborations with Johnny Hooker, Azzy, and DJ Gabriel do Borel. According to Rolling Stone Brasil, the album represents a new phase in his career and serves as a "pop confessional", exploring his flaws, contradictions, and personal identity. The same year, he signed with The Orchard and released a piseiro version of "Amor de Verão", produced by Vitinho Ferreira.

In July 2026, he released the single "Disco Tropical", the title track of his second studio album. The song incorporates influences from Djavan, Erasmo Carlos, Gilberto Gil, and Cazuza, marking the first time Pretti performed lyrics in English. The album was recorded in Paris and produced by Júnio Lage and Breno Virícimo.

== Discography ==
=== Studio albums ===
- Cara Ideal (2025)
- Disco Tropical (2026)

=== Extended plays ===
- Roda (2020)
- Chora Por Mim (2022)

=== Live albums ===
- Lucas Pretti no Estúdio Showlivre (Ao Vivo) (2024)

=== Singles ===
- "Um Dia Inteiro" (2019) (with DUX)
- "Saudade de Você" (2021)
- "Oi Sumido" (2021)
- "Garoto Invisível" (2024)
- "Marlboro" (2024)
- "Amor de Verão" (2024)
- "Falo Demais" (2025)
- "Disco Tropical" (2026)
- "Verde Neon" (2026) (with Giovanna Chaves and Ucha)

=== As featured artist ===
- "Me Leva" (2021) (Sophia Stedile featuring Lucas Pretti)

== Filmography ==
=== Film ===
Year	Title	Role	Notes
2024	Turma da Mônica Jovem: Reflexos do Medo	Titi	Main cast

=== Television specials ===
Year	Title	Role	Platform
2022	Lucas Pretti – Sky Sessions	Himself	Box Brazil Play; Prime Video
2024	Lucas Pretti – Live at Estúdio Showlivre	Himself	YouTube

== Awards and nominations ==
Year	Award	Category	Work	Result
2021	Pop Mais Awards	Best Breakthrough Male Artist	Lucas Pretti	Nominated
2025	Prêmio Claro Música	Breakthrough Artist	Lucas Pretti	Nominated
2025	BreakTudo Awards	Best Pop Release	"Falo Demais"	Nominated
