= Romeo (Anitta song) =

2025 single by Anitta

Single by Anitta
- Language: Spanish
- Released: February 6, 2025
- Genre: Reggaeton
- Length: 3:11
- Label: Floresta Records; Republic; Universal Latin
- Composers: Don Omar; Eliel Lind Osorio; Francisco Saldaña; Freddy Montalvo Jr.; Héctor Delgado; Phantom; Rafel Pina
- Lyricists: Larissa Machado; Lenny Tavárez
- Producer: Subelo NEO

Anitta singles chronology
"São Paulo" (2024)	"Romeo" (2025)	"Larissa" (2025)

Music video
- "ROMEO" on YouTube

"Romeo" is a song by Brazilian singer Anitta, recorded for her upcoming studio album. The track was released as a single on February 6, 2025. It is a reggaeton song sung in Spanish and was distributed by Floresta Records, Republic Records, and Universal Music Latino.

== Background and promotion ==
Before the release, Anitta mentioned during a press conference at the "Ensaios da Anitta" event in Salvador that she was working on a new reggaeton in response to fan requests. She stated, "We're going to do a reggaeton, which so many fans love and ask me for. I hope they enjoy it—this project was created with everything they've always wanted from me!"

In an interview with Elle, Anitta explained the concept behind the music video and the single. While discussing Romeo, she stated, "I think people expect Juliet to be someone else or just a character, but in reality, Juliet is Larissa—it's me, my true self, the one inside that no one sees. So, in the music video, people will see both versions of me: the creator and the creature. I think it’s a really beautiful concept and an extension of all the work I’ve been doing."

When asked if this release would mark the beginning of a new album, Anitta replied, "Yes. That’s the idea behind this completely new phase of my life and career. … I have another side that I haven’t had the courage to show until now."

The song was released on February 6, 2025, embracing a contemporary reggaeton style. With its signature reggaeton beat and lyrics entirely in Spanish, the track highlights the artist's commitment to further expanding into the Latin market.

== Music video ==
The music video for Romeo was released simultaneously with the song on February 6, 2025. In the video, Anitta portrays the character of Romeo, dressed in silver armor with feathered wings, while Juliet is represented by Larissa—her birth name—in a more introspective version. The video offers a modern reinterpretation of the classic Romeo and Juliet story.

== Style and Production ==
"Romeo" embraces the signature elements of reggaeton, blending strong beats with a modern production, featuring lyrics written and performed in Spanish. The track also incorporates samples from two songs:

- "Entre Tú y Yo", by Luny Tunes, Noriega & Don Omar;
- "Perreo Baby", by Hector y Tito.

== Charts ==
Weekly chart performance for "Romeo"
Chart (2025)	Peak position
Brazil Hot 100 (Billboard)	50
