= Bibi Babydoll =

Brazilian singer

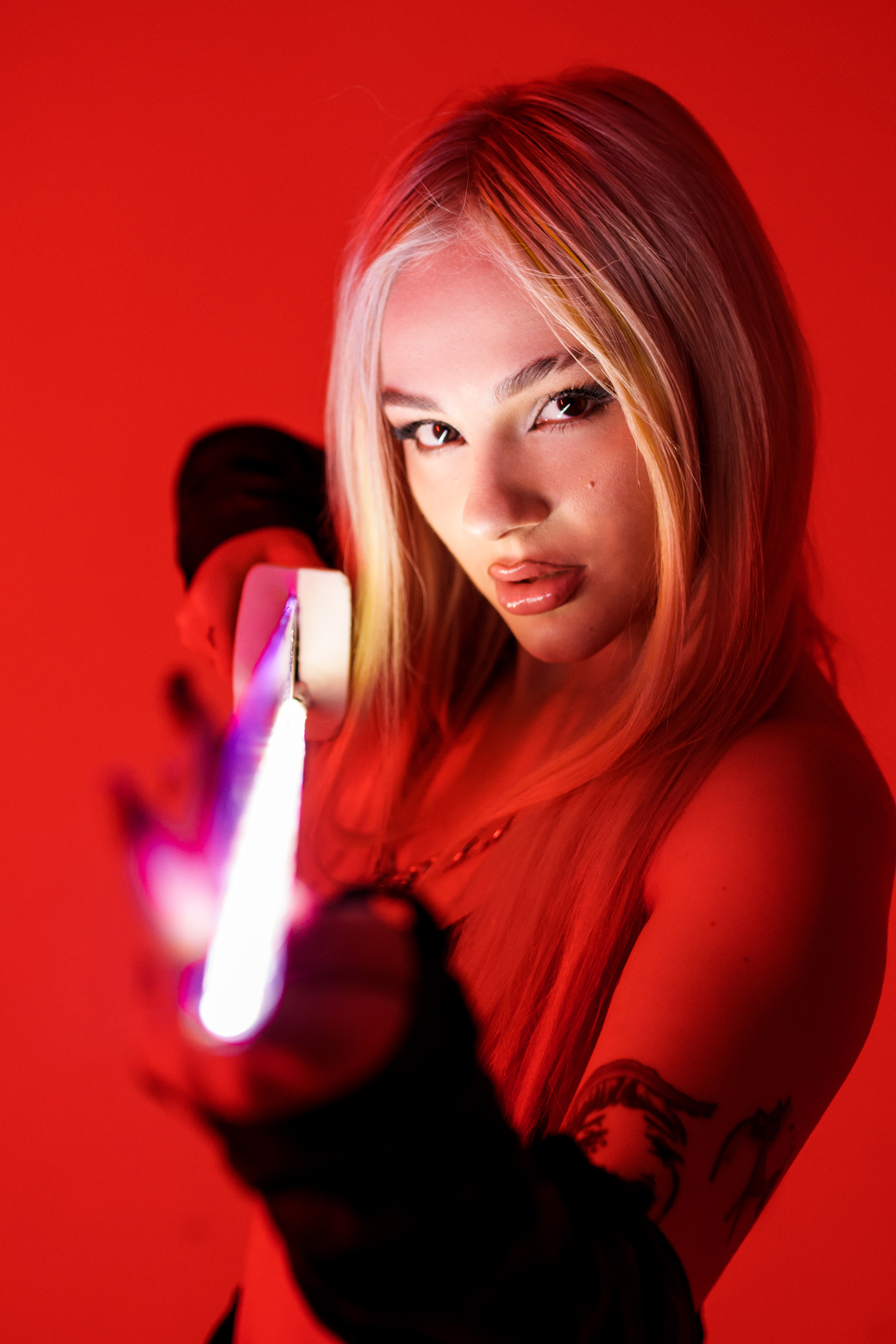
- Born: Beatriz Alcaide Santos; October 8, 1998 (age 28); Brazil
- Occupations: Singer; songwriter
- Years active: 2018–present
- Musical career
- Genres: Phonk; funk carioca; EDM; Latin trap
- Instrument: Vocals
- Label: oneRPM

Beatriz Alcaide Santos (born October 8, 1998), known professionally as Bibi Babydoll, is a Brazilian singer. She became internationally known through her hit "Automotivo Bibi Fogosa," which reached #1 on Spotify's Ukraine chart and also entered the charts in Brazil and Lithuania.

== Life and career ==
Beatriz Alcaide Santos was born in Curitiba and holds a degree in Advertising and Marketing. She began her music career in 2018, initially performing at small parties. Her debut single, "Alien", was released in 2018, marking the beginning of her journey in music. Since then, Beatriz has continued releasing new songs, and in May 2023, she introduced her first EP, titled Click!, featuring six tracks.

Her breakthrough came with the release of the single "Automotivo Bibi Fogosa" on June 22, 2023. The hit quickly captivated audiences, reaching the top of Spotify's Ukraine chart in July and also leading the Spotify Global Viral Chart, solidifying Beatriz as a rising name in international music.

Thanks to the success of "Automotivo Bibi Fogosa", the artist gained recognition in major national media outlets, including G1, Band, Billboard, and Jornal Estado de Minas. In Brazil, the song also entered the charts, reaching #75 on Billboard Brasil's singles chart.

On January 7, 2024, Bibi Babydoll was one of the featured artists on the Domingão TV show, hosted by Luciano Huck, where she performed a toned-down version of her hit "Automotivo Bibi Fogosa." In August 2024, Bibi performed at the Premios Monitor Latino in Colombia.

In 2023, she released the song "Bibi Phonk BR" in collaboration with DJ FKU. The track went viral in multiple countries, including Mexico, the United States, and Brazil.

Achievements:

- #1 on Spotify Ukraine with "Automotivo Bibi Fogosa" in 2023.
- Ranked #75 on Billboard Brasil Hot 100 with "Automotivo Bibi Fogosa" in 2023.

== Discography ==
- Click! (EP) (2023)

== Charts ==
Most Popular Song	Year	Positions		
Most Popular Song	Year	Billboard Hot 100 Brasil	Top 50 Spotify (Ucrânia)	Top 100 Global
Automotivo Bibi Fogosa	2023	75	1	82

== Filmography ==
- Domingão com Huck

== Awards and nominations ==
Year	Award	Category	Nomination	Result	Ref.
2023	BreakTudo Awards	Artista Revelação Nacional	Herself	Nominated	
2024	BreakTudo Awards	Artista em Ascensão Nacional	Herself	Won	
