= Wanessa Wolf =

Brazilian streamer

Wannesa Wolf
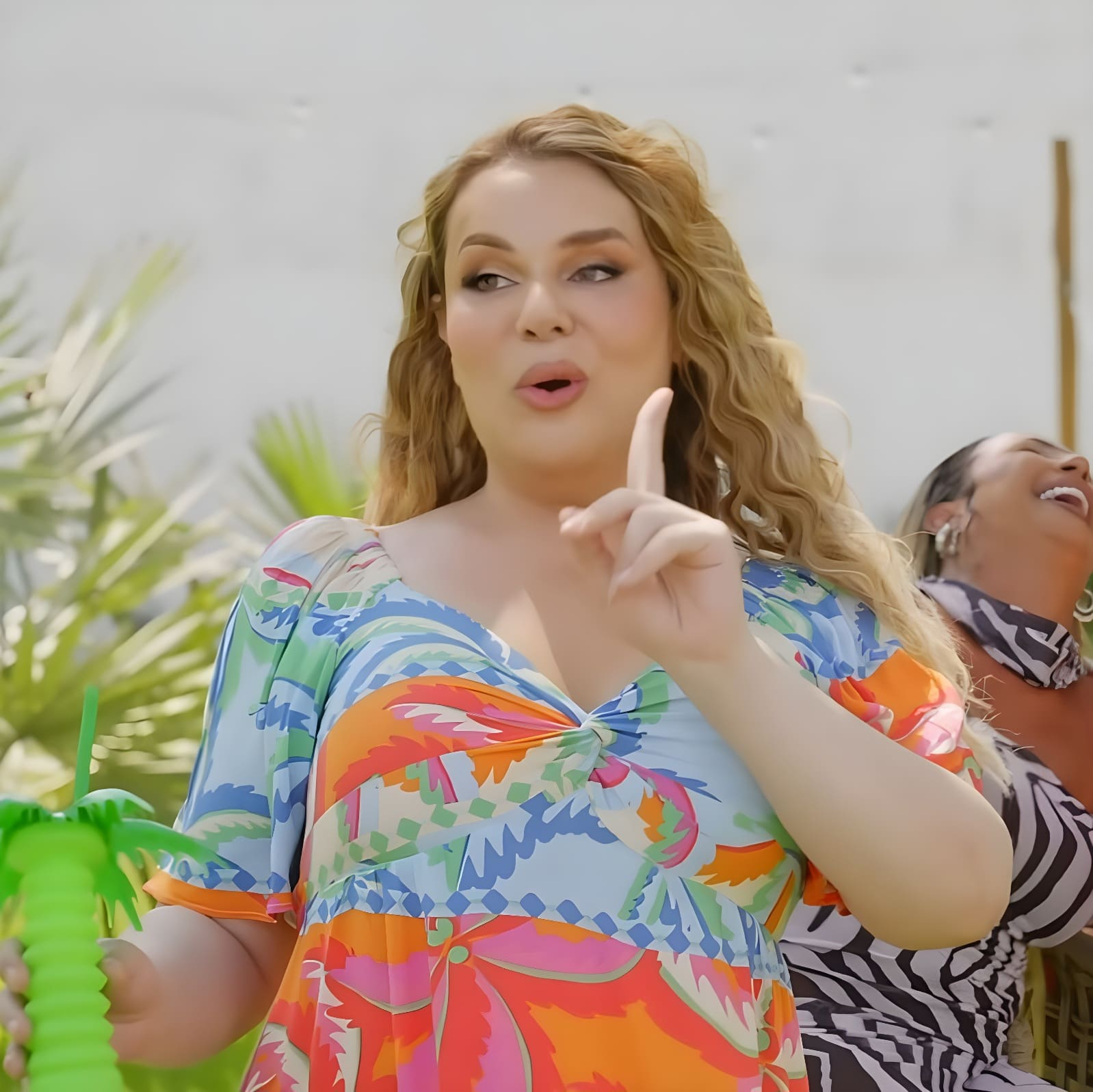
- Wolf in 2024
- Born: August 11, 1989 (age 37); Niterói, Rio de Janeiro
- Height: 1.73

Wanessa Ferreira de Sousa, best known as Wanessa Wolf (born August 11, 1989 in Niterói), is a Brazilian internet personality and streamer who became known for her gaming and comedy videos. She started her online career in 2018, when she started streaming live videos on Facebook.

Wolf was already a fan of video games, so she decided to turn this hobby into a career and started streaming live on the internet. She creates a wide range of content and, over time, has built up a significant following, with viral posts and memes on social media. Before her online career, Wolf worked as pharmacy assistant at her uncle's pharmacy.

In June 2022, she took part in the Facebook Pride Gaming event. In February 2023, she protested against the transphobic views of J. K. Rowling by streaming Hogwarts Legacy, raising 20 million real. She changed her name in August 2023.

== Awards and nominations ==
| Year | Awards | Category | Result | Ref. |
|---|---|---|---|---|
| 2020 | Prêmio POP Mais | Streamer do Karalhe! | Won | |

== Filmography ==
| Year | Title | Function | Notes |
|---|---|---|---|
| 2021 | Facebook Pride Gaming 2021 | Guest | |
| 2022 | Facebook Pride Gaming 2022 | Presenter | |
| 2023 | De Frente com Blogueirinha | Participant | Episode 10 of Season 2 |
| 2023 | Sente o Clima | Participant | Pilot episode |
| 2024 | Programa da Wanessa | Presenter | |
