= Ismeiow =

Brazilian drag queen and YouTuber

- Born: Ismael Serafim; Anápolis, Goiás, Brazil
- Occupations: Drag queen; YouTuber; digital influencer; makeup artist
- Spouse: Rafael Mendes (m. 2026)

YouTube information
- Channels: Ismeiow; Ismael; Ismeiow Shorts
- Years active: 2018–present
- Genre: Reaction
- Subscribers: 4.025 million (combined) (Note: Subscribers, broken down by channel: 1.18 million (Ismeiow) 2.30 million (Ismael) 0.565 million (Ismeiow Shorts))
- Views: 1.29 billion (combined) (Note: Views, broken down by channel: 128 million (Ismeiow) 954 million (Ismael) 213 million (Ismeiow Shorts))
- Last updated: 16 March 2026

Ismael Serafim, known professionally as Ismeiow (Portuguese pronunciation: [izˈmew]), is a Brazilian drag queen, YouTuber, digital influencer, and makeup artist. He became known on the Brazilian internet for his artistic makeup, influenced by his years of study in plastic and visual arts, as well as fashion-related work, including the independent production and customization of clothes and accessories.

In 2018, he created a YouTube channel focused on sharing personal experiences. Shortly thereafter, he shifted the channel's focus to his drag persona, Ismeiow. He later began publishing reaction videos, which contributed to an increase in his visibility. In 2023, he launched a second channel, titled Ismael, in which he appears outside of his drag persona; the channel went on to achieve greater viewership and audience reach than his main channel.

== Biography ==
=== Early life ===
A native of Anápolis, Ismael was introduced to the arts during his childhood. In a guest column for Sallve, he stated that at the age of eight he enrolled in a school of visual and plastic arts, where he remained for approximately five and a half years, studying art history, drawing, painting, sculpture, perspective, and charcoal drawing. During this period, he also worked as a face painter at children's parties and celebratory events.

In the same column, he noted that despite his years of study, he did not feel fully artistically fulfilled, as he considered his work insufficient. In the final year of the program, with approximately five months remaining before completion, he chose to withdraw from the course. After this period, he began directing his interest primarily toward artistic makeup.

=== Career ===
Ismael's first experience with online content creation occurred during his early adolescence, when he created a YouTube channel in partnership with a friend, inspired by videos on Vine. The project, however, was eventually discontinued.

Beginning in 2018, he started producing content independently, exploring customization, sewing, and artistic makeup. Of humble background, he initially created content using alternative materials, such as gouache paint and glitter glue, due to a lack of financial resources to purchase professional makeup.

Despite receiving no financial return at first, he continued producing videos for approximately two years without monetization. In an interview with Capricho magazine, Ismael stated that the channel began to be monetized in 2020, earning around 600 Brazilian reais every three months.

In 2022, he founded the audiovisual production company Ismeiow Video. The following year, he launched a second YouTube channel, titled Ismael, in which he appears outside of his drag persona. On this channel, he publishes videos commenting on topics that gain traction on social media, in addition to sharing personal experiences. The channel reached over one million subscribers within approximately one year, surpassing his main channel in viewership.

In June 2024, he hosted the Ismeiow's Open House, an event organized to celebrate the purchase of his residence, located in the Morumbi neighborhood of São Paulo. The program featured performances by drag queens Márcia Pantera, Natasha Princess, Shannon Skarlet, Hellena Borgys, Alyssah Hernandes, Sasha Zimmer, Frimes, and DesiRée Beck, and was broadcast live on Twitch, with an estimated audience of 65,000 viewers.

== Public image ==
At the age of 18, Ismael began receiving greater public attention after becoming involved in a controversy with Karen Bachini, an episode that resulted in coverage by the nationally circulated news portals G1 and Terra. From that period onward, he was involved in other online controversies. Over time, he adopted a more reserved stance regarding this type of public exposure and issued apologies for positions he had taken at the beginning of his career.

== Personal life ==
Raised in a Seventh-day Adventist family and of humble background, Ismael has openly identified as gay since the start of his online career. He publicly disclosed his sexual orientation on his YouTube channel, which led to his departure from the church he had been a member of.

On 28 August 2026, he married Rafael Mendes in a ceremony held at Thermas da Mata, a water park in Cotia, São Paulo.

== Filmography ==
=== Music video ===
| Year | Title | Artist | Ref. |
|---|---|---|---|
| 2024 | "Supostamente" | Bea Duarte | |

== Awards and nominations ==
| Year | Award | Category | Result | Ref. |
|---|---|---|---|---|
| 2026 | Prêmio Influency.me | Beauty (Note: Free translation of the category "Beleza" from Portuguese.) | Won | |
| 2025 | Prêmio Influency.me | Beauty (Note: Free translation of the category "Beleza" from Portuguese.) | Won | |
| 2025 | BreakTudo Awards | Internet Personality | Nominated | |
