= Cidade das Artes =

Coordinates: 22.999°S 43.366°W

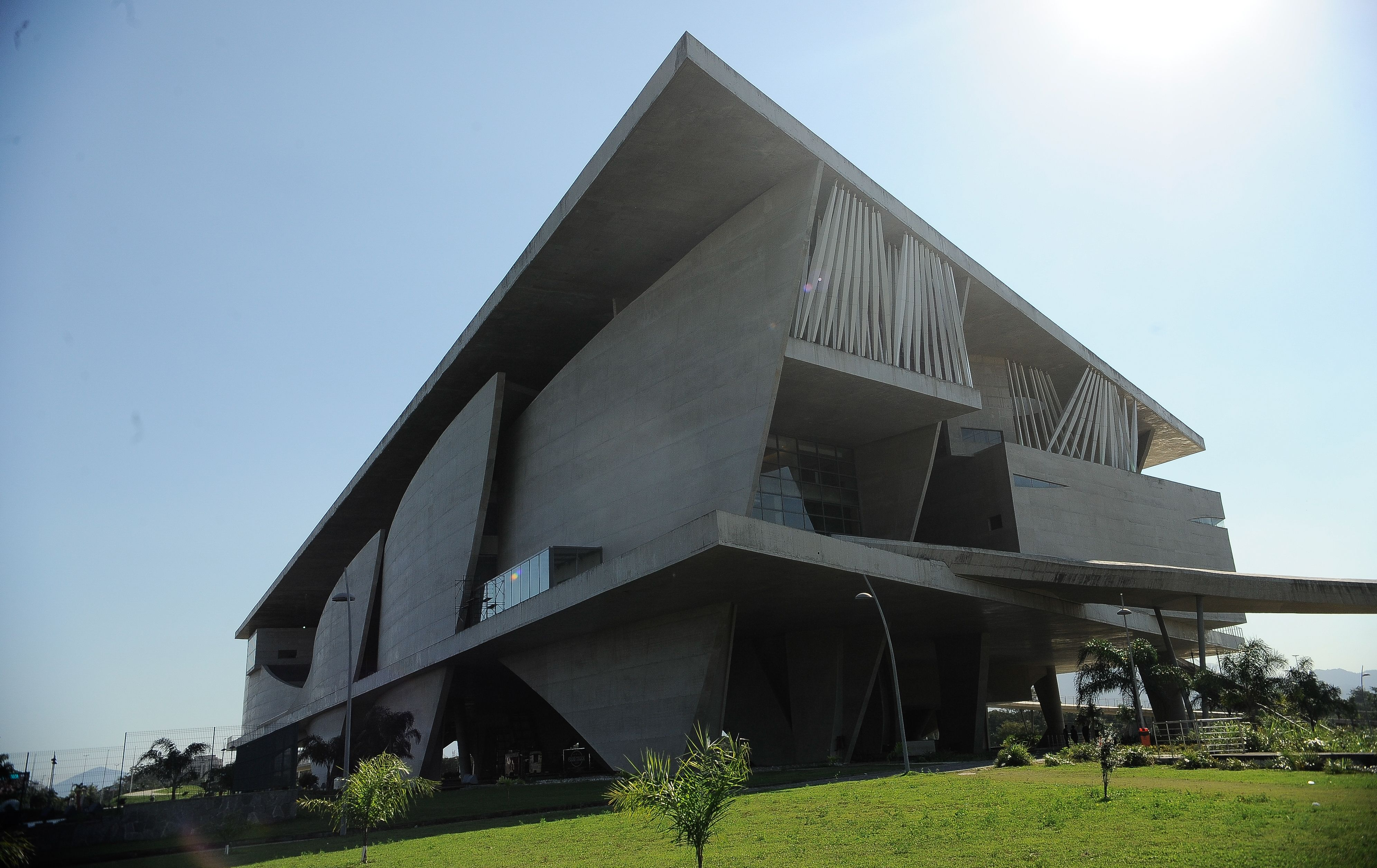
- Cidade da Música in Rio de Janeiro, 2015.
- Interactive map of the Cidade das Artes area

General information
- Type: Concert hall
- Architectural style: Contemporary architecture
- Location: Barra da Tijuca, Rio de Janeiro, Brazil
- Current tenants: Brazilian Symphony Orchestra
- Construction started: 2003
- Completed: 2012
- Inaugurated: 2013
- Cost: US$ 300 million (approx.)
- Owner: City of Rio de Janeiro

Technical details
- Floor area: 90,000m²

Design and construction
- Architect: Christian de Portzamparc

Website
- http://cidadedasartes.rio.rj.gov.br/

The Cidade das Artes (City of Arts) is a cultural complex located in Barra da Tijuca in the Southwest Zone of Rio de Janeiro, Brazil, which was originally planned to open in 2004, with the name of Cidade da Música (City of Music). The formal inauguration was in January 2013, with the musical "Rock in Rio".

The project's R$515 million (approx. US$250 million) to the city of Rio caused much controversy was originally budgeted at R$86 million.

As the new home of the Orquestra Sinfônica Brasileira (Brazilian Symphony Orchestra) and a main center for music, the Cidade das Artes is the largest modern concert hall in South America, with 1,780 seats. The complex spans approximately 90 thousand square metres and also features a chamber music hall, three theatres, and 12 rehearsal rooms. The terrace offers panoramic views of the neighbourhood of Barra da Tijuca.

The building was designed by the French architect Christian de Portzamparc and construction was funded by the city of Rio de Janeiro.
