= Bruno Gadiol =

Brazilian actor and singer (born 1998)

- Born: Bruno Gadiol Antoniassi; 6 June 1998 (age 28); São Paulo, SP, Brazil
- Occupations: Actor; singer
- Years active: 2012–present
- Height: 1.74 m (5 ft 9 in)

Bruno Gadiol Antoniassi (born 6 June 1998) is a Brazilian actor and singer. In 2013, he became known after winning the talent show on the program TV Xuxa, which formed the group KidX. In 2016, he was a semi-finalist on the fifth season of the talent show The Voice Brasil. In 2017, he made his acting debut as Guto in the twenty-fifth season of Malhação.

== Biography ==
Bruno was born on 6 June 1998 in the Paraíso neighborhood of São Paulo. At age eleven, his family moved to a condominium in Barueri, and he began attending Colégio Samarah in the neighboring city of Cotia.

In 2012, he formed the band Listras da Lombada with friends, performing pop and rock music at local events and music festivals. That same year, he starred in the plays O Mágico de Oz and an adaptation of Glee.

== Career ==
In March 2013, at age fourteen, Gadiol auditioned for a talent show on TV Xuxa hosted by Xuxa, which aimed to form a mixed-gender group of teenagers who could sing and dance, inspired by international acts such as S Club 7 and A*Teens. The competition received 2,000 applicants from across Brazil. On 3 August 2013, after three months of auditions and workshops, he was announced as one of the chosen members of the group KidX. The group recorded a self-titled album of pop covers, produced by Rick Bonadio and released by Sony Music on 18 November 2013. The project was discontinued in 2014 due to low investment and reception.

In 2016, he starred in the play Meninos e Meninas, in which he performed a homosexual kiss. That same year, he auditioned for season five of The Voice Brasil, advancing with three approvals after performing "Que Sorte a Nossa" by Matheus & Kauan, and chose to join Michel Teló's team. He reached the semi-finals, leaving the competition in the final round of Michel Teló's team against Mylena Jardim, who would become the season's winner.

In 2017, he made his television acting debut as the introverted pianist Guto in the twenty-fifth season of Malhação.

== Personal life ==
In 2015, he enrolled in advertising and publicity at Fundação Cásper Líbero but dropped out in his first semester to focus on acting, later graduating as a professional actor from Teatro Escola Macunaíma. He also studied musical theater at Teen Broadway in 2016. On 12 June 2018, he released a music video titled "Seu Costume" in partnership with Gabriel Nandes, using the occasion to publicly come out as gay.

== Discography ==
=== Studio albums ===
- Jovem (2022)

=== Singles ===
- "Boné Azul" (2015)
- "Seu Costume" (2018) (with Gabriel Nandes)
- "Me Amo" (2018)
- "Se Quer Saber" (2019) (Dreicon feat. Bruno Gadiol)
- "Desculpa, Mas Eu Só Penso Em Você" (2019)
- "Transborda" (2020)
- "Relacionamento Aberto" (2020)
- "Até Te Conhecer" (2020) (Cammie feat. Bruno Gadiol)
- "Metade" (2021)
- "Anestesiado" (2022)
- "Paixão vs Amor" (2022)
- "Jovem" (2022)

== Filmography ==
=== Television ===
Year	Title	Role	Notes
2013	TV Xuxa	Contestant	Segment: "KidX"
2016	The Voice Brasil	Contestant (5th place)	Season 5
2017–18	Malhação: Viva a Diferença	José Augusto Sampaio Neto (Guto)	
2020–24	As Five	José Augusto Sampaio Neto (Guto)	
2021–22	Sintonia	Levi Almeida	
2024	Luz	Lucas Ferreira	
2024	De Volta aos 15	Anderson	

=== Theatre ===
Year	Title	Role
2012	O Mágico de Oz	Scarecrow
2016	Meninos e Meninas	Leandro

== Awards and nominations ==
Year	Award	Category	Nomination	Result
2023	Prêmio Biscoito	Revelação do Vale	Jovem	Nominated
