= Blogueirinha =

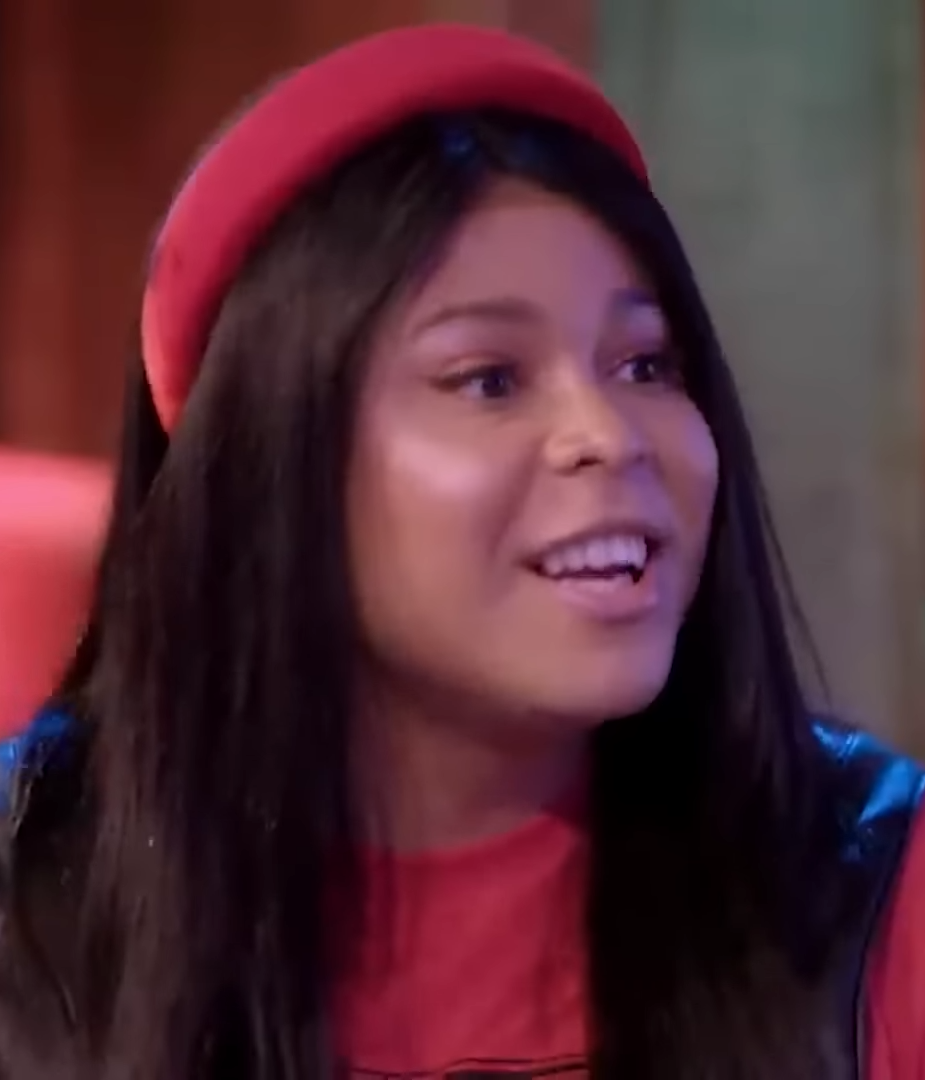
- Blogueirinha in October 2022
- First appearance: July 31, 2016
- Created by: Bruno Matos
- Portrayed by: Bruno Matos

In-universe information
- Full name: Xanaína Horta
- Alias: Blogueirinha de Merda
- Gender: Cisgender
- Occupation: Actress; Singer; Television presenter; YouTuber; Blogger; Medical technician (trained at University of São Paulo, Los Angeles); Model
- Family: Dia Estúdio
- Children: Xayennne "Xay"
- Religion: Candomblé, vegan
- Home: Dublin, Ireland; Los Angeles, USA; São Paulo, Brazil
- Nationality: American (naturalized Brazilian)

Xanaína Horta, better known as Blogueirinha (Los Angeles, July 31, 2000), is a fictional character portrayed as an influencer, television presenter, YouTuber, model, actress, medical technician trained at the University of São Paulo in Los Angeles, drag queen, singer, and songwriter. She is an American naturalized Brazilian. The character was created by Rio de Janeiro-based YouTuber Bruno Matos using satire. The character uses humor to parody the behavior of TV personalities and internet personalities, especially fashion bloggers.

Currently, Blogueirinha hosts her own talk show, titled De Frente com Blogueirinha, produced by DiaTV. She originally went by the name "Blogueirinha de Merda" ("Shitty Little Blogger"), but later removed the "de Merda" to attract sponsorships and brand deals. Some of her signature catchphrases include: "tutupom", "best in the world", "not sure if it's focusing", "my God, that's perfection", "unfortunately, it's not available in Brazil", and "for example: no example". Blogueirinha claims to live among celebrities in Los Angeles, United States, surrounded by luxury.

== Career ==
In Brazil, she debuted her own interview and entertainment show, Difícil de Focar, in November 2018 on Multishow's comedy channel on YouTube. Before that, she appeared behind the scenes of Música Boa Ao Vivo, a music program hosted by singer Iza on Multishow.

In 2018, Blogueirinha served as a judge on the first season of Corrida das Blogueiras, a reality show created by the YouTube channel Diva Depressão and produced by DiaTV. In the second and third seasons, she returned as a coach, offering commentary and advice to contestants during the challenges.

== Filmography ==
Year	Title	Role	Notes	Ref.
2018	Música Boa Ao Vivo	Reporter		
2018–2019	O Tumblr Tem Suas Regras	Blogueira dos Campos / Brunessa		
2018, 2024–present	Corrida das Blogueiras	Judge	Seasons 1 and 6	
2019–2021; 2023	Corrida das Blogueiras	Guest	Seasons 2, 3 and 5	
2018–2021	Vai Vegana	Herself	Documentary	
2018–2021	Difícil de Focar	Host		
2020; 2023	Bafo a Bafo	Host		
2020	Blognews	Host		
2021	A Vida Depois do Tombo da Jully	Herself	Documentary	
2021	#BeatsMandaJobs	Judge		
2021–present	De Frente com Blogueirinha	Host		
2023–present	Só Tem no Brasil	Host		
2024	Fantástico	Reporter	Segment: "Paredão da Blogueirinha"	
2024	Blogueirinha, a Feia	Blogueirinha		
2025	Vale Tudo	Herself	Episode: "18 April"	
2025	Show do Milhão	Guest	Episode: "17 August"	

== Discography ==
Studio albums
Year	Title	Notes	Ref.
2022	Quem Me Conhece Sabe	Released: January 13, 2022; Formats: Digital download, streaming; Label: Blogueirinha	
Soundtrack
2024	Blogueirinha, a Feia	Released: September 25, 2024; Formats: CD, Digital download, streaming; Label: Blogueirinha	

Singles
Title	Year	Album	Music video	Notes	Ref.
"Atentada"	2017	Not included in any album	Yes	—	—
"Zug Zug"	2019	Quem Me Conhece Sabe	Yes	—	
"João (MADAME B)"	2020	Not included in any album	Yes	Cover version of "Living for Love" by Madonna	
"Desculpas Veganas"	2020		Quem Me Conhece Sabe	Yes	—
"Tah Phod@"	2021	Not included in any album	Yes	—	
"Tah Phod@ (Trap Version)"	2021		Not included in any album	Yes	—
"Momentos"	2021		Not included in any album	No	—
"Eu Sabia"	2021	2022	Quem Me Conhece Sabe	Yes	—
"Cavalona"		2022	Quem Me Conhece Sabe	Yes	—
"Eu Sei Que Você Quer"		2022	Quem Me Conhece Sabe	Yes	—
"Homem Feio Também Trai"		2022	Quem Me Conhece Sabe	Yes	—
"Soy Solita"	2024	Not included in any album	No	—	

Música Multishow
Title	Year	Artist(s)	Music video	Notes	Ref.
"Toca se Toca (feat. Mc MSW)"	2019	T3ddy, Lucas Rangel, Blogueirinha	Yes	Parody of "Bola Rebola" by Anitta, recorded at Lollapalooza Brazil 2019	
"Foca (feat. T3ddy)"	2019	Blogueirinha	Yes	Parody of "Work" by Rihanna, recorded at Rock in Rio 2019	
