= Rio Webfest =

International film festival

- Location: Cidade das Artes, Rio de Janeiro, Brazil
- Founded: 2015
- Website: https://riowebfest.net/en/

Rio Webfest or International Festival Rio Webfest is a Brazilian web series festival, held annually since 2015 at the Cidade das Artes in Rio de Janeiro, considered the "largest web series festival in the world."

== History ==
In 2015, the first edition of the event took place with support from Dailymotion and production by Charllote Produções, from November 6 to 8 in the capital of Rio de Janeiro. The event has been officially recognized by the City Hall of Rio de Janeiro since its first edition.

The festival arrived in Brazil in 2015, when internet productions began to gain traction, with the goal of recognizing the work of independent artists’ productions. It has awarded and nominated several artists, including Guilherme Seta, Debora Fallabela, Viih Tube, and Manu Gavassi. In 2021, it took place from November 25 to 28 at Cidade das Artes and showcased over 200 web series and other web-based products to the public. In 2024, the event was presented by the Ministry of Culture of Brazil and Petrobras.

== Editions ==
Year	Date	Place	City	Ref.
2015	June 11, 2015	Cidade das Artes	Rio de Janeiro	
2016	December 1–4, 2016	Cidade das Artes	Rio de Janeiro	
2017	November 16–19, 2017	Cidade das Artes	Rio de Janeiro	
2018	November 18, 2018	Cidade das Artes	Rio de Janeiro	
2019	November 18, 2019	Cidade das Artes	Rio de Janeiro	
2020	November 11–14, 2020	Cidade das Artes	Rio de Janeiro	
2021	November 25–28, 2021	Cidade das Artes	Rio de Janeiro	
2022	November 24–26, 2022	Cidade das Artes	Rio de Janeiro	
2023	November 25–28, 2023	Cidade das Artes	Rio de Janeiro	
2024	November 29–30 and December 1–2, 2024	Cidade das Artes	Rio de Janeiro	
2025	November 28–December 1, 2025	Cidade das Artes	Rio de Janeiro	

== Awards ==
- Melhor Série de Comédia
- Melhor Roteiro (Comédia)
- Melhor Direção (Comédia)
- Melhor Ator (Comédia)
- Melhor Série Dramática
- Melhor Atriz (Drama)
- Melhor Ator (Drama)
- Melhor Série de Ação/Sci-fi/Terror
- Melhor Atriz (Ação/Sci-fi/Terror)
- Melhor Ator (Ação/Sci-fi/Terror)
- Melhor Série Animada
- Melhor Teatro Filmado
- Melhor Série de Documentário
- Melhor Série Educacional
- Melhor Série de Diversidade
- Melhor Videoclipe
- Melhor Série Musical
- RIOWF Incentivo a Produção Digital Brasileira
- RIOWF Incentivo a Produção Digital Internacional
- Melhor Edição

== See also ==
- Cinema of Brazil
