= Gustavo Mioto =

Brazilian singer-songwriter (born 1997)

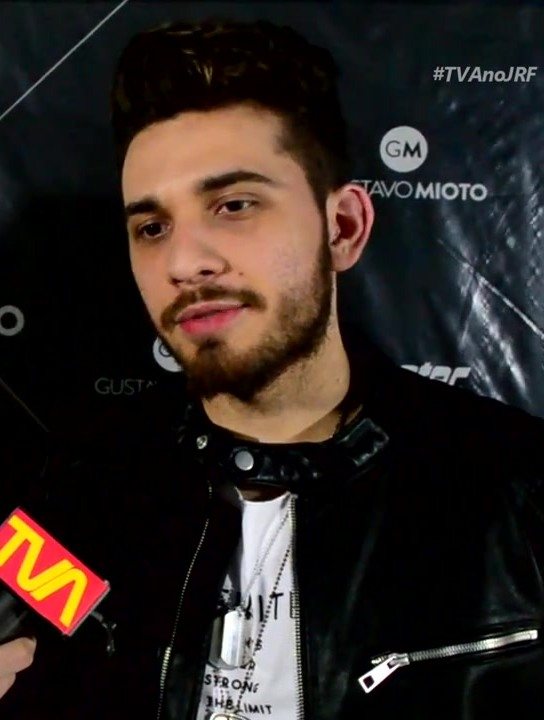
- Mioto in 2018
- Born: Gustavo Pieroni Mioto; 12 March 1997 (age 29); Votuporanga, SP, Brazil
- Notable work: discography
- Height: 1.80 m (5 ft 11 in)
- Father: Marcos Mioto
- Awards: Awards and nominations
- Musical career
- Genres: sertanejo; arrocha; pop
- Occupations: singer; songwriter; guitarist
- Instruments: voice; acoustic guitar; electric guitar
- Years active: 2012–present
- Label: Universal Music Brasil (2020–present)
- Website: www.gustavomioto.com.br

Gustavo Pieroni Mioto (born 12 March 1997) is a Brazilian singer and songwriter.

He started his career in 2012 with his debut album Fora de Moda. Mioto became known nationally in Brazil with the song “Impressionando os Anjos”, his first to reach the top position of the Top 100 Brazil chart. His song “Com ou Sem Mim” was the most played song on Brazilian radio in 2020.

== Biography ==
Mioto was born and raised in Votuporanga. He is the son of Jussara Pieroni and Marcos Mioto, one of the biggest entrepreneurs of sertanejo music in Brazil. He has a younger sister named Leticia.

During his teenage years, Mioto worked as a gas station attendant. After finishing high school, he started studying computer engineering at college, but left the course after six months.

=== Personal life ===
In September 2018, he started dating digital influencer Thaynara OG. The relationship came to an end in August 2019. In January 2020, the couple resumed dating after four months apart. In August 2020, the end of the relationship was confirmed. In June 2023, Mioto's relationship to Ana Castela became public.

== Career ==
=== 2012–2016: Fora de Moda and Ciclos ===
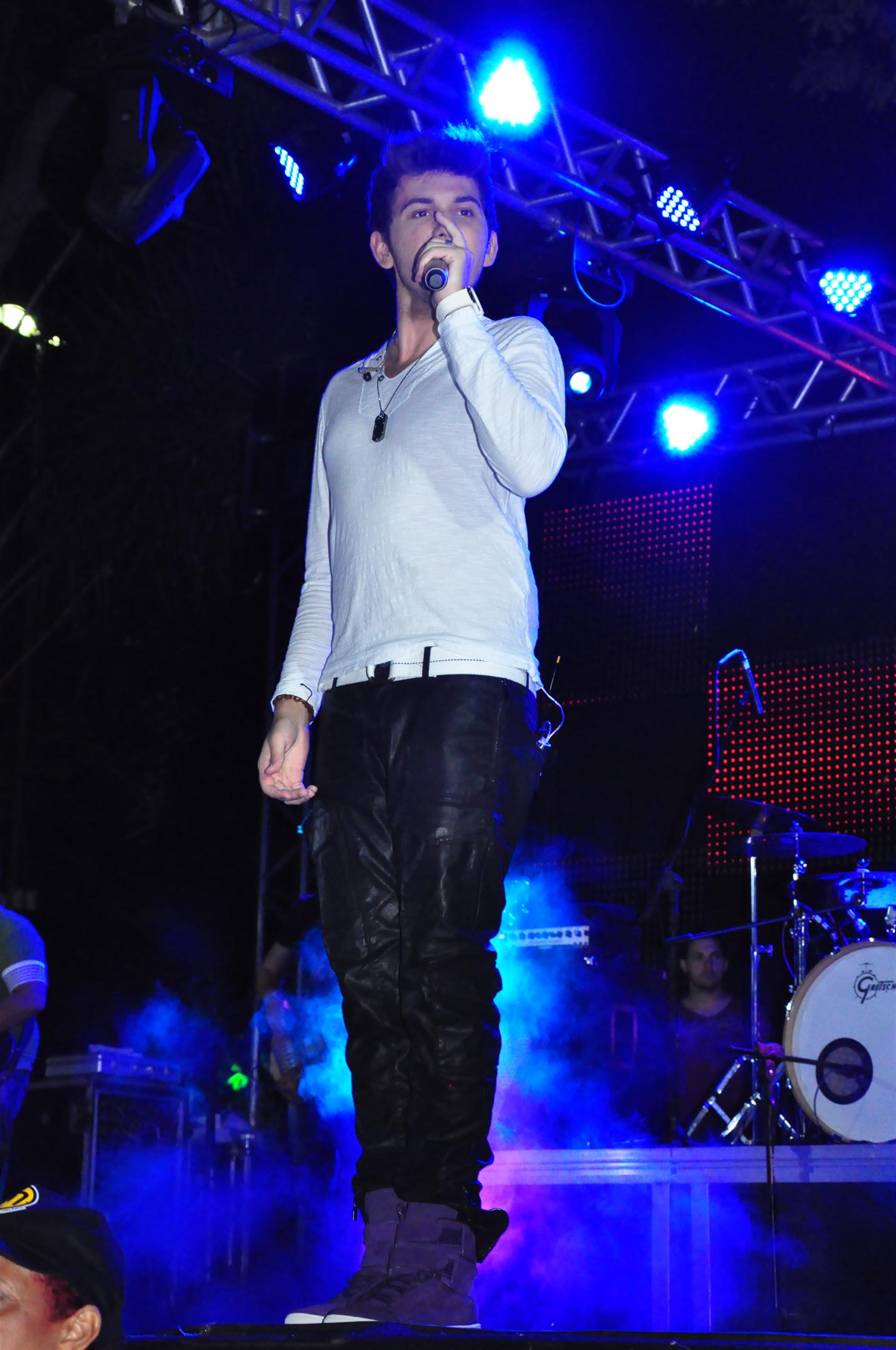
Mioto during the 2013 New Year celebrations in Votuporanga

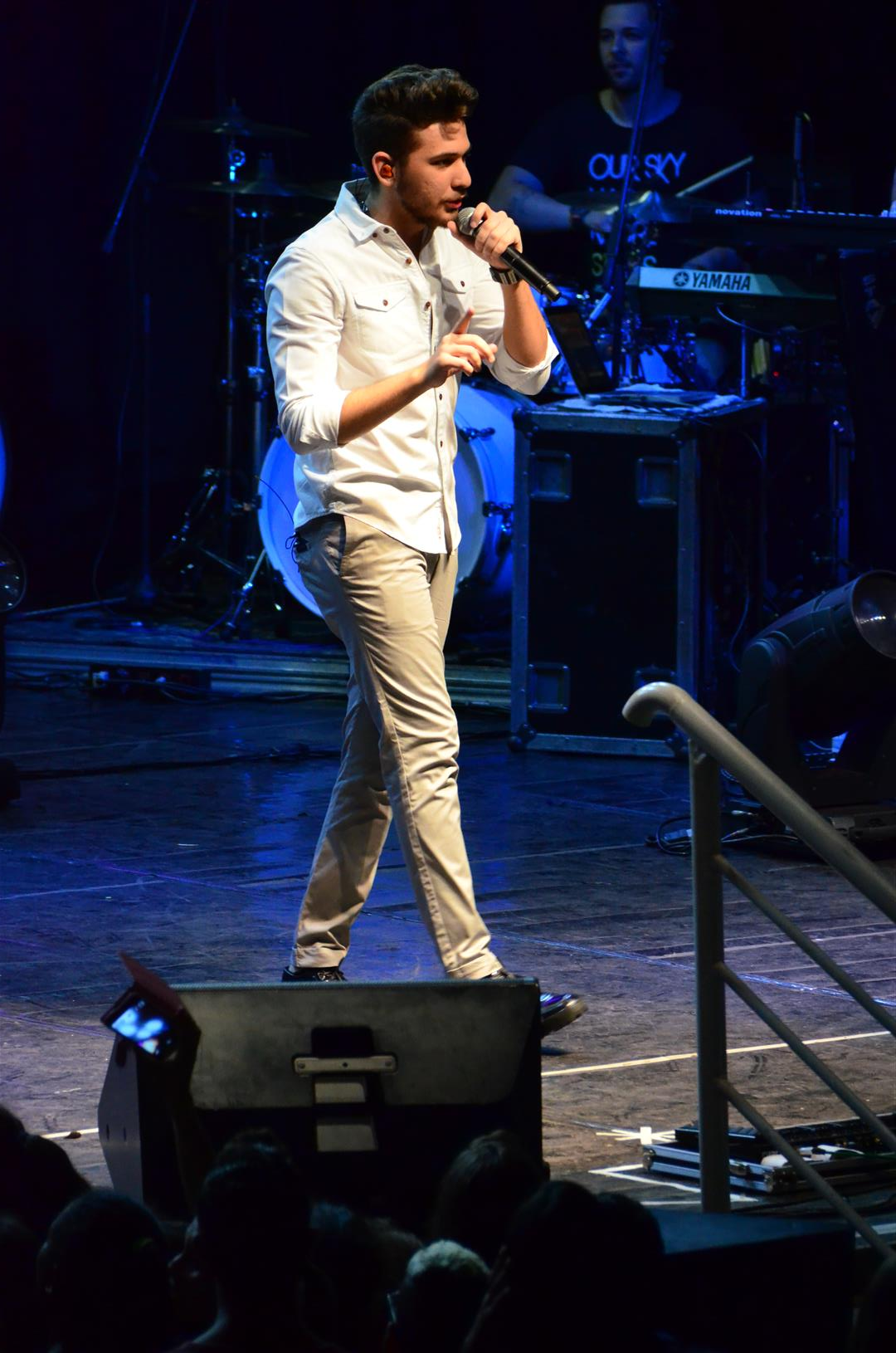
Mioto during the Votuporanga Christmas Festival (2015)

Gustavo Mioto started playing the guitar at the age of 6 and soon enrolled in a music conservatory in his hometown. At the age of 10, he composed “É Você Quem Vai Chorar”, his first song. Still at that age, he started posting videos of his songs on YouTube and playing at parties of friends and acquaintances in the city. At the age of 13, he joined the band Oxigênio from São José do Rio Preto, with the aim of gaining experience, meeting a much more demanding audience. The band toured Brazil doing shows at proms, Hawaii, country and 15th birthday partys.

In 2012, he entered the studio to record his first album entitled Fora de Moda by the Play Mix label, which had as its only single his first working song "Ela Não Gosto de Mim". In January 2014, she released "Eu Gosto de Você" as a single, featuring singer Claudia Leitte. The song spent weeks among the most played on the best radio stations in the country.

In October 2014, he recorded his first DVD entitled Ciclos in his hometown Votuporanga, which featured guest appearances by singers Luan Santana, Cristiano Araújo and the duo Bruninho & Davi. The DVD was released in June 2015 on the main digital platforms and stores throughout Brazil and had the singles "Lembra" and "Mãos Ao Alto Coração". After the launch of the DVD, Gustavo gained space in the media, participating in several television programs. On 15 March 2016, he released the clip for "3 da Manhã", which featured actress and blogger Flavia Pavanelli. The single was among the 15 most played on radio stations across the country.

In November 2016, he released the song "Impressionando os Anjos" on radio stations of Brazil. The song was among the most played songs in the country, ranking 1st on the Hot 100 of Billboard Brasil.

=== 2017–2020: Referências and Ao Vivo em São Paulo / SP ===
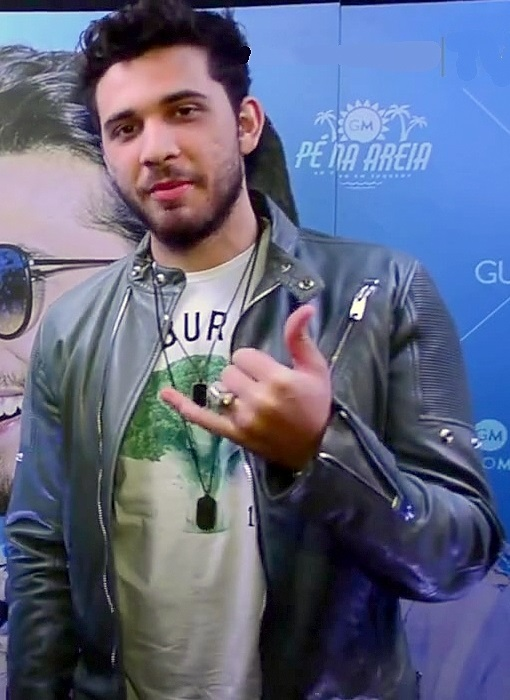
Mioto granting an interview during the Limeira Rodeo (2019)

On 19 May 2017, he launched the References project in honor of his musical references, with the song "Querido, Eterno amor", which featured the sertanejo duo Bruno & Marrone. On 10 July 2017, he released his new single, "Relógio". The song debuted at number 1 on the Billboard Brasil Hot 100.

In October 2017, he recorded his second DVD, Ao Vivo em São Paulo / SP, which featured guest appearances by singers Jorge & Mateus, Anitta, Gusttavo Lima and Maiara & Maraisa. The DVD was released on March 29, 2018, with a concert at the Villa Country concert hall. On November 17, "Anti-Amor", the first song on the DVD, was released with the participation of the sertanejo duo Jorge & Mateus. In July 2018, he released the track "Contramão" on the radio stations as a single, which reached 3rd place on the Hot 100 of Billboard Brasil.

In May 2018, he received four certifications from ONErpm Brasil for the success of the songs "Impressionando os Anjos", which received a double platinum record, "Anti-Amor", which received a platinum record for 67 million plays, "Coladinha em Mim", which received a platinum record for 55 million plays, and a gold record for the 190 million plays of his album Ao Vivo em São Paulo / SP. On 7 December 2018, he released the song "Solteiro Não Trai", his new single. On 22 March 2019, he released her first EP named Pé Na Areia, with seven new tracks. On May 6, he released "Fake News" as the only single from the EP, which reached number one on the Top 100 in Brazil.

=== 2020–2021: Ao Vivo em Fortaleza, Mistura and Inconfundível ===
In February 2020, he released his third DVD named Ao Vivo em Fortaleza, which featured singers Wesley Safadão and Xand Avião and had the song "Com ou Sem Mim" as a single, released in November 2019.

In April 2020, during the COVID-19 pandemic, Mioto did a solidarity live called Pé em Casa whose cash proceeds were transferred to UNICEF to use to fight the pandemic. In June of the same year, he promoted his second charity live, called São João do Mioto, which had influencers Thaynara OG, Rafa Kalimann and Camila Loures as ambassadors of the project, as well as the participation of comedian Matheus Ceará.

In November, the singer announced that after many years of making releases through ONErpm, he had signed a contract with Universal Music Brasil stating that it was "one of the most important steps in his career." In December, Mioto launched the project Mistura - Volume 1, which mixes sertanejo and forró, and features artists like Dorgival Dantas, Calcinha Preta and Raí Saia Rodada.

Mioto was one of those selected in the "Music" category of the 2020 Forbes 30 Under 30 list.

In March 2021, his song "Despedida de Casal" reached number one in the Brazilian radio charts. On 19 August 2021, Mioto released the DVD Inconfundível with nine unreleased songs, including "Restrição Sentimental" featuring Marília Mendonça. The album debuted in the top 10 most listened to on streaming platform Spotify's global ranking.

== Discography ==
Studio albums

- Fora de Moda (2012)
- Inconfundível (2021)

Live albums and DVDs

- Ciclos (2015)
- Ao Vivo em São Paulo / SP (2017)
- Ao Vivo em Fortaleza (2020)
- 10 Anos Ao Vivo em Recife (2023)

== Awards and nominations ==
| Year | Award | Category | Recipient(s) and nominee(s) | Result | Ref. |
|---|---|---|---|---|---|
| 2017 | Meus Prêmios Nick | Breakthrough Artist | Himself | Nominated | |
| 2017 | Multishow Brazilian Music Award | Fiat Argo Experimente | Himself | Nominated | |
| 2019 | Prêmio Jovem Brasileiro | Aposta PJB | Himself | Nominated | |
| 2019 | Prêmio Jovem Brasileiro | Best Male Singer | Himself | Nominated | |
| 2019 | Prêmio Jovem Brasileiro | Bombastic music video | "Solteiro Não Trai" | Nominated | |
| 2019 | Prêmio Jovem Brasileiro | Hit do Ano | "Solteiro Não Trai" | Won | |
| 2020 | Meus Prêmios Nick | Hit Nacional Favorito | "Com ou Sem Mim" | Nominated | |
| 2022 | MTV Millennial Awards Brazil | Best National Collaboration | "Afogado" (Gustavo Mioto and Ludmilla) | Nominated | |
