= Box Brazil Play =

- Company type: Subsidiary
- Website type: OTT video streaming platform
- Area served: Brazil
- Owner: Box Brazil
- Key people: Cícero Aragon
- Parent: Music Box Brazil, Prime Box Brazil, Travel Box Box Brazi, Fashion TV
- Website: boxbrazilplay.tv.br
- Advertising: Yes
- Registration: Required
- Launched: April 20, 2017; 9 years ago
- Current status: Active

Box Brazil Play is a Brazilian streaming platform. It is the first streaming platform dedicated exclusively to national content, in addition to content, the platform also broadcasts live programming from several channels, including SBT, CNN Brasil, RedeTV! and Record News. The streaming platform was launched in April 2017 and is operated by the Box Brazil group in partnership with Now from Claro Brasil, the development of the platform was carried out by Container Media Corp.

== History ==
The streaming platform was launched on April 20, 2017, only for some users in the beta version, in May of the same year it was launched only for Box Brazil subscribers and on February 4, 2021, it was launched without restrictions throughout Brazil.

In August 2020, Box Brazil signed a contract with new broadcasters and also began broadcasting programming from BandSports, BandNews, Band, AgroMais, Sabor & Arte, Arte 1, SBT, Record News and RecordTV.

In February 2021, Claro announced a partnership with Box Brazil Play to make all platform content available to now subscribers, the operator had already done this with STARZPLAY. With the launch on a larger scale, Box Brazil Play made available more than 1500 VOD contents and 20 national TV channels, including Prime Box Brazil, Music Box Brazil, Travel Box Brazil, FashionTV, CNN Brasil, COM Brasil TV.

== Content ==
The platform has exclusive content from several national production companies, making available films, documentaries, series and concerts by Brazilian artists, in addition to including original programming from the Music Box, FashionTV and Prime Box Brazil channels. Among the productions available in the streaming catalog are: A Estrada 47, Amores Urbanos, Paula, Tribos & Impérios, and Through Sombra Não.

== Content provider channels ==
- BandSports
- BandNews
- Record News
- CNN Brasil
- SBT
- RecordTV
- RedeTV!
- Band
- Fish TV
- AgroMais
- Canal Rural
- Canal do Criador
- Sabor & Arte
- Travel Box Brazil
- Arte 1
- Prime Box Brazil
- Music Box Brazil
- FashionTV
- Yeeaah
- COM Brasil TV
- TV Brasil 2
- TV Escola
- TV Senado
