= BreakTudo Awards =

Annual Brazilian pop culture awards

- Current: BreakTudo Awards 2026
- Awarded for: Honoring the best in music, television, and internet content
- Location: São Paulo, Brazil
- Country: Brazil
- First award: 2016; 10 years ago
- Website: breaktudoawards.com

Television/radio coverage
- Network: Telemilênio (2020–present); Box Brazil Play (2021–present); Yeeaah TV (2021–present); Prime Video, Claro TV+ (2025)

The BreakTudo Awards (BTAs) is a Brazilian award show that recognizes national and international artists from music, television, and internet content creation. Created in 2016, the event is broadcast annually on the streaming platform Box Brazil Play, on the Telemilênio channel on YouTube, and on Yeaaah TV. In 2025, the event will also be broadcast in Brazil through Prime Video and Claro TV+, via Box Brazil Play.

The winners of the categories are determined through public voting, with the exception of the Brazilian Pop Icon category, created in 2020 as an honorary award. In this category, the honoree is announced directly without voting.

== Background ==
The BreakTudo Awards was established in 2016. In 2018 and 2019, winners were announced by YouTubers Tiago Fabri and Alexandre Duarte on the Virou Festa channel. In 2019, the South Korean group Blackpink received the highest number of awards, winning four categories.

In 2020, the awards were hosted by YouTuber and singer Escarião, with a broadcast on the Telemilênio channel on YouTube. That edition included musical performances by Gabi Martins, Gio Bianco, Francinne, and MTK. A special category titled "Brazilian Pop Icon" was introduced that year, with Anitta receiving the inaugural award.

In 2021, the event was hosted by actor Bernardo Velasco and journalist Gerf Barone. Performances included Valesca Popozuda and former The Voice Brasil contestant Renan Cavolik. Singer Ivete Sangalo received the Brazilian Pop Icon award as its second honoree. In tribute, Ludmila Lira performed "Quando a Chuva Passar", a song originally released by Sangalo in 2005. The broadcast was carried by Box Brazil Play, Telemilênio, Yeaah TV, Angola Cables, CNDTV, and TV Cidade.

In 2022, the event was hosted by Emanuela Nogueira and Gerf Barone, with performances by Tinn, Igor Oggy, Gabi Martins, and Duda Kropf. Luan Santana received the Brazilian Pop Icon award.

In 2023, the honoree was singer Ludmilla. The edition included performances by Brazilian artists Anara, DiGrecco, and Agatha, as well as an international performance by the group BINI. The event took place in São Paulo, Brazil.

In 2024, the ceremony took place in São Paulo and included musical performances by Ethan, Lucas Pretti, and Matheus Arruda. Pabllo Vittar received the Brazilian Pop Icon award. Jung Kook, Joelma, Jimin, BINI, and Juliette each received two awards, the highest number among nominees.

The 2025 ceremony was held on November 18 in São Paulo and was hosted by Gerf Barone, Emanuela Nogueira, and Ryan Berger. Anitta led the nominations with six and won two awards, including Brazilian Music Video of the Year for “Romeo.” Other multiple award winners included BINI, Gustavo Mioto, Joelma, Felca, and FreenBecky, each receiving two awards. The band Jota Quest was honored with the Brazilian Pop Icon award.

Among the international winners were Jimin for International Male Artist, Jennie for International Female Artist, the group Enhypen for International Male Group, and Katseye for International New Artist.

== List of Ceremonies ==
Year	Date	Host city	Hosts	Brazilian Pop Icon Honoree
2018	October 21	Virtual	Tiago Fabri, Alexandre Duarte	—
2019	October 20	Virtual	Tiago Fabri, Alexandre Duarte	—
2020	October 24	São Paulo	Escarião	Anitta
2021	October 21	Nova Friburgo	Bernardo Velasco, Gerf	Ivete Sangalo
2022	November 22	São Paulo	Emanuela Nogueira, Gerf Barone	Luan Santana
2023	November 15	São Paulo	Gerf Barone, Emanuela Nogueira	Ludmilla
2024	November 18	São Paulo	Gerf Barone, Emanuela Nogueira	Pabllo Vittar
2025	November 18	São Paulo	Gerf Barone, Emanuela Nogueira, and Ryan Berger	Jota Quest

== Performances ==
Year	Performers (chronologically)
2020	Gabi Martins, Gio Bianco, Pedro Arcafra, MTK, Escarião, Riell, Nanda Loren, Gerf, Ricking, Running Lights, Francinne
2021	Valesca Popozuda, Gabi Lins, Marcos Veiga, MC Jessi, Tiago Acosta, Renan Cavolik
2022	Gabi Martins, Duda Kropf, Tinn, Julies e Viegas, Igor Oggy, Manola
2023	BINI, DiGrecco, Anara, Agatha
2024	Lucas Pretti, ETHAN, Matheus Arruda
2025	BGYO, Júlia Rezende, Traemme

== Reception and impact ==
=== Social media engagement ===
According to internal data from X (formerly Twitter) published on its official blog, the BreakTudo Awards was one of the five most-mentioned award shows on the platform in Argentina in 2021, based on the total volume of tweets using its hashtag. It was listed alongside international ceremonies like the iHeartRadio Music Awards, MTV MIAW Awards, SEC Awards, and the Grammy Awards. The blog noted how the platform connected music stars with the community and how fans supported their idols "hashtag by hashtag" during these events.

=== Recognition in Brazil ===
In October 2023, the BreakTudo Awards was nominated in the "Incentive to Brazilian Digital Production" category at the Rio WebFest, a festival presented by the Brazilian Ministry of Culture.

=== Coverage in international media ===
Billboard Philippines published articles on the award show in both 2023 and 2024. Its coverage reported on the nominations and victories of Filipino artists BINI, SB19, and BGYO, alongside international music artists such as Chappell Roan, Jung Kook, Lisa, and Stray Kids. In its September 2024 coverage, El País referred to the BreakTudo Awards as an international award show that "promotes the most prominent and emerging figures in entertainment and pop culture." In 2025, the awards were reported on by international outlets including South Korea's public broadcaster KBS, and the newspaper The Chosun Ilbo, which reported on ENHYPEN's victory for the 'International Male Group' award.

=== Role in international cultural recognition ===
On June 11, 2025, the House of Representatives of the Philippines approved House Resolution No. 2341, acknowledging the achievements of the Filipino pop groups SB19, BINI, and BGYO for their victories at the 2024 BreakTudo Awards.

The resolution recognized the artists' achievements at the Brazilian award show, identifying the BreakTudo Awards as the international ceremony where they were honored. It described the event as having been "founded in 2016" with a mission "to celebrate the most prominent and emerging stars in the global entertainment and pop culture scene."

=== Television and radio coverage in the Philippines ===
In 2023, the Filipino television network News5 aired a report on the winners of the BreakTudo Awards in the Philippines through its news program Frontline Tonight. The segment covered the victories of the P-pop groups SB19 and Bini. In 2024, the BreakTudo Awards received television coverage in the Philippines through several news programs, including TV Patrol (ABS-CBN),MBC TV Network News (DZRH News Television), and both Frontline Pilipinas and Frontline Tonight (News5). Television coverage in the Philippines included reports on Filipino nominees and winners such as SB19, BINI, and BGYO, alongside mentions of international artists featured in the award show. . In addition to television coverage, the event was also covered by radio stations Radio Mindanao Network and True FM,

In September 2025, the BreakTudo Awards continued to receive coverage in the Philippines, with TV Patrol and MBC TV Network News once again reporting on the nominations of Filipino artists.
