= 2006 =

2006 in various calendars
- Gregorian calendar: 2006; MMVI
- Ab urbe condita: 2759
- Armenian calendar: 1455; ԹՎ ՌՆԾԵ
- Assyrian calendar: 6756
- Baháʼí calendar: 162–163
- Balinese saka calendar: 1927–1928
- Bengali calendar: 1412–1413
- Berber calendar: 2956
- British Regnal year: 54 Eliz. 2 – 55 Eliz. 2
- Buddhist calendar: 2550
- Burmese calendar: 1368
- Byzantine calendar: 7514–7515
- Chinese calendar: 乙酉年 (Wood Rooster); 4703 or 4496 — to — 丙戌年 (Fire Dog); 4704 or 4497
- Coptic calendar: 1722–1723
- Discordian calendar: 3172
- Ethiopian calendar: 1998–1999
- Hebrew calendar: 5766–5767
- Hindu calendars
- Vikram Samvat: 2062–2063
- Shaka Samvat: 1927–1928
- Kali Yuga: 5106–5107
- Holocene calendar: 12006
- Igbo calendar: 1006–1007
- Iranian calendar: 1384–1385
- Islamic calendar: 1426–1427
- Japanese calendar: Heisei 18 (平成１８年)
- Javanese calendar: 1938–1939
- Juche calendar: 95
- Julian calendar: Gregorian minus 13 days
- Korean calendar: 4339
- Minguo calendar: ROC 95 民國95年
- Nanakshahi calendar: 538
- Thai solar calendar: 2549
- Tibetan calendar: ཤིང་མོ་བྱ་ལོ་ (female Wood-Bird); 2132 or 1751 or 979 — to — མེ་ཕོ་ཁྱི་ལོ་ (male Fire-Dog); 2133 or 1752 or 980
- Unix time: 1136073600 – 1167609599

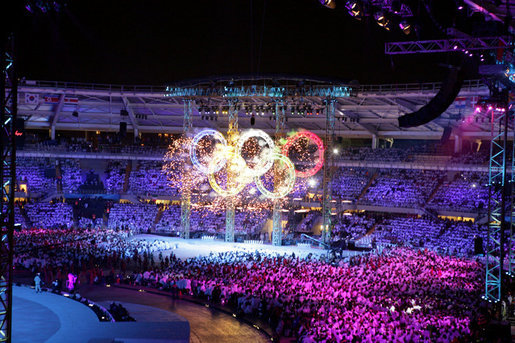
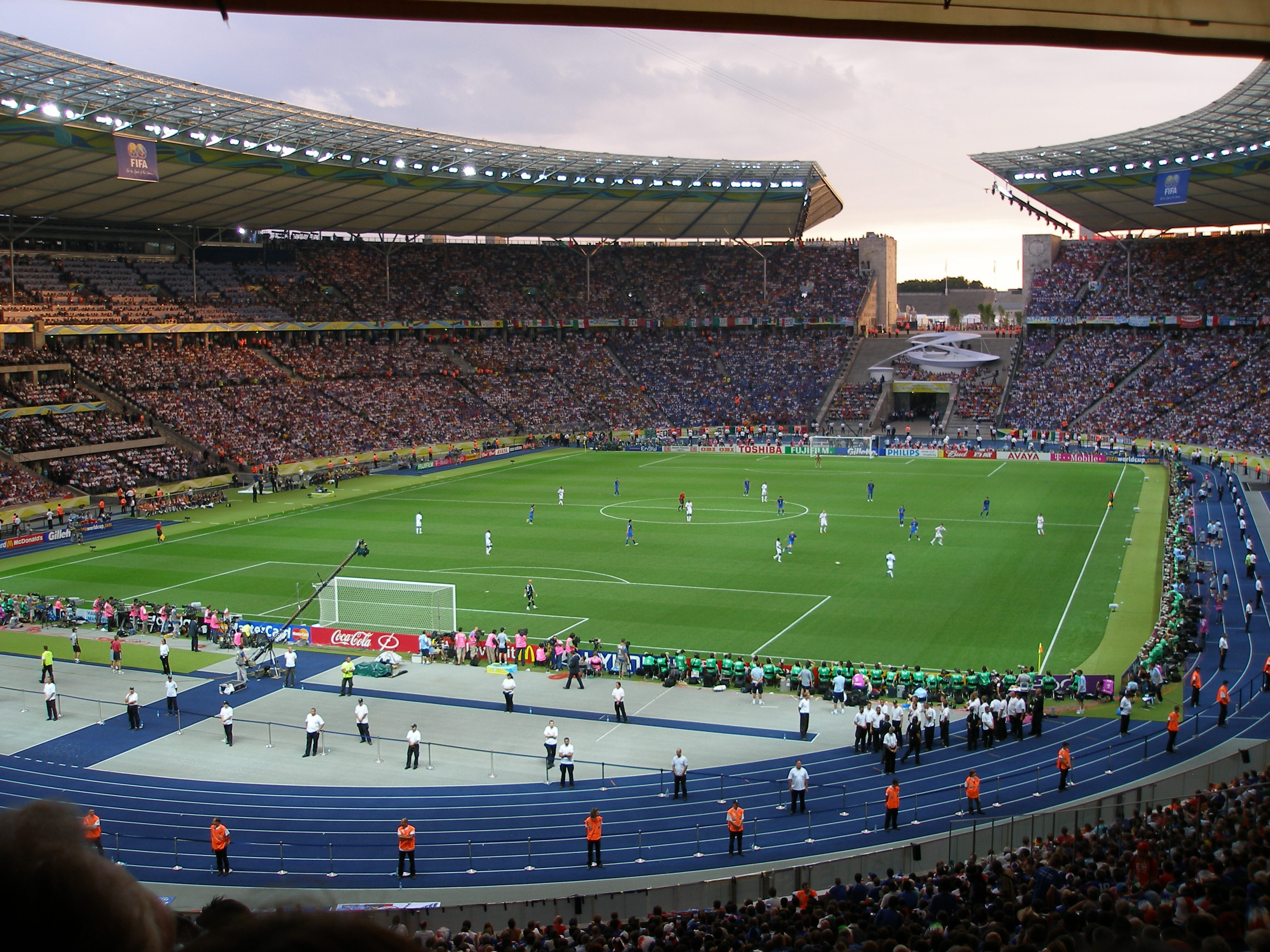
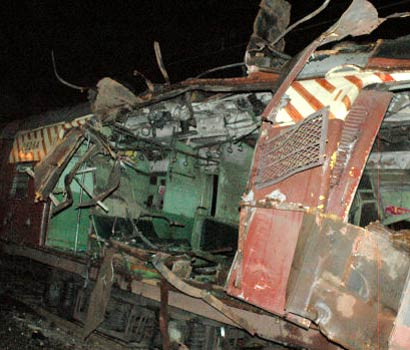
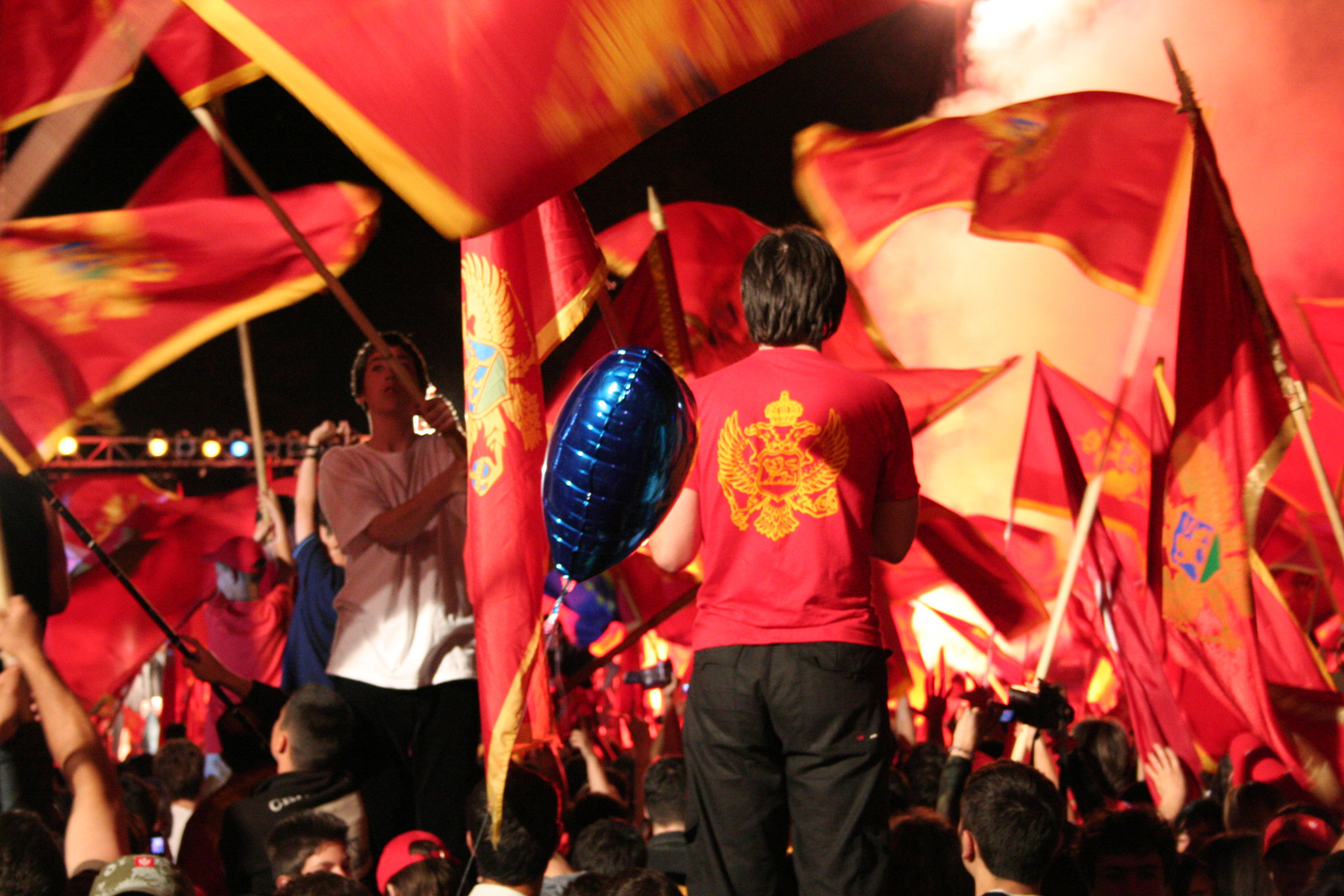
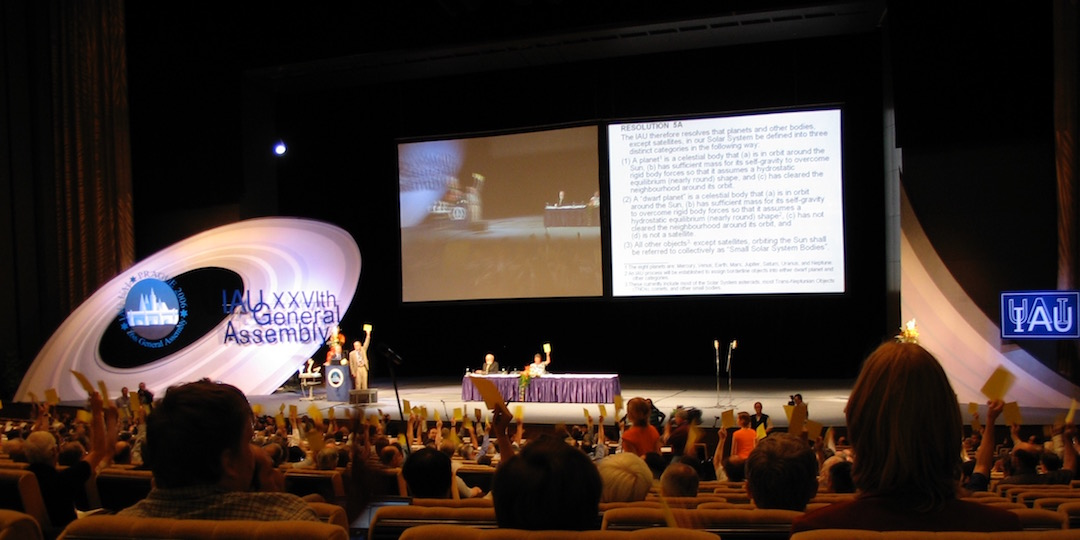
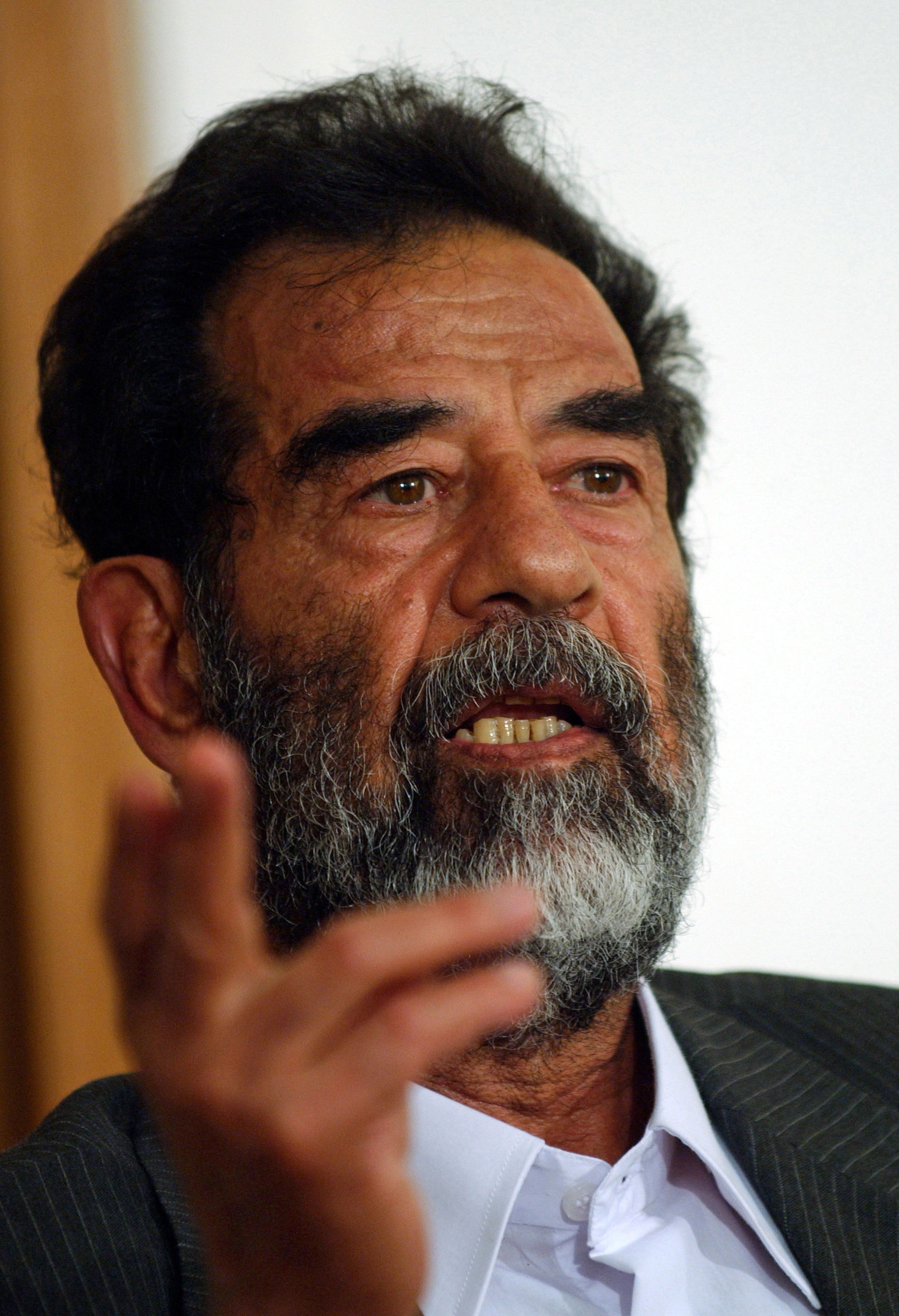
From left to right, top to bottom:
- The 2006 Lebanon War takes place;
- Social media platform Twitter was launched;
- The 2006 Winter Olympics are held in Turin, Italy;
- The 2006 FIFA World Cup was held in Germany and was won by Italy against France;
- Multiple trains blew up as a result of bombings in India, killing 209;
- Montenegro declares its independence;
- An earthquake in Yogyakarta kills 5,700;
- Pluto is declared a dwarf planet;
- Saddam Hussein is executed on December 30.

2006 (MMVI) was a common year starting on Sunday of the Gregorian calendar, the 2006th year of the Common Era (CE) and Anno Domini (AD) designations, the 6th year of the 3rd millennium and the 21st century, and the 7th year of the 2000s decade.

2006 was designated as the International Year of Deserts and Desertification.

== Population ==
The world population on January 1, 2006, was estimated to be 6.629 billion people and increased to 6.714 billion people by January 1, 2007. An estimated 138.5 million births and 53.3 million deaths took place in 2006. The average global life expectancy was 68.6 years, an increase of 0.5 years from 2005.

The estimated number of global refugees increased from 8.65 million to 9.88 million by the end of the year, marking an end to several years of declining rates. The number of refugees from Iraq increased by about 1.2 million, and the global number also increased by 464,000 after a change to how the United Nations counted refugees that resided in the United States. Afghanistan remained the largest source of refugees with 2.1 million people.

== Conflicts ==
There were 32 conflicts in 2006 that resulted in at least 25 fatalities, all of which were intrastate conflicts fought by violent non-state actors. Five resulted in at least 1,000 fatalities: the Iraqi insurgency, Eelam War IV in Sri Lanka, the Chadian Civil War, and the Sudanese War in Darfur. Peace agreements were made with at least one faction in conflicts in Angola, Burundi, Chad, Nepal, and Sudan.

The 2006 Lebanon War began when Hezbollah launched an attack against Israel on July 12 and continued until August 14, when the United Nations sent additional peacekeepers to the United Nations Interim Force in Lebanon. Israel also remained in conflict with Palestine, as Hamas rose to power in the latter nation. The Taliban insurgency in Afghanistan intensified to its highest point since the invasion of Afghanistan in 2001, and the National Liberation Front of Tripura escalated conflict in India after a brief period of relative peace the previous year. Two major rebel groups entered into conflicts in 2006: the Union of Democratic Forces for Unity in the Central African Bush War and the Islamic Courts Union in the Somali Civil War. The latter prompted the Ethiopian invasion of Somalia as Ethiopia sought to prevent the creation of an Islamic state in Somalia.

== Culture ==
The highest-grossing film globally in 2006 was Pirates of the Caribbean: Dead Man's Chest, followed by The Da Vinci Code and Ice Age 2: The Meltdown. Critically acclaimed films from 2006 include Children of Men, The Departed, The Lives of Others, Pan's Labyrinth, and United 93.

Total unit sales in music increased by 19.4 percent from the previous year. The best-selling album globally in 2006 was the High School Musical soundtrack, followed by Me and My Gang by Rascal Flatts and Some Hearts by Carrie Underwood.

Critically acclaimed video games from 2006 include The Elder Scrolls IV: Oblivion, Guitar Hero II, and Wii Sports.

== Economy ==
The gross world product increased by 3.8% in 2006. The largest growth took place in transition economies (7.2%) and developing countries (6.5%). International trade grew by over 10%, improving on the 7.3% growth in 2005. Unemployment rates lowered in developed countries, while transition economies and developing countries saw only minimal reduction in unemployment. Inflation occurred in many parts of the world but was mostly limited to oil prices, which rose to an all-time high before sharply declining.

== Environment and weather ==
The year 2006 was the fifth hottest year on record. Temperatures were cooled by La Niña in the beginning of the year, but El Niño began in September. Heat waves occurred in July in Europe and the United States, while cold waves occurred in January in India and Russia, and in June in Australia. Frost appeared in New Delhi for the first time in 70 years on January 9. The year 2006 had the highest precipitation in five years, although droughts continued in the Horn of Africa, triggering a food crisis. China also faced a severe drought in May. Major flooding occurred in southern China and the Philippine island Leyte. A magnitude 6.3 earthquake occurred on May 26 in Java, killing approximately 5,700 people.

The 2006 Atlantic hurricane season had five tropical storms, including five hurricanes. The year was closer to average following years of more active seasons. The two most intense hurricanes were Hurricane Gordon and Hurricane Helene. The 2006 Pacific typhoon season had average activity with 24 tropical storms, including 15 typhoons. The most intense typhoons were Typhoon Saomai, Typhoon Ioke, Typhoon Yagi, and Typhoon Cimaron. Six typhoons made landfall in the Philippines, breaking a 32-year record, and Typhoon Saomai was the most intense typhoon to make landfall in China in over 50 years.

== Health ==
Drug-resistant tuberculosis became a major concern in South Africa in 2006. Hundreds of cases of polio occurred in India, threatening global eradication efforts. Polio also returned to Namibia after being eradicated ten years before.

== Politics ==
Tension between Russia and the Western world grew throughout 2006, especially when Russia cut off energy to Ukraine for two days in January. The 2006 United States elections removed the Republican Party from power, leaving President George W. Bush with limited influence, and Secretary of Defense Donald Rumsfeld resigned the next day.

== Events ==
=== January ===
- January 1–4 – Russia temporarily cuts shipment of natural gas to Ukraine during a price dispute.
- January 12 – A stampede during the Stoning of the Devil ritual on the last day at the Hajj in Mina, Saudi Arabia, kills at least 362 pilgrims.
- January 15 – NASA's Stardust mission successfully ends, the first to return dust from a comet.
- January 19 – NASA launches the first interplanetary space probe to Pluto, the New Horizons.
- January 22 – Evo Morales is inaugurated as president of Bolivia.
- January 25 – Hamas wins the 2006 Palestinian legislative election.
- January 29 – The roof of one of the buildings at the Katowice International Fair collapsed in Katowice, Poland, killing 65 and injuring 170.
- January 30 – Jennifer San Marco goes on a killing spree in Goleta, California, United States, that leaves seven people dead before she takes her own life.

=== February ===
- February 4 – Egyptian passenger ferry, MS al-Salam Boccaccio 98, sinks in the Red Sea off the coast of Saudi Arabia, killing over 1,000 people.
- February 6 – Stephen Harper is sworn in as the Prime Minister of Canada after winning the federal election on January 23.
- February 10–26 – The 2006 Winter Olympics are held in Turin, Italy.
- February 17 – A massive mudslide occurs in Southern Leyte, Philippines killing an estimated 1,126 people.
- February 22 – 2006 al-Askari mosque bombing: Explosions occur at the al-Askari Shrine in Samarra, Iraq. The attack on the shrine, one of the holiest sites in Shia Islam, causes the escalation of sectarian violence in Iraq into a full-scale war (the Iraqi Civil War of 2006–2008).

=== March ===
- March 9 – NASA's Cassini–Huygens spacecraft announces a geyser-like emission of vapor, dust, and small ice crystals on Saturn's moon Enceladus, possibly indicating the presence of water.
- March 10
  - NASA's Mars Reconnaissance Orbiter enters orbit around Mars.
  - Michelle Bachelet becomes the first female president of Chile.
- March 15 – The United Nations General Assembly votes overwhelmingly to establish the United Nations Human Rights Council.
- March 21 – Microblogging and social networking service website Twitter (now known as X) was launched.

=== April ===
- April 4 – The Faddoul Brothers, kidnapped on February 23, 2006, in Caracas, Venezuela, are found dead, causing outrage and mass protests against insecurity in the country.
- April 11
  - The European Space Agency's Venus Express space probe enters Venus' orbit.
  - President Mahmoud Ahmadinejad confirms that Iran has successfully produced a few grams of low-grade enriched uranium.
- April 20 – Iran announces a deal with Russia, involving a joint uranium enrichment firm on Russian soil; nine days later Iran announces that it will not move all activity to Russia, thus leading to a de facto termination of the deal.

=== May ===
- May 17 – The Human Genome Project publishes the final chromosome sequence, in Nature.
- May 18–20 – The Eurovision Song Contest 2006 takes place in Athens, Greece, and is won by Finnish band entrant Lordi with the song "Hard Rock Hallelujah".
- May 27 – The 6.4 M_{w} Yogyakarta earthquake shakes central Java in Indonesia with an MSK intensity of IX (Destructive), leaving more than 5,700 dead and 37,000 injured.

=== June ===
- June 3 – Montenegro declares its independence from Serbia and Montenegro after a May 21 referendum and becomes a sovereign state. Two days later, the State Union of Serbia and Montenegro officially disbands after Serbia declares its independence as well, ending an 88-year union between the two countries and leaving Serbia as the successor country to the union.
- June 7 – Al Qaeda terrorist Abu Musab al-Zarqawi is killed by a US airstrike.
- June 9 to July 9 – The 2006 FIFA World Cup takes place in Germany; Italy defeats France in the final.
- June 14 - The 2006 Kismet Train Collision occurs in California. At 5:51 AM, two BNSF Railway freight trains collided head-on at the Kismet Siding in Kismet, California near Madera, California. The southbound mixed manifest train disregarded a red signal at East Kismet instead of stopping and crashed into the northbound grain train.
- June 28
  - Israel launches an offensive in the Gaza Strip in response to rocketfire by Hamas into Israeli territory.
  - The United States Armed Forces withdraws its forces in Iceland, thereby disbanding the Iceland Defense Force.

=== July ===
- July 1 – The Qinghai–Tibet railway begins operation, making Tibet the final province-level entity of China to establish a conventional railway.
- July 2 – The 2006 Mexican presidential election is held. Felipe Calderón is confirmed as the winner on September 5.
- July 6
  - The Nathu La pass between India and China, sealed during the Sino-Indian War, re-opens for trade after 44 years.
  - In Buenos Aires, Argentina, serial shooter Martín Ríos opens fire against passers-by on Cabildo Avenue, killing an 18-year-old and injuring six others.
- July 11 – A series of seven bomb blasts hits the city of Mumbai, India, killing more than 200 people.
- July 12 – 2006 Lebanon War: Israeli troops invade Lebanon in response to Hezbollah kidnapping two Israeli soldiers and killing three others. Hezbollah declares open war against Israel two days later.

=== August ===
- August 10 – News was revealed of a thwarted terrorist plot to detonate liquid explosives disguised as soft drinks, aboard multiple transatlantic air flights.
- August 14 – Sri Lankan civil war, Chencholai bombing: 61 female students in Mullaitivu are killed by the Sri Lankan Air Force in an air strike.
- August 16 – Russian government patrol boat shoots at a Japanese fishing boat, killing one crew member.
- August 22 – Pulkovo Aviation Enterprise Flight 612 crashes near the Russian border in Ukraine, killing all 170 people on board.
- August 24 – The International Astronomical Union defines 'planet' at its 26th General Assembly, removing Pluto's status as a planet and reclassifying it as a dwarf planet 76 years after its discovery. Ironically, this was in the same year when NASA sent its first probe to the celestial body.
- August 27 – Comair Flight 5191 crashes on takeoff from Blue Grass Airport, Lexington, Kentucky, killing all 47 passengers and two of three crew members.

=== September ===
- September 1 — Analog terrestrial television is switched off in Luxembourg, being the first country to do so.
- September 4 — Australian conservationist Steve Irwin is fatally stung in the heart by a stingray while filming an underwater documentary.
- September 7
  - British Prime Minister Tony Blair announces his intention to resign by the end of 2007.
  - Partial lunar eclipse, visible over most of Africa, Europe, Asia and Australia.
- September 19 – The Royal Thai Army overthrows the government of Prime Minister Thaksin Shinawatra in a coup.
- September 22 – Annular solar eclipse, visible in Guyana, Suriname, French Guiana, parts of Brazil, and the southern Atlantic.
- September 28 – Typhoon Xangsane passed Manila on its way to causing more than 300 deaths, mostly in the Philippines and Vietnam.
- September 29 – Gol Transportes Aéreos Flight 1907, a Boeing 737-800, collides with an Embraer Legacy 600 over the Amazon rainforest, killing all 154 occupants on board the 737 whereas all 7 on board the Legacy survive.

=== October ===
- October 5 – Code Geass: Lelouch of the Rebellion premiered in Japan.
- October 6 – Fredrik Reinfeldt replaces Göran Persson as Prime Minister of Sweden.
- October 9
  - North Korea claims to have conducted its first-ever nuclear test.
  - Google purchased YouTube for US$1.65 billion.
- October 11–13 – St Andrews Agreement is held in Scotland between the British and Irish governments on devolution in Northern Ireland.
- October 13 – South Korean Ban Ki-moon is elected as the new Secretary-General of the United Nations, succeeding Kofi Annan.
- October 22 – Fernando Alonso wins his second World Drivers Championship.
- October (date unknown) – The Offshore MPA project is initiated.
- October 24 – Taylor Swift releases her debut album,Taylor Swift.

=== November ===
- November 1 - Poisoning of Alexander Litvinenko: Litvinenko, former officer of the Russian Federal Security Service and critic of the Putin administration, is poisoned with Polonium-210. He dies of acute radiation syndrome on 23 November, causing widespread accusations that the Russian government was behind the poisoning.
- November 2 – No. 5, 1948 by Jackson Pollock becomes the most expensive painting after it is sold privately for $140 million.
- November 3 – Microsoft releases Office 2007 for manufacturing.
- November 5 – Former President of Iraq Saddam Hussein is sentenced to death by hanging by the Iraqi Special Tribunal. He is later executed by hanging for crimes against humanity on December 30.
- November 8 – Microsoft releases Windows Vista for manufacturing.
- November 11 – Sony releases the PlayStation 3.
- November 12 – The breakaway state of South Ossetia holds a referendum on independence from Georgia.
- November 19 – Nintendo releases the Wii.
- November 22 – A toxic waste dumping incident occurs in Côte d'Ivoire by a Panama ship sent by Singaporean oil company, causing 3 deaths and the poison treatment of 1500 people.
- November 23 – A series of car bombs and mortar attacks in Sadr City, Baghdad, kills at least 215 people and injure 257 other people.

=== December ===
- December 1 – WikiLeaks leaks Hassan Dahir Aweys' conspiracy to assassinate Somali government officials.
- December 5 – The military seizes power in Fiji, in a coup d'état led by Commodore Frank Bainimarama.
- December 11
  - Mexican drug war: Felipe Calderón sends the Mexican military to combat the drug cartels and put down the violence in the state of Michoacán, initiating Mexico's drug war.
  - Analog terrestrial television is switched off permanently in the Netherlands.
- December 21 – The Juraj Dobrila University of Pula is established.
- December 24 – War in Somalia (2006–09): Ethiopia admits its troops have intervened in Somalia.
- December 29 – UK settles its Anglo-American loan, post-WWII loan debt.
- December 30 – Former Iraqi president Saddam Hussein, was executed by hanging.

== Nobel Prizes ==

- Chemistry – Roger D. Kornberg.
- Economics – Edmund Phelps.
- Literature – Orhan Pamuk.
- Peace – Muhammad Yunus and the Grameen Bank.
- Physics – John C. Mather, and George F. Smoot.
- Physiology or Medicine – Andrew Z. Fire, and Craig C. Mello.

== Bibliography ==
- Franklin, James L.; Brown, Daniel P. (March 1, 2008). "Atlantic Hurricane Season of 2006". Monthly Weather Review. 136 (3): 1174–1200. Bibcode:2008MWRv..136.1174F. doi:10.1175/2007MWR2377.1. ISSN 1520-0493.
- Harbom, Lotta; Wallensteen, Peter (2007). "Armed Conflict, 1989-2006". Journal of Peace Research. 44 (5): 623–634. doi:10.1177/0022343307080859. ISSN 0022-3433. JSTOR 27640570.
- Lindberg, Sara; Melvin, Neil J. (2007). "Major armed conflicts". SIPRI Yearbook 2007: Armaments, Disarmament and International Security. Stockholm International Peace Research Institute. pp. 55–78. ISBN 978-0-19-923021-1.
- Annual 2006 Global Climate Report (Report). National Oceanic and Atmospheric Administration. 2007. Archived from the original on May 14, 2025.
- Saunders, Mark; Lea, Adam (January 10, 2007). Summary of 2006 NW Pacific Typhoon Season and Verification of Authors' Seasonal Forecasts (PDF). Tropical Storm Risk (Report). University College London. Archived (PDF) from the original on July 5, 2014.
- World Population Prospects 2024 (Report). United Nations Department of Economic and Social Affairs. 2024. Archived from the original on July 11, 2022.
- World Economic Situation and Prospects 2007 (PDF) (Report). United Nations Department of Economic and Social Affairs. 2007. ISBN 9789211554021.
- 2006 Global Refugee Trends (Report). United Nations High Commissioner for Refugees. 2007.
