= MTK =

MTK may refer to:

== Sport ==
- MTK Budapest, a Hungarian multi-sports club
- MTK Global (Mack the Knife Global), a professional boxing and MMA promoter

== Business ==
- MediaTek, a Taiwanese microchip manufacturer
- Katowice International Fair (Międzynarodowe Targi Katowickie), Poland
- MTK Group, runs some public buses in Sofia

== Entertainment ==
- MTK (musical group), a Brazilian pop and rap group
- Matt the Knife (born 1988), an American stage magician and mentalist
- Mike the Knight a 2011 Canadian/British children's television series.

== Other ==
- Vehicle registration of Main-Taunus-Kreis, Germany
- Makin Airport, Kiribati (IATA code "MTK")

== See also ==
- MTK-2, Russian version of Baudot telegraphy code
