= Zolitūde shopping centre roof collapse =

2013 disaster in Riga, Latvia

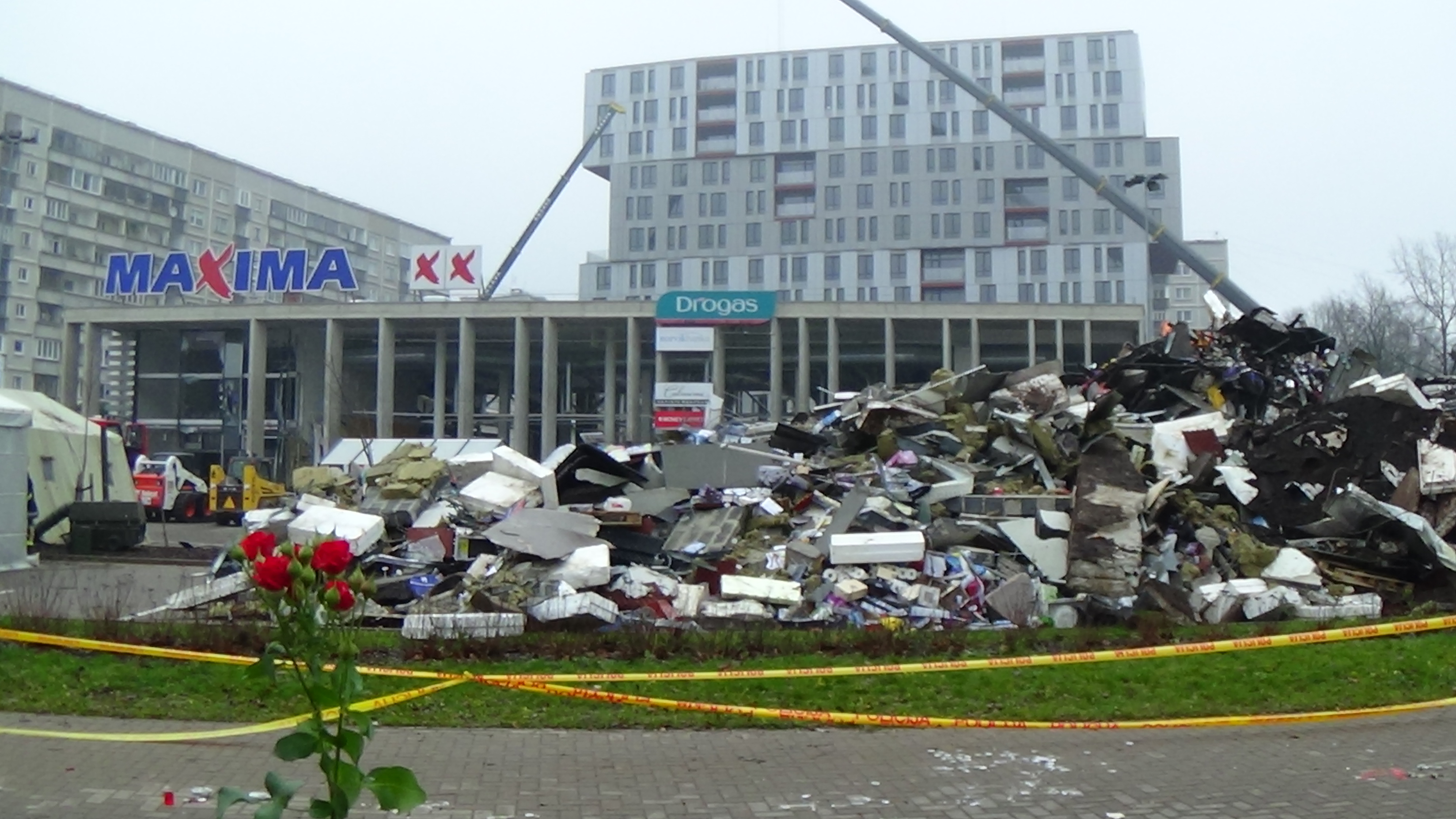
- Area of the site on 23 November 2013
- Date: 21 November 2013
- Time: 17:44 UTC+2
- Location: Priedaines iela 20, Zolitūde, Riga, Latvia; 56°56′38″N 24°1′3″E
- Cause: Structural design flaw
- Deaths: 54
- Injuries: 41

On 21 November 2013 the roof of a Maxima shopping centre in the Zolitūde neighbourhood of Riga, Latvia, collapsed at 17:44 local time, resulting in the deaths of 54 people, including three rescue workers, and injuries to another 41 people. An unknown number of people were able to leave the store on their own after the initial collapse. It was the worst disaster in Latvia since 1950, when the steamer Mayakovsky sank in Riga, killing 147 people. The disaster is often called Zolitūdes traģēdija ("Tragedy of Zolitūde" or "Zolitūde tragedy") by Latvian media outlets.

== Building overview ==
The building, which contained a Maxima supermarket and other businesses, was completed on 3 November 2011. Architectural design was by Zane Kalinka and Andris Kalinka from the local architectural firm Kubs. It was developed by Homburg Valda and built by the Re&Re company. When the building was finished, it won the Latvian Building of the Year award. Several months before its opening, a fire broke out in the supermarket in which nobody was injured. At the time of the collapse, construction by Re&Re was taking place. The area of the shopping centre was 4,750 m^{2} (51,100 sq ft), and the building cost around €1.4 million. The shopping centre was located in a part of the building owned by SIA Tineo, but it was originally owned by The Homburg Group, which still owns the adjacent apartment building. Tineo is an offshore company owned by the Maxima group, a retail chain with operations mostly in the Baltic states, which owned the "Maxima XX" supermarket in the building. The company initially claimed it was a tenant of the building. The building also contained a bank, a beauty salon, a currency exchange, a newsagent's and a pet shop. There were plans for a layer of topsoil 20–30 centimetres (7.9–11.8 in) thick on the roof; small recreational spots with benches, connected by cobblestone-paved paths, were planned for the resident of an apartment house that was part of the same complex. Before the collapse, construction of the green roof was in progress, as was construction of underground car parking in the basement, intended for residents of the building.

== Collapse ==
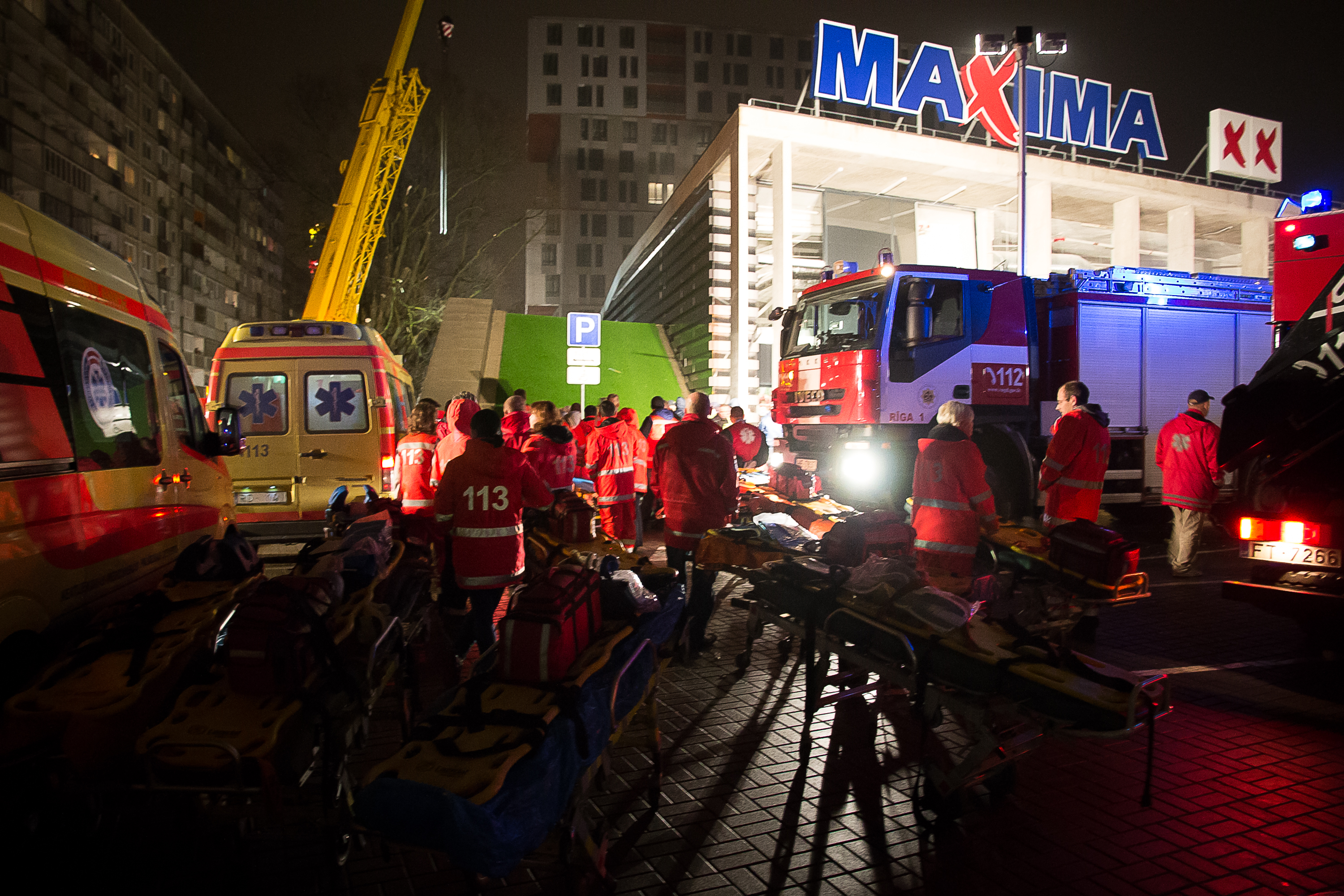
Rescuers gathered near the entrance of the store

Eyewitnesses said that at around 16:21 a fire alarm was set off and there were announcements made that the store should be evacuated. It was later reported that the owner of the company which had installed the alarm said that it was unlikely that it was set off by dust from the roof starting to collapse, as it was set off near water pipes in the basement. The store's security verified that there was no fire and therefore did not carry out an evacuation, but rather treated it as a false alarm and called a technician to turn it off. The building collapsed shortly after the technician arrived and he was not able to verify why the alarm had gone off. A board member of "Maxima Latvija" said that security had followed protocol, which was not to evacuate if there was no visible danger. According to some reports, the smaller shops in the retail centre, unlike Maxima, were evacuated and closed. Many customers, however, stayed in the supermarket, encouraged by the Maxima's employees. Some employees of the smaller shops also started returning to their workplaces after being told by security that it was a false alarm. Security personnel verified the alarm to be related to welding construction in the basement.

The roof caved in at 17:41 local time. Because the collapse occurred during peak shopping hours, it was suspected that at least a hundred people may have been in the supermarket during the incident. Eyewitnesses said the roof collapsed over the checkout counters, where many people were waiting to pay, and over the dairy, alcoholic beverage and household chemicals sections. This was confirmed by police who released a map based on CCTV footage just before the collapse. It was later reported that the collapse started over checkout counters 6, 7 and 8. There were more than 50 employees and an uncertain number of customers in the smaller shops in the retail centre, most of whom were able to escape before rescuers arrived. Most of the supermarket lost electrical power due to damage caused by the collapse, which resulted in the main door locking and trapping several people inside; they had to break the glass to escape.

The firefighters, paramedics and police arrived at the scene within minutes. After the initial collapse, firefighters divided the building into four working areas. Although it had initially seemed that the remaining roof construction posed no further danger, at 19:04 another part of the roof collapsed over one of the previously designated work areas, trapping several firefighters, injuring twelve and killing three of them. By that time 20 people – most of those injured in the first collapse – had been rescued. The injured were transferred to the Pauls Stradins Clinical University Hospital, the Riga East Clinical University Hospital, the Riga Second Hospital, and the Traumatology and Orthopedic Hospital. One child was transferred to the Clinical University Hospital for Children.

Both before and after the second collapse, only firefighters were allowed to enter the building, and anyone inside was pulled out and brought to the ambulances parked just outside the store. After the second collapse, it was reported that only five firefighters were allowed to enter the building at a time, and that the rest were forced to wait outside because of the danger of further collapse. Each firefighter was allowed to spend only half an hour working. Bulldozers were used to clear the rubble. Mobile cranes were deployed at 21:27 to lift concrete slabs.

According to a Latvian Army tweet, 110 soldiers were on the site on 21 November. Several tents were installed for the use of firefighters and ambulance workers by the military. Several countries offered Latvia assistance in the operation, however it was turned down as state and fire rescue service believed they already had the required manpower, equipment and experience for the rescue operation.

At least one silent period was used to listen for signs of life among the rubble; some cell phones were heard ringing. Thermal scanners and search and rescue dogs was also used, however this proved unsuccessful as the concrete rubble was too thick to detect warmth and dogs were distracted by the strong scent of household chemicals and alcohol that had leaked from broken packing.

Another fireman was reported to have been injured during clearing of the rubble in the early hours of 23 November.

Another collapse occurred at 17:52 on 23 November. None of the rescuers were harmed in this subsequent collapse. As the third collapse compromised the structural integrity of the roof, rescue efforts were stopped at around 19:00. A representative of the paramedics said that, given the severity of injuries the bodies of the latest victims had, they had no hope anyone else might still be alive.

The rescue was restarted the following afternoon. No more victims were found in the rubble and rescue work was finished on 25 November.

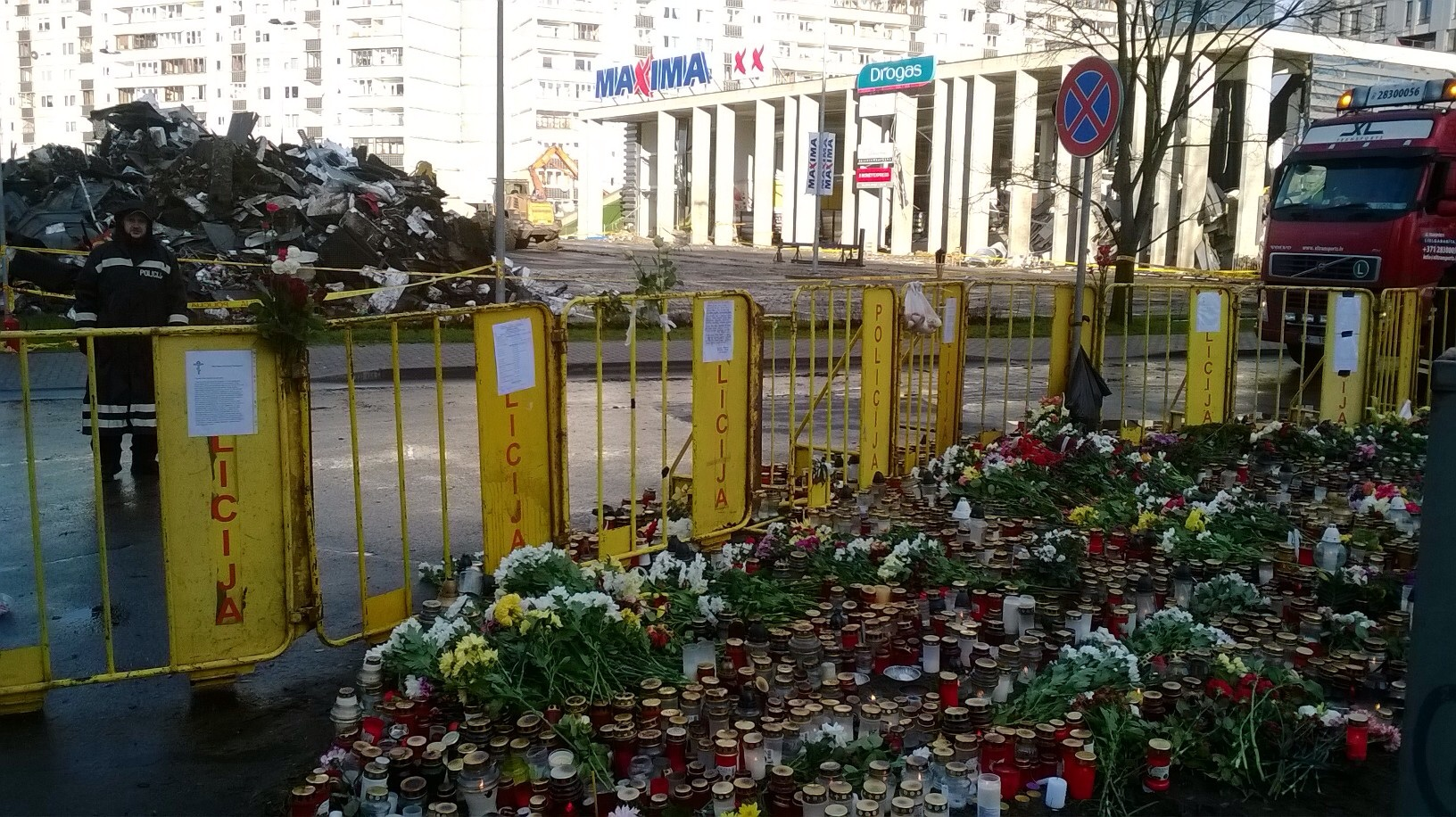
Candles and flowers in memory of the victims. The rubble can be seen in the background.

== Aftermath ==
After the disaster, the Mayor of Riga Nils Ušakovs gave an order to inspect all building projects carried out by Re&Re.

The developer of the apartment building put additional construction on hold. The apartment building itself was not damaged in the incident.

Maxima agreed to pay compensation to the victims and families of the dead.

The fatalities have been identified as 53 citizens of Latvia, and 1 citizen of Armenia.

== Investigation and cause ==
The inquiry into the collapse began just minutes after it occurred. The police investigated three theories: first, that there was an error in structural design, and authorities overseeing planning had been negligent; second, that the cause is related to initial building procedures; third, that it was caused by the construction of the green roof.

In a related case on 27 February 2014 a man was fined for signature forgery on documents related to construction works in 2011. The police announced this finding in March, but did not disclose any further information. Latvian Television ran a report in April alleging that the person fined was owner of a now liquidated company MONCE – a subcontractor hired to install the metal constructions of the building by the manufacturer of the constructions Vikom Industry. Instead of hiring a certified building engineer to oversee the installation, the company had forged the documents using the name of an engineer, whom they previously had offered a job and paid him a token salary of 5.95 lats a month from January to April 2011, which he actually never received.

The investigation of the cause of collapse was hindered by the collapsed building still being unsafe to enter. The remaining constructions were reinforced by March 2014. From April 2014, investigators were finally able to enter the building, where they recovered evidence buried by the third collapse of the roof and carried out investigation experiments – a controlled collapse of the remaining section of the roof and controlled fires, to test what loads the roof could carry and if the building's structures could have been compromised in the fire which occurred during its construction. The preliminary findings from the controlled collapse, which took place from 14 to 17 April showed prolonged deformation of the metal support structures, which started well before the target weight of the roof was reached and ended with the constructions eventually breaking, suggesting that the roof was built improperly and the actual collapse was not caused by a sudden change, but by overloading structures for a prolonged period of time and possibly metal fatigue. Two controlled fires were set on 27 May. The police did not disclose preliminary results of this experiment and said that they aim to complete investigation in late fall. On 10 June 2014 it was announced that a separate criminal inquiry has been launched to verify findings of State Labour Inspectorate, which reported work safety violations in Maxima. The police concluded investigation on the site on 28 July 2014.

In January 2015 the first suspects were named – construction engineer Ivars Sergets, design expert Andris Gulbis and architect Andris Kalinka. In addition the assets of HND Grupa (a company owned by Sergets) and Kubs (owned by Kalinka and his sister) were frozen. It is unclear what the architect is suspected for as both the investigators and his representatives refused to comment. Sergets is suspected of making an error in the designs of the building's roof constructions. Gulbis is suspected of negligence as he was supposed to inspect and approve the design, but failed to notice the error. Prosecutor general Ēriks Kalnmeiers cautioned that the investigation is still ongoing and there will be more suspects. He said that the way the building was designed meant it was bound to collapse, however, the investigation had uncovered other factors that contributed to the collapse occurring at a particular time and therefore resulting in deaths, as well as numerous unrelated violations, which speak of a general tendency to disregard regulations, therefore everyone who had been neglectful contributed to the accident and should be held responsible.

The trial began on 8 December 2015 for the 9 accused persons: construction engineer Ivars Sergets, architect Andris Kalinka, construction expert Andris Gulbis, construction inspector Mārtiņš Draudiņš, head of construction at the Re&Re Staņislavs Kumpiņš, representatives of the Riga construction board Jānis Balodis, Marika Treija and Aija Meļņikova and employee of the Maxima supermarket Inna Šuvajeva. The trial was held in Ķīpsala International Exposition Centre outside court buildings due to the several hundred people involved, with 263 named as victims and 144 as witnesses.

Verdicts were delivered on 18 February 2020. Eight of the nine defendants were acquitted. The building's civil engineer Ivars Sergets was sentenced to six years in prison for making gross errors in the structural calculations, which directly led to the collapse.

=== Initial speculations on the cause ===
According to Re&Re's preliminary report, the cause was likely a design error. The report is a result of three independent civil engineers' examination of the project documentation. The rooftop garden was included in the original design, but the building was still "designed with insufficient load carrying capacity, three times less than required". The report states that the main reasons for the collapse are faulty estimation of the maximum load to be carried by the roof, and the design of the connections in the structural steel supporting the roof.

According to Ivars Sergets, the owner of HND Grupa which was responsible for the construction of the building, the collapse may have been caused by overload, created by materials being loaded onto weaker points of the roof. He rejected the possibility that the disaster had been caused by the design of the garden, since the store had been operating for two winters and the stress created by the weight of snow had been up to twice as great as the stress caused by the garden at the time of the collapse. He pointed out that too many of the building materials were stored on the roof. Later on, however, he admitted that trusses made of two pieces bolted together were used, while the original design called for a single truss. This was a result of issues with transporting longer trusses to the building site.

Lilita Ozola, an engineer teaching at the Latvian University of Agriculture, suggested that for changing the trusses the entire design plan should have been revised and reapproved by authorities. With the two-piece trusses installed, the joint between them would bear most of the roof's weight. She pointed out that there is a video recording of the shopping centre's roof collapsing in which it is obvious that it failed at the exact position of the joints. She also criticised construction work taking place on the roof when there were people in the building.

Toomas Kaljas, who claims to be a structural engineer working for a Finnish company, has published research based on photographs from the site, suggesting the connections between the horizontal bars that held the roof were inadequately designed. The load on the bolts that were holding the bars was uneven and there were too few of them. The calculations of forces applied to bolts were wrong. A better design would have resulted in components bending and cracking over time, instead of the whole building suddenly collapsing like dominoes without warning. Kaljas tested some nuts which were built to meet DIN 934 standard and which, according to him, are available in any hardware store. He found that these are not strong enough. A solution would have been to either get stronger nuts, or place two of them on the end of the same bolt. According to Kaljas, the building designer should have issued a standard for the required nuts or, if not, then the builders should have asked for it. He thinks all public buildings that use these bolts should get additional nuts. Latvian state police has called into question the competence of Kaljas stating that he was not able to produce his credentials. It is also speculated that he has connections to Vikom Industry, although he himself has denied it.

According to a press representative of Kubs, the architect bureau that designed the building, the possibly faulty metal joint components were supplied by Vikom Industry. The management at Vikom Industry had said that they were unable to provide single-piece components and offered components that would be assembled out of two-halves, but which would be just as strong as the ones ordered. Therefore, according to Kubs, Vikom Industry is solely responsible for the component and bolt force and strength calculations. Vladislavs Podgurskis, a representative of Vikom Industry, said in response that all metal components were made and assembled strictly according to the building design and that it must be a design error.

Vikom Industry said the bolts for joining the trusses had been supplied by the Eurobolts company. On 25 November Vikom Industry requested a manufacturer's certificate from Eurobolts for a certain batch of bolts. The owner and CEO of Eurobolts, Olga Romanova, said that the company has no information on what the bolts they sell are used for, however, the bolts in the batch Vikom Industry was interested in were not strong enough for joining trusses for the roof and that Vikom Industry had in fact never bought bolts that would be strong enough for that purpose. She added that judging from photographs of the trusses on the scene of the incident even smaller bolts were used. An anonymous fireman told TV3 News that the bolts he had seen on scene had not been broken, rather pulled out from fastenings, indicating the bolts were not designed for bearing the weight of the roof.

The vice director of the Latvian Fire Safety and Civil Defence College, Vilis Students, who participated in the rescue work, said that the concrete components seemed unexpectedly fragile. Translated quote: "I am no specialist, but we could break the roof components with hammers and pliers. During exercises with concrete objects, we usually had to use a jackhammer."

According to Maxima staff, the building had been dangerously unstable for about a year. The construction workers had told them that the foundation was cracked and needed reinforcement. At one point the storage room and store workers' locker room were completely flooded. There had also been extra support columns under the ceiling of the storage room, but those had been removed later. The fire alarm sounded frequently. The staff believe that the reason for the alarm was that it was obsolete and could not distinguish smoke from dust. The store employees did not want to testify about this in front of a camera due to a fear of losing their jobs.

== Political reaction ==
On 23 November, Latvian President Andris Bērziņš stated that the collapse was a "murder of defenseless people" and that the "perpetrators should be arrested", and that the inquiry needed independent experts from other countries who are not associated with Latvian builders in any possible way. He also said that the entire political system needs to be changed as it allows individuals to escape responsibility. The BBC News Riga correspondent reported that the president wanted a criminal investigation "led by independent investigators from abroad – implying that powerful business interests in Latvia are too closely entwined with politics to ensure a fair and honest investigation."

Latvian Prime Minister Valdis Dombrovskis resigned on 27 November. He said that the country needed strong government with support in parliament at the moment of crisis and that he was thus taking responsibility for the incident. He also said he had considered this in the days after the tragedy and had made a final decision during a meeting with the president, but denied the president had asked him to step down. Opinion polls indicate that most people want mayor of Riga Nils Ušakovs to also step down. As political commentator Aivars Ozoliņš points out, since the Riga city council controls the local building authority responsible for the quality of buildings in Riga it was Ušakovs, not Dombrovskis, who should have taken political responsibility for the incident. Soon after the collapse several experts cited abolishing state building inspection among the reasons why control over building processes has lessened. This was done as a result of budget cuts during the global economic crisis as it was thought that municipal building authorities perform the same tasks. This was done in 2009 by the government of Valdis Dombrovskis. Ušakovs has cited this as the reason why the government of Dombrovskis was responsible; however he himself was a member of the Saeima when this decision was made and supported it in parliament.

The incident also caused some tension between Latvia and Lithuania after the top management of the Lithuanian-owned chain refused to take any responsibility for the incident. In particular, the CEO of Maxima Latvija, Gintaras Jasinskas, when asked if he had considered stepping down like Dombrovskis, caused outrage by saying "Why? Those who feel guilty should step down. I can look people in the eye". This was condemned by several Latvian politicians and the Latvian Ministry of Foreign Affairs called the Lithuanian ambassador to express official condemnation. Jasinskas was sacked and Lithuania expressed regret over his actions.

== Parliamentary investigation ==
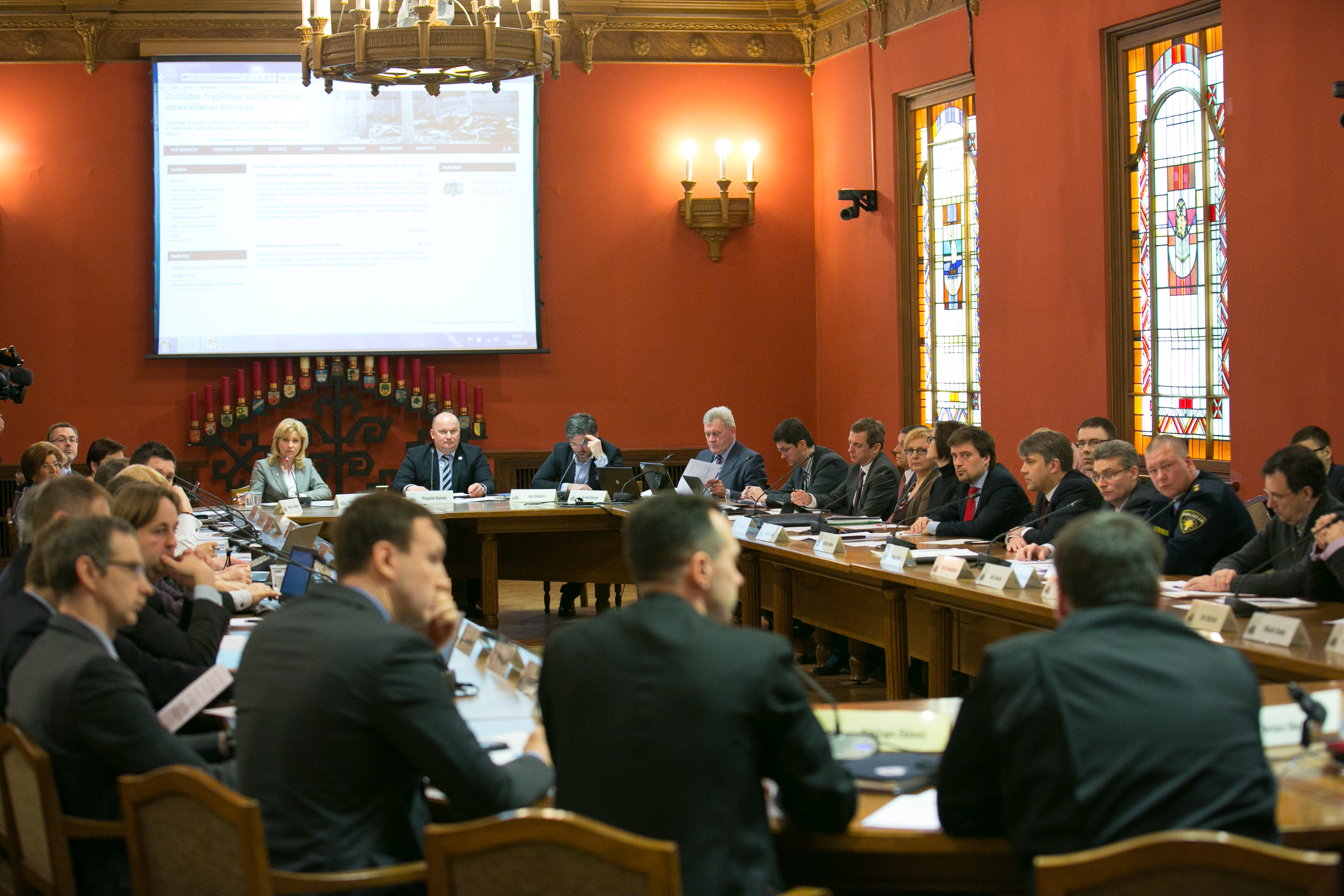
Saeima's Zolitūde tragedy investigatory committee meeting on 23 March 2015

On 11 November 2014 members of the 12th convocation of Saeima, at the request of 36 deputies, voted in favour of establishing the Zolitūde tragedy parliamentary investigatory committee. (Note: The full name of the Committee is "Parliamentary Committee for Investigating the Actions Taken by the State of Latvia in Assessing the Causes of the Tragedy in Zolitūde on 21 November 2013, Improving the Legislative Framework and Practical Measures to be Taken by the Public Administration and Municipalities in Order to Prevent Recurrence of Similar Tragedies, as well as Mitigating the Consequences of the Tragedy".) The committee was appointed for the period of 12 months to investigate the actions taken by the state of Latvia in assessing the causes of the tragedy as well as measures taken by the government to prevent the recurrence of similar tragedies and mitigate the consequences of the tragedy.

The committee devoted most of its attention to issues in the construction sector of the economy, including state and municipal supervision of the construction sector (especially the dissolution of the State Construction Inspection Office and the creation of the National Construction Control Agency), quality of construction engineering education and the certification system, public procurement in construction sector, supervision of the market of construction materials and other questions. Addressing issues related to civil defence and social assistance, the committee in its sittings examined the following topics: competence of the employees of the security company; cooperation between rescue services and municipalities in emergency situations, coordination of emergency response and mitigation of accident impact, resources of the responsible services; involvement of non-government organisations in emergency situations, in organizing social support; emergency social care package offered by the state and municipalities, and other topics.

The final report of the committee was adopted on the committee meeting on 27 October 2015 and has been published in the official journal "Latvijas Vēstnesis" in Latvian and English. In the final report the committee named seven persons as morally and politically responsible for the tragedy:

- former Prime Minister, Valdis Dombrovskis;
- former Ministers for Economics, Artis Kampars and Daniels Pavļuts;
- former state secretaries of the Ministry of Economics, Anrijs Matīss and Juris Pūce;
- Mayor of Riga, Nils Ušakovs;
- Head of the Riga Construction Board, Inguss Vircavs.

== Protests ==
A protest movement against the parties involved sprung up after the incident. Maxima stores were boycotted due in part to statements by its management after the shopping centre's roof collapsed, and also due to reports of exploitation of workers and poor product quality. Several employees, including those that worked in the collapsed store, told media that they received insufficient safety instructions, fire escape doors were blocked, they were not allowed to leave work without permission even to visit the toilet and would have their pay reduced if they failed to comply. The stores would also keep only a few checkout counters open in order to save money, causing long lines to form, requiring employees to work long hours, while paying the minimum wage. Maxima was also criticised for apparently intimidating workers to keep them from reporting discrepancies to authorities, talking to media or joining a trade union. The company was also accused of lying in the wake of the tragedy for initially denying owning the building and for saying that their safety instructions, which required evacuation only when it had been verified there was obvious danger, had been approved by the State Fire and Rescue Service. There also have been protests against Maxima in Lithuania.

== Reactions ==
The Latvian president stated that the Saturday, Sunday and Monday immediately following the disaster would be days of mourning and sent condolences to Armenia in response to the death of one of its citizens.

The families of victims requested that all objects at the site of the disaster be dismantled and evacuated, including the 12-story apartment building owned by Homburg Zolitūde. The Mayor of Riga Nils Ušakovs said that the Maxima building would be demolished and have a temporary memorial built in its place. Since then, relatives of victims have asked for a proper memorial.

Riga Council and Estonian real estate company Prana Property could not come to an agreement whereas the council would purchase the land and the unfinished apartment building for 200,000 Euro, demolish it and build a memorial. Prana Property countered that they had purchased the land for 4 million and could finish the construction of the apartment building. In the end, the parties agreed to end co-ownership of the land and the company would keep the apartment building property and provide access to the future memorial, while the council would demolish the underground parking section and construct a memorial.

In almost all Latvian embassies, people were allowed to write their names in condolence books. The Latvian Lutheran and Russian Orthodox church organisations urged people to pray for the victims of the tragedy.

Representatives of Maxima Latvia expressed condolences to the families of the deceased. After an emergency meeting, the board of Maxima promised that inspections would be carried out on all Maxima stores.

Lithuania and Estonia declared a day of mourning on 24 November.

== See also ==
- List of structural failures and collapses
- 2013 Savar building collapse
- Bad Reichenhall Ice Rink roof collapse
- Extreme Loading for Structures
- Katowice Trade Hall roof collapse
- Sampoong Department Store collapse
- Algo Centre Mall
- Structural integrity and failure
- Structural robustness
