= Escarião =

Brazilian singer (born 1992)

- Born: Luiz Fernando Escarião Barreto; 27 September 1992 (age 34); São Paulo, Brazil
- Occupations: Singer; songwriter
- Years active: 2014–present
- Musical career
- Genres: Funk carioca; pop
- Instrument: Digital audio workstation
- Labels: Sony Music; ONErpm

Luiz Fernando Escarião Barreto, known only as Escarião (born 27 September 1992), is a Brazilian singer, internet celebrity and YouTuber.

== Biography and career ==
1 Fernando Escarião was born in Brasília, Distrito Federal. He finished high school in Brasilia, began to study Administration, but ended up locking up and going to live in São Paulo to study theater. In 2013, he started on the internet and quickly became a top Brazilian influencers of Vine, so with Maju Tridandade, in 2014 he created a channel on YouTube and began investing in the career as YouTuber, between 2016 and 2017, he started his music career as a singer and composer of pop funk. In 2018 was nominated and won the first edition of the MTV Millennial Awards Brazil in the category "Passinho Viral" for the performance of "Joga Bunda" by Aretuza Lovi in partnership with Pabllo Vittar and Gloria Groove.

The first single from Escarião is called "Empina Mais", one of the electronic hits of ballads in Brazil. As YouTuber Fernando has collaborated with big names in the internet and Brazilian TV, among them Matheus Mazzafera, Regina Volpato, Klébio Damas, Rafael Ucmann and Maju Trindade. In February 2019, Escarião released the single Our Story, one of the hits of the Carnival of 2019. On 8 March 2019, Escarião released their first studio album, "Escarião," which debuted at # 3 on the iTunes best selling album chart in Brazil. Escarião is the creator of the LGBT ballad Vem Pro Bonde, which takes place in São Paulo.

== Discography ==
- Escarião – Álbum

=== Singles ===
- "Empina Mais" Single
- "Check-In" Single
- "Nossa História" Single
- "Sol Raiar" Single
- "Sol Raiar Parte 2 feat Leo Hainer" Single

== Awards and nominations ==
Year	Nominee / work	Award	Result
BreakTudo Awards 2019	Empinha Mais	Music Video Debut	Nominated
MTV MIAW Brazil 2018	Joga Bunda	Passinho Viral	Won
