= Ethan (singer) =

New Zealand singer and songwriter

- Born: Ethan Choryin Luo; May 13, 1997 (age 28); Auckland, New Zealand
- Origin: Sydney, Australia
- Genres: Pop, R&B
- Occupations: Singer, songwriter, record producer
- Instrument: Vocals
- Years active: 2018–present

Ethan Choryin Luo (born 13 May 1997), known professionally as Ethan, is a New Zealand-born singer, songwriter, and record producer based in Sydney, Australia. In 2023, he participated in the APRA AMCOS SongHubs: Pride songwriting program, curated by Troye Sivan. He released his EP Divine Intervention in 2024, which was listed by Out magazine among the year's releases by LGBTQ artists. He collaborated with Keiynan Lonsdale on the single "90s Babe" and has performed at events including Sydney Gay and Lesbian Mardi Gras and Sydney WorldPride. In 2026, he is confirmed on the lineup of the London pop festival Mighty Hoopla.

== Biography ==
Ethan was born in Auckland, New Zealand, and later moved to Australia, where he established his music career in Sydney.

== Career ==
=== 2018–2022: Early releases ===
Ethan began his musical journey independently with the release of his debut single "Enemies" in 2018. In the following years, he continued releasing music that attracted attention from specialized press and the Australian LGBTQ scene.

=== 2023–present: Divine Intervention and collaborations ===
In 2023, Ethan took part in the APRA AMCOS SongHubs: Pride songwriting program, led by singer Troye Sivan, where he developed material for his first EP. The same year, he released the single "90s Babe" in partnership with singer and actor Keiynan Lonsdale, which was reviewed by publications such as The Indiependent. The track was also included in Grindr's New Music Frigay playlist.

In 2024, he released the EP Divine Intervention, which later received a deluxe edition. The work was included by Out magazine in the list of "85 albums by LGBTQ+ artists released in 2024". From the EP, the singles "Single in the Club" and "Like It" were released. "Single in the Club" was produced in a collaborative session in London with fellow artist ISADORA and mixed in Los Angeles with Zach Bahn.

In November 2024, Ethan participated in the BreakTudo Awards with a performance of the single "Like It" from Bangkok. The track was also nominated in the "Song By New International Artist" category, competing with artists such as BGYO and 4EVE.

In January 2025, he released "One More Song", which was covered by Queerty magazine. Later in 2025, he released "Damage Control".

In 2026, Ethan released the single "Weaker Days".

=== Live performances ===
Ethan has regularly performed at Australian LGBTQ+ community events. In 2023, he took part in Sydney WorldPride. The following year, he was on the main stage of Fair Day, part of the Sydney Gay and Lesbian Mardi Gras 2024. In 2025, he returned to Fair Day for another performance.

In 2026, he is confirmed on the lineup of the London pop festival Mighty Hoopla, alongside artists such as Lily Allen and Jessie J. Internationally, he has also performed at Bangkok nightclubs, including Stranger Bar and Fake Club.

== Musical style ==
Ethan's music is described as a fusion of pop and R&B, incorporating elements of house and dancehall. Kaltblut magazine described him as a "sonic alchemist" from Sydney. His work often explores LGBTQ themes and queer experiences.

== Discography ==
=== Extended plays ===
- Divine Intervention (2023)
- Divine Intervention (God Tier Edition) [Deluxe] (2024)

=== Singles ===
Title	Year	Album
"Enemies"	2018	Non-album singles
"90s Babe" (with Keiynan Lonsdale)	2023	Non-album singles
"Single in the Club"	2024	Divine Intervention
"Like It"	2024	Divine Intervention
"One More Song"	2025	Non-album singles
"Damage Control"	2025	Non-album singles
"Weaker Days"	2026	Non-album singles

== Awards and nominations ==
Name of the award ceremony, year presented, award category, nominee(s) of the award, and the result of the nomination
Award ceremony	Year	Category	Nominee(s)/work	Result	Ref.
BreakTudo Awards	2024	Song by New International Artist	"Like It"	Nominated	
BreakTudo Awards	2025	Anthem of the Year	"One More Song"	Nominated	
