= Mateus Asato =

Brazilian guitarist (born 1994)

- Born: Mateus Asato; 29 December 1994 (age 31); Campo Grande, Brazil
- Genres: Blues rock; jazz rock; hard rock; neo soul; instrumental rock
- Occupations: Guitarist, songwriter
- Instruments: Guitar; vocals
- Years active: 2020–present
- Website: instagram.com/mateusasato/

Mateus Asato (29 December 1994) is a guitarist from Campo Grande, Brazil. He rose to fame by posting videos of himself playing guitar on Instagram, and has since amassed over one million followers. He has toured with several pop stars as a guitarist, including Tori Kelly, Jessie J, and Bruno Mars. Mateus also has his own signature guitar with Suhr Guitars.

== Career ==
In 2013 he attended the Musicians Institute in Los Angeles, California. His career began when industry professionals discovered him through his Instagram account. He then toured with Tori Kelly and Jessie J. Asato also began to do guitar clinics in South Korea and in Singapore. In 2019 Guitar Magazine named him one of the 50 most exciting young guitarists in the world. He has also played some shows in Las Vegas along with Bruno Mars. American musician John Mayer described Asato as "one of the best guitar players around."

In February 2021, Asato shut down his popular Instagram account, saying he needed a break from social media and felt a lack of musical inspiration. He reopened it on 31 March 2022.

=== Signature guitar ===
Suhr Guitars, a boutique luthier, released a signature guitar for Asato. At the 2020 NAMM Show Suhr guitars revealed a new Mateus Asato signature guitar would be released soon.

=== Awards ===
- Brazilian guitar contest "Double Vision" winner. 500 contestants.
- 2014 Outstanding Guitar Player of Musician's Institute

=== Style ===
He has developed his own fingerstyle method of picking, one heavily reliant on hybrid picking. His playing style incorporates jazz influences, double stops, and complex single-string and chord slides. Guitar World magazine called his style neo soul.

== Personal life ==
His grandparents were of Japanese descent and came from Okinawa, Japan. He began playing guitar at ten. In 2013, when he was 19 years old, he moved to Los Angeles, California.

In 2024, Mateus married Maju Trindade, a Brazilian actress, model, and YouTuber. He now lives in Brazil.
