= Maju Trindade =

Brazilian actress, model and YouTuber

- Born: Maria Júlia Trindade Frias Devásio Asato; June 13, 1998 (age 28); Catanduva, SP
- Occupation: Youtuber • influencer • model • actress
- Years active: 2011-present
- Spouse: Mateus Asato (c. 2024)
- Modeling information
- Height: 1.63
- Hair color: Brown
- Eye color: Brown

Maria Júlia Trindade Frias Devásio Asato (born June 13, 1998) is a Brazilian youtuber and influencer

She has participated in several campaigns for brands such as C&A, Hellman's, Ambev, Adidas and among other companies. Maju Trindade wrote her first book "Maju" released in 2016.

== Biography ==
Maju was born in Catanduva, in the state of São Paulo. She married guitarist Mateus Asato in 2024.

== Filmography ==
=== Film ===
Year	Title	Role	Notes
2017	Os Penetras 2 – Quem Dá Mais?	Herself	Supporting

== Awards and nominations ==
Year	Award	Category	Result	Ref
2016	Meus Prêmios Nick	Gata Trendy	Nominated	
2019	MTV Millennial Awards Brasil	Rock it in style	Won	
2020	Meus Prêmios Nick	Digital Content of the Year	Nominated	
