= Nanda Loren =

Brazilian singer

- Born: Nanda Farias; 18 May 1988 (age 38); Santos, São Paulo, Brasil
- Genres: pop; pop punk; rap rock; pop rock
- Occupations: singer; songwriter; record producer
- Instruments: Vocals; guitar; Fl Studio
- Years active: 2011–present
- Labels: Som Livre; OneRPM

Nanda Loren (born 18 May 1988), whose birth name is Nanda Farias, is a Brazilian singer, known for the hits "A Original", "Mirangem" and "Vou Estar Com Você". Before hitting hits in Brazil, the artist participated in The Voice Brasil on Rede Globo and Raul Gil Program on SBT.

== Biography and career ==
At the age of 11 she moved from Brazil together with her family to Florida in the United States, there she worked as a nanny and in a cell phone store. In 2010 she decided to return to Brazil, Nanda Loren started her music career in 2011, when she was one of the contestants on the talent show "Jovens Talentos - Programa Raul Gil", her first TV performance was the song "I Will Survive" by Gloria Gaynor. In 2015, she released her debut single called "A Original" and the track was a hit on Brazilian radio. In 2016, the artist participated in Rede Globo's The Voice Brasil program and was part of the team of singer Michel Teló. In 2020 the singer performed at the BreakTudo Awards 2020, singing her hit "Vou Estar Com Você", which was one of the songs awarded at the awards ceremony. In the same year she was also nominated for the Prêmio Jovem Brasileiro and the Prêmio Pop Mais. Its most recent release is the single "Miragem", which had its clip recorded in Los Angeles.

== Discography ==
- A Original (EP)

=== Singles ===
- A Original
- Neon Lights
- Áudio de Desculpas
- Vou Estar Com Você
- Miragem
- Não Há Nada

== filmography ==
- Jovens Talentos - 2011
- Programa Panico Joven Pan - 2015
- The Voice Brasil - 2016
- BreakTudo Awards 2020 - 2020

== Awards and nominations ==
=== Prêmio Jovem Brasileiro ===
Year	Nominee / work	Award	Result
Prêmio Jovem Brasileiro 2020	Herself	Aposta PJB	Nominated

=== Prêmio POP Mais ===
Year	Nominee / work	Award	Result
Prêmio Pop Mais	Herself	Aposta POPnow	Nominated
