= Expo Silesia =

Coordinates: 50.313201°N 19.199553°E

Silesia Expo
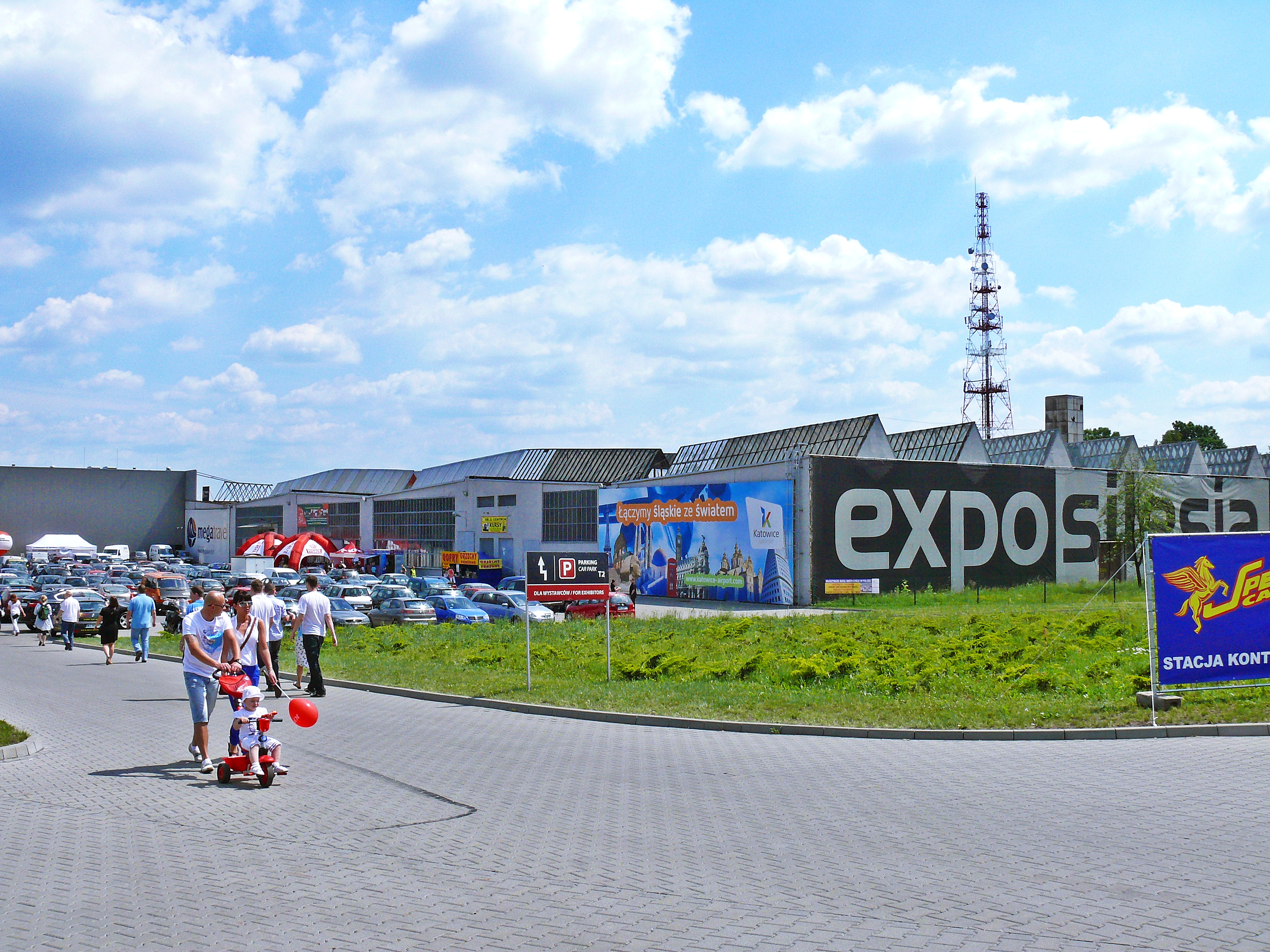
- Expo Silesia main building
- Company type: Limited liability company (Poland)
- Industry: Trade fair
- Founded: 2008 in Sosnowiec
- Founder: Kolporter Expo Sp. z o.o.
- Defunct: 2021
- Headquarters: Sosnowiec, Poland

Expo Silesia is a former exhibition and trade fair center located in the city of Sosnowiec, Poland in the Silesian Voivodeship, located on the border with Dąbrowa Górnicza, 12 km from Katowice.

The center provided exhibitors with 13.5 thousand m^{2} of exhibition space in an air-conditioned pavilion, 20 thousand m^{2} of external exhibition space, car parks for 1500 cars and a conference center that can serve up to 8060 guests, conference rooms that can be divided into smaller modules for 50 to 200 people, merged up to 400 people; In the form of a banquet or concert hall, the halls could accommodate up to 14,000 people.

The center was located in place of the Silma factory, and was funded by Kolporter Expo Ltd (a member of the Kolporter Group).

== Selected Events ==
- ExpoWelding International Welding Fair - since 2008;
- International Trade Fair of Machine Tools, Tools and Processing Technology Toolex - since 2008;
- SIBEX Modern Home and Garden Fair;
- OILexpo Trade Fair for Oils, Lubricants and Process Fluids in Industry;
