= Gio Bianco =

Brazilian singer

- Born: Giovanna Bianco; 1 January 1983 (age 42); São Paulo, Brazil
- Occupations: Singer; Songwriter; Author
- Years active: 2015–present
- Musical career
- Genres: MPB; Jazz; Bossa Nova; Pop
- Instrument: Vocals
- Labels: Midas Music
- Website: giobiancooficial

Gio Bianco (born Giovanna Bianco; 1983) is a Brazilian singer, songwriter, and author, with a degree in journalism.

== Biography ==
Gio Bianco was born into a musical family and began singing at the age of nine. Her mother, Eliane Bianco, is a pianist, and her brother is a composer.

Her professional career began in 2015, and by 2018 she started promoting her original work. She gained national recognition as a judge on the musical reality show Canta Comigo, a collaboration between Netflix and Record TV, hosted by Rodrigo Faro.

With growing visibility, Gio Bianco has steadily increased her social media following, reaching over 100,000 followers. In 2020, she began releasing original music under Midas Music, the label founded by Rick Bonadio. She was nominated in the "Breakout Artist" category at the BreakTudo Awards, which honors achievements in music, internet, and television.

In 2023, her reinterpretations of Brazilian hits gained significant airplay on MPB-focused radio stations. Her cover of Ivete Sangalo’s "Não Precisa Mudar" topped the MPB charts from August 2023, according to Crowley Broadcast Analysis Brazil. Other notable covers include "Só Tinha de Ser com Você" by Tom Jobim and "Sozinho" by Peninha.

Previously, Gio Bianco had already made waves with a duet alongside André Mota on "Ainda Lembro" by Marisa Monte, which held the top spot on MPB radio for five consecutive months.

Later in 2023, she released the album Covers, featuring renditions of songs by Rita Lee, Cyndi Lauper, and others. In 2024, she plans to release a fully original album, moving away from covers and reinterpretations. For this project, she is collaborating with producer Silvera, known for his work with Ed Motta and Racionais MC's.

== Discography ==
=== Studio albums ===
Title	Year	Release date	Notes
E por Falar em Amor...	2024	23 April 2024	First full-length studio album

=== Extended plays ===
Title	Year	Notes
Versões	2023	Includes reinterpretations of Brazilian classics

== Singles ==
Title	Year	Notes
Sozinho	2025	Cover of Peninha's hit
Gostoso Demais	2025	
Arpoador	2024	
Hora de Ficar	2024	
Não Precisa Mudar	2023	Cover of Ivete Sangalo; topped MPB radio charts
Ainda Lembro	2023	Duet with André Mota; cover of Marisa Monte
Só Tinha de Ser Com Você	2023	Cover of Tom Jobim
Sobe O Soom	2023	
Mania de Você	2022	Cover of Rita Lee
Hora de Ficar	2022	Early version
Vem Pra Ficar	2021	
Me Leva	2020	Remix released with Vee Brondi

== Charted singles ==
Title	Year	Chart Positions
Title	Year	TOP 10 MPB – Crowley Charts
Não Precisa Mudar	2023	1
Ainda Lembro	2023	1
