= Bad Reichenhall Ice Rink =

2006 building collapse in Bavaria, Germany

Coordinates: 47.734°N 12.887°E

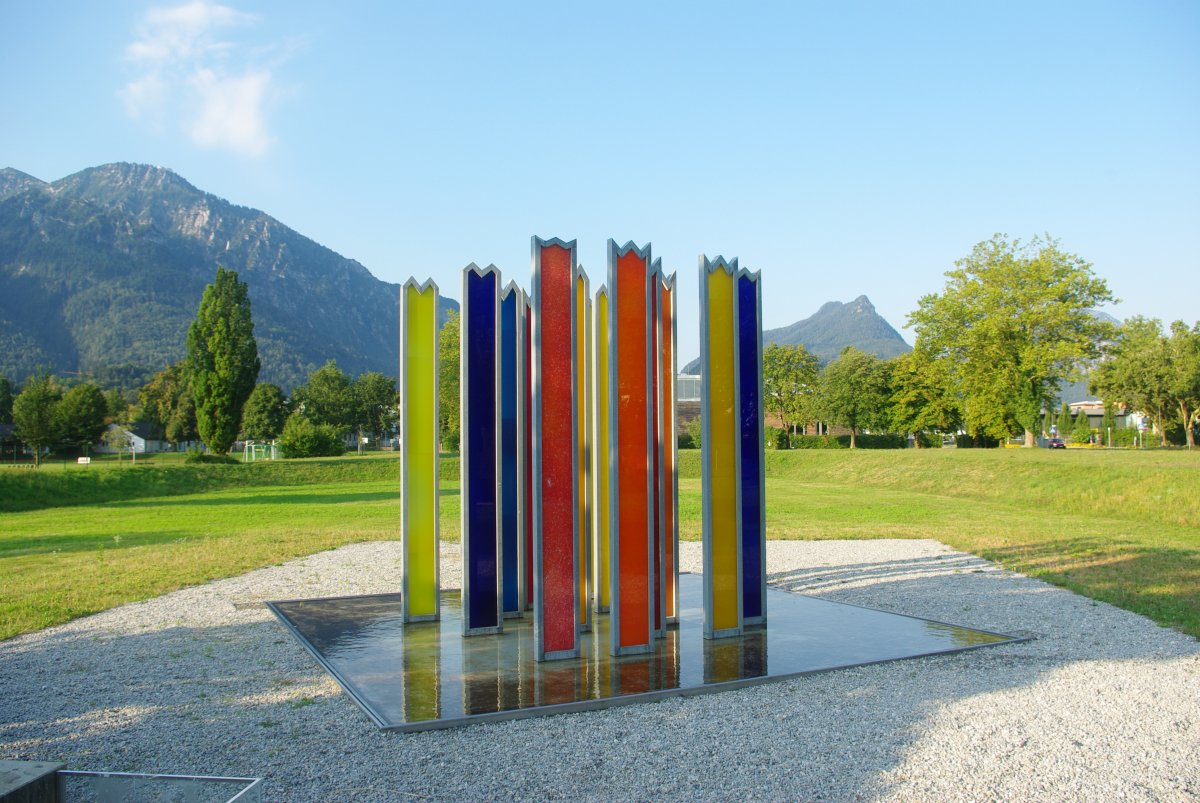
Memorial located on the grounds of the former ice rink

The Bad Reichenhall ice skating and swimming hall was a combined ice skating and swimming hall in the town of Bad Reichenhall, Bavaria, Germany, near the Austrian border. It was built between 1971 and 1973 by the city of Bad Reichenhall based on a design by the architect Hans Jürgen Schmidt-Schicketanz. At approximately 15:54 UTC on Monday 2 January 2006, the roof of the ice skating rink collapsed due to construction defects following heavy snowfall. Fifteen people perished in the accident, twelve of whom were children. Thirty-four were injured. The last body was recovered early on 5 January. Weather conditions in the area were extremely severe, an avalanche having killed three people nearby earlier in the day.

The rescue was temporarily halted on 3 January due to fears that the walls of the ice rink could collapse, endangering firefighters, police and rescue workers. However it resumed in the early hours of the next morning.

The accident provoked outrage in the town as it emerged that officials had halted the training session of an ice hockey team inside the rink due to fears that the wall could collapse. Prior to the disaster, officials had planned to close the ice rink on Monday 2 January as snowfall was continuing. However, as many meteorologists pointed out, the weather and snow conditions were not unusual for the time of the year as the town lies in a popular winter sport area of Southern Germany.

In 2007, the remains of the entire complex were finally demolished.

== Construction and use ==
Under the impression of the preparations for the Olympic Games in Munich in 1972, the then Mayor of Reichenhall Max Neumeyer ( CSU ) and the city council pursued the goal of establishing a center for school sports, recreation and prophylaxis in the city, which it was hoped would send a clear signal . A modern sports hall had already been built in 1970 at a cost of over 2.2 million DM; Only a year later, the most ambitious project by far was the combined ice skating, tennis and swimming hall (15.4 million DM), which was unprecedented in the region in terms of the generosity of its execution and covered a catchment area far beyond the Traunstein area was aligned. The ice skating and swimming hall was built right next to the sports hall in the new development area on Münchner Allee.

The roof construction consisted of hollow box girders as the main beam, this construction principle is very labor-intensive and is therefore no longer common; In contrast to the solid glulam beams that are common today, damage can occur inside the hollow girder that is hardly visible from the outside. The roof was provided with a very stiff infill at right angles to the box girders.

=== Ice skating rink ===
The ice skating rink formed the northeastern part of the facility, and there was an underground car park under the ice skating area.

Part of the total hall area of 75 m × 48 m was the ice surface, which at 60 m × 30 m was also suitable for international competitions. The total volume of the hall, which was subsequently glazed on all sides in 1974, was 69,814 m ^{3} . In winter the hall was used as an ice skating rink and the rest of the time as a tennis hall.

The hall served, among other things, the ice hockey club EAC Bad Reichenhall as a training and competition facility.

==== Swimming pool ====
The swimming pool formed the southwestern part of the complex. The hall was – with the exception of the area of the changing rooms and the restaurant – completely glazed from northwest to southwest, so from the inside you had a view of the surrounding mountains with Untersberg, Lattengebirge, Reiter Alm, Müllnerberg, Sonntagshorn as well as Zwiesel, Staufen and Fuderheuberg . The hall was equipped with a competition pool with six lanes of 25 m each, a diving pool with 1, 3 and 5 m high diving boards, a non-swimmer pool and a children's pool.

The swimming pool also had an outdoor area in the south with a terrace. However, this was only used in the first few years after it opened and was later no longer opened due to a lack of interest from visitors.

=== Intermediate building ===
Between the ice skating hall and swimming pool there was an entrance hall, the checkout area, technical rooms and, in the early years, a kiosk with skate rentals.

There was a restaurant on the upper floor at the level of the top tiers of the stands. This could be accessed directly from both halls and also via the entrance hall.

== Collapse ==
On 2 January 2006, at around 3:54 p.m., the roof of the northeastern part of the facility collapsed over the ice rink. This was preceded by heavy snowfall in the region.

At the time of the accident, the public run was still taking place, with over 50 people in the hall. The SSC Bad Reichenhall training session was planned for 4:00 p.m. However, the ice master decided at 3:30 p.m. to close the hall at the end of the public run and to cancel the training. Although the snow load was still below the load limit set at the time, so no immediate clearing was necessary, due to further snowfalls that had been announced, the roof should be cleared of snow before further use.

A few minutes before the closure, the roof unexpectedly collapsed .

After rescuing the first easily accessible injured people, the rescue of the victims progressed only slowly and took two days, as safety measures were first necessary on the collapsed roof parts and the external pillars. Later, the underground car park underneath the ice surface also had to be supported in order to ensure the safety of the helpers and any survivors when driving on the ice surface with heavy equipment. 15 people were killed, including 12 children and young people, and another 34 people were injured, some seriously. The autopsy of the dead revealed that all of them had died in the collapse and had not died of subsequent hypothermia .

The roof of the swimming pool withstood the masses of snow. The visitors in this part of the facility were able to leave the hall unscathed.

=== Investigations ===
The building materials technologist Bernd Hillemeier (Technische Universität Berlin) analyzed samples of the wooden roof construction on behalf of the ZDF magazine Frontal21 . According to him, glue based on urea resin was used, the adhesive effect of which weakens when exposed to moisture.

Immediately after the accident, the Traunstein public prosecutor's office got involved. Two experts were commissioned to carry out the technical investigation. The reports have been available since July 2006. Specific investigations were then started against eight people, including four (former) employees of the city of Bad Reichenhall, two planners and two former employees of the company that built the roof structure.

=== Consequences ===
The accident sparked a Germany-wide discussion about ensuring the safety of high-rise buildings. The then Federal Building Minister Wolfgang Tiefensee called on the responsible state building ministers to check the effectiveness of the relevant state building regulations. The media criticized the legal and administrative burden of the building inspection authorities, which are largely not led by construction experts. There were calls for a "construction TÜV ” for existing buildings based on the model of regular inspections of bridges and other engineering structures. Up to now, according to the state building regulations, high-rise buildings have only had to be checked during planning and construction – and only when they are of a certain size.

The first meeting of the "Roofs Working Group" of the Bavarian State Ministry of the Interior took place on 30 January 2006; The Secretary of State for the Interior, civil engineers and construction associations took part in this, among others. The working group is intended to scientifically support the research into causes and suggestions for consequences.

In addition to this meeting, the operators of halls and stadiums in Bavaria that have similar roofing began checking the roof structures; some halls were temporarily closed as a precaution (e.g. the ice rink in Geretsried, whose roof was in acute danger of collapsing was demolished in 2006). In particular, deficiencies that needed to be remedied were identified at the stadiums in Senden (closed for almost the entire remainder of the 2005/06 winter season) and in Deggendorf (temporarily closed in 2005/06). The ice rink in Rosenheim was temporarily closed at the beginning of February 2006 when suspicions arose that the same glue was used as in Bad Reichenhall.

The Werner-Rittberger-Halle (training hall for ice skating next to the Rheinlandhalle in Krefeld ) was shut down after the accident in Bad Reichenhall. The city commissioned a report to check the load-bearing capacity of the hall roof. The hall has been in operation again since September 2006, and the permitted snow load has been reduced as a precaution.

The ice rink in Göppingen was also temporarily shut down in March 2006 after the roof was checked. After a fire in July 2008, the hall was demolished in 2010.

The roof of the dolphinarium at Duisburg Zoo was dismantled in spring 2006 because moisture had also attacked the glued connections.

In July 2006, the ice stadium in Wiehl was closed after cracks were discovered in the glued beams .

Although the Traunstein public prosecutor's office did not investigate Mayor Wolfgang Heitmeier ( FWG ), he was sharply attacked by the public and national media after the roof collapsed and held responsible. In the local elections on 12 March 2006, Heitmeier missed the absolute majority required for re-election. He was well behind his challenger Dr. Herbert Lackner (CSU), against whom he lost in the runoff election on 26 March 2006.

=== Process ===
On 28 January 2008, the trial began before the Traunstein regional court against three defendants: the then construction manager and structural engineer for the roof structure, the then project manager of the architectural office and the author of a report from 2003. They were accused of negligent homicide and negligent bodily harm. The proceedings against an architect and former senior employee of the city of Bad Reichenhall were separated due to his health. The proceedings against another accused were also discontinued for health reasons; he died on 30 December 2007.

The focus of the evidence was the lack of tested statics (generally by a structural engineering test engineer). In this context, the public prosecutor's office was accused by the defense attorneys and the ranks of the co-plaintiffs of having investigated one-sidedly in the direction of those planning and executing the case. The city's responsibility as a developer and building supervisory authority was not sufficiently taken into account.

A verdict was originally scheduled to be handed down on 24 April 2008. However, the presiding judge scheduled further court dates at the main hearing on 28 February 2008, so that the trial dragged on until autumn. According to a witness statement on 12 June 2008, the city administration of Bad Reichenhall knew about the danger of their ice rink collapsing. The board of directors of the ice hockey club said that they had been warned by phone half an hour before the collapse that training in the evening would have to be canceled.

On 18 November 2008, the designer of the roof was found guilty of negligent homicide by the regional court for violating the duty of care and sentenced to 18 months' suspended imprisonment. The architect and the structural engineer were acquitted. The defense of the convicted civil engineer had announced an appeal, as had the public prosecutor's office, which was not satisfied with the two acquittals.

On 12 January 2010, the Federal Court of Justice (BGH) overturned the acquittal of the expert (graduate engineer specializing in civil engineering) and referred the matter back to another criminal division of the Traunstein Regional Court. In making its decision, the BGH cited deficiencies in the assessment of evidence at the time . In particular, the regional court did not explain in a comprehensible manner why the representatives of the city of Bad Reichenhall would not have acted differently even when the expert had clearly warned (for example, they would have cleared the roof or restricted the opening hours). The regional court also acquitted the expert in a second trial.

== Reallocation and redesign ==
The entire building complex was demolished by March 2007, with work stopping between December 2006 and January 2007.

A referendum took place in Bad Reichenhall on the future of the site . In which 53% of those who voted were in favor of building a new ice rink and swimming pool on the site, while the city was planning a tourism college there. In order to demonstrate the will of the majority of the population and to commemorate the victims of the collapse of the ice skating rink, the songwriter Hans Söllner, who had given a benefit concert in Reichenhall shortly after the accident for the benefit of the victims' relatives in the spring of 2006, organized from From 16 January to 10 February 2009 there was a sit-in on the site of the collapsed ice rink. Nevertheless, the city of Bad Reichenhall ignored the referendum and the demonstration, mainly for cost reasons, and stuck to the university, which was to be implemented on the site from September 2009 as the Bad Reichenhall campus of the IUBH School of Business and Management . However, the campus is now located at the hotel management school after the university did not extend the leasehold agreement for the site of the former ice skating and swimming hall in 2013 due to insufficient capacity utilization. The majority of the site is therefore currently undeveloped. In 2016 it became known that the Bavarian State Office for Weights and Measures, which was moving to Bad Reichenhall as part of a relocation of authorities, was to be rebuilt on the property.

At the beginning of 2010, a memorial was built on a small section of the former ice rink area, which was officially inaugurated on 20 November 2010. The planning for this, which began shortly after the accident, had previously come to a standstill in 2008 in an effort to find an amicable solution with all relatives. The city of Bad Reichenhall then, in consultation with a small circle of relatives, privately commissioned the artist Karl-Martin Hartmann . The costs for this memorial remained secret, but are said to have been in the range of several hundred thousand euros. Individual relatives had vehemently protested publicly against this project until the very end.

On 2 January 2016 at 3:54 p.m., the time of the tragic accident, in the presence of the mayor of Bad Reichenhall, Herbert Lackner, the relatives gathered at the memorial made of colorful glass steles and remembered the 15 people who were killed in the accident.Following the short, private memorial service, an ecumenical service was held in the Church of St. Zeno. This commemoration on the 10th anniversary of the accident was, among other things, also reported in the daily topics .

== See also ==
- Katowice Trade Hall roof collapse – a similar accident on 28 January 2006, in Katowice, Poland.
- List of structural failures and collapses
- Structural integrity and failure
- Structural robustness
