= Gabi Martins =

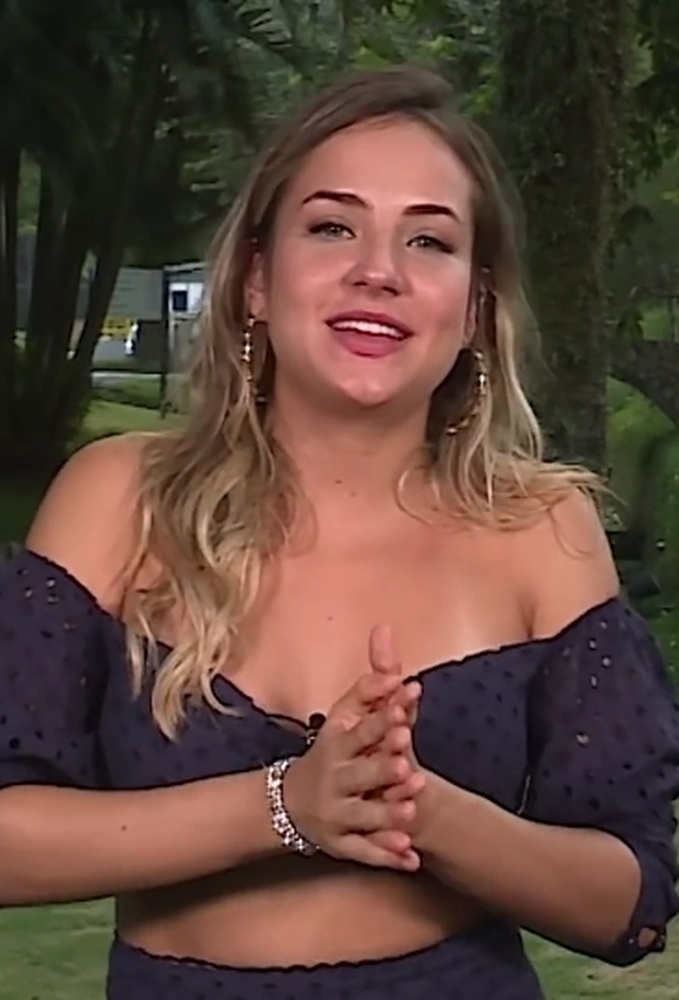
- Martins in 2020
- Born: Gabriela Piedade Martins; December 12, 1996 (age 29); Belo Horizonte, Minas Gerais, Brazil
- Occupations: Singer; songwriter
- Years active: 2015–present
- Musical career
- Genres: Sertanejo
- Instrument: Vocals
- Website: gabimartinsoficial.com.br

Gabriela Piedade “Gabi” Martins (born December 12, 1996), is a Brazilian singer and songwriter.

== Career ==
In 2018 she recorded her first album, self-titled, which contains her greatest success "Neném".

In 2020 she participated in the reality show Big Brother Brasil 20, as a celebrity, being the eleventh evicted of the program with 59,61% of votes against Thelma Assis (36,28%) and Babu Santana (4,11%).

== Singles ==
List of singles as lead artist
Title	Year	Album
"O Melhor de Mim"	2015	
"Menina de 18"	2016	
"Turbulência" (part. Nego do Borel)	2017	
"Neném"	2018	Gabi Martins
"Vestido Branco"	2018	Gabi Martins
"Deixa a Briga Lá Fora"	2018	Gabi Martins
"Bala e Canhão"	2018	Gabi Martins
"Raíz ou Nutella"	2020	
"Coração Ansioso"	2020	

== Filmography ==
Year	Title	Role	Notes
2020	Big Brother Brasil 20	Contestant (Herself)	10th Place

== Awards and nominations ==
Year	Award	Category	Result	Ref.
2020	Prêmio Jovem Brasileiro	Melhor Shipp	Nominated	
