= Bernardo Velasco =

- Born: Bernardo Velasco Gonçalves; January 30, 1986 (age 40); Niterói
- Occupation: social media personality
- Years active: 2004–present
- Known for: Belaventura, Malhação and "Pecado Mortal"

Bernardo Velasco (born 30 January 1986) is a Brazilian actor and model. He became known in Brazil for acting in Malhação on Rede Globo in 2011, in 2013 he acted in the soap opera "Pecado Mortal" on Record TV, A Terra Prometida, and in 2017 he was the protagonist of the soap opera Belaventura.

== Life and career ==
In 2004, at the age of eighteen, he was discovered by an agency scout, becoming a model, having quickly starred in several advertising campaigns and graced magazine covers.

In 2008, he participated in the romantic reality show Agora Vai, in the program Mais Você, by Ana Maria Braga. In 2011 he debuted as an actor on television in the nineteenth season of the telenovela Malhação, playing the character Nando.

In September 2013, he signs a contract with Rede Record and returns to TV in the telenovela Pecado Mortal, by Carlos Lombardi, in which he plays Romeu, romantic partner of actress Lua Blanco. In 2015, he was cast by Rede Record to play the character Eleazar in the soap opera Os Dez Mandamentos, acting in both seasons and continuing with the same character in the plot A Terra Prometida, totaling two years between biblical soap operas. In 2017 he played the character Enrico, protagonist of the telenovela Belaventura, on RecordTV. The following year, he participated in the fourth season of the reality show Dancing Brasil, being the tenth eliminated. In 2019 he is scheduled to play the character Matheus in the macroseries Jezabel, by RecordTV.

== Filmography ==
| Year | Title | Role | Notes | Ref. |
|---|---|---|---|---|
| 2008 | Agora Vai | Contestant | | |
| 2011–12 | Malhação | Fernando Peixoto (Nando) | Season 19 | |
| 2013 | Pecado Mortal | Romeu | | |
| 2015 | Os Dez Mandamentos | Eleazar | | |
| 2016 | A Terra Prometida | Eleazar | | |
| 2017 | Belaventura | Enrico Montebelo e Luxemburgo, Príncipe de Belaventura | | |
| 2018 | Dancing Brasil | Contestant | Season 4 | |
| 2019 | Jezabel | Matheus | | |
| 2021 | BreakTudo Awards | Host | | |
| 2022 | Télos | Bernardo | | |
| 2025 | Vale Tudo | Igor | | |

== Awards and nominations ==
| Year | Award | Category | Work | Result | Ref. |
|---|---|---|---|---|---|
| 2017 | Prêmio Contigo! | Ator Revelação | Belaventura | Nominated | |
