= Katowice International Fair =

Former international trade fair in Katowice, Poland

Coordinates: 50°17′25″N 19°00′08″E

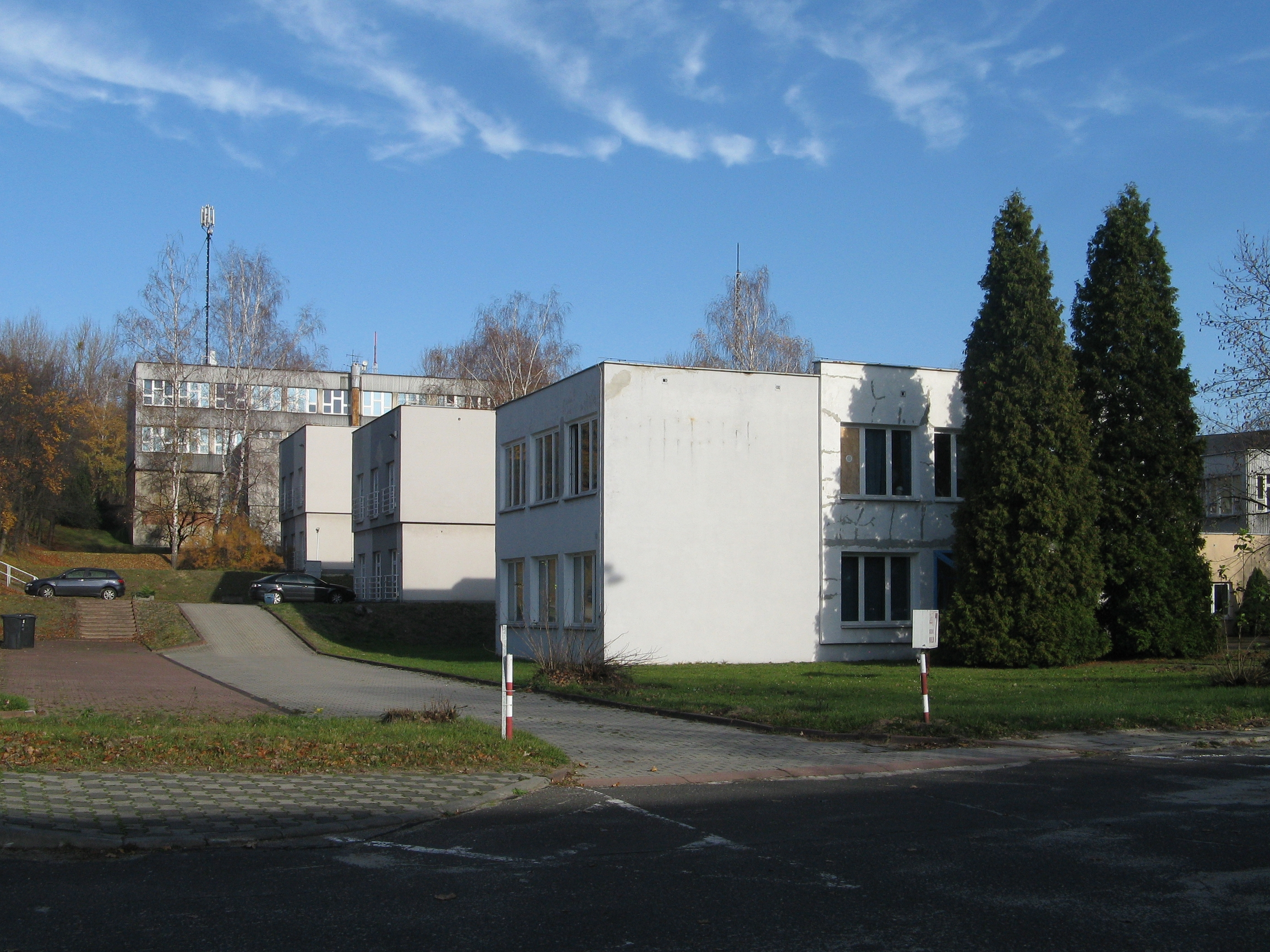
Chorzów, 5 Targowa Street

Katowice International Fair (Polish: Międzynarodowe Targi Katowickie, MTK) was an international trade fair in Katowice and one of the largest in Poland (the largest being the Poznań International Fair). A few dozen events were organized there each year, with the participation of some 4,500 companies.

== Location ==
The Katowice International Fair grounds are located in the Silesian Park, next to the Silesian Planetarium, in the heart of the Metropolis GZM. The fair features a few dozen exhibition halls, large open space area (about 24 ha), conference centers, its own hotel, etc.

== History ==
The grounds were opened as The Center of Technical Progress in 1963. For years, the activities were mostly non-commercial in nature, for example large exhibitions presenting achievement of the Soviet Union space program, at which young people and local space enthusiasts could view and even enter various space capsules (or their real-size mock-ups) and obtain related technical information. After the 1989 transition to the market economy, they grounds took up a more commercial character.

== Accident ==
In January 2006 the fair was the site of the Katowice Trade Hall roof collapse.

== See also ==
- Expo Silesia - another trade fair center in Metropolis GZM
