= Francinne =

Brazilian singer (born 1993)

- Born: Francine de Almeida Porto; 22 December 1993 (age 32); Porto Alegre, Rio Grande do Sul, Brazil
- Occupations: Singer; songwriter
- Years active: 2011–present
- Musical career
- Genres: Pop; electropop; reggaeton; funk carioca; dubstep
- Label: Universal Music

Francine de Almeida Porto (born 22 December 1993), known mononymously as Francinne, is a Brazilian singer who is known for the hits "Tum Tum" partner with Wanessa Camargo and "Segue o Baile" with Clau.

== Biography and career ==
Francinne began her career in 2011, officially covering Britney Spears in Brazil. In 2015, she released her debut single "I'm Alive", and the track was featured on the official soundtrack of Rede Globo's soap opera "Babilônia".

She also lent her voice to TV commercials and other dubbing projects and assisted with the composition of songs for the soundtracks of SBT's soap operas Carinha de Anjo and As Aventuras de Poliana.

In 2017, she signed with Universal Music label, now pursuing a solo career as Francinne, scoring hits such as ‘Tum Tum’ with Wanessa Camargo, ‘Cinderelas’ with Rebecca and "Aceleradinha" with MC Zaac. After numerous releases, she caught the attention of South Korean artists and received an invitation from singer Spax to share the vocals of the song "Te Quiero Mas". This song, a duet in two Korean and Portuguese languages, marked the first musical partnership between the two nations, catching the attention of South Korean businessmen who landed her an artistic career contract announcing a K-POP project and her going to South Korea to record a single and MV.

After the international experience, the singer released her first EP entitled TAKEDOWN.

The singer landed on July 12, 2021, in South Korea to finalize her international project and debut in South Korean territory.

== Discography ==
- Corpo Caliente (2018)
- Bom Demais (2018)
- TumTum (2018)
- Segue o Baile (2019)
- Aceleradinha (2019)
- Cinderelas (2019)
- Sintonia (2020)
- Te Quiero Mas (2020)
- Atura ou Surta (2020)
- Takedown (2021)
