= Katowice Trade Hall roof collapse =

2006 roof collapse at Katowice International Fair in Poland

Coordinates: 50°17′20.9″N 19°00′14.4″E

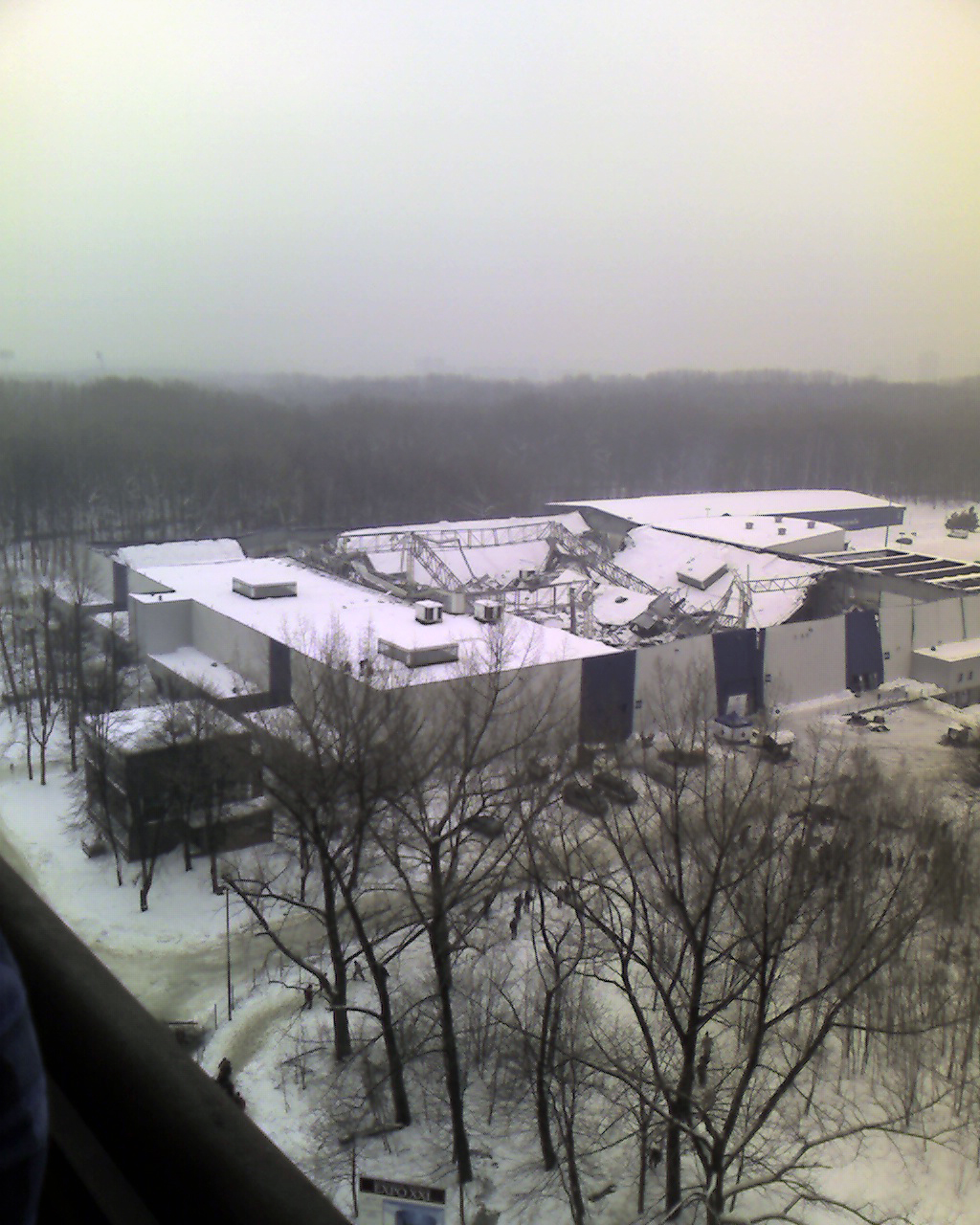
- The hall after the collapse
- Date: 28 January 2006
- Time: 17:15 (GMT+1)
- Venue: Katowice International Fair
- Location: Katowice/Chorzów, Poland
- Type: Roof collapse
- Deaths: 65
- Injuries: 170+

On 28 January 2006, the roof of one of the buildings at the Katowice International Fair (Polish: Międzynarodowe Targi Katowickie) collapsed in Chorzów/Katowice, Poland. 65 people died in this incident.

At 16:15 GMT (17:15 local time), the central section of the roof of the hall collapsed, possibly due to the weight of snow on the building. According to the police there were roughly 700 people in the hall at the time of the collapse. A further collapse occurred 90 minutes later during rescue operations. Polish government spokesman Krzysztof Mejer confirmed that there had been 65 dead as well as more than 170 injured, including 13 foreigners. There are confirmed deaths of ten foreign tourists – one from Belgium, one from Germany, three from Slovakia, one from the Netherlands, one from Hungary and three from the Czech Republic. The trade hall was hosting the 56th National Exhibition of Carrier Pigeons, with over 120 exhibitors from all over Europe. Poland was at that time experiencing very cold weather with heavy snow. This meant that the rescue operation was undertaken in sub-zero temperatures, putting the survivors inside the building at risk of exposure.

== Rescue operation ==
Rescue support was sent from the surrounding area, including Katowice, as well as from the neighbouring province of Lesser Poland. Since parts of the collapsed structure were supported only by heaps of snow, the rescue teams could not heat the pockets beneath the collapsed roof with hot air, fearing that the roof might collapse even further.

The search and rescue action was terminated on the afternoon of Sunday 29 January 2006 as, according to Janusz Skulich, commander of the Silesian Fire Fighters, the probability of rescuing any more survivors from beneath the collapsed roof was by then close to zero. Heavy equipment is reported to have started clearing the area of the remaining rubble.

The rescue action was carried out by 103 firefighter teams (more than 1000 firefighters altogether), EMS units as well as 230 policemen with dogs, military police units from Kraków and Gliwice, the GOPR mountain rescue team of Szczyrk and specialists from the mine rescue team of Bytom. Survivors were taken to nearby hospitals in Chorzów and Katowice, and to other towns of the region, including Siemianowice Śląskie, Bytom, Sosnowiec, Ruda Śląska, Dąbrowa Górnicza and Piekary Śląskie. Andrzej Skrzyś, vice-president of Polish Society of Carrier-Pigeons said that by Saturday the rescue services had brought over 1,000 pigeons to the office of the society, that were being fed and watered by pigeon-fanciers from Chorzów until the arrival of their owners.

On 30 January 2006, there were 67 confirmed deaths and about 30 missing people. Later that day the number of victims was revised down to 62 confirmed deaths. On 31 January three more bodies were found in the ruins of MTK, raising the death toll to 65. Next day, officials stated that due to irregularities by funeral houses and dissection rooms, the wrong number of victims had been reported, and on 1 February there were 63 confirmed deaths. On 11 and 14 February, the bodies of the 64th and 65th victims of roof collapse were found.

In the morning of 19 February, workers got to the last area of the hall that was still covered by fragments of the hall's collapsed roof. They found no more victims but found two pigeons that were still alive after spending 22 days trapped under the rubble.

== Aftermath and investigation ==
After the tragedy, senior authorities arrived at the scene, including the Prime Minister Kazimierz Marcinkiewicz and the President of Poland Lech Kaczyński. The latter declared the period until 1 February to be national days of mourning.

On Tuesday, 21 February, at 0600 hours Central European Time (0500 UTC) three people were arrested and brought to the Katowice District Prosecutor's Office: New Zealand–born chairman of the International Katowice Fair Board of Management Bruce Robinson (who was also a managing director of the London–based Expomedia company that owned a 51% share in MTK), deputy chairman Ryszard Ziółek, and the company's technical manager Adam Hildebrandt. They were interviewed and charged with criminal negligence – allegedly they were aware of the fact that the building was unsafe and yet allowed the Fair to go on, and by doing so they contributed to deaths of 65 people. The spokesperson for the Prosecutor's Office did not rule out laying other charges in the future – depending on facts established by experts on causes of the building's collapse. A search warrant was also executed at Robinson's Warsaw apartment. The charges carried a maximum of 8 years imprisonment. Prosecutors also applied to the court for the accused to be detained for 3 months. The application was granted by the court, their application for bail was refused. A judge is quoted as saying that immediately after the catastrophe the accused destroyed some vital documents and there exists a possibility that if they were released on bail they would intimidate witnesses to change their testimonies. Their appeal against arrest was rejected by the District Court on 5 May.

After interviewing some 200 witnesses, the analysis of company documents, experts' findings and data from the company's computers (some of which was recovered by computer specialists) the prosecutors allege that the accused were responsible for failing to remove heavy snow and ice from the building's roof, and also that in the past, the roof had gotten damaged and yet they carried out only emergency repairs and did not report the damage to a building inspector as required by Polish law. Earlier the managers claimed both that the snow was removed from the roof and that it was impossible for them to clear the roof because a Tax Office seized their accounts due to tax arrears. A spokesperson for the Tax Office refuted this claim saying that only some of the company's cash was seized and amounts remaining should have been more than sufficient to pay for snow and ice removal.

On 31 March 2006, the commission investigating causes of the disaster released a preliminary report into their findings. They found numerous design and construction flaws that contributed to the speed of the collapse. The snow from the roof was not being removed which resulted in construction overload by more than 100%. Moreover, in 2002 the construction buckled under the heavy snow; contrary to the regulations the hall was repaired without getting a building inspector's clearance and without doing necessary tests and calculations to determine if the construction was stable and had sufficient strength.

On Monday, 26 June 2006, three architects who designed the hall were arrested. Two were charged with "wilfully causing a building catastrophe" and by this causing the death of 65 people, the third one was charged with "involuntarily causing a building catastrophe." The prosecutor alleges that Jacek J. and Szczepan K. made several errors and introduced several amendments to the project that were not agreed upon. Both were aware of the fact that in January 2000 the roof buckled under the weight of the snow, yet they did not take any steps to remedy the situation and perhaps prevent the tragedy. The third architect, Andrzej W., is charged with approving the project despite its errors and deficiencies. The charges are the result of reports made by experts on building, steel constructions and reinforced concrete constructions. Pursuant to Polish law that automatically grants the accused name suppression, the surnames of the accused are unavailable in the Polish media.

On 14 February 2007, the Court of Appeal in Katowice granted bail to the three top bosses of the company – Bruce Robinson, Ryszard Ziółek, and Adam Hildebrandt. Robinson had to pay a 100,000 zloty bond (approx. €25,000/$33,000/£17,000), and the other two – 50,000 zloty each. All three also had to remain under police supervision and had to surrender their passports. The prosecutor appealed against granting of bail while one of the accused appealed against the amount. On Monday, 5 March 2007, the Court of Appeal in Katowice rejected both appeals and at the same time raised the amount that Bruce Robinson has to deposit to 300,000 zloty (about €75,000/$100,000/£50,000). The ruling was final.

As a result of the catastrophe, in March 2007 Polish building law was amended. Large buildings must now undergo a technical survey twice every year (before and after winter) to make sure they are safe and structurally sound. Failure to conduct the survey is punishable by a minimum 1,000 zloty fine or a term in prison.

== Indictment and trial ==
The investigation was formally completed at the end of June 2008. The public prosecutor of the Katowice District Public Prosecutor's Office decided to indict 12 people. These include the designers of the hall, Jacek J. and Szczepan K., who on conviction for "directly endangering lives of other people" faced up to 12 years of prison, two members of the board, Bruce Robinson and Ryszard Ziółek, and 7 other people, who if convicted for gross negligence would face up to 8 years in jail, and the Chorzów County building inspector who faced lesser charges. The indictment was filed with the court on 18 July.

The experts determined that the main reason for the catastrophe was incorrect design. It was changed in order to make the construction cheaper. Emails recovered from seized computers proved that members of the Board of Directors were fully aware of the problems and of an expert's recommendation that snow be removed from the roof and that the design was verified. One of the indicted, technical coordinator Piotr I., was charged with failing to order the evacuation doors to be opened; he is the only one that pleaded guilty. In the course of the investigation, it was found that none of the victims died because of locked evacuation doors.

Post-mortems carried out on victims have shown that none of them died of exposure; all died because of injuries sustained because of the collapse of the roof.

== Location of MTK ==
There has been some confusion over whether MTK is located in Katowice or Chorzów. The registered and street addresses of the company are in Katowice, and the entrance to the grounds is from a street that belongs administratively to Katowice. However, the company's grounds—and thus the site of the catastrophe—lie within Chorzów's administrative boundaries.

== Nationalities of the victims ==
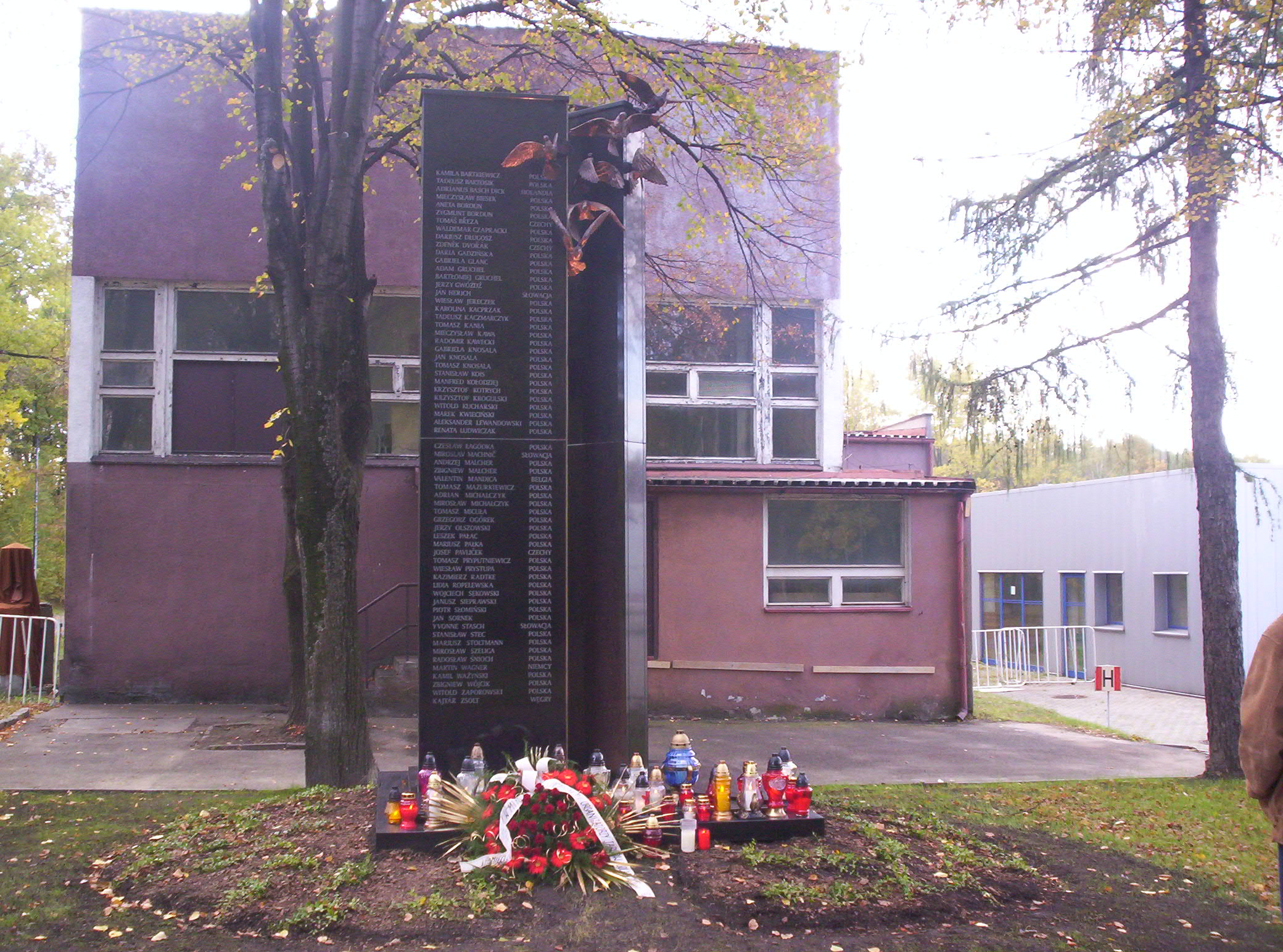
Memorial to the collapse victims in Katowice

Nationality	Victims
Poland	55
Czech Republic	3
Slovakia	3
Belgium	1
Germany	1
Hungary	1
Netherlands	1
Total	65

== See also ==
- List of Poland disasters by death toll
- Bad Reichenhall ice rink roof collapse – a similar incident in Germany on 2 January 2006 which killed fifteen.
- List of structural failures and collapses
- Structural integrity and failure
- Structural robustness
