= MTK (musical group) =

Brazilian musical group

- Origin: Brazil
- Genres: Pop
- Instruments: Vocals; guitar; piano; sampler
- Labels: Sony Music Brasil
- Members: Meucci; Agatha; Tasdan

MTK is a Brazilian pop and rap group, formed by Meucci, Agatha and Tasdan, he owns the hits "Idas e Vindas" and "Álcool na Madrugada", which have millions of views and have reached positions of highlights in the Brazilian charts. In 2018, he signed a contract with the label Sony Music Brazil.

== Biography and career ==
The MTK group emerged before as a musical label to help independent artists, in 2017 it became a musical group and in 2018 it got its first hit "Idas e Vindas", which today has more than 16 million views on YouTube and millions of views on YouTube. The first single from the group called Idas e Vindas is a collaboration with singer Lipe, the track entered the Singles do Brasil chart and the Spotify Brasil chart. The group's most recent hit is called "Se Você Vier", in collaboration with the singers Anchietx and Cammie.

== Discography ==
=== Albuns ===
- Original MTK
- Recores (2021)

=== Singles ===
- Idas e Vindas
- Original MTK #1 - Exceção
- Álcool na Madrugada
- Pode Me Esperar
- Perco a Hora
- Tudo Igual
