= List of 1990s deaths in popular music =

Following is a list of notable performers of rock and roll music or rock music, and others directly associated with the music as producers, songwriters or in other closely related roles, who have died in the 1990s. The list gives their date, cause and location of death, and their age.

Rock music developed from the rock and roll music that emerged during the 1950s, and includes a diverse range of subgenres. The terms "rock and roll" and "rock" each have a variety of definitions, some narrow and some wider. In determining criteria for inclusion, this list uses as its basis reliable sources listing "rock deaths" or "deaths in rock and roll", as well as such sources as the Rock and Roll Hall of Fame.

Preceded by 1980s	List of deaths in popular music 1990s	Succeeded by 2000s

== 1990 ==
Name	Age	Date	Location	Cause of death
George Auld	70	January 8, 1990	Palm Springs, California, U.S.	Lung cancer
Gene Phillips	74	January 10, 1990	Lakewood, California, U.S.	Unknown
B.B. Gabor	41 or 42	January 17, 1990	Toronto, Ontario, Canada	Suicide
Melanie Appleby; Mel and Kim	23	January 18, 1990	Westminster, London, England	Pneumonia
Allen Collins; Lynyrd Skynyrd	37	January 23, 1990	Jacksonville, Florida, U.S.	Pneumonia
Peter Sweval; Starz, Looking Glass	42	January 23, 1990	Los Angeles, California, United States	AIDS or unknown causes
Norval Taborn; The Four Vagabonds	74	January 23, 1990	Chicago, Illinois, United States	Unknown
Puma Jones; Black Uhuru	36	January 28, 1990	New York City, New York, U.S.	Breast cancer
Mel Lewis	60	February 2, 1990	New York City, New York, U.S.	Brain cancer and melanoma
Felice Chiusano; Singer, member of Quartetto Cetra	67	February 3, 1990	Milan, Italy	Unknown
Del Shannon	55	February 8, 1990	Santa Clarita, California, U.S.	Suicide by gunshot
Johnnie Ray	63	February 24, 1990	Los Angeles, California, U.S.	Liver failure
Cornell Gunter; The Coasters, The Flairs, The Platters	53	February 26, 1990	Las Vegas, Nevada, U.S.	Shot in his automobile
Dave Prichard; Armored Saint	26	February 28, 1990	Los Angeles County, California, United States	Leukemia
Shakey Jake Harris	68	March 2, 1990	Forrest City, Arkansas, U.S.	Unknown
Ric Grech; Family, Traffic, Blind Faith	43	March 17, 1990	Leicester, England	Liver and kidney failure
Andrew Wood; Malfunkshun, Mother Love Bone	24	March 19, 1990	Seattle, Washington, U.S.	Heroin overdose
Al Sears	80	March 23, 1990	New York City, U.S.	Lung cancer
Sarah Vaughan	66	April 3, 1990	Hidden Hills, California, U.S.	Lung cancer
Thurston Harris; The Sharps	58	April 14, 1990	Pomona, California, U.S.	Heart attack
Sabicas	78	April 16, 1990	New York City, U.S.	Complications from pneumonia and multiple strokes
Little Joe Blue	55	April 22, 1990	Reno, Nevada, U.S.	Stomach cancer
Rufus "Speedy" Jones	53	April 25, 1990	Los Angeles, California, U.S.	Unknown
Dexter Gordon	67	April 25, 1990	Philadelphia, Pennsylvania, U.S.	Kidney failure and throat cancer
Wesley Rose; Music industry executive and record producer	72	April 26, 1990	Nashville, Tennessee, U.S.	Unknown
Floyd Butler; The Friends of Distinction	52	April 29, 1990	Los Angeles, California, United States	Heart attack
Sammy Lawhorn	54	April 29, 1990	Chicago, Illinois, U.S.	Natural causes
Emily Remler	32	May 4, 1990	Sydney, Australia	Heart attack
Luigi Nono Italian composer	66	May 8, 1990	Venice, Italy	
Jim Henson; Creator of The Muppets; charted on the Billboard Hot 100 as the vocalist of "Rubber Duckie" and "Rainbow Connection"	53	May 16, 1990	New York City, New York, U.S.	Toxic shock syndrome caused by a group A streptococcal infection
Sammy Davis Jr.	64	May 16, 1990	Beverly Hills, California, U.S.	Throat cancer
Morris Levy; Record producer for Roulette Records	62	May 21, 1990	Ghent, New York, U.S.	Liver cancer
Gary Usher; The Beach Boys, The Byrds	51	May 25, 1990	Los Angeles, California, U.S.	Cancer
Stiv Bators; Dead Boys, The Lords of the New Church	40	June 4, 1990	Paris, Île-de-France, France	Traumatic brain injury
Richard Sohl; Patti Smith	37	June 5, 1990	Cherry Grove, New York, U.S.	Heart attack
Jim Hodder; Steely Dan	42	June 5, 1990	Point Arena, California, U.S.	Drowning
Antonio Martinez; Los Bravos	45	June 19, 1990	Colmenar Viejo, Spain	Motorcycle accident
Kripp Johnson; The Del-Vikings	57	June 22, 1990	Pontiac, Michigan, United States	Prostate cancer
Isaac Payton Sweat; Bassist for Johnny Winter	45	June 23, 1990	Richmond, Texas, United States	Shot to death
Rob Graves; Bags, 45 Grave, The Gun Club	35	June 28, 1990	New York City, New York, U.S.	Heroin overdose
Cazuza; Barão Vermelho	32	July 7, 1990	Rio de Janeiro, Brazil	AIDS-related septic shock
Trouble T Roy; Hip-hop dancer for Heavy D	22	July 15, 1990	Indianapolis, Indiana, U.S.	Accidental fall from building
Gerry Boulet; Offenbach	44	July 18, 1990	Longueuil, Quebec, Canada	Cancer/Colon cancer
Bert Sommer; The Left Banke	41	July 23, 1990	Troy, New York, U.S.	Respiratory illness
Brent Mydland; The Grateful Dead	37	July 26, 1990	Lafayette, California, U.S.	Speedball overdose
Bobby Day	60	July 27, 1990	Los Angeles, California, U.S.	Prostate cancer
Larry Birdsong	56	August 7, 1990	Nashville, Tennessee, U.S.	Unknown
Joel Rundell; Better Than Ezra	24	August 8, 1990	Baton Rouge, East Baton Rouge Parish, Louisiana, U.S.	Suicide
Brandon Mitchell; Wreckx-n-Effect	18	August 9, 1990	Manhattan, New York City, U.S.	Shot to death
Lafayette Leake	71	August 14, 1990	Chicago, Illinois, U.S.	Diabetic coma
Viktor Tsoi; Kino	28	August 15, 1990	Tukums, Latvian SSR, Soviet Union	Traffic accident
Bruno Lomas	50	August 17, 1990	La Pobla de Farnals, Valencia, Spain	Car accident
Grethe Ingmann; Winner of the 1963 Eurovision Song Contest with Jørgen Ingmann	52	August 18, 1990	Frederikssund, Denmark	Liver cancer
Boogie Bill Webb	66	August 22, 1990	New Orleans, Louisiana, U.S.	Unknown
Gianni Marzocchi; Italian singer and actor	56	August 25, 1990	Rome, Italy	Cancer
Stevie Ray Vaughan; Double Trouble	35	August 27, 1990	East Troy, Wisconsin, U.S.	Helicopter crash
Tom Fogerty; Creedence Clearwater Revival	48	September 6, 1990	Scottsdale, Arizona, U.S.	Tuberculosis and HIV/AIDS
Wim De Craene	40	September 14, 1990	Ghent, Belgium	Suicide by drug overdose
Rosa Balistreri Sicilian composer	63	September 20, 1990	Palermo, Italy	Stroke while in Calabria for a theatrical performance
Ray Stephens; Village People	35	October 4, 1990	Moreno Valley, California, U.S.	AIDS
Sam Taylor	74	October 5, 1990	Westchester, New York, U.S.	Unknown
D-Boy Rodriguez	22	October 6, 1990	Dallas, Texas, U.S.	Murdered
B.J. Wilson; Procol Harum	43	October 8, 1990	Corvallis, Oregon, U.S.	Drug overdose
Art Blakey	71	October 16, 1990	New York City, New York, U.S.	Lung cancer
Marie-France Dufour	41	October 18, 1990	Colombes, France	Leukemia
Arthur "Big Boy" Spires	78	October 22, 1990	Chicago, Illinois, U.S.	Unknown
Gervasio; Los Naúfragos	42	October 28, 1990	Talagante, Santiago Metropolitan Region, Chile	Either suicide by hanging or murder
Bobby Scott	53	November 5, 1990	New York City, New York, U.S.	Lung cancer
Ronnie Dyson	40	November 10, 1990	Brooklyn, New York, U.S.	Heart failure
Lester Williams	70	November 13, 1990	Houston, Texas, U.S.	Unknown
Orest Guran; The Chesterfield Kings	33	December 2, 1990	Rochester, New York, U.S.	Suicide by hanging
Dee Clark	52	December 7, 1990	Smyrna, Georgia, U.S.	Heart attack
Francisco Gabilondo Soler	83	December 14, 1990	Texcoco, Estado de México, Mexico	Cardiovascular disease
Goree Carter	59	December 29, 1990	Houston, Texas, U.S.	Unknown

== 1991 ==
Name	Age	Date	Location	Cause of death
Marius Brasiūnas; Manager for Bix	26	January, 1991	Around Joniškis, Lithuania	Car accident
Ada Rusowicz; Niebiesko-Czarni	46	January 1, 1991	Poznań, Poland	Car accident
Buck Ram	83	January 1, 1991	Las Vegas, Nevada, U.S.	Unknown
Renato Rascel	78	January 2, 1991	Rome, Italy	
Steve Clark; Def Leppard	30	January 8, 1991	London, England	Respiratory failure caused by a lethal alcohol and prescription drug overdose
Irwin Goodman	47	January 14, 1991	Hamina, Finland	Heart attack
Stan Szelest; The Band, Ronnie Hawkins	48	January 20, 1991	Woodstock, New York, U.S.	Heart attack
Karen Young	39	January 26, 1991	Philadelphia, Pennsylvania, U.S.	Possible peptic ulcer infection
Chris Schlosshardt; Bassist for Sea Hags	26	February 1, 1991	Manchester, Mendocino County, California, U.S.	Pneumonia
Roger Patterson; Atheist	22	February 12, 1991	Somewhere in Louisiana, U.S.	Traffic accident
George Motola; Record producer for Modern Records	71	February 15, 1991	Los Angeles, California, U.S.	Unknown
Bob Geddins; Record producer	78	February 16, 1991	Oakland, California, U.S.	Liver cancer
Webb Pierce	69	February 24, 1991	Nashville, Tennessee, U.S.	Pancreatic cancer
Slim Gaillard; Slim & Slam	75	February 26, 1991	London, England	Cancer
Frank Esler-Smith; Air Supply	42	March 1, 1991	Melbourne, Australia	Pneumonia from AIDS
Serge Gainsbourg	62	March 2, 1991	Paris, France	Heart attack
Doc Pomus	65	March 14, 1991	Manhattan, New York City, U.S.	Lung cancer
Chris Austin; Country singer and Fiddler/Guitarist for Ricky Skaggs and Reba McEntire's road bands	27	March 16, 1991	Otay Mountain, San Diego, California, U.S.	Plane crash
Joey Cigainero; Keyboardist for Reba McEntire's road band	27	March 16, 1991	Otay Mountain, San Diego, California, U.S.	Plane crash
Kirk Cappello; Musical director/Keyboardist for Reba McEntire's road band	28	March 16, 1991	Otay Mountain, San Diego, California, U.S.	Plane crash
Paula Kaye Evans; Back-up Singer for Reba McEntire's road band	33	March 16, 1991	Otay Mountain, San Diego, California, U.S.	Plane crash
Michael Thomas; Guitarist for Reba McEntire's road band	34	March 16, 1991	Otay Mountain, San Diego, California, U.S.	Plane crash
Terry Jackson; Bass Guitarist for Reba McEntire's road band	28	March 16, 1991	Otay Mountain, San Diego, California, U.S.	Plane crash
Tony Saputo; Drummer for Reba McEntire's road band	34	March 16, 1991	Otay Mountain, San Diego, California, U.S.	Plane crash
Jim Hammon; Road Manager for Reba McEntire's road band	40	March 16, 1991	Otay Mountain, San Diego, California, U.S.	Plane crash
Billy Butler	66	March 20, 1991	Teaneck, New Jersey, U.S.	Heart attack
Leo Fender	81	March 21, 1991	Fullerton, California, U.S.	Parkinson's disease
Dave Guard; The Kingston Trio	56	March 22, 1991	Rollinsford, New Hampshire, U.S.	Lymphatic cancer
Marc Connors; The Nylons	41	March 25, 1991	Toronto, Canada	HIV/AIDS
Paul Gayten	71	March 26, 1991	Los Angeles, California, U.S.	Unknown
Henry Glover	69	April 7, 1991	St. Albans, New York, U.S.	Heart attack
Per "Dead" Ohlin; Mayhem	22	April 8, 1991	Kråkstad, Akershus, Norway	Suicide by knife and gunshot
Marc Olsen; Keyboardist for Rare Earth	41	April 14, 1991	Orlando, Florida, U.S.	Liver disease; drug and alcohol abuse
Martin Hannett; Record producer for Joy Division, The Durutti Column, A Certain Ratio and Happy Mondays	42	April 18, 1991	Manchester, England	Heart failure
Steve Marriott; Small Faces, Humble Pie	44	April 21, 1991	Essex, England	Smoke inhalation from house fire
Johnny Thunders; The New York Dolls, The Heartbreakers	38	April 23, 1991	New Orleans, Louisiana, U.S.	Drug-related causes; suspicious
Gonzaguinha	45	April 29, 1991	Renascença, Paraná, Brazil	Car accident
Susan Fassbender	32	May 2, 1991	Bradford, England	Suicide
Harry Gibson	75	May 3, 1991	Brawley, California, U.S.	Suicide by gunshot
Andrew Tibbs	62	May 5, 1991	Chicago, Illinois, U.S.	Unknown
Yanka Dyagileva	24	May 9, 1991	Inya, Russian SSR, Soviet Union	Drowning; possible suicide
James Hopkins-Harrison; Lead singer for Lake	41	May 16, 1991	Hamburg, Germany	Heroin overdose
Odia Coates	49	May 19, 1991	Oakland Medical Center, Oakland, California, U.S.	Breast cancer
Will Sinnott; The Shamen	30	May 23, 1991	La Gomera, Spain	Drowned
Gene Clark; The Byrds	46	May 24, 1991	Sherman Oaks, California, U.S.	Bleeding ulcer due to alcoholism
David Ruffin; The Temptations	50	June 1, 1991	Philadelphia, Pennsylvania, U.S.	Cocaine overdose
MC Trouble	20	June 4, 1991	Los Angeles, California, U.S.	Heart failure after epileptic seizure
Stan Getz	64	June 6, 1991	Malibu, California, U.S.	Liver cancer
Heidi Brühl	49	June 8, 1991	Starnberg, Germany	Breast cancer
Richard Holmes	60	June 29, 1991	St. Louis, Missouri, U.S.	Prostate cancer
Michael Landon	54	July 1, 1991	Malibu, California, U.S.	Pancreatic and liver cancer
Willie Nix	68	July 8, 1991	Leland, Mississippi, U.S.	Unknown
Richard Nickens; The El Dorados	54	August 3, 1991	Chicago, Illinois, United States	Cancer
Alan Spenner; Bassist for Joe Cocker, Kenny Loggins, Lynda Carter, Peter Frampton, Ted Nugent, Roxy Music, etc.	43	August 11, 1991	London, England	Heart attack
Fadoul; Fadoul et Les Privilèges	49	August 14, 1991	Casablanca, Morocco	Unknown
Dootsie Williams; Record producer for The Penguins	80	August 21, 1991	Los Angeles, California, U.S.	Unknown
Mike Naumenko; Zoopark	36	August 27, 1991	Leningrad, Russian SFSR, Soviet Union	Cerebral hemorrhage
Vince Taylor; Singer for "The Playboys"	52	August 28, 1991	Lutry, Switzerland	Lung cancer
Dottie West	58	September 4, 1991	Nashville, Tennessee, U.S.	Ruptured liver from a car accident
Charlie Barnet	77	September 4, 1991	San Diego, California, U.S.	Pneumonia
Peter Slaghuis; VideoKids	30	September 5, 1991	Amsterdam, Netherlands	Traffic accident
Rob Tyner; MC5	46	September 18, 1991	Berkley, Michigan, U.S.	Heart attack
Tino Casal	41	September 22, 1991	Madrid, Spain	Car accident
Peter Bellamy; The Young Tradition	47	September 24, 1991	Keighley, England	Suicide
Anita Traversi	54	September 25, 1991	Bellinzona, Switzerland	Undisclosed causes
Billy Vaughn; The Hilltoppers	72	September 26, 1991	Escondido, California, U.S.	Peritoneal mesothelioma aka abdomen cancer
Miles Davis	65	September 28, 1991	Santa Monica, California, U.S.	Pneumonia, respiratory failure, and stroke
J. Frank Wilson; J. Frank Wilson and the Cavaliers	49	October 4, 1991	Lufkin, Texas, U.S.	Alcoholism and complications from diabetes
Igor Talkov	34	October 6, 1991	Saint Petersburg, Russian SFSR, Soviet Union	Shot to death
Bruno Rosettani; Italian singer and record producer	68	October 14, 1991	Civitanova Marche, Italy	Undisclosed
Ole Beich; Guns N' Roses	36	October 16, 1991	Copenhagen, Denmark	Drowning; possible suicide
Tennessee Ernie Ford	72	October 17, 1991	Reston, Virginia, U.S.	Liver failure
Bill Graham; Promoter of Various Bands	60	October 25, 1991	Vallejo, California, U.S.	Helicopter accident
Jim Reese; The Bobby Fuller Four	49	October 26, 1991	Lufkin, Texas, U.S.	Heart attack
Mort Shuman	54	November 2, 1991	London, England	Cancer
Chris Bender; American R&B singer	19	November 3, 1991	Brockton, Massachusetts, U.S.	Murder
Dave Rowbotham	33	November 8, 1991	Burnage, England	Murdered
Jacques Morali; Village People	44	November 15, 1991	Rouen, France	AIDS
Freddie Mercury; Queen	45	November 24, 1991	London, England	Complications due to AIDS
Eric Carr; Kiss	41	November 24, 1991	New York City, New York, U.S.	Cancer and brain hemorrhage
Buck Clayton	80	December 8, 1991	New York City, New York, U.S.	Natural causes
Headman Shabalala; Ladysmith Black Mambazo	46	December 10, 1991	KwaZulu-Natal, South Africa	Murdered
King Kolax	79	December 18, 1991	Chicago, Illinois, U.S.	Alzheimer's disease
Beaver Harris	55	December 22, 1991	New York City, New York, U.S.	Prostate cancer
Richard Blandon; The Dubs	57	December 30, 1991	New York, U.S.	Unknown

== 1992 ==
Name	Age	Date	Location	Cause of death
American Zulu; Member of The Soul Brothers	40	1992	Mayfair, Johannesburg, South Africa	Unknown
Johnny Rydh; Strebers	25	January 3, 1992	Stockholm, Sweden	Car crash
Teddy Grace	86	January 4, 1992	La Mirada, California, U.S.	Unknown
Steve Gilpin; Mi-Sex	42	January 6, 1992	Southport, Queensland, Australia	Car accident
Babette DeCastro; The DeCastro Sisters	66	January 10, 1992	Las Vegas, Nevada, U.S.	Cancer
Jerry Nolan; The New York Dolls, The Heartbreakers	45	January 14, 1992	New York City, New York, U.S.	Stroke
Dee Murray; Elton John, The Mirage, The Spencer Davis Group, Procol Harum, Alice Cooper, etc...	45	January 15, 1992	Nashville, Tennessee, U.S.	Melanoma and stroke
Charlie Ventura	75	January 17, 1992	Pleasantville, New Jersey, U.S.	Lung cancer
Champion Jack Dupree	81	January 21, 1992	Hanover, Germany	Cancer
Mitch McDowell; Booty People	37-38	January 21, 1992	San Bernardino, California, U.S.	Murdered
James "Thunderbird" Davis	53	January 23, 1992	Saint Paul, Minnesota, U.S.	Heart attack
Ken Darby	82	January 24, 1992	Sherman Oaks, California, U.S.	Heart problems
Clarence Dixon; The Four Knights	68	January 25, 1992	Inglewood, Los Angeles County, California, U.S.	Unknown
Willie Dixon	76	January 29, 1992	Burbank, California, U.S.	Leukemia
Laurel Lea	49	January 31, 1992	Camperdown, New South Wales, Australia	Leukemia
Jim Pepper	50	February 10, 1992	Portland, Oregon, U.S.	Lymphoma
Jane Pickens	84	February 21, 1992	Newport, Rhode Island, U.S.	Heart failure
Sudirman Arshad	37	February 22, 1992	Bangsar, Kuala Lumpur, Malaysia	Stroke
Larry Banks; The Four Fellows	60	February 26, 1992	Brooklyn, Kings County, New York, U.S.	Liver failure
Ron Hardy	33	March 2, 1992	Chicago, Illinois, U.S.	AIDS related
Mary Osborne	70	March 4, 1992	Bakersfield, California, U.S.	Chronic leukemia
Red Callender	76	March 8, 1992	Saugus, California, U.S.	Thyroid cancer
Monty Budwig	62	March 9, 1992	Eagle Rock, Los Angeles, California, U.S.	Liver cancer
Nancy Walker	69	March 25, 1992	Studio City, Los Angeles, California, U.S.	Lung cancer
Phillip Wilson; Paul Butterfield Blues Band	50	March 25, 1992	New York City, New York, U.S.	Murdered
Nigel Preston; The Cult, Death Cult, Theatre of Hate	28	April 1, 1992	London Borough of Lambeth, Greater London, England	Drug overdose
Walter Andreas Schwarz	78	April 1, 1992	Heidelberg, Germany	Unknown
Paula Kelly	72	April 2, 1992	Costa Mesa, California, U.S.	Unknown
Arthur Russell	40	April 4, 1992	New York, New York, U.S.	AIDS-related illnesses
Joe Medwick	60	April 12, 1992	Houston, Texas, U.S.	During a coughing fit
Eddie Fontaine	65	April 13, 1992	Roselle, New Jersey, U.S.	Throat cancer
Sammy Price	83	April 14, 1992	New York City, New York, U.S.	Heart attack
Andy Russell	72	April 16, 1992	Sun City, Arizona, U.S.	Complications from a stroke
Hank Penny	73	April 17, 1992	Somewhere in California, U.S.	Heart failure
Deacon Lunchbox	41	April 19, 1992	Near Greenville, Alabama, U.S.	Car crash
Robert Hayes; Bassist for The Jody Grind	24	April 19, 1992	Near Greenville, Alabama, U.S.	Car crash
Rob Clayton; Drummer for The Jody Grind	22	April 19, 1992	Near Greenville, Alabama, U.S.	Car crash
Frankie Howerd	75	April 19, 1992	Fulham, London, England	Heart failure
Benny Hill	68	April 20, 1992	Teddington, Greater London, England	Coronary thrombosis; kidney failure
Johnny Shines	76	April 20, 1992	Tuscaloosa, Alabama, U.S.	
Brian MacLeod; Chilliwack, Headpins	39	April 25, 1992	Vancouver, British Columbia, Canada	Brain & bone cancer
Yutaka Ozaki	26	April 25, 1992	Tokyo, Japan	Pulmonary edema; possible homicide
Sol K. Bright Sr.	82	April 27, 1992	Honolulu, Hawaii, U.S.	Unknown
Sharon Redd	46	May 1, 1992	Westchester County, New York, U.S.	AIDS-related pneumonia
Dudu Zulu; Juluka, Savuka	34	May 4, 1992	KwaZulu-Natal, South Africa	Murder
Jean-Claude Pascal	64	May 5, 1992	Clichy, Hauts-de-Seine, Paris, France	Stomach cancer
Marlene Dietrich	90	May 6, 1992	Paris, France	Renal/Kidney failure
Sylvia Syms	74	May 10, 1992	New York City, New York, U.S.	Heart attack
Dante Pergreffi; Bassist for I Nomadi	30	May 14, 1992	Near Correggio, Emilia-Romagna, Province of Reggio Emilia, Emilia-Romagna, Italy	Car crash
Barbara Lee; The Chiffons	44	May 15, 1992	New York City, New York, U.S.	Heart attack
Chalino Sánchez	31	May 16, 1992	Culiacán, Sinaloa, Mexico	Shot to death
Lawrence Welk	89	May 17, 1992	Santa Monica, California, U.S.	Pneumonia
Khalil Rountree; Tour manager for Boyz II Men	36	May 25, 1992	Chicago, Illinois, U.S.	Shot to death
Ollie Halsall; Tempest, Timebox, Patto, the Rutles, Boxer, Kevin Ayers, Vivian Stanshall, Cinemaspop	43	May 29, 1992	Madrid, Spain	Drug-induced heart attack
Iosu Expósito; Eskorbuto	31	May 31, 1992	Baracaldo, Spain	AIDS-related pneumonia
Willmer Broadnax	75	June 1, 1992	Philadelphia, Pennsylvania, United States	Stabbed to death
Geezil Minerve	70	June 4, 1992		Unknown
Antonio Bassano Sarri Italian singer	46	June 8, 1992	Casalpusterlengo, Italy	Suicide throwing himself under a train near Casalpusterlengo
Clarence Horatius Miller	69	June 9, 1992	Edmonton, Alberta, Canada	Heart attack
Nat Pierce	66	June 10, 1992	Los Angeles, California, U.S.	Complications from an abdominal infection
Pumpuang Duangjan	30	June 13, 1992	Phitsanulok, Thailand	Blood infection
Brenda Payton; Brenda & the Tabulations	46	June 14, 1992	Philadelphia, Pennsylvania, United States	Unknown
Dewey Balfa; The Balfa Brothers	65	June 17, 1992	Eunice, Louisiana, U.S.	Cancer
Earl Weatherford; The Weatherfords	69	June 17, 1992	Long Beach, California, U.S.	Unknown
Peter Allen	48	June 18, 1992	San Diego, California, U.S.	AIDS-related throat cancer
Charlie Ondras; Drummer for Unsane	25	June 22, 1992	New York City, New York, U.S.	Heroin overdose
Stefanie Sargent; 7 Year Bitch	24	June 27, 1992	Seattle, Washington, U.S.	Asphyxiation on her own vomit after taking alcohol and heroin
Luke McDaniel	65	June 27, 1992	Mobile, Alabama, U.S.	Unknown
Howard Roberts	62	June 28, 1992	Seattle, Washington, U.S.	Prostate cancer
Camarón de la Isla	41	July 2, 1992	Badalona, Barcelona, Spain	Lung cancer
Boogie Woogie Red	66	July 2, 1992	Detroit, Michigan, U.S.	Unknown
Joe Newman	69	July 4, 1992	New York City, New York, U.S.	Complications from a stroke
Alfonso Toncho Guerrero; Member of Toncho Pilatos	42	July 4, 1992	Guadalajara, Mexico	Unknown
Astor Piazzolla	71	July 4, 1992	Buenos Aires, Argentina	
Paul Hackman; Helix	38	July 5, 1992	Kamloops, British Columbia, Canada	Traffic accident
Herb Kenny; The Ink Spots	78	July 11, 1992	Columbia, Maryland, U.S.	Unknown
Gianni Magni	51	July 16, 1992	Milan, Italy	Heart attack
Steve Rye; Harmonica player for The Groundhogs	46	July 19, 1992	London, England	Alcohol-related causes
Gary Windo	50	July 25, 1992	New York City, New York, U.S.	Asthma attack
Alfred Drake	77	July 25, 1992	New York City, New York, U.S.	Heart failure after a long battle with cancer
Mary Wells	49	July 26, 1992	Los Angeles, California, U.S.	Pneumonia and throat cancer
Michel Berger	44	August 2, 1992	Ramatuelle, France	Heart attack
Jeff Porcaro; Toto	38	August 5, 1992	Los Angeles, California, U.S.	Heart attack due to cocaine use
Joe August	60	August 9, 1992	New Orleans, Louisiana, U.S.	Heart attack
Annisteen Allen	71	August 10, 1992	Harlem, New York City, New York, U.S.	Unknown/Heart attack
Tony Williams; The Platters	64	August 14, 1992	New York City, New York, U.S.	Emphysema
Jackie Edwards	54	August 15, 1992	Jamaica	Heart attack
Mark Heard	40	August 16, 1992	Chicago, Illinois, U.S.	Heart attack
Larrie Londin	48	August 24, 1992	Nashville, Tennessee, U.S.	Coma after suffering a myocardial infarction (aka heart attack)
Professor Eddie Lusk	43	August 26, 1992	Chicago River, Chicago, Illinois, U.S.	Suicide by jumping into the Chicago River
Émile Benoît	79	September 3, 1992	Stephenville, Newfoundland and Labrador, Canada	Unknown
Carl Butler; Carl Butler and Pearl	65	September 4, 1992	Franklin, Tennessee, U .S.	Heart attack
Hal Russell	66	September 5, 1992	La Grange, Illinois, U.S.	Heart attack
Dimitar Voev; Founder of New Generation	27	September 5, 1992	Sofia, Bulgaria	Cancer/Brain tumor
Anthony Perkins	60	September 12, 1992	Los Angeles, California, U.S.	AIDS-related pneumonia
Jimmie Nabbie; The 4 Tunes, The Ink Spots	72	September 15, 1992	Atlanta, Fulton, Georgia, U.S.	Died after double bypass heart surgery
Earl Van Dyke; The Funk Brothers	62	September 18, 1992	Detroit, Michigan, U.S.	Prostate cancer
Ivan Vdović; Limunovo drvo, Suncokret, Šarlo Akrobata, Katarina II, Ekatarina Velika, DDT	31	September 25, 1992	Belgrade, Serbia, FR Yugoslavia	HIV/AIDS
William "Bud" Joseph Cowsill, Sr. Manager of The Cowsills	66	September 29, 1992	Mexico	Leukemia
Harry Ray; Ray, Goodman & Brown	45	October 1, 1992	Bound Brook, Somerset, New Jersey, U.S.	Stroke
Eddie Kendricks; The Temptations	52	October 5, 1992	Birmingham, Alabama, U.S.	Lung cancer
Werner Wichtig	30	October 6, 1992	Unknown (likely Germany)	Heart attack
Augusto Daolio; Frontman and founding member of I Nomadi	45	October 7, 1992	Novellara, Italy	Lung cancer
Juanma Suárez; Eskorbuto	30	October 9, 1992	Santurtzi, Spain	Heart attack
Roger Miller	56	October 25, 1992	Los Angeles, California, U.S.	Lung and throat cancer
James Walker; The Dixie Hummingbirds	65	October 30, 1992	Philadelphia, Pennsylvania, U.S.	Unknown
Edward "Duke" Groner	84	November 7, 1992	Chicago, Illinois, U.S.	Unknown
Red Mitchell	65	November 8, 1992	Salem, Oregon, U.S.	Stroke
Larry Levan	38	November 8, 1992	Manhattan, New York City, U.S.	Heart failure from endocarditis
Sean Rowley; Vocalist and keyboardist for Cause and Effect	23	November 8, 1992	Minneapolis, Minnesota, U.S.	Heart failure brought on by a severe asthma attack
Oran "Doc" Guidry	72	November 10, 1992	Lafayette, Louisiana, U.S.	Unknown
Bobby McClure	50	November 13, 1992	Los Angeles, California, U.S.	Stroke
Ronnie Bond; The Troggs	52	November 13, 1992	Winchester, Hampshire, England	Undisclosed illness
George Adams	52	November 14, 1992	New York City, New York, U.S.	After an illness
Bobby Russell	52	November 19, 1992	Nicholasville, Kentucky, U.S.	Coronary artery disease
Ricky Williams; Crime, The Sleepers, Flipper, Toiling Midgets	36	November 21, 1992	El Camino, California, U.S.	Respiratory problems
Severino Gazzelloni Italian flautist		November 21, 1992	Cassino, Italy	End of a period of illness
Roy Acuff	89	November 23, 1992	Nashville, Tennessee, U.S.	Congestive heart failure
June Tyson; Sun Ra	56	November 24, 1992	Philadelphia, Pennsylvania, U.S.	Cancer
Wayne Bennett	59	November 28, 1992	New Orleans, Louisiana, U.S.	Heart failure
Wally Voss; Yngwie Malmsteen, Joey Tafolla	34	November 29, 1992	Fort Lauderdale, Florida, U.S.	Hodgkin lymphoma
Paul Ryan	44	November 29, 1992	London, England	Lung cancer
Franco Franchi; Italian actor, comedian, singer, and television host	64	December 9, 1992	Rome, Italy	Complications from a hemorrhage
Andy Kirk	94	December 11, 1992	New York City, New York, U.S.	Alzheimer's disease
Elbert Wilkins; The Dramatics	45	December 13, 1992	Marshall, Michigan, United States	Heart attack
Albert King	69	December 21, 1992	Memphis, Tennessee, U.S.	Heart attack
Eddie Hazel; Funkadelic	42	December 23, 1992	Brooklyn, New York, U.S.	Liver failure
Hank Mizell	69	December 23, 1992	Murfreesboro, Tennessee, U.S.	Unknown
Bobby LaKind; The Doobie Brothers	47	December 24, 1992	Los Angeles, California, U.S.	Colon cancer

== 1993 ==
Name	Age	Date	Location	Cause of death
Alessandra Maldifassi; Former child singer and soloist for Le Mele Verdi, famous for the theme song "Pat, la ragazza del baseball"	22	1993		Leukemia
Cooper Terry	44	1993	Antioch, California, U.S.	After a short illness
Dizzy Gillespie	75	January 6, 1993	Englewood, New Jersey, U.S.	Pancreatic cancer
Helno; Lucrate Milk	29	January 22, 1993	Paris, France	Heroin overdose
Thomas A. Dorsey	93	January 23, 1993	Chicago, Illinois, U.S.	Alzheimer's disease
Art Mooney	82	February 11, 1993	North Miami, Florida, U.S.	Lung disease
Patrick Waite; Musical Youth	24	February 18, 1993	Birmingham, England	Hereditary heart condition
Toy Caldwell; Marshall Tucker Band	45	February 25, 1993	Moore, South Carolina, U.S.	Cardio-respiratory failure from cocaine use
Marlena Davis; The Orlons	48	February 27, 1993	Philadelphia, Pennsylvania, United States	Lung cancer
Billy Eckstine	78	March 8, 1993	Pittsburgh, Pennsylvania, U.S.	Heart attack
Johnny Cymbal	48	March 16, 1993	Nashville, Tennessee, U.S.	Suspected heart attack
Jeff Ward; Nine Inch Nails, Skafish, Revolting Cocks, Ministry, Lard (Drums and Vocals), Low Pop Suicide, and "Hammeron"	30	March 19, 1993	Chicago, Illinois, United States	Suicide by carbon monoxide poisoning
Karen Dalton	55	March 19, 1993	Hurley, New York, U.S.	AIDS
Tony Harvey; Guitarist for "The Playboys"	52	March 23, 1993	London, England	Cancer
Jake Porter; Record producer and co-founder of Combo Records	76	March 25, 1993	Los Angeles, California, U.S.	Unknown
Oscar Carboni; Italian singer	78	March 29, 1993	Ferrara, Italy	Heart attack
Eugene Church	55	April 3, 1993	Los Angeles, California, U.S.	Cancer
Concetta Barra; Italian singer and actress	71	April 4, 1993	Naples, Italy	Pneumonia
Marian Anderson; Groundbreaking African-American soprano	96	April 8, 1993	Portland, Oregon, U.S.	Congestive heart failure
Igor Chumychkin; Alisa	27	April 12, 1993	Moscow, Russia	Suicide by falling out a window
Lebert Lombardo; Younger brother of Guy Lombardo	88	April 17, 1993	Sanibel, Florida, U.S.	Unknown
DJ Subroc; KMD, Constipated Monkeys	19	April 23, 1993	NY 878, Nassau County, New York, U.S.	Hit by a car
Mick Ronson; David Bowie, Mott the Hoople, The Spiders from Mars	46	April 30, 1993	London, England	Liver cancer
Louis Brooks	82	May 5, 1993	Nashville, Tennessee, U.S.	Unknown
Marv Johnson	54	May 16, 1993	Columbia, South Carolina, U.S.	Stroke
Tony Del Monaco	57	May 27, 1993	Ancona, Italy	Unknown/An "incurable disease"
Doctor Ross	67	May 28, 1993	Flint, Michigan, U.S.	Unknown
Sun Ra	79	May 30, 1993	Birmingham, Alabama, U.S.	Pneumonia
Dupree Bolton	64	June 5, 1993	Oakland, California, U.S.	Cardiac arrest
Conway Twitty	59	June 5, 1993	Springfield, Missouri, U.S.	Abdominal aortic aneurysm
Arthur Alexander	53	June 9, 1993	Nashville, Tennessee, U.S.	Heart attack
Jimmy Weston; Lead singer for The Danleers	52	June 10, 1993	New York City, New York, U.S.	Unknown
John Campbell	41	June 13, 1993	New York City, New York, U.S.	Heart failure
Luther Tucker	57	June 18, 1993	Greenbrae, California, U.S.	Heart attack
GG Allin; The Jabbers, The Scumfucs, The Murder Junkies	36	June 28, 1993	New York City, New York, U.S.	Heroin overdose
Héctor Lavoe	46	June 29, 1993	Manhattan, New York, U.S.	HIV/AIDS
Wong Ka Kui; Beyond	31	June 30, 1993	Tokyo, Japan	Internal bleeding due to head injuries
Dave Rubinstein; Reagan Youth	28	July 3, 1993	New York City, New York, U.S.	Suicide by anti-depressant overdose
Mia Zapata; The Gits	27	July 7, 1993	Seattle, Washington, U.S.	Murder by strangulation
Boston Blackie	49	July 11, 1993	Chicago, Illinois, U.S.	Murder by gunshot
Richard Tee	49	July 21, 1993	The Bronx, New York, U.S.	Prostate cancer
Bobby Peterson; The McCoys	47	July 21, 1993	Gainesville, Florida, U.S.	Unknown
Michael Wulf; Kreator, Sodom	29	July 21, 1993	Berlin,Germany	Motorcycle accident
Eddie Guzman; Rare Earth	49	July 29, 1993	Howell, Michigan, U.S.	Complications from diabetes
Don Myrick; Earth, Wind & Fire	53	July 30, 1993	Los Angeles, California, U.S.	Murder by gunshot
Rob "The Bass Thing" Jones; The Wonder Stuff	29	July 31, 1993	New York City, New York, U.S.	Heart failure from drug abuse
Randy Jo Hobbs; Bassist for The McCoys, Montrose, Johnny Winter	45	August 5, 1993	Dayton, Ohio, U.S.	Heart failure from drug abuse
Euronymous; Mayhem	25	August 10, 1993	Oslo, Norway	Murdered by Varg Vikernes
Johnny Sayles	56	August 17, 1993	Hazel Crest, Illinois, U.S.	Heart attack
Phil Seymour; Dwight Twilley	41	August 17, 1993	Los Angeles, California, U.S.	Lymphoma
Daisy Lumini	57	August 18, 1993	Barberino di Mugello, Tuscany, Italy	Suicide
René Klijn	30	September 5, 1993	The Hague, Netherlands	Complications of AIDS
Lefty Dizz	56	September 7, 1993	Chicago, Illinois, U.S.	Esophageal cancer
Helen O'Connell	73	September 9, 1993	San Diego, California, U.S.	Cancer
Erich Leinsdorf Austrian-American conductor	81	September 11, 1993	Zurich, Switzerland	Cancer
Ian Stuart Donaldson; English neo-Nazi musician	36	September 24, 1993	Derbyshire, England	Car crash
Wade Flemons; Earth, Wind & Fire	53	October 13, 1993	Battle Creek, Michigan, U.S.	Cancer
Peppino Russo Italian poet, lyricist and composer		October 16, 1993	Naples, Italy	
Criss Oliva; Savatage	30	October 17, 1993	Zephyrhills, Florida, U.S.	Traffic accident
Howie Blauvelt; Ram Jam	44	October 25, 1993	United States	Heart attack
Vincent Price; Actor, voice of the monologue in Michael Jackson's song Thriller	82	October 25, 1993	Los Angeles, California, U.S.	Lung cancer
River Phoenix; Aleka's Attic	23	October 31, 1993	West Hollywood, California, U.S.	Speedball overdose
Albert Collins	61	November 24, 1993	Las Vegas, Nevada, U.S.	Lung cancer
Jerry Edmonton; Steppenwolf	47	November 28, 1993	Santa Barbara, California, U.S.	Traffic accident
Camillo Togni Italian composer and pianist		November 28, 1993	Brescia, Italy	Cardiovascular collapse
David Houston	57	November 30, 1993	Bossier City, Louisiana, U.S.	Brain aneurysm
Ray Gillen; Black Sabbath, Badlands, Sun Red Sun, Phenomena, Blue Murder, Bobby Rondinelli	34	December 1, 1993	New York City, New York, U.S.	AIDS-related disease
Frank Zappa; The Mothers of Invention	52	December 4, 1993	Los Angeles, California, U.S.	Prostate cancer
Doug Hopkins; Gin Blossoms	32	December 5, 1993	Tempe, Arizona, U.S.	Suicide by gunshot
Charizma	20	December 16, 1993	Milpitas, California, U.S.	Shot to death
Michael Clarke; The Byrds, The Flying Burrito Brothers	47	December 19, 1993	Treasure Island, Florida, U.S.	Liver failure
Eric "Bingy Bunny" Lamont; The Morwells, Roots Radics	38	December 31, 1993	Spanish Town, Jamaica	Prostate cancer

== 1994 ==
Name	Age	Date	Location	Cause of death
Billy Windsor; Guitarist for Danny Gatton	49	January 5, 1994	Washington, D.C., U.S	Heart attack
Harold Lucas; The Clovers	61	January 6, 1994	Washington, D.C., U.S.	Lung cancer
Cora Marie; South African Folk singer	40	January 8, 1994	Pretoria, South Africa	Cancer
Silas Hogan	82	January 9, 1994	Baton Rouge, Louisiana, U.S.	Heart disease
Luciano Beretta; Italian lyricist and singer	66	January 11, 1994	Caprino Veronese, Italy	Heart attack
Harry Nilsson	52	January 15, 1994	Agoura Hills, California, U.S.	Heart failure
Victor Lombardo; Youngest brother of Guy Lombardo	82	January 22, 1994	Boca Raton, Florida, U.S.	Unknown
Rhett Forrester; Riot	37	January 22, 1994	Atlanta, Georgia, U.S.	Murdered
John Littlejohn	62	February 1, 1994	Chicago, Illinois, U.S.	Renal failure
John Bailey; The Clovers	63	February 3, 1994	Las Vegas, Nevada, U.S.	Unknown
Raymond Scott American jazz composer and musician	85	February 8, 1994	Los Angeles, California, United States	Pneumonia
Gary B.B. Coleman	47	February 14, 1994	Center, Texas, U.S.	Unknown
Papa John Creach; Jefferson Airplane, Jefferson Starship, The Dinosaurs	76	February 22, 1994	Los Angeles, California, U.S.	Congestive heart failure
Dinah Shore	77	February 24, 1994	Beverly Hills, California, U.S.	Ovarian cancer
Adam Jackson; The Jesters	55	February 27, 1994	Harlem, New York City, United States	Unknown
Melina Mercouri; Greek actress and singer	73	March 6, 1994	Manhattan, New York City, U.S	Lung cancer
Ephraim Lewis	25	March 18, 1994	Los Angeles, California, U.S.	Fell from balcony after being tased by police
Dan Hartman	43	March 22, 1994	Westport, Connecticut, U.S.	AIDS-related brain tumor
Ginny Simms	80	April 4, 1994	Palm Springs, California, U.S.	Heart attack
Kurt Cobain; Nirvana	27	April 5, 1994	Seattle, Washington, U.S.	Suicide by gunshot
Paola Tovaglia Italian television host, voice actress and singer	28	April 6, 1994	Milan, Italy	Brain tumor
Lee Brilleaux; Dr. Feelgood	51	April 7, 1994	Canvey Island, Essex, England	Lymphoma
Ken Carson	79	April 7, 1994	Delray Beach, Florida, U.S.	Lou Gehrig's disease
Larry Davis	57	April 19, 1994	Los Angeles, California, U.S	Cancer
Haskell Sadler	59	May 6, 1994	Berkeley, California, U.S.	Complications from diabetes
Alessandro Bono	29	May 15, 1994	Milan, Italy	AIDS
Jimmy Fernandez; The God Machine	28	May 23, 1994	London, England	Brain hemorrhage
Joe Pass	65	May 23, 1994	Los Angeles, California, U.S.	Liver cancer
Eric Gale	55	May 25, 1994	Baja California Peninsula, Mexico	Lung cancer
Derek Leckenby; Herman's Hermits	51	June 4, 1994	Manchester, England	Non-Hodgkin lymphoma
Henry Mancini	70	June 14, 1994	Los Angeles, California, U.S.	Pancreatic cancer
Kristen Pfaff; Hole, Janitor Joe	27	June 16, 1994	Seattle, Washington, U.S.	Heroin overdose
Kin Vassy; Kenny Rogers and the First Edition	50	June 23, 1994	Nashville, Tennessee, United States	Lung cancer
Debra "Dame" Hurd; Damian Dame	35	June 27, 1994	Atlanta, Georgia, U.S.	Car crash
Beachy Thompson; The Dixie Hummingbirds	78	June 28, 1994	Philadelphia, Pennsylvania, United States	
Obadiah Carter; The Five Royales	69	June 30, 1994	Winston-Salem, Forsyth, North Carolina, U.S.	Unknown
Eddie Boyd	79	July 13, 1994	Helsinki, Finland	Natural causes
Chuck Valle; Original bassist for Ludichrist	28	July 17, 1994	Los Angeles, California, United States	Stabbed to death
Gary Farr; Gary Farr & The T-Bones	49	July 29, 1994	Los Angeles, California, U.S.	Arteriosclerotic cardiovascular disease
Ryszard Riedel; Dżem	37	July 30, 1994	Chorzów, Katowice Voivodeship, Poland	Cardiac insufficiency due to drug abuse
Domenico Modugno	66	August 6, 1994	Lampedusa, Italy	Heart attack
Ugo Calise; Italian singer and composer	73	August 6, 1994	Rome, Italy	Unknown
Bill Baker; The Five Satins	57	August 10, 1994	New Haven, New Haven County, Connecticut, U.S.	Stroke/Lung cancer
Jessie Boilan; The Artistics	57	August 24, 1994	Chicago, Illinois, U.S.	Unknown
Creadel "Red" Jones; The Chi-Lites	53	August 25, 1994	Glendale, California, U.S.	Died homeless/Cause unknown
Major Lance	55	September 3, 1994	Decatur, Georgia, U.S.	Heart disease
Louis Myers; The Aces	64	September 5, 1994	Chicago, Illinois, United States	Unknown
Nicky Hopkins; The Jeff Beck Group, The Rolling Stones	50	September 6, 1994	Nashville, Tennessee, U.S.	Complications from intestinal surgery/Crohn's disease
Major Bill Smith; Record producer and record label owner	72	September 12, 1994	Fort Worth, Texas, U.S.	Unknown
Haywood Henry	81	September 15, 1994	The Bronx, New York City, U.S.	Unknown
Jimmy Hamilton	77	September 20, 1994	St. Croix, Virgin Islands	Heart failure
Ken Montgomery; The Four Horsemen	36	September 27, 1994	Vancouver, Canada	Heroin overdose
Pierre Isacsson; Family Four	46	September 28, 1994	Baltic Sea, between Stockholm, Sweden and Tallinn, Estonia	Died in the sinking of the MS Estonia
Urmas Alender; Ruja, Propeller	40	September 28, 1994	Baltic Sea, between Stockholm, Sweden and Tallinn, Estonia	Died in the sinking of the MS Estonia
Cheb Hasni	26	September 29, 1994	Oran, Algeria	Murder by gunshot
Danny Gatton	49	October 4, 1994	Newburg, Maryland, U.S.	Suicide by gunshot
Nini Rosso; Italian trumpeter and singer	68	October 5, 1994	Rome, Italy	Lung cancer
Lee Allen	67	October 18, 1994	Los Angeles, California, U.S.	Lung cancer
Jimmy Miller; Record producer for Blind Faith, Spooky Tooth, Motörhead, Primal Scream, and association with The Rolling Stones	52	October 22, 1994	Denver, Colorado, U.S.	Liver failure
Wilbert Harrison	65	October 26, 1994	Spencer, North Carolina, U.S.	Stroke
Robert White; The Funk Brothers	57	October 27, 1994	Los Angeles, California, U.S.	Complications from open heart surgery
Lester Sill; Record producer from Phil Spector's partner in Philles Records	76	October 31, 1994	Los Angeles, California, U.S.	Unknown
Fred "Sonic" Smith; MC5, Sonic's Rendezvous Band	46	November 4, 1994	Detroit, Michigan, U.S.	Heart failure
Milan Mladenović; Šarlo Akrobata, Katarina II / Ekatarina Velika	36	November 5, 1994	Belgrade, Serbia, FR Yugoslavia	Pancreatic cancer
Carmen McRae	72	November 10, 1994	Beverly Hills, California, U.S.	Stroke
Louis Hendrik Potgieter Dschinghis Khan	43	November 12, 1994	Port Elizabeth, Eastern Cape, South Africa	AIDS-related complications
Patrick Esposito Di Napoli; Les Colocs	30	November 13, 1994	Montreal, Quebec, Canada	AIDS complications
Chet Powers; Quicksilver Messenger Service	57	November 16, 1994	Santa Rosa, California, U.S.	Complications during brain surgery
Tommy McManus; Mama's Boys	28	November 16, 1994	London, England	Leukemia
Cab Calloway	86	November 18, 1994	Hockessin, Delaware, U.S.	Stroke
Tommy Boyce; Boyce and Hart	55	November 23, 1994	Nashville, Tennessee, U.S.	Suicide by gunshot
Connie Kay; Modern Jazz Quartet	67	November 30, 1994	New York City, New York, U.S.	Cardiac arrest
Garnett Silk	28	December 9, 1994	Mandeville, Jamaica	House fire
Robert Mersey	77	December 14, 1994	Baltimore, Maryland, U.S.	Unknown
Carlos Rigual Rodríguez; Los Hermanos Rigual	74	December 17, 1994	Mexico	Undisclosed
Dan Hamilton; Hamilton, Joe Frank & Reynolds	48	December 23, 1994	Los Angeles, California, U.S.	Cushing's syndrome/Stroke
Eugene Daughtry; The Intruders	55	December 25, 1994	Philadelphia, Pennsylvania, United States	Cancer
Buddy Ace	58	December 26, 1994	Waco, Texas, U.S.	Heart attack
Eugene Tanner; The Five Royales	58	December 29, 1994	Wiston-Salem, Forsyth County, North Carolina, U.S.	Unknown

== 1995 ==
Name	Age	Date	Location	Cause of death
Mark Kreider; Tycoon	46	January, 1995	New York City, U.S.	HIV/Tuberculosis
Ted Hawkins	58	January 1, 1995	Los Angeles, California, U.S.	Stroke
Jess Stacy	90	January 1, 1995	Los Angeles, California, U.S.	Heart failure
Johnny Carroll	57	January 13, 1995	Dallas, Texas, U.S.	Liver failure
Ruby Starr; Black Oak Arkansas	45	January 14, 1995	Toledo, Ohio, U.S.	Lung cancer
Chris Baldo	51	January 24, 1995	Luxembourg City, Luxembourg	Unknown (possibly natural causes)
David Cole; Record producer for C+C Music Factory	32	January 24, 1995	New York City, New York, U.S.	Complications from spinal meningitis, possibly from AIDS
Richey Edwards; Manic Street Preachers	27	February 1, 1995	Cardiff, Wales, U.K.	Declared dead in absentia (possible suicide)
Art Taylor	65	February 6, 1995	Manhattan, New York, New York, U.S.	Unknown
Billy Jones; Outlaws	45	February 7, 1995	Spring Hill, Florida, U.S.	Suicide by gunshot
Earring George Mayweather	67	February 12, 1995	Boston, Massachusetts, United States	Liver cancer
Tony Secunda; Manager of The Moody Blues, Procol Harum, Motörhead, Steeleye Span, The Move and T-Rex	54	February 12, 1995	Tiburon, California, U.S.	Heart attack
Philip Taylor Kramer; Iron Butterfly	42	February 12, 1995	Los Angeles County, U.S./Ventura County, California, U.S.	Murder or suicide
Denny Cordell; Record producer for The Hollies, The Moody Blues, The Move	51	February 18, 1995	Dublin, Ireland	Lymphoma
Bob Stinson; The Replacements, Static Taxi	35	February 18, 1995	Minneapolis, Minnesota, U.S.	Organ failure from drug abuse
Melvin Franklin; The Temptations	52	February 23, 1995	Sherman Oaks, California, U.S.	Complications from a seizure
Willie Johnson	71	February 25, 1995	Chicago, Illinois, U.S.	Unknown
Frank O'Keefe; Outlaws	44	February 26, 1995	Clearwater, Pinellas Country, Florida, U.S.	Drug overdose
Mercury Nelson; Force MDs	29	March 3, 1995	Staten Island, New York City, U.S.	Heart attack
Vivian Stanshall; Bonzo Dog Doo-Dah Band	51	March 5, 1995	Muswell Hill, London, England	House fire
Delroy Wilson	46	March 6, 1995	Kingston, Jamaica	Cirrhosis of the liver
Ingo Schwichtenberg; Helloween	29	March 8, 1995	Hamburg, West Germany	Suicide by jumping in front of a subway train
Teresa Teng	42	March 8, 1995	Baozhong, Yunlin, Taiwan	Unknown (possibly heart complications)
Sunnyland Slim	88	March 17, 1995	Chicago, Illinois, U.S.	Renal failure
Nike Ardilla	19	March 19, 1995	Bandung, Indonesia	Traffic accident
Alan Barton; Smokie, Black Lace	41	March 23, 1995	Cologne, Germany	Traffic accident
Ripley Ingram; The Five Keys	65	March 23, 1995	Newport News, Virginia, U.S.	Unknown
Eazy-E; N.W.A	30	March 26, 1995	Compton, California, U.S.	Complications due to AIDS
Jimmy McShane; Baltimora	37	March 29, 1995	Derry, Northern Ireland	Complications due to AIDS
Ricardo Ceratto	55	March 29, 1995	Santa Fe City, Argentina	Cardiac arrest
Roland Wolf; Nick Cave and the Bad Seeds	30	March 29, 1995	Germany	Car crash
Paul A. Rothchild; Record producer for The Doors & The Paul Butterfield Blues Band	59	March 30, 1995	Hollywood, California, U.S.	Lung cancer
Selena; Selena y Los Dinos	23	March 31, 1995	Corpus Christi, Texas, U.S.	Shot by Yolanda Saldívar
Burl Ives	85	April 14, 1995	Anacortes, Washington, U.S.	Oral cancer
Sam Brown; The Intruders	56	April 21, 1995	Strawberry Mansion Bridge, Fairmount Park, Philadelphia, Pennsylvania, U.S.	Suicide by jumping off bridge
Carl Albert; Vicious Rumors	32	April 22, 1995	Oakland, Alameda California, U.S.	Traffic accident
Don Pullen	53	April 22, 1995	East Orange, New Jersey, U.S.	Lymphoma
Lonesome Sundown	66	April 23, 1995	Gonzales, Louisiana, U.S.	Complications from stroke
Clarence Paul; The Five Royales, Stevie Wonder	67	May 6, 1995	Los Angeles, California, U.S.	Complications of heart disease and diabetes
Ray McKinley	84	May 7, 1995	Largo, Florida, U.S.	Unknown
Marshal Royal	82	May 9, 1995	Culver City, California, U.S.	Cancer
Jimmy Raney	67	May 10, 1995	Louisville, Kentucky, U.S.	Heart failure
Mia Martini	47	May 12, 1995	Cardano al Campo, Varese, Italy	Cardiac arrest caused by drug overdose
Sims Ellison; Pariah	28	June 6, 1995	Austin, Texas, U.S.	Suicide by gunshot
Rodel Naval	42	June 11, 1995	Toronto, Ontario, Canada	Complications related to AIDS
Rory Gallagher	47	June 14, 1995	London, England	MRSA complications following a liver transplant/Liver failure/Alcohol abuse
Petri Walli; Kingston Wall	26	June 28, 1995	Töölö, Helsinki, Finland	Suicide
Phyllis Hyman	45	June 30, 1995	New York City, New York, U.S.	Suicide by intentional barbiturate overdose
Wolfman Jack; American DJ	57	July 1, 1995	Belvidere, North Carolina, U.S.	Heart attack
Sean Mayes; Pianist for David Bowie	50	July 12, 1995	London, England	HIV/AIDS
Jimmy Keyes; The Chords	65	July 22, 1995	New York City, U.S.	Aneurysm during surgery
Jerry Lordan; Songwriter	61	July 24, 1995	Shrewsbury, Shropshire, England	Acute renal failure
Charlie Rich	62	July 25, 1995	Hammond, Louisiana, U.S.	Pulmonary embolism
Eddie Hinton	51	July 28, 1995	Birmingham, Alabama, U.S.	Heart attack
Jerry Garcia; The Grateful Dead, New Riders of the Purple Sage	53	August 9, 1995	Forest Knolls, California, U.S.	Heart attack
Damon Edge; Chrome	45	August 11, 1995	Redondo Beach, California, U.S.	Unknown
Allan McCarthy; Keyboardist for Men Without Hats	37	August 11, 1995	Montreal, Quebec, Canada	HIV / AIDS
Phil Harris	91	August 11, 1995	Rancho Mirage, California, U.S.	Heart attack
Achille Togliani Italian singer and actor	71	August 12, 1995	Rome, Italy	Heart attack
Bobby DeBarge; DeBarge, Switch	39	August 16, 1995	Grand Rapids, Michigan, U.S.	HIV/AIDS
Wild Bill Davis	76	August 17, 1995	Moorestown Township, New Jersey, U.S.	Unknown
John Gilmore	63	August 20, 1995	Philadelphia, Pennsylvania, U.S.	Emphysema
Red Rhodes	64	August 20, 1995	Los Angeles, California, U.S.	Interstitial lung fibrosis
Dwayne Goettel; Skinny Puppy	31	August 23, 1995	Edmonton, Alberta, Canada	Heroin overdose
Gary Crosby	62	August 24, 1995	Burbank, California, U.S.	Lung cancer
Doug Stegmeyer; Billy Joel, Debbie Gibson, Hall & Oates, "Topper"	43	August 25, 1995	Smithtown, New York, U.S.	Suicide by gunshot
Ronald White; Smokey Robinson & The Miracles	56	August 26, 1995	Detroit, Michigan, U.S.	Leukemia
Big Dee Irwin	63	August 27, 1995	Las Vegas, New York, U.S.	Heart failure
Sterling Morrison; The Velvet Underground, Nico	53	August 30, 1995	Poughkeepsie, New York, U.S.	Non-Hodgkin's lymphoma
Salil Chowdhury	71	September 5, 1995	Calcutta, West Bengal, India	Unknown
John "Jack" Vigliatura; For Squirrels	21	September 5, 1995	Interstate 95 just south of Savannah, Georgia, U.S.	Car crash
Bill White; For Squirrels	23	September 5, 1995	Interstate 95 just south of Savannah, Georgia, U.S.	Car crash
Timothy C. Bender; Road manager of For Squirrels	23	September 5, 1995	Interstate 95 just south of Savannah, Georgia, U.S.	Car crash
Larry Gales	59	September 12, 1995	Sylmar, Los Angeles, California, U.S.	Leukemia
Daniel Montesanto; Fashion Police, Defiance, Sinister	29	September 21, 1995	California, United States	Murder or stabbing
Dolly Collins	62	September 22, 1995	Balcombe, West Sussex, England	Unknown
Booker T. Laury	81	September 25, 1995	Memphis, Tennessee, U.S.	Cancer
Allen Johnson; The Marcels	55	September 28, 1995	Pittsburgh, Allegheny, Pennsylvania, U.S.	Cancer
Marcel King; Lead singer for Sweet Sensation	38	October 5, 1995	Manchester, England	Brain hemorrhage
Bryan Johnson	69	October 18, 1995	Unknown (likely England)	Cancer
Don Cherry	58	October 19, 1995	Málaga,Spain	Liver cancer
Shannon Hoon; Blind Melon	28	October 21, 1995	New Orleans, Louisiana, U.S.	Cocaine overdose
Maxene Andrews; The Andrews Sisters	79	October 21, 1995	Cape Cod, Massachusetts, U.S.	Heart attack
Florence Greenberg; Music executive and record producer	82	November 2, 1995	Hackensack, New Jersey, U.S.	Heart failure
Country Dick Montana; The Beat Farmers	40	November 8, 1995	Whistler, British Columbia, Canada	Brain aneurysm while performing
Kenneth S. Goldstein; Folklorist and record producer	68	November 11, 1995	Philadelphia, Pennsylvania, U.S.	Unknown
Jackson (Jax) Miller; Static Lung	21	November 14, 1995	Portland, Oregon, U.S.	Heroin overdose/Suicide
Alan Hull; Lindisfarne	50	November 17, 1995	Newcastle, England	Heart thrombosis
Kim Sung-jae Deux	23	November 20, 1995	Seoul, South Korea	Accidental drug overdose
Matthew Ashman; Bow Wow Wow, Adam and the Ants	35	November 21, 1995	London, England	Diabetes
Peter Grant; Music manager from Stone the Crows, The Yardbirds, Led Zeppelin, Bad Company and record executive from Swan Song Records	60	November 21, 1995	Eastbourne, Sussex, England	Heart attack
Tom Clay; American radio personality and disc jockey	66	November 22, 1995	Los Angeles, California, U.S.	Stomach and lung cancer
Junior Walker; Junior Walker & the All Stars	64	November 23, 1995	Battle Creek, Michigan, U.S.	Cancer
David Briggs; Record producer for Crazy Horse	51	November 26, 1995	San Francisco, California, U.S.	Lung cancer
Stretch	27	November 30, 1995	Queens Village, Queens, New York, U.S.	Shot to death
Busta Jones	44	December 6, 1995	Memphis, Tennessee, U.S.	Heart failure
Darren Robinson; The Fat Boys	28	December 10, 1995	Rosedale, Queens, New York, U.S.	Heart attack
Nancy LaMott	43	December 13, 1995	New York City, New York, U.S.	Uterine cancer
Billy Horton; The Silhouettes	65	December 23, 1995	Philadelphia, Pennsylvania, U.S.	Unknown
Dean Martin	78	December 25, 1995	Beverly Hills, California, U.S.	Acute respiratory failure stemming from emphysema and lung cancer
Maxwell Street Jimmy Davis	70	December 28, 1995	Chicago, Illinois, U.S.	Heart attack
Clarence Satchell; Ohio Players	55	December 30, 1995	Dayton, Ohio, U.S.	Brain aneurysm

== 1996 ==
Name	Age	Date	Location	Cause of death
Natxo Etxebarrieta; Cicatriz	32	January 5, 1996	Vitoria-Gasteiz, País Vasco, Spain	Complications due to AIDS
Kim Kwang-seok	31	January 6, 1996	Seoul, South Korea	Suicide
Les Baxter	73	January 15, 1996	Newport Beach, California, U.S.	Heart attack
Richard Kermode; Janis Joplin, Santana	49	January 16, 1996	Denver, Colorado, U.S.	Undisclosed illness
Buster Benton	63	January 20, 1996	Chicago, Illinois, U.S.	Complications due to diabetes
Gerry Mulligan	68	January 20, 1996	Darien, Connecticut, U.S.	Complications following knee surgery
Frankie Garcia; Cannibal & the Headhunters	49	January 21, 1996	Los Angeles, California, U.S.	AIDS-related illness
Edem Ephraim; London Boys	36	January 21, 1996	Eastern Alps, Austria	Car crash caused by a drunk driver
Dennis Fuller; London Boys	36	January 21, 1996	Eastern Alps, Austria	Car crash caused by a drunk driver
Jonathan Larson; Composer and lyricist of Rent and Tick, Tick... Boom!	35	January 25, 1996	New York City, New York, U.S.	Aortic dissection
Stevie Plunder; The Plunderers, The Whitlams	32	January 25, 1996	Wentworth Falls, Australia	Suicide
Bob Thiele	73	January 30, 1996	Manhattan, New York City, New York, U.S.	Kidney failure
Gene Kelly	83	February 2, 1996	Beverly Hills, California, U.S.	Stroke
Wild Jimmy Spruill	61	February 3, 1996	Washington D.C., U.S.	Heart attack
Brownie McGhee	80	February 16, 1996	Oakland, California, U.S.	Stomach cancer
Birgit Brüel	68	February 23, 1996	Gentofte, Denmark	Undisclosed causes
Wes Farrell; Record producer, Songwriter	56	February 29, 1996	Coconut Grove, Florida, U.S.	Cancer
Alecsander "Dinho" Alves; Lead singer for Mamonas Assassinas	24	March 2, 1996	Cantareira mountain range, near São Paulo, Brazil	Plane crash
Alberto "Bento" Hinoto; Guitarist for Mamonas Assassinas	25	March 2, 1996	Cantareira mountain range, near São Paulo, Brazil	Plane crash
Samuel Reis de Oliveira (Samuel Reoli); Bass guitarist for Mamonas Assassinas	22	March 2, 1996	Cantareira mountain range, near São Paulo, Brazil	Plane crash
Júlio Cesar Barbosa (Júlio Rasec); Keyboardist/Backing vocalist for Mamonas Assassinas	28	March 2, 1996	Cantareira mountain range, near São Paulo, Brazil	Plane crash
Sérgio Reis de Oliveira (Sérgio Reoli); Drummer for Mamonas Assassinas	26	March 2, 1996	Cantareira mountain range, near São Paulo, Brazil	Plane crash
Minnie Pearl	83	March 4, 1996	Nashville, Tennessee, U.S.	Stroke
George Burns	100	March 9, 1996	Beverly Hills, California, U.S.	Cardiac arrest
Joseph Page; The Tams	76	March 16, 1996	Decatur, DeKalb, Georgia, U.S.	Heart failure
Terry Stafford	54	March 17, 1996	Amarillo, Texas, U.S.	Liver failure
Billy Williamson; Bill Haley & His Comets	71	March 22, 1996	Swarthmore, Pennsylvania, U.S.	Cancer
Don Murray; The Turtles	50	March 22, 1996	Glendale, California, U.S.	Complications following ulcer surgery
J. D. "Jay" Miller; Record producer, Songwriter	73	March 23, 1996	Lafayette, Louisiana, U.S.	Complications from quadruple bypass surgery
Jeffrey Lee Pierce; The Gun Club	37	March 31, 1996	Salt Lake City, Utah, U.S.	Cerebral hemorrhage
Guitar Gabriel	70	April 2, 1996	Winston-Salem, North Carolina, U.S.	Unknown
Magaly Gilles; Sophie and Magaly	33	April 2, 1996	Toulon, France	Complications of AIDS
Gaylord Birch; Drummer for Santana, Graham Central Station, Cold Blood, Pointer Sisters, Herbie Hancock	50	April 14, 1996	San Francisco, California, U.S.	Cancer
Raymond Hill	62	April 16, 1996	Clarksdale, Mississippi, U.S.	Congestive heart failure
Bernard Edwards; Chic	43	April 18, 1996	Tokyo, Japan	Pneumonia
Mike Leander; Record producer, Songwriter	54	April 18, 1996	London, England, U.K.	Cancer
Beatmaster V Body Count	37	April 30, 1996	Los Angeles, California, United States	Leukemia
Jean-Claude Corbel; Profil (groupe)	43	April 30, 1996	Marly-le-Roi, Yvelines, France	Asthma attack
Patsy Montana	87	May 3, 1996	San Jacinto, Riverside, California, U.S.	Heart Failure
Wally Nightingale	40	May 6, 1996	London, England, U.K.	Drug-related illness
Patricia Maessen; Hearts of Soul, Dream Express	44	May 15, 1996	Mortsel, Belgium	Complications from a stroke
Johnny "Guitar" Watson	61	May 18, 1996	Yokohama, Japan	Heart attack
Kevin Gilbert	29	May 18, 1996	Los Angeles, California, U.S.	Accidental strangulation
Bradley Nowell; Sublime	28	May 25, 1996	San Francisco, California, U.S.	Heroin overdose
Jimmy Rowles	77	May 28, 1996	Burbank, California, U.S.	Cardiac arrest
John Kahn; Jerry Garcia Band, Legion of Mary, Old & In the Way	48	May 30, 1996	Mill Valley, California, U.S.	Heart attack
Don Grolnick	48	June 1, 1996	Manhattan, New York, U.S.	Non-Hodgkin lymphoma
Giorgio Caldana Singer, member of the vocal group Poker di Voci	66	June 2, 1996	Turin, Italy	
Kenny Hillery; Bassist for Quiet Riot	31	June 5, 1996	California, U.S.	Suicide
Alan Blakley; The Tremeloes	54	June 10, 1996	London, England, U.K.	Cancer
Ella Fitzgerald	79	June 15, 1996	Beverly Hills, California, U.S.	Stroke
Gino Bramieri Italian comedian, actor, cabaret artist, humorist, television host, singer, and radio host	67	June 18, 1996	Milan, Italy	
Jim Ellison; Material Issue	32	June 20, 1996	Chicago, Illinois, U.S.	Suicide by carbon monoxide poisoning
Bruce "Damian" Broadus; Damian Dame	29	June 27, 1996	Atlanta, Georgia, United States	Colon cancer
Sergey Kuryokhin; Aquarium	42	July 9, 1996	St. Petersburg, Russia	Heart condition
Louis Gottlieb; The Limeliters	72	July 11, 1996	Sebastopol, California, U.S.	Died after a short illness
Jonathan Melvoin; The Smashing Pumpkins	34	July 12, 1996	New York City, New York, U.S.	Heroin and alcohol overdose
Keith Whittaker; Lead singer for The Demics	44	July 16, 1996	Toronto, Ontario, Canada	Cancer
John Panozzo; Styx	47	July 16, 1996	Chicago, Illinois, U.S.	Gastrointestinal hemorrhage/Cirrhosis
Chas Chandler; The Animals	57	July 17, 1996	Heaton, Newcastle upon Tyne, England	Aortic aneurysm
Marcel Dadi	44	July 17, 1996	Long Island, New York, U.S.	TWA Flight 800
Inger Jacobsen	72	July 21, 1996	Oslo, Norway	Cancer
Rob Collins; The Charlatans	33	July 22, 1996	Near Monmouth, Wales	Traffic accident
Marge Ganser; The Shangri-Las	48	July 28, 1996	Bronx, New York, U.S.	Breast cancer
Gaio Chiocchio Italian composer, guitarist and singer-songwriter, founder of Cranium and collaborator of artists such as Edoardo Bennato and Gianna Nannini	42	July 28, 1996	Rome, Italy	
Jason Thirsk; Pennywise, Humble Gods	28	July 29, 1996	Hermosa Beach, California, U.S.	Suicide by gunshot
Seagram	26	July 31, 1996	Oakland, California, U.S.	Shot to death
Frida Boccara	55	August 1, 1996	Paris, France	Pulmonary infection
Luciano Tajoli Italian singer and actor	76	August 3, 1996	Merate, Lecco, Italy	
Roger Rogerson; Original bassist for Circle Jerks	41	August 8, 1996	Los Angeles, California, U.S	Drug overdose
Mel Taylor; The Ventures	62	August 11, 1996	Los Angeles, California, U.S.	Lung cancer
Al Cleveland	66	August 14, 1996	Las Vegas, Nevada, U.S.	Heart disease
Joe Seneca	77	August 15, 1996	New York City, New York, U.S.	Asthma
Ray Brown; Lead singer for Ray Brown & the Whispers	51	August 17, 1996	Sydney, Australia	Heart attack
Rio Reiser; Ton Steine Scherben	46	August 20, 1996	Fresenhagen, Germany	Internal bleeding
Alyce King; The King Sisters	81	August 23, 1996	Los Angeles, California, U.S.	Respiratory failure
Bill Monroe	84	September 9, 1996	Springfield, Tennessee, U.S	Unknown
Tupac Shakur; Outlawz	25	September 13, 1996	Las Vegas, Nevada, U.S.	Murder
Jessie Hill	63	September 17, 1996	New Orleans, Louisiana, U.S	Heart and renal failure
Bob Gibson	64	September 28, 1996	Portland, Oregon, U.S.	Degenerative brain disease
Ronnie Garvin; Lead guitarist for "Stranger"	37	October 7, 1996	Safety Harbor, Florida, United States	Suicide by gunshot
Colleen Peterson; Quartette	45	October 9, 1996	Toronto, Ontario, Canada	Cancer
Renato Russo Legião Urbana	36	October 11, 1996	Rio de Janeiro, Brazil	Complications caused by AIDS
G-Slimm	21	October 13, 1996	New Orleans, Louisiana, U.S.	Shot to death
Chris Acland; Lush	30	October 17, 1996	Burneside, South Lakeland, Cumbria, England	Suicide by hanging
Eva Cassidy	33	November 2, 1996	Bowie, Maryland, U.S.	Melanoma
William Clarke	45	November 2, 1996	Fresno, California, U.S.	Unknown
Eddie Harris	62	November 5, 1996	Los Angeles, California, U.S.	Congestive heart failure
Yaki Kadafi; Outlawz	19	November 10, 1996	Orange, New Jersey, U.S.	Shot to death
Bill Doggett	80	November 13, 1996	New York City, New York, U.S.	Heart attack
Art Porter Jr.	35	November 23, 1996	Sai Yok, Thailand	Drowning
Secondina "Dina" Fasano Member of the Duo Fasano		November 24, 1996	Turin, Italy	
Tiny Tim	64	November 30, 1996	Minneapolis, Minnesota, U.S.	Heart attack
Annamaria Baratta Italian singer	46	December 5, 1996	Rome, Italy	
Patty Donahue; The Waitresses	40	December 9, 1996	Cleveland, Ohio, U.S.	Lung cancer
Faron Young	64	December 10, 1996	Nashville, Tennessee, U.S.	Suicide
Dawn Crosby; Detente, Fear of God	33	December 15, 1996	Annapolis, Maryland, U.S.	Liver failure
Ruby Murray	61	December 17, 1996	Torquay, Devon, England	Liver cancer
Ronnie Scott	69	December 23, 1996	London, England	Accidental barbiturate overdose
Johnny Heartsman	60	December 27, 1996	Sacramento, California, U.S.	Stroke
Jerry Knight; Raydio, Ollie & Jerry	44	December 29, 1996	Los Angeles, California, U.S.	Cancer

== 1997 ==
Name	Age	Date	Location	Cause of death
Ivan Graziani Italian singer-songwriter and guitarist	51	January 1, 1997	Novafeltria, Italy	Heart attack
Townes Van Zandt	52	January 1, 1997	Smyrna, Tennessee, U.S.	Cardiac arrhythmia
Hagood Hardy	59	January 1, 1997	Hamilton, Ontario, Canada	Lymphoma
Randy California; Spirit	45	January 2, 1997	Molokai, Hawaii, U.S.	Drowned
Alexander Young; Marcus Hook Roll Band, AC/DC	58	January 4, 1997	Hamburg, Germany	Lung cancer
Kenny Pickett; The Creation	56	January 10, 1997	London, England	Heart attack
Isa Di Marzio Italian actress, voice actress, and singer	67	January 10, 1997	Rome, Italy	
Alvinio Misciano Italian tenor	81	January 10, 1997	Milan, Italy	
Keith Diamond	46	January 18, 1997	Manhattan, New York, U.S.	Heart attack
Ron Holden	57	January 22, 1997	Rosarito Beach, Baja California, Mexico	Heart attack
Billy Mackenzie; Associates	39	January 22, 1997	Angus, Scotland	Suicide by barbiturate overdose
Audie Pitre Acid Bath	26	January 23, 1997	Bourg, Terrebonne Parish, Louisiana, U.S.	Car accident
Richard Berry	61	January 23, 1997	Inglewood, California, U.S.	Heart failure
Seth Lover	87	January 31, 1997	Garden Grove, California, U.S.	Died after a brief illness
Chico Science	30	February 2, 1997	Recife, Brazil	
Bill Cheatham; The Stooges	48	February 3, 1997	Ann Arbor, Michigan, United States	Unknown
Robert "Big Mojo" Elem	69	February 5, 1997	Chicago, Illinois, U.S.	Unknown
Brian Connolly; The Sweet	52	February 9, 1997	Slough, Berkshire, England	Liver failure from alcohol abuse
Jack Owens	92	February 9, 1997	Yazoo City, Mississippi, U.S.	Unknown
Tony Williams; Drummer for Miles Davis, The Tony Williams Lifetime, Sam Rivers, Jackie McLean, Alan Dawson, V.S.O.P., Public Image Ltd.	51	February 23, 1997	Daly City, California, U.S.	Heart attack
Martin Smith; Gentle Giant, Simon Dupree and the Big Sound	50	March 2, 1997	Unknown	Internal hemorrhaging
Raymond Edwards; The Silhouettes	74	March 4, 1997	Philadelphia, Pennsylvania, U.S.	Unknown
Ralph Bass; Record producer from Black & White Records, Savoy Records, King Records, Federal Records, and Chess Records	85	March 5, 1997	New York City, New York, U.S.	Unknown
Bobby Chouinard; Drummer for Billy Squier	43	March 8, 1997	New York City, New York, U.S.	Heart attack
The Notorious B.I.G.	24	March 9, 1997	Los Angeles, California, U.S.	Shot see murder of the Notorious B.I.G.
LaVern Baker	67	March 10, 1997	Queens, New York, U.S.	Cardiovascular disease
Boris Büchner; Bassist for Cucumber Men	23	March 11, 1997	Uetersen, Schleswig-Holstein, Germany	Suicide as the result of suffering from Crohn's disease
Jermaine Stewart	39	March 17, 1997	Homewood, Illinois, U.S.	AIDS-related liver cancer
Ronnie Barron; Canned Heat, Paul Butterfield Blues Band	53	March 20, 1997	Los Angeles, California, United States	Heart failure
Marino Marini Italian singer and pianist		March 20, 1997	Milan, Italy	
Harold Melvin; Harold Melvin & the Blue Notes	57	March 24, 1997	Philadelphia, Pennsylvania, United States	Stroke
Kenny Moore; Keyboardist for Tina Turner and Aretha Franklin	45	March 24, 1997	Sydney, City of Sydney, New South Wales, Australia	Cerebral hemorrhage/Stroke
Aaron Collins; The Cadets	66	March 27, 1997	Los Angeles, California, United States	Unknown
Laura Nyro	49	April 8, 1997	Danbury, Connecticut, U.S.	Ovarian cancer
Yank Rachell	94	April 9, 1997	Indianapolis, Indiana, U.S	Unknown
Jay Hening; Guitarist for Demolition 23 and "Star Star"	32	April 18, 1997	United States	Suicide by gunshot
Dan "Cernunnos" Vandeplas; Drummer for Enthroned	25	April 19, 1997	Belgium	Suicide by hanging
Eldon Hoke; Mentors, The Screamers	39	April 19, 1997	Riverside, California, U.S.	Rail accident
Gene Ames; Ames Brothers	74	April 26, 1997	Scottsdale, Arizona, U.S.	Cancer
John Steele; The Willows	60	April 28, 1997	New York City, United States	Undisclosed illness
Keith Ferguson; The Fabulous Thunderbirds	50	April 29, 1997	Austin, Texas, U.S.	Liver failure
Ernie Fields	92	May 1, 1997	Tulsa, Oklahoma, U.S.	Natural causes
David Christie	49	May 11, 1997	Capbreton, France	Suicide
Fiorenzo Carpi Italian composer and pianist, probably best known for the "Pinocchio" theme	78	May 21, 1997	Rome, Italy	
Lovie Lee	88	May 23, 1997	Chicago, Illinois, U.S.	Unknown
Jeff Buckley	30	May 29, 1997	Memphis, Tennessee, U.S.	Accidental drowning
West Arkeen; Songwriter	36	May 30, 1997	Los Angeles, California, U.S.	Accidental opiate overdose
Ronnie Lane; The Small Faces, Faces	51	June 4, 1997	Trinidad, Colorado, U.S.	Pneumonia/Multiple sclerosis
Joe Johansen; The Adventurers	55	June 4, 1997	Spokane, Washington, D.C.	Heart attack
Johnny "Hammond" Smith	63	June 4, 1997	Victorville, California, U.S.	Cancer
Arthur Prysock	73	June 14, 1997	Hamilton, Bermuda	Illness from an aneurysm
John Wolters; Drummer for Dr.Hook	51	June 16, 1997	San Francisco, California, United States	Liver cancer
Bobby Helms	63	June 19, 1997	Martinsville, Indiana, U.S.	Emphysema
Lawrence Payton; The Four Tops	59	June 20, 1997	Southfield, Michigan, U.S.	Liver cancer
Ted Gärdestad	41	June 22, 1997	Sollentuna, Sweden	Suicide by train
Louis A. McCall Sr. Con Funk Shun	45	June 25, 1997	Stone Mountain, Georgia, U.S.	Murder
Israel Kamakawiwo'ole	38	June 26, 1997	Honolulu, Hawaii, U.S.	Heart & respiratory failure
Robert Mitchum	79	July 1, 1997	Santa Barbara, California, U.S.	Lung cancer & emphysema
Johnny Copeland	60	July 3, 1997	Harlem, New York, U.S.	Complications from heart surgery
Mrs. Miller	89	July 5, 1997	Vista, California, U.S.	Natural causes
Howard Pickup; The Adverts	47	July 11, 1997	London, City of London, Greater London, England	Brain tumor
Frank Farrell; Supertramp	50	July 19, 1997	London, England, U.K.	Unknown
Bob Gaddy	73	July 24, 1997	The Bronx, New York, U.S.	Lung cancer
Chuck Wayne	74	July 29, 1997	Jackson, New Jersey, U.S.	Emphysema
Fela Kuti	58	August 2, 1997	Lagos, Nigeria	Complications from AIDS (disputed)
Luise King; The King Sisters	83	August 4, 1997	Sandy City, Salt Lake, Utah, U.S.	Cancer
Luther Allison	57	August 12, 1997	Madison, Wisconsin, U.S.	Metastasis
Gulshan Kumar Bhajan singer, music and film producer of T-Series	41	August 12, 1997	Mumbai, Maharashtra, India	Murder by gunshot
Nusrat Fateh Ali Khan	48	August 16, 1997	London, England	Cardiac arrest
Roy Huskey Jr. Bassist for Emmylou Harris, John Hartford, Chet Atkins, Garth Brooks, Johnny Cash, Vince Gill, George Jones, Steve Earle, Doc Watson, Del Wood, Roy Acuff	40	September 6, 1997	Nashville, Tennessee, U.S.	Lung cancer
Jimmy Witherspoon	77	September 18, 1997	Los Angeles, California, U.S.	Throat cancer
Nick Traina; Link 80	19	September 20, 1997	Pleasant Hill, Contra Costa, California, U.S.	Suicide by self-administered lithium overdose
Larry Hall	57	September 24, 1997	Somewhere in Oregon, U.S.	Cancer
Phil Medley	81	October 3, 1997	New York City, U.S.	Unknown
John Denver; The John Denver Band	53	October 12, 1997	Pacific Grove, California, U.S.	Experimental plane accident
Glen Buxton; Alice Cooper	49	October 19, 1997	Clarion, Iowa, U.S.	Pneumonia
Henry Vestine; Canned Heat	52	October 20, 1997	Paris, France	Heart and respiratory failure
Anton LaVey	67	October 29, 1997	San Francisco, California, U.S.	Pulmonary edema
Quique Villanueva Los Náufragos	55	November 4, 1997	Buenos Aires, Argentina	Esophageal cancer
Epic Soundtracks; Swell Maps, Crime & the City Solution, These Immortal Souls	38	November 6, 1997	West Hampstead, London, England	Inconclusive official cause
Tommy Tedesco	67	November 10, 1997	Northridge, California, U.S.	Lung cancer
Ralph Middlebrooks; Trumpeter for Ohio Players	57	November 15, 1997	Dayton, Montgomery County, Ohio, U.S.	Cancer
Michael Hutchence; INXS	37	November 22, 1997	Sydney, Australia	Suicide or accidental strangulation
Fenton Robinson	62	November 25, 1997	Rockford, Illinois, U.S.	Complications from brain cancer
Michael Hedges	43	December 2, 1997	Mendocino County, California, U.S.	Traffic accident
Glen Morrow; Keyboardist for Chris de Burgh	50	December 5, 1997	Toronto, Ontario, Canada.	Lymphoma
Kurt Winter; The Guess Who	51	December 14, 1997	Winnipeg, Manitoba, Canada	Liver failure
Nicolette Larson	45	December 16, 1997	Los Angeles, California, U.S.	Cerebral edema and liver failure
Jimmy Rogers	73	December 19, 1997	Chicago, Illinois, U.S.	Colon cancer
Amie Comeaux	21	December 21, 1997	Lacombe, Louisiana, U.S.	Car crash
Jackie Landry Jackson; The Chantels	56	December 23, 1997	The Bronx, New York, U.S.	Breast cancer
Floyd Cramer	64	December 31, 1997	Nashville, Tennessee, U.S.	Lung cancer

== 1998 ==
Name	Age	Date	Location	Cause of death
Nick Venet; Record producer and association with The Beach Boys	61	January 2, 1998	Eastside Los Angeles, U.S.	Burkitt's lymphoma
John Gary	65	January 4, 1998	Dallas, Texas, U.S.	Prostate cancer
Sonny Bono; Sonny & Cher	62	January 5, 1998	South Lake Tahoe, California, U.S.	Skiing accident
Ken Forssi; The Surfaris, Love	54	January 10, 1998	Tallahassee, Florida, U.S.	Brain tumor
Phyllis Nelson	47	January 12, 1998	Los Angeles, California, U.S.	Breast cancer
Bob Martin	75	January 13, 1998	Vienna, Austria	Unknown
Junior Wells; The Aces	63	January 15, 1998	Chicago, Illinois, U.S.	Lymphoma
Junior Kimbrough	67	January 17, 1998	Holly Springs, Mississippi, U.S.	Heart attack following a stroke
Antoine "T.C.D." Lundy; Force MDs	34	January 18, 1998	East Stroudsburg, Pennsylvania, U.S.	ALS
Carl Perkins	65	January 19, 1998	Jackson, Tennessee, U.S.	Throat cancer
Johnny Funches; The Dells	62	January 23, 1998	Illinois, United States	Pneumonia
Walter Bishop Jr.	70	January 24, 1998	New York City, New York, U.S.	Heart attack
Attila Zoller	70	January 25, 1998	Townshend, Vermont, U.S.	Unknown
Lee Moses	56	January 26, 1998	Atlanta, Georgia, U.S	Lung cancer
Fat Pat; Screwed Up Click	27	February 3, 1998	Houston, Texas, U.S.	Murder by gunshot
Tim Kelly; Slaughter	35	February 5, 1998	Bagdad, Arizona, U.S.	Traffic accident
Joe Stubbs; The Falcons, The Contours, The Originals	55	February 5, 1998	Detroit, Michigan, United States	Heart problems
Carl Wilson; The Beach Boys	51	February 6, 1998	Los Angeles, California, U.S.	Lung cancer
Falco	40	February 6, 1998	Puerto Plata, Dominican Republic	Traffic accident involving a bus
Fleming Williams; The Hues Corporation	54	February 15, 1998 (disputed)	Unknown	Suicide (semi-disputed)
Bob Merrill; Songwriter, theatrical composer, lyricist, and screenwriter	76	February 17, 1998	Culver City, California, U.S.	Suicide
Grandpa Jones	84	February 19, 1998	Nashville, Tennessee, U.S.	Stroke
Bob McBride; Lighthouse	51	February 20, 1998	Toronto, Ontario, Canada	Heart failure
Marie Adams	72	February 23, 1998	Houston, Texas, U.S.	Unknown
Rockin' Sidney	59	February 25, 1998	Lake Charles, Louisiana, U.S.	Throat cancer
Roger Christian; The Christians	48	March 8, 1998	Liverpool, England	Brain tumour
Stephen McNally; Roadmaster	47	March 12, 1998	Kokomo, Indiana, U.S.	Pancreatic cancer
Judge Dread	52	March 13, 1998	Canterbury, Kent, England U.K.	Heart attack
Dave Lewis	59	March 13, 1998	San Diego, California, U.S.	Cancer
Darcy Clay	25	March 15, 1998	Grey Lynn, Auckland, New Zealand	Suicide
George Howard	41	March 20, 1998	Atlanta, Georgia, U.S.	Colon cancer
Michèle Arnaud	79	March 30, 1998	Maisons-Laffitte, France	Unknown
Rozz Williams; Christian Death, Shadow Project, Premature Ejaculation	34	April 1, 1998	West Hollywood, California, U.S.	Suicide by hanging
Rob Pilatus; Milli Vanilli	32	April 2, 1998	Frankfurt, Germany	Alcohol and prescription pill overdose
Alvin Tyler	72	April 2, 1998	New Orleans, Louisiana, U.S.	Unknown
Cor van der Beek; Drummer for Shocking Blue	49	April 2, 1998	Rotterdam, Netherlands	Undisclosed illness
Cozy Powell; The Jeff Beck Group, Rainbow, Whitesnake, Black Sabbath	50	April 5, 1998	Bristol, England	Traffic accident
Wendy O. Williams; Plasmatics	48	April 6, 1998	Storrs, Connecticut, U.S.	Suicide by gunshot
Tammy Wynette	55	April 6, 1998	Nashville, Tennessee, U.S.	Heart failure with cardiac arrhythmia
Carlos Vega; James Taylor	41	April 7, 1998	Los Angeles, California, U.S.	Suicide by gunshot
Tom Cora	44	April 9, 1998	Draguignan, France	Malignant melanoma
Lillian Briggs	65	April 11, 1998	Miami, Florida, U.S.	Lung cancer
Linda McCartney; Paul McCartney & Wings	56	April 17, 1998	Tucson, Arizona, U.S.	Breast cancer
Curly Chalker	66	April 30, 1998	Hendersonville, Tennessee, U.S.	Brain tumor
hide X Japan, Zilch	33	May 2, 1998	Tokyo, Japan	Suicide by hanging
Syd Lawrence	74	May 5, 1998	Manchester, England	Aneurysm
Eddie Rabbitt	56	May 7, 1998	Nashville, Tennessee, U.S.	Lung cancer
Frank Sinatra	82	May 14, 1998	West Hollywood, California, U.S.	Heart attack
Rudy West; The Five Keys	65	May 14, 1998	Chesapeake, Virginia, U.S.	Heart attack
Dorothy Donegan	76	May 19, 1998	Los Angeles, California, U.S.	Colon cancer
Ted Dunbar	61	May 29, 1998	New Brunswick, New Jersey, U.S.	Stroke
Helen Carter; Carter Family, The Carter Sisters	70	June 2, 1998	Nashville, Tennessee, U.S.	Heart failure
Jack Bedient; Jack Bedient & The Chessmen	60	June 4, 1998	Redondo Beach, California, U.S.	Unknown
Jerry Capehart	69	June 7, 1998	Nashville, Tennessee, U.S.	Brain cancer
Wally Gold; The Four Esquires	70	June 7, 1998	Teaneck, New Jersey, U.S.	Colitis
Steve Sanders; The Oak Ridge Boys	45	June 10, 1998	Cape Coral, Florida, U.S.	Suicide by gunshot
Rocco Torrebruno Italian singer	61	June 12, 1998	Madrid, Spain	
Lew Chudd; Record producer, radio executive and co-founder of Imperial Records	86	June 15, 1998	Los Angeles, California, U.S.	Unknown
Jarosław Pruszkowski; Sixteen		June 17, 1998	Slovakia	Heart attack
Billie Hughes; Record producer, songwriter	50	July 3, 1998	Los Angeles, California, U.S.	Heart attack
Roy Rogers	86	July 6, 1998	Apple Valley, California, U.S.	Congestive heart failure
Aldo Stellita; Matia Bazar	50	July 9, 1998	Udine, Italy	Lung cancer
Marc Hunter; Dragon	44	July 17, 1998	Berry, New South Wales, Australia	Throat cancer
Tom Calandra; Raven, Stan and the Ravens	56	July 19, 1998	Buffalo, New York, U.S.	Illness
Dave "Chico" Ryan; Sha Na Na	50	July 26, 1998	Boston, Massachusetts, U.S.	Heart failure
Nino Ferrer	63	August 13, 1998	Saint-Cyprien, Lot, France	Suicide by gunshot
Raquel Rastenni	82	August 17, 1998	Skodsborg, Sjælland, Denmark	Natural causes
Gene Page	58	August 24, 1998	Westwood, California, U.S.	Alcohol poisoning/Long-term illness
Denniz Pop; DJ music producer	35	August 30, 1998	Solna, Sweden	Stomach cancer
Igor Sorin; Ivanushki International	28	September 4, 1998	Moscow, Russia	Suicide
Sonny Knight	64	September 5, 1998	Maui, Hawaii, U.S.	Unknown/Stroke
Lucio Battisti	55	September 9, 1998	Milan, Italy	
Johnny Adams	66	September 14, 1998	Baton Rouge, Louisiana, U.S.	Cancer
Barrett Deems; Jimmy Dorsey, Louis Armstrong, Red Norvo, and Muggsy Spanier	84	September 15, 1998	Chicago, Illinois, U.S.	Pneumonia
Charlie Foxx; Inez and Charlie Foxx	58	September 18, 1998	Mobile, Alabama, U.S.	Leukemia
Oz Bach; Spanky and Our Gang	59	September 21, 1998	Asheville, North Carolina, U.S.	Cancer
Jeff Moss; Longtime composer, songwriter, and scriptwriter for Sesame Street	56	September 25, 1998	Manhattan, New York City, New York, U.S.	Colorectal cancer
Betty Carter	69	September 26, 1998	Brooklyn, New York, U.S.	Pancreatic cancer
Pauline Julien	70	October 1, 1998	Montreal, Quebec, Canada	Suicide
Gene Autry	91	October 2, 1998	Studio City, California, U.S.	Lymphoma
Bojan Pečar; VIA Talas, Ekatarina Velika	38	October 13, 1998	London, England	Heart attack
David Proch; The Skyliners	44	October 19, 1998	Near Ligonier, Pennsylvania, U.S.	Car crash
Vivienne McAuliffe; Affinity	50	October 21, 1998	London, United Kingdom	Unknown
Warren Wiebe; Vocalist and session musician who worked with David Foster, Jay Graydon, Celine Dion, and Quincy Jones	45	October 25, 1998	Glendale, California, U.S.	Suicide
Lonnie Pitchford	43	November 8, 1998	Lexington, Mississippi, U.S.	HIV/AIDS
Kenny Kirkland	43	November 12, 1998	Queens, New York City, U.S.	Congestive heart failure
Eldridge Holmes	56	November 13, 1998	Louisiana, New Orleans, United States	Unknown
Hal Davis; Record producer, songwriter	65	November 18, 1998	Los Angeles, California, U.S.	Unknown
Barbara Acklin	55	November 27, 1998	Omaha, Nebraska, U.S.	Pneumonia
George Van Eps	85	November 29, 1998	Newport Beach, California, U.S.	Pneumonia
Jake Carey; The Flamingos	70	December 10, 1998	Lanham, Maryland, United States	Heart attack
Lynn Strait; Snot	30	December 11, 1998	Santa Barbara, California, U.S.	Traffic accident
Jimmy "Orion" Ellis	53	December 12, 1998	Selma, Alabama, U.S.	Murdered
Bryan Maclean; Love	52	December 25, 1998	Los Angeles, California, U.S.	Heart attack
Johnny Moore; The Drifters	64	December 30, 1998	London, England	Respiratory failure

== 1999 ==
Name	Age	Date	Location	Cause of death
Michael Weber; Seminal Rats	32	January 2, 1999	Melbourne, Australia	Heroin overdose
Johnny D'Arc; The Four Lads	60	January 4, 1999	Riverside, California, U.S.	Heart attack
Sonny Forriest; The Coasters	64	January 10, 1999	Capitol Heights, Maryland, U.S.	Unknown
Barry Prichard; The Fortunes	54	January 11, 1999	Swindon, Wiltshire, South West England	Heart attack
Fabrizio De André	58	January 11, 1999	Milan, Italy	Lung cancer
John Baker Saunders; Mad Season; The Walkabouts	44	January 15, 1999	Seattle, Washington, U.S.	Heroin overdose
William "Bill" E. Albaugh; The Lemon Pipers	53	January 20, 1999	Batesville, Ripley, Indiana, U.S.	Undisclosed cause
Charles Brown	76	January 21, 1999	Oakland, California, U.S.	Congestive heart failure
Benjamin Smoke; Smoke	39	January 29, 1999	Atlanta, Georgia, U.S.	Liver failure due to hepatitis C
Barış Manço	56	February 1, 1999	Kadıköy, Istanbul, Turkey	Heart attack
David McComb; The Triffids, Blackeyed Susans	36	February 2, 1999	Melbourne, Victoria, Australia	Heroin toxicity and rejection of his 1996 heart transplant
Gwen Guthrie	48	February 3, 1999	Orange, New Jersey, U.S.	Uterine cancer
Mutsumi "623" Fukuhara; Vocalist for Super Junky Monkey	27	February 5, 1999	Osaka, Japan	Suicide by falling
Bobby Troup	80	February 7, 1999	Los Angeles, California, U.S.	Heart attack
Jaki Byard	76	February 11, 1999	New York City, New York, U.S.	Shot to death
Gerald Gregory; The Spaniels	64	February 12, 1999	Gary, Lake, Indiana, U.S.	Brain tumor
Buddy Knox	65	February 14, 1999	Bremerton, Washington, U.S.	Lung cancer
Big L	24	February 15, 1999	New York City, New York, U.S.	Murdered
Björn Afzelius; Hoola Bandoola Band	52	February 16, 1999	Gothenburg, Sweden	Lung cancer
Vann "Piano Man" Walls	80	February 24, 1999	Montreal, Canada, U.S.	Cancer
Sławomir "Sławek" Onacik; Lessdress	37	February 27, 1999	Warsaw, Poland	Unknown
David Ackles	62	March 2, 1999	Tujunga, Los Angeles, California, U.S.	Lung cancer
Dusty Springfield; The Springfields	59	March 2, 1999	Henley-on-Thames, Oxfordshire, England	Breast cancer
Jackson C. Frank	56	March 3, 1999	Great Barrington, Massachusetts, U.S.	Combination of pneumonia and cardiac arrest
Buddy Trenier; The Treniers	85	March 5, 1999	Las Vegas, Nevada, United States	Lung cancer
Lowell Fulson	77	March 7, 1999	Long Beach, California, U.S.	Complications from kidney disease, diabetes, and congestive heart failure
Marv Ingram; The Four Preps	60	March 7, 1999	Shreveport, Louisiana	Heart attack
Gregg Diamond	49	March 14, 1999	U.S.	Gastrointestinal bleeding
Peppermint Harris	73	March 19, 1999	Elizabeth, New Jersey, U.S.	Unknown
Val Valentin; Record producer and record engineer	79	March 24, 1999	Reno, Nevada, U.S.	Unknown
Mighty Joe Young	71	March 24, 1999	Chicago, Illinois, U.S.	Pneumonia
Freaky Tah; Lost Boyz	27	March 28, 1999	Queens, New York, U.S.	Murdered by gunshot
Joe Williams	80	March 29, 1999	Las Vegas, Nevada, U.S.	Natural causes
Jesse Stone	97	April 1, 1999	Altamonte Springs, Florida, U.S.	Pneumonia
Joe Cassano Italian rapper	25	April 3, 1999	Bologna, Italy	
Red Norvo	91	April 6, 1999	Santa Monica, California, U.S	
Colin Manley; The Remo Four	56	April 9, 1999	Old Swan, Liverpool, Lancashire	Cancer
Skip Spence; Jefferson Airplane, Moby Grape	52	April 16, 1999	Santa Cruz, California, U.S.	Lung cancer
Melba Liston	73	April 23, 1999	Los Angeles, California, U.S.	Stroke
Kemistry; Kemistry & Storm	35	April 25, 1999	Winchester, Hampshire, England	Traffic accident
Roger Troutman; Zapp	47	April 25, 1999	Dayton, Ohio, U.S.	Murdered by his brother Larry Troutman
Larry Troutman; Zapp	52	April 25, 1999	Dayton, Ohio, U.S.	Committed suicide after murdering his brother Roger Troutman
Adrian Borland; The Outsiders, The Sound	41	April 26, 1999	London, England	Suicide by railway train
Darrell Sweet; Nazareth	51	April 30, 1999	New Albany, Indiana, U.S.	Heart attack
Leon Thomas	61	May 8, 1999	The Bronx, New York, U.S.	Heart failure resulting from leukemia
William Tucker; Ministry	38	May 14, 1999	Chicago Illinois, U.S.	Suicide by knife and barbiturate overdose
Rob Gretton; Manager of Joy Division and New Order	46	May 15, 1999	Manchester, England	Heart attack
Bruce Fairbairn; Record producer for Van Halen, Bon Jovi, Aerosmith, AC/DC	49	May 17, 1999	Vancouver, British Columbia, Canada	Unknown causes
Augustus Pablo	45	May 18, 1999	Kingston, Jamaica	Myasthenia gravis/Collapsed lung
Eithne Ní Uallacháin	42	May 19, 1999	Carlingford, County Louth, Ireland	Suicide
Bugz; Member of D12	21	May 21, 1999	Grand Rapids, Michigan, U.S.	Shot and run over
Massimo Riva Italian singer-songwriter and musician,frontman of the Steve Rogers Band and one of Vasco Rossi's guitarists	36	May 31, 1999	Bologna, Italy	
Mel Tormé	73	June 5, 1999	Los Angeles, California, U.S.	Stroke
Ernie Wilkins	76	June 5, 1999	Copenhagen, Denmark	Stroke
Eddie Kurdziel; Guitarist for Redd Kross	38	June 6, 1999	Los Angeles, California, U.S.	Heroin overdose
Billy Brown; The Freshmen	56	June 6, 1999	Johnstown, County Kildare, Republic of Ireland	Heart attack
Fausto Papetti Italian saxophonist	76	June 15, 1999	Bordighera, Italy	Heart attack
Screaming Lord Sutch; Screaming Lord Sutch and the Savages	58	June 16, 1999	West Harrow, Middlesex, England	Suicide by hanging
Brian O'Hara; Lead guitarist for The Fourmost	57	June 16, 1999	Liverpool, Metropolitan Borough of Liverpool, Merseyside, England	Suicide by hanging
Frank C. Starr; Lead singer for The Four Horsemen	41	June 18, 1999	Torrance, Los Angeles, California, U.S.	Died after a 4-year coma caused by a motorcycle accident in 1995
Kami; Malice Mizer	27	June 21, 1999	Kyoto, Japan	Subarachnoid hemorrhage
Jimmy Archer; The Wrens	62	June 22, 1999	Bronx, New York, U.S.	Unknown
Bruce Day; Pablo Cruise	48	June 30, 1999	Windsor, California, U.S.	Unknown causes
Dennis Brown	42	July 1, 1999	Kingston, Jamaica	Cardiac arrest/Collapsed lung
Guy Mitchell	72	July 1, 1999	Las Vegas, Nevada, U.S.	Complications following surgery for cancer
Mark Sandman; Morphine	46	July 3, 1999	Palestrina, Lazio, Italy	Heart attack on stage
Kevin Wilkinson; China Crisis, Squeeze	41	July 17, 1999	Baydon, Swindon, England	Suicide by hanging
Gar Samuelson; Megadeth	41	July 14, 1999	Orange City, Florida, U.S.	Liver failure
Harry "Sweets" Edison	83	July 27, 1999	Columbus, Ohio, U.S.	Prostate cancer
Anita Carter; Carter Family, The Carter Sisters	66	July 29, 1999	Hendersonville, Tennessee, U.S.	Kidney & liver damage
Leroy Vinnegar	71	August 3, 1999	Portland, Oregon, U.S.	Heart attack
Tommy Ridgley	73	August 11, 1999	New Orleans, Louisiana, U.S.	Lung cancer
Johnny Byrne; Rhythm guitarist for Rory Storm	59	August 18, 1999	Liverpool, England	Motor neurone disease
Bobby Sheehan; Blues Traveler	31	August 20, 1999	New Orleans, Louisiana, U.S.	Heroin and cocaine overdose
Rob Fisher; Naked Eyes, Climie Fisher	42	August 25, 1999	Surrey, England	Following bowel surgery for cancer
Katie Webster	63	September 5, 1999	League City, Texas, U.S.	Heart failure
Moondog	83	September 8, 1999	Munster, Germany	Heart failure
Beau Jocque	45	September 10, 1999	Kinder, Louisiana, U.S.	Heart attack
Chuck Higgins	75	September 14, 1999	Los Angeles, California, U.S.	Lung cancer
Ed Cobb; The Four Preps	61	September 19, 1999	Honolulu, Hawaii, U.S.	Leukemia
Lena Zavaroni	35	October 1, 1999	Heath, Cardiff, Wales	Pneumonia
Claude Bessy; Catholic Discipline	53	October 2, 1999	Barcelona, Spain	Lung cancer
Art Farmer	71	October 4, 1999	New York City, New York, U.S.	Heart attack
Erik Brødreskift; Borknagar, Gorgoroth	29	October 4, 1999	Bergen, Norway	Suicide by drug overdose
Nella Colombo Italian singer and actress	72	October 4, 1999	Turin, Italy	
Amália Rodrigues Potuguese singer and actress	79	October 6, 1999	Lisbon, Portugal	
Milt Jackson; Modern Jazz Quartet	76	October 9, 1999	New York City, New York, U.S.	Liver cancer
Ella Mae Morse	75	October 16, 1999	Bullhead City, Arizona, U.S.	Respiratory failure
Hoyt Axton	61	October 26, 1999	Victor, Montana, U.S.	Heart attack
Rex Gildo	63	October 26, 1999	Frankfurt, Germany	Suicide
Wes Berggren; Tripping Daisy	28	October 27, 1999	Dallas, Texas, U.S.	Cocaine and morphine overdose
Rob Hoeke	60	November 6, 1999	Krommenie, Netherlands	Died after a short illness
Herb Abramson; Record company executive, record producer and co-founder of Atlantic Records	82	November 9, 1999	Henderson, Nevada, U.S.	Unknown
Little Miss Cornshucks	76	November 12, 1999	Indianapolis, Indiana, U.S.	Stroke
Doug Sahm	58	November 18, 1999	Taos, New Mexico, U.S.	Heart attack
Smokey Joe Baugh	67	November 19, 1999	Monterey, California, U.S.	
Alvin Cash	60	November 21, 1999	Chicago, Illinois, U.S.	Ulcer compilations
Howard Biggs	83	November 24, 1999	Houston, Texas, U.S.	
Clifford Jarvis	58	November 26, 1999	London, England	Unknown
Johnny "Big Moose" Walker	72	November 27, 1999	Chicago, Illinois, U.S.	Unknown
Curtis Knight	70	November 29, 1999	Lelystad, Flevoland, Netherlands	Cancer
Don "Sugarcane" Harris; Don and Dewey	61	December 1, 1999	Los Angeles, California, U.S.	Complications from pulmonary disease
Charlie Byrd	74	December 2, 1999	Annapolis, Maryland, U.S.	Lung cancer
Madeline Kahn	57	December 3, 1999	New York City, New York, U.S.	Ovarian cancer
Scatman John	57	December 3, 1999	Los Angeles, California, U.S.	Lung cancer
Bobby Marchan	69	December 5, 1999	Gretna, Louisiana, U.S.	Liver cancer
Rick Danko; The Band	55	December 10, 1999	Marbletown, New York, U.S.	Heart failure
Charles Earland	58	December 11, 1999	Kansas City, Missouri, U.S.	Heart failure
Dave Shogren; Bassist for The Doobie Brothers	49	December 14, 1999	San Jose, California, U.S.	Pneumonia
Grover Washington Jr.	56	December 17, 1999	New York City, New York, U.S.	Heart attack
Joe Higgs	59	December 18, 1999	Los Angeles, California, U.S.	Cancer
Billy Davenport; Paul Butterfield Blues Band	68	December 24, 1999	Chicago, Illinois, U.S.	Unknown
Curtis Mayfield; The Impressions	57	December 26, 1999	Roswell, Georgia, U.S.	Complications due to diabetes
Evgeny "Makhno" Pyanov; Guitarist and bassist of the Russian punk band Grazhdanskaya Oborona	27	December 28, 1999	Omsk, Russia	Accidental fall from window
Mustafa Ismailovski; Croatian musician, songwriter, and composer; worked with Dalibor Brun, Zdenka Kovačiček, Divlje Jagode, Srebrna krila, and Minea	43	December 31, 1999	Zagreb, Croatia	Natural causes

== See also ==
- List of 1950s deaths in popular music
- List of 1960s deaths in popular music
- List of 1970s deaths in popular music
- List of 1980s deaths in popular music
- List of 2000s deaths in popular music
- List of 2010s deaths in popular music
- List of 2020s deaths in popular music
