= Bill Taft =

Background information
- Born: William Wilson Taft, Jr. 1965 (age 60–61); Shaker Heights, Ohio
- Origin: Georgia, United States
- Genres: Punk rock Folk
- Instruments: Vocals, Guitar, Cornet, Banjo
- Years active: 1980s–2000s

Bill Taft is an American rock musician living in Atlanta, Georgia.

== Biography ==
Taft is the son of former Ohio state Senator William W. Taft, and a distant cousin of former United States President William Howard Taft. In 1982, Taft moved from Ohio to Atlanta to attend Emory University. His first band of note was The Chowder Shouters, whose instruments included garbage cans. They released a six-song vinyl record. After the demise of the Chowder Shouters, Taft joined The Opal Foxx Quartet, a group consisting of anywhere from 2 to 14 members at a time. They broke up in 1992 after the deaths of several members. They released a posthumous CD, which was largely produced by Michael Stipe.

Around 1988, Taft started An Evening with the Garbageman, a spoken-word open-mic variety show that eventually morphed into The Jody Grind. The Jody Grind released two CDs before disbanding following the death of half their members.

After The Jody Grind broke up in 1992, Taft formed Kick Me, with Allen Page (of Opal Foxx Quartet) and Kelly Hogan (of The Jody Grind). They recorded several songs that eventually came out on a compilation album called Hidden Tracks, released by Daemon Records in 2000.. In 2017, their song "Blue Magic" was used in the "Winter Fox" episode of the Adventure Time miniseries Elements. Kick Me broke up after Allen Page died of a drug overdose.

Taft's most famous band, Smoke, recorded two full-length CDs and several compilation tracks before their singer Benjamin died in 1999. Benjamin and the rest of the band were the subject of a 2000 documentary by Jem Cohen and Pete Sillen. In 2000, Taft started Hubcap City, who performed for about a decade until the surviving members of Smoke formed Smoke That City.. Smoke That City disbanded in 2014 when guitarist Coleman Lewis died of a heroin overdose.

Around 2017, Taft, along with Brian Halloran (cello) and Will Fratesi (drums) (of Smoke) started the band W8ing4UFOs, who have released multiple albums.

== Bands and Instruments ==
- Dr. Dixon and the Operators: guitar
- Crawling Kingsnakes guitar and vocals
- The Chowder Shouters: guitar and vocals
- Opal Foxx Quartet: guitar
- The Jody Grind: guitar and vocals
- Kick Me: guitar, vocals
- Smoke: vocals, cornet, banjo
- Hubcap City: vocals, guitar, cornet, banjo
- W8ing4UFOs: vocals, guitar, banjo

== Discography ==
=== The Chowder Shouters ===
- Chowder Shouters vinyl (1986)
1. Weather Report
2. Little Wing
3. Amazing Grace
4. Instrumental
5. The Arkansas Side
6. The Old Tar River

.

=== Opal Foxx Quartet ===
- The Love That Won't Shut Up CD (1994, LongPlay Records)
1. Clean White Bed
2. Frail Body
3. Blue Exception
4. Sleep
5. Tub of Love Rumble
6. Nightingale
7. MTM
8. Christmas
9. Dirt
10. I Don't Know How to Love Him/Strange Fruit
11. Aliens

Track 1 written by Tracy Snow. Track 2 written by Grady Cousins. Track 4 written by Debbey Richardson. Track 5 is Deacon Lunchbox sleeping in the back of a truck. Track 7 is The Mary Tyler Moore Show Theme Song, "Love is All Around." Track 10 is a medley of the song from Jesus Christ Superstar and the Billie Holiday song. Track 11 written and performed by Deacon Lunchbox.

=== The Jody Grind ===
- One Man's Trash is Another Man's Treasure CD (1991, DB Records)
1. Peter Gunn
2. One Man's Trash (Is Another Man's Treasure)
3. Eight-Ball
4. Mood Indigo
5. Death of Zorba
6. Blue and Far
7. Governor of Hong Kong
8. Just Because You Wear Big Shoes
9. It Ain't Necessarily So
10. Love, Love Alone
11. Wishin' and Hopin'
12. My Darlin'
13. Florida Maine
14. I'm a Fool to Want You
- Lefty's Deceiver CD (1992, Ichiban)
1. 3rd Of July
2. Lounge Axe
3. Funnel Of Love
4. Friday
5. Hands Of June
6. Can't You See
7. Promise Of Sleep
8. Circle
9. Driving At Night
10. Superhero
11. Rickie
12. Carry You
13. Blues For The Living

=== Smoke ===
- Dirt 7" (1993, Colossal Records)
1. Dirt
2. Pretend
- Heaven on a Popsicle Stick CD (1994, LongPlay Records)
1. Hole
2. Awake
3. Freak (Winn's Song)
4. The Trip
5. Hank Aaron (lyrics by Dana Kletter)
6. Luke's Feet
7. Beeper Will
8. The Pond
9. I Do
10. Ballet
11. Guilt
12. Abigail
13. Curtains
- Another Reason To Fast CD (1995, LongPlay Records)
1. Trust
2. Friends
3. When It Rains
4. Clean White Bed
5. Shadow Box
6. Dream
7. Fatherland
8. Train Song
9. Debbey's Song
10. Chad
11. That Look
12. I Don't
13. Snake

=== Hubcap City ===
- EP 1 CD (2001, Self-released)
1. Day Job
2. My Punk Ass
3. Paul's Boot
4. My Wasted Friends
5. Weegee
- Live: 2001-2002 CD (2002, H.I.G. Records 004)
1. Action!
2. Breakfast at Taxi Driver's
3. The Man Who Never Forgets
4. Hubcap City
5. Paul's Boot
6. Reservoir
7. Some Things
8. Stomp/Atomic Fireball
9. Faulkner's Typewriter
10. Debby
11. Vital Pimp Flash
12. Ready to Serve
13. Rahab
14. Jack Henry
15. The Top of the Hill
16. Sandbox
17. Beautiful and Fucked Up

Tracks 1-8 recorded at WREK radio on 11/13/01.
Tracks 9 and 12 recorded outside at Railroad Earth Studios 5/19/01.
Track 10 recorded at Eyedrum 3/10/01.
Track 11 recorded 12/30/01 at The Earl.
Tracks 13-17 recorded 8/02/02 at Earthshaking Music.

- EP 2 CD (2002, self-released)
1. Reservoir
2. Breakfast at Taxi Driver's
3. Action
4. Atomic Fireball
5. Hubcap City
- EP 3 CD (2004, self-released)
1. Jack Henry
2. Kiss Me, Arturo
3. Left Eye Went the Wrong Way
4. Sandbox
5. Cat Hair on Rockabilly Dress
6. Slug Party
7. Door
- More Songs For Dead Children CD (2004, self-released)
1. Will's 4-Track
2. Damaged
3. Fried
4. Hold On
5. Slough of Despond
6. Court
7. Dumped
8. Sassy Magazine Record Review #2: Dear Madonna
9. One-Eyed Rapists Attack
10. Unfinished Film Festival Song
11. Beautiful and Fucked Up
- Super Local 13 CD (2005, self-released)
1. Staircase
2. Hurrah Hurrah
3. U Don't Know Me Stomp
4. Message Received 2:34 AM Thursday
5. Guest of Honor
6. Five Slugs More Party Minutes
7. 7 Zebra Heads 2 Plastic Skulls
8. Yippie Yeah Yeah
9. Message Received 2:51 AM Thursday
10. Preacher
11. Blackout
12. Ham on Rye
13. Snarl Baby Snarl

.

=== Hubcap City (from Belgium) ===
- Deerhunter/Hubcap City Split 7" (2006, Rob's House Records)
1. Hubcap City - Mad House
2. Deerhunter - Grayscale
- Five More Minutes b/w Sally 7" (2006, Ponce de Leon Records)
1. Five More Minutes
2. Sally
- Superlocalhellfreakride CD (2007, Xeric 112)
1. Get Rid of Now
2. Unexpected Guest
3. Ring Around the Rosie
4. Wind Blowing on a Sick Man
5. Deer Hunting
6. Sticks in the Graveyard
7. Valley of Bones
8. No Return
9. When the President Sez
10. Bottle of Rum
11. He Brings the Hatchet in the Evening
12. Rahab 2:39
13. Boxcar Gamelan
14. Guy on Street
15. Hippest Trick
16. More Guy on Street
17. Arabella Sabotage
18. The Anti-Christ is Alive...

.

=== with Kelly Hogan ===
- The Mother of all Flagpole Christmas Albums CD (1992, Flagpole)
1. Introduction - Deacon Lunchbox
2. Santa's Hard - Follow for Now
3. Thomas Tinsel's Holiday - Kevn Kinney
4. Santa vs Magneto - Bliss
5. Santa Baby - Michelle Malone
6. Santa Claus - The Woggles
7. Jingle Bells - Flat Duo Jets
8. Learn to Love Again - Dreams So Real
9. Papa's Home - Widespread Panic
10. Here Comes Christmas - Daisy
11. You're a Mean One Mr. Grinch - Labrea Stompers
12. Santa Claus, Go Straight to the Ghetto - Seersucker
13. Snowflakes Are Falling - Hear it Love it Dance it
14. Christmas in August - BloodKin
15. Just Think About Christmas (And Sing What You Want) - Five Eight
16. O Magnum Mysterium - Kelly Hogan and Bill Taft
17. No Vacancy - Marlee MacLeod
18. On Christmas Day - Opal Foxx Quartet
19. Candles and Miracles - Hetch Hetchy
20. This Holiday Season - Porn Orchard
21. Christmas With the Devil - Allgood
22. White Christmas - Vic Chesnutt

=== Cake ===
- Low Life 17 LP (1993, RRRecords)

Side a:

1. Tinnitus - Seven Minutes or Less
2. Cake (Tracy Snow) - Blue Moles
3. Cake (Tracy Snow) - I Want to Sleep
4. Freedom Puff - Visiting with the White Rock Girl
5. Freedom Puff - 2 Dixie Cups and a String

Side b:

1. Murray Reams & Paul Hoskin - The Dispossessed
2. Murray Reams & Paul Hoskin - Submission
3. I See the Moon - Somnambulist Waltz
4. I See the Moon - Snellville
5. Dairy Queen Empire - The World
6. Dairy Queen Empire - Burning

NOTE: Bill played banjo for Cake on this record.

=== Solo ===
- The Soft-Spoken Beatnik Cousin of the Flagpole Christmas Albums cassette (1994, LongPlay Records)

Side 1

1. Gayle Danley - Just Like the Girl on Channel 17
2. Chris Chandler - Just Say No But Spell it with a K
3. Hillary Meister - Latkes at Chanukkah in America
4. Gwen O Looney - Meditations for Women who Do Too Much
5. Randy Blazak - Jump Around Santa
6. Charlie Ginste - Flockogank
7. Mudcat - Rudoplh's Party
8. Copacetic Chris - A Holiday Poem
9. David Oats - Shopping Prayer
10. David Greenberger - Let Women Chase Me
11. Blondie - The 12 Days of Christmas
12. Murray Attaway - Up on the Housetop
13. Sheila Doyle - Christmas Island

Side 2

1. Deadbeat Burt - Rudolph the Red Eyed Reindeer
2. Douglas A. Martin - Undercover Empty Moon Gazing
3. A.E. Stallings - A Winter Nursery Rhyme
4. Vic Varney - True North
5. Ripley - I Drank with the Devil
6. R. Tod Smith - Christmas at Charter
7. David Greenberger - Quincy Sore Throat
8. Julie Thrasher - Cowboy Dreams
9. Richard Fausset w/Neutral Platypus Uncollective - Under the Breath of The Salvation Army Santa
10. Scott Royal - Joke
11. Emory Laughing Wolf - Merry Grimace
12. Todd Mortensen - Autumn's Prayer, Winter's Touch
13. Bear Step and Joe Brennan - Bear and Joe's Wish List
14. Bill Taft - Happy Birthday Baby Jesus

=== Smoke ===
- ? CD (1992)
1. Smoke - Dog

The lineup on this song was Benjamin, Bill Taft, Brian Halloran, and Todd Butler. This CD was a benefit compilation.

- Radio Oddyssey Volume 2: The Georgia Music Show CD (1997 Altered Records/Ichiban)
1. The Rock*A*Teens - Black Ice
2. The Continentals - Please, Please
3. Pineal Ventana - Dark Cloud
4. DQE - Mermaid And The Sailor
5. #1 Family Mover - Hey Soul
6. Bob - Ants
7. Velvet Overkill Five - Pillow Talk
8. The Goodies - Live On WRAS-FM
9. Tweezer - Sucking Midgets
10. Marcy - Driver
11. Heinous Bienfang - Stay Behind The Cones
12. Babyfat - Redd Lobster
13. Frontstreet - Scandinavian Pamphlet (Sex Book)
14. 17 Years - Doing Wrong
15. Smoke - Hamlet
16. Benjamin - Big Daddy Story and Other Saucy Tales
- Rudy's Rockin' Kiddie Caravan CD (1997 Bloodshot Records)
1. Susie Honeyman - Bus
2. Schoolly D - This Old Man
3. Smoke - Old Joe Clark
4. Calexico - The Man on the Flying Trapeze
5. The Waco Brothers - Them Bones
6. Giant Sand - Blow the Man Down
7. Anne Richmond Boston - What Can the Matter Be?
8. D. L. Menard & the Louisiana Aces - J'ai Passe Devant Ta Porte?
9. Zydeco Elvis - The ABC Song
10. Sally Timms - Hush Little Baby
11. New Orleans Klezmer All Stars - Nokas for the Kinder
12. The Chiselers - Playmate
13. The Rock*A*Teens - She'll Be Coming 'Round the Mountain
14. Moonshine Willy - Skip to My Lou
15. Kelly Hogan - The Great Titanic
16. The Black Mama Dharma Band - A Frozen Road
17. Mekons - Oranges & Lemons
18. New Kingdom - John Henry
19. Rob Gal - Twinkle Twinkle Little Star
20. Blacktop Rockets - Froggy Went A-Courtin'
21. Vic Chesnutt - Home on the Range
22. The Grifters - The Muffin Man
- Hidden Tracks CD (2000, Daemon Records)
1. Kick Me - Arms
2. Smoke - Midnight
3. DQE - Ivytwine
4. Parlour - The Cold Snap
5. Kick Me - Black Coat
6. Kick Me - Blue Midnight
7. Parlour - Baby Doll
8. Bill Taft & Neil Fried - Old West
9. Smoke - Pretend
10. Palookaville - Seventh Day
11. Long Flat Red - Eighty-Six Days
12. Railroad Earth - Keep Seeing That Soul
13. Kick Me - Lucky Nights
14. The Hollidays - Miles Away

=== Guest appearances ===
Indigo Girls - Shaming of the Sun CD (1997, Daemon Records)
12. Hey Kind Friend
Taft played cornet on this song, written about his friend Benjamin.

The Rock*A*Teens - The Rock*A*Teens (January 23, 1996)
13. Arm in Arm in the Golden Twilight We Loitered On
Taft played cornet on this track.

Greg Connors - Full Moon Flashlight CD (2009, Scared Records)
4. Two Women and A Flood (Sweet Distraction)
9. September Baby, a cover of a song written by Joseph Arthur
Taft played cornet on both these tracks.

Adventure Time "Blue Magic", written by Jack Pendarvis, sung by Kelly Hogan, with guitar performance by Bill Taft.

== See also ==
- Smoke
- Hubcap City
- Sweet Pea interview with Bill Taft
