= The Jody Grind (band) =

American band

- Origin: Cabbagetown, Atlanta, Georgia, U.S.
- Genre: Alternative
- Years active: 1988–1992
- Label: DB Records
- Past members: Kelly Hogan, Bill Taft, David Ellis, Walter Brewer, Robert Hayes, Rob Clayton

The Jody Grind was an American band from the Cabbagetown neighborhood of Atlanta, Georgia, United States.

Karen Schoemer's review of their debut album for The New York Times put their sound in historical context: "This young band from Atlanta is so at home with the musical languages of past eras, one can imagine it sharing cocktail chitchat with Duke Ellington, Frank Sinatra and the Gershwins." Billboard's Chris Morris described them as "a sweet, swinging Atlanta act."

The Jody Grind opened for R.E.M., Bob Margolin, Robyn Hitchcock and Poi Dog Pondering.

== History ==
In 1988, vocalist Kelly Hogan met Bill Taft at one of his open mic nights at the White Dot in Atlanta. A mutual appreciation of old-time jazz and swing kicked off the friendship, and Taft soon invited Hogan to perform with him. They were soon joined by David Ellis (bass) and Walter Brewer (drums) and performed as An Evening With the Garbagemen. Ellis left soon after, and the band continued as a three-piece. He was eventually replaced by Robert Hayes.

By 1989, they were called the Jody Grind. In 1990, the band released their debut album, One Man's Trash (Is Another Man's Treasure). It was produced by John Keane and released by DB Records. Said Schoemer of that debut album: "Their eclecticism never sounds forced; the performances are loose and enthusiastic, and each song is linked by the smoky, sashaying vocals of Kelly Hogan Murray. Her singing, like the album, feels effortless and lovely." By 1990 they were playing packed crowds in Atlanta, many times sharing the bill with Atlanta performance artist and poet Deacon Lunchbox.

In 1992, the Jody Grind released their second album, Lefty's Deceiver. It was also produced by John Keane and released by DB Records. Soon after the album was recorded, Rob Clayton joined the band as their new drummer.

On April 19, 1992, less than a week after the release of Lefty’s Deceiver, a camper driven by a drunk driver crossed the I-65 median near Greenville, Alabama, and struck a borrowed van carrying Clayton, Hayes and Deacon Lunchbox, who were heading back to Atlanta from shows in Florida. Clayton, Hayes and Deacon Lunchbox died at the scene. Hogan and Taft had decided to spend the night in Pensacola and did not learn of the crash until arriving home.

After the crash, Hogan and Taft disbanded the Jody Grind and formed a duo called Kick Me. Allen Page joined Kick Me, but the band broke up following his heroin overdose in 1994.

Hogan later moved to Chicago to continue a solo career, and has since played with a variety of bands, including Rock*A*Teens, Wee Hairy Beasties and Neko Case. Taft still lives in Atlanta and has been involved with several projects since, including Another Evening with the Garbageman, Smoke, Hubcap City and W8ing4UFOs.

== Discography ==
=== Albums ===
- One Man's Trash (Is Another Man's Treasure) (1990, DB Records)
- Lefty's Deceiver (1992, DB Records/GMM Records)
