= DQE (disambiguation) =

DQE could refer to:

- DQE Holdings, Inc.
- De Queen and Eastern Railroad; reporting mark DQE
- Detective Quantum Efficiency (imaging)
- DQE (band)
