= Hubcap City =

American band

- Hubcap City performing live at Eyedrum in Atlanta, GA in 2001

Background information
- Origin: Atlanta, GA, U.S.

Hubcap City (From Belgium) is a band from Atlanta, Georgia that formed in 2000 after the end of Bill Taft and Will Fratesi's previous band, Smoke.

== History ==
The group played their first show at the Benjamin Smoke celebration, when Bill asked Will to play percussion on some of Bill's guitar and vocals-based songs. They continued as a duo for several years under the name Hubcap City, releasing several homemade CDs.
In 2003, they changed their name to Hubcap City (From Belgium), despite being Americans. They integrated this concept into their concerts, with Bill claiming to be named Leopold, and Will claiming to be named Wilhelm. Bill also introduced original songs as "The Belgian National Anthem.".
In 2003, Matthew Proctor joined the band while Will was away playing drums on tour with Cat Power. When Will returned, Hubcap City (From Belgium) became a trio.
In 2005, Kat Hairston and Terry Boling joined the band, playing violin & vocals and saw, respectively. Kat Hairston left the band in the spring of 2007.
In 2006, HC(FB) released its first 7", the Deerhunter/Hubcap City Split on Rob's House Records. Later that year, they released their first full 7", "Sally" b/w "Five More Minutes" on Ponce de Leon Records.
In 2007, Hubcap City (From Belgium) released their first nationally distributed CD, Superlocalhellfreakride..

Hubcap City stopped performing in 2011 when Terry, Will and Bill joined Smoke That City.

== Discography ==
- EP 1 CD (2001, Self-released)
1. Day Job
2. My Punk Ass
3. Paul's Boot
4. My Wasted Friends
5. Weegee
- Live: 2001-2002 CD (2002, HIG Records 004)
1. Action!
2. Breakfast at Taxi Driver's
3. The Man Who Never Forgets
4. Hubcap City
5. Paul's Boot
6. Reservoir
7. Some Things
8. Stomp/Atomic Fireball
9. Faulkner's Typewriter
10. Debby
11. Vital Pimp Flash
12. Ready to Serve
13. Rahab
14. Jack Henry
15. The Top of the Hill
16. Sandbox
17. Beautiful and Fucked Up

Tracks 1-8 recorded at WREK radio on 11/13/01.
Tracks 9 and 12 recorded outside at Railroad Earth Studios 5/19/01.
Track 10 recorded at Eyedrum 3/10/01.
Track 11 recorded 12/30/01 at The Earl.
Tracks 13-17 recorded 8/02/02 at Earthshaking Music.

- EP 2 CD (2002, self-released)
1. Reservoir
2. Breakfast at Taxi Driver's
3. Action
4. Atomic Fireball
5. Hubcap City
- EP 3 CD (2004, self-released)
1. Jack Henry
2. Kiss Me, Arturo
3. Left Eye Went the Wrong Way
4. Sandbox
5. Cat Hair on Rockabilly Dress
6. Slug Party
7. Door
- More Songs For Dead Children CD (2004, self-released)
1. Will's 4-Track
2. Damaged
3. Fried
4. Hold On
5. Slough of Despond
6. Court
7. Dumped
8. Sassy Magazine Record Review #2: Dear Madonna
9. One-Eyed Rapists Attack
10. Unfinished Film Festival Song
11. Beautiful and Fucked Up
- Super Local 13 CD (2005, self-released)
1. Staircase
2. Hurrah Hurrah
3. U Don't Know Me Stomp
4. Message Received 2:34 AM Thursday
5. Guest of Honor
6. Five Slugs More Party Minutes
7. 7 Zebra Heads 2 Plastic Skulls
8. Yippie Yeah Yeah
9. Message Received 2:51 AM Thursday
10. Preacher
11. Blackout
12. Ham on Rye
13. Snarl Baby Snarl

NOTE: All of the above CDs were only ever available through trade. All of the following recordings were also available for sale:

- Deerhunter/Hubcap City Split 7" (2006, Rob's House Records)
1. Hubcap City - Mad House
2. Deerhunter - Grayscale
- Five More Minutes b/w Sally 7" (2006, Ponce de Leon Records)
1. Five More Minutes
2. Sally
- Superlocalhellfreakride CD (2007, Xeric 112)
1. Get Rid of Now
2. Unexpected Guest
3. Ring Around the Rosie
4. Wind Blowing on a Sick Man
5. Deer Hunting
6. Sticks in the Graveyard
7. Valley of Bones
8. No Return
9. When the President Sez
10. Bottle of Rum
11. He Brings the Hatchet in the Evening
12. Rahab 2:39
13. Boxcar Gamelan
14. Guy on Street
15. Hippest Trick
16. More Guy on Street
17. Arabella Sabotage
18. The Anti-Christ is Alive...
