= The Mirage (band) =

British psychedelic pop band (1965–1968)

- Origin: Hertford, England
- Genres: Psychedelic rock Psychedelic pop
- Years active: 1965–1968
- Labels: CBS, Philips (UK), RPM (UK)
- Past members: Dee Murray; Pete Hynes; Ray Glynn; Pat Hynes; Dave Hynes

The Mirage is a late 1960s psychedelic pop band from London, England. They released seven singles in the UK.

== Career ==
Their most notable release was their 1967 single, "The Wedding of Ramona Blair". The Mirage were under contract as house band to Dick James Publishing and backed Elton John at some of his early concerts. Bassist Dee Murray later worked Elton John's band.

Dave Hynes and Murray replaced Pete York and Eddie Hardin in The Spencer Davis Group in October 1968. Hynes and other members of the Mirage formed the Portobello Explosion. That band then changed into the equally no-commercial Jawbone.

== Band members ==
- Dee Murray – bass guitar, vocals
- Pete Hynes – vocals
- Ray Glynn – lead guitar, vocals
- Pat Hynes – rhythm guitar
- Dave Hynes – drums, vocals

== Discography ==
- Tomorrow Never Knows – The Pop Sike World of The Mirage – singles and lost sessions 1966–1968 (Compilation album on RPM Records – RPMBC319)
  - "Tomorrow Never Knows" (Philips Bf 1534) 1966
  - "You Can't Be Serious" (Philips Bf 1534) 1966
  - "Go To Your Head"
  - "Spare A Thought For Me"
  - "Hold On" (Phillips Bf 1554) 1967
  - "Can You Hear Me" (Philips Bf 1554) 1967
  - "One More Time"
  - "That I Know"
  - "The Wedding Of Ramona Blair" (Philips Bf 1571) 1967
  - "Lazy Man" (Philips Bf 1571) 1967
  - "Ebaneezer Beaver"
  - "Mrs Busby"
  - "I See The Rain"
  - "Lonely Highway"
  - "Hello Enid"
  - "Is Anybody Home"
  - "What Do I Care"
  - "How's Your Pa"
  - "Lazy Man Version 2"
  - "See My World"
  - "Katherine"
  - "Ebaneezer Beaver"
  - "Go Away" (with Graham Nash)
