= Smoke (American band) =

- Origin: Atlanta, Georgia, United States
- Genres: Punk, blues, folk, rock
- Years active: 1992-1999
- Labels: Long Play Records; OrtTone; Table of the Elements
- Past members: Benjamin; Bill Taft; Brian Halloran; Todd Butler; Coleman Lewis; Tim Campion; Will Fratesi

Smoke was a band from the Cabbagetown neighborhood of Atlanta, Georgia that dissolved in 1999 with the death of writer/singer Benjamin. Benjamin was the subject of Peter Sillen and Jem Cohen's documentary Benjamin Smoke (2000).

== History ==
The group formed during the demise of the Opal Foxx Quartet, starting with Benjamin on vocals, Bill Taft on cornet and banjo, Brian Halloran on cello, and Todd Butler on guitar. Coleman Lewis and Tim Campion later joined on guitar and drums, respectively, followed by Will Fratesi on drums. Their last show was New Year's Eve, 1998. Benjamin died January 29, 1999.

Bill Taft and Will Fratesi went on to form Hubcap City, Smoke That City, and W8ing4UFOs.

Former guitarist Coleman Lewis died from a heroin overdose in May 2014.

== Discography ==
- Pretend 7" (1993, Colossal Records)
1. Pretend
2. Dirt
- Heaven on a Popsicle Stick CD (1994, LongPlay Records)
1. Hole
2. Awake
3. Freak (Winn's Song)
4. The Trip
5. Hank Aaron (lyrics by Dana Kletter)
6. Luke's Feet
7. Beeper Will
8. The Pond
9. I Do
10. Ballet
11. Guilt
12. Abigail
13. Curtains
- Another Reason To Fast CD (1995, LongPlay Records)
1. Trust
2. Friends
3. When It Rains
4. Clean White Bed
5. Shadow Box
6. Dream
7. Fatherland
8. Train Song
9. Debbey's Song
10. Chad
11. That Look
12. I Don't
13. Snake

=== Compilation appearances ===
- ? CD (1992)
1. Smoke - Dog

The lineup on this song was Benjamin, Bill Taft, Brian Halloran, and Todd Butler. This CD was a benefit compilation.

- Radio Oddyssey Volume 2: The Georgia Music Show CD (1997 Altered Records/Ichiban)
1. The Rock*A*Teens - Black Ice
2. The Continentals - Please, Please
3. Pineal Ventana - Dark Cloud
4. DQE - Mermaid And The Sailor
5. No. 1 Family Mover - Hey Soul
6. Bob - Ants
7. Velvet Overkill Five - Pillow Talk
8. The Goodies - Live On WRAS-FM
9. Tweezer - Sucking Midgets
10. Marcy - Driver
11. Heinous Bienfang - Stay Behind The Cones
12. Babyfat - Redd Lobster
13. Frontstreet - Scandinavian Pamphlet (Sex Book)
14. 17 Years - Doing Wrong
15. Smoke - Hamlet
16. Benjamin - Big Daddy Story and Other Saucy Tales
- Rudy's Rockin' Kiddie Caravan CD (1997 Bloodshot Records)
1. Susie Honeyman - Bus
2. Schoolly D - This Old Man
3. Smoke - Old Joe Clark
4. Calexico - The Man on the Flying Trapeze
5. The Waco Brothers - Them Bones
6. Giant Sand - Blow the Man Down
7. Anne Richmond Boston - What Can the Matter Be?
8. D. L. Menard & the Louisiana Aces - J'ai Passe Devant Ta Porte?
9. Zydeco Elvis - The ABC Song
10. Sally Timms - Hush Little Baby
11. New Orleans Klezmer All Stars - Nokas for the Kinder
12. The Chiselers - Playmate
13. The Rock*A*Teens - She'll Be Coming 'Round the Mountain
14. Moonshine Willy - Skip to My Lou
15. Kelly Hogan - The Great Titanic
16. The Black Mama Dharma Band - A Frozen Road
17. Mekons - Oranges & Lemons
18. New Kingdom - John Henry
19. Rob Gal - Twinkle Twinkle Little Star
20. Blacktop Rockets - Froggy Went A-Courtin'
21. Vic Chesnutt - Home on the Range
22. The Grifters - The Muffin Man
- Hidden Tracks] CD (2000, Daemon Records)
1. Kick Me - Arms
2. Smoke - Midnight
3. DQE - Ivytwine
4. Parlour - The Cold Snap
5. Kick Me - Black Coat
6. Kick Me - Blue Midnight
7. Parlour - Baby Doll
8. Bill Taft & Neil Fried - Old West
9. Smoke - Pretend
10. Palookaville - Seventh Day
11. Long Flat Red - Eighty-Six Days
12. Railroad Earth - Keep Seeing That Soul
13. Kick Me - Lucky Nights
14. The Hollidays - Miles Away
