= Deacon Lunchbox =

American poet

Deacon Lunchbox was the stage name of Atlanta performance artist and poet Timothy Tyson Ruttenber (1950 – April 19, 1992). Ruttenber, a construction worker by day, was popular in the Atlanta area for his flamboyant spoken-word performances. He often punctuated each line of his poems by banging an old torpedo casing or metal bucket with a hammer. His onstage props included a chainsaw, and often a bra was part of his costume.

In April 1991, Ruttenber performed live with Bill Taft at the opening night of the "Cartoon Show" at 800 EAST, an arts collective and performance space in Atlanta.

Ruttenber is credited with giving the Atlanta alternative country music scene of the time the name "The Redneck Underground."

Ruttenber died in an auto accident in 1992, along with Rob Clayton and Robert Hayes of the Atlanta group The Jody Grind. The three were riding in a rented cargo van near Greenville, Alabama, at the time of the accident, when a drunk driver crossed the I-65 median and struck them head-on.

He appeared in Words in Your Face, an episode of the show Alive from Off Center about spoken-word performers,reciting his poem "Lewis Grizzard, I'm Callin' You Out."

== Film appearances ==
- Alive from Off Center - Words in Your Face (1991) PBS TV Episode
- Benjamin Smoke (2000)
- Coffeehouse: Atlanta's Underground Poets (1992) Documentary of Atlanta's Spoken Word scene, containing the last interview with Deacon Lunchbox.
- Crash Course in Brain Sodomy (1990) by Kreg Thornley and Brett Lewis. Cameo appearance

== Publications ==
- Some Different Kinds of Songs (1989) A collection of monologues. Publisher: Drewry Lane Book Makers
- The Complete Lunchbox: The Life and Works of Deacon Lunchbox, a Cornucopia of Southern Culture by Robert S. Roarty (Editor), Tim Ruttenber

== Recordings ==
- Rantin' 'n' Railin' (1990)
- An Evening with the Garbageman and Deacon Lunchbox January 24, 1989 (WREK: The Underground Recordings)
- The Mother of All Flagpole Christmas Albums (1992)

== Poems ==
- All I Want is Her Love and a Brand New Harley
- Death of an Amway Salesman
- I'm Bustin' Down the Road Doin' Sixty
- I'm Just an Old Redneck Hippy
- Lewis Grizzard I'm Calling You Out
- Life in Midtown Atlanta
- My Vacations Plans are Ruined
- Nadine and Tony
- Omni Beer
- Quagmire of Skankmud
- Yuppie Bastard
