= Eyedrum =

Art gallery in Atlanta, Georgia

Coordinates: 33°44′49.6″N 84°22′37.5″W

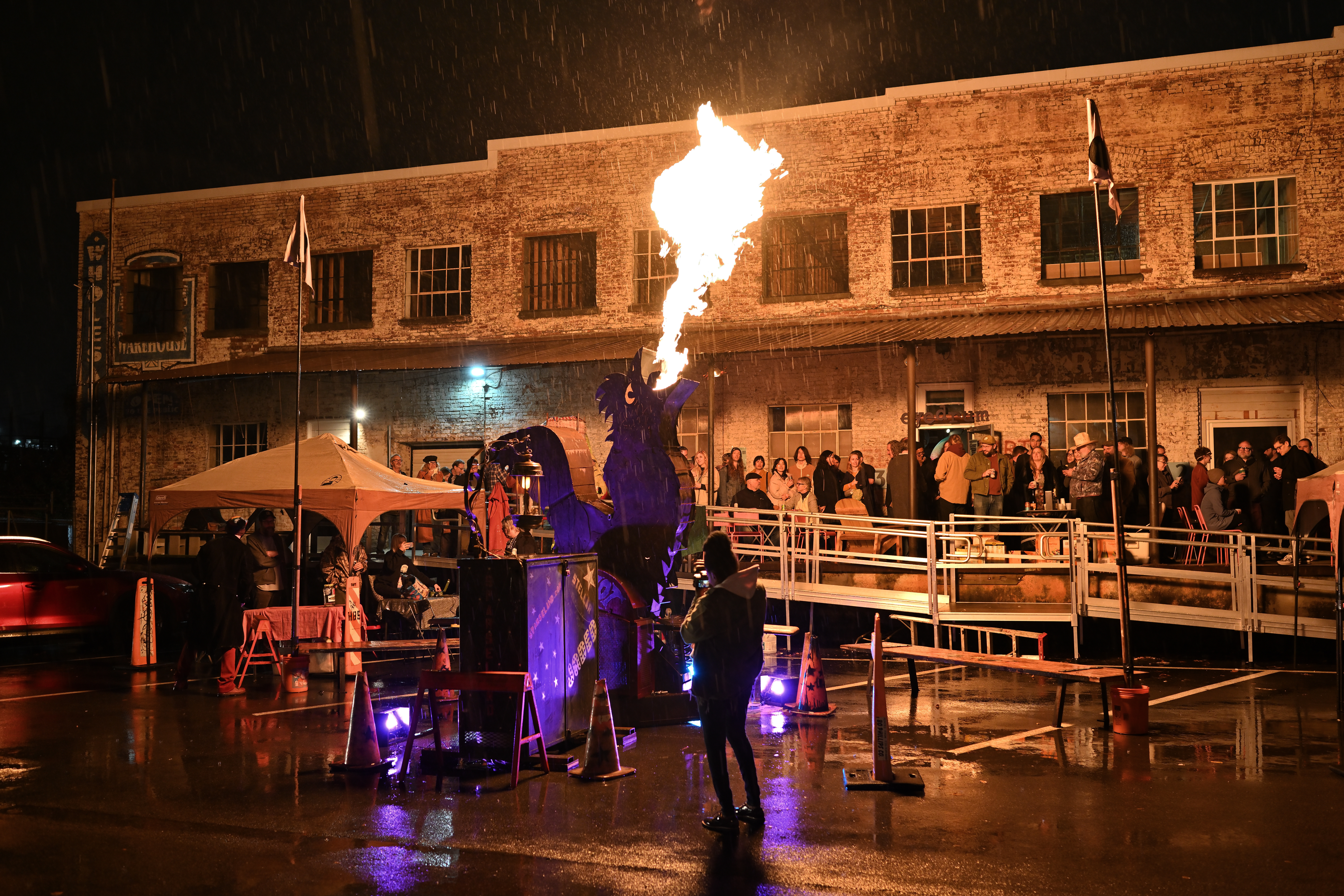
Eyedrum's current location since 2020, 515 Ralph David Abernathy BLVD SW, Suite A3, Atlanta GA 30312

Eyedrum Art & Music Gallery is a non-profit art space and venue in Atlanta, Georgia, founded in 1998, and is focused on contemporary art, Film, Literary arts, and experimental music ranging from contemporary chamber music and sound sculpture to drone noise music and art rock. Until January 1, 2010, the organization was located in the Old Fourth Ward district and had three art gallery spaces and one space for music and performance. It hosted approximately 180 events yearly. Eyedrum celebrated its 25th birthday in 2023 and is one of the longest-running art and performance spaces in . Eyedrum's current home is in Fulton County in southwest Atlanta at 515 Ralph David Abernathy BLVD SW, Suite A3, Atlanta GA 30312.
