= Benjamin Smoke =

Benjamin

Background information
- Also known as: Benjamin
- Born: Robert Dickerson; January 28, 1960
- Origin: Atlanta, Georgia, U.S.
- Died: January 29, 1999 (aged 39)
- Genres: Punk rock; Indie rock
- Instruments: Vocals, Bass
- Years active: 1970s–1990s
- Formerly of: Smoke; Opal Foxx Quartet

Robert Dickerson (January 28, 1960 – January 29, 1999), better known as Benjamin, was an American poet and singer-songwriter who fronted the Atlanta, Georgia bands Smoke and the Opal Foxx Quartet. He was noted for being a radical rock 'n' roll performer. He died on January 29, 1999, due to liver failure caused by Hepatitis C at age 39. He performed his final concert in Atlanta, Georgia on New Year's Eve, 1998.

== Biography ==
Benjamin lived for many years in Cabbagetown, an "unsafe" Atlanta neighborhood peopled with hustlers and eccentrics. Growing up, he occasionally dressed in drag from a young age. When he was nine years old, he would appear in public wearing women's clothing, "with a towel on my head like Whoopi (Goldberg), going to the Waffle House in a dress." In New York City, he found work at the downtown club CBGB. He earned $20 a day, his duties consisted of sweeping up broken glass left by performers and audiences the evening prior. He later described the club as "the filthiest place I ever was."

Benjamin was a well-known character in the 1980s Atlanta underground scene and participated in a number of local experimental projects including Easturn Stars, Monroe is Naked Again, Summer Complaint, Freedom Puff, and Blade Emotion. His bands played in such venues as 688, Celebrity Club, and Pillowtex, among others; and the Destroy All Music Festival. In the Opal Foxx Quartet (which often had up to 12 members). Benjamin donned the stage name "Miss Opal Foxx." During this time his vocals received media attention and comparisons to Tom Waits. His voice has been described as "resembling the roar of a wounded lion".

Benjamin also had a notable stage presence and charisma. As described in the Brooklyn Academy of Music blog: "Donning a frayed, cotton dress and a shabby beehive wig, she drags on her cigarette and teases the audience with intermittent flashes of skin, if only they will pay for a glimpse. Ms. Opal Foxx, né Robert Dickerson, queen of a thriving, close-knit music scene in Cabbagetown, a former mill town in Atlanta, Georgia..." In a review of the Benjamin Smoke documentary, A.O. Scott of the New York Times wrote, "...a wispy, sensitive, self-destructive soul full of sweet beatnik romanticism, pop poetry and entertaining nonsense... Mr. Dickerson, bone thin, his voice ravaged by ill health and cigarettes, has a hustler's easy charm."

After some of the musicians of the group died, the band Smoke was conceived in 1992 with members Bill Taft, Brian Halloran, and Todd Butler. Coleman Lewis and Tim Campion later joined the band, followed by Will Fratesi. Benjamin was renowned for his onstage banter, never shying away from provoking his audience: "For a faggot, do I have a rockin' band or what?"

Shortly before he died, Benjamin opened for Patti Smith at a concert in 1997.

Benjamin was an amphetamine addict and he also had AIDS, though he claimed "HIV is not a death sentence". AIDS brought him closer to his mother, though he eventually lost his life due to liver failure, caused by Hepatitis C.

== Discography ==
- Jesus Christ Superstar: A Resurrection CD (1994, Daemon Records)
- RARA - House of the Rising Sun 7" (1994)
- LowLife 17 12" w/Freedom Puff (bass only)

=== Opal Foxx Quartet ===
The Love That Won't Shut Up CD (1994, LongPlay Records)

=== Freedom Puff ===
- LowLife 17 (vinyl-only compilation)
- Visiting with the White Rock Girl
- 2 Dixie Cups and a String

=== Smoke ===
- Pretend/Dirt 7" (1993, Colossal Records)
- Another Reason To Fast CD (1995, LongPlay Records)
- Heaven on a Popsicle Stick CD (1994, LongPlay Records)

=== Bands ===
- Smoke
- Opal Foxx Quartet
- Baby Weemus
- Freedom Puff
- Easturn Stars
- Medicine Suite
- Knee Deep in Okra
- Beatrice

== Filmography ==
Benjamin was the subject of a documentary released in 2000 called Benjamin Smoke directed by Jem Cohen and Peter Sillen, filming for which took 10 years. The New York Times and Contactmusic.com criticised the film for not providing much detail about Benjamin's life.
