= DQE (band) =

Musical group

DQE, or Dairy Queen Empire, is a band formed by singer/songwriter Grace Braun, New York photographer Chris Verene and former Fat Day drummer Zak Sitter in 1986 in Atlanta. The band later evolved into one built around the core of Grace Braun (renamed Anna Trodglen) and her husband/drummer, music writer Dugan Trodglen. Past contributors include Justin Hughes, and a present member of the band is John Armstrong.

== Discography ==
Singles

- Hot Dog (1991 - Old Gold Records)
- Masturbation Made a Mess Out of Me (1992 - Feel Good All Over Records)
- Tell Me Why The Ivy Twines (1994 - Colossal Records)

LPs

- But Me, I Fell Down (1994 - Feel Good All Over Records)
- Jump On In (1995 - Making Of Americans Records)
- DQE & Jad Fair, self-titled collaboration (1996 -Dark Beloved Cloud Records, DBC205)
- The Queen of Mean (2000 Dark Beloved Cloud Records, DBC229)
- I'm Your Girl (2002 - DQE and Grace Braun double CD (disk 1 Grace Braun, disk 2 DQE) on Dark Beloved Cloud Records, DBC237)

Cassettes

- N Is For Knowledge (1990 - Self-released)
- Hershymouth (1990 - Old Gold Records)
- Pictures of Cliffs
- Old Gold
- Ride This Ride (released on Certron cassettes)

As Grace Braun

- It Won't Hurt (1996 - Slow River Records)
- The Gabrielle Tapes 2005, self-released CD of Nick Drake and Jackson C. Frank covers.

== Compilations ==
- Low Life 7 inch containing one DQE song, "In One Ear Out The Other" released in conjunction with Low Life Magazine (Publisher: Glen Thrasher)
- Low Life 12 inch containing two DQE songs, "Burning From The Inside Out" & "Carnival"
