= A Fazenda 14 =

- Season 14
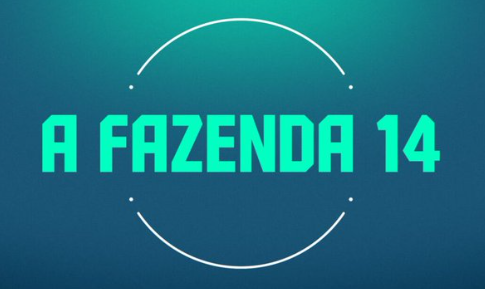
- Hosted by: Adriane Galisteu
- No. of days: 96
- No. of contestants: 21
- Winner: Bárbara Borges
- Runner-up: Bia Miranda
- Companion show: A Fazenda Online
- No. of episodes: 94

Release
- Original network: RecordTV
- Original release: September 13 – December 15, 2022

Season chronology
- ← Previous; Season 13 Next → Season 15

A Fazenda 14 was the fourteenth season of the Brazilian reality television series A Fazenda, which premiered Tuesday, September 13, 2022, at 11:00 / 10:00 p.m. (BRT / AMT) on RecordTV, following a sneak peek episode that aired on September 12.

On December 15, 2022, actress Bárbara Borges won the competition with 61.14% of the public vote over dancer Bia Miranda (35.03%) and actor Iran Malfitano (3.83%).

== Overview ==
=== Development ===
Adriane Galisteu returned for her second season as the main host, alongside Lucas Selfie as the show's online host and correspondent.

Like the previous seasons, the contestants moved into the Farm on Sunday, September 11, 2022, two days before the season premiere.

== Contestants ==
Contestant	Age	Background	Hometown	Entered	Exited	Status	Finish
Bruno Tálamo	33	Journalist	São Paulo	Day 1	Day 12	Eliminated 1st on September 22, 2022	21st
Ingrid Ohara	25	Digital influencer & TV host	Belém	Day 1	Day 19	Eliminated 2nd on September 29, 2022	20th
Rosiane Pinheiro	48	Dancer	Salvador	Day 1	Day 26	Eliminated 3rd on October 6, 2022	19th
Tati Zaqui	28	Singer	São Caetano do Sul	Day 1	Day 33	Eliminated 4th on October 13, 2022	18th
Thomaz Costa	22	Actor	São Paulo	Day 1	Day 40	Eliminated 5th on October 20, 2022	17th
Tiago Ramos	24	Football player & model	Taguatinga	Day 1	Day 41	Ejected on October 21, 2022	16th/15th
Shayan Haghbin	31	Entrepreneur	Tehran, Iran	Day 1	Day 41	Ejected on October 21, 2022	16th/15th
Vini Büttel	31	Model & cinematographer	Petrópolis	Day 1	Day 47	Eliminated 6th on October 27, 2022	14th
Lucas Santos	22	Actor & singer	São Paulo	Day 1	Day 54	Eliminated 7th on November 3, 2022	13th
Alex Gallete	33	Actor & TV host	Aracaju	Day 1	Day 61	Eliminated 8th on November 10, 2022	12th/11th
Deborah Albuquerque	37	Actress	São Paulo	Day 1	Day 61	Eliminated 9th on November 10, 2022	12th/11th
Ruivinha de Marte	26	Singer & comedian	Urucará	Day 1	Day 68	Eliminated 10th on November 17, 2022	10th
Kerline Cardoso	30	Digital influencer	Fortaleza	Day 1	Day 75	Eliminated 11th on November 24, 2022	9th
Deolane Bezerra	34	Lawyer	Vitória de Santo Antão	Day 1	Day 85	Walked on December 4, 2022	8th
Pétala Barreiros	23	Digital influencer	Ribeirão Preto	Day 1	Day 86	Walked on December 5, 2022	7th
Moranguinho	41	Dancer	São Paulo	Day 1	Day 89	Eliminated 12th on December 8, 2022	6th
André Marinho	43	Singer	Rio de Janeiro	Day 1	Day 93	Eliminated 13th on December 12, 2022	5th
Pelé Milflows	23	Rapper	São Gonçalo	Day 1	Day 94	Eliminated 14th on December 13, 2022	4th
Iran Malfitano	40	Actor	Belo Horizonte	Day 1	Day 96	Third place on December 15, 2022	3rd
Bia Miranda	18	Dancer & model	Rio de Janeiro	Day 5	Day 96	Runner-up on December 15, 2022	2nd
Bárbara Borges	43	Actress	Rio de Janeiro	Day 1	Day 96	Winner on December 15, 2022	1st

== Future Appearances ==
In 2023, Bruno Tálamo appeared on A Grande Conquista 1, he received enough votes to enter in the game, Bruno finished the game in 14th place.

In 2023, Shayan Haghbin appeared in A Fazenda 15, he finished in 8th place in the competition.

== The game ==
=== The Warehouse ===
On Day 2, five additional contestants entered the Warehouse where the public voted for one of them to move into the main House on Day 5.

Contestant	Age	Background	Hometown	Entered	Exited	Status	Finish
**Suzi Sassaki**	26	Actress & model	Iturama	Day 2	Day 5	Not Selected on September 15, 2022	5th
**André Santos**	39	Former football player	São Paulo	Day 2	Day 5	Not Selected on September 15, 2022	4th
**MC Créu**	44	DJ & singer	Rio de Janeiro	Day 2	Day 5	Not Selected on September 15, 2022	3rd
**Claudia Baronesa**	48	Businesswoman	São Paulo	Day 2	Day 5	Not Selected on September 15, 2022	2nd
**Bia Miranda**	18	Dancer & model	Rio de Janeiro	Day 2	Day 5	Selected on September 15, 2022	1st

=== Fire challenge ===
Each week, contestants (determined by a random draw) compete in the Fire challenge to win the Lamp power. The Lamp power entitles the holder two flames (black and green or red and yellow), which may unleash good or bad consequences on the nomination process, with the green/red flame power defined by the public through the R7.com website among two options.

The winner chooses a flame for himself and delegates which contestant holds the other. The Flame holder's choice is marked in bold.

Week		Players	Winner	Sent to the Stall	Consequences
1	Day 1	(none)		André M., Bruno, Thomaz, Vini (selected from the House)	All contestants in the Stall are banned from competing in the first Farmer challenge.
1	Day 8	Iran	Iran	**Shayan**, Moranguinho, Deborah, Bruno	Iran: The holder must start the Save Chain in order to determine this week's fourth nominee.; André M.: The holder must cancel the votes of three contestants who in turn must nominate a different contestant → **Bruno**, **Deborah**, **Kerline**.
1	Day 8	Shayan	Iran	**Shayan**, Moranguinho, Deborah, Bruno	Iran: The holder must start the Save Chain in order to determine this week's fourth nominee.; André M.: The holder must cancel the votes of three contestants who in turn must nominate a different contestant → **Bruno**, **Deborah**, **Kerline**.
2		Deolane	Deolane	**Rosiane**, Ingrid, Kerline, Ruivinha	Pétala: The holder must choose a contestant from the Stall to receive immunity from being the third nominee → **Rosiane**.; Deolane: The holder must pass all the votes that any contestant received (**Bia**) to another contestant (**Deborah**).
2		Rosiane	Deolane	**Rosiane**, Ingrid, Kerline, Ruivinha	Pétala: The holder must choose a contestant from the Stall to receive immunity from being the third nominee → **Rosiane**.; Deolane: The holder must pass all the votes that any contestant received (**Bia**) to another contestant (**Deborah**).
3		Iran	Iran	**Kerline**, **Pétala**, Bia, ~~Bárbara~~, Deborah	Iran: The holder must choose between **having the vote count as two** or winning R$5.000 and nullify him vote.; André M.: The holder must swap a contestant in the Stall for another contestant in the House → **Bárbara** for **Deborah**.
3		Kerline	Iran	**Kerline**, **Pétala**, Bia, ~~Bárbara~~, Deborah	Iran: The holder must choose between **having the vote count as two** or winning R$5.000 and nullify him vote.; André M.: The holder must swap a contestant in the Stall for another contestant in the House → **Bárbara** for **Deborah**.
3		Pétala	Iran	**Kerline**, **Pétala**, Bia, ~~Bárbara~~, Deborah	Iran: The holder must choose between **having the vote count as two** or winning R$5.000 and nullify him vote.; André M.: The holder must swap a contestant in the Stall for another contestant in the House → **Bárbara** for **Deborah**.
4		Bárbara	Pelé	**Moranguinho**, **Bárbara**, **Deolane**, **Ruivinha**	Pelé: **Canceled/Undisclosed** (Pelé broke the rule by reading the contents of the Flame during the vote without being authorized).; Kerline: The holder must choose a contestant from the Stall to be eligible for the House's vote → **Deolane**.
4		Deolane	Pelé	**Moranguinho**, **Bárbara**, **Deolane**, **Ruivinha**	Pelé: **Canceled/Undisclosed** (Pelé broke the rule by reading the contents of the Flame during the vote without being authorized).; Kerline: The holder must choose a contestant from the Stall to be eligible for the House's vote → **Deolane**.
4		Moranguinho	Pelé	**Moranguinho**, **Bárbara**, **Deolane**, **Ruivinha**	Pelé: **Canceled/Undisclosed** (Pelé broke the rule by reading the contents of the Flame during the vote without being authorized).; Kerline: The holder must choose a contestant from the Stall to be eligible for the House's vote → **Deolane**.
4		Pelé	Pelé	**Moranguinho**, **Bárbara**, **Deolane**, **Ruivinha**	Pelé: **Canceled/Undisclosed** (Pelé broke the rule by reading the contents of the Flame during the vote without being authorized).; Kerline: The holder must choose a contestant from the Stall to be eligible for the House's vote → **Deolane**.
4		Ruivinha	Pelé	**Moranguinho**, **Bárbara**, **Deolane**, **Ruivinha**	Pelé: **Canceled/Undisclosed** (Pelé broke the rule by reading the contents of the Flame during the vote without being authorized).; Kerline: The holder must choose a contestant from the Stall to be eligible for the House's vote → **Deolane**.
4		Shayan	Pelé	**Moranguinho**, **Bárbara**, **Deolane**, **Ruivinha**	Pelé: **Canceled/Undisclosed** (Pelé broke the rule by reading the contents of the Flame during the vote without being authorized).; Kerline: The holder must choose a contestant from the Stall to be eligible for the House's vote → **Deolane**.
4		Tati	Pelé	**Moranguinho**, **Bárbara**, **Deolane**, **Ruivinha**	Pelé: **Canceled/Undisclosed** (Pelé broke the rule by reading the contents of the Flame during the vote without being authorized).; Kerline: The holder must choose a contestant from the Stall to be eligible for the House's vote → **Deolane**.
4		Vini	Pelé	**Moranguinho**, **Bárbara**, **Deolane**, **Ruivinha**	Pelé: **Canceled/Undisclosed** (Pelé broke the rule by reading the contents of the Flame during the vote without being authorized).; Kerline: The holder must choose a contestant from the Stall to be eligible for the House's vote → **Deolane**.
5		Alex	André M.	**Alex**, **Lucas**, **Thomaz**, Tiago	André M.: The holder must swap the nominee banned from the Farmer's challenge for another nominee → **Shayan** for **Thomaz**.; Deolane: The holder must choose any contestant from the Stall to be the third nominee → **Thomaz**.
5		André M.	André M.	**Alex**, **Lucas**, **Thomaz**, Tiago	André M.: The holder must swap the nominee banned from the Farmer's challenge for another nominee → **Shayan** for **Thomaz**.; Deolane: The holder must choose any contestant from the Stall to be the third nominee → **Thomaz**.
5		Lucas	André M.	**Alex**, **Lucas**, **Thomaz**, Tiago	André M.: The holder must swap the nominee banned from the Farmer's challenge for another nominee → **Shayan** for **Thomaz**.; Deolane: The holder must choose any contestant from the Stall to be the third nominee → **Thomaz**.
5		Thomaz	André M.	**Alex**, **Lucas**, **Thomaz**, Tiago	André M.: The holder must swap the nominee banned from the Farmer's challenge for another nominee → **Shayan** for **Thomaz**.; Deolane: The holder must choose any contestant from the Stall to be the third nominee → **Thomaz**.
6		Bia	Kerline	**Bia**, **Deolane**, **Pétala**, Alex	Kerline: The holder is immune this week.; Pétala: The holder is this week's third nominee. If she is already nominated, she must choose the replacement.
6		Deolane	Kerline	**Bia**, **Deolane**, **Pétala**, Alex	Kerline: The holder is immune this week.; Pétala: The holder is this week's third nominee. If she is already nominated, she must choose the replacement.
6		Kerline	Kerline	**Bia**, **Deolane**, **Pétala**, Alex	Kerline: The holder is immune this week.; Pétala: The holder is this week's third nominee. If she is already nominated, she must choose the replacement.
6		Pétala	Kerline	**Bia**, **Deolane**, **Pétala**, Alex	Kerline: The holder is immune this week.; Pétala: The holder is this week's third nominee. If she is already nominated, she must choose the replacement.
7		Alex	Deborah	**Alex**, **Iran**, **Lucas**, **Ruivinha**	Bárbara: The holder's vote will be counted as two.; Deborah: The holder must cancel the votes of two contestants → **Deolane**, **Pétala**.
7		Deborah	Deborah	**Alex**, **Iran**, **Lucas**, **Ruivinha**	Bárbara: The holder's vote will be counted as two.; Deborah: The holder must cancel the votes of two contestants → **Deolane**, **Pétala**.
7		Iran	Deborah	**Alex**, **Iran**, **Lucas**, **Ruivinha**	Bárbara: The holder's vote will be counted as two.; Deborah: The holder must cancel the votes of two contestants → **Deolane**, **Pétala**.
7		Lucas	Deborah	**Alex**, **Iran**, **Lucas**, **Ruivinha**	Bárbara: The holder's vote will be counted as two.; Deborah: The holder must cancel the votes of two contestants → **Deolane**, **Pétala**.
7		Moranguinho	Deborah	**Alex**, **Iran**, **Lucas**, **Ruivinha**	Bárbara: The holder's vote will be counted as two.; Deborah: The holder must cancel the votes of two contestants → **Deolane**, **Pétala**.
7		Ruivinha	Deborah	**Alex**, **Iran**, **Lucas**, **Ruivinha**	Bárbara: The holder's vote will be counted as two.; Deborah: The holder must cancel the votes of two contestants → **Deolane**, **Pétala**.
8		André M.	Pétala	**André M.**, **Kerline**, Ruivinha, Deolane	Pétala: The holder must choose any contestant to be the fifth nominee. The fifth nominee must ban one more nominee from competing in the Farmer challenge → **Deborah**.; Deolane: The holder must start the Save Chain in order to determine this week's fourth nominee.
8		Kerline	Pétala	**André M.**, **Kerline**, Ruivinha, Deolane	Pétala: The holder must choose any contestant to be the fifth nominee. The fifth nominee must ban one more nominee from competing in the Farmer challenge → **Deborah**.; Deolane: The holder must start the Save Chain in order to determine this week's fourth nominee.
8		Pétala	Pétala	**André M.**, **Kerline**, Ruivinha, Deolane	Pétala: The holder must choose any contestant to be the fifth nominee. The fifth nominee must ban one more nominee from competing in the Farmer challenge → **Deborah**.; Deolane: The holder must start the Save Chain in order to determine this week's fourth nominee.
9		Iran	Iran	**Moranguinho**, **Pelé**, Kerline, Pétala	Iran: The holder is immune from the House's vote.; Pelé: The holder must exchange the third nominee for any other contestant → **Pétala** for **Bia**.
9		Moranguinho	Iran	**Moranguinho**, **Pelé**, Kerline, Pétala	Iran: The holder is immune from the House's vote.; Pelé: The holder must exchange the third nominee for any other contestant → **Pétala** for **Bia**.
9		Pelé	Iran	**Moranguinho**, **Pelé**, Kerline, Pétala	Iran: The holder is immune from the House's vote.; Pelé: The holder must exchange the third nominee for any other contestant → **Pétala** for **Bia**.
10		André M.	Pétala	**André M.**, **Kerline**, Bia	Bia: The holder must choose a contestant from the Stall to receive immunity from being the third nominee, except herself → **André M.**; Pétala: The holder wins R$10.000 if he punishes the House with 48 hours without hot water → **offer accepted**.
10		Kerline	Pétala	**André M.**, **Kerline**, Bia	Bia: The holder must choose a contestant from the Stall to receive immunity from being the third nominee, except herself → **André M.**; Pétala: The holder wins R$10.000 if he punishes the House with 48 hours without hot water → **offer accepted**.
10		Pétala	Pétala	**André M.**, **Kerline**, Bia	Bia: The holder must choose a contestant from the Stall to receive immunity from being the third nominee, except herself → **André M.**; Pétala: The holder wins R$10.000 if he punishes the House with 48 hours without hot water → **offer accepted**.
11		Bárbara	Iran	**Bárbara**, **Deolane**, **Pelé**	André M.: The holder must nominate again.; Iran: The holder must swap the nominee banned from the Farmer's challenge for another nominee → **Pelé** for **Pétala**.
11		Deolane	Iran	**Bárbara**, **Deolane**, **Pelé**	André M.: The holder must nominate again.; Iran: The holder must swap the nominee banned from the Farmer's challenge for another nominee → **Pelé** for **Pétala**.
11		Iran	Iran	**Bárbara**, **Deolane**, **Pelé**	André M.: The holder must nominate again.; Iran: The holder must swap the nominee banned from the Farmer's challenge for another nominee → **Pelé** for **Pétala**.
11		Pelé	Iran	**Bárbara**, **Deolane**, **Pelé**	André M.: The holder must nominate again.; Iran: The holder must swap the nominee banned from the Farmer's challenge for another nominee → **Pelé** for **Pétala**.
12		André M.	André M.	**Bia**, **Moranguinho**, ~~**Pétala**~~	Iran: The holder must start the Save Chain in order to determine this week's third nominee.; André M.: The holder must choose any contestant to be the fourth nominee → **Bárbara**.
12		Bárbara	André M.	**Bia**, **Moranguinho**, ~~**Pétala**~~	Iran: The holder must start the Save Chain in order to determine this week's third nominee.; André M.: The holder must choose any contestant to be the fourth nominee → **Bárbara**.
12		Bia	André M.	**Bia**, **Moranguinho**, ~~**Pétala**~~	Iran: The holder must start the Save Chain in order to determine this week's third nominee.; André M.: The holder must choose any contestant to be the fourth nominee → **Bárbara**.
12		Iran	André M.	**Bia**, **Moranguinho**, ~~**Pétala**~~	Iran: The holder must start the Save Chain in order to determine this week's third nominee.; André M.: The holder must choose any contestant to be the fourth nominee → **Bárbara**.
12		Moranguinho	André M.	**Bia**, **Moranguinho**, ~~**Pétala**~~	Iran: The holder must start the Save Chain in order to determine this week's third nominee.; André M.: The holder must choose any contestant to be the fourth nominee → **Bárbara**.
12		Pétala	André M.	**Bia**, **Moranguinho**, ~~**Pétala**~~	Iran: The holder must start the Save Chain in order to determine this week's third nominee.; André M.: The holder must choose any contestant to be the fourth nominee → **Bárbara**.

=== Obligations ===
	Week 1	Week 2	Week 3	Week 4	Week 5	Week 6	Week 7	Week 8	Week 9	Week 10	Week 11	Week 12	Week 13
Farmer of the week	**Lucas**	**Shayan**	**Vini**	**Alex**	**Bia**	**Lucas**	**Pelé**	**Bia**	**Bárbara**	**Deolane**	**Bia**	**Pelé**	**Bárbara**
Cows Bull	Shayan; Tati	Deolane; Lucas	Bárbara; Pelé	Vini; Thomaz	Alex; Kerline	Ruivinha; Deborah	André M. Bia	Iran; Moranguinho	Deolane; Pétala	Bárbara; Kerline	Iran; Pelé	Moranguinho; Bia	Pelé; Iran
Horse	Bruno	Thomaz	Tati	Shayan	Pelé	Kerline	Iran	Bárbara	~~Deborah~~; Ruivinha	André M.	Pétala	~~Deolane~~; ~~Pétala~~; Bárbara	~~Moranguinho~~; Bia
Llamas	Deborah	Tiago	Iran	Kerline	Ruivinha	~~Shayan~~; Vini	Lucas	Alex	Bia	Pétala	Deolane	Bárbara; ~~Moranguinho~~	André M.
Sheep	Rosiane	Deborah	Kerline	Tati	Bárbara	Pelé	Moranguinho	Ruivinha	~~Alex~~; Iran	Bia	André M.	~~Pétala~~; Bia	André M.
Pigs	Alex	Ingrid	André M.	Deborah	Shayan	Iran	~~Vini~~; Ruivinha	~~Lucas~~; Pétala	Pelé	Iran	~~Kerline~~; Bárbara	Iran	Bia
Garden Plants	Pelé	Pétala	Ruivinha	Bia	Iran	Alex	Kerline	Deborah	André M.	Moranguinho	Bárbara	André M.	~~Moranguinho~~; Iran
Birds	Ruivinha	Bia	Alex	Pétala	Thomaz	Bárbara	Deolane	Kerline	Moranguinho	Pelé	André M.	Iran	Bia
Trash	Bárbara	Vini	~~Ingrid~~; Shayan	Tiago	~~Tati~~; Deborah	~~Thomaz~~; André M.	Pétala	Pelé	Kerline	~~Ruivinha~~; Iran	Moranguinho	André M.	Pelé

=== Farmer's ranch ===
Week	Farmer of the week	Guest pawns to the ranch
1	Lucas	Deolane, Pétala, Moranguinho
2	Shayan	Iran, Ruivinha, Deborah
3	Vini	André M., Rosiane, Thomaz
4	Alex	Bárbara, Tati, Kerline
5	Bia	Pétala, Tiago, Deolane
6	Lucas	Moranguinho, Vini, André M.
7	Pelé	Iran, Alex, Deborah
8	Bia	Pétala, Deolane, Moranguinho
9	Bárbara	Iran, Ruivinha, Kerline
10	Deolane	Pétala, Bia, Moranguinho
11	Bia	Moranguinho, Pétala, Deolane
12	Bárbara	Iran, André M.
12	Pelé	(none)
13	Bárbara	(none)

=== Voting history ===
	Week 1		Week 2	Week 3	Week 4	Week 5	Week 6	Week 7	Week 8	Week 9	Week 10	Week 11	Week 12	Week 13		
	Day 2	Day 10	Week 2	Week 3	Week 4	Week 5	Week 6	Week 7	Week 8	Week 9	Week 10	Week 11	Week 12	Day 92	Day 93	Finale
Farmer of the week	(none)	Lucas	Shayan	Vini	Alex	Bia	Lucas	Pelé	Bia	Bárbara	Deolane	Bia	Pelé	Bárbara	(none)	(none)
Nomination (Farmer)	(none)	Deborah	Vini	Alex	Vini	Shayan	Bárbara	Bia	Bárbara	Deolane	Bárbara	Pelé	Bia	(none)	(none)	(none)
Nomination (House)	(none)	Tiago	Deborah	Tiago	Bia	Deolane	Vini	Deolane	Moranguinho	Ruivinha	Moranguinho	Pétala	André M.	(none)	(none)	(none)
Nomination (Stall)	(none)	Bruno	Ingrid	Deborah	Bárbara	(none)		Iran	Ruivinha	~~Pétala~~; Bia	Kerline	Bárbara	(none)	(none)	(none)	(none)
Nomination (Twist)	(none)	Shayan	Rosiane	Rosiane	Tati	Thomaz; Lucas	Pétala; Pelé	Lucas	Alex; Deborah	André M.	Bia	Deolane	Moranguinho; Bárbara	André M. Bárbara; Bia; Iran	Bárbara; Bia; Iran; Pelé	(none)
Bárbara	Not eligible	Tiago	Pétala	Tiago	Bia	Deolane	Vini	Deolane (x2)	Moranguinho	Farmer of the week	Moranguinho	Pétala	André M.	Nominee	Nominee	**Winner** (Day 96)
Bia	Warehouse	Kerline	Deborah	Shayan	Shayan	Farmer of the week	Deborah	Kerline	Farmer of the week	Ruivinha	Iran	Farmer of the week	André M.	Nominee	Nominee	**Runner-up** (Day 96)
Iran	Not eligible	Vini	~~Bia~~; Deborah	Tiago (x2)	Bia	Deolane	Vini	Deolane	Moranguinho	Bia	Moranguinho	Pétala	André M.	Nominee	Nominee	**Third place** (Day 96)
Pelé	Not eligible	Tiago	~~Bia~~; Deborah	Tiago	Bia	Deolane	Vini	Farmer of the week	Moranguinho	Bia	Moranguinho	Pétala	Farmer of the week	Exempt	Nominee	Evicted (Day 94)
André M.	Not eligible	Tiago	Deborah	Shayan	Shayan	Ruivinha	Deborah	Kerline	Deborah	Ruivinha	Moranguinho	Pétala; Pétala	Bárbara	Nominee	Evicted (Day 93)	
Moranguinho	Not eligible	Kerline	Deborah	Shayan	Shayan	Ruivinha	Deborah	Bárbara	Deborah	Ruivinha	Iran	Iran	André M.	Evicted (Day 89)		
Pétala	Not eligible	Kerline	Deborah	Shayan	Shayan	Ruivinha	Deborah	~~Kerline~~	Iran	Ruivinha	Iran	Iran	Walked (Day 86)			
Deolane	Not eligible	Kerline	Deborah	Shayan	Shayan	Ruivinha	Deborah	~~Kerline~~	Deborah	Ruivinha	Farmer of the week	Iran	Walked (Day 85)			
Kerline	Not eligible	~~Tiago~~; Deolane	~~Bia~~; Deborah	Tiago	Bia	Deolane	Vini	Deolane	Moranguinho	Bia	Moranguinho	Evicted (Day 75)				
Ruivinha	Not eligible	Tiago	Pétala	Tiago	Bia	Deolane	Vini	Deolane	Moranguinho	Bia	Evicted (Day 68)					
Deborah	Not eligible	~~Deolane~~; Thomaz	Deolane	Tiago	Bia	Deolane	Vini	Deolane	Moranguinho	Evicted (Day 61)						
Alex	Not eligible	Tiago	Tiago	Tiago	Farmer of the week	Deolane	Vini	Deolane	Moranguinho	Evicted (Day 61)						
Lucas	Not eligible	Farmer of the week	Deborah	Shayan	Shayan	Ruivinha	Farmer of the week	Kerline	Evicted (Day 54)							
Vini	Not eligible	Kerline	Deborah	Farmer of the week	Shayan	Ruivinha	Deborah	Evicted (Day 47)								
Shayan	Not eligible	Tiago	Farmer of the week	Tiago	Bia	Deolane	Ejected (Day 41)									
Tiago	Not eligible	Kerline	Deborah	Shayan	Shayan	Ruivinha	Ejected (Day 41)									
Thomaz	Not eligible	Kerline	Deborah	Shayan	Bia	Deolane	Evicted (Day 40)									
Tati	Not eligible	Tiago	~~Bia~~; Deborah	Tiago	Bia	Evicted (Day 33)										
Rosiane	Not eligible	Tiago	Deborah	Shayan	Evicted (Day 26)											
Ingrid	Not eligible	Tiago	Thomaz	Evicted (Day 19)												
Bruno	Not eligible	~~Thomaz~~; Alex	Evicted (Day 12)													
Baronesa	Warehouse	Evicted (Day 5)														
Créu	Warehouse	Evicted (Day 5)														
André S.	Warehouse	Evicted (Day 5)														
Suzi	Warehouse	Evicted (Day 5)														
Notes	1	2, 3, 4	5, 6, 7	8, 9	10	11, 12, 13	14, 15, 16, 17	18, 19, 20	21, 22	23, 24, 25	26, 27	28, 29, 30, 31	32, 33, 34	35	36	37
Up for nomination	(none)	Deborah; Tiago; Bruno; Shayan	Vini; Deborah; Ingrid; Rosiane	Alex; Tiago; Deborah; Rosiane	Vini; Bia; Bárbara; Tati	Shayan; Deolane; Thomaz; Lucas	Bárbara; Vini; Pétala; Pelé	Bia; Deolane; Iran; Lucas	Bárbara; Moranguinho; Ruivinha; Alex; Deborah	Deolane; Ruivinha; Bia; André M.	Bárbara; Moranguinho; Kerline; Bia	Pelé; Pétala; Bárbara; Deolane	Bia; André M. Moranguinho; Bárbara	(none)		
Farmer winner	(none)	Shayan	Vini	Alex	Bia	Lucas	Pelé	Bia	Bárbara	Deolane	Bia	Pelé	Bárbara	(none)		
Nominated for eviction	André S. Baronesa; Bia; Créu; Suzi	Bruno; Deborah; Tiago	Deborah; Ingrid; Rosiane	Deborah; Rosiane; Tiago	Bárbara; Tati; Vini	Deolane; Shayan; Thomaz	Bárbara; Pétala; Vini	Deolane; Iran; Lucas	Alex; Deborah; Moranguinho; Ruivinha	André M. Bia; Ruivinha	Bárbara; Kerline; Moranguinho	Bárbara; Deolane; Pétala	André M. Bia; Moranguinho	André M. Bárbara; Bia; Iran	Bárbara; Bia; Iran; Pelé	Bárbara; Bia; Iran
Ejected	(none)						**Tiago**; **Shayan**	(none)					(none)	(none)		
Walked	(none)						(none)	(none)					**Deolane**; **Pétala**	(none)		
Evicted	**Suzi**; 1.56% to enter	**Bruno**; 15.69% to save	**Ingrid**; 29.01% to save	**Rosiane**; 21.28% to save	**Tati**; 27.70% to save	**Thomaz**; 17.31% to save	**Vini**; 21.14% to save	**Lucas**; 15.39% to save	**Alex**; 11.00% to save	**Ruivinha**; 24.58% to save	**Kerline**; 23.18% to save	**Bárbara**; 52.32% to move	**Moranguinho**; 13.04% to save	**André M.** 3.49% to save	**Pelé**; 5.88% to save	**Iran**; 3.83% to win
Evicted	**André S.** 6.24% to enter	**Bruno**; 15.69% to save	**Ingrid**; 29.01% to save	**Rosiane**; 21.28% to save	**Tati**; 27.70% to save	**Thomaz**; 17.31% to save	**Vini**; 21.14% to save	**Lucas**; 15.39% to save	**Alex**; 11.00% to save	**Ruivinha**; 24.58% to save	**Kerline**; 23.18% to save	**Bárbara**; 52.32% to move	**Moranguinho**; 13.04% to save	**André M.** 3.49% to save	**Pelé**; 5.88% to save	**Iran**; 3.83% to win
Evicted	**Créu**; 19.01% to enter	**Bruno**; 15.69% to save	**Ingrid**; 29.01% to save	**Rosiane**; 21.28% to save	**Tati**; 27.70% to save	**Thomaz**; 17.31% to save	**Vini**; 21.14% to save	**Lucas**; 15.39% to save	**Deborah**; 23.19% to save	**Ruivinha**; 24.58% to save	**Kerline**; 23.18% to save	**Bárbara**; 52.32% to move	**Moranguinho**; 13.04% to save	**André M.** 3.49% to save	**Pelé**; 5.88% to save	**Bia**; 35.03% to win
Evicted	**Baronesa**; 36.54% to enter	**Bruno**; 15.69% to save	**Ingrid**; 29.01% to save	**Rosiane**; 21.28% to save	**Tati**; 27.70% to save	**Thomaz**; 17.31% to save	**Vini**; 21.14% to save	**Lucas**; 15.39% to save	**Deborah**; 23.19% to save	**Ruivinha**; 24.58% to save	**Kerline**; 23.18% to save	**Bárbara**; 52.32% to move	**Moranguinho**; 13.04% to save	**André M.** 3.49% to save	**Pelé**; 5.88% to save	**Bia**; 35.03% to win
Survived	**Bia**; 36.65% to enter	**Deborah**; 27.23% to save	**Deborah**; 32.30% to save	**Tiago**; 27.27% to save	**Bárbara**; 28.97% to save	**Shayan**; 36.72% to save	**Pétala**; 25.40% to save	**Deolane**; 32.12% to save	**Ruivinha**; 23.95% to save	**André M.** 35.58% to save	**Moranguinho**; 37.37% to save	**Deolane**; 47.26% to move	**Bia**; 33.58% to save	**Bárbara**; Most votes to save	**Bárbara**; Most votes to save	**Bárbara**; 61.14% to win
Survived	**Bia**; 36.65% to enter	**Deborah**; 27.23% to save	**Deborah**; 32.30% to save	**Tiago**; 27.27% to save	**Bárbara**; 28.97% to save	**Shayan**; 36.72% to save	**Pétala**; 25.40% to save	**Deolane**; 32.12% to save	**Ruivinha**; 23.95% to save	**André M.** 35.58% to save	**Moranguinho**; 37.37% to save	**Deolane**; 47.26% to move	**Bia**; 33.58% to save	**Bia**; Most votes to save	**Bia**; Most votes to save	**Bárbara**; 61.14% to win
Survived	**Bia**; 36.65% to enter	**Tiago**; 57.08% to save	**Rosiane**; 38.69% to save	**Deborah**; 51.45% to save	**Vini**; 43.33% to save	**Deolane**; 45.97% to save	**Bárbara**; 53.46% to save	**Iran**; 52.49% to save	**Moranguinho**; 41.86% to save	**Bia**; 39.84% to save	**Bárbara**; 39.45% to save	**Pétala**; 0.42% to move	**André M.** 53.38% to save	**Bia**; Most votes to save	**Bia**; Most votes to save	**Bárbara**; 61.14% to win
Survived	**Bia**; 36.65% to enter	**Tiago**; 57.08% to save	**Rosiane**; 38.69% to save	**Deborah**; 51.45% to save	**Vini**; 43.33% to save	**Deolane**; 45.97% to save	**Bárbara**; 53.46% to save	**Iran**; 52.49% to save	**Moranguinho**; 41.86% to save	**Bia**; 39.84% to save	**Bárbara**; 39.45% to save	**Pétala**; 0.42% to move	**André M.** 53.38% to save	**Iran**; Most votes to save	**Iran**; Most votes to save	**Bárbara**; 61.14% to win

==== Notes ====
- **^Note 1**: André Santos, Baronesa, Bia, Créu and Suzi entered the Warehouse live on day 2 during the special sneak peek episode that aired on September 12. On day 2, the public began to vote for one of them to enter in the game. Bia received the most votes and moved into the main house on day 5. In addition, she received immunity for the nominations on week 1.
- **^Note 2**: On day 4, Pelé won immunity for the first nominations by winning the first Farmer challenge alongside Lucas. They both had to decide which one would receive immunity and which one would become de first Farmer of the season.
- **^Note 3**: Red flame power holder André Marinho had to cancel three votes made by other contestants, who would have to vote again. Bruno's vote went from Thomaz to Alex, Deborah's vote went from Deolane to Thomaz and Kerline's vote went from Tiago to Deolane.
- **^Note 4**: Yellow flame power holder Iran was asked to save someone and so on until only one contestant left, a dinamic called the Save Chain. He saved Bárbara, who saved André Marinho, who saved Pétala, who saved Deolane, who saved Thomaz, who saved Vini, who saved Moranguinho, who saved Rosiane, who saved Alex, who saved Kerline, who saved Tati, who saved Ingrid, who saved Ruivinha, leaving Shayan nominated. Shayan was then asked to ban one of the other three nominees from competing in the Farmer challenge, thus going straight to the public vote. He chose Tiago.
- **^Note 5**: Red flame power holder Deolane chose to pass all 4 votes Bia received to Deborah, increasing her nominations total to 14, thus making her the second nominee.
- **^Note 6**: Yellow flame power holder Pétala had to choose a contestant to receive immunity from being the third nominee. She chose Rosiane.
- **^Note 7**: As the third nominee, Ingrid had to start the Save Chain in order to determine the fourth nominee. She saved Ruivinha, who saved Kerline, who saved Alex, who saved Tati, who saved Pelé, who saved Bárbara, who saved Iran, who saved André Marinho, who saved Moranguinho, who saved Pétala, who saved Deolane, who saved Lucas, who saved Thomaz, who saved Tiago, who saved Bia, leaving Rosiane nominated. Rosiane was then asked to ban one of the other three nominees from competing in the Farmer challenge, thus going straight to the public vote. She chose Deborah.
- **^Note 8**: Black flame power holder Iran had his vote count as two. He voted for Tiago and, because of his double vote, Tiago received one more vote compared to Shayan and was made the second nominee.
- **^Note 9**: As the third nominee, Deborah had to start the Save Chain in order to determine the fourth nominee. She saved Shayan, who saved Ruivinha, who saved Kerline, who saved Tati, who saved Pelé, who saved Bárbara, who saved André Marinho, who saved Iran, who saved Thomaz, who saved Lucas, who saved Deolane, who saved Pétala, who saved Bia, who saved Moranguinho, leaving Rosiane nominated. Rosiane was then asked to ban one of the other three nominees from competing in the Farmer challenge, thus going straight to the public vote. She chose Deborah.
- **^Note 10**: As the third nominee, Bárbara had to start the Save Chain in order to determine the fourth nominee. She saved André Marinho, who saved Iran, who saved Lucas, who saved Deolane, who saved Moranguinho, who saved Pétala, who saved Tiago, who saved Pelé, who saved Deborah, who saved Shayan, who saved Ruivinha, who saved Kerline, who saved Thomaz, leaving Tati nominated. Tati was then asked to ban one of the other three nominees from competing in the Farmer challenge, thus going straight to the public vote. She chose Vini.
- **^Note 11**: Green flame power holder Deolane chose Thomaz to be the third nominee.
- **^Note 12**: As the third nominee, Thomaz had to start the Save Chain in order to determine the fourth nominee. He saved Ruivinha, who saved Kerline, who saved Alex, who saved Bárbara, who saved Deborah, who saved Pelé, who saved Iran, who saved André Marinho, who saved Moranguinho, who saved Pétala, who saved Tiago, who saved Vini, leaving Lucas nominated. Lucas was then asked to ban one of the other three nominees from competing in the Farmer challenge, thus going straight to the public vote. He chose Shayan.
- **^Note 13**: Black flame power holder André Marinho chose to replace Shayan with Thomaz as being banned from competing in the Farmer challenge, thus making Thomaz go straight to the public vote.
- **^Note 14**: Shortly after Thomaz's eviction, both Shayan and Tiago were ejected from the game due to violent behaviour towards each other.
- **^Note 15**: Kerline won immunity for the nominations on week 6 due to the use of her Black flame power.
- **^Note 16**: Before the vote, Fire challenge winner Kerline chose to give the Green flame power to Pétala, which would automatically make her the third nominee.
- **^Note 17**: As the third nominee, Pétala had to start the Save Chain in order to determine the fourth nominee. She saved Deolane, who saved Bia, who saved Moranguinho, who saved André Marinho, who saved Iran, who saved Alex, who saved Deborah, who saved Ruivinha, leaving Pelé nominated. Pelé was then asked to ban one of the other three nominees from competing in the Farmer challenge, thus going straight to the public vote. He chose Vini.
- **^Note 18**: Bárbara's vote on Deolane counted as two due to the use of her Yellow flame power.
- **^Note 19**: Red flame power holder Deborah chose to cancel as the votes Kerline received by Deolane and Pétala, bringing her total to 3.
- **^Note 20**: A different dynamic took place in order to determine the fourth nominee, in which every eligible contestand had to draw a ball from different chests. The red ball meant safety, the white ball meant being nominated, with only the third contestant to draw it becoming effectively nominated, and the purple ball meant having the power to ban one of the four nominees from competing in the Farmer challenge. As the third nominee, Iran chose Bárbara to start the dynamic, who would choose the next one and so on. Bárbara drew a white ball and became temporarily nominated, Alex drew a red ball, Ruivinha drew a red ball, Kerline drew a red ball, Deborah drew a red ball, André Marinho drew a red ball, Moranguinho drew the purple ball, Pétala drew a white ball, replacing Bárbara and becoming temporarily nominated and Lucas drew the third white ball, replacing Pétala and becoming effectively the fourth nominee. Moranguinho then chose to ban Iran from competing in the Farmer challenge, thus sending him straight to the public vote.
- **^Note 21**: Green flame power holder Deolane had to start the Save Chain in order to determine the fourth nominee. She saved Pétala, who saved André Marinho, who saved Iran, who saved Pelé, who saved Deborah, who saved Kerline, leaving Alex nominated. Alex was then asked to ban one of the other three nominees from competing in the Farmer challenge, thus going straight to the public vote. He chose Moranguinho.
- **^Note 22**: Black flame power holder Pétala chose Deborah to be the fifth nominee. Deborah was then asked to ban one of the other three nominees from competing in the Farmer challenge, thus going straight to the public vote. She chose Alex.
- **^Note 23**: Iran won immunity for the House's vote due to the use of his Yellow flame power.
- **^Note 24**: Red flame power holder Pelé had to replace Pétala for another contestant. He chose Bia.
- **^Note 25**: As the third nominee, Bia had to start the Save Chain in order to determine the fourth nominee. She saved Pétala, who saved Moranguinho, who saved Kerline, who saved Pelé, who saved Iran, leaving André Marinho nominated. André Marinho was then asked to ban one of the other three nominees from competing in the Farmer challenge, thus going straight to the public vote. He chose Bia.
- **^Note 26**: Black flame power holder Bia had to choose a contestant to receive immunity from being the third nominee. She chose André Marinho.
- **^Note 27**: As the third nominee, Kerline had to start the Save Chain in order to determine the fourth nominee. She saved Pelé, who saved Iran, who saved André Marinho, who saved Pétala, leaving Bia nominated. Bia was then asked to ban one of the other three nominees from competing in the Farmer challenge, thus going straight to the public vote. She chose Kerline.
- **^Note 28**: Week 11 featured a fake eviction. Bárbara were the most voted contestant by public and moved to Ranch for 2 days. The whole fake eviction were unknown to fellow contestants.
- **^Note 29**: Yellow flame holder André Marinho had to vote again. He chose to vote in Pétala for the second time.
- **^Note 30**: As the third nominee, Bárbara had to start the Save Chain in order to determine the fourth nominee. She saved André Marinho, who saved Iran, who saved Moranguinho, leaving Deolane nominated. Deolane was then asked to ban one of the other three nominees from competing in the Farmer challenge, thus going straight to the public vote. She chose Pelé.
- **^Note 31**: Red flame power holder Iran chose to replace Pelé with Pétala as being banned from competing in the Farmer challenge, thus making Pétala go straight to the public vote.
- **^Note 32**: On day 85, Deolane walked from the game following a family emergency. On day 86, Pétala also walked from the game due to personal reasons.
- **^Note 33**: Yellow flame power holder Iran had to start the Save Chain in order to determine the third nominee. He saved Bárbara, leaving Moranguinho nominated.
- **^Note 34**: Red flame power holder André Marinho chose Bárbara to be the fourth nominee. Bárbara was then asked to ban one of the other three nominees from competing in the Farmer challenge, thus going straight to the public vote. She chose Bia.
- **^Note 35**: On day 91, the final five contestants competed in the final immunity challenge for place in the final four. On day 92, it was announced that Pelé was the winner and became the first semifinalist of the season. André Marinho, Bárbara, Bia and Iran were automatically nominated for eviction.
- **^Note 36**: From this point on, the public votes to decide who is evicted and ultimately wins. Following André Marinho's eviction on day 93, the final four contestants were automatically nominated for the final eviction of the season.
- **^Note 37**: For the final, the public votes for the contestant they want to win A Fazenda 14.

== Ratings and reception ==
=== Brazilian ratings ===
All numbers are in points and provided by Kantar Ibope Media.

Week	First air date	Last air date	Timeslot (BRT)	Daily SP viewers (in points)							SP viewers (in points)	BR viewers (in points)	Ref.
Week	First air date	Last air date	Timeslot (BRT)	Mon	Tue	Wed	Thu	Fri	Sat	Sun	SP viewers (in points)	BR viewers (in points)	Ref.
1	September 13, 2022	September 18, 2022	Monday to Saturday; 11:00 p.m. Sunday; 11:15 p.m.	—	8.5	7.7	8.1	7.9	7.6	7.3	7.9	6.6	
2	September 19, 2022	September 25, 2022	Monday to Saturday; 11:00 p.m. Sunday; 11:15 p.m.	7.2	8.3	8.2	8.2	5.9	6.0	7.2	7.2	6.3	
3	September 26, 2022	October 2, 2022	Monday to Saturday; 11:00 p.m. Sunday; 11:15 p.m.	7.9	7.9	8.1	7.0	6.5	5.7	6.3	7.0	6.0	
4	October 3, 2022	October 9, 2022	Monday to Saturday; 11:00 p.m. Sunday; 11:15 p.m.	6.3	7.5	8.1	7.8	3.4	4.2	5.5	6.1	6.1	
5	October 10, 2022	October 16, 2022	Monday to Saturday; 11:00 p.m. Sunday; 11:15 p.m.	5.7	7.7	6.8	7.5	7.4	6.1	6.9	6.8	6.2	
6	October 17, 2022	October 23, 2022	Monday to Saturday; 11:00 p.m. Sunday; 11:15 p.m.	7.1	7.9	5.4	8.8	8.0	5.4	6.4	7.0	6.3	
7	October 24, 2022	October 30, 2022	Monday to Saturday; 11:00 p.m. Sunday; 11:15 p.m.	6.5	7.3	7.6	7.6	4.3	5.2	6.6	6.4	6.1	
8	October 31, 2022	November 6, 2022	Monday to Saturday; 10:30 p.m. Sunday; 11:15 p.m.	7.1	8.2	7.8	8.5	6.6	5.5	6.4	7.1	6.5	
9	November 7, 2022	November 13, 2022	Monday to Saturday; 10:30 p.m. Sunday; 11:15 p.m.	6.7	8.7	8.3	9.0	6.6	5.7	5.7	7.2	6.8	
10	November 14, 2022	November 20, 2022	Monday to Saturday; 10:30 p.m. Sunday; 11:15 p.m.	6.5	8.0	8.0	8.6	6.6	5.7	6.2	7.1	6.6	
11	November 21, 2022	November 27, 2022	Monday to Saturday; 10:30 p.m. Sunday; 11:15 p.m.	8.0	9.3	8.3	7.7	7.0	6.6	6.6	7.6	6.8	
12	November 28, 2022	December 4, 2022	Monday to Saturday; 10:30 p.m. Sunday; 11:15 p.m.	7.8	8.7	7.7	8.8	7.9	7.8	9.5	8.3	7.4	
13	December 5, 2022	December 11, 2022	Monday to Saturday; 10:30 p.m. Sunday; 11:15 p.m.	7.9	9.0	8.3	8.6	6.4	5.4	7.1	7.5	7.1	
14	December 12, 2022	December 15, 2022	Monday to Saturday; 10:30 p.m. Sunday; 11:15 p.m.	7.8	8.8	7.5	9.7	—	—	—	8.5	7.5	

- In 2022, each point represents 258.821 households in 15 market cities in Brazil (74.666 households in São Paulo).
