= Domingão com Huck =

Brazilian variety show

- Directed by: Clarissa Lopes; Hélio Vargas
- Presented by: Luciano Huck
- Country of origin: Brazil
- Original language: Portuguese

Production
- Producers: Barbara Maia; Matheus Pereira
- Running time: 180 minutes

Original release
- Network: TV Globo
- Release: September 5, 2021 – present

Related
- Caldeirão do Huck; Domingão do Faustão

Domingão com Huck (lit. Big Sunday with Huck) is a Brazilian variety show hosted by Luciano Huck. Premiering September 5, 2021, on TV Globo, it is the successor to both Domingão do Faustão, and Huck's previous show Caldeirão do Huck.

== History ==
In June 2021, after Fausto Silva left the network and signed with Rede Bandeirantes (where he would host the new show Faustão na Band in 2022), Globo announced that Luciano Huck—who had hosted the variety show Caldeirão do Huck for the network since 2000—would host a new Sunday-afternoon variety show in September 2021 to replace the long-running Domingão do Faustão. Domingão com Huck premiered on September 5, 2021. Meanwhile, Marcos Mion would succeed Huck on Caldeirão com Mion, which premiered the day prior.

The November 7, 2021 episode featured a tribute to sertanejo singer Marília Mendonça, who had died in a plane crash earlier that week. Huck faced criticism for remarks that were interpreted as shaming thin bodies, including saying that he had seen "half" of Marília, Maiara, and Maraísa in concert. He also discussed his survival of a plane crash with his family in 2015, which some viewers criticized as egocentric. Huck apologized the following week, saying that he immediately regretted the joke and believed that people should not be judged on their appearance.

In October 2023, Globo announced plans to divide Domingão com Huck into two halves beginning in April 2024, alongside the start of the 2024 Campeonato Brasileiro Série A football season. A new 80-minute afternoon segment would air at 2:20 p.m. BRT as a lead-in for football coverage, with the remainder of the show airing as usual at 6:00 p.m. after the match. Mirroring a format previously used by Domingão do Faustão, the move was considered an attempt to bolster Globo's afternoon schedule to better compete against SBT's Domingo Legal.

In 2024, the show conducted several live charity specials supporting those impacted by the Rio Grande do Sul floods. One covered the "Futebol Solidário" charity match on May 26, at the Maracanã Stadium, between teams coached by Dorival Júnior and Mano Menezes On August 18, the show aired a special episode paying tribute to SBT owner and entertainer Silvio Santos, following his death the previous day. It featured appearances by SBT alumni such as Angélica, Lívia Andrade, and Larissa Manoela.

== Segments ==
Some of the major game show and reality competition segments seen on Domingão com Huck have been carried over from Faustão and Caldeirão, including Dança dos Famosos, Show dos Famosos, Soletrando, Quem quer ser um milionário?, and The Wall. Globo's annual Melhores do Ano presentation also moved to the program from Faustão.

New segments have also been produced for the series, including Acredite Em Quem Quiser and Lip Sync Battle.

== Reception ==
=== Viewership ===
In the IBOPE ratings, the series premiere of Domingão com Huck received 18.5 rating points (approximately 1.4 million viewers) in Greater São Paulo, down from the numbers that Faustão had received. It was originally intended to air following Brazil's match against Argentina in the 2022 FIFA World Cup qualifiers, but the match was curtailed in the fifth minute due to COVID-19 issues; Globo aired the film Pacific Rim in place of the cancelled match, causing Domingão com Huck to be preempted by 35 minutes.

The November 7, 2021 episode with tributes to Marília Mendonça received 19.1 rating points, its largest audience at the time. The June 5, 2022 episode—which featured interviews with the cast of Globo's telenovela Pantanal from its namesake—brought Domingão com Huck its largest audience to-date, with a 19.7 rating. The record was surpassed on September 24, 2023, when an episode following the second leg of the 2023 Copa do Brasil finals scored a 20.1 rating
