= Get the F*ck Out of My House =

Dutch reality television series

Get the F*ck Out of My House (often shortened to GTFOOMH) is a reality television show originally launched in the Netherlands on RTL 5 on October 3, 2016, where it was produced by FremantleMedia owned, BlueCircle.

In the show, 100 complete strangers cram into an average sized family home in the bid to become the last person standing and win a jackpot prize, while continuously watched by television cameras.

== Versions ==
Currently airing
An upcoming season
Series was cancelled

Country	Local title	Network(s)	Winner(s)	Presenter(s)
Brazil	A Casa; The House	RecordTV; Website	Season 1, 2017: Thais Guerra	Marcos Mion
Netherlands	Get The F*ck Out Of My House	RTL 5	Season 1, 2016: Noach Blyden	Nicolette Kluijver
Germany	Get The F*ck Out Of My House	ProSieben; Website	Season 1, 2018: Oliver Nell; Season 2, 2019: Guggi	Thore Schölermann Jana Schölermann
Ukraine	100 в 1	TET	Season 1, 2018: Yevheniya Horban'	Olya Cybulska

== See also ==
- List of television show franchises
