= A Casa (TV series) =

Brazilian reality television show

- Genre: Reality competition
- Created by: BlueCircle
- Based on: Get the F*ck; Out of My House
- Directed by: Rodrigo Carelli
- Presented by: Marcos Mion
- Country of origin: Brazil
- Original language: Portuguese
- No. of seasons: 1
- No. of episodes: 21

Production
- Production locations: São Paulo, São Paulo
- Camera setup: Multiple-camera
- Running time: 90 minutes
- Production company: FremantleMedia

Original release
- Network: RecordTV
- Release: June 27 – September 5, 2017

Related
- Get The F*ck; Out Of My House

A Casa (English: The House) was a Brazilian reality competition based on the Dutch television series Get the F*ck Out of My House, hosted by Marcos Mion. The series premiered on Tuesday, June 27, 2017, at 10:30 p.m. on RecordTV.

The show features a group of 100 complete strangers, known as HouseGuests, cram into an average sized family home in the bid to become the last person standing and win a jackpot prize, while being continuously watched by television cameras.

Filming began in São Paulo on June 2 and lasted until July 4, 2017. The season finale aired live on September 5, 2017, where college student Thais Guerra won the competition with 66.96% of the public vote over personal trainer Isa Elguesabal and took home the jackpot prize of R$436.772.

== Cast ==
=== HouseGuests ===
The contestants were officially revealed by RecordTV on June 27, 2017, at 12:30 p.m.

No.	Contestant	Homestate	Occupation	Status
72	Thais Guerra	São Paulo	College student	Winner on September 5, 2017
60	Isabel "Isa" Elguesabal	Rio de Janeiro	Personal trainer	Runner-up on September 5, 2017
77	Alex Gallete	Sergipe	YouTuber	69th Evicted on September 5, 2017
56	Bruna Canto	São Paulo	Dentist	68th Evicted on September 5, 2017
79	Charles Douglas	São Paulo	Podiatrist	65th Evicted on August 31, 2017
19	Magé Dionísio	São Paulo	Personal trainer	66th Evicted on August 31, 2017
73	Thais Vidal	São Paulo	Administrative assistant	65th Evicted on August 31, 2017
75	Vivian Nagura	São Paulo	Pilates teacher	64th Evicted on August 31, 2017
57	Claianne Siqueira	Rio Grande do Sul	Cop	63rd Evicted on August 31, 2017
45	Rayllan Noronha	São Paulo	School coordinator	62nd Evicted on August 31, 2017
28	Cezar Brollo	São Paulo	Farmer	61st Evicted on August 31, 2017
76	Adriano Barsali	São Paulo	Businessman	60th Evicted on August 31, 2017
05	Anna Hass	Rio de Janeiro	Administrative assistant	59th Evicted on August 31, 2017
89	Jan Praiero	São Paulo	Car restorer	58th Evicted on August 31, 2017
81	Diego "Digu" Christianini	São Paulo	Event coordinator	57th Evicted on August 31, 2017
61	Adriana "Lolla" Riollo	São Paulo	Businesswoman	56th Evicted on August 31, 2017
49	Thiago Catarina	Santa Catarina	Salesman	55th Evicted on August 31, 2017
46	Richard Coelho	São Paulo	Technician in electronics	54th Evicted on August 31, 2017
34	Guilherme Costa	São Paulo	Actor	53rd Evicted on August 31, 2017
18	Luana Aguiar	São Paulo	Bartender	52nd Evicted on August 31, 2017
17	Karina Chung	São Paulo	Translator	51st Evicted on August 31, 2017
14	Gabriela "Gabi" Galhardoni	São Paulo	DJ	50th Evicted on August 31, 2017
04	Angela Leite	São Paulo	Hairdresser	49th Evicted on August 31, 2017
44	Patrick Schroder	São Paulo	YouTuber	48th Evicted on August 24, 2017
09	Cellyane "Cell" Oliveira	Espírito Santo	Model & actress	47th Evicted on August 24, 2017
43	Vitor "Papi Noel" Martins	São Paulo	Plastic artist	46th Evicted on August 24, 2017
35	Guilherme Fernandes	Minas Gerais	College student	45th Evicted on August 24, 2017
53	Barbara Batista	Rio de Janeiro	Saleswoman	44th Evicted on August 17, 2017
21	Raphaella Andrade	Rio de Janeiro	DJ	43rd Evicted on August 17, 2017
84	Giovani Afornali	Paraná	Events producer	42nd Evicted on August 17, 2017
65	Nely Garcia	São Paulo	Technique in nursing	41st Evicted on August 17, 2017
95	Mauricelio "Mau" Maverick	São Paulo	Realtor	Walked by Temptation on August 17, 2017
33	Guilherme "Gui" Lorandi	São Paulo	Manager	Walked on August 15, 2017
69	Sue Manabe	São Paulo	Sales consultant	40th Evicted on August 10, 2017
38	Lucas Crepaldi	São Paulo	International trade analyst	39th Evicted on August 10, 2017
85	Antônio "Thony" Machado	São Paulo	Businessman	38th Evicted on August 10, 2017
66	Patricia Rodrigues	São Paulo	Realtor	37th Evicted on August 10, 2017
68	Reiko Miyamoto	São Paulo	Therapist	36th Evicted on August 10, 2017
88	Ivan Costa	Piauí	Commercial supervisor	35th Evicted on August 10, 2017
24	Ana Silvia "Titi" Sacramento	São Paulo	Psychologist	Evacuated on August 10, 2017
94	Dyego Mattioli	Distrito Federal	Businessman	Walked on August 10, 2017
42	Mauricio Miguel	São Paulo	Salesman	Walked on August 8, 2017
63	Luiza Aragão	Distrito Federal	Journalist	Walked on August 8, 2017
13	Eliane Gouveia	Paraíba	Sales manager	34th Evicted on August 3, 2017
71	Tatiane "Tati" Romero	São Paulo	Businesswoman	33rd Evicted on August 3, 2017
03	Nathana Britto	Bahia	Hairdresser	32nd Evicted on August 3, 2017
39	Marcelo Moraes	Distrito Federal	Businessman	31st Evicted on August 3, 2017
47	Rodrigo Gonçalves	São Paulo	Delivery guy	30th Evicted on August 3, 2017
97	Rômulo Tinetti	São Paulo	Art director	Walked by Temptation on August 3, 2017
54	Beatriz Crug	São Paulo	Event producer	Walked by Temptation on August 3, 2017
11	Kelly Oliveira	São Paulo	Administrator	Walked by Temptation on August 3, 2017
02	Amaralina Machado	São Paulo	Saleswoman	Walked by Temptation on August 3, 2017
41	Maurício Bezerra	Distrito Federal	Event producer	Evacuated on August 3, 2017
70	Tainara Vargas	São Paulo	Model	29th Evicted on July 27, 2017
20	Marcele Oliver	Rio de Janeiro	Tour guide	28th Evicted on July 27, 2017
48	Saulo "Sal" Vitor Martins	São Paulo	College student	27th Evicted on July 27, 2017
67	Rafaela "Rafa" Xavier	São Paulo	BSL interpreter	26th Evicted on July 27, 2017
55	Bruna "Bru" Guimarães	São Paulo	Image consultant	25th Evicted on July 27, 2017
10	Dione Melo	Paraíba	Circus performer	24th Evicted on July 27, 2017
40	Marco Ungaro	São Paulo	Chef	23rd Evicted on July 20, 2017
92	Junior Rodrigues	São Paulo	Bartender	22nd Evicted on July 20, 2017
08	Carol Kowacs	São Paulo	Ballet dancer	21st Evicted on July 20, 2017
27	Arlindo da Cruz Filho	São Paulo	Oil Engineer	20th Evicted on July 20, 2017
82	Eduardo "Du" Kleindienst	São Paulo	Lawyer	19th Evicted on July 20, 2017
50	Tiago "Ti" Borba	Rio Grande do Sul	Fisherman	18th Evicted on July 20, 2017
64	Monick Camargo	Goiás	Model	17th Evicted on July 20, 2017
86	Augusto "Guto" Penteado	Paraná	Photographer	16th Evicted on July 20, 2017
93	Gustavo Lira	São Paulo	Massage therapist	15th Evicted on July 20, 2017
90	Jean Francisco	São Paulo	Ballroom dancer	14th Evicted on July 20, 2017
01	Alessandra "Ale" Meneghette	São Paulo	Beautician	13th Evicted on July 20, 2017
31	Eduardo D'Amico	São Paulo	Administrator	Walked on July 20, 2017
91	João Carlos "Joca" Cardoso	São Paulo	Dance teacher	Walked on July 18, 2017
59	Flavia Souza	São Paulo	College student	Walked on July 18, 2017
07	Carol Neves	São Paulo	Personal trainer	12th Evicted on July 13, 2017
36	Julio Coelho	São Paulo	Businessman	11th Evicted on July 13, 2017
23	Tânia Leite	São Paulo	Kids party planner	10th Evicted on July 13, 2017
83	Eliedson Cruz	São Paulo	Microenterprise	9th Evicted on July 13, 2017
37	Leonardo Schafer	Rio Grande do Sul	Operational manager	8th Evicted on July 13, 2017
87	Helder dos Santos	São Paulo	Electrician	7th Evicted on July 13, 2017
29	Danilo "Dan" Santana	Rio de Janeiro	Model	Walked on July 13, 2017
30	Diego Crisostomo	Ceará	Student	Walked on July 11, 2017
12	Dory de Oliveira	São Paulo	Rapper	Walked on July 11, 2017
78	Antonio Barros	São Paulo	Retired	6th Evicted on July 6, 2017
26	Allex Lopes	São Paulo	Designer	5th Evicted on July 6, 2017
25	Vanessa Carvalho	São Paulo	Yoga teacher	4th Evicted on July 6, 2017
06	Beatriz "Bia" da Costa	São Paulo	Dancer	3rd Evicted on July 6, 2017
96	Edilson Pollarah	São Paulo	Puppeteer	2nd Evicted on July 6, 2017
16	Gisele Mey	São Paulo	Saleswoman	Evacuated on July 6, 2017
32	Mauricio Suetam	Rio de Janeiro	Mountaineering guide	Evacuated on July 6, 2017
52	Andreza Domingues	São Paulo	Visual arts teacher	Walked on July 6, 2017
51	Adeline De Vincenzo	São Paulo	Singing teacher	Walked on July 6, 2017
98	Victor Dias	São Paulo	College student	Walked on July 6, 2017
62	Lauriane Kern	São Paulo	Architect & town planner	1st Evicted on June 29, 2017
58	Ellen Faria	Minas Gerais	Lawyer	Walked on June 29, 2017
99	Vinicius "Vini" Büttel	Rio de Janeiro	College student	Evacuated on June 29, 2017
80	Danilo Araujo	Rio de Janeiro	Arts teacher	Walked on June 29, 2017
100	William "Will" Arruda	São Paulo	College student	Walked on June 29, 2017
22	Samantha Aweti Kalapalo	Mato Grosso	Tour guide	Walked on June 27, 2017
74	Sarah Martins	São Paulo	Tattoo artist	Walked on June 27, 2017
15	Gabriele Zamarian	São Paulo	Cosplayer	Walked on June 27, 2017

== Future appearances ==
After this series, in 2017, Monick Camargo (64) appeared in A Fazenda 9, she finished in 4th place in the competition.

In 2018, Mauricio Miguel (42) and Vini Büttel (99) appeared in De Férias com o Ex 3 as original cast; Luiza Aragão (63) also appeared as an ex.

In 2022, Alex Gallete (77) and Vini Büttel (99) appeared in A Fazenda 14. Vini finished in 14th place, while Alex finished in 12th place.

In 2024, Luiza Aragão (63) and Nathana Britto (03) appeared on A Grande Conquista 2, they had to compete for a place to enter in the game and both of them didn't enter in the game.

== The game ==
Key

Prize challenge offer	T Total money combined	Passed the challenge (adds the offering sum)	Failed the challenge (deducts the offering sum)

=== Prize challenge ===
		Cycle 1	Cycle 2	Cycle 3	Cycle 4	Cycle 5	Cycle 6	Cycle 7	Cycle 8	Cycle 9	Cycle 10	Cycle 11
		Cycle 1	Cycle 2	Cycle 3	Cycle 4	Cycle 5	Cycle 6	Cycle 7	Cycle 8	Cycle 9	Cycle 10	Finale
Sum of money		R$945.536	R$853.976	R$730.376	R$571.240	R$479.152	R$418.836	R$304.904	R$365.756	R$335.124	R$367.156	Jackpot
Offers
Remaining prize		R$010.000	R$015.000	R$025.000	R$020.000	R$030.000	R$035.000	R$042.500	R$050.000	R$060.000	R$100.000	R$436.772
Remaining prize	T	R$955.536	R$868.976	R$705.376	R$591.240	R$509.152	R$383.836	R$347.404	R$415.756	R$395.124	R$467.156	R$436.772
Chosen for the challenge		Arlindo; Charles; Du; Guto; Isa; Junior; Raphaella; Rayllan; Rodrigo; Sue; Thiago	Arlindo; Charles; Eduardo; Guilherme F. Guto; Helder; Maurício B.	Anna; Guilherme C. Guilherme F. Luana; Miguel; Thony	Cell; Du; Gui; Gustavo; Tainara; Thony	Amaralina; Maurício B. Rodrigo	Cezar; Charles; Gui; Guilherme F. Luiza; Magé; Mau; Richard	Adriano; Alex G. Angela; Anna; Barbara; Bruna; Cell; Cezar; Claianne; Charles; Digu; Gabi; Giovani; Gui; Guilherme C. Guilherme F. Isa; Ivan; Jan; Karina; Lolla; Luana; Lucas; Magé; Mau; Nely; Papi Noel; Patrícia; Patrick; Raphaella; Rayllan; Reiko; Richard; Sue; Thais G. Thais V. Thiago; Thony; Vivian	Alex G. Anna; Barbara; Bruna; Cell; Claianne; Charles; Digu; Giovani; Guilherme C. Isa; Karina; Luana; Magé; Nely; Patrick; Raphaella; Rayllan; Thais V. Vivian	Cezar; Charles; Gabi; Luana; Rayllan; Vivian	Thais G.	

=== Panels' results ===
Placing	Cycle 1	Cycle 2	Cycle 3 (Note: On cycle 3, the thirteen houseguests tied with the most votes in the Red Panel (Anna, Arlindo, Bru Guimarães, Charles, Du, Flavia, Giovani, Lucas, Mau, Maurício Bezerra, Miguel, Patrícia and Reiko) were challenged to stay handcuffed for twelve hours. Since they passed the challenge, they all moved to the Green panel and were saved from eviction.)	Cycle 4	Cycle 5 (Note: On cycle 5, Gui and Mattioli were tied in the election for cycle's House Owner as both received the most votes from the House's vote. Per the rules, a second vote was held where the houseguests involved in the tie would not vote and the remaining houseguests could only vote for those who tied. Mattioli ended up being elected as House Owner by the most house votes over Gui.)	Cycle 6	Cycle 7 (Note: On cycle 7, the four houseguests with the fewest votes in the Red Panel (Barbara, Patrick, Raphaella and Titi) were challenged to swap floors everytime they heard a signal. Since they passed the challenge, they all moved to the Green Panel and were saved from eviction.)	Cycle 8	Cycle 9	Cycle 10				Cycle 11	
Placing	Cycle 1	Cycle 2	Cycle 3	Cycle 4	Cycle 5	Cycle 6	Cycle 7	Cycle 8	Cycle 9	Round 1	Round 2 (Note: As of this round, there were no more panels and house's vote, so the remaining houseguests had to face several challenge to continue in the competition.)	Round 3	Round 4	Round 1	Round 2 (Note: The final challenge loser would be automatically evicted. Thais Guerra won the challenge followed by Isa. In last place, Alex Gallete lost the challenge and was automatically evicted.)
1	Junior	Kelly	Titi	Adriano	Mattioli	Guilherme F.	Thiago	Alex G.	Rayllan	Thais G.	Thais G.	Thais G.	Thais G.	Isa	Thais G.
2	Carol	Junior	Kelly	Titi	Adriano	Mattioli	Guilherme F.	Thiago	Alex G.	Rayllan	Alex G.	Thais V.	Bruna	Alex G.	Isa
3	Eduardo	Carol	Marco	Alex G.	Gui	Rayllan	Giovani	Vivian	Richard	Cezar	Bruna	Isa	Alex G.	Bruna	Alex G.
4	Allex L.	Eduardo	Digu	Kelly	Guilherme F.	Miguel	Gabi	Rayllan	Magé	Vivian	Cezar	Vivian	Magé	Thais G.	
5	Cell	Marcelo	Adriano	Eduardo	Claianne	Lucas	Cell	Angela	Bruna	Isa	Charles	Magé	Charles		
6	Bru	Marco	Vivian	Nathana	Nathana	Barbara	Angela	Jan	Lolla	Magé	Isa	Alex G.	Isa		
7	Ti Borba	Barbara	Thais V.	Karina	Angela	Angela	Papi Noel	Anna	Isa	Thais V.	Magé	Bruna			
8	Patrick	Dan	Thiago	Marcelo	Guilherme C.	Titi	Guilherme C.	Adriano	Adriano	Claianne	Adriano	Charles			
9	Marcelo	Thiago	Eduardo	Maurício B.	Maurício B.	Guilherme C.	Thais G.	Gabi	Thais G.	Adriano	Anna	Claianne			
10	Guilherme C.	Adriano	Dan	Rayllan	Papi Noel	Luiza	Digu	Lolla	Charles	Anna	Claianne				
11	Sal	Du	Carol K.	Mattioli	Rodrigo	Jan	Rayllan	Karina	Angela	Angela	Rayllan				
12	Gabi	Miguel	Gustavo	Charles	Thiago	Mau	Magé	Luana	Luana	Lolla	Thais V.				
13	Eliedson	Patrick	Jan	Claianne	Bruna	Kelly	Karina	Cezar	Karina	Jan	Vivian				
14	Reiko	Sal	Alex G.	Eliane	Luiza	Amaralina	Gui	Papi Noel	Cezar	Digu					
15	Papi Noel	Vivian	Thais G.	Gabi	Amaralina	Anna	Bruna	Patrick	Patrick	Gabi					
16	Miguel	Charles	Rafa	Raphaella	Anna	Eliane	Lolla	Guilherme F.	Guilherme C.	Charles					
17	Lucas	Amaralina	Lolla	Miguel	Kelly	Karina	Isa	Barbara	Cell	Guilherme C.					
18	Arlindo	Anna	Cell	Patrick	Eliane	Gabi	Nely	Nely	Thiago	Luana					
19	Karina	Arlindo	Rayllan	Richard	Gabi	Magé	Alex G.	Raphaella	Digu	Karina					
20	Dory	Guilherme C.	Marcelo	Bru	Karina	Cezar	Mau	Mau	Jan	Thiago					
21	Claianne	Guilherme F.	Karina	Isa	Luana	Raphaella	Charles	Guilherme C.	Guilherme F.	Richard					
22	Edilson	Ti Borba	Nathana	Luiza	Magé	Gui	Luana	Giovani	Papi Noel	Bruna					
23	Jean	Bru	Rômulo	Rômulo	Titi	Thiago	Thais V.	Magé	Gabi	Alex G.					
24	Ivan	Bruna	Junior	Rafa	Cezar	Marcelo	Richard	Richard	Claianne						
25	Ellen	Mattioli	Guto	Angela	Lucas	Isa	Cezar	Thais V.	Anna						
26	Adeline	Victor	Tati	Patrícia	Marcelo	Beatriz	Patrícia	Digu	Vivian						
27	Thiago	Carol K.	Sue	Cezar	Miguel	Cell	Sue	Claianne	Thais V.						
28	Richard	Thony	Ti Borba	Dione	Patrick	Bruna	Reiko	Cell							
29	Rayllan	Mauricio S.	Richard	Magé	Rayllan	Nely	Thony	Bruna							
30	Titi	Maurício B.	Guilherme F.	Marcele	Richard	Lolla	Adriano	Thais G.							
31	Raphaella	Richard	Marcele	Anna	Cell	Reiko	Anna	Isa							
32	Nathana	Rodrigo	Magé	Gui	Isa	Sue	Lucas	Charles							
33	Rômulo	Cell	Eliane	Guilherme C.	Nely	Charles	Claianne	Gui							
34	Mau	Monick	Joca	Rodrigo	Reiko	Tati	Vivian								
35	Du	Giovani	Jean	Cell	Thais G.	Thais G.	Jan								
36	Vivian	Titi	Tainara	Nely	Thais V.	Vivian	Ivan								
37	Tati	Gustavo	Nely	Reiko	Vivian	Thais V.	Mattioli								
38	Rafa	Dione	Monick	Sue	Alex G.	Adriano	Patrick								
39	Monick	Julio	Luiza	Thais V.	Charles	Rômulo	Raphaella								
40	Beatriz	Gabi	Isa	Vivian	Digu	Giovani	Titi								
41	Maurício B.	Lucas	Bruna	Giovani	Giovani	Thony	Barbara								
42	Marcele	Rayllan	Rodrigo	Thony	Jan	Alex G.	Miguel								
43	Bia	Beatriz	Gui	Ivan	Raphaella	Claianne	Luiza								
44	Gustavo	Rafa	Raphaella	Jan	Sal	Luana									
45	Jan	Alex G.	Luana	Mau	Barbara	Papi Noel									
46	Giovani	Helder	Gabi	Carol K.	Beatriz	Rodrigo									
47	Charles	Nathana	Dione	Luana	Lolla	Patrícia									
48	Alex G.	Eliane	Mau	Guilherme F.	Patrícia	Ivan									
49	Adriano	Gisele	Giovani	Lucas	Rafa	Digu									
50	Thais G.	Raphaella	Du	Ti Borba	Sue	Nathana									
51	Isa	Diego	Charles	Barbara	Ivan	Patrick									
52	Bruna	Papi Noel	Reiko	Bruna	Mau	Richard									
53	Barbara	Adeline	Patrícia	Lolla	Dione	Maurício B.									
54	Andreza	Flavia	Flavia	Monick	Marcele										
55	Rodrigo	Tati	Bru	Thais G.	Bru										
56	Leonardo	Thais G.	Miguel	Gustavo	Tainara										
57	Guilherme F.	Thais V.	Maurício B.	Du	Tati										
58	Mauricio S.	Bia	Lucas	Guto	Thony										
59	Vanessa	Claianne	Arlindo	Jean	Rômulo										
60	Luana	Dory	Anna	Digu											
61	Anna	Luana	Ivan	Junior											
62	Victor	Marcele	Helder	Tati											
63	Mattioli	Allex L.	Barbara	Thiago											
64	Patrícia	Edilson	Cezar	Amaralina											
65	Lolla	Andreza	Tânia	Beatriz											
66	Will	Isa	Claianne	Sal											
67	Vini	Jean	Carol	Tainara											
68	Joca	Mau	Angela	Ale											
69	Helder	Tainara	Amaralina	Papi Noel											
70	Guto	Digu	Ale	Arlindo											
71	Thais V.	Patrícia	Mattioli	Marco											
72	Marco	Luiza	Thony	Joca											
73	Julio	Gui	Patrick	Flavia											
74	Gui	Angela	Leonardo												
75	Diego	Magé	Eliedson												
76	Dan	Vanessa	Beatriz												
77	Gisele	Cezar	Sal												
78	Eliane	Sue	Papi Noel												
79	Kelly	Lolla	Julio												
80	Angela	Nely	Guilherme C.												
81	Amaralina	Guto	Diego												
82	Ale	Leonardo	Dory												
83	Thony	Eliedson													
84	Danilo	Reiko													
85	Sue	Ivan													
86	Nely	Jan													
87	Luiza	Rômulo													
88	Lauriane	Joca													
89	Cezar	Karina													
90	Carol K.	Tânia													
91	Digu	Antonio													
92	Antonio	Ale													
93	Tainara														
94	Flavia														
95	Tânia														
96	Magé														
97	Dione														
98	Samantha														
99	Sarah														
100	Gabriele														

=== Elimination table ===
Key

HouseGuest received the most public votes and finish as the winner
HouseGuest received the least public votes and finish as runner-up
HouseGuest was voted in the Green panel and was House Owner

HouseGuest was voted in the Green panel
HouseGuest was immune
HouseGuest was voted in the Red panel and placed in the Risk zone
HouseGuest was placed in the Risk zone and saved

HouseGuest was placed in the Risk zone and evicted
HouseGuest quit
HouseGuest quit by tooking Temptation
HouseGuest was medically evacuated

No.	HouseGuest	Cycle																														
No.	HouseGuest	1 (Note: Gabriele, Sarah, Samantha, Will, Danilo and Ellen to withdraw from the competition after leaving the house, respectively. As Danilo and Will were nominated for the Red Panel, they did not face the cycle 1's eviction ceremony.) (Note: Before the cycle's eviction, Vini suffered a cardiac arrhythmia. Unable to continue in the game because of his health, Vini was evacuated from the competition for medical reasons and had to leave the house. As he was nominated for the Red Panel, he did not face the cycle 1's eviction ceremony.)		2 (Note: Victor, Adeline and Andreza to withdraw from the competition after leaving the house, respectively. As Andreza was nominated for the Red Panel, she did not face the cycle 2's eviction ceremony.) (Note: Before the cycle's eviction, Mauricio Suetam and Gisele contracted conjunctivitis. In order not to infect the other houseguests, Mauricio Suetam and Gisele were evacuated from the competition for medical reasons and had to leave the house.)		3 (Note: Dory, Diego and Dan to withdraw from the competition after leaving the house, respectively.) (Note: On cycle 3, the thirteen houseguests tied with the most votes in the Red Panel (Anna, Arlindo, Bru Guimarães, Charles, Du, Flavia, Giovani, Lucas, Mau, Maurício Bezerra, Miguel, Patrícia and Reiko) were challenged to stay handcuffed for twelve hours. Since they passed the challenge, they all moved to the Green panel and were saved from eviction.)		4 (Note: Flavia, Joca and Eduardo to withdraw from the competition after leaving the house, respectively.)		5 (Note: On cycle 5, Gui and Mattioli were tied in the election for cycle's House Owner as both received the most votes from the House's vote. Per the rules, a second vote was held where the houseguests involved in the tie would not vote and the remaining houseguests could only vote for those who tied. Mattioli ended up being elected as House Owner by the most house votes over Gui.)		6 (Note: After the cycle's the panels ceremony, Maurício B. contracted conjunctivitis. In order not to infect the other houseguests, Maurício Bezerra was evacuated from the competition for medical reasons and had to leave the house. As he was nominated for the Red Panel, he did not face the cycle 6's eviction ceremony.) (Note: On cycle 6, there was a temptation challenge, which was a 0 km car, where the challenged had to start the car with the correct key, to win it, but for this, the four houseguests who gave up the competition, are the ones who would have the chance to compete for the car, win or not, with no chance of regret. Amaralina, Kelly, Beatriz and Rômulo to withdraw from the competition to try to win the temptation. Beatriz won the challenge, and ended up taking the prize. As they were nominated for the Red Panel, also they did not face the cycle 6's eviction ceremony.)		7 (Note: Luiza, Miguel and Mattioli to withdraw from the competition after leaving the house, respectively. As Mattioli was nominated for the Red Panel, he did not face the cycle 7's eviction ceremony.) (Note: On cycle 7, the four houseguests with the fewest votes in the Red Panel (Barbara, Patrick, Raphaella and Titi) were challenged to swap floors everytime they heard a signal. Since they passed the challenge, they all moved to the Green Panel and were saved from eviction. However, Titi was medically evacuated shortly after.) (Note: After the result of the salvation challenge, Titi contracted conjunctivitis. In order not to infect the other houseguests, Titi was evacuated from the competition for medical reasons and had to leave the house.)		8 (Note: Gui to withdraw from the competition after leaving the house.) (Note: On cycle 8, there was a temptation challenge, which was a trip with another companion for Las Vegas, where the challenged had to hit the largest number of balls of his corresponding color inside a tray of eggs, to earn it, but only the winner of this challenge would gave up the competition, no chance of repentance. Mau won the challenge and withdrew from the competition, with that, he ended up taking the prize. As he was nominated for the Red Panel, also he did not face the cycle 8's eviction ceremony.)		9		10								11				
No.	HouseGuest	1		2		3		4		5		6		7		8		9		Round 1 (Note: This round's eviction ceremony, Thais Guerra, as House Owner, did not choice who to evict. Instead, she had to save three houseguests, with the ten unsaved houseguests being evicted. Thais Guerra saved Bruna, Alex Gallete and Charles. Because of this, Angela, Gabi, Karina, Luana, Guilherme Costa, Richard, Thiago, Lolla, Digu and Jan were evicted from the competition.)		Round 2 (Note: This round, the remaining houseguests were divided into two groups to face an agility challenge, where each group had to reach a consensus to evict a houseguest of their own group from the competition. The losing group of the challenge (Adriano, Anna, Claianne, Rayllan, Thais Vidal and Vivian) had to evict two houseguests from the group, while the winning group (Alex Gallete, Bruna, Cezar, Charles, Isa and Magé) had to evict only a houseguest. The losing group evicted Anna and Adriano, and the winning group evicted Cezar. After the choices of the groups, the winning group had to evict one more houseguest of the losing group of the competition. The winning group evicted Rayllan.)		Round 3 (Note: This round, the remaining houseguests competed for immunity and the right to evict three houseguests from the competition through an dexterity challenge. Thais Guerra won the competition and gained immunity, she also had the right to evict someone, and evicted Claianne, Vivian and Thais Vidal.)		Round 4 (Note: This round, the remaining houseguests competed for immunity and the right to evict two houseguests from the competition through an endurance challenge. Thais Guerra won the competition and gained immunity, she also had the right to evict someone, and evicted Magé and Charles.)		Round 1 (Note: This round, the remaining houseguests competed for immunity and the right to evict a houseguest from the competition through a memory challenge. Isa won the competition and gained immunity, she also had the right to evict someone, and evicted Bruna.)		Round 2 (Note: The final three houseguests competed in an agility challenge for a place in the Finale. The final challenge loser would be automatically evicted. However, host Mion revealed that the results would be delivered only during the live final. Thais Guerra won the challenge followed by Isa. In last place, Alex Gallete lost the challenge and was automatically evicted.)		Finale (Note: Following the live final eviction, the public votes for the houseguest they want to win A Casa.)
72	Thais G.	SAFE	IMM	SAFE	IMM	SAFE	IMM	RISK	SAFE	SAFE	IMM	RISK	SAFE	SAFE	IMM	RISK	SAFE	SAFE	IMM	OWNER		IMM		SAFE	IMM	SAFE	IMM	RISK	SAFE	SAFE	IMM	WINNER
60	Isa	SAFE	IMM	RISK	SAFE	SAFE	IMM	SAFE	IMM	SAFE	IMM	RISK	SAFE	SAFE	IMM	RISK	SAFE	SAFE	IMM	SAFE	IMM	SAFE	IMM	RISK	SAFE	RISK	SAFE	SAFE	IMM	RISK	SAFE	RUNNER-UP
77	Alex G.	SAFE	IMM	SAFE	IMM	SAFE	IMM	SAFE	IMM	SAFE	IMM	RISK	SAFE	SAFE	IMM	OWNER		IMM		RISK	SAFE	SAFE	IMM	RISK	SAFE	RISK	SAFE	RISK	SAFE	RISK	EVIC	
56	Bruna	SAFE	IMM	SAFE	IMM	SAFE	IMM	RISK	SAFE	SAFE	IMM	RISK	SAFE	SAFE	IMM	RISK	SAFE	SAFE	IMM	RISK	SAFE	SAFE	IMM	RISK	SAFE	RISK	SAFE	RISK	EVIC			
79	Charles	SAFE	IMM	SAFE	IMM	RISK	SAFE	SAFE	IMM	SAFE	IMM	RISK	SAFE	SAFE	IMM	RISK	SAFE	SAFE	IMM	RISK	SAFE	SAFE	IMM	RISK	SAFE	RISK	EVIC					
19	Magé	RISK	SAFE	RISK	SAFE	SAFE	IMM	SAFE	IMM	SAFE	IMM	RISK	SAFE	SAFE	IMM	RISK	SAFE	SAFE	IMM	SAFE	IMM	SAFE	IMM	RISK	SAFE	RISK	EVIC					
73	Thais V.	RISK	SAFE	SAFE	IMM	SAFE	IMM	SAFE	IMM	SAFE	IMM	RISK	SAFE	RISK	SAFE	RISK	SAFE	RISK	SAFE	SAFE	IMM	RISK	SAFE	RISK	EVIC							
75	Vivian	SAFE	IMM	SAFE	IMM	SAFE	IMM	SAFE	IMM	SAFE	IMM	RISK	SAFE	RISK	SAFE	SAFE	IMM	RISK	SAFE	SAFE	IMM	RISK	SAFE	RISK	EVIC							
57	Claianne	SAFE	IMM	RISK	SAFE	RISK	SAFE	SAFE	IMM	SAFE	IMM	RISK	SAFE	RISK	SAFE	RISK	SAFE	RISK	SAFE	SAFE	IMM	RISK	SAFE	RISK	EVIC							
45	Rayllan	SAFE	IMM	SAFE	IMM	SAFE	IMM	SAFE	IMM	SAFE	IMM	SAFE	IMM	SAFE	IMM	SAFE	IMM	OWNER		IMM		RISK	EVIC									
28	Cezar	RISK	SAFE	RISK	SAFE	RISK	SAFE	SAFE	IMM	SAFE	IMM	RISK	SAFE	RISK	SAFE	SAFE	IMM	RISK	SAFE	SAFE	IMM	SAFE	EVIC									
76	Adriano	SAFE	IMM	SAFE	IMM	SAFE	IMM	OWNER		IMM		RISK	SAFE	RISK	SAFE	SAFE	IMM	SAFE	IMM	SAFE	IMM	RISK	EVIC									
05	Anna	SAFE	IMM	SAFE	IMM	RISK	SAFE	SAFE	IMM	SAFE	IMM	RISK	SAFE	RISK	SAFE	SAFE	IMM	RISK	SAFE	SAFE	IMM	RISK	EVIC									
89	Jan	SAFE	IMM	RISK	SAFE	SAFE	IMM	SAFE	IMM	SAFE	IMM	SAFE	IMM	RISK	SAFE	SAFE	IMM	RISK	SAFE	RISK	EVIC											
81	Digu	RISK	SAFE	RISK	SAFE	SAFE	IMM	RISK	SAFE	SAFE	IMM	RISK	SAFE	SAFE	IMM	RISK	SAFE	RISK	SAFE	RISK	EVIC											
61	Lolla	RISK	SAFE	RISK	SAFE	SAFE	IMM	RISK	SAFE	RISK	SAFE	RISK	SAFE	SAFE	IMM	SAFE	IMM	SAFE	IMM	RISK	EVIC											
49	Thiago	SAFE	IMM	SAFE	IMM	SAFE	IMM	RISK	SAFE	SAFE	IMM	RISK	SAFE	OWNER		IMM		RISK	SAFE	RISK	EVIC											
46	Richard	SAFE	IMM	SAFE	IMM	SAFE	IMM	SAFE	IMM	SAFE	IMM	RISK	SAFE	RISK	SAFE	RISK	SAFE	SAFE	IMM	RISK	EVIC											
34	Guilherme C.	SAFE	IMM	SAFE	IMM	RISK	SAFE	SAFE	IMM	SAFE	IMM	SAFE	IMM	SAFE	IMM	RISK	SAFE	RISK	SAFE	RISK	EVIC											
18	Luana	SAFE	IMM	RISK	SAFE	SAFE	IMM	RISK	SAFE	SAFE	IMM	RISK	SAFE	RISK	SAFE	SAFE	IMM	RISK	SAFE	RISK	EVIC											
17	Karina	SAFE	IMM	RISK	SAFE	SAFE	IMM	SAFE	IMM	SAFE	IMM	RISK	SAFE	SAFE	IMM	SAFE	IMM	RISK	SAFE	RISK	EVIC											
14	Gabi	SAFE	IMM	SAFE	IMM	SAFE	IMM	SAFE	IMM	SAFE	IMM	RISK	SAFE	SAFE	IMM	SAFE	IMM	RISK	SAFE	RISK	EVIC											
04	Angela	RISK	SAFE	RISK	SAFE	RISK	SAFE	SAFE	IMM	SAFE	IMM	SAFE	IMM	SAFE	IMM	SAFE	IMM	RISK	SAFE	RISK	EVIC											
44	Patrick	SAFE	IMM	SAFE	IMM	RISK	SAFE	SAFE	IMM	SAFE	IMM	RISK	SAFE	RISK	SAFE	SAFE	IMM	RISK	EVIC													
09	Cell	SAFE	IMM	SAFE	IMM	SAFE	IMM	SAFE	IMM	SAFE	IMM	RISK	SAFE	SAFE	IMM	RISK	SAFE	RISK	EVIC													
43	Papi Noel	SAFE	IMM	SAFE	IMM	RISK	SAFE	RISK	SAFE	SAFE	IMM	RISK	SAFE	SAFE	IMM	SAFE	IMM	RISK	EVIC													
35	Guilherme F.	SAFE	IMM	SAFE	IMM	SAFE	IMM	RISK	SAFE	SAFE	IMM	OWNER		IMM		SAFE	IMM	RISK	EVIC													
53	Barbara	SAFE	IMM	SAFE	IMM	RISK	SAFE	RISK	SAFE	RISK	SAFE	SAFE	IMM	RISK	SAFE	RISK	EVIC															
21	Raphaella	SAFE	IMM	SAFE	IMM	SAFE	IMM	SAFE	IMM	RISK	SAFE	RISK	SAFE	RISK	SAFE	RISK	EVIC															
84	Giovani	SAFE	IMM	SAFE	IMM	RISK	SAFE	SAFE	IMM	SAFE	IMM	RISK	SAFE	SAFE	IMM	RISK	EVIC															
65	Nely	RISK	SAFE	RISK	SAFE	SAFE	IMM	SAFE	IMM	SAFE	IMM	RISK	SAFE	SAFE	IMM	RISK	EVIC															
95	Mau	SAFE	IMM	RISK	SAFE	RISK	SAFE	SAFE	IMM	RISK	SAFE	SAFE	IMM	SAFE	IMM	RISK	QUIT															
33	Gui	RISK	SAFE	RISK	SAFE	SAFE	IMM	SAFE	IMM	SAFE	IMM	RISK	SAFE	SAFE	IMM	QUIT																
69	Sue	RISK	SAFE	RISK	SAFE	SAFE	IMM	SAFE	IMM	RISK	SAFE	RISK	SAFE	RISK	EVIC																	
38	Lucas	SAFE	IMM	SAFE	IMM	RISK	SAFE	RISK	SAFE	SAFE	IMM	SAFE	IMM	RISK	EVIC																	
85	Thony	RISK	SAFE	SAFE	IMM	RISK	SAFE	SAFE	IMM	RISK	SAFE	RISK	SAFE	RISK	EVIC																	
66	Patricia	RISK	SAFE	RISK	SAFE	RISK	SAFE	SAFE	IMM	RISK	SAFE	RISK	SAFE	RISK	EVIC																	
68	Reiko	SAFE	IMM	RISK	SAFE	RISK	SAFE	SAFE	IMM	SAFE	IMM	RISK	SAFE	RISK	EVIC																	
88	Ivan	SAFE	IMM	RISK	SAFE	RISK	SAFE	SAFE	IMM	RISK	SAFE	RISK	SAFE	RISK	EVIC																	
24	Titi	SAFE	IMM	SAFE	IMM	OWNER		IMM		SAFE	IMM	SAFE	IMM	RISK	EVAC																	
94	Mattioli	RISK	SAFE	SAFE	IMM	RISK	SAFE	SAFE	IMM	OWNER		IMM		RISK	QUIT																	
42	Miguel	SAFE	IMM	SAFE	IMM	RISK	SAFE	SAFE	IMM	SAFE	IMM	SAFE	IMM	QUIT																		
63	Luiza	RISK	SAFE	RISK	SAFE	SAFE	IMM	SAFE	IMM	SAFE	IMM	SAFE	IMM	QUIT																		
13	Elaine	RISK	SAFE	SAFE	IMM	SAFE	IMM	SAFE	IMM	SAFE	IMM	RISK	EVIC																			
71	Tati	SAFE	IMM	SAFE	IMM	SAFE	IMM	RISK	SAFE	RISK	SAFE	RISK	EVIC																			
03	Nathana	SAFE	IMM	SAFE	IMM	SAFE	IMM	SAFE	IMM	SAFE	IMM	RISK	EVIC																			
39	Marcelo	SAFE	IMM	SAFE	IMM	SAFE	IMM	SAFE	IMM	SAFE	IMM	RISK	EVIC																			
47	Rodrigo	SAFE	IMM	SAFE	IMM	SAFE	IMM	SAFE	IMM	SAFE	IMM	RISK	EVIC																			
97	Rômulo	SAFE	IMM	RISK	SAFE	SAFE	IMM	SAFE	IMM	RISK	SAFE	RISK	QUIT																			
54	Beatriz	SAFE	IMM	SAFE	IMM	RISK	SAFE	RISK	SAFE	RISK	SAFE	RISK	QUIT																			
11	Kelly	RISK	SAFE	OWNER		IMM		SAFE	IMM	SAFE	IMM	RISK	QUIT																			
02	Amaralina	RISK	SAFE	SAFE	IMM	RISK	SAFE	RISK	SAFE	SAFE	IMM	RISK	QUIT																			
41	Maurício B.	SAFE	IMM	SAFE	IMM	RISK	SAFE	SAFE	IMM	SAFE	IMM	RISK	EVAC																			
70	Tainara	RISK	SAFE	RISK	SAFE	SAFE	IMM	RISK	SAFE	RISK	EVIC																					
20	Marcele	SAFE	IMM	RISK	SAFE	SAFE	IMM	SAFE	IMM	RISK	EVIC																					
48	Sal	SAFE	IMM	SAFE	IMM	RISK	SAFE	RISK	SAFE	RISK	EVIC																					
67	Rafa	SAFE	IMM	SAFE	IMM	SAFE	IMM	SAFE	IMM	RISK	EVIC																					
55	Bru Guimarães	SAFE	IMM	SAFE	IMM	RISK	SAFE	SAFE	IMM	RISK	EVIC																					
10	Dione	RISK	SAFE	SAFE	IMM	SAFE	IMM	SAFE	IMM	RISK	EVIC																					
40	Marco	RISK	SAFE	SAFE	IMM	SAFE	IMM	RISK	EVIC																							
92	Junior	OWNER		IMM		SAFE	IMM	RISK	EVIC																							
08	Carol K.	RISK	SAFE	SAFE	IMM	SAFE	IMM	RISK	EVIC																							
27	Arlindo	SAFE	IMM	SAFE	IMM	RISK	SAFE	RISK	EVIC																							
82	Du	SAFE	IMM	SAFE	IMM	RISK	SAFE	RISK	EVIC																							
50	Ti Borba	SAFE	IMM	SAFE	IMM	SAFE	IMM	RISK	EVIC																							
64	Monick	SAFE	IMM	SAFE	IMM	SAFE	IMM	RISK	EVIC																							
86	Guto	RISK	SAFE	RISK	SAFE	SAFE	IMM	RISK	EVIC																							
93	Gustavo	SAFE	IMM	SAFE	IMM	SAFE	IMM	RISK	EVIC																							
90	Jean	SAFE	IMM	RISK	SAFE	SAFE	IMM	RISK	EVIC																							
01	Ale	RISK	SAFE	RISK	SAFE	RISK	SAFE	RISK	EVIC																							
31	Eduardo	SAFE	IMM	SAFE	IMM	SAFE	IMM	SAFE	QUIT																							
91	Joca	RISK	SAFE	RISK	SAFE	SAFE	IMM	QUIT																								
59	Flavia	RISK	SAFE	SAFE	IMM	RISK	SAFE	QUIT																								
07	Carol	SAFE	IMM	SAFE	IMM	RISK	EVIC																									
36	Julio	RISK	SAFE	SAFE	IMM	RISK	EVIC																									
23	Tânia	RISK	SAFE	RISK	SAFE	RISK	EVIC																									
83	Eliedson	SAFE	IMM	RISK	SAFE	RISK	EVIC																									
37	Leonardo	SAFE	IMM	RISK	SAFE	RISK	EVIC																									
87	Helder	RISK	SAFE	SAFE	IMM	RISK	EVIC																									
29	Dan	RISK	SAFE	SAFE	IMM	SAFE	QUIT																									
30	Diego	RISK	SAFE	SAFE	IMM	QUIT																										
12	Dory	SAFE	IMM	RISK	SAFE	QUIT																										
78	Antonio	RISK	SAFE	RISK	EVIC																											
26	Allex L.	SAFE	IMM	RISK	EVIC																											
25	Vanessa	SAFE	IMM	RISK	EVIC																											
06	Bia	SAFE	IMM	RISK	EVIC																											
96	Edilson	SAFE	IMM	RISK	EVIC																											
16	Gisele	RISK	SAFE	SAFE	EVAC																											
32	Mauricio S.	SAFE	IMM	SAFE	EVAC																											
52	Andreza	SAFE	IMM	RISK	QUIT																											
51	Adeline	SAFE	IMM	SAFE	QUIT																											
98	Victor	RISK	SAFE	SAFE	QUIT																											
62	Lauriane	RISK	EVIC																													
58	Ellen	SAFE	QUIT																													
99	Vini	RISK	EVAC																													
80	Danilo	RISK	QUIT																													
100	Will	RISK	QUIT																													
22	Samantha	QUIT																														
74	Sarah	QUIT																														
15	Gabriele	QUIT																														

== Spin-offs ==
=== A Casa Online ===
An online spin-off show titled A Casa Online was presented by Rafael Calixto. The show was broadcast live on Facebook after every episode and is also available on-demand via R7 Play. It features interviews with special guests and exclusive content across social media sites like YouTube.

== Ratings and reception ==
Season	Timeslot (BRT)	Episodes	Premiered		Ended		TV season	SP viewers (in points)	Source
Season	Timeslot (BRT)	Episodes	Date	Viewers (in points)	Date	Viewers (in points)	TV season	SP viewers (in points)	Source
1	Tuesday 10:30 p.m. Thursday 10:30 p.m.	21	June 27, 2017	8.0	September 5, 2017	4.4	2017–18	5.90	

- Each point represents a specific number of households in São Paulo.
  - 2017: 70.500 households.

=== Brazilian ratings ===
All numbers are in points and provided by Kantar Ibope Media.

Episode	Title	Air date	Timeslot (BRT)	SP viewers (in points)	Source
1	House Owner & Panel result	June 27, 2017	Tuesday 10:30 p.m.	8.0	
2	Prize challenge & Evictions	June 29, 2017	Thursday 10:30 p.m.	7.9	
3	House Owner & Panel result	July 4, 2017	Tuesday 10:30 p.m.	7.1	
4	Prize challenge & Evictions	July 6, 2017	Thursday 10:30 p.m.	7.1	
5	House Owner & Panel result	July 11, 2017	Tuesday 10:30 p.m.	6.8	
6	Prize challenge & Evictions	July 13, 2017	Thursday 10:30 p.m.	7.8	
7	House Owner & Panel result	July 18, 2017	Tuesday 10:30 p.m.	6.1	
8	Prize challenge & Evictions	July 20, 2017	Thursday 10:30 p.m.	6.4	
9	House Owner & Panel result	July 25, 2017	Tuesday 10:30 p.m.	4.9	
10	Prize challenge & Evictions	July 27, 2017	Thursday 10:30 p.m.	6.0	
11	House Owner & Panel result	August 1, 2017	Tuesday 10:30 p.m.	5.0	
12	Prize challenge & Evictions	August 3, 2017	Thursday 10:30 p.m.	5.2	
13	House Owner & Panel result	August 8, 2017	Tuesday 10:30 p.m.	5.2	
14	Prize challenge & Evictions	August 10, 2017	Thursday 10:30 p.m.	5.2	
15	House Owner & Panel result	August 15, 2017	Tuesday 10:30 p.m.	5.1	
16	Prize challenge & Evictions	August 17, 2017	Thursday 10:30 p.m.	5.5	
17	House Owner & Panel result	August 22, 2017	Tuesday 10:30 p.m.	4.2	
18	Prize challenge & Evictions	August 24, 2017	Thursday 10:30 p.m.	5.4	
19	Panel result & Prize challenge	August 29, 2017	Tuesday 10:30 p.m.	4.9	
20	Evictions & Final four chosen	August 31, 2017	Thursday 10:30 p.m.	5.7	
21	Winner Announced	September 5, 2017	Tuesday 10:30 p.m.	4.4	

- In 2017, each point represents 245.700 households in 15 market cities in Brazil (70.500 households in São Paulo).
