= MC Kevin =

Brazilian singer (1998–2021)

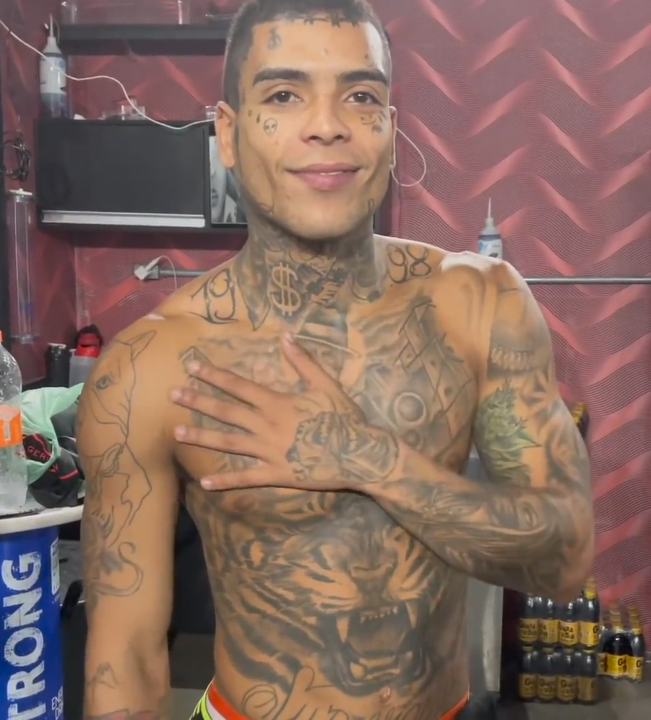
- MC Kevin in 2021
- Born: Kevin Nascimento Bueno; 29 April 1998; São Paulo, Brazil
- Died: 16 May 2021 (aged 23); Rio de Janeiro, Brazil
- Occupation: Singer
- Years active: 2013–2021
- Spouse: Deolane Bezerra (m. 2021–2021)
- Partner: Evelin Gusmão
- Children: 1
- Parents: Agnaldo Barros (father); Valquíria Nascimento (mother)
- Musical career
- Genres: Funk carioca; Trap
- Instrument: Vocal

Kevin Nascimento Bueno (29 April 1998 – 16 May 2021), better known by his stage name MC Kevin, was a Brazilian singer of funk carioca and trap, addition to his solo songs, Kevin has a list of collaborative hits with funk artists from São Paulo such as MC Davi, MC Hariel, Kevinho, MC Pedrinho, MC Don Juan, Salvador da Rima, MC Ryan SP, among others.

== Musical career ==
Son of Valquíria Nascimento (mother) and Agnaldo Barros (father), MC Kevin was born in Villa Ede, in northern São Paulo. He started being involved in the music business in 2013, and began to be successful on the KondZilla and GR6 Music YouTube channels. The singer became known for hits such as "O Menino Encantou a Quebrada", "Cavalo de Troia", "Pra Inveja é Tchau" and "Veracruz".

In addition to his solo songs, Kevin has a list of collaborative hits with funk artists from São Paulo such as MC Davi, MC Hariel, Kevinho, MC Pedrinho, MC Don Juan, Salvador da Rima, MC Ryan SP, among others.

== Personal life ==
MC Kevin was married to criminal lawyer Deolane Bezerra from 29 April 2021 until his death less than three weeks later. The two made the union official in Tulum, Mexico and resided in Mogi das Cruzes, in Greater São Paulo. He had previously been in a relationship with Evelin Gusmão, with whom he had his daughter, Soraya Gusmão.

== Last show ==
The singer was staying in Rio de Janeiro for a performance at the Mansão Imperador nightclub, located in Madureira, in the northern zone of the city. In the local event known as Baile do Imperador, the singer performed his last show accompanied by his wife, at dawn from 15 to 16 May 2021.

== Death ==
MC Kevin died at the age of 23, after falling from the fifth floor of the Rio de Janeiro hotel Barra da Tijuca in Avenida Lúcio Costa. He was staying with his wife and friends when he fell. On the way to the hospital, he suffered two heart attacks. Kevin was taken alive to Miguel Couto Hospital, but he did not survive his injuries. It was alleged that he attempted to hide from his wife so she would not discover his infidelity.
