= MC Léo da Baixada =

- Birth name: Leonardo de Freitas Cruz
- Born: 19 June 1992 (age 32); São Vicente, São Paulo, Brazil
- Genres: Funk ostentação; melodic funk
- Occupation: Singer
- Years active: 2000–present

MC Léo da Baixada, stage name of Leonardo de Freitas Cruz (São Vicente, June 19, 1992) is a singer-songwriter. One of his most notable songs is "Ostentação fora do Normal", with the participation of MC Daleste. In 2012 began his first TV appearances.

== Discography ==
=== Albums ===
- "Fora do Normal" (2014)
- "Ostentação Fora do Normal" (2013)

=== Singles ===
- "Ostentação Fora do Normal (featuring MC Daleste)"
- "Pai das Folhas"
- "Audi ou RR"
- "Conforto de Patrão"
- "Vida Diferenciada" (featuring MC Pedrinho)
- "Ubatuba"
- "Ter Uma Noção"
- "Roubando a Cena (featuring MC Jonão)
- "Foi Assim Que Eu Aprendi" (featuring MC Nego do Borel)
- "Firma Milionária (featuring MC Frank)
- "Se Empenhar"
- "Bala Gold"
- "Água de Côco (featuring MC Menor da VG)
- "As Estruturas (featuring MC Davi)
