= MC Pedrinho =

Brazilian singer

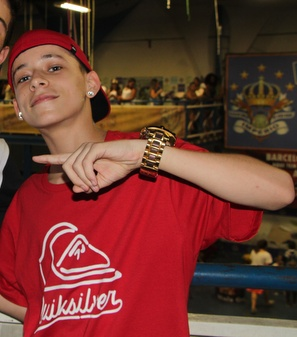
- MC Pedrinho in January 2016

Background information
- Born: Pedro Maia Tempester; 3 May 2002 (age 24); Cabreúva, São Paulo
- Genres: Funk ostentação; melodic funk; trap
- Occupation: Singer
- Years active: 2013–present

Pedro Maia Tempester (born May 3, 2002), better known by the stage name of MC Pedrinho, is a Brazilian funk artist. He is best known for his song titled "Dom Dom Dom". His songs have experienced an attempted ban by prosecutors within the national territory on account of the explicit lyrics in his songs.

== Biography ==
=== Personal life ===
Pedro began his career at age 12 in 2014, but starting singing at the young age of 8 years old in a bazaar in Vila Maria, a neighborhood in the North Zone of São Paulo. He was mainly influenced by the popular genre of his environment. The first song to jump start his career is titled "Dom Dom Dom". The song was made in collaboration with MC Livinho, and its lyrics were clearly related to oral sex. One of the verses states: "Get on your knees, get ready and give a nice blowjob." This song was released when Pedro was only 11 years old, a fact that was not well received by the media. A few months later Pedro launched a light version of the song, whose video clip was produced by Rio Tom Productions, without sex references. After this, he said in an interview that he would switch to the pop genre. He followed this path for a long time and continued making music in the so-called funk ousadia genre.

One of his songs which also was successful and ended up being directed more toward the funk fanfare was the "Differentiated Life" song with the participation of the renowned MC Léo da Baixada. According to an interview with G1 portal, Pedrinho says the funk you enabled a huge improvement in living conditions, and as a child went hungry. Among his other hit songs along the lines of proibidão are "Hit do Verão", "Matemática" and "Geometria da Putaria" which placed it as a major funk scene revelations in 2015. His page on Facebook accumulates about 2.5 million fans.

Pedrinho just gained prominence in the media after the Children and Youth Court, at the request of the prosecution, canceled a show that would be held in the city of Fortaleza, Ceará, considering the music inappropriate for his age. The claim of the prosecutor Luciano Tonet was that Pedrinho had a "musical repertoire endowed with clear sexual connotations, high erotic content, pornography, profanity and all kinds of vulgarity, incompatible with the specific conditions of the developing person". The next day, the prosecutor expressed the desire to ban the singer's songs throughout the national territory on the grounds of "a model for others". However, the singer was not bothered by the ban attempt and, just three days later, released another song with sexual content. Despite criticism of Pedrinho's lyrics, his mother, Analee Maia, said that she supports him in every way, but that she prefers the songs without swearing; another interesting fact is that he has said in several interviews that he never made out.

He had his first girlfriend in 2018, Brazilian actress Tiffany Alvarez. Their relationship lasted about 3 months. That same year, at only 16 years old, Pedrinho began getting multiple tattoos, especially on his arms and chest.

== Singles ==
1. "Dom Dom Dom" (featuring MC Livinho)
2. "Dom Dom Dom (versão light)"
3. "Especialmente Pras Elas (featuring MC PH)
4. "Ela e Doida"
5. "Matemática"
6. "Hum, Tá da Hora (Maravilha, Tá Legal)"
7. "Planeta da Putaria"
8. "Geometria da Putaria"
9. "Senta e Contrai"
10. "Vida Diferenciada" (featuring MC Léo da Baixada)
11. "Se Prepara (featuring MC Livinho)
12. "Prepara Novinha" (featuring MC Kevin)
13. "Na Perereca" (featuring MC Menor da VG)
14. "Menino Sonhador"
15. "Nosso Amor”
16. "Linda Morena”
17. "Amor"
18. Beber Enlouquecer
19. Cinderela
20. Amores Brilhantes
21. Evoque azul (feat. MC Davi)
22. Solta o Grave
