= Caldeirão com Mion =

Brazilian variety show

- Also known as: Caldeirão do Huck (2000-2021); Caldeirão (2021-2022)
- Presented by: Marcos Mion
- Country of origin: Brazil
- Original language: Portuguese

Original release
- Network: TV Globo
- Release: April 8, 2000 – present

Caldeirão com Mion, or simply Caldeirão, is a Brazilian variety show broadcast by TV Globo. Originally premiering in 2000 with Luciano Huck as host, he was succeeded by Marcos Mion on September 4, 2021 after Huck was promoted to the Sunday Domingão com Huck.

== History ==
=== Luciano Huck ===
In September 1999, Rede Globo signed Luciano Huck away from Band (where he had been hosting the variety show Programa H) to host a new Saturday variety show, Caldeirão do Huck. The series premiered on April 8, 2000; initially, Caldeirão was not seen across the entire network, as it aired in a time slot that Globo had set aside for regional programming on some of its affiliates. The following year, Globo removed the regional slot, making Caldeirão a national program.

=== Marcos Mion ===
In June 2021, Globo announced that Fausto Silva had left the network and its long-running Sunday variety show Domingão do Faustão, and that Huck would be promoted to his time slot to host its replacement, Domingão com Huck.

In August 2021, Marcos Mion—who had previously been known for his tenure at MTV Brasil—signed with Globo to host programs on TV Globo and Multishow. Mion was announced the new host of Caldeirão, with Globo initially considering it to be an interim role. In October 2021, after strong ratings performance and critical reception, Mion was named the full-time host.

The show underwent a refresh in March 2022, including officially being re-titled Caldeirão com Mion, adding new mascot characters as assistants (a panda and Globinho), as well as the new segment Caldeirola. For its fourth season in 2024, the show underwent a retool with a new set design and logo, and moves to improve the show's variety with new segments and outside interviews.

== Format and segments ==
Some of the segments introduced upon its premiere included Isso a Globo Mostra (lit. "That Globo Show", where Mion highlights notable moments across Globo programs), and the song guessing game Sobe o Som. Only one segment from Huck's version of the show, Tem ou Não Tem (Family Feud), was maintained (most of Huck's game show segments moved along with him to Domingão com Huck).

== Reception ==
The premiere of Caldeirão was received positively on social media, with viewers considering it to be improved over Huck's tenure, and praising Mion's energy as host. In the IBOPE ratings, the series premiere of Caldeirão received an average rating of 15.9 rating points, and peaked at 20 points—surpassing the viewership of any edition of Caldeirão do Huck, and bringing Globo its highest average viewership on a Saturday since 2019. Its viewership remained steady in the months that followed, usually averaging around 13 points or higher in Greater São Paulo, and beating all other programs in its timeslot.
