= Death of Silvio Santos =

2024 death of the Brazilian presenter

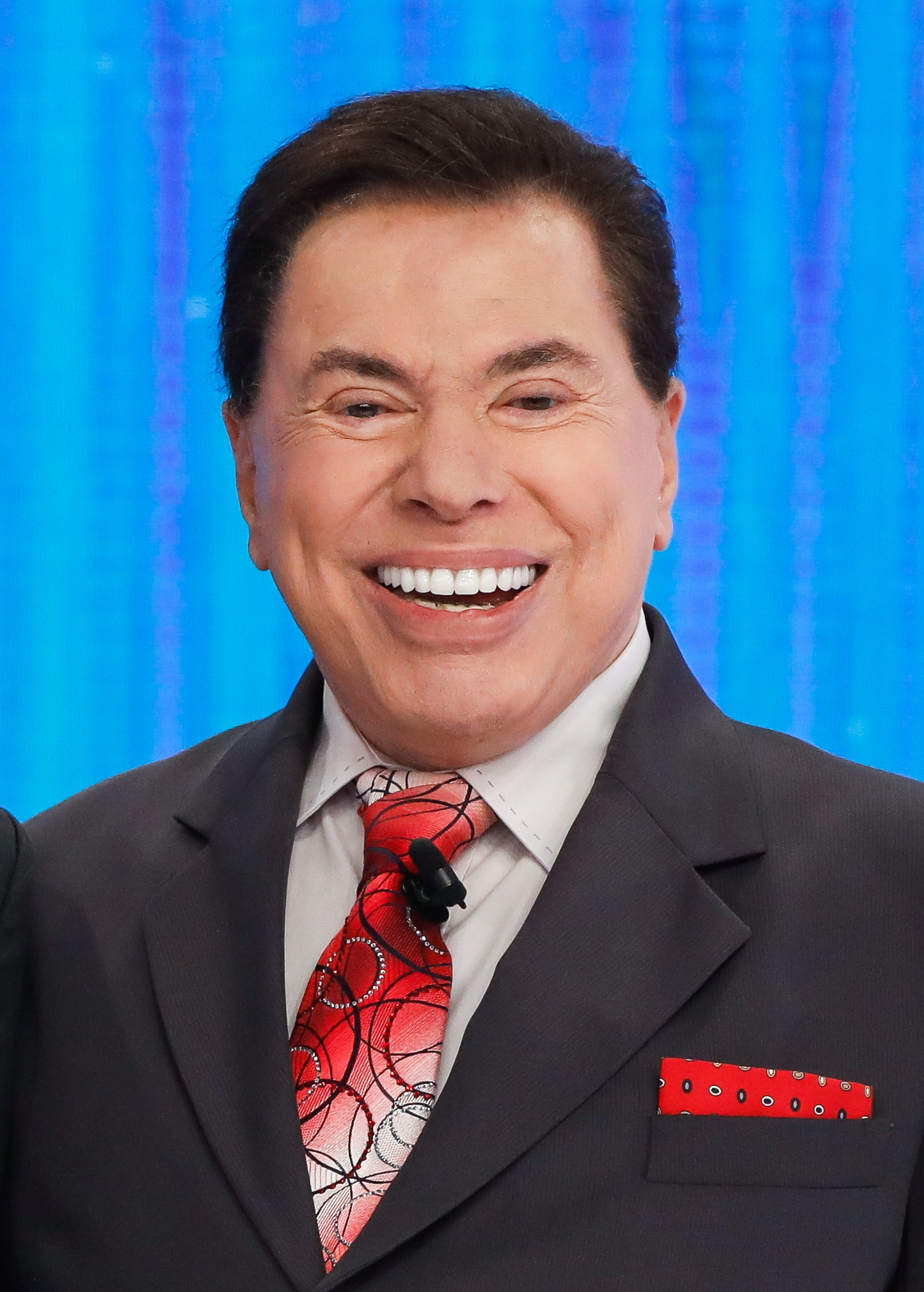
- Silvio Santos in 2019
- Native name: Morte de Sílvio Santos
- Date: August 17, 2024
- Time: 4:50 a.m. (UTC−03:00)
- Location: São Paulo, Brazil; 23°36′02″S 46°42′55″W
- Cause: bronchopneumonia after infection with H1N1

On August 17, 2024, Senor Abravanel, known by the pseudonym Silvio Santos, one of Brazil's most well-known television presenters, died of bronchopneumonia following an influenza infection at the Hospital Israelita Albert Einstein, in São Paulo, at the age of 93.

== Background ==
Silvio Santos had begun to retire from the entertainment industry in 2023, including stepping down as host of his eponymous SBT variety show Programa Silvio Santos in February after sixty years, with his daughter Patricia Abravanel (who had guest hosted the program from October 2021 to April 2022 after Santos was diagnosed with COVID-19) becoming the main host afterward. Santos still planned to make occasional on-air appearances, and did not officially announce a formal retirement.

Santos' health began to show problems on July 18, 2024, when he was taken to the Hospital Israelita Albert Einstein in São Paulo. The information was initially published by Folha de S. Paulo, but the SBT press office denied that the presenter was hospitalized.

Hours later, the press office retracted its statement and said that Silvio Santos had been admitted to hospital to recover from H1N1. In an official statement read out by presenter Michelle Barros on the "Chega Mais" program, SBT said that Silvio was being medicated and that the family was grateful for everyone's affection. On the 20th, he was discharged and returned home.

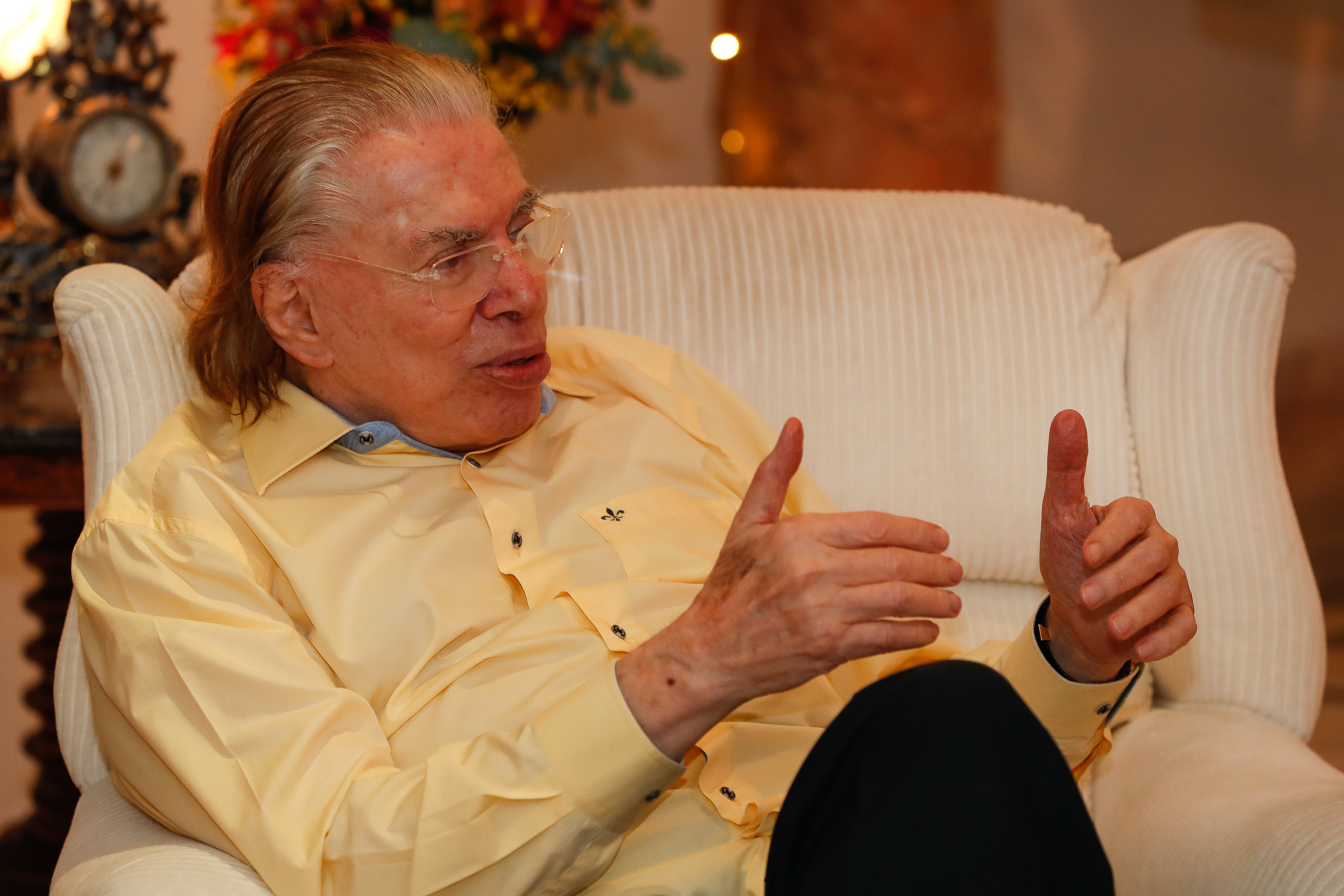
Santos in December 2020

On August 1, he was hospitalized again for imaging tests, according to SBT's press office, and remained hospitalized ever since:

"[He's] fine. He's back for imaging tests, because they do x-rays at home. Imaging tests have to be carried out in hospital"

— Official note from SBT as soon as the second hospitalization was announced., Silvio Santos: SBT confirma internação do apresentador,

Despite the optimistic tone of the information provided by his advisors, the newspaper O Globo reported on August 2 that Silvio Santos' health required greater care from the doctors who were monitoring the evolution of his condition. The family prevented the Albert Einstein Hospital from releasing medical bulletins.

On that occasion, SBT's press office also denied that Silvio was in poor health in an official statement.

"SBT informs that, contrary to what is being speculated in the press, communicator Silvio Santos is not in a critical state of health. Silvio Santos remains in hospital only for the necessary medical care and is being medicated for his speedy recovery".

— "SBT" nega que estado de saúde de Silvio Santos seja crítico,

In an interview with CNN Brasil, Patrícia Abravanel, the communicator's daughter, said on August 5 that the presenter was expected to be discharged soon, although she didn't specify the date:

"He's better, he's getting better. He's even playing a few pranks."

Patrícia also appeared alongside her sister, Rebeca Abravanel, in an interview with Brasil Urgente on Band. During the conversation with reporters Tiago Alberico and Felipe Henrique, both stressed that Silvio was "stable and talking, making jokes and in a good mood".

The last public update on Silvio Santos' state of health was given by his grandson, Tiago Abravanel, during the book signing for Preta Gil's new book on August 14. Tiago revealed that his grandfather was showing signs of improvement and was being well looked after by the hospital's medical team and his family:

"Faith brings a lot of hope. We hope that he'll get well soon."

== Death and announcement ==
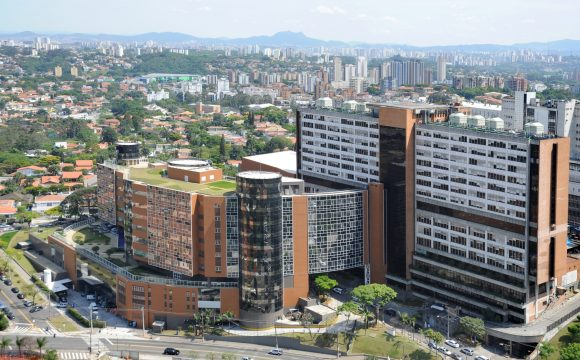
The Albert Einstein Israelite Hospital, where Santos died

The Albert Einstein Israelite Hospital released a medical bulletin confirming the presenter's death at 4.50 a.m. from bronchopneumonia following infection with the H1N1 virus:

"The Hospital Israelita Albert Einstein confirms with regret the death of Senor Abravanel, Silvio Santos, at the age of 93, today, August 17, 2024, at 4:50 a.m., due to bronchopneumonia after infection by influenza (H1N1)."

— Albert Einstein Israelite Hospital

TV Globo broke the news via a special report by Zileide Silva during its Saturday-morning program É de Casa, followed by Record, during the news programme Fala Brasil. As he thought it would bring bad luck, Silvio had asked that an obituary not be made for him in advance. This led to a 90-minute delay from SBT—the network originally founded by Santos—in comparison to its competitors; the network interrupted the showing of the second season premiere of Scooby-Doo and Guess Who?, in its Saturday morning cartoon block Sábado Animado, for a special report by Simone Queiroz:

"We've only interrupted our programming now because we're also managing our grief, the grief of the immense Brazilian family. Now, speaking to the SBT audience eye to eye, to give them the news we never wanted to give them: the death of presenter Silvio Santos at the age of 93."
"Silvio had been in the Albert Einstein hospital since the beginning of the month. Last month, he had already been hospitalized due to the H1N1 virus, the flu virus. He had recovered, returned home, went back to hospital at the beginning of the month, and we had hoped, and Brazil had hoped, that he would recover. But his time has come. It's an immense sorrow".

The Abravanel family released a note to mourn the death of Silvio Santos:

"Colleagues from the auditorium, colleagues of a lifetime, what can we say to you at this time? We believe that many of you are sharing the same sad longing that we are feeling today. We want to tell you that many times throughout his life, as our father got older, he expressed a wish regarding his departure. He asked that as soon as he was gone, we should take him straight to the cemetery and have a Jewish ceremony. He asked that we not exploit his passing. He liked to be celebrated in life and would like to be remembered with the joy he experienced."
"He asked us to respect his wishes. And so we will. For this reason, we ask for your understanding. To remember all the good things he did and the many joys he brought us over the years. He was very happy with everything he did. And he always did everything from the bottom of his heart. He loved Brazil and Brazilians."

At Silvio Santos' request, there was no funeral service and his burial, in an Israeli cemetery in São Paulo, followed all the traditional rites of Judaism, the presenter's religion.

== Reactions ==
Following the news of the presenter's death, several television stations interrupted their schedules to inform the public of the loss. In a short time, celebrities and organizations expressed their grief, sending messages of mourning and highlighting the legacy left by Silvio Santos.

=== Brazil ===
Several artists and friends spoke and paid tribute to Silvio, among them Eliana, Rodrigo Faro, Carlos Alberto de Nóbrega, Priscilla, Celso Portiolli, Yudi Tamashiro, among others.

Carlos Alberto de Nóbrega said:

"Goodbye, friend. It's been 70 years of friendship and a sad longing that will last forever."

Fausto Silva, Faustão, said in an official statement released by his press office:

"Like Pelé and Ayrton Senna, Silvio Santos left a legacy and a mark, the true and only king of TV. In addition to his extraordinary talent, his life story is full of persistence, personality, focus and creativity. He left an exceptional contribution to Brazilian TV. He will be sorely missed."

His son, João Guilherme Silva, also spoke out:

"Today Brazil says goodbye to a legend of Brazilian television, a sadness for everyone and especially for those of us who work in communications. Unfortunately I didn't have the pleasure of meeting him, but his memory as a communicator will remain in my heart. May God comfort the hearts of this wonderful family that I love and admire so much!"

Actress Larissa Manoela said:

"If I am who I am today, it's because back then you also trusted me and believed in my dedication and my ability to be a better artist."

Maisa Silva, who also began her career at the hands of Silvio Santos, also paid tribute to him:

"Not in my wildest dreams could I have imagined that one of the greatest communicators in the history of the nation would be my boss. Much less that he would have a Corinthian heart... And that it would be Silvio Santos. Silvio gave wings to my dream, which was to present a TV show. 'But a five-year-old? Presenting a live program? Do merchan reading TP [teleprompter]? For him, none of this was impossible. It might have been unusual, but Silvio liked it. He saw things that other people didn't see. And being our boss, he wasn't often afraid to put these plans into action. And that's good, right?"

The Brazilian President Luiz Inácio Lula da Silva decreed three days of official mourning in the country in honor of the presenter and said on his social networks:

"Silvio Santos was the greatest personality in the history of Brazilian television, and one of the country's greatest communicators. A native of Rio de Janeiro, the son of immigrants, Senor Abravanel was an entrepreneur who began life as a street vendor and went on to build a large TV network and companies in the most diverse sectors: financial, industrial and commercial. But he will always be remembered as Silvio Santos, the face and voice of Sundays for millions of Brazilians, beloved by his "coworkers", as he affectionately called his female viewers. With his talent and charisma, he launched and supported many talents in television, humor and journalism. He was one of the best-known and best-loved people in our country. Over the years, we met on TV programs, meetings and conversations, always with respect and affection. His departure leaves a void in Brazilian television and marks the end of an era in the country's communication. My condolences and sympathy go to his wife, his six daughters, all his family members, friends, employees of his companies and fans throughout Brazil."

On TV Globo's É de Casa, Ana Maria Braga said:

"I think Silvio Santos permeated our youth. I didn't even know at the time that I wanted to be a television presenter, but I've always been Silvio Santos' number one fan."

Boni, former director of Globo, spoke out about the death of Silvio Santos:

"One of the greatest presenters in the world, the way he presents and conducts his program is unparalleled, an international model."

— Boni in an interview with the broadcaster.

Former president Jair Bolsonaro said on his social networks:

"Today Sílvio Santos leaves us, an example of joy and entrepreneurship for all of us. A simple man, easy to get along with, with an irresistible charisma."

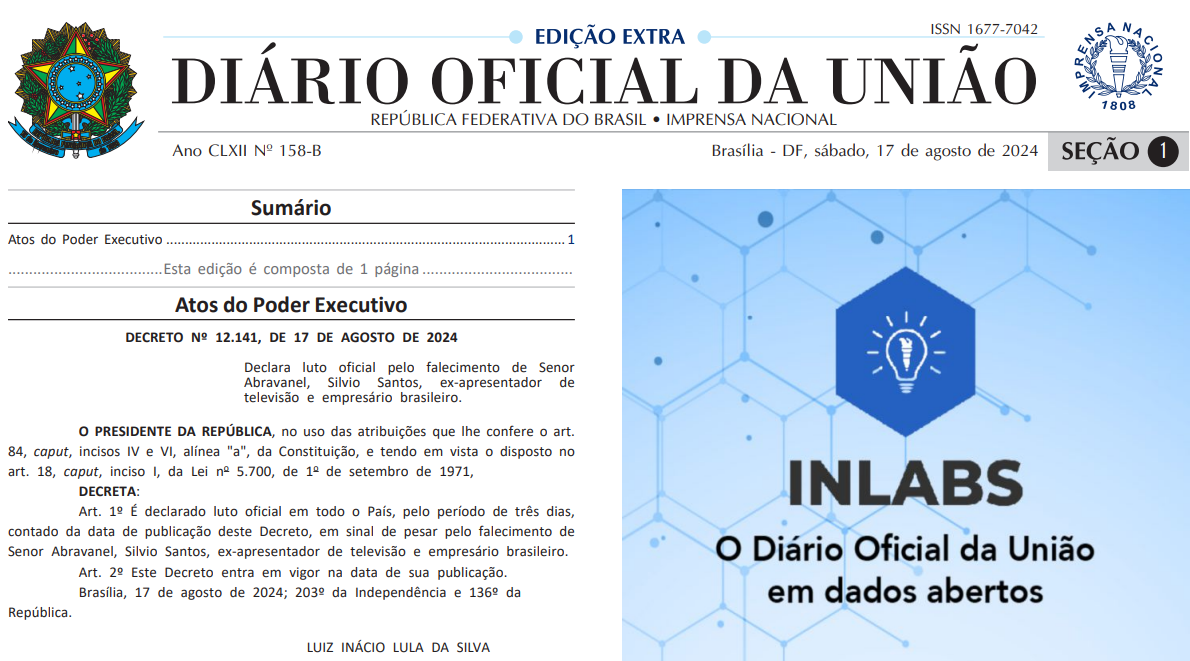
Publication in an extra edition of the Official Gazette decreeing national mourning for the death of Silvio Santos.

SBT's long-time rival TV Globo would pre-empt the sport news programme Globo Esporte, a rerun of the telenovela Cheias de Charme and the movie block Sessão de Sábado (which would have shown the film The Parent Trap) for a special edition of Jornal Nacional covering Santos' death. It was presented by César Tralli and Renata Vasconcellos. On August 18, Globo's Sunday variety show Domingão com Huck aired a special edition with tributes to Santos, featuring SBT alumni Angélica, Lívia Andrade, and Larissa Manoela appearing as guests.

The Brazilian Football Confederation has decided to call the match between Fluminense and Corinthians the Clássico Silvio Santos (Silvio Santos Derby). The presenter was a fan of the Laranjeiras club, but among the carnival marches that Silvio performed is the song "Transplante de Corinthiano", one of the hits from his albums.

=== International ===
The Argentinian newspaper Clarín described the presenter as "one of the greatest figures on Brazilian TV", and someone who had "performed like no one else with his personal skill and self-confidence, capturing the attention of the masses in front of the screen". Argentina's La Nación referred to him as a "legend of Brazilian entertainment" and highlighted his timelessness—managing to renew his programs over the years, and his hair never going gray. In Paraguay, ABC Color wrote that "(Santos) was always one of the big names on the Sunday program, where he performed like no one else with his talent for dealing with people and his daring, capturing the attention of the masses".
