= Deolane Bezerra =

Brazilian lawyer, singer, and influencer

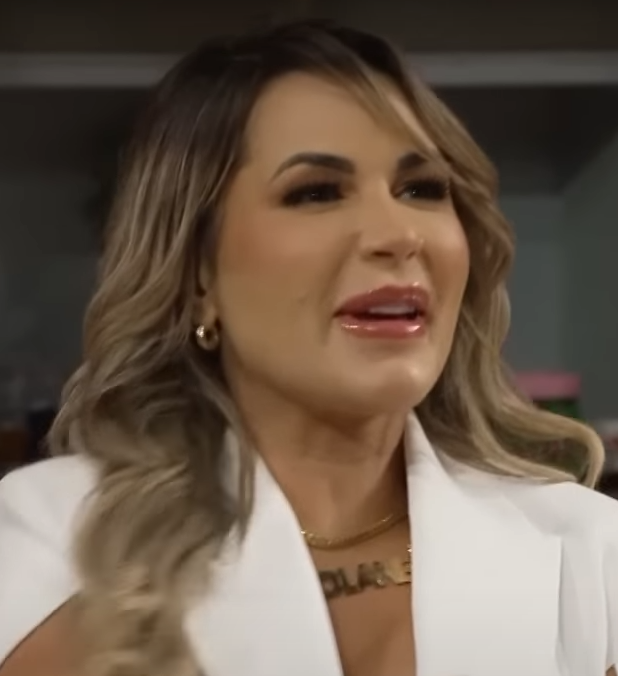
- Born: Deolane Bezerra Santos; November 1, 1987 (age 38); Vitória de Santo Antão, Pernambuco, Brazil
- Other name: Bafuda
- Education: Universidade Cidade de São Paulo
- Occupations: lawyer; digital influencer; former singer
- Spouse: MC Kevin (m. 2021–2021)
- Children: Gilliard Bezerra; Kayky Bezerra; Valentina Bezerra
- Mother: Solange Bezerra

Deolane Bezerra Santos (born November 1, 1987) is a Brazilian lawyer, former singer and influencer. She became known after the death of her husband, MC Kevin, who died after falling from the balcony of a hotel in Rio de Janeiro in 2021. She gained wide international and national notoriety due to her involvement in high-profile police operations investigating money laundering, gambling, and criminal organizations, which culminated in multiple preventative arrests between 2024 and 2026.

== Biography ==
Daughter of Solange Bezerra, she was born on November 1, 1987, in Vitória de Santo Antão, Pernambuco. She has two sisters, Dayanne and Daniele Bezerra. She was abandoned by her father at the age of two. During childhood, her family moved to São Paulo. At just 16 years old, she adopted her first child, Gilliard, an adoption that was only made official in 2022. She had her second child, her first biological child, Kayky, during her first year of law school, completed in 2021 at Universidade Cidade de São Paulo, during a two-year relationship. She had her third daughter, Valentina, during her second relationship, which lasted eight years.

She was registered with the Order of Attorneys of Brazil on April 25, 2014, and specialized in criminal law at the Federal University of Pernambuco.

== Legal issues ==
In July 2022, she was subject to a search and seizure warrant following a decision by the Public Ministry on suspicion of criminal association and money laundering.

In February 2024, she began to be investigated by the Rio de Janeiro State Civil Police on suspicion of involvement with criminal factions, having already been accused of advocating for the Primeiro Comando da Capital (PCC).

=== Operation Integration (2024) ===
In September 2024, she was arrested during Operation "Integration," conducted by the Pernambuco Civil Police, which investigated a criminal organization involved in money laundering and illegal gambling. In addition to Deolane, her mother, Solange Bezerra, was also detained, and 17 other arrest warrants were executed in different states. The operation resulted in the seizure of assets, including luxury cars, real estate, and aircraft, and the blocking of financial assets worth R$2.1 billion (Brazilian Reais). Her mother was also arrested and is being investigated for involvement in drug trafficking.

The investigation revealed suspicious financial movements in accounts linked to the Bezerra family, including large transfers to the account of Kayky Bezerra, Deolane's son. Solange Bezerra, the influencer's mother, was accused of carrying out these transactions, raising suspicions that the account was used for money laundering.

The lawyer was released through a writ of habeas corpus due to having a daughter that was under the age of twelve, but was subsequently detained again for violating the conditional release terms.

Even under investigation, the digital influencer and lawyer continued to deny any wrongdoing. Her defense claimed persecution and abuse of authority in the actions against her and her family.

On the evening of September 23, 2024, the Pernambuco Court of Justice (TJPE) ordered the release of 17 suspects arrested, including influencer Deolane Bezerra, her mother Solange Bezerra, and the owner of Esportes da Sorte, Darwin Henrique da Silva Filho, as part of Operation Integration. On the afternoon of the following day, Deolane left the Buíque Women's Penal Colony in the Pernambuco countryside, where she had been imprisoned since September 10. On the afternoon of September 25, influencer Deolane Bezerra arrived in the state capital of São Paulo.

=== Operation Vérnix (2026) ===
On May 21, 2026, Deolane Bezerra was preventively arrested again in Barueri, São Paulo, during Operation Vérnix. Conducted by the Public Ministry of São Paulo (MP-SP), through the Special Action Group to Combat Organized Crime (GAECO), alongside the Civil Police, the operation targeted an intricate financial mechanism utilized for money laundering and concealment of assets directly associated with the leadership of the criminal faction Primeiro Comando da Capital (PCC).

The investigation originated from prison intelligence gathered in 2019 at the Presidente Venceslau Penitenciária II, where intercepted letters detailed threats against public officials and a logistics transport network used to move illicit capital. Authorities established that a transport company served as a shell front to integrate money derived from international drug trafficking into the formal economy. Following the seizure of cell phones belonging to the organization's financial operators—including an individual identified as Everton ("Player")—investigators uncovered explicit transaction logs and communications detailing structured fractional deposits routed directly into bank accounts owned by Deolane Bezerra. Financial intelligence modules alleged that she received over R$1 million in undeclared assets related to the scheme between 2018 and 2021.

The operation listed Bezerra within the same high-tier organizational chart as the faction's supreme leader, Marcos Willians Herbas Camacho ("Marcola"), whose immediate relatives managing assets in Europe and Bolivia were also targeted. Prior to her apprehension at her residence in Alphaville, Bezerra's name had been placed on Interpol's Red Notice tracking system during a trip to Rome, Italy. The courts ordered a total asset freeze of R$357.5 million among the suspects, with R$27 million specifically seized from Bezerra's holdings, alongside multiple luxury vehicles.

Bezerra was initially held at the Santana Women's Penitentiary in São Paulo before being transferred to a specific lawyer-designated cell at Tupi Paulista in the state's interior. Her legal defense filed petitions to convert her preventative detention into house arrest citing her underaged daughter, while claiming that the transactions were entirely legitimate attorney fees acquired during her professional practice as a criminal defense lawyer. Concurrently, the Public Ministry initiated judicial procedures to evaluate the permanent suspension of her social media channels on the basis that public displays of high-end asset accumulation supported by illicit schemes could constitute the public apology of crime.
