= Marcos Mion =

Brazilian television presenter

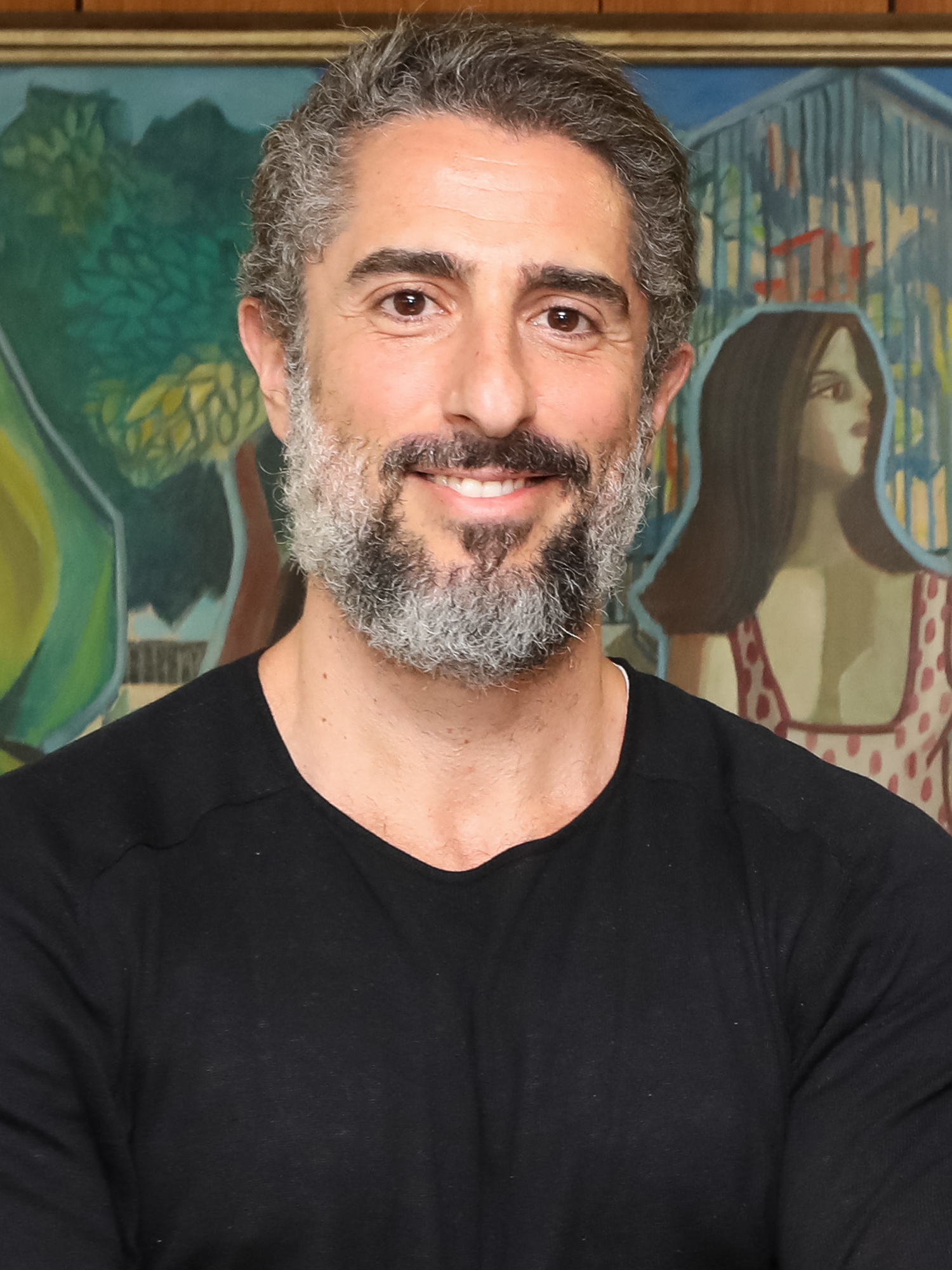
- Marcos Mion in 2019.
- Born: June 20, 1979 (age 46); São Paulo, Brazil
- Occupations: Tv host, actor, voice actor, businessman

Marcos Chaib Mion (born June 20, 1979, in São Paulo) is a Brazilian TV host, actor, voice actor, author and businessman (Partner of V.Rom). Mion studied Philosophy at Universidade de São Paulo, and later graduated in Communication and Body Arts at Pontifícia Universidade Católica de São Paulo. Currently, Mion presents the show Caldeirão com Mion, which is shown on Saturday afternoons on TV Globo.

== Career ==
He started his career on TV as an actor in 1999, on the Rede Globo's show Sandy e Júnior. In 2000, he went to work on MTV Brasil, hosting the shows Supernova and Piores Clipes do Mundo (Worst Videos in the World, in Portuguese). With the success of the latter, Mion was hired by Rede Bandeirantes in 2002, where he hosted the show Descontrole, known for a lot of live improvisation.

He later returned to MTV Brasil, hosting the shows Covernation, The Nadas, Mucho Macho, Descarga MTV, and Quinta Categoria.

In 2006, he portrayed Emílio Redenção in Rede Record's telenovela Bicho do Mato. Later, in 2010, his work with the network continued as he started to host his own show Legendários, which as of December 2016 is still ongoing. Also, he is a blogger of R7.

Through the years, he has also had acting roles in plays, appearances in film, and has also served as director for music videos.

In 2021, Mion joined Globo; in September 2021, Mion would succeed Luciano Huck as host of its Saturday variety show Caldeirão. Mion was intended to serve as an interim host for the program until March 2022. However, in October 2021, after his tenure resulted in a positive response and viewership gains, Mion was made the full-time host. Mion has also contributed to music festival coverage for sister network Multishow, including Rock in Rio and Lollapalooza Brasil.

== Personal life ==
In 1994, his older brother, Marcelo, died after an accident at the São Paulo Museum of Art, in which he fell in the ground-level plaza under the building's sizeable free span. This event lead Mion to a deep depression and drug addiction.

Mion married to Suzana Gullo in 2005. They have three children: Romeo, Donatella and Stefano (age 5).

Mion is an advocate for his autistic son, Romeo. In 2016, Mion wrote a Christmas book about his son. Later, in 2019, Mion published an English social media message, with a translation in the caption: "Autism is not a disease, do not try to 'cure us', try to understand us."

Mion is a devout Roman Catholic.

== Awards and nominations ==
Year	Award	Categories	Result
2018	UOL TV and Famous Award	Best Presenter "critics"	Won
2018	UOL TV and Famous Award	Best Presenter "Public"	Won
