= Pabllo Vittar discography =

Brazilian singer and drag queen discography

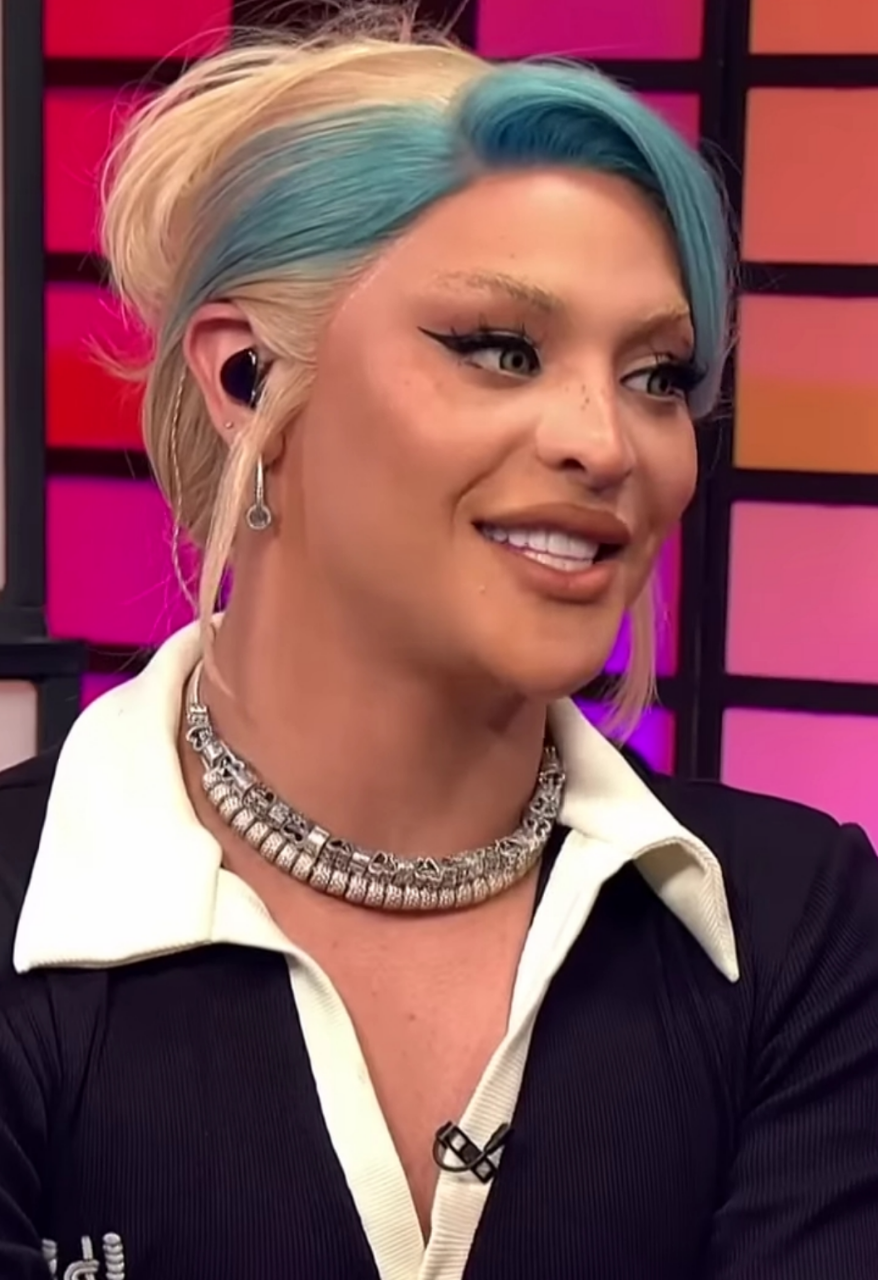
- Vittar in 2024
- Studio albums: 6
- EPs: 3
- Live albums: 1
- Singles: 36
- Music videos: 9

Brazilian singer and drag queen Pabllo Vittar has released six studio albums, three extended plays, one live album and thirty-six singles.

In December 2015, Vittar released his debut EP, Open Bar produced by Rodrigo Gorky, Maffalda and Omulu. The title track, "Minaj" and "Amante" were released as singles. The music video for "Open Bar" reached 1 million views on YouTube in only one month. The material brought Vittar media attention.

In January 2017, Vittar released his first studio album, Vai Passar Mal. Among the achievements, Vittar has become the most successful drag queen of all digital platforms. The second single from the album, "Todo Dia", became the theme of 2017 Brazilian Carnival. The third single from the album, "K.O.", surpassed the success of "Todo Dia" and made Vittar the first drag queen to enter the Brazilian charts, reaching number 67 on Brazil's Hot 100 Airplay.

== Albums ==
=== Studio albums ===
Title	Details	Certifications
Vai Passar Mal	Released: January 10, 2017; Label: BMT, Sony Brazil; Format: CD, digital download	PMB: 2× Platinum
Não Para Não	Released: October 4, 2018; Label: Sony Brazil, Mataderos; Format: CD, digital download	PMB: Platinum
111	Released: March 24, 2020; Label: Sony Brazil; Format: Digital download, streaming	PMB: 2× Platinum
Batidão Tropical	Released: June 24, 2021; Label: Mataderos; Format: Digital download, streaming	PMB: Gold
Noitada	Released: February 8, 2023; Label: Mataderos; Format: Digital download, streaming	
Batidão Tropical Vol. 2	Released: April 9, 2024; Label: Sony Brazil; Format: Digital download, streaming	

=== Live albums ===
Title	Details
I am Pabllo	Released: December 14, 2021; Label: Sony Music; Format: Digital download

=== Remix albums ===
Title	Details
Vai Passar Mal: Remixes	Released: December 8, 2017; Label: BMT, Sony Music Brasil; Format: Digital download
NPN Remixes	Released: May 10, 2019; Label: BMT, Sony Music Brasil; Format: Digital download
111 Deluxe	Released: November 26, 2020; Label: Sony Music Brasil; Format: Digital download

== Extended plays ==
Title	Details
Open Bar	Released: December 2, 2015; Label: ONErpm; Format: Digital download
Up Next Session: Pabllo Vittar	Released: January 11, 2018; Label: BMT, Sony Music Brasil; Format: Streaming
111 1	Released: November 1, 2019; Label: BMT, Sony Music Brasil; Format: Streaming

== Singles ==
=== As lead artist ===
List of singles as lead artist, with selected chart positions, showing year released and album name
Title	Year	Peak chart positions										Certifications	Album
Title	Year	BRA	BRA Airplay	BRA Pop	CAN	CHI	POR	SWI	US	US Latin Pop Digital	WW	Certifications	Album
"Open Bar"	2015	—	—	—	—	—	—	—	—	—	—	PMB: Gold	Open Bar
"Nêga"	2016	—	—	—	—	—	—	—	—	—	—	PMB: Gold	Vai Passar Mal
"Todo Dia" (featuring Rico Dalasam)	2017	—	—	—	—	—	—	—	—	—	—		Vai Passar Mal
"K.O."	2017	20	64	8	—	—	—	—	—	—	—	PMB: Diamond	Vai Passar Mal
"Corpo Sensual" (featuring Mateus Carrilho)	2017	5	67	9	—	—	—	—	—	—	—	PMB: 2× Diamond	Vai Passar Mal
"Então Vai" (featuring Diplo)	2018	—	—	—	—	—	—	—	—	—	—		Vai Passar Mal
"Indestrutível"	2018	—	—	—	—	—	—	—	—	—	—	PMB: Platinum	Vai Passar Mal
"Problema Seu"	2018	37	—	—	—	—	—	—	—	—	—	PMB: Diamond	Não Para Não
"Disk Me"	2018	33	—	—	—	—	—	—	—	—	—	PMB: Diamond	Não Para Não
"Seu Crime"	2019	—	—	—	—	—	—	—	—	—	—	PMB: 2× Platinum	Não Para Não
"Buzina"	2019	—	—	—	—	—	—	—	—	—	—	PMB: 2× Platinum	Não Para Não
"Flash Pose" (featuring Charli XCX)	2019	—	—	—	—	—	—	—	—	—	—	PMB: 2× Platinum	111
"Parabéns" (featuring Psirico)	2019	24	—	—	—	—	—	—	—	—	—	PMB: Diamond	111
"Amor de Que"	2019	14	—	—	—	—	145	—	—	—	—	PMB: 2× Diamond	111
"Clima Quente" (featuring Jerry Smith)	2020	—	—	—	—	—	—	—	—	—	—	PMB: Gold	111
"Tímida" (with Thalía)	2020	—	—	—	—	9	—	—	—	13	—	PMB: Platinum	111
"Rajadão"	2020	—	—	—	—	—	—	—	—	—	—	PMB: Platinum	111
"Bandida" (featuring Pocah)	2020	—	—	—	—	—	—	—	—	—	—	PMB: 2× Platinum	111
"Modo Turbo" (with Luísa Sonza featuring Anitta)	2020	3	—	—	—	—	7	—	—	—	126	AFP: Gold	Doce 22
"Ama Sofre Chora"	2021	—	—	—	—	—	—	—	—	—	—	PMB: Platinum	Batidão Tropical
"Triste Com T"	2021	42	—	—	—	—	178	—	—	—	—	PMB: Platinum	Batidão Tropical
"Bang Bang"	2021	—	—	—	—	—	—	—	—	—	—		Batidão Tropical
"Number One" (featuring Rennan da Penha)	2021	—	—	—	—	—	—	—	—	—	—		Non-album singles
"Follow Me" (featuring Rina Sawayama)	2022	—	—	—	—	—	—	—	—	—	—		Non-album singles
"Descontrolada" (featuring MC Carol)	2022	—	—	—	—	—	—	—	—	—	—		Noitada
"Ameianoite" (featuring Gloria Groove)	2022	—	—	—	—	—	—	—	—	—	—		Noitada
"Cadeado"	2023	—	—	—	—	—	—	—	—	—	—		Noitada
"Pede pra Eu Ficar (Listen to Your Heart)	2024	—	—	—	—	—	—	—	—	—	—		Batidão Tropical Vol. 2
"Ai Ai Ai Mega Príncipe"	2024	—	—	—	—	—	—	—	—	—	—		Batidão Tropical Vol. 2
"Idiota"	2024	—	—	—	—	—	—	—	—	—	—		Batidão Tropical Vol. 2
"Alibi" (with Sevdaliza and Yseult)	2024	16	—	—	46	—	38	70	95	—	15		Heroina
"Hoje à Noite"	2024	—	—	—	—	—	—	—	—	—	—		Non-album singles
"Ai Que Calor"	2024	—	—	—	—	—	—	—	—	—	—		Non-album singles
"Vira Lata"	2024	—	—	—	—	—	—	—	—	—	—		Non-album singles
"Fantasía"	2025	—	—	—	—	—	—	—	—	—	—		Non-album singles
"Mexe" (with Nmixx)	2025	—	—	—	—	—	—	—	—	—	—		Non-album singles
"Rockstar"	2026	—	—	—	—	—	—	—	—	—	—		Lost in Lust
"Body Type"	2026	—	—	—	—	—	—	—	—	—	—		Lost in Lust
"—" denotes a recording that did not chart or was not released in that territory.

=== As featured artist ===
List of singles as featured artist, with selected chart positions, showing year released and album name
Title	Year	Peak chart positions						Certifications	Album
Title	Year	BRA	BRA Airplay	ARG	POR	US Dance	VEN	Certifications	Album
"Tome Curtindo" (Remix) (Lia Clark featuring Pabllo Vittar)	2017	—	—	—	—	—	—		Non-album single
"Sua Cara" (Major Lazer featuring Anitta and Pabllo Vittar)	2017	12	49	—	8	26	61	AFP: Platinum	Know No Better
"Decote" (Preta Gil featuring Pabllo Vittar)	2017	—	—	—	—	—	—	PMB: Gold	Todas as Cores
"Joga Bunda" (Aretuza Lovi featuring Pabllo Vittar and Gloria Groove)	2018	—	—	—	—	—	—		Mercadinho
"Paraíso" (Lucas Lucco with Pabllo Vittar)	2018	41	—	—	—	—	—		Non-album single
"Eu Te Avisei" (Alice Caymmi with Pabllo Vittar)	2018	—	—	—	—	—	—		Alice
"Não Esqueço" (NIARA with Pabllo Vittar)	2018	—	—	—	—	—	—		Non-album single
"Come e Baza (Remix)" (Titica featuring Pabllo Vittar)	2018	—	—	—	—	—	—		Pra Quê Julgar?
"Energia (Parte 2)" (Sofi Tukker with Pabllo Vittar)	2018	—	—	—	—	—	—		Non-album single
"Caliente" (Lali featuring Pabllo Vittar)	2018	—	—	51	—	—	—	PMB: Gold	Brava
"Garupa" (with Luísa Sonza)	2019	29	—	—	—	—	—	Pandora	
"Comme Des Garçons (Like the Boys) (Brabo Remix)" (Rina Sawayama featuring Pabllo Vittar)	2020	—	—	—	—	—	—		Sawayama Remixed
"Lento (Brabo Remix)" (Lauren Jauregui featuring Pabllo Vittar)	2021	—	—	—	—	—	—		Non-album single
"Cavalgada" (Lexa featuring Pabllo Vittar)	2022	—	—	—	—	—	—		Magnéticah
"She Can Dance (Brabo Remix)" (Betty Who featuring Pabllo Vittar)	2022	—	—	—	—	—	—		Non-album singles
"S de Saudade (Remix)" (Vitão featuring Pabllo Vittar)	2022	—	—	—	—	—	—		Non-album singles
"Sal" (Pedro Sampaio featuring Pabllo Vittar)	2022	—	—	—	—	—	—		Non-album singles
"Pearls (Pabllo Vittar & Brabo Remix)" (Jessie Ware featuring Pabllo Vittar)	2023	—	—	—	—	—	—		Non-album singles
"Tic Tic" (Nmixx featuring Pabllo Vittar)	2026	To be released							Non-album singles
"—" denotes a recording that did not chart or was not released in that territory.

=== Promotional singles ===
Title	Year	Album
"Rainha"	2016	Open Bar
"Filhos do Arco-íris" (featuring various artists^{[A]})	2017	Non-album singles
"Hasta La Vista" (with Luan Santana and Simone & Simaria)	2018	Non-album singles
"Highlight" (featuring Super Drags)	2018	Non-album singles

== Guest appearances ==
List of other appearances, showing year released and album name
Title	Year	Other artist(s)	Album
"I Got It"	2017	Charli XCX, Brooke Candy, CupcakKe	Pop 2
"Shake It"	2019	Charli XCX, Big Freedia, Brooke Candy, Cupcakke	Charli
"The Girls"	2019	Iggy Azalea	Wicked Lips
"Man's World" (Empress Of Remix)	2021	Marina	Non-album song
"Fun Tonight" (Pabllo Vittar Remix)	2021	Lady Gaga	Dawn of Chromatica
"Everybody"	2022	Honey Dijon, Urias	Black Girl Magic

== Music videos ==
Title	Release	Director
"Open Bar"	2015	Leocádio Rezende
"Minaj"	2016	Leocádio Rezende
"Amante"	2016	Leocádio Rezende
"Nêga"	2016	Sandrow Almeidan, Pabllo Vittar, Leocádio Rezende
"Todo Dia" (featuring Rico Dalasam)	2017	Guilherme Batista, Fabrício Sassioto
"K.O."	2017	João Monteiro
"Corpo Sensual" (featuring Mateus Carrilho)	2017	João Monteiro, Fernando Moraes
"Paraíso" (with Lucas Lucco)	2018	João Monteiro, Fernando Moraes
"Então Vai" (featuring Diplo)	2018	Hick Duarte
"Indestrutível"	2018	Bruno Ilogti
"Hasta La Vista" (with Luan Santana & Simone e Simaria)	2018	Bruno Ilogti
"Não Esqueço" (with NIARA)	2018	Pedro Alvarenga
"Problema Seu"	2018	Os Primos
"Energia" (Parte 2) (with Sofi Tukker)	2018	James Rothman, Pete Quandt
"Disk Me"	2018	Os Primos
"Highlight" (featuring Super Drags)	2018	Bruno Ilogti
"Seu Crime"	2019	Guilherme Nabhan, Louise W. Freshel
"Buzina"	2019	Os Primos
"Não Vou Deitar"	2019	Mayra Oliveira
"Garupa" (with Luísa Sonza)	2019	Os Primos
"Flash Pose" (featuring Charli XCX)	2019	Tragik
"Sente a Conexão" (featuring MC Kekel)	2019	Kaique Alves
"Parabéns" (featuring Psirico)	2019	Pabllo Vittar, Flávio Verne
"Follow Me" (with Rina Sawayama)	2022	Amber Park
