= Não Para Não =

Studio album by Pabllo Vittar
- Released: October 4, 2018
- Recorded: March–September 2018
- Genres: Pop; axé; forró
- Length: 26:06
- Labels: Sony Music; Matadeiros
- Producers: Rodrigo Gorky; Maffalda; Zebu; Pablo Bispo; Arthur Marques; Filip Nikolić; Noize Men; Junior Fernandes

Pabllo Vittar chronology
Up Next Session: Pabllo Vittar (2018)	Não Para Não (2018)	NPN Remixes (2019)

Singles from Não Para Não
- 1. "Problema Seu" Released: August 15, 2018; 2. "Disk Me" Released: October 5, 2018; 3. "Seu Crime" Released: February 4, 2019; 4. "Buzina" Released: February 26, 2019

Não Para Não (English: Don't Stop) is the second studio album by Brazilian singer and drag queen Pabllo Vittar, released on October 4, 2018, through Sony Music Brasil. The album features Urias, Dilsinho and Ludmilla. The first single is "Problema Seu", released on August 15, 2018.

It features various Brazilian rhythms such as forró, tecnobrega, axé, among others just like Vittar's debut album.

It was ranked as the 5th best Brazilian album of 2018 by the Brazilian edition of Rolling Stone magazine and among the 25 best Brazilian albums of the second half of 2018 by the São Paulo Association of Art Critics.

== Concept ==
On the cover of the album, Vittar is presented as a "goddess of technology", according to the artist herself. The image is a "modern deity that attracts and unifies rhythms, ideas, cultures and languages of a rich and multifaceted Brazil."

== Singles ==
The first single, "Problema Seu", was accompanied by a 2D-8 bit game, where guest appearances by Urias, Dilsinho and Ludmilla on the album were revealed. The singer revealed the title and the cover one week before the release, during her participation at the 2018 Multishow Awards.

The second single, "Disk Me", was released one day after the album's release. The music video contained a phone number, displayed on a cell phone in one of the opening scenes. By contacting this number, one could receive different messages from Vittar, depending on the medium of contact; by voice, or via WhatsApp.

== Commercial performance ==
In less than two hours after its release, "Não Para Não" debuted at the top of Brazilian iTunes. The album debuted on Spotify Brazil with 3,132,633 streams, being the best debut by an album on the platform in 2018, surpassing albums by foreign artists such as Camila Cabello. In addition to this feat, all the tracks of the album debuted in the top 40 and top 50 of Spotify and Apple Music, respectively. "Não Para Não" became the only Brazilian album to chart all its tracks on Spotify's most listened list.

== Track listing ==
All tracks produced by Brabo Music Team and Nikolić, except "Miragem" (produced by Brabo and Junior Fernandes) and "Problema Seu" (produced also by Noize Men).

No.	Title	Writer(s)	Length
1.	"Buzina"	Pabllo Vittar; Maffalda; Zebu; Rodrigo Gorky; Pablo Bispo; Arthur Marques	2:17
2.	"Seu Crime"	Diplo; King Henry; Jr. Blender; Maffalda; Zebu; Gorky; Bispo; Marques	2:34
3.	"Problema Seu"	Alice Caymmi; Noize Men; Maffalda; Zebu; Gorky; Bispo; Marques	2:42
4.	"Disk Me"	Diego Timbó; Maffalda; Zebu; Gorky; Bispo; Marques	2:53
5.	"Não Vou Deitar"	Maffalda; Zebu; Gorky; Bispo; Marques	2:17
6.	"Ouro" (featuring Urias)	Filip Nikolić; Maffalda; Zebu; Gorky; Bispo; Marques	2:33
7.	"Trago seu Amor de Volta" (featuring Dilsinho)	Maffalda; Zebu; Gorky; Bispo; Marques	2:38
8.	"Vai Embora" (featuring Ludmilla)	Ludmilla; Rafa Dias; Maffalda; Zebu; Gorky; Bispo; Marques	2:37
9.	"No Hablo Español"	Maffalda; Zebu; Gorky; Bispo; Marques; Nikolić	2:46
10.	"Miragem"	Junior Fernandes; Maffalda; Zebu; Gorky; Bispo; Marques	2:49
Total length:			26:06

== Release history ==
Region	Date	Format(s)	Label(s)
Worldwide	October 4, 2018	Digital download; streaming	Sony Music

== Certifications ==
Region	Certification	Certified units/sales
Brazil (Pro-Música Brasil)	Platinum	80,000^{‡}
^{‡} Sales+streaming figures based on certification alone.

== Não Para Não Tour ==
Não Para Não Tour
- Tour by Pabllo Vittar
- Location: South America • North America • Europe
- Associated albums: Não Para Não
- Start date: November 1, 2018
- End date: April 24, 2019
- Legs: 3
- No. of shows: 21 in South America; 9 in North America; 3 in Europe; 33 in total

Pabllo Vittar concert chronology
- Vai Passar Mal Tour (2017–2018); Não Para Não Tour (2018–2019)

The Não Para Não Tour was a headlining concert tour by Brazilian singer Pabllo Vittar, in support of her second studio album, Não Para Não (2018). The tour began on November 1, 2018, in São Paulo at Cine Joia.

=== Set list ===
Set list
1. "Buzina"
2. "Problema Seu"
3. "Tara"
4. "Ele é o Tal"
5. "Nêga"
6. "No Chão"
7. "Rainha"
8. "Minaj" / "Miragem"
9. "Open Bar"
10. "Energia (Parte 2)" / "I Got It" / "Eu Te Avisei" / "Tome Curtindo" / "Joga Bunda" / "Caliente" / "Sua Cara"
11. "Disk Me"
12. "Indestrutível"
13. "Não Vou Deitar"
14. "No Hablo Español"
15. "Trago seu Amor de Volta"
16. "Vai Embora"
17. "K.O."
18. "Então Vai" (with elements of "Baby Boy" by Beyoncé)
19. "Ouro"
20. "Corpo Sensual"
21. "Seu Crime"
22. "Buzina" (bis)
Notes
- During the shows in Salvador and São Paulo, Vittar was joined onstage by Lali to perform "Caliente". Lali also performed "Tu Revolución" and "Mi Religión" alone.

=== Shows ===
List of concerts, showing date, city, country and venue
Date	City	Country	Venue
South America
November 1, 2018	São Paulo	Brazil	Cine Joia
November 2, 2018	São Paulo	Brazil	Cine Joia
November 8, 2018	São Paulo	Brazil	MCT Spotify
November 10, 2018	Vinhedo	Brazil	Hopi Hari
November 14, 2018	Fortaleza	Brazil	Marina Park Hotel
November 24, 2018	Porto Alegre	Brazil	Pepsi on Stage
November 30, 2018	Curitiba	Brazil	Spazio Van
December 15, 2018	Campinas	Brazil	Caos Club
January 24, 2019	São Paulo	Brazil	Audio
February 15, 2019	Porto Velho	Brazil	Talismã 21
February 16, 2019	Manaus	Brazil	Studio 5
February 22, 2019	Rio de Janeiro	Brazil	Hub RJ
February 23, 2019	São Luís	Brazil	Casa das Dunas
March 1, 2019	Brasília	Brazil	Victoria Haus
March 3, 2019	Recife	Brazil	Cais da Alfândega
March 4, 2019	Salvador	Brazil	Circuito Barra Ondina
March 5, 2019	São Paulo	Brazil	Avenida Tiradentes
March 9, 2019	Armação dos Búzios	Brazil	Búzios Beach Resort
North America
April 5, 2019	Mexico City	Mexico	Versalles 64
April 5, 2019	Toluca	Mexico	Foro Pegaso
South America
April 18, 2019	Buenos Aires	Argentina	Palermo Groove
April 19, 2019	Cordoba	Argentina	Studio Theater
April 20, 2019	Santiago	Chile	Bunker
Europe
April 24, 2019	Lisbon	Portugal	Campo Pequeno bullring
April 27, 2019	Aveiro	Portugal	Enterro de Aveiro bullring
April 29, 2019	Dublin	Ireland	The Academy
April 30, 2019	London	England	Heaven
South America
May 11, 2019	Salvador	Brazil	Área Verde do Othon
May 25, 2019	São Caetano do Sul	Brazil	Ginásio Poliesportivo Milton Feijão
North America (NPN Pride Tour)
June 6, 2019	Los Angeles	United States	LA Pride
June 9, 2019	Boston	United States	Boston Pride
June 21, 2019	Miami	United States	Wynwood Pride Music Festival
June 22, 2019	Chicago	United States	Chicago Pride Parade
June 23, 2019	Toronto	Canada	Toronto Pride
June 29, 2019	New York City	United States	Pride Island WorldPride
June 30, 2019	San Francisco	United States	San Francisco Pride
