= Vai Passar Mal: Remixes =

Remix album by Pabllo Vittar
- Released: December 8, 2017
- Recorded: 2016
- Genre: Pop
- Length: 36:54
- Labels: BTM; Sony
- Producers: Omulu; Gran Fran; Enderhax; DJ Zebu; DJ Seakret; DJ Chernobyl; Nando Endres; Junior Fernandes; Ruxell; Atman; TIN

Pabllo Vittar chronology
Vai Passar Mal (2017)	Vai Passar Mal: Remixes (2017)	Up Next Session: Pabllo Vittar (2018)

Vai Passar Mal: Remixes is the first remix album by Brazilian singer and drag queen Pabllo Vittar, containing ten remixes of songs from her debut album, Vai Passar Mal (2017).

== Track listing ==
Vai Passar Mal: Remixes
No.	Title	Writer(s)	Length
1.	"Nêga" (Gran Fran Remix)	Phabullo Silva; Rodrigo Gorky; Maffalda	3:31
2.	"K.O." (Enderhax Remix)	Gorky; Maffalda; Bispo	4:16
3.	"Irregular" (Zebu Remix)	Silva; Gorky; Maffalda; Stefanini	4:28
4.	"Corpo Sensual" (Seakret Remix) (featuring Mateus Carrilho)	Yuri Drummond	3:38
5.	"Tara" (DJ Chernobyl & Nando Endres Remix)	Drummond	3:04
6.	"Então Vai (Get By)" (DKVPZ Remix)	Wesley Pentz; Ilsey; King Henry; Emily; Drummond; Gorky	3:59
7.	"Ele é o Tal" (Junior Fernandes Remix)	Silva; Gorky; Maffalda; Pedro D'Eyrot	2:50
8.	"Pode Apontar" (Ruxell & Atman Remix)	Silva; Drummond; Pablo Bispo; Gorky; Maffalda	3:12
9.	"Indestrutível" (TIN Remix)	Gorky; Maffalda; Bispo	3:50
10.	"Open Bar (Lean On)" (featuring Omulu)	Vittar	3:01
Total length:			36:54
