= A Meia Noite =

"AMEIANOITE"

Single by Pabllo Vittar and Gloria Groove

from the album Noitada
- Language: Portuguese
- Released: October 24, 2022
- Genre: House; funk carioca
- Length: 3:17
- Songwriters: Arthur Marques; Daniel Garcia; Maffalda; Pablo Bispo; Rodrigo Gorky; Ruxell; Tap; Zebu
- Producers: Ruxell; Tapsounds; Brabo Music

Pabllo Vittar singles chronology
"Descontrolada" (2022)	"AMEIANOITE" (2022)	"Sal" (2022)

Gloria Groove singles chronology
"Vermelho" (2022)	"AMEIANOITE" (2022)	"Proibidona" (2023)

Music video
- "AMEIANOITE" on YouTube

"AMEIANOITE" is a song by Brazilian singers and drag queens Pabllo Vittar and Gloria Groove, recorded for Vittar's fifth studio album, Noitada. The song was released for digital download and streaming by Sony Music Brazil, as the album's second single on October 20, 2022.

== Concept ==
The song alludes to the series Wednesday, Chilling Adventures of Sabrina and the music video has a concept inspired by The Blair Witch Project and American Horror Story.

== Promotion and release ==
The promotion of the single began with mysterious publications by Vittar and Groove on social networks announcing their next single, where a mix of mysterious teasers of sects, pentagrams and witches was released. After a few weeks of mystery, the artists announced their return with the single "AMEIANOITE", which would be released on October 20.

"AMEIANOITE" was released for digital download and streaming as the second single from Vittar's album on October 20, 2022.

== Live performances ==
Vittar and Groove performed "" for the first time on Música Boa Ao Vivo on November 8, 2022. On December 3, Vittar performed the song at Caldeirão com Mion. On January 29, 2023, Vittar performed the song on Domingão com Huck. On March 18, Vittar performed the song at Altas Horas.

== Commercial performance ==
The track became the most heard single on the Deezer platform, with large audiences in countries such as Brazil, the United States, Portugal and France. Pabllo Vittar had a growth in the digital platform of 94% in Brazil and 91% in the world in streams and 42% in Brazil and in the world in unique users. Gloria Groove, on the other hand, grew 47% in Brazil and in the world in streams and 25% in Brazil and in the world in unique users, in the same period.

== Release history ==
Release history for "AMEIANOITE"
Region	Date	Format(s)	Label	Ref.
Various	October 20, 2022	Digital download; streaming	Sony	
