= Rasteirinha =

Music genre

- Other names: Funk rasteirinha; Ragga funk; Axé funk
- Stylistic origins: Funk carioca; samba; reggaeton; axé
- Cultural origins: 2012, Rio de Janeiro, Brazil
- Typical instruments: Drum machine, Sampler, Cavaquinho, Pandeiro, Atabaque, Synthesizer

Rasteirinha (Brazilian Portuguese: [ʁasteˈɾĩɲɐ]) or Ragga funk is a subgenre of funk carioca that takes large influence from samba and axé, and adopts Caribbean grooves derived from reggaeton and dancehall. Rasteirinha was born in the early 2010s in the favelas of Rio de Janeiro and quickly popularized by some of its early hits, like MC Delano's "Na Ponta Ela Fica" and MC Romântico's "As Novinha Tão Sensacional". DJs like Mulú, DJ Comrade, Munchi and Buraka Som Sistema later spread it to the world.

== Examples of Rasteirinha songs ==
- MC WM - "Fuleragem"
- Preta Gil, Gloria Groove - "Só o Amor"
- Mulú - "Patrão"
- Pabllo Vittar, Thalía - "Tímida"
- MC Delano - "Na Ponta Ela Fica"
- MC Romântico - "As Novinha Tão Sensacional"
- Kevinho - "Olha a Explosão"
- Anitta - "Sim ou Não"

== See also ==
- Moombahton
- Tecno brega
