= Mercedez Vulcão =

Brazilian drag queen

- Born: Pedro Machitte
- Other name: Mercedes Vulcão
- Occupations: Drag queen; singer; performer
- Years active: 2021–present
- Known for: Contestant on Queen Stars Brasil and Drag Race Brasil (Season 2)

Mercedez Vulcão (also spelled as Mercedes) is the stage name of Pedro Machitte, a Brazilian drag performer who competed on Queen Stars Brasil and the second season of Drag Race Brasil.

== Personal life ==
Mercedez Vulcão is based in São Paulo.
