= Lia Clark =

Brazilian singer and drag queen

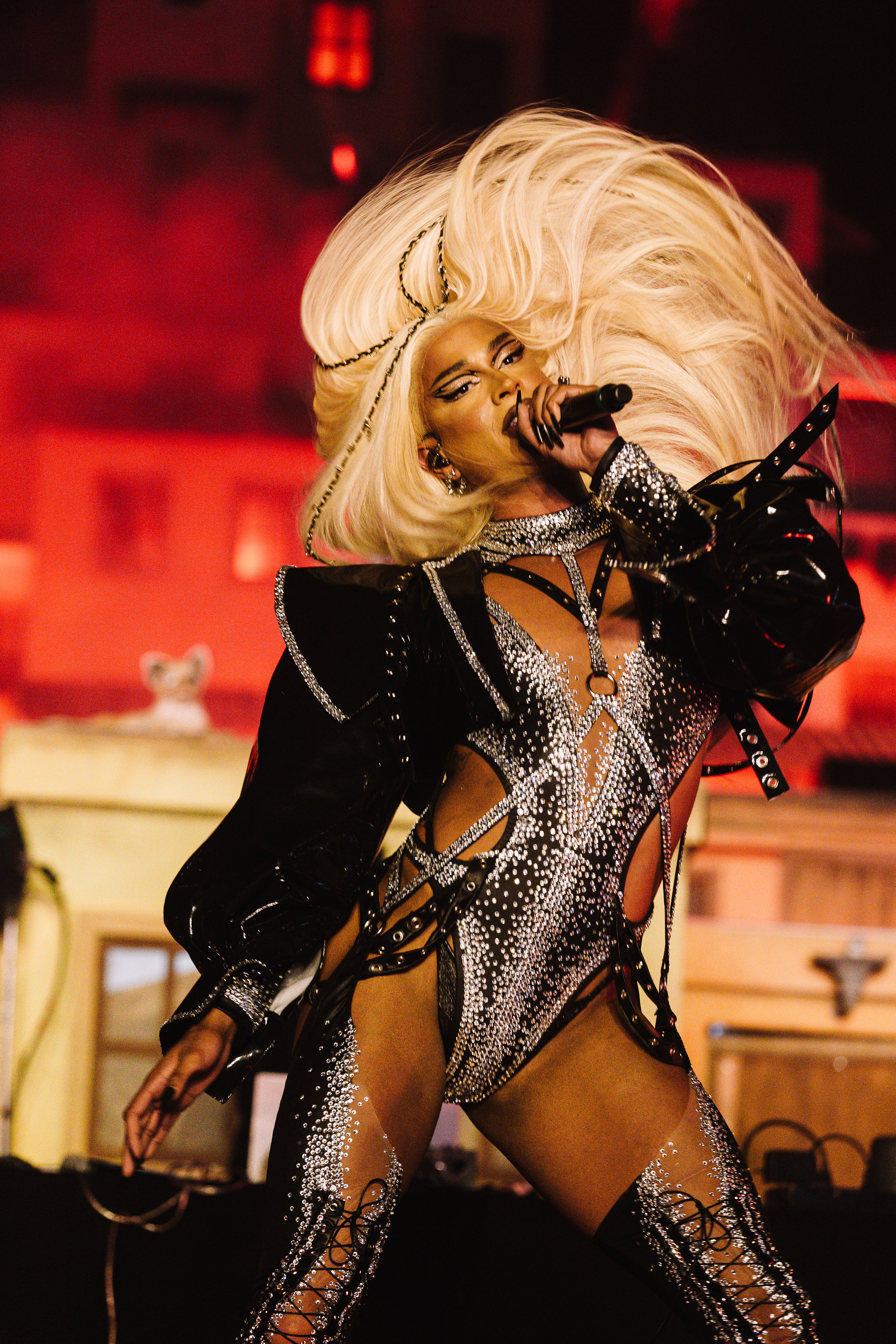
- Lia Clark in 2022

Background information
- Born: Rhael Lima de Oliveira; February 15, 1992 (age 34); Santos, Brazil
- Genres: Brazilian funk, pop
- Occupations: Singer, drag queen
- Years active: 2016–present

Lia Clark, the stage name of Rhael Lima de Oliveira (born February 15, 1992), is a Brazilian singer and drag queen. Born in Santos, São Paulo, Rhael grew up listening to Brazilian funk. Inspired by Valesca Popozuda and Tati Quebra-Barraco, in 2014, Rhael became the drag queen "Lia Clark", working as DJ known to play funk. Two years later, the artist came to prominence as a singer after the release of "Trava Trava". A hit on Spotify and YouTube, it led to a national tour and to the release of the extended play (EP) Clark Boom in 2016. In the following year, the EP spawned hits like "Chifrudo", "TOME CUrtindo" and "Boquetáxi". The first two marked collaborations with trans singer Mulher Pepita and drag queen Pabllo Vittar respectively, while the latter was involved in a controversy when her YouTube video was restricted because of alleged improper sexual content.

During 2018, Clark's singles "Tipo de Garota", "Q.M.T." and "Bumbum no Ar" anticipated the release of the album, É da Pista. The latter song gained notoriety because of the partnership with Wanessa Camargo and its politically motivated music video.

== Biography ==
=== 1992–2015: Early life and musical influences ===
Rhael Lima de Oliveira was born on February 15, 1992, in Santos, São Paulo. Clark was "effeminate kid" who was bullied and felt bad for this. Without positive LGBT role models as a child, "I felt I was somehow wrong and I struggled a lot to understand that I was normal too". The singer grew up in Macuco, a suburban neighborhood where Brazilian funk could be frequently listened, becoming a fan of Valesca Popozuda and Tati Quebra-Barraco. In addition to national singers, the artist was highly influenced by Britney Spears and Nicki Minaj.

In 2014, Clark was studying production engineering and working on a company of importation and exportation but was not satisfied with it. In the same year, Clark started to work as a DJ; already under the alias of "Lia Clark", the artist became known as "the drag who plays funk". After leaving the course in the following year, Clark started to think about recording funk songs.

=== 2016–2017: "Trava Trava" and Clark Boom ===
Clark started a career as a singer in 2016 by releasing the single "Trava Trava" in February. Before its official release, Clark took the song to play on dance clubs of São Paulo. Produced by Pedrowl with a remix of Azealia Banks' "Chasing Time" and a sample of Anitta's "Show das Poderosas", the song became a hit. It reached the second place in Spotify's viral chart and its YouTube video, directed by Gabriel Riccieri, reached 30,000 views on the first day. Because of the song's success, Clark went on a national tour. Despite the success and in spite of criticism on the singer's vocals, Clark declared, "Since the beginning of my career, I always said that I'm not a singer. I'm someone making music for people to have fun". The artist's focus was to create music "for people to have fun and dance in the clubs and at the concerts".

In September 2016, Clark released the single and music video "Clark Boom" (directed by Alexandre Mortágua); with lyrics written by Banda Uó's Mateus Carrilho and a sample of "Rap das Armas", the song announced the release of an extended play (EP). In the same month, the seven-track Clark Boom was released; produced by Pedrowl with lyrics by Clark, Pedrowl and Carrilho, among the songs were "Chifrudo" (featuring Mulher Pepita), "TOME CUrtindo" and "Boquetáxi". In December 2016, Clark released the Christmas-themed single "Ceia (Vem Papá Noel)". Later, the Brazilian counterpart of MTV choose Clark among the ten best new artists of the year.

In January 2017, Clark released the music video for "Chifrudo", and it became one of the hits of that year Carnival. The success of the clip, directed by Riccieri, led to a partnership with Avon that created the Carnival parade "Baile de Boneca". In May, Clark was featured in the music video of Ludmilla's "Cheguei" as a friend of the singer in the Mean Girls-inspired video. Some days later, Clark released a lyric video of a remixed version of "TOME CUrtindo"; sampling Nicki Minaj and Beyoncé's "Feeling Myself", the new version featured Pabllo Vittar and was produced by DJ Brabo. The video, that got 180,00 views in the day of its release, featured 3D scans of the singers along with the lyrics on programming language and, according to director Rodrigo de Oliveira, mixed the aesthetics of The Matrix, Ghost in the Shell and Westworld.

In the following July, the singer released "Boquetáxi" on YouTube; featuring a sample of Angélica's "Vou de Táxi", it became a trending topic on Twitter the day of its release. In the video, directed by Riccieri, Clark uses costumes inspired by Christina Aguilera's "Dirrty". On the following day, however, the video was classified as "restricted" after users' complaints of its sexual nature. Clark deemed it a homophobic action as there is no such restriction for other funk artists with equally sexually explicit lyrics. Later, the video was definitely removed from YouTube; as a new, "2.0" version without the reference to Angélica's song was released in October, media speculated it was a copyrights issue.

=== 2017–present: É da Pista ===
In September 2017, Clark announced to be working on a debut album and that it was already on pre-production. In December of that year, Clark was featured along with Tati Quebra-Barraco in the music video for "Berro", a song by Heavy Baile. In January 2018, Clark released the music video for "Tipo de Garota", which was also the first single for the upcoming album. The video, directed by Rodrigo de Carvalho, featured fans invited to attend the recording in a São Paulo bar and a reference to the restriction of the artist's previous videos. In April, Clark released a new single, "Q.M.T.", which was produced by Heavy Baile and whose music video, released in May, was directed by Os Primos. The piece was inspired by Britney Spears' 2000s videos, especially the one for "Womanizer", and also by Quentin Tarantino's film Kill Bill.

In September, Clark released "Bumbum no Ar", a song featuring pop singer Wanessa Camargo, and whose music video was a political statement against Jair Bolsonaro's presidential campaign. The video features the two singers as hit women who try to kill a presidential candidate with a background of actions against the LGBTQ community, racial minorities and women. Although it was the director Felipe Sassi's idea, Clark embraced it "since I am one of the people who is being silenced in this political process". Moreover, the singer affirmed it was the role of every artist, "especially the ones whose audience is the LGBTQ community and those who come from a working-class background", to use their image to spread "kindness, love and respect".

In November 2018, Clark released the ten-track album É da Pista. To promote the album, "Tu Aguenta", featuring DJ Thai, was released as a single and another music video directed by Riccieri was produced for the song.

== Discography ==
=== Albums and extended plays ===
Title	Album details
Clark Boom	Extended play; Released: September 29, 2016; Label: Independent; Format: EP, digital download; Track listing: 1. "Clark Boom"; 2. "Trava Trava"; 3. "Chifrudo" (featuring Mulher Pepita); 4. "Tome Curtindo"; 5. "Baile de Boneca"; 6. "Boquetáxi"; 7. "Trava Trava (Extended Remix)"
Lia Clark no Estúdio Showlivre (Ao Vivo)	Live album; Released: February 22, 2017; Label: Independent; Format: Digital download; Track listing: 1. "Clark Boom"; 2. "Arregaçada / Eu Duvido / Onda Forte / Ele É o Tal / Tome Curtindo"; 3. "Baile de Boneca"; 4. "É um Perigo / Meu Ex"; 5. "Boquetáxi"; 6. "Chifrudo"; 7. "Trava Trava"
É da Pista	Studio album; Released: November 22, 2018; Label: Independent; Format: CD, digital download; Track listing: 1. "É da Pista"; 2. "Bumbum no Ar" (featuring Wanessa Camargo); 3. "Taca Raba" (featuring PANKADON); 4. "Tu Aguenta" (featuring DJ Thai); 5. "Tchurururu"; 6. "Terremoto" (featuring Gloria Groove); 7. "Embrazô"; 8. "Nude"; 9. "Q.M.T." (featuring Heavy Baile); 10. "Tipo de Garota"

=== Singles and music videos ===
Title	Year	Album	Music video	Video director
Singles (as lead artist)
"Trava Trava"	2016	Clark Boom	Yes	Gabriel Riccieri
"Clark Boom"	2016	Clark Boom	Yes	Alexandre Mortágua
"Ceia (Vem Papá Noel)"	2016	Non-album single	No	—N/a
"Chifrudo" (featuring Mulher Pepita)	2017	Clark Boom	Yes	Gabriel Riccieri
"TOME CUrtindo (Brabo Remix)" (featuring Pabllo Vittar)	2017	Clark Boom	Yes	Rodrigo de Oliveira
"Boquetáxi"	2017	Clark Boom	Yes	Gabriel Riccieri
"Tipo de Garota"	2018	É da Pista	Yes	Rodrigo de Carvalho
"Q.M.T."	2018	É da Pista	Yes	Os Primos (João Monteiro and Fernando Moraes)
"Bumbum no Ar" (featuring Wanessa Camargo)	2018	É da Pista	Yes	Felipe Sassi
"Tu Aguenta" (featuring DJ Thai)	2018	É da Pista	Yes	Gabriel Riccieri
Singles (as featured artist)
"Berro" (Heavy Baile featuring Lia Clark and Tati Quebra-Barraco)	2017	Carne de Pescoço	Yes	Ana Paula Paulino, Cauã Csik and Cherry Rocha
"Lento" (Kika Boom featuring Lia Clark)	2018	Non-album single	Yes	Nathália Mendes
"Boneca Safadinha" (Kaya Conky featuring Lia Clark)	2018	Sabe Que Vai, Pt. 2	No	—N/a
Non-single album tracks (as featured artist)
"Ele é o Tal" (Pabllo Vittar featuring Laura Taylor, Rodrigo Gorky and Lia Clark)	2017	Vai Passar Mal	No	—N/a
