= Academia de Drags season 1 =

Season 1 of Brazilian show "Academia de Drags"

Academia de Drags
- Season 1
- Starring: Silvetty Montilla
- No. of episodes: 7

Release
- Original release: October 13 – December 8, 2014

The first season of Academia de Drags debuted on YouTube at 8 p.m. every Monday between October 13, 2014 and December 8, 2014. The judges include famous Brazilian drag queen Silvetty Montilla, designer Alexandre Herchcovitch and the makeup artist Elisha Cabral.

The season had seven episodes and featured eight participants who showed their dance skills, characterization, talent, humor and drag personality. Gysella Popovick was the winner of the season and was awarded with an international trip for two, a real wig from Lully Hair and a show produced by a club in São Paulo, and also being declared Brazil's most complete drag queen. Yasmin Carraroh was the runner-up, and Rita Von Hunty was elected by the public the "Miss Arrasa Bixa," a Brazilian variation of Miss Congeniality.

The public reception was very positive, so in late 2014 the show was renewed for a second season.

== Classes ==
Episode	Debut date	Class	Professor
1	October 13, 2014	Fashion and Runway	Alexandre Herchcovitch
2	October 20, 2014	Makeup and Characterization	Eliseu Cabral
3	October 27, 2014	Humor	Grace Gianoukas
4	November 3, 2014	Interpretation	Titi Muller and Luis Vaz
5	November 10, 2014	Dance	Jairo Azevedo and Alexia Twyster
6	November 17, 2014	none	
7	December 8, 2014	none	

== Contestants ==
(Ages at the time of contest)

Contestant	Real name	Age	Hometown	Episode						
Contestant	Real name	Age	Hometown	1	2	3	4	5	6	7
Gysella Popovick	Genival Alexandre	23	Recife - PE	APV	WIN	APV	APV	APV	APV	WINNER
Yasmin Carraroh	Paulo Sergio Viana	23	Dourados – MS	APV	APV	WIN	WIN	BTM2	APV	RUNNER-UP
Lavynia Storm	Ramon de Mattos	25	Cascavel - PR	APV	APV	APV	BTM2	APV	FAILED	
Xantara Thompson	Breno Tavares	25	Brasília – DF	WIN	APV	APV	APV	WIN	FAILED	
Rita Von Hunty	Guilherme Terreri	22	São Paulo - SP	BTM2	APV	APV	APV	FAILED		Miss Arrasa Bixa
Musa	Flávio Ramos	23	São Paulo - SP	APV	BTM2	BTM2	FAILED			
Laurie Blue	Natan	22	Brasília – DF	BTM2	APV	FAILED				
Hidra Von Carter	Artur Viana	23	São Paulo - SP	APV	FAILED					

The participant was the winner of Academia de Drags.
The participant was the runner-up.
The participant placed third.
The participant was considered the best in the final test and was the winner of the week.
The participant was not the winner of the final test, but was on the winning team.
The participant had to retake the test (was in the bottom two), but neither one was eliminated.
The participant had to retake the test (was in the bottom two), but was not eliminated.
The participant was one of the worst, had to retake the test (was in the bottom two), and failed the final test (was eliminated).
The participant was voted Miss Arrasa Bixa (Miss Congeniality) by the audience.
The participant was approved and advanced to the final, but had to lipsync.

=== Notes ===
- Episode 04 - Yasmin Carraroh became the first participant in the show's history to win two consecutive challenges.
- Episode 04 - Musa became the first and only participant in the show's history to retake the test three times.
- Episode 07 - Gysella Popovick became the first participant in the show's history to reach the final without having to retake the test.

== Lipsync Battles ==
Episode	Contestants			Song	Eliminated
1	Rita Von Hunty	vs.	Laurie Blue	Brand New Day (Lorena Simpson)	None
2	Musa	vs.	Hidra Von Carter	Brand New Day (Lorena Simpson)	Hidra Von Carter
3	Musa	vs.	Laurie Blue	Acabou (Nicky Valentine)	Laurie Blue
4	Musa	vs.	Lavynia Storm	Cha Cha Boom (Breno Barrteo com Nicky Valentine)	Musa
5	Yasmin Carraroh	vs.	Rita Von Hunty	Kiss Kiss Goodbye (Nicky Valentine com Tommy Love); Can't Stop Loving You (Lorena Simpson)	Rita Von Hunty
6	All the remaining contestants: Gysella Popovick vs. Xantara Thompson; Yasmin Carraroh vs. Lavynia Storm			My Samba (Nicky Valentine com Breno Barrteo); Pisces (Tommy Love com Natalia Damini)	Xantara Thompson; Lavynia Storm

The contestant was eliminated after their first time in the bottom two.
The contestant was eliminated after their second time in the bottom two.
The contestant was eliminated after their third time in the bottom two.
The contestant was eliminated after the final lipsync of the season.
