= Pepita (artist) =

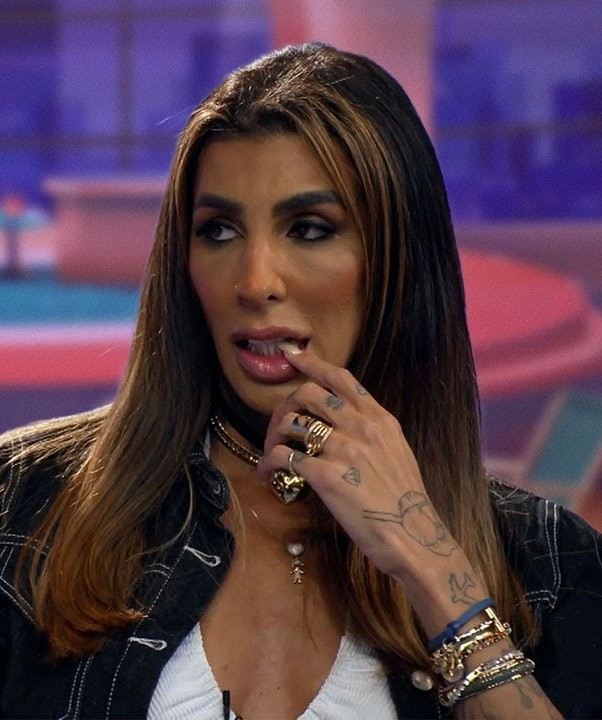
- Pepita during a comedy sketch on the Multishow channel (2023)

Background information
- Born: Priscila Nogueira; January 25, 1983 (age 43); Rio de Janeiro, Brazil
- Genre: Funk carioca
- Occupations: Singer, songwriter, dancer
- Years active: 2014–present
- Labels: Universal Music Group; ONErpm; Altafonte; Tratore

Priscila Nogueira (born in Rio de Janeiro on January 25, 1983), better known as Pepita or Mulher Pepita, is a Brazilian singer, songwriter, actress, and dancer. She is notable for being one of the first transgender funk carioca singers in Brazil and for her LGBTQ activism.

== Biography ==
Pepita began her career as a funk dancer. While performing in nightclubs in Rio de Janeiro, the singer was given the song Tô à Procura de um Homem by a friend, and immediately launched her musical career. Her first show was in the city of São Paulo.

In 2014, a video of the artist dancing leaked online. With the video going viral, Pepita quickly gained significant visibility, becoming a meme in the Brazilian gay community. This success and fame culminated in the release of the artist's first EP, titled "Grandona pra Caralho" (one of the artist's catchphrases, which means "Huge as Fuck" in Portuguese, referring to derogatory comments made about her body).

In 2017, Pepita released the song "Chifrudo," in partnership with drag queen Lia Clark. In January, she also released "Uma Vez Piranha."

In January 2019, she starred in the music video for "Retrogado" by the Brazilian duo Phillipi & Rodrigo.

Based on the popularity she gained on social media, she created the segment "Cartas pra Pepita," (lit. 'Letters to Pepita') dedicated to reading stories sent in by fans and discussing everyday topics. The project later spawned a book, a play, and an interview program.

In 2022, Pepita legally adopted Lucca Antonio, the biological son from a previous relationship of her husband, Kayque Nogueira, and began publicly advocating for trans motherhood and the recognition of different family configurations.

In 2026, she became the first transgender person to get married on the SBT program Fábrica de Casamentos (lit. 'Wedding Factory'). Alongside Kayque, with whom she had already formalized their union during the pandemic, she participated in a new ceremony shown on the program, in which the couple reminisced about their relationship history and highlighted the representativeness of the celebration.
