= Vermelho (song) =

Single by Gloria Groove

from the album Lady Leste
- Language: Portuguese
- Released: February 10, 2022
- Recorded: SB Music
- Genre: pop; funk carioca
- Length: 2:32
- Songwriters: Daniel Garcia; Daniel Pellegrine; Pablo Bispo; Ruxell
- Producers: Pablo Bispo; Ruxell

Gloria Groove singles chronology
"Onda Poderosa" (2022)	"Vermelho" (2022)	"A Meia Noite" (2022)

Music video
- "Vermelho" on YouTube

"Vermelho" (Portuguese: [veʁˈmeʎu], transl. "Red") is a song by Brazilian singer and drag queen Gloria Groove, recorded for her second studio album Lady Leste. The song was released for digital download and streaming through SB Music, as the fourth single from Lady Leste on February 10, 2022, the same release date as Groove's album.

== Promotion ==
The promotion of the single began with publications on the Hugo Gloss website on social networks announcing the next single by Lady Leste entitled "Vermelho".

== Lyrics and composition ==
In early February, Groove officially announced the release of a single with references and samples from the song "Quem é?" by MC Daleste. "Vermelho" was released for digital download and streaming as the album's fourth single on February 10, 2022.

== Music video ==
Directed by Belle de Melo, the music video was recorded in the early hours of January 2022 in the Jardim Ibirapuera community, in São Paulo. The music video premiered the day after the release of Lady Leste. According to Groove, "Vermelho" is one of the funkiest songs on the album and is a tribute to MC Daleste, using a sample of "Quem é?", a great hit by the MC.

== Live performances ==
Groove performed "Vermelho" for the first time on Domingão com Huck on February 13, 2022. On February 25, Groove performed the song at Encontro com Fátima Bernardes. On March 3, Groove performed the song on Faustão na Band. On March 4, Groove performed the song on the twenty-second season of Big Brother Brasil. On May 21, Groove performed the song at Altas Horas.

On May 29, Groove performed the song on Programa Eliana. On July 16, Groove performed the song at Caldeirão com Mion. On October 18, Groove performed the song at the Prêmio Multishow de Música Brasileira 2022.

== Charts ==
Chart (2022)	Peak position
Brasil (Billboard Brazil Songs)	10
Portugal (AFP)	38

=== Year-end charts ===
2022 year-end chart performance for "Vermelho"
Chart (2022)	Position
Brazil (Pro-Música Brasil)	43

== Certifications ==
Certifications for Vermelho
Region	Certification	Certified units/sales
Brazil (Pro-Música Brasil)	Diamond	300,000^{‡}
Portugal (AFP)	Gold	5,000^{‡}
^{‡} Sales+streaming figures based on certification alone.

== Release history ==
Release history for "Vermelho"
Region	Date	Format(s)	Label	Ref.
Various	February 10, 2022	Digital download; streaming	SB Music	
