= Lady Leste =

Studio album by Gloria Groove
- Released: February 10, 2022
- Recorded: 2020–2021
- Genres: Pop; R&B; hip-hop; funk carioca
- Length: 39:05
- Language: Portuguese
- Labels: SB Music; Sony Music Brazil
- Producers: Pablo Bispo; Ruxell; Lukinhas

Gloria Groove chronology
Affair (2020)	Lady Leste (2022)	Lady Leste; Ao Vivo (2023)

Singles from Lady Leste
- 1. "Bonekinha" Released: June 17, 2021; 2. "A Queda" Released: October 14, 2021; 3. "Leilão" Released: November 25, 2021; 4. "Vermelho" Released: February 10, 2022

Lady Leste (Portuguese: [lejˈdʒi ˈlɛstʃi]; Lady East) is the second studio album by Brazilian singer and drag queen Gloria Groove, released on February 10, 2022, through SB Music and Sony Music Brazil. The album contains collaborations with Sorriso Maroto, Marina Sena, Tasha & Tracie, MC Hariel, MC Tchelinho and Priscilla Alcantara, with production including Pablo Bispo and Ruxell. It is primarily a hip-hop, trap and funk carioca album with R&B and pop elements.

== Concept ==
Gloria Groove released the cover art on February 9, 2022, a day before the album's release.

Groove lands on top of a luxury car at a gas station. The license plate of the car is "GG2022", referring to the initials of the interpreter and the year of release of the album and in the sign of the gas station the name Lady Leste. The photo shoot took place at a gas station near Marginal Tietê Avenue in São Paulo.

== Critical reception ==
In general terms, Lady Leste was acclaimed by specialized critics. Pedro Paulo Furlan, from Nação da Música, rated it 4.5 out of 5 stars and said that "Gloria Groove's second studio album is a manifesto to the artist's versatility. Featuring the most complex productions of her career, in addition to An immense number of musical genres explored, and an unbeatable polish in the singer and rapper's verses, Lady Leste introduces us to a Groove that cannot be limited and that is continually evolving".

Allan César and Anna Sabatini from the Tracklist portal rated it 8.5 out of 10 and wrote that “the album is very popular Brazilian music in its most varied aspects, a representation that its essence is not one, but diverse”. Luana Harumi, from the RocknBold website, rated it 4 out of 5 stars and said that "Lady Leste is Gloria Groove's pop triumph (...) Lady Leste is an irresistible and potent work that enshrines Gloria Groove as one of the greatest names of Brazilian pop".

== Commercial performance ==
The album was a commercial success reaching #1 on Spotify's Top Albums Debut Global, being the best debut since Doce 22 (2021), by singer Luísa Sonza on the platform. All tracks also reached the Top 40 on Deezer.

== Release and promotion ==
=== Singles ===
"Bonekinha" was released as the album's lead single on June 17, 2021.

"A Queda" was released as the album's second single on October 14, 2021, and received diamond certification in Brazil by Pro-Música Brasil and gold in Portugal by Associação Fonográfica Portuguesa.

"Leilão" was released as the album's third single on November 25, 2021; received gold certification in Portugal and received diamond certification in Brazil.

"Vermelho" was released as the album's fourth single on February 10, 2022; received gold certification in Portugal and received diamond certification in Brazil.

On December 30, 2022, the song, "Sobrevivi", featuring Priscilla Alcantara, won an official music video, with performance, studio and backstage footage of the song.

== Track listing ==
Lady Leste track listing
No.	Title	Writer(s)	Producer(s)	Length
1.	"SFM" (with MC Hariel)	Daniel Garcia; Hariel; Pablo Bispo; Ruxell	Bispo; Ruxell	2:29
2.	"Bonekinha"	Garcia; Bispo; Ruxell	Bispo; Ruxell	2:48
3.	"Vermelho"	Garcia; Daniel Pellegrine; Bispo; Ruxell	Bispo; Ruxell	2:32
4.	"Fogo no Barraco" (with MC Tchelinho)	Blue; Garcia; Tchelinho; Bispo; Ruxell	Bispo; Ruxell	2:25
5.	"Tua Indecisão" (with Sorriso Maroto)	Castilhol; Garcia; Lukinhas; Bispo; Ruxell	Bispo; Ruxell	3:50
6.	"Apenas um Neném" (with Marina Sena)	Garcia; Lukinhas; Bispo; Ruxell	Bispo; Ruxell	3:10
7.	"Jogo Perigoso"	Garcia; Bispo; Ruxell; Sergio Santos	Bispo; Ruxell	2:45
8.	"Greta"	Garcia; Bispo; Ruxell	Bispo; Ruxell	2:32
9.	"Pisando Fofo" (with Tasha & Tracie)	Garcia; Lukinhas; Tasha; Tracie; Bispo; Ruxell	Bispo; Ruxell; Lukinhas	4:14
10.	"Leilão"	Garcia; Bispo; Ruxell	Bispo; Ruxell	3:08
11.	"LSD"	Garcia; Bispo; Ruxell	Bispo; Ruxell	2:56
12.	"A Queda"	Garcia; Lukinhas; Bispo; Ruxell	Bispo; Ruxell	2:53
13.	"Sobrevivi" (with Priscilla Alcantara)	Garcia; Gondim; Bispo; Alcântara; Ruxell	Bispo; Ruxell	3:18
Total length:				39:05

== Certifications ==
Certifications for Lady Leste
Region	Certification	Certified units/sales
Brazil (Pro-Música Brasil)	3× Platinum	240,000^{‡}
^{‡} Sales+streaming figures based on certification alone.

== Release history ==
Release dates and formats for Lady Leste
Region	Date	Format	Label	Ref.
Various	February 10, 2023	digital download; streaming	Sony Music Brazil	
