= Lorena Simpson =

Brazilian singer-songwriter and dancer

- Born: Lorena Braga Gomes Simpson; 30 March 1987 (age 39); Manaus, Amazonas, Brazil
- Genres: Pop music, EDM, electropop
- Occupations: Singer, Songwriter, Dancer and Host
- Years active: 2008–present
- Labels: Maxpop Music (2008—2010); Wegroup (2011—2018)
- Website: lorenasimpson.com.br

Lorena Braga Gomes Simpson (born 30 March 1987) is a Brazilian singer, dancer, and songwriter . She is the biggest and most awarded Brazilian artist in the electronic music scene. She became well known for hits such as "Brand New Day" and "Can't Stop Loving You”.

She has performed in music festivals and events in Brazil, Latin America, Europe and the United States, moving a whole generation to dance floors around the world. Lorena is considered a pioneer. She is responsible for changing the market of shows in Brazil, while also creating a great impact inside the LGBTQIA+ community. She has become an inspiration for other Brazilian artists from different genres, who now follow her shows and performance model.

After 10 years of building an established name in the electronic music scene, several awards and hundreds of shows around the globe, she started working on her new sound "Amazonian Pop" which is a mix of pop music and sounds and rhythms influenced by her native culture from her hometown the city of Manaus located in the middle of the Amazon rainforest.

Lorena has been developing her "Amazonian Pop" sound since 2018 and in 2020, she released her single in Portuguese “Chama Que Vem” written by Vitao, which was well received by critics and fans. The music video was shot in the middle of the Amazon rainforest, where she was born and raised, creating a perfect scenario for the song and her music. After her first Pop Amazônico release was born, the term "Pop Amazônico" has been used by other artists from the north, almost creating a new lane and genre of pop music in Brazil.

Currently, she has been working on developing her new music, while also creating new opportunities and collaborating with other artists.

Over the years, Lorena has collaborated with many music producers and Djs, resulting in over 20 featured songs and over 35 million streams and views on digital platforms such as Spotify, YouTube and Deezer.

== Early life ==
Lorena Simpson was born in the city of Manaus, the capital of the state of Amazonas. She is a descendant of Portuguese on her mother's side and Irish on her father's side[1]. Since she was young she always dreamed of being an artist, even though she had difficulties imposed by the demographic location, she never gave up on her dreams and kept fighting for her goals. At the age of 17, Lorena left her hometown for the big cities in search of improvement in the art of dance, and after years working professionally as a dancer in television programs, commercials and other projects, she started her solo career as a singer.

== Career ==
At the age of 17, Lorena started her career as a professional dancer. She performed on several television productions, commercials, movies and also tours with other artists including the Brazilian singer Kelly Key. Lorena was handpicked by the renowned talent manager Marlene Mattos for Kelly’s tour.

In 2008, with years of experience in the entertainment industry as a dancer, she started her singing career with the release of her first single "Feel da Funk" produced by Mr. Jam. In the same year, in collaboration with DJ and producer Filipe Guerra, she released the songs "Can't Stop Loving You" and "Brand New Day”. Those hits were responsible for establishing her in the Brazilian electronic music scene and making Lorena Simpson's name a national brand.

In 2010, Lorena’s music was playing in countries around the world. Her tours went all over Brazil and 7 other countries, including Panama, Chile, the United States, and Europe. She was among the five most played artists in Mexico that year, while also being nominated as "Ambassador of Gender Equality" in the country. In 2013, she released her first EP " Lorena Simpson" consisting of four tracks. The song "This Moment" was the first release produced by Yinon Yahel, known for working with great artists like Offer Nissim, Jennifer Lopez and Madonna.

Due to the success of her shows, the artist began to receive invitations to collaborate with other artists on the rise at the time, such as Anitta, Pabllo Vittar, Lexa and Ludmilla.

In 2014, she recreated Britney Spears' 2003 MTV Video Music Awards performance of the song "I'm a Slave 4 U" together with singer Anitta during the Chá da Alice event in Rio de Janeiro causing a lot attention from the press.

Completing 10 years of career in the electronic scene, several awards and more than 600 shows around the world, Lorena decided to make changes including adding songs in Portuguese to her repertoire. Her first single in Portuguese was " Eu Quero Mais" in 2018.

In 2020, Lorena released the song "Chama Que Vem", written by Vitão, which has influences of sounds and rhythms of the Amazonian indigenous and folk culture. The music video was shot in her hometown of Manaus, which is located in the center of the Amazon rainforest. Also in 2020, Lorena was invited to be featured on Pablo Vittar's new album "Deluxe111”, with the official remix of the song "Flash Pose”. The song being one of the most heard tracks on the album.

Lorena Simpson is a supporter of LGBTQ+ causes and for more visibility of the art and culture of state of Amazonas.

== Singles ==
Year	Song
2008	"Feel da Funk"
2008	"Can't Stop Loving You"
2009	"Brand New Day"
2009	"Revolution of Love"
2010	"Breathe Again"
2011	"Dreams"
2012	"Jump Up"
2014	"This Moment" (feat. Yinon Yahel)
2014	"To The Ground" "This Moment" Released: 2014 "Sirens" Released: 2016

"Eu Quero Mais"

Released: 2018

"Bem Melhor"

Released: 2018

Kayky, Lorena Simpson

Album: "Nós dois" Released: 2019

"Bate Leque"

Released: 2019

"Vantagem"

Released: 2020

"Easy" Released: 2020

"Make Me Go"

Released: 2020

"Chama Que Vem"

Released: 2020

=== As featured artist ===
Year	Song
2010	"Money" (Angel B feat. Lorena Simpson)
2012	"Summer is Crazy" (Amannda feat. Lorena Simpson)

== Tours ==
- 2008–2009: Breathe Again
- 2010–2011: Dreams Tour
- 2012-2013: Neo Time Tour
- 2014–2015: To The Ground Tour
- 2015–2016: House Of Pop
- hey hey tour
- @tour
- LS Lovers Tour

== Music videos ==
Year	Song
2009	"Brand New Day"
2010	"Dreams"
2011	"Money" (feat. Angel B)
2011	"Summer is Crazy" (feat. Amannda)
2014	"This Moment" (feat. Yinon Yahel)
2014	"To The Ground"

== Awards ==
=== Top Music Brasil ===
2009

- Best National Dance Music
- New Artist

=== Ômega HitZ Awards ===
2010

- National Dance Performance
- Dance Music of the Year (for "Breathe Again")
- Dance Show of the Year

=== DJSound Award ===
2011

- Best Show Dancing

2012

- National Dance Single Female (for "Jump Up")

Sexual Diversity Ambassador in México City

2010

=== PapoMix Diversidade ===
2011

- Best Female Singer

=== Jovem Brasileiro ===
2012

- Best Singer Electronic Music
