= Proibidona =

Single by Gloria Groove with Anitta and Valesca Popozuda

from the EP Futuro Fluxo
- Language: Portuguese
- Released: January 18, 2023
- Genre: Proibidão; pop; funk ostentação
- Length: 2:37
- Label: SB Music
- Songwriters: Daniel Garcia; Multi; Pablo Bispo; Ruxell; TAP
- Producers: Tapsounds; Pablo Bispo; Ruxell

Gloria Groove singles chronology
"A Meia Noite" (2022)	"Proibidona" (2023)	"Furduncin" (2023)

Anitta singles chronology
"Simply the Best" (2022)	"Proibidona" (2023)	"Mais Uma" (2023)

Valesca Popozuda singles chronology
"Popo Girando" (2023)	"Proibidona" (2023)	"Encapa o Boneco" (2023)

Music video
- "Proibidona" on YouTube

"Proibidona" (Portuguese: [pɾojbiˈdonɐ]) is a song by Brazilian singer and drag queen Gloria Groove. It features the singers Anitta and Valesca Popozuda. The song was released for digital download and streaming by SB Music on January 18, 2023.

== Background and release ==
Promotion of the single began with publications by Groove on social networks announcing the next single titled "Proibidona". The song was chosen to be the lead single for the Futuro Fluxo project, which aims to inaugurate a new era in Groove's career. In a statement, the artist highlighted the importance of celebrating the role of women in the history of the musical genre. "Proibidona" was released for digital download and streaming on January 18, 2023.

"Proibidona is my first single of 2023, a song in partnership with Anitta and Valesca Popozuda, mainly celebrating the history of these women in funk and the aesthetics they helped to originate. Nothing is more beautiful and encouraging to start an era in funk than having the blessing of these two women who, each in their own way, left an eternal mark on the history of what we know as Brazilian funk. Funk is not judgement, funk is love and freedom."

— Gloria Groove, in an interview with Estadão.

== Music video ==
Directed by Eder Samuel, the music video was recorded at Universo Spanta, in Rio de Janeiro. The music video was recorded during Ensaios da Anitta.

== Certifications ==
Certifications for "Proibidona"
Region	Certification	Certified units/sales
Brazil (Pro-Música Brasil)	2× Platinum	160,000^{‡}
^{‡} Sales+streaming figures based on certification alone.

== Release history ==
Release dates and formats for Proibidona
Region	Date	Format	Label	Ref.
Various	January 18, 2023	digital download; streaming	SB Music	
