= Tímida =

Single by Pabllo Vittar and Thalía

from the album 111
- English title: "Shy"
- Released: March 19, 2020
- Genre: Latin pop; Rasteirinha
- Length: 2:37
- Label: Sony
- Songwriters: Rodrigo Gorky; Danielle Sanchez; Pablo Bispo; Zebu; Gale; Arthur Marques; Maffalda
- Producer: Brabo Music Team

Pabllo Vittar singles chronology
"Clima Quente" (2020)	"Tímida" (2020)	"Rajadão" (2020)

Thalía singles chronology
"Lo Siento Mucho" (2020)	"Tímida" (2020)	"Mi No Cumpleaños" (2020)

"Tímida" (English: "Shy") is a song by Brazilian singer and drag queen Pabllo Vittar with Mexican singer and actress Thalía, contained in Vittar's third studio album, 111 (2020). The track was released as the album's second single on March 19, 2020, through Sony Music Brazil.

The song entered charts in Chile and the U.S. and also had some airplay in Russia. The song was certified gold in Brazil for selling 40,000 copies, becoming Thalía's second certification there after her album En éxtasis and her first single certification there.

== Commercial performance ==
The song managed to enter the charts in Chile reaching the top ten in both the general and pop charts. The song was certified gold in Vittar's native Brazil on April 3, 2021, and reached a platinum certification by July 29, 2021, making it the first single certification for Thalia in that country and second overall. The song also entered the Latin pop digital charts in the U.S. and received airplay in Russia. It was the 22nd most played song on pop radio in Chile in 2020.

== Music video ==
The video for the single was released one day after the song. The video shows Pabllo and Thalía dancing sensually on beds with their legs open.

== Charts ==
=== Weekly charts ===
Chart (2020)	Peak position
Chile (Monitor Latino)	9
US Latin Pop Digital Song Sales (Billboard)	13

=== Year-end charts ===
Chart (2020)	Position
Chile (Monitor Latino)	62

== Certifications ==
Region	Certification	Certified units/sales
Brazil (Pro-Música Brasil)	Platinum	80,000^{‡}
^{‡} Sales+streaming figures based on certification alone.
