= Super Drags =

Adult animated comedy web television series

- Genre: Adult animation; Comedy; Superhero; Action
- Created by: Anderson Mahanski; Paulo Lescaut; Fernando Mendonça
- Written by: Paulo Lescaut; Marcelo Souza; Fernanda Brandalise; Chico Amorim; Vânia Matos
- Directed by: Fernando Mendonça
- Voices of: Pabllo Vittar; Sylvia Salustti; Silvetty Montilla; Suzy Brasil; Guilherme Briggs; Rapha Vélez; Fernando Mendonça; Wagner Follare; Sérgio Cantú
- Opening theme: "Highlight" by Pabllo Vittar
- Country of origin: Brazil
- Original languages: Portuguese; English
- No. of seasons: 1
- No. of episodes: 5

Production
- Executive producer: Marcelo Pereira
- Producer: Marcelo Pereira
- Running time: 23–25 minutes
- Production company: Combo Estúdio

Original release
- Network: Netflix
- Release: 9 November 2018

Super Drags is a Brazilian adult animated comedy television series created by Anderson Mahanski, Fernando Mendonça and Paulo Lescaut for Netflix.

Produced by Combo Estúdio, the series follows the adventures of Donizete, Patrick, and Ralph, three friends working in a department store who are also drag queen superheroes: Scarlet Carmesim, Lemon Chiffon, and Safira Cyan, the Super Drags responsible for protecting the LGBT community. and they need to combat with the homophobic villain Lady Elza.

The series has an English dub featuring the voices of RuPaul's Drag Race contestants Trixie Mattel, Ginger Minj, Willam, and Shangela.

== Cancellation ==
Five episodes were released on November 9, 2018. The following month, Netflix cancelled the series after one season.

== Cast and characters ==
Cast and characters of Super Drags
Character	Original voice	English dub voice
Donizete / Scarlet Carmesim	Fernando Mendonça	Shangela
Patrick / Lemon Chiffon	Sérgio Cantú	Ginger Minj
Ralph / Safira Cyan	Wagner Follare	Rod Keller
Goldiva	Pabllo Vittar	Jeff Manabat
Vedete Champagne	Silvetty Montilla	Trixie Mattel
Lady Elza	Rapha Vélez	Willam Belli
Jezebel	Sylvia Salustti	Anna Stromberg
Sandoval	Fernando Mendonça	Marz Richards
Val Valadão	Patrícia Garcia	Jaquita Ta'le
Robertinho / Janjão	Guilherme Briggs	Henry Dittman

== Episodes ==
=== Season 1 (2018) ===
No.	Title	Directed by	Written by	Original release date
1	"Lipsync Time"	Fernando Mendonça	Vânia Matos	November 9, 2018
To restore her beauty, Lady Elza steals all the "highlight" energy from LGBTQ concertgoers at a Goldiva show, spurring the Super Drags to save the day.
2	"Image Is Everything"	Fernando Mendonça	Chico Amorim	November 9, 2018
Disqualified from a mission to stop Lady Elza's new robot monster, which seems to target victims based on their looks, Patrick gives himself a makeover.
3	"The Gay Cure"	Fernando Mendonça	Fernanda Brandalise	November 9, 2018
Rejected by his father after coming out to him, Ralph attends Sandoval's "gay cure" boot camp, where Donizete and Patrick are sent to work undercover.
4	"Be Who You Are"	Fernando Mendonça	Marcelo Souza	November 9, 2018
When Goldiva is kidnapped ahead of her next concert and the Super Drags are summoned to save her, Scarlet learns about the pop diva's past.
5	"A Single Voice"	Fernando Mendonça	Paulo Lescaut	November 9, 2018
At Goldiva's concert, Lady Elza takes the stage and amps herself up by draining the audience's highlight, putting the Super Drags in serious danger.

== Production ==
=== LGBTQ representation ===
A year after Castlevania began streaming, Super Drags was added to Netflix. The show focuses on Donizete, Patrick, and Ralph, three gay friends working in a department store, who are also drag queen superheroes, named Scarlet Carmesim, Lemon Chiffon, and Safira Cyan are the Super Drags, and are responsible for protecting the LGBTQ community. On December 30, 2020, Donnie Lopez published an article on Black Girl Nerds, lamenting the lack of an "animated gay Latino male superhero being the lead of his own show," saying that while there has been an increase in the number of "LGBT+ folks being presented on family animated superhero shows," this has mainly focused on lesbian and bisexual characters, without "gay male Latino/Hispanic superhero animated leads." Lopez added that maintaining, popularizing, and creating gay characters can start to assuage harmful attitudes, noting that shows seldom "give gay male POC characters the title roles" in children's animation, leading them to perpetrate the idea that "gay male characters cannot be standalone titular characters." Even so, he gives the example of Aqualad in Season Three of Young Justice who is a bisexual Black man, while qualifying this by saying that Aqualad is "not the principal character of the show" and noting that while Super Drags did make gay men the protagonists, it "reinforced negative stereotypes" and hoped that the "lack of gay representation" in these animations could be remedied in the future.

=== Marketing and release ===
The first trailer was released on October 19, 2018. A Halloween special short video entitled "Gag! Gross, but I love it" ("Credo Que Delícia", in the original version) was released on October 31, 2018, on the series' official Facebook page. The music video "Highlight", performed by Pabllo Vittar, which features main characters of the series, was released on November 7, 2018. The first season, consisting of five episodes, was officially released on November 9, 2018.

== Reception ==
Decider gave the show a positive review while noting that "We can’t deny we were hoping the humor here would be sharper." Charles Puilliam-Moore of Io9 praised the show for its political commentary and condemnation of homophobia, while criticizing some of the raunchier aspects of its humor as a weak part of the show. S.E. Fleenor wrote a positive review for SyFy Wire, calling it "an outrageous, adults-only, gay romp filled with sardonic condemnations of the rampant erasure and destruction of queer people told through harrowing exploits, hypersexual superpowers, and hilariously floppy cartoon bulges."

=== Controversy ===
Before its release, the series was the subject of controversy. In July 2018, the Brazilian Society of Pediatrics issued an official statement, claiming that the series could be harmful for children. However, Netflix has stated that the series is only meant for adult audiences, subsequently releasing a red-band trailer with a TV-MA rating displayed throughout. Also, another video was released, where Champagne, one of the series' characters, warns viewers that even though the series is animated, it contains adult content and is only for people over the age of 16.
