= Todo Dia =

Single by Pabllo Vittar and Rico Dalasam

Single by Pabllo Vittar featuring Rico Dalasam

from the album Vai Passar Mal
- Released: January 12, 2017
- Genre: Funk carioca; hip hop
- Length: 2:25
- Label: BMT Produções
- Songwriters: DJ Gorky; Arthur Gomes; Jefferson Silva
- Producers: Gorky; Gomes

Pabllo Vittar singles chronology
"Nêga" (2016)	"Todo Dia" (2017)	"K.O." (2017)

Rico Dalassam singles chronology
"Procure" (2017)	"Todo Dia" (2017)	"Sinfonia da Revolução" (2017)

"Todo Dia" (English: "Every Day") is a song by Brazilian singer and drag queen Pabllo Vittar from her debut studio album Vai Passar Mal (2017). The funk carioca song features Rico Dalasam and was released as the second single from the album on Vittar's YouTube channel and other streaming services on January 12, 2017.

Two months after its release, the music video reached 10 million views on YouTube, becoming the most watched video by a drag queen, surpassing RuPaul's "Sissy That Walk". It was then surpassed by Vittar's following single, "K.O."

== Background ==
Initially, Rico Dalasam composed the chorus and showed it to the producers DJ Gorky and Arthur Gomes - also known as Maffalda -, who were responsible for finishing it. Recorded in Uberlândia, Minas Gerais, the song's chorus says as it follows: "I don't wait for the Carnival to be a slut, I am every day". According to Vittar, "[Being a slut] means 'to be yourself everyday without worrying about opinions of others.'"

== Controversy ==
On August 1, 2017, the music video of the song was removed from YouTube after Rico Dalasam filed a lawsuit against the producers, claiming 100% of the music royalties. On August 9, the song was removed from all digital platforms, including Spotify.

== Reception ==
The public's reception was very positive, in the week it was released, Todo Dia peaked at number 3 on Spotify's Viral 50 Global. The song soon rose to success, being one of the most played of Brazilian 2017 Carnival. Vittar performed the song with Anitta and Daniela Mercury in carnival blocks.

== Music video ==
The music video was released on January 20, 2017, being produced by the Studio Farândola, and with general direction by Guilherme Batista and Fabrício Sassioto, who were also responsible for post production. The video features a simple theme with a very tropical and artistic aesthetic. Vittar appears wearing a swimsuit next to Rico Dalasam and some dancers. Filming took place in a studio in Uberlândia, Minas Gerais.

== Track listing and formats ==
- Digital download
1. "Todo Dia" – 2:25

== Release history ==
Country	Date	Format(s)
Brazil	January 12, 2017	Digital download, CD
