= 111 (Pabllo Vittar album) =

Studio album by Pabllo Vittar
- Released: March 26, 2020; November 26, 2020 (Deluxe)
- Recorded: 2019–2020
- Length: 22:25
- Languages: Brazilian Portuguese; Spanish; English
- Labels: BMT; Sony Music Brasil
- Producers: Brabo Music Team; Rodrigo Gorky; Enzo Di Carlo; Weber

Pabllo Vittar chronology
111 1 (2019)	111 (2020)	Batidão Tropical (2021)

Alternative cover
- Deluxe edition artwork

Singles from 111
- 1. "Flash Pose" Released: July 26, 2019; 2. "Parabéns" Released: October 17, 2019; 3. "Amor de Que" Released: December 4, 2019; 4. "Clima Quente" Released: March 1, 2020; 5. "Tímida" Released: March 19, 2020; 6. "Rajadão" Released: July 21, 2020; 7. "Bandida" Released: November 27, 2020

111 is the third studio album by Brazilian singer and drag queen Pabllo Vittar, released on March 26, 2020, by Sony Music Brasil. 111 is a trilingual album, containing Spanish, English and Brazilian Portuguese lyrics. The album is the second part proceeding the EP, titled 111 1 (2019). The album includes collaborations with Charli XCX, Ivete Sangalo, Thalía, Psirico and Jerry Smith.

== Track listing ==
Standard edition
No.	Title	Lyrics	Music	Producer(s)	Length
1.	"Parabéns" (with Psirico)	Pabllo Vittar; Pablo Bispo; Arthur Marques	Arthur Gomes; Rodrigo Gorky; Guilherme Pereira	BMT	2:16
2.	"Tímida" (with Thalía)	Danielle Sanchez; Gale; Bispo	Gorky; Pereira; Marques; Gomes	BMT	2:37
3.	"Lovezinho" (featuring Ivete Sangalo)	Vittar; Bispo; Marques	Gorky; Pereira; Marques; Gomes	BMT	2:18
4.	"Amor de Que"	Bispo; Marques	Gorky; Pereira; Gomes	BMT	2:37
5.	"Salvaje"	Bispo; Marques; Dani Sánchez	Gorky; Pereira; Gomes; Enzo Di Carlo	BMT; Enzo Di Carlo	2:49
6.	"Flash Pose" (featuring Charli XCX)	Aluna Francis; Charlotte Aitchison; Bispo	Marques; Gomes; Gorky; Pereira	BMT	2:32
7.	"Clima Quente" (with Jerry Smith)	Vittar; Bispo; Marques	Gorky; Gomes; Weber; Pereira	BMT; Weber	2:20
8.	"Ponte Perra"	Wynnie Nogueira	Gorky; Pereira; Gomes; Marques	BMT	2:13
9.	"Rajadão"	Bispo; Marques	Gorky; Pereira; Gomes	BMT	2:37
Total length:					22:25

Deluxe edition
No.	Title	Lyrics	Music	Producer(s)	Length
1.	"Bandida" (featuring Pocah)	Vittar; Pablo Bispo; Shande Barão	Arthur Marques; Rodrigo Gorky; Zebu; Maffalda; Wallace Vianna; André Vieira; Breder	BMT	2:26
2.	"Eu Vou"	Vittar	Weber; Maffalda; Zebu; Gorky	Weber; BMT	2:25
3.	"Parabéns" (veronicat & Lucas Boombeat Remix)	Vittar; Bispo; Marques; Boombeat	Marques; Maffalda; Zebu; Gorky; veronicat	BMT	2:20
4.	"Tímida" (A Travestis Remix)	Danielle Sanchez; Gale; Bispo; Tertuliana Lustrosa	Gorky; Zebu; Marques; Maffalda	BMT; Luciano Chavasca	3:05
5.	"Lovezinho" (Jaloo Remix)	Bispo; Marques; Jaloo	Marques; Gorky; Maffalda; Zebu; Jaloo	BMT; Jaloo	2:36
6.	"Amor de Que" (Pabllo Vittar & Getúlio Abelha Remix)	Bispo; Marques	Marques; Gorky; Maffalda; Zebu	BMT	2:52
7.	"Salvaje" (Brabo & Tomasa del Real Remix)	Daniela Lapadula; Bispo; Marques; Tomasa del Real	Maffalda; Gorky; Zebu; Enzo Di Carlo; Bispo	BMT	2:45
8.	"Flash Pose" (DJ Anne Louise & Lorena Simpson Remix)	Aitchison; Frances Noon; Bispo; Andrio Sena	Marques; Maffalda; Gorky; Zebu; Lorena Simpson	BMT; Anne Louise	5:48
9.	"Clima Quente" (Weber & Biu do Piseiro Remix)	Vittar; Bispo; Marques; Biu do Piseiro	Gorky; Maffalda; Marques; Zebu; Weber	BMT; Weber	2:49
10.	"Ponte Perra" (Chediak & Laysa Remix)	Daniela Lapadula; Laysa	Marques; Gorky; Maffalda; Zebu	BMT; Chediak	2:49
11.	"Rajadão" (Alice Glass Remix)	Bispo; Marques; Alice Glass	Marques; Gorky; Jupiter Keyes; Maffalda; Zebu	BMT; Jupiter Keyes	3:29

== Certifications ==
Certifications for 111
Region	Certification	Certified units/sales
Brazil (Pro-Música Brasil)	2× Platinum	160,000^{‡}
^{‡} Sales+streaming figures based on certification alone.
