= Mulú =

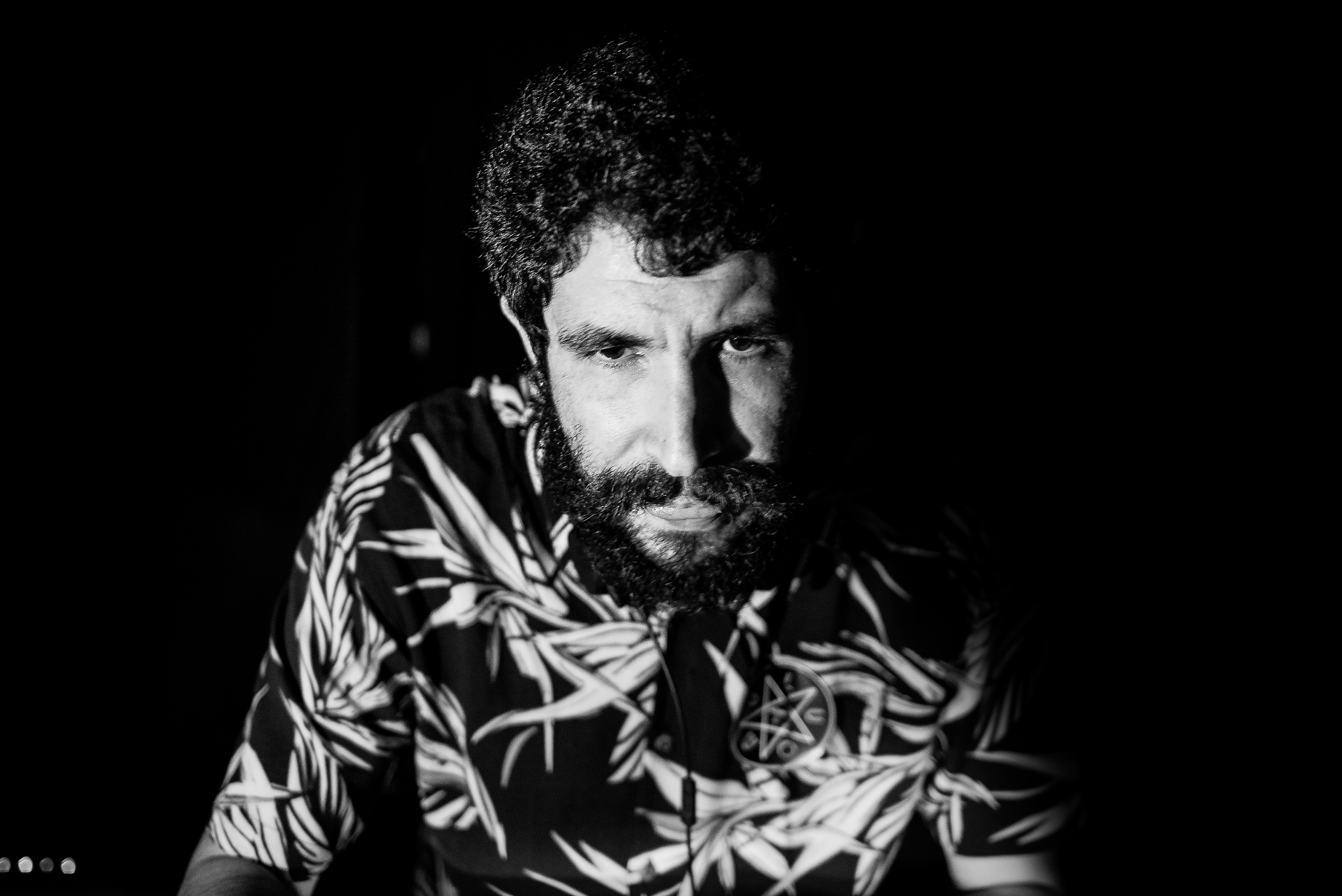
- Mulú

Background information
- Born: Antonio Antmaper
- Origin: Rio de Janeiro, Brazil
- Genres: EDM, rasteirinha, funk carioca, reggaeton
- Years active: 2012–present

Antonio Antmaper, also known as Mulú (formerly known as Omulu), is a Brazilian music producer and composer.

== Biography ==
He is one of the creators of the musical style Rasteirinha, a blend of funk carioca with reggaeton. His productions are supported by some of most famous DJs in the world, such as Diplo and Skrillex.

His sound caught the attention of musical researcher Hermano Viana and national artists such as Zé Gonzales from the duo Tropkillaz, who invited him to his Buuum Trax label, and international artists such as Diplo, who described Mulú as one of his favorite Brazilian artists and as a key person in the connection of Brazilian music scenes in his BBC English radio program.

In 2015, he worked on the production of Pabllo Vittar's debut extended play (EP), Open Bar (2015), being responsible for the singles "Open Bar" and "Minaj". The album mixes samba and other Brazilian rhythms with electronic beats, and to this day is recognized as a revolution in Brazilian pop music.
