= Queen Stars Brasil =

Brazilian drag competition television series

- Genre: Reality competition
- Presented by: Pabllo Vittar; Luísa Sonza
- Judges: Vanessa da Mata; Diego Timbó; Tiago Abravanel
- Country of origin: Brazil
- Original language: Portuguese

Production
- Production company: Endemol Shine Brasil

Original release
- Network: HBO Max
- Release: March 24 – April 14, 2022

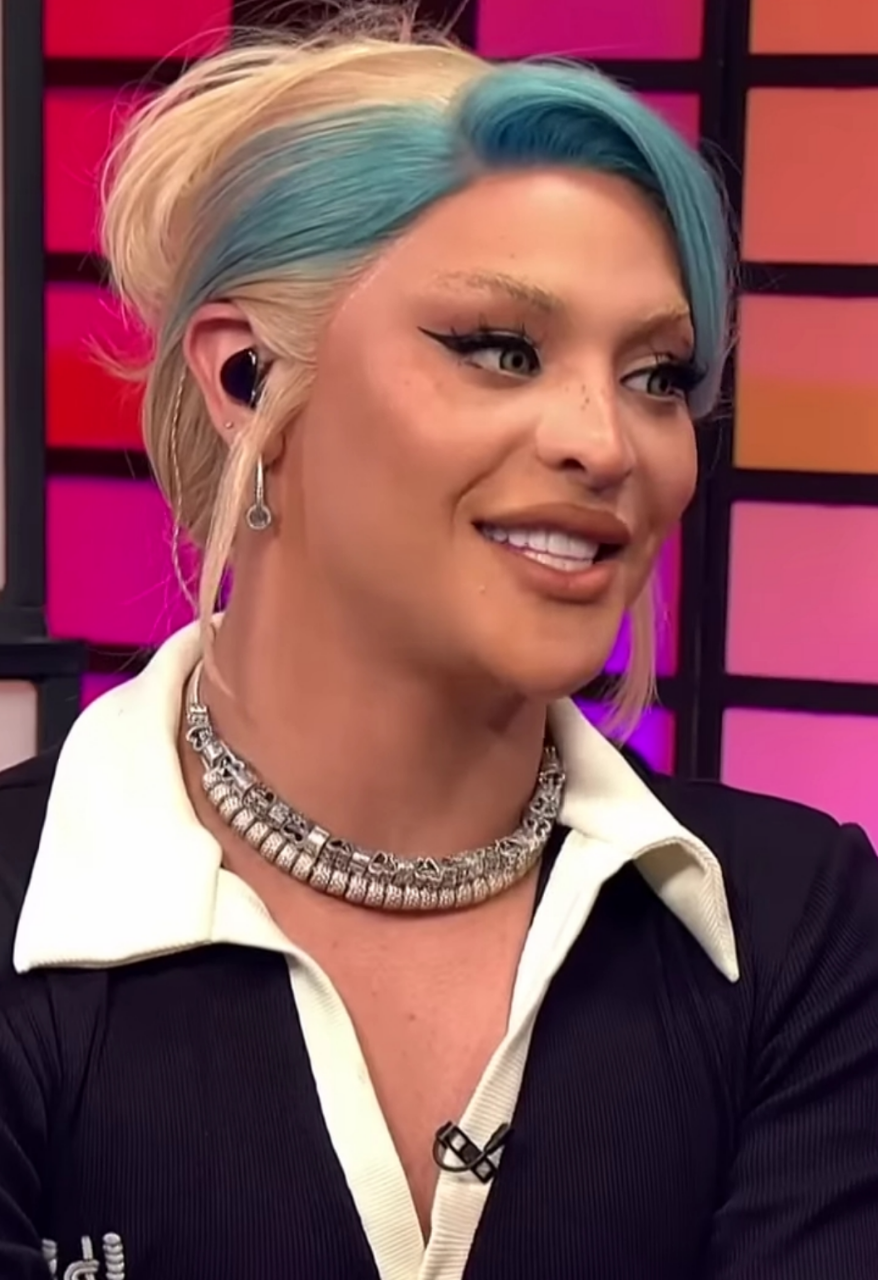
The show is hosted by Pabllo Vittar (pictured in 2024)

Queen Stars Brasil is a drag competition television series in Brazil, hosted by Pabllo Vittar.

== Programa ==
- Pabllo Vittar - presenter
- Luísa Sonza - presenter
- Tiago Abravanel - judge
- Vanessa da Mata - judge
- Diego Timbó - judge
