= Silvetty Montilla =

Brazilian drag queen (born 1967)

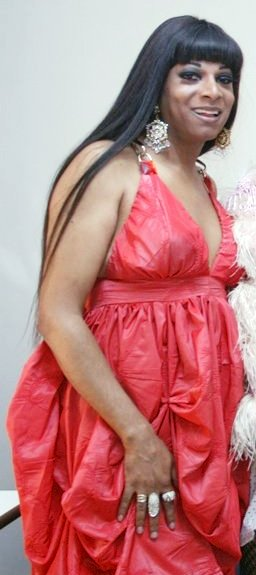
Bernardo in 2009

Silvio Cássio Bernardo (born 10 July 1967 in São Paulo), better known as Silvetty Montilla, is a Brazilian drag queen, actor, comedian, television presenter and reporter. Montilla has acted in several theatre plays, performed regularly in the main São Paulo gay clubs and participated in television programs. He works in comedy clubs and in 2015 has launched his own stand-up comedy piece. He is also a judge on the YouTube reality show "Academia de Drags" (Drags Academy).
