= Noitada =

Studio album by Pabllo Vittar
- Released: February 8, 2023
- Recorded: 2022
- Genre: Pop; hyperpop; mandelão
- Length: 21:55
- Language: Portuguese
- Label: Sony Music Brazil
- Producer: Brabo Music; Ruxell; Tap; DJ Ramemes; Coruja; UhGroove

Pabllo Vittar chronology
I Am Pabllo (2021)	Noitada (2023)	After (2023)

Singles from Noitada
- 1. "Descontrolada" Released: September 22, 2022; 2. "A Meia Noite" Released: October 20, 2022; 3. "Cadeado" Released: May 23, 2023

Noitada (Portuguese: [nojˈtadɐ]; Night Out) is the fifth studio album by Brazilian singer and drag queen Pabllo Vittar, released on February 8, 2023, through Sony Music Brazil.

== Background ==
In the midst of promoting her fourth studio album, Batidão Tropical (2021), Vittar was invited to participate in the remix of the song "Fun Tonight" by American singer Lady Gaga, featured on the singer's third remix album, Dawn of Chromatica (2021). In December 2021, Pabllo celebrates 5 years of his career and releases his first live album, I Am Pabllo, where he recalls songs from his three previous albums. In 2022, the performer became the first drag queen to perform at the Coachella Valley Music and Arts Festival in California.

== Release and promotion ==
The album's cover art, track list and release date were revealed on January 30, 2023, along with the album's pre-release on the Spotify platform. Of the 11 tracks, only "Cadeado" was not made available immediately upon the release of the album on February 10, being released only on February 13 as part of a Spotify marketing action in conjunction with the reality show Big Brother Brasil 23, on TV Globo.

=== Singles ===
"Descontrolada" was released as the first single on September 22, 2022, the song features funk singer MC Carol.

"A Meia Noite" was chosen as the album's second single and released on October 20, 2022, in partnership with singer and drag queen Gloria Groove.

=== Tour ===
Noitada Tour is the fifth world tour by Brazilian singer and drag queen, Pabllo Vittar, to promote his fifth studio album, Noitada. The tour will pass through countries in North America, South America and Europe.

== Critical reception ==
Rodrigo Ortega from the G1 portal, points out that Pabllo "changed his environment: from the Brazilian party of Batidão Tropical (2021) to the dark of an electronic ballad. Columnist Felipe Ernani from the website Quero Mais Discos Que Amigos, analyzes that "Noitada sounds more international than ever, with clear influences from Hyperpop and other similar styles, it also rescues several super Brazilian elements, such as funk and brega that appeared with strength in Batidão Tropical.

== Track listing ==
Noitada track listing
No.	Title	Lyrics	Music	Producer(s)	Length
1.	"Noitada Intro"	Pabllo Vittar	Rodrigo Gorky; Maffalda; Zebu	Brabo Music	0:39
2.	"A Meia Noite" (with Gloria Groove)	Arthur Marques; Groove; Pablo Bispo	Maffalda; Gorky; Ruxell; Tap; Zebu	Ruxell; Tap; Brabo	2:45
3.	"Descontrolada" (with MC Carol)	MC Carol; Bispo; Number Teddie	Dona Nyna; Douglas de Fátima; Gondim; Lukinhas; Maffalda; Multi; Raphael Andrade; Gorky; Ruxell; Tap; Thiago Pantaleão; Zebu	Ruxell; Brabo	2:42
4.	"Calma Amiga Interlude" (with Anitta and DJ Ramemes)	Vittar; Anitta	DJ Ramemes; Gorky; Maffalda; Bispo; Zebu	DJ Ramemes; Brabo	1:09
5.	"Balinha de Coração" (with Anitta)	Andrade; Bispo	Gorky; Maffalda; Ruxell; Tap; Zebu	Brabo; Ruxell; Tap	2:16
6.	"Cadeado"	Vittar; Bibi	Gorky; Maffalda; Teddie; Zebu	Brabo	2:48
7.	"Derretida"	Bispo	Gorky; Maffalda; Bispo; Ruxell; Zebu	Brabo; Ruxell	2:21
8.	"Penetra" (with O Kannalha)	Vittar; Bibi; O Kannalha	Gorky; Maffalda; Teddie; UhGroove; Zebu	Brabo; Coruja; UhGroove	2:09
9.	"Apetitosa" (with MC Tchelinho e DJ Tonias)	Bispo; Andrade; Tchelinho	Gorky; Maffalda; Ruxell; Zebu	Brabo; Ruxell	1:57
10.	"Culpa do Cupido"	Bispo; Andrade	Gorky; Lukinhas; Maffalda; Ruxell; Zebu	Brabo; Ruxell	1:42
11.	"After"	Teddie	Gorky; Maffalda; Zebu	Brabo	1:22
Total length:					22:55

== Release history ==
Release dates and formats for Noitada
Region	Date	Format	Label	Ref.
Various	8 February 2023	digital download; streaming	Sony Music	
Brazil	28 November 2023	LP	Rocinante · Três Selos	
