= Corpo Sensual =

Single by Pabllo Vittar featuring Mateus Carrilho

from the album Vai Passar Mal
- Released: September 6, 2017
- Genre: Arrocha; Tecnobrega
- Length: 2:50
- Label: BMT Produções; Sony
- Songwriters: Yuri Drummond; Mateus Carrilho
- Producers: Rodrigo Gorky; Maffalda

Pabllo Vittar singles chronology
"Decote" (2017)	"Corpo Sensual" (2017)	"Joga Bunda" (2018)

Mateus Carrilho singles chronology
"Corpo Sensual" (2017)	"Privê" (2018)

Corpo Sensual (English: "Sexy Body") is a song by Brazilian singer and drag queen Pabllo Vittar, from her first studio album Vai Passar Mal (2017). It features Mateus Carrilho, vocalist of tecnobrega band Banda Uó. Carrilho and Yuri Drummond wrote the song. The song was produced by Rodrigo Gorky and Maffalda. Vittar performed the song in numerous shows, and on July 27, 2017, it was included in Vittar's Vai Passar Mal Tour. In early July, during an interview to Multishow on YouTube, Vittar said that the song would be serviced as the fourth single from the album. On September 4, 2017, the cover art was revealed.

== Composition and reception ==
Musically, "Corpo Sensual" incorporates tecnobrega and dance pop music. It consists of vocal harmonies and electric drum riffs from the beginning to the end. The track also samples "Rubi", performed by forró band DJavú. Yuri Drummond and Mateus Carrilho wrote the song in October 2016. Music critic Luccas Oliveira, compared the song to the track "K.O.", emphasizing that "Corpo Sensual is a sexy electronic arrocha and Mateus Carrilho was the perfect choice for the song." Corpo Sensual contains more than 295 million views on youtube.

== Promotion ==
Vittar performed the song in numerous shows, such as: Republika, at Cine Joia São Paulo. "SuperMARA" party — attended by more than 5,000 people, on July 23, 2017. On July 27, 2017, it was included in Vittar's Vai Passar Mal Tour. On August 9, Vittar performed the song by herself on Rede Globo's talk show Encontro com Fátima Bernardes.

== Track listing and formats ==
- Digital download
1. "Corpo Sensual" (featuring Mateus Carrilho) – 2:50

== Personnel ==
Adapted from iTunes.

- Yuri Drummond - songwriter, lyricist
- Pabllo Vittar - lead vocals
- Mateus Carrilho - lyricist, featured vocals
- Rodrigo Gorky - producer
- Maffalda - executive producer

== Charts ==
Chart (2017)	Peak position
Brazil (Billboard Brasil Hot 100)	68
Brazil Hot Pop & Popular (Billboard)	9
Brazil (Top 50 Streaming Mensal)	5

=== Year-end charts ===
Chart (2017)	Position
Brazil (Pro-Música Brasil)	40

== Certifications ==
Certifications for Corpo Sensual
Region	Certification	Certified units/sales
Brazil (Pro-Música Brasil)	2× Diamond	600,000^{‡}
^{‡} Sales+streaming figures based on certification alone.
