= Vai Passar Mal =

Studio album by Pabllo Vittar
- Released: January 12, 2017
- Recorded: 2016
- Genres: Pop trap; house; funk carioca
- Length: 32:43
- Labels: BMT; Sony
- Producers: Rodrigo Gorky; Maffalda; Weber; Diplo

Pabllo Vittar chronology
Open Bar (2015)	Vai Passar Mal (2017)	Vai Passar Mal: Remixes (2017)

Singles from Vai Passar Mal
- 1. "Nêga" Released: November 4, 2016; 2. "Todo Dia" Released: January 12, 2017; 3. "K.O." Released: April 19, 2017; 4. "Corpo Sensual" Released: September 6, 2017; 5. "Então Vai" Released: February 2, 2018; 6. "Indestrutível" Released: April 10, 2018

Vai Passar Mal is the debut studio album by Brazilian singer and drag queen Pabllo Vittar. It was released on January 12, 2017. Vittar collaborated with several producers on the album, including Brabo (producers Rodrigo Gorky and Maffalda) and Diplo (who co-produced Então vai). The album incorporates a wide range of genres, including pop trap, funk carioca and house. The album was mixed and mastered in Los Angeles by Gorky & Turbotito.

Vai Passar Mal was well received by the public and music critics for its short and well-produced tracks, with lyrics about self-esteem. The second single, "Todo Dia", has reached more than 50 million views on YouTube in two months, becoming the most viewed music video by drag queen in the world and peaked at number 3 on Spotify's Viral 50 Global list. The third single, "K.O.", broke Vittar's own record and became his most viewed music video with more than 356 million views on YouTube. The song reached number 2 on Spotify's Brazil chart. On August 11, 2017, "K.O." became the first video by a drag queen to reach 100 million views on YouTube.

The photos of the album were made by photographer Marlon Brambilla in a disabled factory of mannequins.

It was elected the 8th best Brazilian album of 2017 by the Brazilian edition of Rolling Stone.

== Controversy ==
On August 1, 2017, the music video for "Todo Dia" was removed from YouTube after the writer of the song, Rico Dalasam, filed a lawsuit against the producers of the song. On August 9, the song was removed from all digital platforms, including Spotify.

== Track listing ==
Standard edition
No.	Title	Writer(s)	Producer(s)	Length
1.	"Nêga"	Rodrigo Gorky; Maffalda; Phabullo Silva	Gorky; Maffalda	2:54
2.	"K.O."	Gorky; Maffalda; Pablo Bispo	Gorky; Maffalda	2:35
3.	"Irregular"	Gorky; Maffalda; P. Silva; Stefanini	Gorky; Maffalda; Stefanini	3:55
4.	"Corpo Sensual" (featuring Mateus Carrilho)	Yuri Drummond	Gorky; Maffalda; Weber	2:50
5.	"Tara"	Drummond	Gorky; Maffalda	3:01
6.	"Todo Dia" (featuring Rico Dalasam)	Gorky; Maffalda; Jefferson Silva	Gorky; Maffalda	2:24
7.	"Então Vai" (featuring Diplo)	Gorky; Wesley Pentz; Drummond; King Henry; Ilsey; Emily	Gorky; Maffalda; Diplo	2:48
8.	"Ele é o Tal" (featuring Rodrigo Gorky, Laura Taylor and Lia Clark)	Gorky; Maffalda; P. Silva; Pedro D'Eyrot	Gorky; Maffalda	2:50
9.	"Pode Apontar"	Gorky; Maffalda; P. Silva; Bispo; Drummond	Gorky; Maffalda	2:53
10.	"Indestrutível"	Gorky; Maffalda; Bispo	Gorky; Maffalda	3:27
Total length:				29:42

iTunes bonus track
No.	Title	Writer(s)	Producer(s)	Length
11.	"Pronto Pra Te Amar"	Drummond	Gorky; Maffalda; Drummond	3:01
Total length:				32:43

Notes

- "Todo Dia" is unavailable on streaming services.

== Certifications ==
Region	Certification	Certified units/sales
Brazil (Pro-Música Brasil)	2× Platinum	160,000^{‡}
^{‡} Sales+streaming figures based on certification alone.
