= Sua Cara =

2017 single by Major Lazer

Single by Major Lazer featuring Anitta and Pabllo Vittar

from the EP Know No Better
- Language: Portuguese
- English title: Your Face
- Released: July 30, 2017
- Recorded: February 2017
- Genre: Moombahton; pop
- Length: 2:47
- Label: Mad Decent; Because Music
- Composers: Thomas Pentz; Boaz van de Beatz; Pablo Bispo; Rashid Badloe; Giordano Ashruf; Rodrigo Antunes; Shareef Badloe; Umberto Tavares
- Lyricists: Larissa Machado; Pabllo Vittar; Jefferson Jr.; Arthur Marques
- Producers: Major Lazer; King Henry

Major Lazer singles chronology
"Naughty Ride" (2017)	"Sua Cara" (2017)	"Leg Over (Remix)" (2017)

Anitta singles chronology
"Paradinha" (2017)	"Sua Cara" (2017)	"Will I See You" (2017)

Pabllo Vittar singles chronology
"Tome Curtindo" (2017)	"Sua Cara" (2017)	"Decote" (2017)

Music video
- "Sua Cara" on YouTube

"Sua Cara" (transl. Your Face) is a song by American electronic dance music band Major Lazer from their fourth EP Know No Better (2017). The song features Brazilian singers Anitta and Pabllo Vittar. The song was recorded in February 2017, shortly after the Brazilian Carnival.

== Background and development ==
Diplo of Major Lazer has always been one of the great supporters of Brazilian funk and Brazilian music. He had previously worked on songs by DJ Marlboro, and even signed the musical group Bonde do Rolê to his label Mad Decent, along with producing songs by Banda Uó and Pabllo Vittar. He says: "I always try to know what happens in Brazil, it's important for me."

While in Brazil for Lollapalooza, in 2016, with his group project Jack Ü with Skrillex, he met singer Anitta, and handed her a demo of what would later become the track. In February 2017, Diplo posted a reply on his Twitter, about a possible collaboration with the singer, simply stating "soon". Anitta announced the collaboration on Instagram Live. Anitta and Pabllo Vittar had a photoshoot on May 21 for the single's cover.

== Music videos ==
A lyric video for the song was released onto Major Lazer's official YouTube account on the day of the EP's release on June 1, 2017. In just one day, the song had already reached 20 million views. The song became the most played song off the album, ahead of its main single "Know No Better", with Camila Cabello, Travis Scott, and Quavo, which had 2.5 million plays. In a publication thanking the success of the song on their Facebook page, a user asked about the music video, and they replied saying "soon".

On the night of June 20, Anitta posted a picture on her Instagram on a plane, stating there was a "surprise coming". Soon after, it was announced that the music video for "Sua Cara" would be shot in Morocco, with production by Bruno Ilogti and Giovanni Bianco; Both worked with Anitta on her 2015 album Bang!. Anitta commented that the video was the "hardest", but would "be worth it". The singers wore costumes by Amir Slama and Yasmine Sterea. There were "tops and bras, plus some hot pants" on the skin color, "in shades of beige and white". The dancers were dressed in pink, to match with the color of the sand.

On July 18, it was confirmed that the video would be released on July 30, during the 'Combatchy' party, held in Rio de Janeiro by the two Brazilian singers. The video was firstly displayed in the event, and later released on the internet. Along with the announcement, Anitta posted on her Instagram profile a video where she appears dancing behind a snake. The making of was released the day before.

The music video was released on July 30 at 4:00 p.m. After just 1 hour, the music video already had more than 2.7 million views and in 2 hours, had already reached 5 million. In addition, the video was the fastest to reach 1 million likes – 5 hours and 38 minutes – on YouTube, breaking One Direction's "Drag Me Down"'s record of 18 hours. The video beat over 25 million views within 24 hours on YouTube, the most since Adele's "Hello" and became the lusophone video with most views in one day on YouTube.

Days after the release of the official music video, a director's cut version leaked on the internet, with unseen scenes in which Diplo appears taking off the helmet in one of the quadricycles, and also different scenes of singers Anitta and Vittar dancing together.

== Chart performance ==
In Brazil, "Sua Cara" debuted at no. 60 on Brazil's Billboard Hot 100 Airplay, where it lasted five consecutive weeks, and peaked at no. 49 in September 2017. In addition, it peaked at no. 5 on the Billboard Brazil Hot Pop & Popular component chart. In Portugal, the song peaked at no. 8 on the pop chart, and no. 7 on the Portuguese digital sales chart.

== Live performances ==
Anitta and Pabllo Vittar performed the song live for the first time on the Brazilian TV show Música Boa Ao Vivo, which is hosted by Anitta for this season and broadcast by cable channel Multishow on July 18, 2017.

Pabllo performed the song alongside Fergie on Rock in Rio Brazil on September 16, 2017

== Accolades ==
Year	Award	Category	Result
2018	Latin Grammy Awards	Best Urban Fusion/Performance	Nominated

== Credits and personnel ==
- Composition – Thomas Pentz, Boaz vd Beatz, Umberto Tavares, Rashid Badloe, Giordano Ashruf, Rodrigo Antunes, Shareef Badloe
- Lyricist - Larissa Machado, Phabullo Silva, Arthur Marques, Jefferson Junior
- Production – Major Lazer, King Henry, Afro Bro's, Boaz vd Beatz
- Vocal producing and recording – Anitta, Pabllo Vittar
- Engineer – King Henry

== Charts ==
=== Weekly charts ===
Chart (2017–18)	Peak position
Brazil (Billboard Hot 100)	49
Brazil Hot Pop Songs (Billboard)	5
Ecuador (National-Report)	59
Portugal (AFP)	8
Portugal Digital Song Sales (Billboard)	7
US Hot Dance/Electronic Songs (Billboard)	26
US World Digital Songs (Billboard)	22
Venezuela (National-Report)	61

=== Year-end charts ===
Chart (2017)	Position
Brazil (Pro-Música Brasil)	5
Portugal (AFP)	52
Chart (2018)	Position
Portugal (AFP)	126

== Certifications ==
Region	Certification	Certified units/sales
Brazil (Pro-Música Brasil)	2× Platinum	120,000^{‡}
Portugal (AFP)	2× Platinum	20,000^{‡}
^{‡} Sales+streaming figures based on certification alone.
