= K.O. (song) =

Single by Pabllo Vittar

from the album Vai Passar Mal
- Released: April 19, 2017
- Genre: forró eletrônico
- Length: 2:35
- Label: BMT Produções
- Songwriters: Rodrigo Gorky; Maffalda; Pablo Bispo
- Producer: Gorky

Pabllo Vittar singles chronology
"Todo Dia" (2017)	"K.O." (2017)	"Sua Cara" (2017)

"K.O." is a song by Brazilian singer and drag queen Pabllo Vittar, released as the third single from her debut studio album Vai Passar Mal (2017). The song was written by Rodrigo Gorky, Maffalda and Pablo Bispo. It was released on April 19, 2017 by independent label BMT Produções. The music video was released on the same day, directed by João Monteiro and includes Malcolm Matheus as a guest, from Rede Globo's program Amor & Sexo.

== Reception ==
The track was officially released on April 19, 2017. On Spotify, the song has reached almost 80 million streams and has become the most successful song by a drag queen. It was also the most heard song in July 2017 in Spotify Brazil.

=== Commercial reception ===
Without a record label, the song had difficulty getting radio airplay, so with its popularity on the internet with several covers, the track ended up being conveyed by popular demand. Thus, the song debuted on Brasil Hot 100 Airplay and Hot Pop & Popular at numbers 78 and 16, respectively.

== Music video ==
Vittar dressed as a boxing fighter in the video.

The video was filmed on March 24, 2017. It was directed by João Monteiro, who directed videos for also drag queens Aretuza Lovi and Gloria Groove. Malcolm Matheus plays a boxing fighter. The music video reached 2 million views in two days and soon consecrated itself as the most watched music video by a drag queen with 26.1 million views, beating Vittar's own record with Todo Dia. As of December 2017, K.O. has surpassed 260 million views on YouTube.

== Track listing and formats ==
- Digital download
1. "K.O." – 2:35
2. "K.O. (Enderhax Remix)" – 4:24

== Charts ==
Chart (2017)	Peak position
Brazil (Hot 100 Airplay)	66
Brazil (Billboard Hot Pop & Popular)	6
Brazil Hot Streaming (Pro-Música Brasil)	20

=== Year-end charts ===
Chart (2017)	Position
Brazil (Pro-Música Brasil)	6

== Certifications ==
Certifications for K.O
Region	Certification	Certified units/sales
Brazil (Pro-Música Brasil)	Diamond	300,000^{‡}
^{‡} Sales+streaming figures based on certification alone.
