= Pabllo Vittar =

Brazilian drag queen and singer (born 1993)

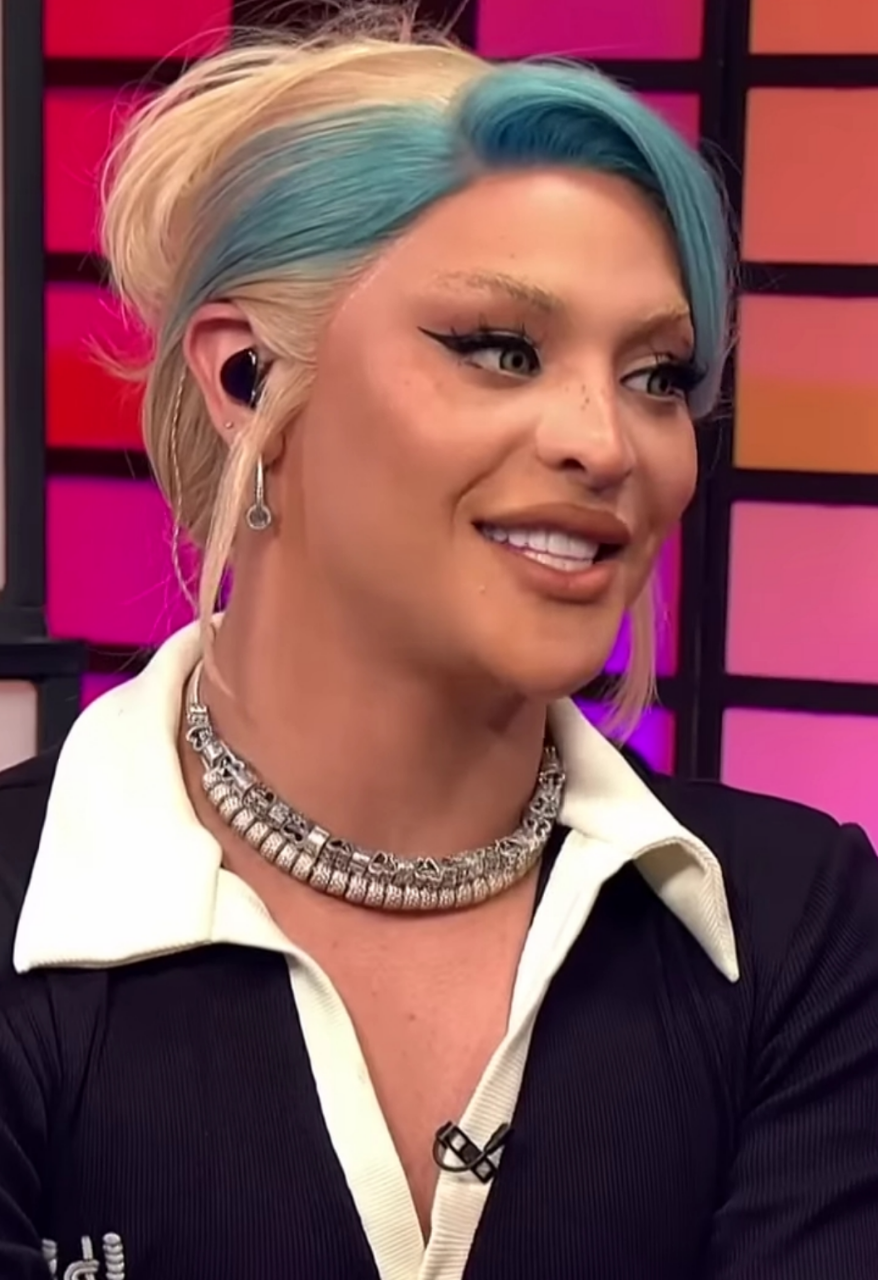
- Vittar in 2024
- Born: Phabullo Rodrigues da Silva; 1 November 1993 (age 33); São Luís, Maranhão, Brazil
- Education: Federal University of Uberlândia (dropped out)
- Occupations: Singer; drag queen
- Years active: 2014–present
- Musical career
- Genres: Pop; tecnobrega; forró; funk carioca
- Instrument: Vocals
- Label: Sony Music

Phabullo Rodrigues da Silva (born 1 November 1993), known professionally as Pabllo Vittar (Portuguese pronunciation: [ˈpablu viˈtaʁ]), is a Brazilian drag queen and singer.

== Life and career ==
=== 1993–2016: Early life ===
Born in São Luís, Phabullo is a fraternal twin and has an older sister. He spent part of his childhood and adolescence living in the cities of Santa Inês and Caxias, both in the interior of Maranhão, due to financial difficulties. He never knew his father, who abandoned his mother, a nurse, when she was pregnant with him. During his childhood, Phabullo experienced bullying due to his delicate gestures and feminine voice. At one point, he was physically assaulted with a plate of hot soup thrown over his face. He attended ballet classes during this period.

At the age of 13, Phabullo joined the choir at a local Catholic church and began doing covers at family parties and school performances. Soon after, he began songwriting. Later, he decided to become a professional, moving to Indaiatuba with his sister, where he worked in several places, such as snack bars and beauty salons. Soon after, he moved to Uberlândia with his mother, who had recently married. He came out to his mother at the age of 15, who had suspected that he was gay, and was something that his sister already knew. His mother, whom he talks to daily, is supportive of his sexual orientation.

"Pabllo Vittar is a boy. Who is a girl. Who has no gender. Who is not afraid. Who prefers a thousand times to be on a stage than anywhere else in the world."

— Phabullo on "Who is Pabllo Vittar?"

He then began to go out for the night in Maranhão, to make friends, and to participate as one of a selection of singers in a house of shows. He started performing his own songs and impersonating celebrities for a small fee, but it was not a professional job. He was now dressing feminine, but did not identify himself as a drag queen; the first time that he did drag was at age 17 in Uberlândia, to publicize a party of his friend by delivering pamphlets at the door of a nightclub. With time, he started performing in LGBT parades in several cities of Maranhão and became known by the state's LGBT community. At age 18, in Minas Gerais, Phabullo started participating in and winning some beauty contests in full drag, before beginning his professional career as a singer while adopting the stage name of "Pabllo Knowles", an homage to singer Beyoncé. His first performance as a drag queen occurred at the Belgrano nightclub, owned by producers Ian Hayashi and Leocádio Rezende (whom Phabullo would later recall as "father" figures).

Still in Minas Gerais, Phabullo took a university entrance exam by the Federal University of Uberlândia, where he was admitted to the full design course in 2013, but after some periods he dropped out of college due to his schedule of shows, which increased greatly due to the success of his music videos on the internet and his participation in the band of primetime television program Amor & Sexo.

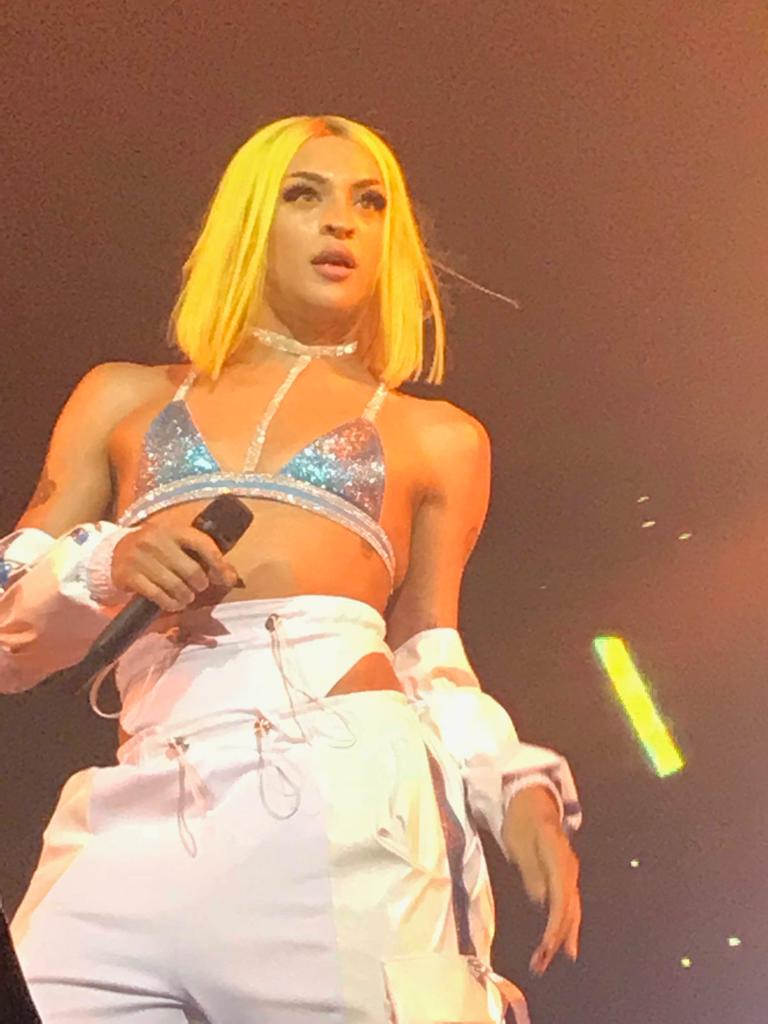
Pabllo Vittar in 2018

When he attracted attention from entrepreneurs in the entertainment field, Phabullo began a professional musical career, performing in bars and concert halls in Uberlândia and cities of the region. In this period, Phabullo adopted the stage name of Pabllo Vittar.

Vittar appeared on TV for the first time in 2014, on a Brazilian talent singing show, performing "I Have Nothing" by Whitney Houston. The rise to fame in mainstream media came in 2015 with the success of music video "Open Bar", a Portuguese-language version of Major Lazer's song "Lean On" with original lyrics, produced by Bonde do Rolê and Omulu. In less than four months, the video reached one million views on YouTube. Vittar also released an extended play with the same name, using pop hits' instrumentals with new arrangements and lyrics.

Vittar has been featured in songs by international artists such as Major Lazer's "Sua Cara" (with fellow Brazilian singer Anitta). The music video was released on 30 July 2017, and reached 10th place on the list of most-viewed online videos in the first 24 hours, with 25 million views. The singer also appears on "I Got It", from Charli XCX's fourth mixtape Pop 2. Vittar collaborated again with XCX on "Flash Pose", released on 25 July 2019; the single was later included on Vittar's album 111. He also got to perform "Flash Pose" at the 2019 MTV Europe Music Awards.

In 2024, Vittar was featured on the single "Alibi" alongside Iranian-Dutch artist Sevdaliza and French singer-songwriter Yseult. The song debuted at number 95 on the Billboard Hot 100, marking Vittar's first entry on the chart and the second entry of a drag queen on the chart in history.

== Artistry ==
=== Musical and vocal style ===
Vittar is mainly a pop singer, although her music incorporates other genres. Her debut studio album Vai Passar Mal mixes pop with elements of electronic music and Brazilian genres such as tecno brega, arrocha, funk carioca, and forró. Music critics noted that her second studio album Não Para Não follows a similar formula, mixing Brazilian and international influences. Speaking about the latter album, Vittar explained: "I lived in Santa Izabel do Pará and listened to cumbia, carimbó, tecnobrega and guitarrada. In Maranhão, I heard axé and Bahia pagode… Pabllo Vittar is all over this album, I cannot go against my origins." Her lyrics often explore themes such as love, self-confidence, and partying.

Vittar is a countertenor with 2.3 octaves of vocal extension already exhibited, spanning from flat E in the third octave (E♭3) to G# in the fifth octave (G♯5). Sérgio Anders, a singing professor at the State University of Minas Gerais, considers Vittar to have "an infantile voice in an adult male". While he views Vittar as a good singer, Anders opines that his technique is not very developed. Shannon Sims of The New York Times described Vittar's voice as a "nasal soprano".

=== Influences ===
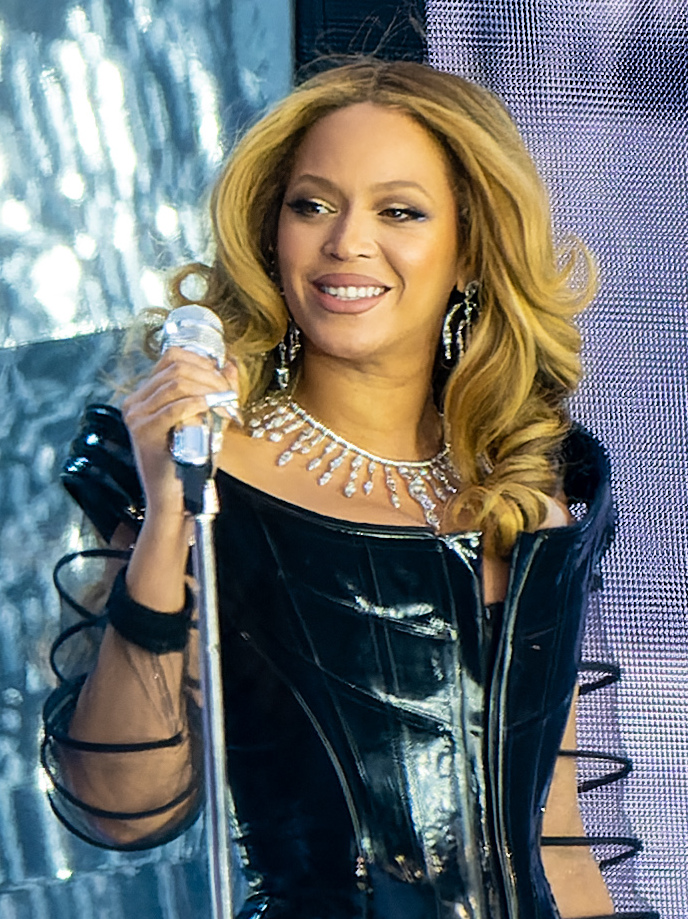
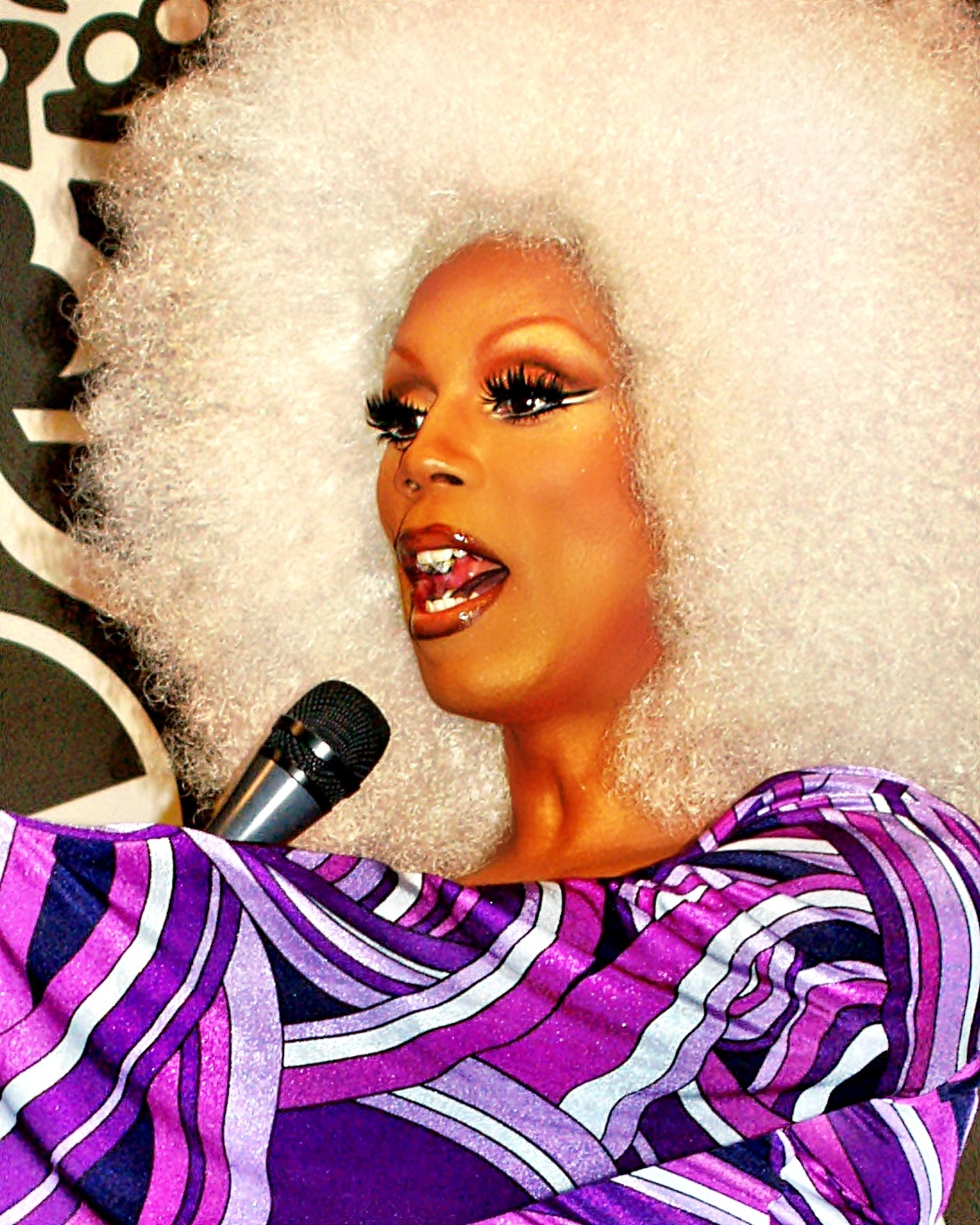
Vittar has cited Beyoncé (left) and RuPaul (right) as two major influences on his work.

Vittar grew up listening to artists such as Aretha Franklin, Donna Summer, Whitney Houston, and Tina Turner, whom he imitated as a child before he even considered becoming a drag queen, as well as Gilberto Gil, Ney Matogrosso, Elis Regina, Alcione Nazareth, and Caetano Veloso. He became interested in drag after watching the reality show RuPaul's Drag Race and cited RuPaul as an important inspiration: "All the drag artists in this world have to thank RuPaul for the visibility we have today." Some participants of the show have also influenced Vittar, notably April Carrion and Naomi Smalls. Top model Bella Hadid is another strong visual influence, particularly on makeup and style. Her music and performances are greatly influenced by bands such as Banda Batidão and Companhia do Calypso.

Early in his career, he used the stage name Pabllo Knowles as a reference to Beyoncé. Other influences include Rihanna, Kanye West, Lady Gaga, and Britney Spears, as well as "Sua Cara" collaborators Anitta and Major Lazer. While making her debut album Vai Passar Mal, Vittar explained that he listened to several artists to find inspiration, citing Liniker and Elza Soares as examples. The album was also influenced by Lana Del Rey, Allie X, Rihanna's album Anti, and Beyoncé's album Lemonade.

== Public image and impact ==
"I think gender doesn't matter to me. If you write 'him,' I'll find it incredible, if you write 'her,' same. But when I get in drag... I won't stand in front of the mirror two hours putting on makeup for someone to call me 'he,' right? Call me 'she'! 'She' is beautiful, 'she' is a singer, 'she' is a drag queen! I like to be called in the feminine."

— Vittar on pronouns

Vittar's music is considered as "unofficial anthems for Brazil's lesbian, gay, bisexual, and transgender community" and he is widely viewed as a voice for them. Because dangers to LGBTQ+ people have grown in Brazil, Vittar's openness about being gay has made him an icon to those living in a prejudiced environment. As an openly gay Brazilian drag queen, Vittar has served as a positive representation of homosexuality and gender fluidity. He has used his visibility to support LGBTQ+ individuals in Brazil and in other countries in South America. He said: "They tell me a lot about their daily struggle to go out on the street being gay, being drag. I want to give them strength so they can continue being who they are." Vittar also appeared on A Força do Querer ("Edge of Desire"), a popular telenovela about a transgender man. After seeing Vittar perform at the Rock in Rio festival, actor Fábio Assunção wrote in a Facebook post: "You represent the possibility of truth in a sea of hypocrisy. Your public figure is the voice of many suffocated people."

In an interview for Veja magazine, Vittar revealed that he chose a masculine stage name because he wanted to be truthful to the public, since he is not transgender. He only acts as a woman when he's on stage as Pabllo Vittar and has a more typical masculine gender expression in his private life. During the same interview, Vittar said he is "making music for humans". In October 2022 Vittar came out as gender-fluid on the PodPah podcast.

Since her debut, Vittar became the most followed and most streamed drag queen in the world, surpassing RuPaul. In 2020, Vittar was featured in a campaign for Calvin Klein, as part of the designer's pride collection.

On 4 May 2024, Vittar performed with Madonna during her The Celebration Tour on Copacabana Beach, in Rio de Janeiro in front of 1.6 million concert attendees. Vittar joined Madonna on stage during a samba remix of her hit song "Music".

On 30 June 2024, The New York Times issued Vittar as "the world's next big drag queen".

On 3 May 2025, Vittar performed as DJ in the opening act of Lady Gaga's Mayhem promotional concert on Copacabana Beach.

== Discography ==
- Vai Passar Mal (2017)
- Não Para Não (2018)
- 111 (2020)
- Batidão Tropical (2021)
- Noitada (2023)
- Batidão Tropical Vol. 2 (2024)
- Lost in Lust (2026)

== Filmography ==
=== Film ===
Year	Title	Role	Notes	Ref.
2017	Oitavo	Himself	Short film	
2018	Crô em Família	Himself		
2020	Emicida: Amarelo	Himself		

=== Television ===
Year	Title	Role	Notes	Ref.
2016–2017	Amor & Sexo	Vocalist	2 seasons	
2017	A Força do Querer	Himself	Episode: "5 October 2017"	
2017	Vai Que Cola	Himself	Episode: "Você Decide"	
2018	Prazer, Pabllo Vittar	Host		
2018	O Outro Lado do Paraíso	Himself	Episode: "11 May 2018"	
2018	Super Drags	Goldiva	Season 1	
2018	Vai Anitta	Himself	Season 1	
2019	Autênticas	Himself	Season 2	
2019	Queen of Drags	Guest judge	Season 1	
2020–2021	Wild & Free	Himself	Season 1–2	
2021	MTV Millennial Awards	Host	2021 MTV Millennial Awards	
2022	Queen Stars Brasil	Host		
2022	Germany's Next Topmodel	Special guest	Season 17	

=== Internet ===
Year	Title	Role	Notes	Ref.
2016	Vlog da Pabllo	Himself	Web-documentary	
2018	Up Next: Pabllo Vittar	Himself	Web-documentary	
2019	Pabllo Vittar: A Trajetória da Artista!	Himself	Web-documentary	
2019	Whindersson Nunes: Próxima Parada	Himself	Episode: Nova Iorque – Filadélfia	

== Tours ==
- Open Bar Tour (2015–2016)
- Vai Passar Mal Tour (2017–2018)
- Não Para Não Tour (2018–2019)
- Não Para Não PRIDE Tour (Summer 2019)
- Não Para Não 2.0 Tour (Fall 2019–Spring 2020)
- Tour with Pabllo (2022)

=== Canceled tour ===
- 111 Tour (2020–2021; COVID 19)

== Awards and nominations ==
Year	Award	Category	Work	Result
2017	Melhores do Ano	Song of the Year	K.O.	Won
2018	Latin Grammy Award	Best Urban Fusion/Interpretation	"Sua Cara" (with Major Lazer and Anitta)	Nominated
2018	MTV Millennial Awards Brazil	Musical Act	Pabllo Vittar	Nominated
2018	MTV Millennial Awards Brazil	MIAW Icon	Pabllo Vittar	Nominated
2018	MTV Millennial Awards Brazil	Selfie of the Year	Pabllo Vittar	Nominated
2018	MTV Millennial Awards Brazil	Fandom of the Year	Vittarlovers	Nominated
2018	MTV Millennial Awards Brazil	Feat of the Year	"Joga Bunda" (with Aretuza Lovi and Gloria Groove)	Nominated
2018	MTV Millennial Awards Brazil	Insta BR	@pabllovittar	Nominated
2018	Brasileiros do Ano	Brazilian of the Year	Pabllo Vittar	Won
2018	MTV Europe Music Award	Best Brazilian Act	Pabllo Vittar	Nominated
2019	British LGBT Awards	Online Influencer	Pabllo Vittar	Nominated
2019	Premios Juventud	Best Choreography	"Caliente" (with Lali)	Nominated
2019	MTV Millennial Awards Brazil	Musical Act	Pabllo Vittar	Won
2019	MTV Millennial Awards Brazil	Fandom of the Year	Vittarlovers	Nominated
2019	MTV Millennial Awards Brazil	Music Video of the Year	"Seu Crime"	Nominated
2019	Gay Times Honours	Drag Hero Award	Pabllo Vittar	Won
2019	Meus Prêmios Nick	Favorite National Artist	Pabllo Vittar	Nominated
2019	Meus Prêmios Nick	Style of the Year	Pabllo Vittar	Nominated
2019	MTV Europe Music Award	Best Brazilian Act	Pabllo Vittar	Won
2020	MTV Europe Music Award	Best Brazilian Act	Pabllo Vittar	Won
2021	GLAAD Media Awards	Outstanding Music Artist	111	Nominated

Year	Award	Category	Result	Ref.
2020	Meus Prêmios Nick	Favorite Artist	Nominated	
2020	Prêmio Jovem Brasileiro	Melhor Live	Nominated	
2020	MTV Millennial Awards Brazil	Musical Artist	Nominated	
2020	Multishow Brazilian Music Award	Clipe TVZ	Pending	

== See also ==
- Zemmoa

== Bibliography ==
- Godoi, Rodrigo Duarte Bueno de; Rosa, Ana Paula da (2022). "Lulapalooza e a toalha mais querida do país: a circulação de sentidos a partir da performance de Pabllo Vittar". Anais de Resumos Expandidos do Seminário Internacional de Pesquisas em Midiatização e Processos Sociais (in Portuguese). 1 (5). ISSN 2675-4169.
- Moreira, Raquel (2023). "Dragging White Femininity: Race and Gender Inauthenticity on Instagram". The Routledge Handbook of Ethnicity and Race in Communication. Routledge. doi:10.4324/9780367748586-8. ISBN 978-0-367-74858-6.
- Serapião, Luis Carlos; Manzano, Luciana Carmona Garcia (2018). "Discourse and Argumentation of the Profan: Pabllo Vittar, The Witch of Satan". Investigação. 17 (2). doi:10.26843/investigacaov1722018 (inactive October 2, 2026). ISSN 2177-4080. Archived from the original on October 2, 2023.
