= Dinho =

Dinho is a Portuguese male name. Notable people with this name include:

- Dinho (São Toméan footballer) (born 2000), also known as Pogba.
- Dinho (Brazilian footballer), Edi Wilson José dos Santos (born 1966).
- Dinho Chingunji (born 1964) a political leader in UNITA, a pro-Western rebel group in Angola
- Dinho (singer) (1971–1996), lead singer of Mamonas Assassinas
- Dinho Ouro Preto, lead singer of Capital Inicial
