= Mamonas Assassinas (album) =

Studio album by Mamonas Assassinas
- Released: June 23, 1995
- Recorded: 1995
- Studio: The Enterprise
- Genre: Rock
- Length: 39:08
- Label: EMI
- Producer: Rick Bonadio

Mamonas Assassinas chronology
Mamonas Assassinas (1995)	Atenção Creuzebek: A Baixaria Continua (1998)

Singles from Mamonas Assassinas
- 1. "Pelados em Santos" Released: July 1995; 2. "Vira-Vira" Released: August 1995; 3. "Robocop Gay" Released: October 1995; 4. "Mundo Animal" Released: December 1995; 5. "1406" Released: February 1996

Mamonas Assassinas is the only studio album released by the Brazilian rock band Mamonas Assassinas. It was released in 1995, and in only eight months (until the end of the band), it sold more than 2 million copies.

== Background and recording ==
Rick Bonadio — nicknamed by the band "Creuzebek" — was chosen to produce the band's debut album. However, their record label EMI wanted at least ten tracks and the band hand only three in hands. In a week the bandmates wrote other 12 tracks that made the cut, but "Não Peide Aqui Baby", a parody of The Beatles's "Twist and Shout", was shelved due to the amount of profanity in the lyrics. The recording took place in São Paulo, on Bonadio's studio, and was mixed at The Enterprise in Los Angeles, United States.

== Artwork ==
The band created the concept of the cover, a drawing by Carlos Sá in which the musicians appear in front of a naked woman exposing large breasts (evoking the pun in the band's name, "mamona" as in "mama", breast in Portuguese), inspired by the Playboy issue featuring Brazilian model Mari Alexandre. EMI later demanded that the band be featured on the cover as well.

== Track listing ==
No.	Title	Writer(s)	Length
1.	"1406"	Dinho and Júlio Rasec	4:08
2.	"Vira-vira"	Dinho and Júlio Rasec	2:24
3.	"Pelados em Santos" ("Naked in Santos")	Dinho	3:23
4.	"Chopis Centis" (Deliberate misspelling of "Shopping Center")	Dinho and Júlio Rasec	2:47
5.	"Jumento Celestino" ("Celestino the Donkey")	Dinho and Bento Hinoto	2:38
6.	"Sabão Crá Crá" ("Crá Crá Soap")	Traditional	0:42
7.	"Uma Arlinda Mulher" (word play with the name Arlinda and the word beautiful in Portuguese (linda), a pun on the title of the movie Pretty Woman)	Dinho and Bento Hinoto	3:18
8.	"Cabeça de Bagre II" ("Catfish Head II")	Mamonas Assassinas	2:20
9.	"Mundo Animal" ("Animal World")	Dinho	3:57
10.	"Robocop Gay" ("Gay Robocop")	Dinho and Júlio Rasec	2:59
11.	"Bois Don't Cry" (Bois means oxen; the word replaces boys to create a pun)	Dinho	2:58
12.	"Débil Metal" (The name is a cross-over pun involving débil mental, mentally disabled people, and (heavy) metal)	Mamonas Assassinas	3:06
13.	"Sábado de Sol" ("Sunny Saturday")	Pedro, Felipe and Rafael	1:01
14.	"Lá Vem o Alemão" ("Here Comes the German")	Dinho and Júlio Rasec	3:24
Total length:			39:08

=== 1406 ===
Satirises "as seen on TV" sales strategies. The title is a reference to the phone number of one of such services, well known in Brazil at the time. The song also includes several English words such as money, good, work, have, and play. The latter 3 being conjugated in Portuguese as verbs, like "Workando" meaning "working".

=== Vira-Vira ===
A Vira-styled song (inspired by the songs of Portuguese singer Roberto Leal), pokes fun at the meaning of the word suruba (meaning "orgy"), which is mistaken for something else by a Portuguese couple. Dinho and Júlio Rasec both provide vocals, with Dinho singing from the husband's perspective and Rasec singing from the wife's perspective.

=== Pelados em Santos ===
Satyrises shallow commercial music, custom cars and the way Latinos are viewed by Americans.

=== Chopis Centis ===
Parody of the main riff of The Clash's "Should I Stay or Should I Go" (with scatological sounds replacing Mick Jones' guitar fills) and pokes fun at the difficulties faced by North-Easterners in São Paulo due to cultural differences as one visits a shopping center.

=== Jumento Celestino ===
A forró parody, tells the story of a man from Bahia coming to "Sum Paulo" in his donkey – which he compares to a car, including installing a stereo.

=== Sabão Crá-Crá ===
A nursery rhyme about toilet soap and men's intimate parts. It is a public domain song.

=== Uma Arlinda Mulher ===
A lovesong in reverse, describing an ugly woman instead of a pretty one. Throughout the song, Dinho intentionally draws out the lyrics and sings off tempo, and during the ending highlights the incoming fade-out ("the song is ending, and Creuzebek is there lowering the volume") and spews nonsense as the song gets quieter. Julio Rasec does an imitation of MPB singer Belchior. The title is a take on the Brazilian translation of Pretty Woman ("Uma Linda Mulher").

=== Cabeça de Bagre II ===
Pokes fun at punks, mostly by saying that they are utterly unintelligent blokes who can't finish their schooling. The title is a possible pun on Titãs' Cabeça Dinossauro.

=== Mundo Animal ===
A series of heavy/dirty jokes about disgusting sexual or scatological facts of animal behavior. Talks about the size of elephant's genitalia or the absence of morals on dogs, as well as implying Camels "carry their balls on their backs."

=== Robocop Gay ===
A discussion of homosexuality starting around a transgender male who is compared to the film character RoboCop in its surgeries and implants. Also pokes fun at religions, including a paradoxical chorus saying that homosexuals are everywhere (even among Muslims and Neo-Nazis) and that they should not be mistreated.

=== Bois Don't Cry ===
The title parodies The Cure's "Boys Don't Cry" but the lyrics and the music are a parody of sertanejo and bolero. Makes fun of a flamboyant macho man who suffers impotent as the woman he loves cheats on him. Features a short synthesizer sequence off Rush's "Tom Sawyer" and "The Mirror" from Dream Theater, and closes with the five-note phrase from Close Encounters of the Third Kind.

=== Débil Metal ===
Sung in mock English, in a Max Cavalera-like tone to accompany the heavy metal style of the song, which was closely associated to Sepultura at the time, is a spoof of heavy metal music. The lyrics, which are nonsensical and contain lines about cookies and popcorn, apparently convey the message that heavy metal fans cannot understand what their idols sing.

=== Sábado de Sol ===
The surrealistic tale of a meal among friends which ends up disrupted by hungry marijuana smokers. It's a cover of the band Baba Cósmica, whose frontman Rafael pressured his father who part of EMI's A&R into bringing Mamonas to the label.

=== Lá vem o Alemão ===
Satyrised pop-samba music (pagode), about a poor man whose girl left him for an alemão ("German", a slang term for white, wealthy people). The title also parodies the song "Lá Vem o Negão" (Here Comes the Black Guy) from samba group Cravo e Canella, which was a hit just two years before the album's release. The song also features well-known pagode musicians doing additional instrumental work: Fabinho from Negritude Júnior and Leandro Lehart from Art Popular.

== Commercial performance ==
The album is the 9th best-selling album of all time in Brazil amongst national artists, and the third best-selling album of the 1990s. The album broke several records previously unseen before in the country, and it remains to this day as the best-selling debut album ever in Brazil, as well as the fastest-selling album in a single day in the country, selling 25,000 copies in just 12 hours. At one point, it sold 50,000 copies per day, 100,000 copies every two days, which granted a Gold certification at the time, and it went on to sell more than 350,000 copies in a week. In less than 100 days the album had sold 1 million copies, doubling that number by December 1995. With 2 million copies sold in just six months, it became the fastest selling album of all time in Brazil. The band dominated Brazilian radio stations and received overall acclaim, making them legends in history of Brazilian music.

== Personnel ==
- Dinho – vocals, acoustic guitar in "Uma Arlinda Mulher"
- Bento Hinoto – electric and acoustic guitar, backing vocals, bass guitar on "1406"
- Samuel Reoli – bass guitar, backing vocals
- Júlio Rasec – keyboards, backing vocals, co-lead vocal in "Vira Vira" and "Uma Arlinda Mulher"
- Sérgio Reoli – drums
- Paquito – trumpet in "Pelados em Santos"
- César do Acordeom – accordion in "Jumento Celestino"
- Fabinho – percussion in "Lá Vem o Alemão"
- Leandro Lehart – cavaquinho in "Lá Vem o Alemão"
- Rick Bonadio – Additional keyboards, triangle in "Jumento Celestino", wah-wah pedal

== Certifications and sales ==
Region	Certification	Certified units/sales
Brazil (Pro-Música Brasil)	Diamond	1,000,000^{*}
Portugal	—	16,500
^{*} Sales figures based on certification alone.

== See also ==
- List of best-selling albums in Brazil
- List of best-selling Latin albums
