= Gloria Groove =

Brazilian singer and rapper

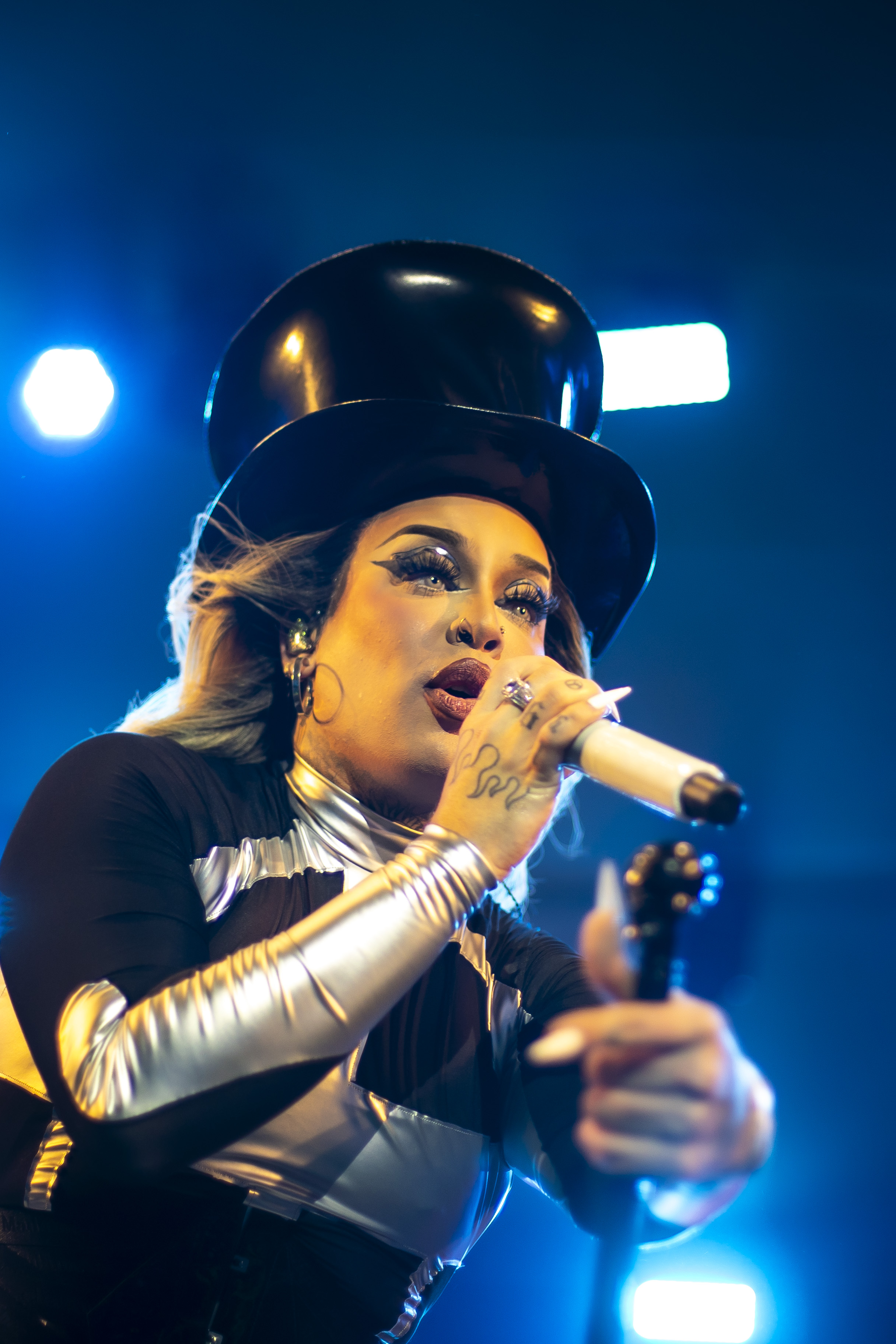
- Gloria Groove in 2023
- Born: Daniel Garcia Felicione Napoleão; January 18, 1995 (age 31); São Paulo, Brazil
- Other name: Daniel Garcia
- Occupations: Singer; songwriter; voice actor; actor; drag queen
- Years active: 2002–present
- Television: A Queen Is Born
- Height: 1.67 m (5 ft 5 1/2 in)
- Musical career
- Genres: Pop; R&B; funk carioca; hip hop; trap
- Instrument: Vocals
- Label: SB Music
- Website: gloriagroove.com.br

Daniel Garcia Felicione Napoleão (born January 18, 1995), known professionally as Gloria Groove (Portuguese pronunciation: [ˈɡlɔɾjɐ ˈɡɾuvi]), is a Brazilian drag queen, singer, rapper, songwriter, actor, and former voice actor. During his childhood, Groove starred in the RecordTV telenovela Savage, and began work as a voice actor. After a period working in theatre as a teenager, Garcia adopted the drag persona "Gloria Groove" in 2014. Two years later, he started gaining prominence by appearing in the TV Globo reality show Amor & Sexo.

Gloria Groove's singing career launched with the release of the single "Dona" in January 2016. After its success, Groove released "Império", and was featured in Carnival hit "Catuaba" by Aretuza Lovi. Groove's first album, O Proceder, was released in February 2017 and was followed by the singles "Gloriosa" and "Muleke Brasileiro". At the end of 2017, Groove released one of the most successful singles of her career, "Bumbum de Ouro". It was followed by peer recognition, which led the singer to feature in several singles such as "Joga Bunda", along with Lovi and Pabllo Vittar, "Arrasta" with Léo Santana, a remix version of Anitta's "Show das Poderosas", and Lexa's "Provocar".

== Biography ==
=== 1995–2016: Early life and career ===
Daniel Garcia Felicione Napoleão was born on January 18, 1995, in São Paulo, to a family of artists. Daniel grew up in the Vila Formosa neighborhood, where he accompanied his mother, Gina Garcia, during her shows. Daniel's mother was a backing vocal for pagode group Raça Negra, while his aunt was also a singer and his maternal grandparents were circus performers. Inspired by his mother, Daniel recalls singing since he was 4. When he was 6, he starred in advertisements for Elma Chips (Brazilian counterpart to Lay's). He then auditioned in the program Domingo Legal, when he was 7, to become part of the band Turma do Balão Mágico (known as "Galera do Balão" at the time); he was a member of the musical act between 7 and 9 years. After performing in Programa Raul Gil as part of a children's gospel group, the ten-year-old Daniel competed at the talent show host by the program. He only competed for two weeks because he was selected to star in the Rede Record telenovela Bicho do Mato (2006–2007). Daniel started his career as a voice actor in this period; one of the major roles was to dub Rico Suave in Hannah Montana. (Note: Daniel continued to work as a voice actor during all his adolescence and after becoming a singer. Some works he did include Justin Bieber in Never Say Never, Chase in PAW Patrol, Jake Holling in Power Rangers: Megaforce, and Mikey Kudo in Digimon Fusion.)

Daniel grew up feeling he was different and was bullied in school. He also attended the Protestant church Reborn in Christ through his childhood until his teenage years and in the church, he learned about soul music and black music. He gradually stopped going to church as he started working in theatre at the age of 14 and came out as gay.

During this time, he played the role of Margaret Mead in an independent stage performance of Hair. (Note: Sources vary on when Daniel played a role in Hair; Globo.com's G1 say it was when he was 15, while Trip and O Povo wrote he was 18.) Inspired by the play's themes, he decided to create a drag queen persona. The theatre made him appreciate the possibility of mixing music, performance, dance, makeup and costume. Watching RuPaul's Drag Race, he concluded he could do his performances not only in the theatre, but also on clubs and shows. At 17–18, (Note: While Universo Online reports 17, Trip informs it was 18.) he adopted the stage name "Gloria Groove", chosen after how hymns are called in Brazilian Protestant churches and the musical term of the same name associated with black music.

Groove worked as "coach" in "Bishow", a segment in the TV Globo program Amor e Sexo in which contestants competed as drag queens. Although the filming lasted until November 2015, the show was only broadcast between January and February 2016.

=== 2016–present: debut as a singer and first album ===
Gloria Groove started a career as a singer by releasing the single "Dona" in January 2016 through the label SB Music. It was followed by the song's music video directed by João Monteiro in March; it was a hit, being watched 1.7 million times in a year. In August, Groove released the single, "Império", whose music video was released in October and was also directed by Monteiro. In November, Groove was featured in Aretuza Lovi's single "Catuaba", which was a moderate success in Brazilian Carnival. First announced as an extended play to be released in March 2016, Groove released the eight-track album O Proceder in February 2017. To promote the album, Groove announced the release of single versions for "Gloriosa" and "Muleke Brasileiro". The former's music video was released in June, and it was released along with "Dona" and "Império" in a mash-up version by ONErpm in November. The latter's music video, directed by Rafael Kent, was released in November, while its single version was published by SB Music in December. Groove was also among the singers chosen to perform "Filhos do Arco-Íris", a single released in June 2017 whose profit was destined to amfAR, The Foundation for AIDS Research.

Since November 2017, Groove is producing a second album. In December 2017, Groove released the first single for the upcoming album, "Bumbum de Ouro", one of the singer's most successful songs and a hit during Carnival. It gained more popularity when the music video directed by Os Primos was released in February 2018; it reached the top of Spotify Brazil's viral chart, and the video was watched over 5 million times on YouTube in three weeks. In January 2018, Groove was featured on Aretuza Lovi's single "Joga Bunda" along with Pabllo Vittar; its music video directed by Felipe Sassi got more than 10 million views on YouTube in a month. In May 2018, Groove released "Arrasta", produced by Os Catioros and featuring axé singer Léo Santana. As a fan, Groove was the one who decided to invite Santana and hoped the partnership would help to reach a wider public. The music video for "Arrasta" was directed by Sassi and was released in June. In the same month, Groove was featured in a remix version of "Show das Poderosas", released by Anitta as part of a Warner Music campaign for the LGBT Pride Month.

Groove's next single, "Apaga a Luz", was released in September 2018 and its music video directed by Sassi was made available in October. A romantic R&B song, it was turned into a commentary on abusive relationships by Sassi. In November, the singer was featured in Lexa's single and music video "Provocar". In January, Groove released the single "Coisa Boa", produced by Pablo Bispo, Sergio Santos and Ruxell. Inspired by Brazilian political context with the election of Jair Bolsonaro, a music video was filmed in a defunct prison after a suggestion by director Sassi. The video was influenced by Lady Gaga's "Telephone" and Orange Is the New Black and was watched by over a million and a half viewers in two days.

== Artistry and public image ==
Daniel defines the "Gloria Groove" persona as "half drag, half rapper", with musical compositions that vary from soul and trap to slower R&B and uptempo Brazilian funk. The singer is also known for performing in drag while singing both "male rapper" parts and "female queer" vocal sections; this is seen in several music videos, including for "Dona", "Império", "Bumbum de Ouro", and "Apaga a Luz". As a "queer, effeminate, non-white drag queen", Groove's has stated that to be a singer is a way to "use my own voice to point out what's wrong [in Brazil]". Since the first song, "Dona", Groove showed this juxtaposition with sarcastic and ironic lyrics, such as "Oh My Lord / What animal is that? / Nice to meet you, my name is art, darling". The singer aims to represent the LGBT community: "My music hopes to signify the existence of thousands of LGBTIQ people—our music becomes a platform of love and self-acceptance."

Groove was influenced by hip hop since childhood in the early 2000s; the singer appreciated male performers and vocalists, including Usher, but the main inspiration to sing came from female artists, including Lil' Kim, Missy Elliott, Nicki Minaj, Karol Conká, and Flora Matos. At first, Groove did not intend to be labeled as a "drag rapper", but later thought it could be something that differentiates the singer's work. While O Proceder was considered to be mostly a rap work, it already included songs that mix rap and pop, such as "Muleke Brasileiro", which was said to be a "reggaeton-like song". Groove's second single, "Bumbum de Ouro", was deemed entirely pop with a funk Carioca inspiration. The singer did this consciously, hoping to achieve a wider fanbase, and it was meant to be the kickoff for the release of a pop-focused album.

Groove has been described as an LGBT "idol" by Brazilian media. The singer was featured in "Rain Power", a photo essay published in the August 2017 issue of the Brazilian edition of Vogue magazine. Despite this image, Groove's songs have also become quite popular among the general, non-LGBT public, and the singer has performed on various live music programs in Brazil, such as Musica Boa Ao Vivo. Groove identifies as non-binary.

== Discography ==
=== Albums ===
Title	Album details
O Proceder	Released: February 3, 2017; Label: SB Music; Format: CD, digital download; Track listing: 1. "Império"; 2. "O Proceder"; 3. "Muleke Brasileiro"; 4. "Problema"; 5. "Gay"; 6. "Gloriosa"; 7. "Madrugada"; 8. "Dona"
Lady Leste	Released: February 10, 2022; Label: SB Music; Format: CD, digital download; Track listing: 1. "SFM" featuring MC Hariel; 2. "Bonekinha"; 3. "Vermelho"; 4. "Fogo no Barraco" featuring MC Tchelinho; 5. "Tua Indecisão" featuring Sorriso Maroto; 6. "Apenas um Neném" featuring Marina Sena; 7. "Jogo Perigoso"; 8. "Greta"; 9. "Pisando Fofo" featuring Tasha e Tracie; 10. "Leilão"; 11. "LSD"; 12. "A Queda"; 13. "Sobrevivi" featuring Priscilla Alcantara
Futuro Fluxo	Released: November 9, 2023; Label: SB Music; Format: CD, digital download; Track listing: 1. "Planeta Ousadia"; 2. "Futuro Fluxo" featuring DJ Tonias; 3. "Ao Som do Tuim" featuring MC Rick, DJ GBR; 4. "Beat Megatrônico" featuring MC GW, Ruxell; 5. "Barulhada"; 6. "Aquecimento Silvetty" featuring Silvetty Montilla, Ruxell; 7. "Bruxaria 3000" featuring MC Aleff, Yure IDD, Pabllo Vittar; 8. "Da Braba" featuring Ludmilla, MC GW; 9. "Entra Na Nave" featuring MC Jhenny, MC Aleff; 10. "Proibidona" featuring Anitta, Valesca Popozuda; 11. "Raio Laser" featuring Thiago Pantaleão; 12. "Modo Xuxa"; 13. "Proibidona SSA RMX" featuring Oh Polêmico, Rafinha RSQ, Anitta, Valesca Popozuda

=== Songs and music videos ===
Title	Year	Album	Music video	Video director
Singles (as lead artist)
"Dona"	2016	O Proceder	Yes	João Monteiro
"Império"	2016	O Proceder	Yes	João Monteiro
"Gloriosa"	2017	O Proceder	Yes	João Monteiro
"Muleke Brasileiro"	2017	O Proceder	Yes	Rafael Kent
"Bumbum de Ouro"	2017	TBA	Yes	Os Primos (João Monteiro and Fernando Moraes)
"Arrasta" (featuring Léo Santana)	2018	TBA	Yes	Felipe Sassi
"Apaga a Luz"	2018	TBA	Yes	Felipe Sassi
"Coisa Boa"	2019	TBA	Yes	Felipe Sassi
"YoYo" (featuring Iza)	2019	TBA	Yes	Felipe Sassi
"Mil Grau"	2019	Alegoria	Yes	João Monteiro
"Magenta Ca$h" (featuring Monna Brutal)	2019	Alegoria	Yes	João Monteiro
"Sedanapo"	2019	Alegoria	Yes	Felipe Sassi
"A Caminhada"	2019	Alegoria	Yes	Felipe Sassi
"Incondicional" (featuring Gina Garcia)	2020	TBA	Yes	Gloria Groove
"A Tua Voz"	2020	Affair	Yes	João Monteiro
"Vício"	2020	Affair	Yes	Flávia Lima
"Sinal"	2020	Affair	Yes	Gloria Groove
"Suplicar"	2020	Affair	Yes	João Monteiro
"Bonekinha"	2021	Lady Leste	Yes	Felipe Sassi
"A Queda"	2021	Lady Leste	Yes	Felipe Sassi
"Leilão"	2021	Lady Leste	Yes	Felipe Sassi
Singles (as featured artist)
"Catuaba" (Aretuza Lovi featuring Gloria Groove)	2016	Mercadinho	Yes	João Monteiro
"Filhos do Arco-Íris" (multiple artists)	2017	Non-album single	No	—N/a
"Joga Bunda" (Aretuza Lovi featuring Pabllo Vittar and Gloria Groove)	2018	Mercadinho	Yes	Felipe Sassi
"Provocar" (Lexa featuring Gloria Groove)	2018	Só Depois do Carnaval	Yes	Felipe Sassi
"Quem Tem Joga" (Drik Barbosa featuring Gloria Groove and Karol Conká)	2019	Drik Barbosa	Yes	Thatiane Almeida and Fred Ouro Preto
"Só o Amor" (Preta Gil featuring Gloria Groove)	2019	TBA	Yes	Rodrigo Pitta
"Sente o Drama" (MC Dora featuring Gloria Groove and Drik Barbosa)	2019	TBA	Yes	
"Lágrima" (Hiran featuring Gloria Groove, Baco Exu do Blues and ÀTTØØXXÁ)	2019	TBA	Yes	BLITZKRIEG
"Alavancô" (Karol Conká featuring Gloria Groove and Linn da Quebrada)	2019	TBA	No	
Non-single album tracks (as featured artist)
"Quebradeira" (Danna Lisboa featuring Gloria Groove)	2017	Ideais and Quebradeira	Yes	Los Cabras (Antônio Adriano and Thiago Reys)
"Liga o Mic" (Murillo Zyess featuring Guigo and Gloria Groove)	2017	No Recinto	Yes	Amanda Gatii
"Necomancia" (Linn da Quebrada featuring Gloria Groove)	2017	Pajubá	Yes	Jup do Bairro and Linn da Quebrada
"Rebola" Iza featuring Carlinhos Brown and Gloria Groove	2018	Dona de Mim	No	—N/a
"Terremoto" (Lia Clark featuring Gloria Groove)	2018	É da Pista	Yes	Felipe Sassi
"Sem Terror" (Quebrada Queer featuring Gloria Groove)	2018	Ser	Yes	Lucas Kakuda and Luiz Becherini

==== Soundtrack appearances ====
List of soundtrack appearances, with album name; credited as Daniel Garcia
Title	Year	Album			
Title	Year	Album	"Correr Pra Viver"	2019	Aladdin (Trilha Sonora Original em Português) (Note: Brazilian Portuguese version of the soundtrack from Aladdin.)
"Correr Pra Viver" (Reprise)				2019	Aladdin (Trilha Sonora Original em Português)
"Um Mundo Ideal" (with Lara Suleiman)				2019	Aladdin (Trilha Sonora Original em Português)
"Correr Pra Viver" (Reprise 2)				2019	Aladdin (Trilha Sonora Original em Português)

== Filmography ==
=== Films ===
Year	Title	Role
2016	TupiniQueen	Documentary

=== Television ===
Year	Title	Role	Notes
2020	A Queen Is Born	Himself (in drag)	Host and judge
2021	Show dos Famosos	Contestant	Season 4

== Voice acting ==
=== Animated characters ===
List of animated characters dubbed by Daniel Garcia in Brazilian Portuguese
Role	Production	Ref.
Doki (2nd Voice)	Doki	
Mikey Kudo	Digimon Fusion	
Holt Hyde	Monster High: 13 Wishes	
Ben	Descendants: Wicked World	

=== Portrayals of real people ===
List of real people dubbed in Brazilian Portuguese by Daniel Garcia
Person	Role	Production	Ref.
Moises Arias	Rico Suave	Hannah Montana	
Patricio Gallardo	Kike	11-11: En mi cuadra nada cuadra	
Azim Rizk	Jake Holling	Power Rangers: Megaforce	
Mitchell Hope	Ben	Descendants, Descendants 2 and Descendants 3	
Mena Massoud	Aladdin	Aladdin	
Leïti Sène	Malick Diallo	Elite	
