= Show dos Famosos =

Brazilian reality singing competition series

- Presented by: Fausto Silva (2017–2020); Luciano Huck (2021)
- Judges: Claudia Raia; Miguel Falabella; Boninho
- Country of origin: Brazil
- No. of seasons: 4
- No. of episodes: 56

Production
- Running time: 60 minutes

Original release
- Network: Rede Globo
- Release: April 23, 2017 – December 26, 2021

Show dos Famosos (lit. Show of the Famous) is a Brazilian reality singing competition series. The series is an adaptation of the Spanish format Your Face Sounds Familiar, featuring celebrities portraying various musicians.

The series premiered on April 23, 2017, airing as a one-hour segment during TV Globo's variety show Domingão do Faustão, hosted by Fausto Silva. In 2021, the series moved to Domingão com Huck with Luciano Huck as host. However in 2022, the series was cancelled after the fourth season. The series is the second Brazilian adaptation of Your Face Sounds Familiar, behind SBT's 2014 series Esse Artista Sou Eu.

== Season 1 (2017) ==
=== Contestants ===
Participant	Occupation (known by)	Result
Eriberto Leão	Actor	Eliminated on 25 June 2017
Enzo Romani	Actor & musician	Eliminated on 25 June 2017
Fafá de Belém	Singer	Eliminated on 25 June 2017
Emanuelle Araújo	Singer & actress	Eliminated on 25 June 2017
Samantha Schmütz	Actress	Fourth place on 2 July 2017
Luiza Possi	Singer	Third place on 2 July 2017
Nelson Freitas	Comedian	Runner-up on 2 July 2017
Ícaro Silva	Actor	Winner on 2 July 2017

=== Elimination chart ===
	1	2	3	4	5	6	7	8	9	10	1–10	11
Ícaro Silva	9.8	—N/a	9.4	—N/a	9.7	—N/a	9.9	—N/a	9.8	—N/a	48.6	9.9
Nelson Freitas	—N/a	9.6	—N/a	9.4	—N/a	9.9	—N/a	9.8	—N/a	9.5	48.2	9.8
Luiza Possi	—N/a	9.3	—N/a	9.7	—N/a	9.6	—N/a	9.8	—N/a	9.8	48.1	9.7
Samantha Schmütz	9.7	—N/a	9.5	—N/a	9.8	—N/a	9.7	—N/a	9.7	—N/a	48.4	9.6
Emanuelle Araújo	—N/a	9.7	—N/a	9.4	—N/a	9.7	—N/a	9.6	—N/a	9.5	47.9	
Fafá de Belém	9.4	—N/a	9.7	—N/a	9.5	—N/a	9.8	—N/a	9.4	—N/a	47.7	
Enzo Romani	—N/a	9.2	—N/a	9.6	—N/a	9.5	—N/a	9.5	—N/a	9.8	47.6	
Eriberto Leão	9.4	—N/a	9.5	—N/a	9.4	—N/a	9.6	—N/a	9.7	—N/a	47.6	

Key
Lowest score
Highest score
Eliminated
Fourth place
Third place
Runner-up
Winner

=== Live show details ===
Night Winner
Eliminated

	Celebrity	Performance	Song	Scores					Result	
	Celebrity	Performance	Song	Claudia	Miguel	Silvio	Studio	Public	Week avg.	Final total
Week 1 (April 23)	Eriberto Leão	Bob Dylan	"Like a Rolling Stone"	9.8	9.5	9.9	Not revealed		9.4	9.4
Week 1 (April 23)	Samantha Schmütz	Elis Regina	"Como Nossos Pais"	9.9	9.8	9.5	Not revealed		9.7	9.7
Week 1 (April 23)	Fafá de Belém	Alcione	"Você Me Vira a Cabeça (Me Tira do Sério)"	9.7	9.9	9.7	Not revealed		9.4	9.4
Week 1 (April 23)	Ícaro Silva	Beyoncé	"Crazy in Love"	9.8	9.8	9.8	Not revealed		9.8	9.8
Week 2 (April 30)	Luiza Possi	George Michael	"Freedom! '90"	9.5	9.7	9.6	8.6	9.2	9.3	9.3
Week 2 (April 30)	Enzo Romani	Charlie Brown Jr.	"Ela Vai Voltar (Todos os Defeitos de Uma Mulher Perfeita)"	9.4	9.4	9.7	8.4	9.2	9.2	9.2
Week 2 (April 30)	Nelson Freitas	Alejandro Sanz	"Corazón Partío"	9.8	9.7	9.8	9.4	9.5	9.6	9.6
Week 2 (April 30)	Emanuelle Araújo	Clara Nunes	"O Mar Serenou"	9.9	9.9	9.9	9.0	9.8	9.7	9.7
Week 3 (May 14)	Ícaro Silva	Alexandre Pires	"Sai da Minha Aba (Bicão)"	9.5	9.4	9.5	9.0	9.7	9.4	19.2
Week 3 (May 14)	Samantha Schmütz	Ricky Martin	"Livin' la Vida Loca"	9.6	9.6	9.4	9.5	9.4	9.5	19.2
Week 3 (May 14)	Fafá de Belém	Maria Bethânia	"Fera Ferida"	9.9	9.8	9.7	9.1	9.3	9.7	19.1
Week 3 (May 14)	Eriberto Leão	Elvis Presley	"Can't Help Falling in Love"	9.5	9.4	9.6	9.4	9.5	9.5	18.9
Week 4 (May 21)	Enzo Romani	Bruno Mars	"When I Was Your Man"	9.8	9.8	9.8	9.2	9.6	9.6	18.8
Week 4 (May 21)	Emanuelle Araújo	Luiz Caldas	"Tieta"	9.5	9.6	9.7	9.1	9.2	9.4	19.1
Week 4 (May 21)	Nelson Freitas	Cauby Peixoto	"Bastidores"	9.6	9.8	9.4	9.0	9.3	9.4	19.0
Week 4 (May 21)	Luiza Possi	Lady Gaga	"Bad Romance"	9.9	9.9	10	9.3	9.5	9.7	19.0
Week 5 (May 28)	Fafá de Belém	Adele	"Rolling in the Deep"	9.5	9.8	9.8	9.0	9.6	9.5	28.5
Week 5 (May 28)	Ícaro Silva	Ney Matogrosso	"O Vira"	9.9	9.8	9.8	9.1	9.7	9.7	28.9
Week 5 (May 28)	Eriberto Leão	Belchior	"Saia Do Meu Caminho"	9.5	9.7	9.8	8.6	9.3	9.4	28.3
Week 5 (May 28)	Samantha Schmütz	Amy Winehouse	"Rehab"	10	10	9.9	9.3	9.7	9.8	29.0
Week 6 (June 4)	Emanuelle Araújo	Donna Summer	"Last Dance"	9.9	9.9	10	9.2	9.8	9.7	28.8
Week 6 (June 4)	Enzo Romani	Jorge Ben Jor	"Taj Mahal"	9.9	9.9	9.5	9.1	9.3	9.5	28.3
Week 6 (June 4)	Luiza Possi	Rita Lee	"Baila Comigo"	9.9	9.9	9.7	9.2	9.5	9.6	28.6
Week 6 (June 4)	Nelson Freitas	Tina Turner	"The Best"	10	10	10	9.8	9.8	9.9	28.9
Week 7 (June 11)	Samantha Schmütz	Rihanna	"Umbrella"	9.9	9.9	9.9	9.5	9.7	9.7	38.7
Week 7 (June 11)	Eriberto Leão	Adriana Calcanhotto	"Fico Assim Sem Você"	9.8	9.8	9.7	9.3	9.4	9.6	37.9
Week 7 (June 11)	Ícaro Silva	Bob Marley	"Redemption Song"	10	10	9.9	9.7	9.9	9.9	38.8
Week 7 (June 11)	Fafá de Belém	Luiz Gonzaga	"Qui Nem Jiló"	10	10	10	9.3	9.7	9.8	38.3
Week 8 (June 18)	Nelson Freitas	Psy	"Gangnam Style"	10	10	10	9.4	9.7	9.8	38.7
Week 8 (June 18)	Emanuelle Araújo	Carmen Miranda	"O Que É que a Baiana Tem?"	9.5	9.9	9.7	9.2	9.7	9.6	38.4
Week 8 (June 18)	Enzo Romani	Kaoma	"Chorando Se Foi (Lambada)"	9.8	9.8	9.5	9.0	9.5	9.5	37.8
Week 8 (June 18)	Luiza Possi	Madonna	"Like a Prayer"	9.9	9.9	9.9	9.6	9.6	9.8	38.3
Week 9 (June 25)	Eriberto Leão	Raul Seixas	"Cowboy Fora da Lei"	9.8	10	10	9.2	9.7	9.7	47.6
Week 9 (June 25)	Fafá de Belém	Angela Maria	"Babalu"	9.9	9.9	9.8	9.0	9.3	9.4	47.7
Week 9 (June 25)	Samatha Schmütz	The Jackson 5	"I'll Be There" with "ABC"	10	9.9	9.7	9.6	9.7	9.7	48.4
Week 9 (June 25)	Ícaro Silva	Ivete Sangalo	"Eva" with "Carro Velho"	10	10	10	9.3	9.8	9.8	48.6
Week 10 (June 25)	Luiza Possi	Zizi Possi	"Asa Morena"	9.9	10	10	9.4	9.7	9.8	48.1
Week 10 (June 25)	Nelson Freitas	U2	"With or Without You"	9.7	9.7	9.7	8.8	9.6	9.5	48.2
Week 10 (June 25)	Emanuelle Araújo	Baby do Brasil	"Curumim Chama Cunhatã Que Eu Vou Contar (Todo Dia Era Dia de Índio)"	9.8	9.8	9.7	9.0	9.6	9.5	47.9
Week 10 (June 25)	Enzo Romani	Lenny Kravitz	"Fly Away"	10	10	9.9	9.2	9.9	9.8	47.6
Week 11 (July 2)	Ícaro Silva	Michael Jackson	"Smooth Criminal"	10	10	10	9.8	10	9.9	1st
Week 11 (July 2)	Samantha Schmütz	Cher	"Believe"	10	10	10	9.3	9.0	9.6	4th
Week 11 (July 2)	Luiza Possi	Shakira	"Whenever, Wherever"	10	10	10	9.3	9.3	9.7	3rd
Week 11 (July 2)	Nelson Freitas	James Brown	"Living in America"	10	10	10	9.7	9.7	9.8	2nd

== Season 2 (2018) ==
=== Contestants ===
Participant	Occupation (known by)	Result
Alessandra Maestrini	Actress	Eliminated on 24 June 2018
Helga Nemeczky	Actress	Fourth place on 8 July 2018
Mumuzinho	Singer	Winner on 8 July 2018
Naiara Azevedo	Singer	Third place Eliminated on 24 June 2018 and returns on 8 July 2018
Paulo Ricardo	Singer	Eliminated on 24 June 2018
Sandra de Sá	Singer	Eliminated on 24 June 2018
Silvero Pereira	Actor	Runner-up on 8 July 2018
Tiago Abravanel	Actor	Third place on 8 July 2018

=== Elimination chart ===
	1	2	3	4	5	6	7	8	9	10	11	12	13	14	1.13-14	15
Alesandra Maestrini	39.7	—N/a	39.6	—N/a	39.4	—N/a	48.3	—N/a	49.1	—N/a	49.4	—N/a	49.3	—N/a	314.8	
Helga Nemeczky	—N/a	39.5	—N/a	38.9	—N/a	39.6	—N/a	48.9	—N/a	49.4	—N/a	49.6	—N/a	49.3	315.2	49.1
Mumuzinho	39	—N/a	39.4	—N/a	39.6	—N/a	49.4	—N/a	49.3	—N/a	50	—N/a	49.8	—N/a	316.5	49.8
Naiara Azevedo	39.1	—N/a	39.9	—N/a	39	—N/a	49	—N/a	49.6	—N/a	49.7	—N/a	49.3	—N/a	315.6	49.2
Paulo Ricardo	—N/a	38.8	—N/a	38.6	—N/a	39.8	—N/a	49.3	—N/a	48.9	—N/a	49.1	—N/a	49.4	313.9	
Sandra de Sá	—N/a	38.5	—N/a	39.5	—N/a	39.5	—N/a	47.9	—N/a	48.9	—N/a	49.2	—N/a	48.6	312.1	
Silvero Pereira	—N/a	39.1	—N/a	39.5	—N/a	38.4	—N/a	49.7	—N/a	49.4	—N/a	49.7	—N/a	49.4	315.2	49.6
Tiago Abravanel	39.8	—N/a	39.7	—N/a	39.7	—N/a	48.7	—N/a	49.6	—N/a	49.3	—N/a	49.6	—N/a	316.4	49.2

Key
Lowest score
Highest score
Eliminated
Fourth place
Third place
Runner-up
Winner

=== Live show details ===
Night Winner
Eliminated

	Celebrity	Performance	Song	Scores					Result	
	Celebrity	Performance	Song	Claudia	Miguel	Boninho	Studio	Public	Week avg.	Final total
Week 1 (April 1)	Naiara Azevedo	Katy Perry	"Dark Horse"	9.8	9.9	9.8	9.6	Not revealed	39.1	39.1
Week 1 (April 1)	Mumuzinho	Péricles	"Eu e Você Sempre"	10	9.9	9.8	9.3	Not revealed	39	39
Week 1 (April 1)	Alessandra Maestrini	Céline Dion	"My Heart Will Go On"	10	10	9.9	9.8	Not revealed	39.7	39.7
Week 1 (April 1)	Tiago Abravanel	Gloria Gaynor	"I Will Survive"	10	10	10	9.8	Not revealed	39.8	39.8
Week 2 (April 8)	Paulo Ricardo	Kiss	"Rock and Roll All Nite"	9.8	9.8	9.9	9.3	Not revealed	38.8	38.8
Week 2 (April 8)	Sandra de Sá	Maria Alcina	"Fio Maravilha"	9.7	9.9	9.8	9.1	Not revealed	38.5	38.5
Week 2 (April 8)	Silvero Pereira	Pabllo Vittar	"Corpo Sensual"	9.7	9.8	9.9	9.7	Not revealed	39.1	39.1
Week 2 (April 8)	Helga Nemeczyk	Luciano Pavarotti	"Nessun dorma"	10	10	9.9	9.6	Not revealed	39.5	39.5
Week 3 (April 15)	Tiago Abravanel	Sidney Magal	"Me Chama Que Eu Vou"	10	10	9.9	9.8	Not revealed	39.7	79.5
Week 3 (April 15)	Mumuzinho	Ludmilla	"Hoje"	9.9	10	9.9	9.6	Not revealed	39.4	78.4
Week 3 (April 15)	Alessandra Maestrini	Axl Rose	"Sweet Child o' Mine"	10	10	9.9	9.7	Not revealed	39.6	79.3
Week 3 (April 15)	Naiara Azevedo	Joelma	"Voando Pro Pará"	10	10	10	9.9	Not revealed	39.9	79
Week 4 (April 22)	Helga Nemeczyk	Madonna	"Material Girl"	9.9	9.8	9.8	9.4	Not revealed	38.9	78.4
Week 4 (April 22)	Paulo Ricardo	Luis Fonsi	"Despacito"	9.7	9.8	9.8	9.3	Not revealed	38.6	77.4
Week 4 (April 22)	Sandra de Sá	Jamelão	"Exaltação à Mangueira"	9.8	9.9	9.9	9.9	Not revealed	39.5	78
Week 4 (April 22)	Silvero Pereira	Freddie Mercury	"I Want to Break Free"	9.9	9.8	9.9	9.9	Not revealed	39.5	78.6
Week 5 (April 29)	Alessandra Maestrini	Tetê Espíndola	"Escrito nas Estrelas"	9.9	10	9.9	9.6	Not revealed	39.4	118.7
Week 5 (April 29)	Tiago Abravanel	Elton John	"Circle of Life"	10	10	9.9	9.8	Not revealed	39.7	119.2
Week 5 (April 29)	Naiara Azevedo	Cyndi Lauper	"Girls Just Want to Have Fun"	9.8	9.9	9.8	9.5	Not revealed	39	118
Week 5 (April 29)	Mumuzinho	Wilson Simonal	"Sá Marina"	10	9.9	9.9	9.8	Not revealed	39.6	118
Week 6 (May 6)	Silvero Pereira	Gal Costa	"Festa do Interior"	9.5	9.8	9.7	9.4	Not revealed	38.4	117
Week 6 (May 6)	Sandra de Sá	Aretha Franklin	"I Say a Little Prayer"	10	10	9.9	9.6	Not revealed	39.5	117.5
Week 6 (May 6)	Helga Nemeczyk	Ana Carolina	"Garganta"	10	9.9	10	9.7	Not revealed	39.6	118
Week 6 (May 6)	Paulo Ricardo	Mamonas Assassinas	"Pelados em Santos"	10	10	9.9	9.9	Not revealed	39.8	117.2
Week 7 (May 13)	Naiara Azevedo	Claudia Leitte	"Claudinha Bagunceira"	10	10	9.9	9.7	9.4	49	167
Week 7 (May 13)	Tiago Abravanel	Rosanah	"O Amor e o Poder"	9.8	9.8	9.9	9.7	9.5	48.7	167.9
Week 7 (May 13)	Mumuzinho	Stevie Wonder	"Isn't She Lovely"	10	10	9.9	9.8	9.7	49.4	167.4
Week 7 (May 13)	Alessandra Maestrini	Lady Gaga	"Born This Way"	9.8	9.8	9.9	9.5	9.3	48.3	167
Week 8 (May 20)	Paulo Ricardo	Beth Carvalho	"Coisinha do Pai"	10	10	10	9.7	9.6	49.3	166.5
Week 8 (May 20)	Helga Nemeczyk	Gretchen	"Conga Conga Conga"	9.9	9.9	9.9	9.6	9.6	48.9	166.9
Week 8 (May 20)	Sandra de Sá	Margareth Menezes	"Dandalunda"	9.8	9.8	9.8	9.3	9.2	47.9	165.4
Week 8 (May 20)	Silvero Pereira	Aerosmith	"Crazy"	10	9.9	9.9	9.9	10	49.7	166.7
Week 9 (May 27)	Mumuzinho	Cartola	"As Rosas não Falam" with "O Sol Nascerá"	10	10	9.9	9.6	9.8	49.3	216.7
Week 9 (May 27)	Alessandra Maestrini	Fernanda Abreu	"Rio 40 Graus"	10	10	9.9	9.6	9.6	49.1	216.1
Week 9 (May 27)	Naiara Azevedo	Shakira	"Estoy Aquí"	10	10	10	9.8	9.8	49.6	216.6
Week 9 (May 27)	Tiago Abravanel	Tim Maia	"Me Dê Motivo" with "O Descobridor dos Sete Mares"	10	10	9.9	9.8	9.9	49.6	217.5
Week 10 (June 3)
Week 10 (June 3)	Silvero Pereira	Wesley Safadão	"Ar Condicionado no 15"	9.9	10	9.9	9.7	9.9	49.4	216.1
Week 10 (June 3)	Paulo Ricardo	Frank Sinatra	"I've Got You Under My Skin"	9.8	9.8	9.9	9.7	9.7	48.9	215.4
Week 10 (June 3)	Helga Nemeczyk	Roberto Leal	"Arrebita"	10	10	10	9.8	9.6	49.4	216.3
Week 10 (June 3)	Sandra de Sá	Dalva de Oliveira	"Bandeira Branca"	9.8	9.9	9.8	9.7	9.7	48.9	214.3
Week 11 (June 10)	Alessandra Maestrini	Taylor Swift	"I Knew You Were Trouble"	10	10	10	9.8	9.6	49.4	265.5
Week 11 (June 10)	Tiago Abravanel	Gaby Amarantos	"Ex Mai Love"	9.9	9.9	10	9.8	9.7	49.3	266.8
Week 11 (June 10)	Naiara Azevedo	Justin Bieber	"Baby"	10	10	10	9.9	9.8	49.7	266.3
Week 11 (June 10)	Mumuzinho	Alcione	"A Loba"	10	10	10	10	10	50	266.7
Week 12 (June 17)	Sandra de Sá	Tina Turner	"We Don't Need Another Hero (Thunderdome)"	10	10	9.9	9.7	9.6	49.2	263.5
Week 12 (June 17)	Silvero Pereira	Ney Matogrosso	"Homem com H"	10	10	9.9	9.9	9.7	49.7	265.8
Week 12 (June 17)	Helga Nemeczyk	Janis Joplin	"Piece of My Heart"	10	10	10	9.9	9.7	49.6	265.9
Week 12 (June 17)	Paulo Ricardo	Roberto Carlos	"Eu Sou Terrível"	10	10	9.8	9.6	9.7	49.1	264.5
Week 13 (June 24)	Mumuzinho	Louis Armstrong	"What a Wonderful World"	10	10	10	9.9	9.9	49.8	316.5
Week 13 (June 24)	Alessandra Maestrini	Whitney Houston	"One Moment in Time"	10	10	9.9	9.8	9.6	49.3	314.8
Week 13 (June 24)	Tiago Abravanel	Nelson Ned	"Tudo Passará"	10	9.9	9.9	10	9.8	49.6	316.4
Week 13 (June 24)	Naiara Azevedo	Adele	"Someone like You"	9.8	9.9	10	9.8	9.8	49.3	315.6
Week 14 (July 1)	Helga Nemeczyk	Beyoncé	"Run the World (Girls)"	10	10	9.9	9.8	9.6	49.3	315.2
Week 14 (July 1)	Paulo Ricardo	John Lennon	"Imagine"	9.9	10	9.9	9.9	9.7	49.4	313.9
Week 14 (July 1)	Sandra de Sá	Gilberto Gil	"Aquele Abraço"	9.8	9.9	9.8	9.7	9.4	48.6	312.1
Week 14 (July 1)	Silvero Pereira	Cher	"Strong Enough"	9.9	9.8	9.9	9.9	9.9	49.4	315.2
Week 15 (July 8)	Naiara Azevedo	Anitta	"Show das Poderosas"	9.9	10	9.9	9.7	9.7	49.2	3rd
Week 15 (July 8)	Tiago Abravanel	Milton Nascimento	"Canção da América" with "Maria, Maria"	9.9	9.9	9.9	9.8	9.7	49.2	3rd
Week 15 (July 8)	Mumuzinho	Dona Ivone Lara	"Alguém Me Avisou" with "Sonho Meu"	10	10	10	9.9	9.9	49.8	1st
Week 15 (July 8)	Silvero Pereira	Édith Piaf	"Non, je ne regrette rien"	9.9	9.9	10	9.9	9.9	49.6	2nd
Week 15 (July 8)	Helga Nemeczyk	Liza Minnelli	"New York, New York"	10	9.9	9.9	9.7	9.6	49.1	4th

== See also ==
- Show dos Famosos (season 4)
