= Pelados em Santos =

1995 single by Mamonas Assassinas

Single by Mamonas Assassinas

from the album Mamonas Assassinas
- Released: July 1995
- Recorded: 1995
- Genre: Comedy rock, Novelty song, Pop rock
- Length: 3:23
- Label: EMI
- Songwriter: Dinho
- Producer: Rick Bonadio

Mamonas Assassinas singles chronology
"Pelados em Santos" (1995)	"Vira-Vira" (1995)

"Pelados em Santos" (Portuguese for "Naked in Santos") is a pop rock song written by Alecsander Alves (better known as Dinho) and performed by the Brazilian comedy rock band Mamonas Assassinas. It was released in July 1995 as part of the band's only studio album, Mamonas Assassinas, through EMI. The song became a commercial success in Brazil and in several Latin American countries.

== Composition and background ==
Mamonas Assassinas was originally founded by Bento Hinoto and brothers Sérgio and Samuel Reoli under the name Utopia; Dinho and Júlio Rasec later joined the group. Initially, the band's repertoire consisted of serious original material and cover versions of contemporary artists such as Titãs.

The song that later became "Pelados em Santos" was initially written in 1991, with at least one verse added the following year during a trip to Praia Grande. According to accounts, Dinho began singing an early version of the song while playing guitar after asking friends what they considered the most ostentatious car, which inspired additional lyrics. The response cited was a yellow Brasília with enlarged wheels.

In 1992, Utopia contracted Brazilian producer Rick Bonadio, owner of a studio that recorded emerging artists, to produce a self-titled debut album, reportedly pressed in a run of one million copies. The release was a commercial failure, selling approximately 100 copies. Following this, Dinho continued to undertake small jobs at the studio. During a period of downtime caused by the absence of a scheduled sertanejo duo, he requested studio time to record novelty songs overnight. Among these recordings was "Mina (Minha Pitchulinha)", an early version of the song that was slower in tempo, featured deliberately exaggerated vocals in the style of Reginaldo Rossi, and had lyrics completed during the recording process.

Producers Bonadio and Rodrigo Castanho identified commercial potential in the song and suggested that it be re-recorded with a heavier rock arrangement. As a result, the group adopted a more comedic style and changed its name to Mamonas Assassinas. The reworked band re-recorded "Mina (Minha Pitchulinha)" with a heavier sound and retitled it "Pelados em Santos". Two additional songs, "[ [Robocop Gay] ]" and "[ [Vira-Vira] ]", were also recorded and included on a demo tape sent to major record labels, one of which, EMI, subsequently signed the group.

Musically, the instrumental structure of "Pelados em Santos" has been noted as bearing similarities to "Crocodile Rock" by Elton John, one of the band's cited influences.

== Music video ==
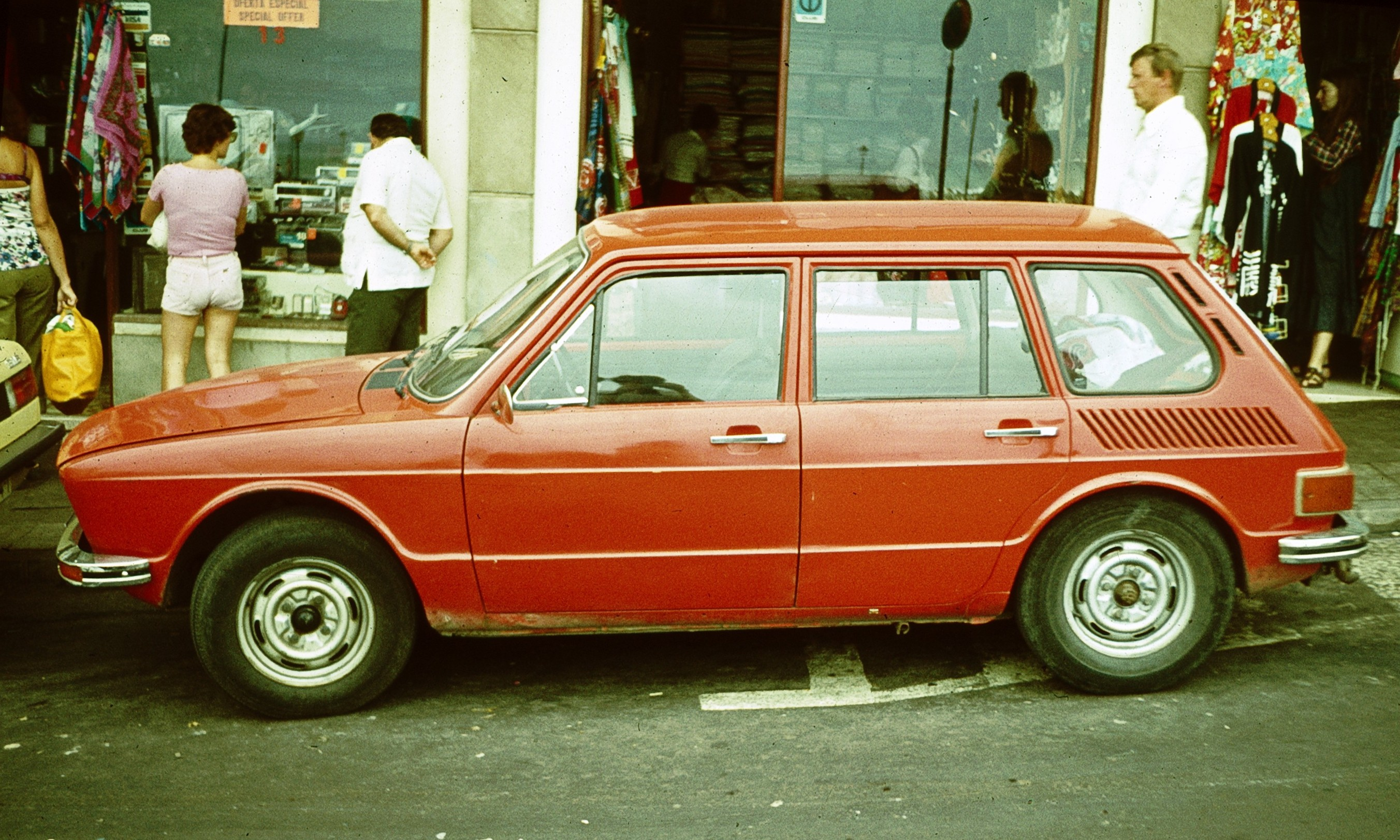
A customised yellow Brasília featured prominently in the original "Pelados em Santos" music video.

"Pelados em Santos" received a music video, making it one of only two music videos produced by the band, the other being "Vira-Vira".

In the video, the band members appear wearing outfits similar to those they typically used during live performances and television appearances. In several scenes, Júlio Rasec is dressed as a mariachi, reflecting the group's humorous approach. The video combines live-action footage with animated elements.

The blonde woman wearing a red dress who appears in the video is model Nereide Nogueira.

== Reception and legacy ==
"Pelados em Santos" was the third most played song on Brazilian radio in its year of release. According to the Escritório Central de Arrecadação e Distribuição, it was the most frequently played song by Mamonas Assassinas and ranked among the most played songs by all artists in Brazil between 2004 and 2015.

The yellow 1977 Brasília featured in the music video belonged to the grandmother of Mirella Zacanini, who was then married to Dinho. The original vehicle was later auctioned on the television programme Domingo Legal. Subsequently, it was seized by highway police due to missing documentation, but Dinho's family recovered it in 2015 in poor condition. A different Brasília was later modified using parts from the original car and has since been displayed at classic car events.

== Cover versions ==
"Pelados em Santos"

Single by Titãs

from the album As Dez Mais
- Released: 1999
- Label: WEA
- Songwriter: Dinho

Titãs singles chronology
"É Preciso Saber Viver" (1998)	"Pelados em Santos" (1999)	"Aluga-se" (2000)

The Brazilian rock band Titãs recorded a cover version of "Pelados em Santos" in 1999 for their covers album As Dez Mais.

=== Music video ===
The music video features the band members presenting a range of fictional products branded as "Titãs" (including banks, whisky, and food items) in a studio styled after a Bombril television commercial. The video is introduced by Washington Olivetto, who was also responsible for the original Bombril advertising campaigns. These scenes are intercut with shots of nude women holding copies of the As Dez Mais CD.

The video includes appearances by Carlos Moreno, Bárbara Paz, and Cheila Ferlin.

Midway through the video, a fictional brand of oversized cigarettes, "Titãs Lights", is introduced by Olivetto. A warning displayed in the upper-left corner reads: "Os Titãs advertem: O Ministério faz mal à sua saúde" ("Titãs warn: the Ministry is unhealthy for you"), parodying the mandatory Brazilian health warning found on cigarette packaging and advertising: "O Ministério da Saúde adverte: fumar é prejudicial à saúde" ("The Ministry of Health warns: smoking is harmful to your health").

Additional scenes depict Tony Bellotto simulating sexual activity with a sex doll, band members posing with the nude models, and a final group shot in which all band members and Olivetto sing the song together.

According to the band, the decision to invite Washington Olivetto was intended to play on their reputation as a "commercial" band, framing the performance as if it were an advertisement for the song itself, which they described as the rationale behind the video's concept.
