= Show dos Famosos season 4 =

Show dos Famosos
- Season 4
- Hosted by: Luciano Huck
- Judges: Claudia Raia; Boninho; Preta Gil
- Winner: Gloria Groove
- Runners-up: Wanessa Camargo; Vitor Kley

Release
- Original network: TV Globo
- Original release: September 5 – December 26, 2021

The fourth season of Show dos Famosos premiered on September 5, 2021, at 8:00 / 7:00 p.m. (BRT / AMT) on TV Globo.

It is the first season hosted by Luciano Huck and airing as a segment on Domingão com Huck, following Fausto Silva's departure from the network and, subsequently, the cancellation of Domingão do Faustão.

The season was originally expected to air in 2020, but production was postponed due to safety concerns resulting from the COVID-19 pandemic. The original cast were: Alexandre Pires, Barbara Fialho, Cleo, Diogo Vilela, Lexa, Margareth Menezes, Thiago Arancam and Vitor Kley. However, when production resumed in 2021, only Margareth, Thiago and Vitor still took part of the season.

Claudia Raia and Boninho returned as judges for their third and second seasons, respectively, while Miguel Falabella was replaced by Preta Gil. Xuxa, Angélica, Regina Casé and Juliana Paes filled in for Claudia as guest judges during the first four weeks of the show.

On December 26, 2021, Gloria Groove won the competition over Wanessa Camargo, Vitor Kley and Robson Nunes, thus becoming the first drag artist to win the show.

== Cast ==
Celebrity	Notability (known for)	Status
Thiago Arancam	Singer	Eliminated 1st on November 14, 2021
Fiuk	Actor & singer	Eliminated 2nd on November 21, 2021
Diego Hypolito	Olympic gymnast	Eliminated 3rd on November 28, 2021
Margareth Menezes	Singer	Eliminated 4th on December 19, 2021
Mariana Rios	Actress	Eliminated 5th on December 19, 2021
Robson Nunes	Actor	Fourth place on December 26, 2021
Vitor Kley	Singer	Runner-up on December 26, 2021
Wanessa Camargo	Singer	Runner-up on December 26, 2021
Gloria Groove	Singer & Drag queen	Winner on December 26, 2021

== Elimination chart ==
Contestant	1	2	3	4	5	6	7	8	9	10	11	12	13	14	15	13–15	Final
Gloria	1st 39.6	—	—	1st 39.8	—	—	2nd 39.8	—	—	—	1st 40.0	—	1st 40.0	—	1st 39.9	1st 79.9	Winner; 2/4 votes
Wanessa	—	1st 39.8	—	—	1st 39.9	—	—	1st 39.9	—	2nd 39.9	—	—	—	1st 40.0	3rd 79.8	2nd 79.8	Runner-up; 1/4 votes
Vitor	—	2nd 39.7	—	—	2nd 39.8	—	—	2nd 39.8	—	1st 40.0	—	—	—	2nd 39.6	1st 39.9	3rd 79.5	Runner-up; 1/4 votes
Robson	—	—	2nd 39.5	—	—	1st 39.7	—	—	2nd 39.6	—	—	1st 40.0	2nd 39.7	—	4th 39.6	4th 79.3	Fourth place 0/4 votes
Mariana	—	—	1st 39.7	—	—	2nd 39.6	—	—	1st 39.9	—	—	2nd 39.8	3rd 39.6	—	4th 39.6	5th 79.2	Eliminated (week 15)
Margareth	3rd 39.5	—	—	2nd 39.7	—	—	1st 39.9	—	—	—	3rd 39.8	—	—	3rd 39.3	6th 39.5	6th 78.8	Eliminated (week 15)
Diego	—	—	3rd 39.4	—	—	3rd 39.1	—	—	3rd 39.5	—	—	3rd 39.4	Eliminated (week 12)				
Fiuk	1st 39.6	—	—	3rd 39.5	—	—	3rd 39.5	—	—	—	1st 40.0	Eliminated (week 11)					
Thiago	—	3rd 39.5	—	—	3rd 39.6	—	—	3rd 39.6	—	2nd 39.9	Eliminated (week 10)						

Key

Contestant came in first that week
Contestant came in last that week
Contestant advanced to the finals
Contestant was eliminated

Winner
Runner-up
Third place
Fourth place

== Weekly results ==
=== Week 1 ===
Group A – Round 1

- Guest judge: Xuxa

Celebrity	Performing as	Song	Scores				Week total	Final total
Celebrity	Performing as	Song	Xuxa	Boninho	Preta	Studio	Week total	Final total
Margareth Menezes	Neguinho da Beija-Flor	"O Campeão"	10	9.7	10	9.8	39.5	N/A
Gloria Groove	Xanddy	"Vêm Nênem"	10	9.8	10	9.8	39.6	N/A
Fiuk	Amy Winehouse	"Valerie"	10	9.7	10	9.9	39.6	N/A

=== Week 2 ===
Group B – Round 1

- Guest judge: Angélica

Celebrity	Performing as	Song	Scores				Week total	Final total
Celebrity	Performing as	Song	Angélica	Boninho	Preta	Studio	Week total	Final total
Vitor Kley	Pitty	"Admirável Chip Novo"	10	9.9	10	9.8	39.7	N/A
Thiago Arancam	Daniel	"Eu Me Amarrei" / "A Jiripoca Vai Piar"	10	9.8	10	9.7	39.5	N/A
Wanessa Camargo	Celine Dion	"The Power of Love"	10	9.9	10	9.9	39.8	N/A

=== Week 3 ===
Group C – Round 1

- Guest judge: Regina Casé

Celebrity	Performing as	Song	Scores				Week total	Final total
Celebrity	Performing as	Song	Regina	Boninho	Preta	Studio	Week total	Final total
Robson Nunes	Arlindo Cruz	"O Bem"	10	9.7	10	9.8	39.5	N/A
Diego Hypolito	Gusttavo Lima	"Balada"	10	9.7	10	9.7	39.4	N/A
Mariana Rios	Lady Gaga	"Poker Face"	10	9.8	10	9.9	39.7	N/A

=== Week 4 ===
Group A – Round 2

- Guest judge: Juliana Paes

Celebrity	Performing as	Song	Scores				Week total	Final total
Celebrity	Performing as	Song	Juliana	Boninho	Preta	Studio	Week total	Final total
Fiuk	Raul Seixas	"Metamorfose Ambulante"	10	9.8	9.9	9.8	39.5	79.1
Margareth Menezes	Kaoma	"Dançando Lambada"	10	9.8	10	9.9	39.7	79.2
Gloria Groove	Fergie	"Fergalicious"	10	9.9	10	9.9	39.8	79.4

=== Week 5 ===
Group B – Round 2

Celebrity	Performing as	Song	Scores				Week total	Final total
Celebrity	Performing as	Song	Claudia	Boninho	Preta	Studio	Week total	Final total
Thiago Arancam	Elvis Presley	"Can't Help Falling in Love"	9.8	9.8	9.9	9.8	39.3	78.8
Wanessa Camargo	Madonna	"Express Yourself"	10	10	10	9.9	39.9	79.7
Vitor Kley	Chiclete com Banana	"100% Você" / "Quero Chiclete"	10	9.8	10	10	39.8	79.5

=== Week 6 ===
Group C – Round 2

Celebrity	Performing as	Song	Scores				Week total	Final total
Celebrity	Performing as	Song	Claudia	Boninho	Preta	Studio	Week total	Final total
Diego Hypólito	José Augusto	"Aguenta Coração"	9.7	9.8	9.8	9.8	39.1	78.5
Robson Nunes	Carlinhos Brown	"A Namorada"	9.9	9.9	10	9.9	39.7	79.2
Mariana Rios	Bee Gees	"Stayin' Alive"	9.9	9.8	10	9.9	39.6	79.3

=== Week 7 ===
Group A – Round 3

Celebrity	Performing as	Song	Scores				Week total	Final total
Celebrity	Performing as	Song	Claudia	Boninho	Preta	Studio	Week total	Final total
Gloria Groove	Ana Carolina	"Encostar Na Tua"	10	9.9	10	9.9	39.8	119.2
Fiuk	Harry Styles	"Watermelon Sugar"	9.9	9.9	9.9	9.8	39.5	118.6
Margareth Menezes	Tina Turner	"Proud Mary"	10	10	10	9.9	39.9	119.1

=== Week 8 ===
Group B – Round 3

Celebrity	Performing as	Song	Scores				Week total	Final total
Celebrity	Performing as	Song	Claudia	Boninho	Preta	Studio	Week total	Final total
Thiago Arancam	Cauby Peixoto	"Conceição"	9.9	9.9	9.9	9.9	39.6	118.4
Vitor Kley	Justin Bieber	"Sorry"	10	9.9	10	9.9	39.8	119.3
Wanessa Camargo	Perla	"Galopera"	10	9.9	10	10	39.9	119.6

=== Week 9 ===
Group C – Round 3

Celebrity	Performing as	Song	Scores				Week total	Final total
Celebrity	Performing as	Song	Claudia	Boninho	Preta	Studio	Week total	Final total
Diego Hypólito	Jota Quest	"Dias Melhores" / "Do Seu Lado"	9.8	9.9	9.9	9.9	39.5	118.0
Robson Nunes	Tracy Chapman	"Baby Can I Hold You"	9.9	9.8	10	9.9	39.6	118.8
Mariana Rios	Elba Ramalho	"De Volta Pro Aconchego"	10	9.9	10	10	39.9	119.2

=== Week 10 ===
Group B – Elimination

Celebrity	Performing as	Song	Scores				Week total	Final total
Celebrity	Performing as	Song	Claudia	Boninho	Preta	Studio	Week total	Final total
Vitor Kley	Cazuza	"Exagerado" / Brasil"	10	10	10	10	40.0	159.3
Thiago Arancam	Andrea Bocelli	"Con te partirò"	9.9	9.9	9.9	9.9	39.6	158.4
Wanessa Camargo	ABBA	"The Winner Takes It All"	10	9.9	10	10	39.9	159.5

=== Week 11 ===
Group A – Elimination

Celebrity	Performing as	Song	Scores				Week total	Final total
Celebrity	Performing as	Song	Claudia	Boninho	Preta	Studio	Week total	Final total
Margareth Menezes	Sandra de Sá	"Olhos Coloridos"	10	9.9	9.9	10	39.8	158.9
Fiuk	Renato Russo	"Será"	10	10	10	10	40.0	158.6
Gloria Groove	Justin Timberlake	"SexyBack" / "My Love"	10	10	10	10	40.0	159.2

=== Week 12 ===
Group C – Elimination

Celebrity	Performing as	Song	Scores				Week total	Final total
Celebrity	Performing as	Song	Claudia	Boninho	Preta	Studio	Week total	Final total
Mariana Rios	Katy Perry	"Hot n Cold"	10	9.9	10	9.9	39.8	159.0
Diego Hypólito	Benito di Paula	"Retalhos de Cetim"	9.8	9.9	9.9	9.8	39.4	157.4
Robson Nunes	Mano Brown	"Jesus Chorou"	10	10	10	10	40.0	158.8

=== Week 13 ===
Semifinals – Round 1

Celebrity	Performing as	Song	Scores				Week total	Final total
Celebrity	Performing as	Song	Claudia	Boninho	Preta	Studio	Week total	Final total
Robson Nunes	Tim Maia	"Gostava Tanto de Você" / "Vale Tudo"	10	9.9	9.9	9.9	39.7	N/A
Gloria Groove	Luis Miguel	"La Barca"	10	10	10	10	40.0	N/A
Mariana Rios	Alanis Morissette	"You Oughta Know"	10	9.9	9.9	9.8	39.6	N/A

=== Week 14 ===
Semifinals – Round 2

Celebrity	Performing as	Song	Scores				Week total	Final total
Celebrity	Performing as	Song	Claudia	Boninho	Preta	Studio	Week total	Final total
Vitor Kley	Phil Collins	"You'll Be in My Heart"	9.9	9.9	9.9	9.9	39.6	N/A
Margareth Menezes	Roberta Miranda	"A Majestade, o Sabiá"	9.8	9.8	9.8	9.9	39.3	N/A
Wanessa Camargo	Evanescence	"Bring Me to Life"	10	10	10	10	40.0	N/A

=== Week 15 ===
Semifinals – Elimination

Celebrity	Performing as	Song	Scores				Week total	Final total
Celebrity	Performing as	Song	Claudia	Boninho	Preta	Studio	Week total	Final total
Margareth Menezes	James Brown	"I Got You (I Feel Good)"	9.9	9.9	9.9	9.8	39.5	78.8
Mariana Rios	Sia	"Chandelier"	9.9	9.9	9.9	9.9	39.6	79.2
Vitor Kley	Maroon 5	"Moves Like Jagger"	10	10	10	9.9	39.9	79.5
Robson Nunes	Chubby Checker	"Let's Twist Again"	9.9	9.9	9.9	9.9	39.6	79.3
Wanessa Camargo	Christina Aguilera	"Beautiful"	10	9.9	10	9.9	39.8	79.8
Gloria Groove	Marília Mendonça	"Bebi Liguei"	10	9.9	10	10	39.9	79.9

=== Week 16 ===
Finals

Celebrity	Performing as	Song	Votes to win				Final total	Result
Celebrity	Performing as	Song	Claudia	Boninho	Preta	Studio	Final total	Result
Vitor Kley	Adele	"Set Fire to the Rain"		✔			1	Runner-up
Wanessa Camargo	Britney Spears	"I'm a Slave 4 U"			✔		1	Runner-up
Robson Nunes	Wilson Simonal	"Nem Vem Que não Tem" / "País Tropical"					0	Fourth place
Gloria Groove	Jennifer Lopez	"Jenny from the Block" / "On the Floor"	✔			✔	2	Winner
