= A Queen Is Born =

- Genre: Reality-TV
- Country of origin: Brazil
- Original language: Portuguese
- No. of seasons: 1
- No. of episodes: 6

Production
- Running time: 42–44 minutes

Original release
- Network: Netflix
- Release: 11 November 2020

A Queen Is Born is a 2020 Brazilian television series. The premise revolves around aspiring drag queens and drag kings.

== Cast ==
- Phillip Jordan as Adla Davis
- Gloria Groove
- Alexia Twister
- Silvero Pereira as Gisele Almodóvar
