= 1996 Madrid Taxi Aéreo Learjet 25 crash =

1996 aviation accident in Brazil

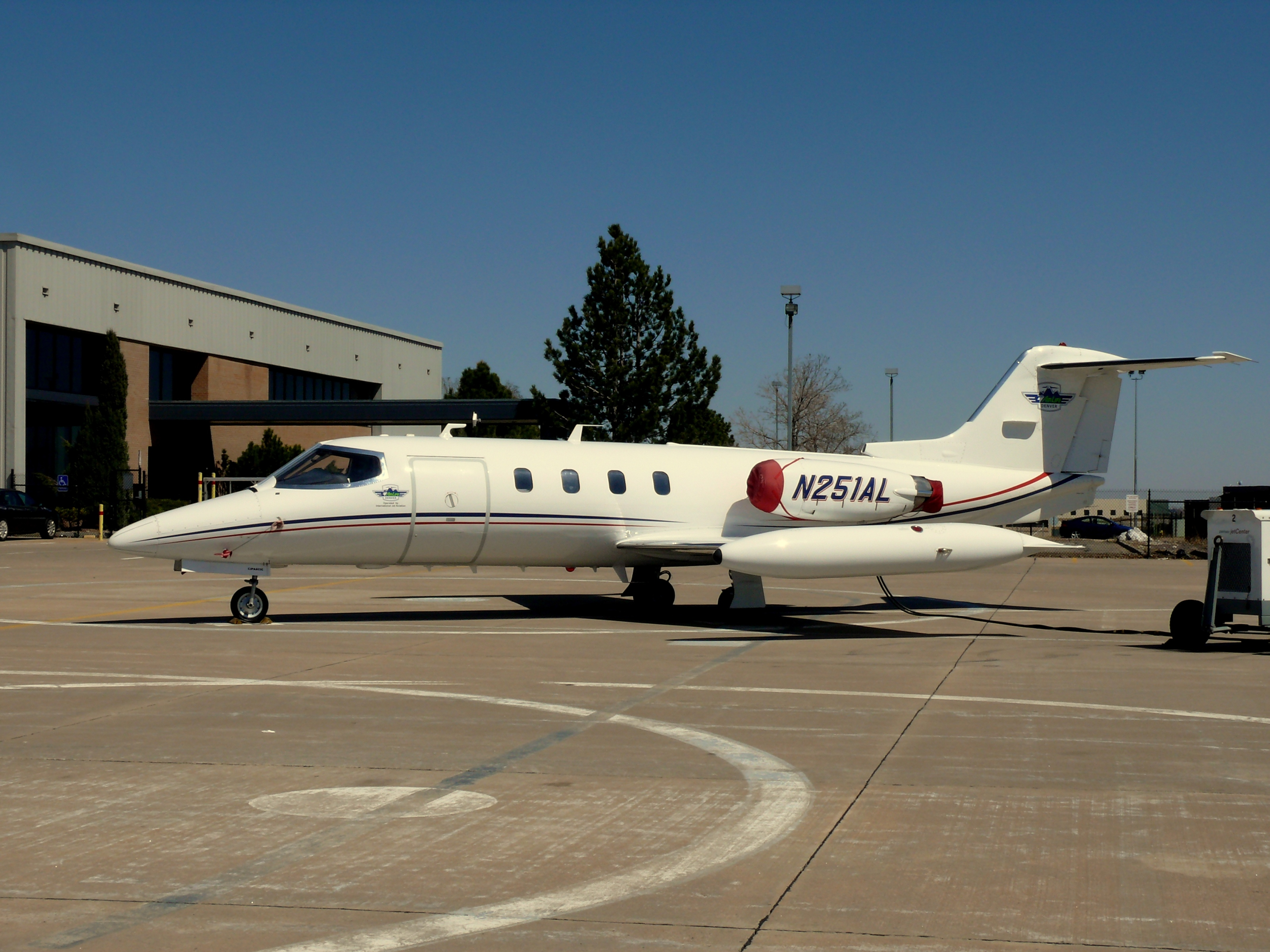
- A Learjet 25D similar to the accident aircraft

Accident
- Date: 2 March 1996
- Summary: Controlled flight into terrain due to multiple contributing factors
- Site: Serra da Cantareira, São Paulo, Brazil; 23°25′4.34″S 46°35′53.48″W

Aircraft
- Aircraft type: Learjet 25D
- Operator: Madrid Táxi Aéreo Ltda
- Call sign: LIMA SIERRA DELTA
- Registration: PT-LSD
- Flight origin: Brasília International Airport, Brasília, Brazil
- 1st stopover: São Paulo/Guarulhos International Airport, Guarulhos, Brazil
- Last stopover: Piracicaba Airport, Piracicaba, Brazil
- Destination: Campo dos Bugres Airport, Caxias do Sul, Brazil
- Occupants: 9
- Passengers: 7
- Crew: 2
- Fatalities: 9
- Survivors: 0

The 1996 Madrid Taxi Aéreo Learjet 25 crash occurred on 2 March 1996, originating from Brasília International Airport in Brasília, Federal District, with the destination of São Paulo/Guarulhos International Airport in Guarulhos, São Paulo. The aircraft collided with the Serra da Cantareira, resulting in the loss of all nine lives on board, including two crew members and seven passengers. Among the victims were all members of the comedic rock band Mamonas Assassinas, causing a tragedy that garnered significant national attention in Brazil. There were no survivors.

The aircraft involved was a Learjet 25D owned by Madrid Táxi Aéreo, a air taxi service based in Ribeirão Preto. The aircraft was compliant with all mandatory inspections and documentation, authorized to operate as intended.

The accident was classified by the Aeronautical Accidents Investigation and Prevention Center (CENIPA) as a controlled flight into terrain. Contributing factors identified by CENIPA included crew fatigue from an extended work period without rest, the pilot's authoritarian demeanor contrasted with the copilot's passivity, miscommunication between the aircraft and ground control due to improper phraseology, the crew's unfamiliarity with the destination airport's aeronautical charts, and environmental factors such as the low population density of the Serra da Cantareira, which reduced visibility, particularly at night.

The remote location of the crash site delayed rescue efforts, which were only fully executed the following morning. Upon arrival, all occupants were confirmed deceased. The tragedy sparked widespread public mourning, with approximately 100,000 people attending the funeral procession for the band members.

== Background ==
=== Operator ===
The operator was Madrid Táxi Aéreo Ltda, an air taxi company. At the time of the incident, the company held an active and operational air registry. Based in Ribeirão Preto, it had been in operation for one year. The owner, Antônio Nunes Leme Galvão, was not indicted, as the investigation concluded that pilot Jorge Luiz Martins was qualified to operate the Learjet 25D, absolving the owner of responsibility.

=== Aircraft ===
The aircraft was a Learjet 25D, registered under the tail number PT-LSD, manufactured by Learjet in 1978. At the time of the flight, it had accumulated 6,123 flight hours, a typical amount for this aircraft type. All mandatory inspections were up to date, with the annual inspection conducted by Líder Táxi Aéreo and the most recent six-month inspection by Transamérica Táxi Aéreo, both authorized companies. The aircraft had a capacity for eight passengers and required a minimum of two crew members, with a maximum human load of ten.

=== Premonition ===
External videos
- News segment showing video where Júlio discusses his premonition with his hairdresser

On the day of the accident, before takeoff, Mamonas Assassinas keyboardist Júlio Rasec, experienced a premonition through a dream. He shared this with his hairdresser hours before boarding, recorded on video by the hairdresser who regularly documented Júlio's visits. In a unusually serious and concerned tone, Júlio scratched the back of his head and commented:

"Eu não sei, essa noite eu sonhei com um negócio assim... Parecia que o avião caia. Eu não sei. Eu não sei o que isso significa." - "I don't know, last night I dreamed of something... It felt like the plane was crashing. I don't know. I don't know what it means".

== Flight ==
The flight was operated by Madrid Táxi Aéreo across multiple legs, covering various regions of Brazil. The passengers and crew remained consistent throughout all flights, starting on 1 March 1996. The accident occurred the following day, 2 March. During this 24-hour period, three flights were completed:

Flight path map (The icon "" indicates an airport, and the icon "" indicates the crash site, while the lines represent specific flights)
Interactive Map	Flight	Description
	1st	The first flight occurred on 1 March 1996, from Campo dos Bugres Airport in Caxias do Sul (RS) to Piracicaba Airport in Piracicaba (SP). The flight proceeded without issues, and the crew rested overnight.
	2nd	The second flight occurred on 2 March, at 07:10 BRT (10:10 UTC) from Piracicaba Airport in Piracicaba to São Paulo/Guarulhos International Airport in Guarulhos. The flight proceeded without issues, and the crew planned the third flight upon arrival.
	3rd	The third flight occurred later in the afternoon at 15:00 BRT (18:00 UTC) from São Paulo/Guarulhos International Airport to Brasília International Airport in Brasília (DF). The flight proceeded without issues, except for a brief, unspecified takeoff delay.
	4th	The fourth flight occurred later that night at 21:58 BRT (00:58 UTC) on a return flight from Brasília International Airport to São Paulo/Guarulhos International Airport in Guarulhos. The flight never reached its destination, crashing into the Serra da Cantareira before landing.

=== Crew and passengers ===
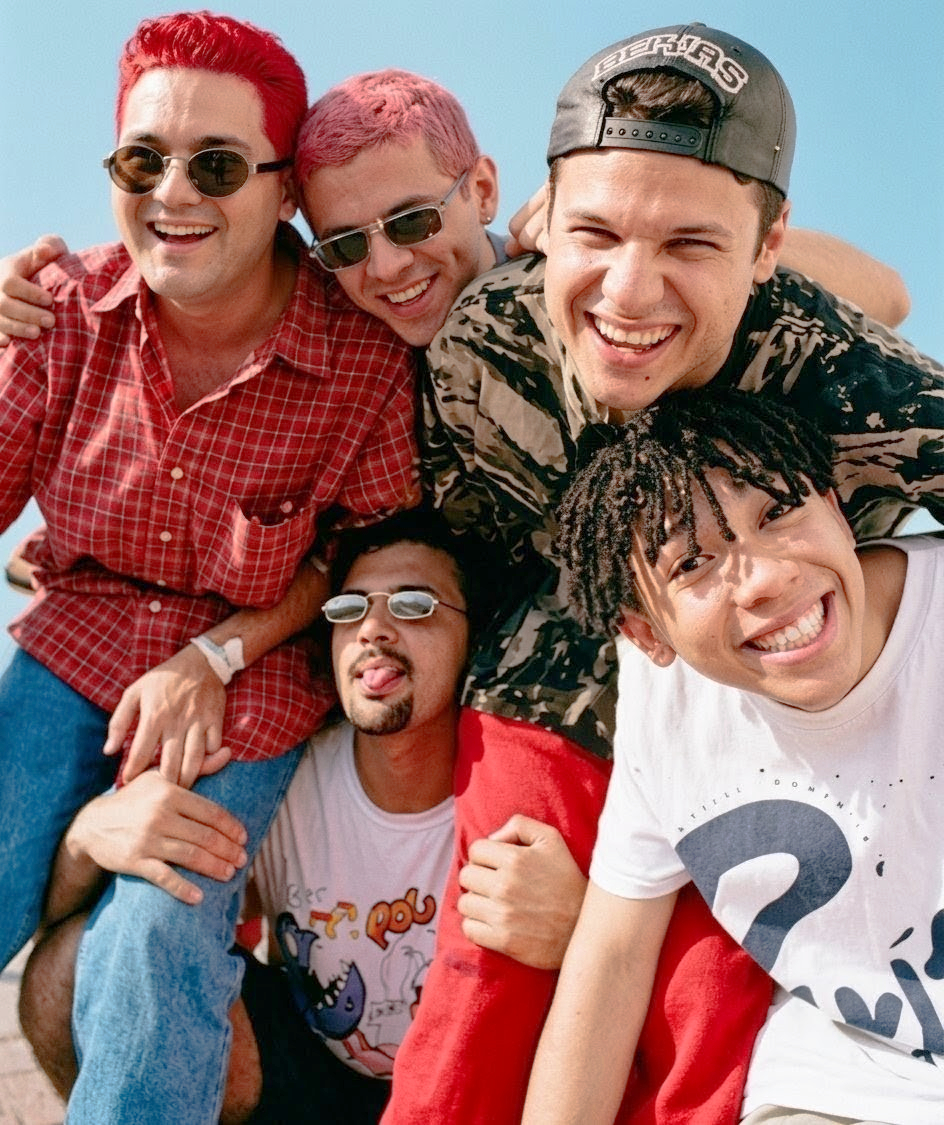
All the members of Mamonas Assassinas died in the accident

The flight maintained the same crew and passengers throughout all legs, transporting the following individuals:

- Jorge Luiz Germano Martins, aged 30, an experienced pilot with 2,500 flight hours, including 170 on Learjet aircraft;
- Alberto Yoshiumi Takeda, aged 24, a copilot certified for this aircraft type but with limited experience;
- Alecsander "Dinho" Alves Leite, aged 24, vocalist and songwriter for Mamonas Assassinas;
- Alberto "Bento" Hinoto, aged 25, guitarist for the band;
- Júlio "Julio Rasec" César Barbosa, aged 28, keyboardist for the band;
- Samuel "Samuel Reoli" Reis de Oliveira, aged 22, bassist for the band;
- Sérgio "Sérgio Reoli" Reis de Oliveira, aged 26, drummer for the band;
- Isaac "Shurelambers" Ramos Souto, aged 28, band secretary and assistant, and the vocalist's cousin;
- Sérgio "Reco" Saturnino Porto, aged 29, band security guard.

== Accident ==
=== Takeoff and cruise ===
The flight departed from Brasília International Airport (BSB) on 2 March 1996, at 21:58 BRT (00:58 UTC) after Mamonas Assassinas concluded their show at Estádio Nacional Mané Garrincha and were returning home to their hometown of Guarulhos to be with their families. They were scheduled to leave for Portugal the next day to start their first international tour. On board, there were two crew members and seven passengers including the aforementioned band themselves, with a full fuel, and some band luggage, which did not significantly affect the aircraft's aerodynamics.

Most of the flight proceeded smoothly, with reasonably favorable weather conditions until the approach to Guarulhos. At that point, the ceiling was 1,800 feet (548.64 meters), with a visibility of ten kilometers, complicating the runway approach. The Serra da Cantareira's low population density and minimal lighting further hindered a nighttime approach.

=== Approach and go-around ===
General layout of Guarulhos Airport

The complex approach to Guarulhos was guided entirely by the ground control team at São Paulo/Guarulhos International Airport (GRU). The "Charlie 2" procedure, an instrument landing, was implemented when visual landing was deemed unsafe. Instrument landings are standard in such conditions. Both the Guarulhos tower operator and pilot Martins were certified by the Civil Aviation Authority for this operation.

During the approach, Martins requested permission to maintain speed, which was granted. This unusual request suggested haste, possibly due to fatigue. However, maintaining high speed destabilized the landing process.

Recognizing the landing difficulties and high speed, Martins opted for a go-around. Go-arounds are standard, often executed to the left to avoid collisions. At Guarulhos, however, the approach chart mandated a right turn toward Bonsucesso to avoid mountainous terrain, which the pilot did not follow, turning left instead.

=== Impact ===
During the go-around, a miscommunication occurred between Martins and Guarulhos tower. Copilot Takeda requested a left turn, which was approved, with the tower assuming a 270-degree left turn toward the south sector (right side of the runway). Instead, the aircraft continued north (left side). Due to high speed, its turn radius was larger than expected, bringing it back toward the Serra da Cantareira.

The regional flight control at São Paulo–Congonhas Airport (CGH) noticed via radar that the aircraft failed to land. Concerned about potential collisions with two approaching commercial planes, they transferred control from Guarulhos to Congonhas. This was promptly executed.

At this point, the Congonhas controller requested flight status updates. Martins responded that he was ready for a visual re-approach. Preparing to return, he was instructed to proceed and wait for the other planes to land. The controller mistakenly believed the Learjet had turned right toward Bonsucesso, not toward the Serra da Cantareira.

At a significantly low altitude and heading toward the Serra da Cantareira, the aircraft collided with a hill at 23:16 BRT (02:16 UTC), at 3,300 feet (1,006 meters), just 8⅓ miles northwest of Guarulhos International Airport. Shortly after the Learjet disappeared from radar, the Congonhas controller sought updates but received no response, as the aircraft had just crashed.

=== Rescue ===
External videos
- Reports from Rede Globo about the plane crash
- News segment showing the plane crash and rescue

After the Congonhas controller sensed an issue, they requested Varig Flight 854, which was departing to New York City, trying to contact the Learjet PT-LSD, hoping the communication error was between Congonhas and the aircraft. When Varig Flight 854 received no response, the controller alerted local authorities to the emergency.

The Varig pilot reported observing a dense, dark smoke cloud in the Serra da Cantareira during their approach, heightening concerns. Hours after the crash, firefighters reached the difficult-to-access site that the search and rescue operations did not begin until the following morning, which was 3 March. At the crash site, eight of the nine bodies were found by the Military Firefighters Corps after a 1½ mile hike and pulled out one by one from the wreckage, and hoisted to a Military Police helicopter, the ninth and final body identified as the band's vocalist, Dinho, confirming all occupants were deceased as a result of blunt trauma, and were later sent to Legal Medical Institute (Instituto Médico Legal, IML) for forensic analysis, where unexpected growing number of fans stood outside the IML office in São Paulo. It was the first fatal plane crash in Brazil since Varig Flight 254 in 1989 and as well as the first fatal crash in the state of São Paulo since Transbrasil Flight 801 also in that year.

== Investigation ==
The investigation was conducted by the National Civil Aviation Agency of Brazil and the Aeronautical Accidents Investigation and Prevention Center. It considered the flight plan, recorded communications between controllers and pilots Martins and Takeda, and maintenance reports provided by the operator. After months, CENIPA issued a conclusive report on 28 May 1996, determining the crash resulted from a controlled flight into terrain due to multiple factors.

Initial investigations reviewed the pilots' aviation history. Martins was being an experienced pilot, had a prior incident in 1991 due to inattention. Flying a King Air to Rondonópolis, he forgot to lower the landing gear, resulting in a ground collision. No fatalities occurred, but the aircraft was damaged. The copilot's limited experience led to a passive demeanor, offering little assistance. Cristiane de Paula Perreira Martins, the widow of pilot Martins, stating the crash was primarily due to priority given to Boeings and that her husband was "a very sensible and meticulous person."

Madrid Táxi Aéreo was also investigated. The aircraft's documentation and pilot qualifications were in order, though the copilot lacked experience. The aircraft's insurance had lapsed eight months prior due to non-payment, suggesting financial issues. Inspections were current, though media noted the annual inspection frequency was minimal. The company lacked a dedicated flight safety team and did not participate in relevant organizations or unions, which was recommended but not mandatory.

=== Contributing factors ===
CENIPA identified factors in four categories: physiological, psychological, operational, and external. Physiological factors included crew exhaustion from a 36-hour work period without adequate rest, leading to haste and inattention.

Psychological factors noted the pilot's persistent temperament and overconfidence, exacerbated by fatigue, and the copilot's reticence, likely worsened by the pilot's demeanor.

Operational factors included five key issues: inadequate crew training leading to errors in critical moments; the copilot's inexperience and poor phraseology; lack of a dedicated flight safety team; improper aircraft configuration for approach and landing; and planning failures during descent and post-go-around visual flight.

While in the traffic pattern, PT-LSD descended from 4,400 to 3,100 feet. The ALTITUDE ALERT was set to 4,000 feet, indicating the crew believed it was functional. Their failure to respond to the alert could indicate equipment failure or, more likely, inattention.

Environmental factors included the Serra da Cantareira's low visibility due to sparse population and minimal lighting on a dark, cloudy night. An external factor was the possible presence of a passenger in the cockpit, potentially distracting the crew during critical moments.

=== Release of recorded dialogue ===
In 2014, the final flight communications were publicly released via a television program. The audio revealed communication deficiencies, with the controller failing to clearly convey information. Five minutes after initial contact, 40 kilometers from the runway, the Guarulhos controller asked the copilot for their position, receiving a response of 180 degrees when it was 170 degrees.

Attempting to correct the route with the copilot's erroneous data, the controller ordered a 10-degree increase. When asked about airspeed, the copilot reported 400 km/h, inconsistent with investigation findings, possibly due to equipment failure. The copilot then reported the potential error, stating uncertainty about the aircraft's and wind's speed.

After the miscommunication, another controller took over. Upon hearing the crew's intent to turn left, the controller did not correct the instruction but ordered a right turn to follow the traffic pattern, contributing to the accident due to unreliable flight data.

== Aftermath ==
=== Media coverage and public mourning ===
Following confirmation of the crash, Brazilian newspapers widely reported the event. Search and recovery efforts were photographed and televised, including body removal, which some media outlets inappropriately publicized, compromising privacy.

Several television stations just started signing-on morning broadcasts including Rede Globo and SBT, adjusted their schedules to focus on the crash, paying tribute to the artists and covering the wake and funeral procession. Some afternoon shows like Rede Globo's Domingão do Faustão also paid tributes for the artist due to continuous coverage and SBT's Domingo Legal remembered the highlights on their previous appearances on that show. Some media speculated on causes before CENIPA's official report, intensifying coverage.

The tragedy resonated internationally, eliciting grief and solidarity. Portuguese newspapers mourned the band, which Mamonas Assassinas were preparing to leave for Lisbon, Portugal.

In mourning, some schools in Guarulhos and nearby areas suspended classes due to widespread grief and student absences for tributes. The band's wake occurred on 4 March, at the Paschoal Thomeu Municipal Gymnasium in Guarulhos, with around 30,000 people waiting before the bodies arrived. Approximately 65,000 attended the wake.

The funeral procession took place on 5 March, which would have been Dinho's 25th birthday, drew over 100,000 attendees, marked the largest funeral procession in the state of São Paulo since the death of Ayrton Senna a little two years earlier. At the Parque das Primaveras Cemetery, about 500 friends and family attended the burial. The band's family members requested a private ceremony, and the Military Police prevented fan intrusions, causing minor crowd disturbances. Approximately 31 people fainted during the chaotic scene.

=== Aviation consequences ===
Based on the incident, CENIPA issued recommendations to involved parties and similar air taxi companies to prevent future accidents due to similar factors.

Air taxi and civil aviation companies were advised to: plan flights considering crew physical limitations and proper work hygiene; implement practical training programs to ensure high operational and safety standards; develop accident prevention programs; employ CENIPA-accredited flight safety agents; adhere to aeronautical regulations for safety and operational efficiency; and ensure mandatory passenger briefings on emergency procedures and risks of interfering with crew operations.

The São Paulo Regional Civil Aviation Service was recommended to conduct safety inspections at Madrid Táxi Aéreo and extend this to similar companies. The Directorate of Electronics and Flight Protection was advised to revise standard phraseology, creating a bilingual (Portuguese and English) manual for clearer air traffic communication.

The Civil Aviation Department received five recommendations: enforce mandatory crew rest periods; expand technical flight safety training with CENIPA; extend cockpit voice and flight data recorder requirements to aircraft carrying six or more passengers; mandate earlier installation of cockpit voice recorders and ground proximity warning systems for such aircraft; and include crew resource management training.

== See also ==
- TAM Transportes Aéreos Regionais Flight 402
- 2021 Piedade de Caratinga Beechcraft King Air crash, another private airplane crash involving another Brazilian artist, Marília Mendonça
