= Lendas urbanas =

- Also known as: Histórias que o Povo Conta
- Presented by: Gugu Liberato Celso Portiolli
- Narrated by: Gugu Liberato Xaropinho

Original release
- Network: Record TV
- Release: 1993 – 2009
- Network: SBT
- Release: 1993 – 2009

Lendas urbanas is a segment from the Brazilian television program Domingo Legal, which aired starting in 2009 on the SBT network and was initially hosted by Gugu Liberato. The segment featured horror stories recounted by people interviewed for the show as well as folktales.

== Origin ==
The program aired from 1993 to 2009, initially hosted by Gugu Liberato and later by Celso Portiolli alongside the character Xaropinho. Many of the episodes were based on popular Brazilian folktales.

== Reception ==
The program returned to the air as part of Programa do Ratinho, but under the title Histórias que o povo conta ("Stories that People Tell"), with the announcer Sombra serving as host.
