= Serra da Cantareira =

Mountain range in Brazil

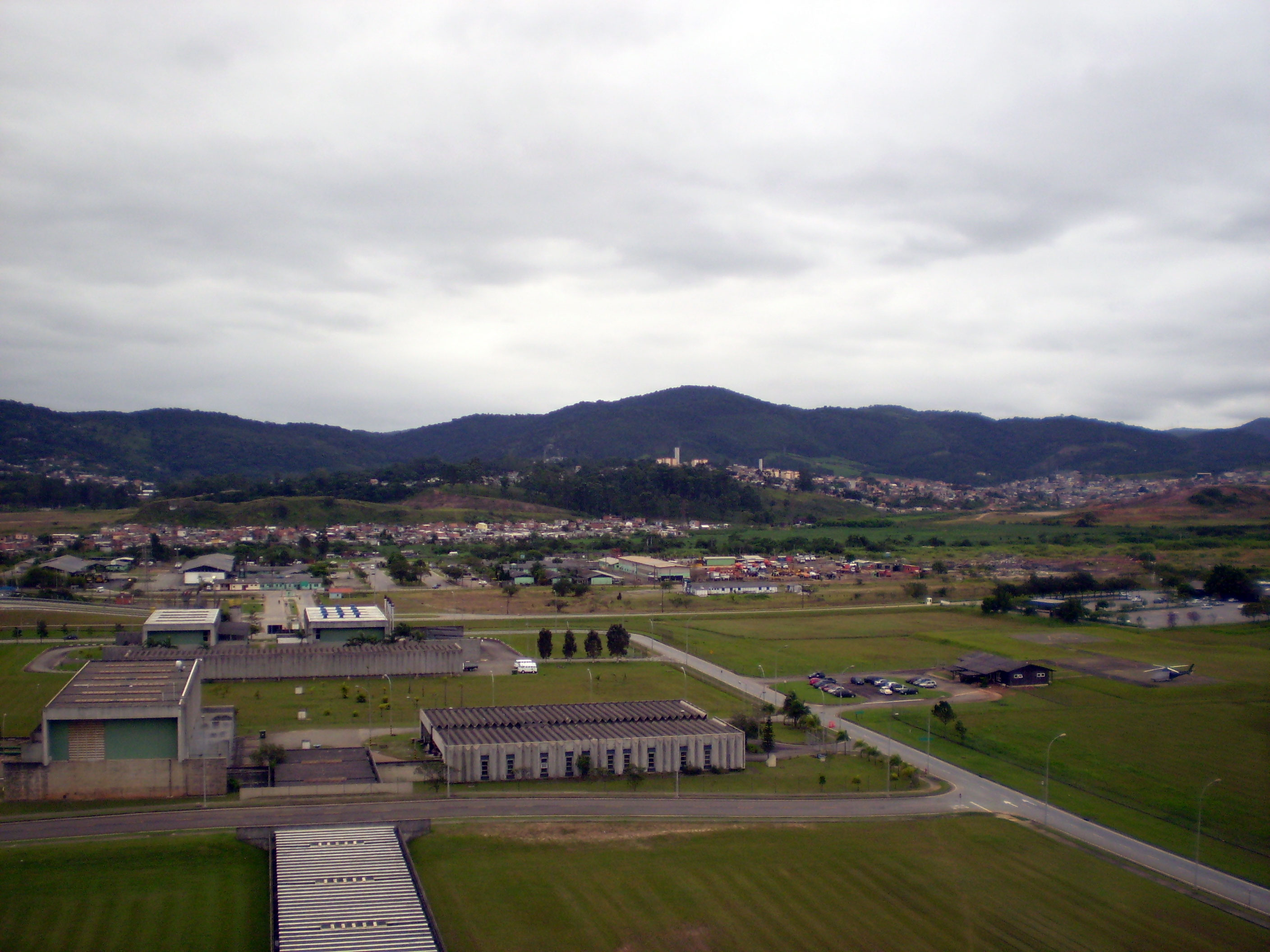
- The range as seen from the São Paulo-Guarulhos International Airport control tower

Highest point
- Peak: Pico do Jaraguá
- Elevation: 1,135 m (3,724 ft)
- Coordinates: 23°27′30″S 46°45′55″W

Geography
- Country: Brazil
- Borders on: Serra da Cantareira

The Serra da Cantareira is a Brazilian mountain range to the north of the city of São Paulo in the São Paulo state. The area has many walking trails and is popular among locals. The Pico do Jaraguá, São Paulo's highest point, is located there. It was here where the famous Brazilian band Mamonas Assassinas died in a plane crash.
