= Dinho (São Toméan footballer) =

São Toméan footballer

Personal information
- Full name: Eduardo Assunção Varela
- Date of birth: 16 July 2000 (age 26)
- Positions: Midfielder; defender

Team information
- Current team: Porto Real

Senior career*
Years	Team	Apps	(Gls)
2017–2018	UDRA		
2019	Cano Sport		
2019–	Porto Real		

International career^{‡}
2018	São Tomé and Príncipe U23		
2017–	São Tomé and Príncipe	3	(0)
- * Club domestic league appearances and goals ‡ National team caps and goals as of 3 April 2020

Eduardo Assunção Varela (born 16 July 2000), commonly known as Dinho or Pogba, is a São Toméan footballer who plays as a midfielder for FC Porto Real and the São Tomé and Príncipe national team.

== Club career ==
On 13 January 2019, Dinho joined Equatorial Guinean Liga Nacional de Fútbol club Cano Sport Academy.

== International career ==
Dinho made his international debut for São Tomé and Príncipe in 2017.
