= Dinho (singer) =

Brazilian musician and comedian (1971–1996)

Background information
- Born: Alecsander Alves (Note: The singer's birth certificate and the Vehicle Registration and Licensing Certificate for the Brasília he acquired indicate that his full name was only Alecsander Alves, however, other sources indicate that the surname Leite, which appears in his father's name, Hildebrando Alves Leite, was also part of it.); 5 March 1971; Irecê, Bahia, Brazil
- Died: 2 March 1996 (aged 24) Serra da Cantareira, São Paulo, Brazil
- Cause of death: Plane crash
- Genres: Hard rock; Comedy rock
- Occupations: Singer; songwriter; comedian
- Instruments: Vocals; guitar
- Years active: 1989–1996
- Formerly of: Mamonas Assassinas

Alecsander Alves (March 5, 1971 – March 2, 1996), better known as Dinho (Brazilian Portuguese: [ˈdʒĩɲu]), was a Brazilian singer, songwriter, and comedian who was the lead singer of Mamonas Assassinas, a rock band.

Born in Bahia and raised in Guarulhos, São Paulo, Dinho began vocal training at age five under his instructor Donizete Severo. In July 1990, he joined the rock band Utopia, in Guarulhos, while working in an office and pursuing comedy. The band had difficulty finding commercial success, however, upon rebranding as a comedy band called Mamonas Assassinas in 1995, the band gained widespread public attention within weeks, performing in concerts across Brazil and making frequent media appearances. On March 2, 1996, the band members were flying aboard a plane in Serra da Cantareira when it crashed, with all members losing their lives.

== Early life ==
Dinho was born in Irecê, Bahia. When he was just two months old he moved with his parents, Hildebrando Alves Leite and Celia Ramos Alves, to Guarulhos, São Paulo, where the family sought a better opportunities. His nickname, “Dinho,” was given by his maternal grandmother, Carmen Ramos, of Spanish origin, who couldn't pronounce Alecsander and nicknamed him Dinho instead.

He started singing as a child, and by the age of five was the main performer in the children's choir at his local church. While growing up, he had his first singing lessons from Donizete Severo. After Severo died in an accident at the factory she worked in 1992, Dinho stopped attending the worship service.

== Career ==
=== 1990–1995: Utopia and commercial failure ===
In July 1990, Dinho was attending a gig by the band Utopia, consisting of Sergio Reoli, Samuel Reoli and Bento Hinoto at Parque Cecap in Guarulhos, when he joined them on stage to sing “Sweet Child o' Mine” by Guns N' Roses. His performance impressed Utopia's members, leading them to invite him to be their new lead singer. The band would later include Marcio Araujo (keyboardist) and Julio Rasec (then percussionist, later keyboardist) as members.

The band performed a few shows in Guarulhos, especially in Parque Cecap, but their serious songs never reached the success they hoped for. The failure become clearer in 1992 when the band's LP sold less than a hundred copies. Dinho petitioned Guarulhos City Hall to secure a performance slot at the Paschoal Thomeu Gymnasium's inaugural ceremony. The request was denied.

Dinho worked as an office boy and an entertainer at political rallies, especially for councillor Geraldo Celestino, doing comic imitations of celebrities such as Maguila, Silvio Santos and Luiz Inácio Lula da Silva. In mid-1992, he began to work as a presenter of a musical programme called Saturday Show, on RecordTV. The show was led by his former father-in-law Saverio Zacanini, who was responsible for giving Dinho and Utopia their first opportunities to perform on TV.

=== 1995–1996: Mamonas Assassinas and success ===
As time progressed, Dinho realized that his comical side and joke songs were more popular than Utopia's more mature tracks. After an unpretentious recording of Mina (later rewritten and renamed Pelados em Santos) and Robocop Gay, producer Rick Bonadio convinced the group to switch to satirical music. In 1995 the band did so, and renamed as Mamonas Assassinas.

With the instant, unexpected and overwhelming success of the Mamonas Assassinas, Dinho went from a complete unknown to the front man of a popular band, becoming one of the country's most sought-after celebrities. With his fame, he met some of his idols, such as Humberto Gessinger, Chitãozinho & Xororó, Roberto Leal and Morten Harket, lead singer of A-ha, with whom Dinho and the rest of the group shared the stage at a concert in the Toco Dance Club, playing A-ha's Take on Me.

On January 6, 1996, the Mamonas Assassinas returned to Guarulhos to perform a concert at the Paschoal Thomeu Gymnasium. Before playing, the five members of the band walked on stage without their usual costumes and performed as if they were Utopia, playing the songs Será by Legião Urbana, Bichos Escrotos by Titãs, and Horizonte Infinito, a song from the Utopia album. Dinho thanked the Mamonas Assassinas for the opportunity to make Utopia's dream of playing in the hall come true. At the end of the show, Dinho sat down on stage and spoke to the crowd:

"Five years ago I was there, among you, wanting to be here. And people looked at me and said: ‘It's impossible to get here' (...) We're the band Mamonas Assassinas, from Guarulhos, and we've taken the name of this city all over the country. And we're going to take the name of this city abroad too! Because we're still from here. Success doesn't get into people's heads. It only goes to the heads of those who are weak. And we're not weak people. If we were weak, we would have given up five years ago, when people said we would never get this far. But here we are! (...)"

== Personal life ==
Dinho dated Mirella Zacanini from 1992 to July 1995, a period that coincided with his transition from anonymous performer to emerging public figure. Zacanini later authored the memoir Pitchulinha: My Life with Dinho – Until Mamonas Do Us Apart. Zacanini would later write the song “Mil Momentos” (A Thousand Moments), dedicated to the singer.

He later had a relationship with Valeria Zoppello until his death in 1996. Zoppello became widely recognized following an appearance on the Sunday television program Domingo Legal, when Dinho invited her on stage to publicly introduce her as his girlfriend. The couple engaged in an extended, passionate kiss that resulted in them falling to the ground; Dinho continued the display with characteristic humor. This public moment occurred after a backstage disagreement regarding the show's traditional segments featuring women in bikinis, which Dinho found objectionable. In interviews, Zoppello stated that the couple planned to marry in 1996. Following Dinho's death, she became an important custodian of his legacy, frequently participating in commemorative events and media tributes celebrating the band's influence on Brazilian popular culture.

== Death ==
On March 2, 1996, at 9:58 p.m., Dinho and the other four musicians from Mamonas Assassinas, after a concert in Brasília, left in a Learjet 25D prefix PT-LSD heading to Guarulhos, São Paulo. The aircraft, close to its destination, made contact with the control tower after the pilot informed them that there were visual conditions to do so. The plane made a left turn, but the correct direction to reach the airport was to the right. At around 11:16pm, the plane crashed into the Cantareira mountain range, north of the city of São Paulo.

The limited access to the mountainous crash site resulted in delays in the rescue effort, which could only be carried out effectively the following morning. All occupants of the aircraft perished in the crash. The crash generated intense popular commotion, leading approximately 100,000 people to take part in the funeral procession in honor of the band members.

== Honors ==
On January 10, 1996, Dinho was honored with the title of "Emeritus Citizen of Dracena" in recognition of his mother's roots in the city and his contributions to Brazilian music and culture.

== Posthumous ==
In 2008, Dinho was portrayed by Fabrizio Teixeira in the special “Por Toda Minha Vida – Mamonas Assassinas” (For All My Life – Mamonas Assassinas), which competed for the Emmy of Best Arts Programming.

In 2016, he was portrayed by Ruy Brissac in the play “O Musical Mamonas” (The Mamonas Musical). Ruy portrayed him again in “Mamonas Assassinas – A Série” (Mamonas Assassinas – The TV Show), made in partnership with RecordTV, with a script by Carlos Lombardi and directed by Léo Miranda. He returned for the role in 2023 for the movie “Mamonas Assassinas – O Filme” (Mamonas Assassinas – The Movie).

Two streets named Alecsander Alves, Dinho's baptismal name, were created; one in Juiz de Fora and another in the Villa Barros neighborhood in Guarulhos. In 2019, a square was inaugurated in his hometown of Irecê, where the singer was immortalized with the installation of a full-body sculpture, an event attended by his parents, Hildebrando and Celia. The Irecê Symphony Orchestra and a Mamonas cover band, made up of local artists, performed at the ceremony.
