= Irecê =

Municipality of Bahia, Brazil

- Municipality and city
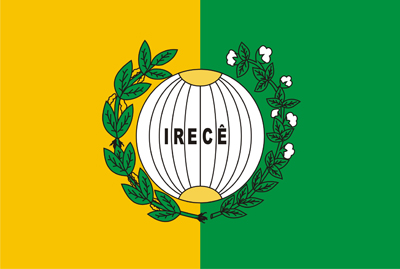
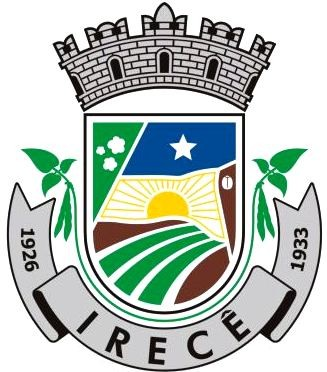
- Flag Coat of arms

- Location in Brazil
- Coordinates: 11°18′14″S 42°51′21″W
- Country: Brazil
- Region: Nordeste
- State: Bahia
- Mesoregion: Centro Norte Baiano

Area
  - Total: 121.118 sq mi (313.695 km^{2})

Population (2020)
  - Total: 73,524
- Time zone: UTC−3 (BRT)

Irecê is a municipality in Bahia, Brazil. As of 2020 it had a population of 73,524 people. 476 kilometres (296 mi) by road northwest of Salvador. Located in the northern region of Chapada Diamantina. It is an agricultural town known for growing black beans and being a wine-producing region.

== History ==
=== Indigenous Origins and Colonization ===
Until the 17th century, the interior of Bahia was inhabited by the Aimoré indigenous people, also known as Botocudos. During the Portuguese colonization, the territory that now corresponds to the municipality of Irecê was granted by the King of Portugal as a sesmaria (a land allotment) to Antônio Guedes de Brito.

=== From Carahybas to Irecê ===
For a long time, the local settlement was known as "Carahybas". In 1896, the famous Brazilian geographer and Tupi scholar Teodoro Sampaio suggested changing the name to Irecê. In the indigenous Tupi language, Irecê means "by the water", "floating on the surface of the water", or "at the mercy of the current".

=== Political Emancipation and Autonomy ===
The settlement was initially a district under the jurisdiction of Morro do Chapéu. On August 2, 1926, the municipality of Irecê was officially founded through Law No. 1,896, signed by the state governor Francisco Marques de Góes Calmon. At the time, it was named Vila de Irecê. However, due to a lack of sufficient local revenue to sustain itself independently, the municipality was dissolved and reincorporated into Morro do Chapéu on July 8, 1931. Its definitive political autonomy was restored two years later, on May 31, 1933, via Decree No. 8,452 signed by Juracy Magalhães, officially re-establishing the municipality.

=== Modern Era ===
Today, Irecê is located in the northern region of the Chapada Diamantina. It serves as a vital agricultural and commercial hub for the state of Bahia, historically recognized for its large-scale black bean cultivation and production.

== Climate ==
Irecê is classified as hot semi-arid climate (Köppen climate classification: BSh), the average temperature on summer is 30°C, on winter is warm, the temperature reaches to 16°C.

Climate data for Irecê (1981–2010)
Month	Jan	Feb	Mar	Apr	May	Jun	Jul	Aug	Sep	Oct	Nov	Dec	Year
Mean daily maximum °C (°F)	30.7 (87.3)	31.4 (88.5)	30.6 (87.1)	30.3 (86.5)	29.4 (84.9)	28.1 (82.6)	28.0 (82.4)	28.8 (83.8)	30.8 (87.4)	32.1 (89.8)	31.5 (88.7)	30.7 (87.3)	30.2 (86.4)
Daily mean °C (°F)	24.2 (75.6)	24.6 (76.3)	24.2 (75.6)	23.9 (75.0)	22.8 (73.0)	21.4 (70.5)	21.0 (69.8)	21.8 (71.2)	23.5 (74.3)	25.1 (77.2)	24.8 (76.6)	24.4 (75.9)	23.5 (74.3)
Mean daily minimum °C (°F)	18.7 (65.7)	18.8 (65.8)	18.9 (66.0)	18.3 (64.9)	17.1 (62.8)	15.8 (60.4)	14.9 (58.8)	15.4 (59.7)	16.6 (61.9)	18.2 (64.8)	18.8 (65.8)	19.0 (66.2)	17.5 (63.5)
Average precipitation mm (inches)	91.8 (3.61)	81.2 (3.20)	112.5 (4.43)	45.7 (1.80)	16.2 (0.64)	1.2 (0.05)	1.1 (0.04)	0.8 (0.03)	4.1 (0.16)	34.3 (1.35)	99.2 (3.91)	120.9 (4.76)	609.0 (23.98)
Average precipitation days (≥ 1.0 mm)	6	5	6	3	1	0	0	0	0	2	6	8	37
Average relative humidity (%)	63.6	61.1	65.6	65.1	63.5	64.3	61.4	57.0	52.3	49.4	58.4	63.3	60.4
Mean monthly sunshine hours	258.6	230.2	228.0	236.3	245.3	231.7	265.6	275.8	274.1	268.7	227.9	231.5	2,973.7
Source: Instituto Nacional de Meteorologia

== Notable landmarks ==
It is the home of the "Academia Ireceense de Letras e Artes." It was also the site the Universal Church of the Kingdom of God chose for an industrial kibbutz.

== See also ==
- List of municipalities in Bahia
