= Domingo Legal =

- Genre: Variety show
- Created by: Homero Salles; Gugu Liberato; Roberto Manzoni
- Directed by: Rubens Gargalaca Jr.
- Presented by: Gugu Liberato (1993–2009); Celso Portiolli (2009–present)
- Country of origin: Brazil
- Original language: Portuguese
- No. of episodes: 1,700

Production
- Production locations: CDT da Anhanguera, Osasco, São Paulo, Brazil
- Running time: 425 minutes

Original release
- Network: Rede Globo (1998–2012); SBT (1993–1998; 2012–present)
- Release: 17 January 1993 – present

Domingo Legal (lit. 'Cool Sunday') is a Brazilian variety show aired by SBT. It premiered on January 17, 1993, under the command of Gugu Liberato. It is currently hosted by Celso Portiolli, who is also the general manager, with direction by Rubens Gargalaca Jr. The program consists primarily of a sequence of game shows, most notably Passa ou Repassa, which is based on the American show Double Dare.

== History ==
=== Gugu Liberato Era (1993–2009) ===
Hosted by Gugu Liberato, Domingo Legal began broadcasting on January 17, 1993. Initially, during its first year, the show was pre-recorded before airing, but starting on August 7, 1994, it began airing live. From 1994 to 1997, it aired from 12 PM to 4 PM. On October 19, 1997, Domingo Legal changed its schedule to 3 PM to 8 PM, putting it in direct competition with Domingão do Faustão. From its start in 1993 until 1997, it was recorded (or transmitted) from the Teatro Silvio Santos in Carandiru, in the northern zone of São Paulo. On February 1, 1998, the program began broadcasting from the CDT da Anhanguera.

The program was initially a version of Viva a Noite, which Gugu Liberato had previously hosted on Saturday nights. It was the first television program in Brazil to use the Internet as a way to interact with its audience, through messages sent by viewers via the show's website and later through the UOL Portal, which were read on air during the broadcast. In 1996, the show featured a journalism division, which was the first to report on the assassination of PC Farias and covered the plane crash of the band Mamonas Assassinas on March 2, 1996; the program led the ratings throughout its entire broadcast that day. It also covered the kidnapping of Wellington Camargo, the brother of singers Zezé Di Camargo & Luciano, the ultralight aircraft accident involving singer Herbert Vianna, the rebellion at the Carandiru prison, and the seasonal summer floods in São Paulo.

On June 25, 2009, Gugu signed a contract with Record after 16 years at the helm of Domingo Legal. Three days later, on June 28, the program changed its time slot, moving to noon, with the Programa Silvio Santos airing at 4 PM. On July 12, 2009, Celso Portiolli took over as host of Domingo Legal, a position he holds to this day.

=== Celso Portiolli Era (2009–Present) ===
Among the new features introduced in the program were the debut of segments like Você Não Vale Nada, Mas Eu Gosto de Você, Medidas Desesperadas, TV Sushi, and Game Legal, alongside the return of Piscina Maluca, and the segments Lendas Urbanas and Telegrama Legal.

In 2013, a reboot of Passa ou Repassa began. The show, considered the "launching pad" for Portiolli's career, was included as a segment. Initially, the segment followed the format aired between the late 1980s and early 2000s (pre-recorded). Soon, the format was adapted to be broadcast live. For the most part, it was "broken up" between other segments and formats featured in the program.

On January 27, 2013, in partnership with SBT's Journalism Department and SBT RS, Domingo Legal provided coverage of the Kiss nightclub fire in Santa Maria, Rio Grande do Sul. The coverage was anchored by journalist Marcelo Torres. On November 30, 2014, again in partnership with SBT's Journalism Department, the program covered the wake of comedian Roberto Gómez Bolaños, the creator of El Chavo del Ocho and El Chapulín Colorado, series that were highly successful on SBT for many years. Anchored by journalist Carlos Nascimento and reporter Magdalena Bonfiglioli, the broadcast showed live images from the Estadio Azteca in Mexico City.

In August 2015, the debut of the program Mundo Disney caused Domingo Legal to be broadcast from 1 PM to 3 PM. To compensate for the two lost hours, Celso Portiolli was given a second version of the program, named Sabadão, aired on Saturday nights. On December 7, 2016, Portiolli announced that the program would be canceled by the end of that year, motivated by constant ratings drops, and was slated to be relocated to Saturday afternoon, taking over the time slot belonging to Programa Raul Gil. However, the cancellation project was itself canceled after the network decided to renew Raul Gil's contract in late January 2017.

Changes in the network's programming and the cancellation of a new version of Sessão Desenho led to the program returning to its original four-hour duration. A program previously hosted by Portiolli in the late 1990s, Xaveco, also received a reboot as a segment, much like Passa ou Repassa.

On November 22, 2019, the death of Gugu Liberato was announced. The following Sunday, the 24th, the program featured a special edition remembering the period when the late presenter hosted the show. On March 15, 2020, the program was aired without a live studio audience, a first since its 1993 debut. The main reason was the advancing COVID-19 pandemic, which affected all of SBT's programs in general, forcing them to halt activities for an indefinite period. After two months of reruns, the program returned with new episodes on May 31, 2020, but only airing the Passa ou Repassa segment, which featured a virtual audience, while other segments continued as reruns. On September 27, 2020, the program returned to being broadcast live after two months of reruns and three months of airing pre-recorded Passa ou Repassa episodes.

On November 7, 2021, a special edition aired in homage to Marília Mendonça, who was a victim of a plane crash in Piedade de Caratinga, Minas Gerais. The program also included journalistic coverage of the accident, remembered some of Marília's moments on the show, and broadcast clips from her concerts. Because of this, a scheduled episode of Passa ou Repassa for that day was canceled. On May 1, 2022, the program once again welcomed a live studio audience, after two years without one due to COVID-19 restrictions.

On January 17, 2023, the program celebrated 30 years on the air, and a special edition aired on the 22nd. It featured Passa ou Repassa with challenges from the Eles e Elas segment, a performance by Bruno & Marrone, and a major retrospective remembering the best moments of the show under the leadership of Gugu Liberato (1959–2019) and Celso Portiolli. On the 29th, the segment O Domingo Que Mudou Minha Vida debuted, where people who had been on the show recalled their participation in 30 weekly stories.

Following the end of Programa Eliana on June 23, 2024, after its host's departure, Domingo Legal gained a longer duration, entering a new phase on June 30. The show continues to start at 11:30 AM but now ends around 6:15 PM. Initially, it alternated between pre-recorded and live moments, but this changed by mid-September, when it started live with Passa ou Repassa and the remainder pre-recorded. It also gained new segments and inherited some from the canceled program.

== Ratings ==
Domingo Legal experienced significant ratings milestones throughout its history. It first achieved leadership on March 2, 1996, with its coverage of the Mamonas Assassinas plane crash, scoring a record 37 points. The program frequently competed for the top spot against Domingão do Faustão between 1997 and 2001 and reached its all-time peak of 44 points on May 6, 2001, with a special appearance by Jean-Claude Van Damme. Despite a decline in 2003, it regained leadership several times from 2005 to 2008. After Celso Portiolli took over in 2009, the show saw lower averages, but it later recorded notable ratings, including its highest since 2009 (11 points) with a 2019 tribute to Gugu Liberato. More recently, on October 19, 2025, it achieved its highest ratings of that year, peaking at 10 points thanks to appearances by singers Ana Castela and Zé Felipe.

== Controversies ==
=== Accusations of sensationalism and inappropriate content ===
During the 1990s and 2000s, the show became known for broadcasting shocking stories and some urban legends, such as the case of the Chupacabra. These stories captured the audience's attention in the promotional teasers, very frequently leading the program to sole leadership in the Sunday ratings. However, the program was heavily criticized for its journalistic coverage, especially for relying on dramatizations, which were seen as exaggerated and sensationalist by critics at the time. Furthermore, the program was also accused of excessively sexualizing women and having children perform songs containing double entendres on air.

=== Interview with Denise Tacto ===
In 1998, the show attempted to broadcast an interview with Denise Tacto, then the wife of actor Gerson Brenner. The episode became one of the most emblematic moments in the fight against Domingão do Faustão, as SBT and Globo were airing live simultaneously, with the São Paulo-based network represented by Sonia Abrão. However, Brenner was, at the time, under an exclusive contract with TV Globo, and an interview would require authorization from the Rio-based network. The case was marked by Sonia's irritation, who uttered the following phrase, receiving support from Gugu and the audience: "The people from Rede Globo are demanding exclusivity. Denise Tacto is crying a lot because of all this that is happening. They are trying to remove us from here, but we need to hear Denise's words." She then concluded with: "All television networks have the right to broadcast this moment. What you are doing is disrespectful to the entire Brazilian public, it is disrespectful to SBT, it is disrespectful to the democracy of information in this country."

=== Banheira do Gugu ("Gugu's Bathtub") ===
In September 2000, the Ministry of Justice issued a warning against SBT due to the broadcast of Banheira do Gugu ("Gugu's Bathtub"), requesting a change in its time slot or the editing of the images. On October 15, 2000, the Banheira do Gugu segment was prohibited from being aired before 8 PM by the Court of Justice of Minas Gerais, for featuring semi-nude women and men in their underwear or swimwear. According to the court's allegation, the competition, which awarded points in the Eles e Elas segment, was being broadcast at an unsuitable time, since the challenge involved a couple dueling in a bathtub with the clear objective of one competitor grabbing the largest number of soap bars, while being prevented by their opponent. Gugu took the segment off the air on the 22nd of the same month. In November, the São Paulo court overturned the injunction that suspended the competition and authorized SBT to broadcast the challenge. Despite the legal victory, SBT never held the competition again after mid-2001 of the program's season. Years later, some models who were part of the segment alleged they suffered live harassment on the program in interviews.

=== Gugu-PCC Scandal ===
The Gugu-PCC Scandal was a controversy centered on a forged interview with two men who pretended to be members of the Primeiro Comando da Capital (PCC) criminal organization, conducted by reporter Wagner Maffezoli and aired by Domingo Legal. Due to its repercussion and the threats made against TV hosts and authorities in the fictional interview, the broadcaster was fined, the program was temporarily suspended, and Gugu was sued.

=== Misunderstanding on Xaveco ===
On September 22, 2019, during the broadcast of the Xaveco segment, a game was aired in which the potential love interests chosen by a young man had to iron clothes on a wooden board with a hot iron; the one who performed the task best would win a date, as the segment proposed. However, the broadcast of the episode generated negative backlash on social media, accusing the program of sexism and reinforcing gender stereotypes by assigning a domestic task only to women as a form of competition. In response to the criticism, during the game, host Celso Portiolli admitted that he ironed his own clothes, in an attempt to mitigate the controversy.

=== Interview with Silvana Taques ===
On August 20, 2023, the program aired part of an exclusive interview with Silvana Taques, mother of actress and singer Larissa Manoela, who was engaged in a legal battle against her parents over accusations of misappropriation of funds. The interview, conducted by journalist Chris Flores, sparked negative reactions on part of social media, which accused SBT of being biased and adopting a sensationalist tone by giving a voice primarily to the parents' side. Meanwhile, another part of the public defended the broadcaster, arguing that TV Globo, which had interviewed Larissa, did not give the same platform to her family's version of events. That same night, Fantástico aired the second part of the interview with Larissa Manoela and broadcast a statement left by the actress's parents.
