= Mamonas Assassinas =

Brazilian rock band

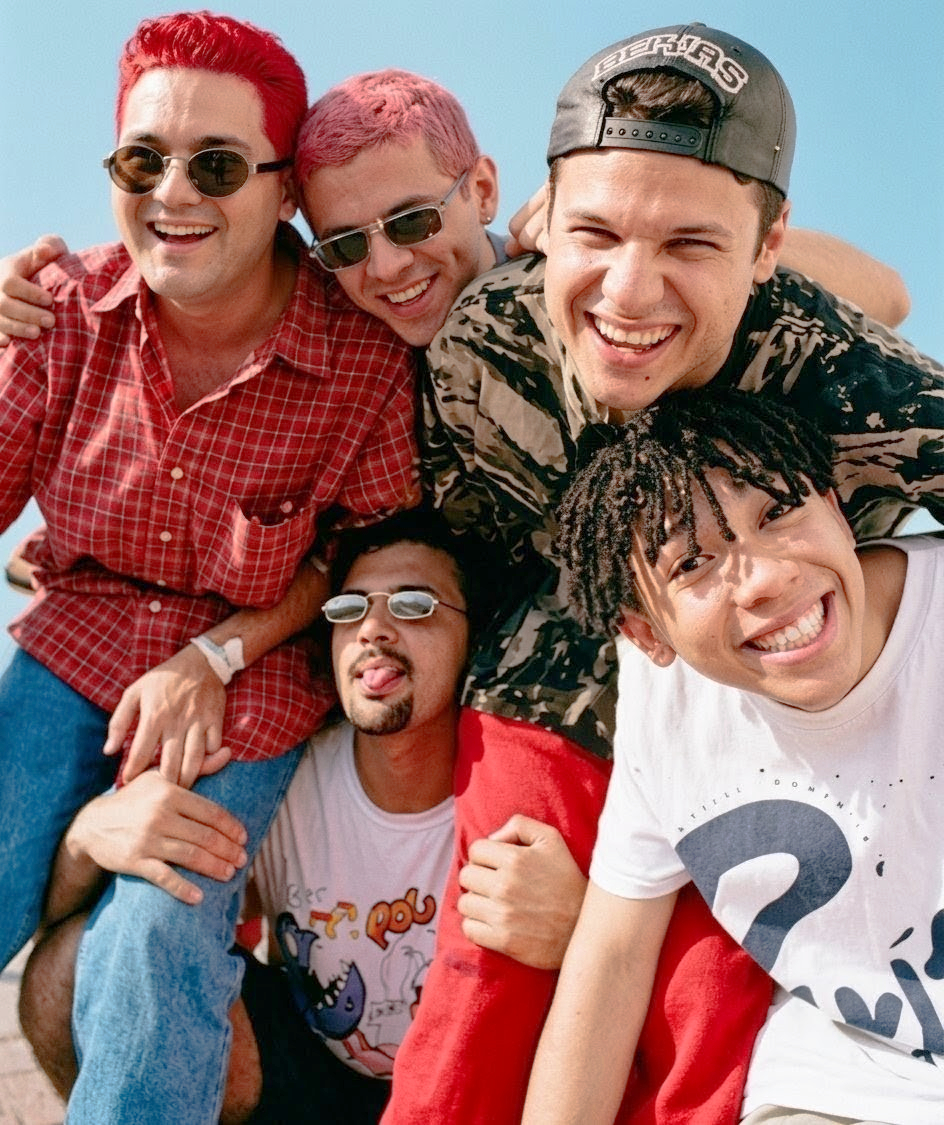
- Mamonas Assassinas in the 1990s. Clockwise from bottom: Sérgio Reoli, Júlio Rasec, Samuel Relio, Dinho and Bento Hinoto.

Background information
- Also known as: Utopia (1989–1994)
- Origin: Guarulhos, São Paulo, Brazil
- Genres: Comedy rock, novelty, pop rock, heavy metal, forró, hard rock, pagode, progressive rock, alternative rock
- Years active: 1989–1996
- Label: EMI
- Past members: Dinho; Samuel Reoli; Júlio Rasec; Sérgio Reoli; Bento Hinoto; Marcio Araujo

Mamonas Assassinas was a Brazilian comedy rock band from Guarulhos. Known originally as Utopia, their musical style employed a humorous mixture between rock and a wide range of styles, often borrowing elements from other music, among which were the main riff of the Portuguese Vira ("Vira-Vira"), Northeastern Brazilian rhythms like forró ("Jumento Celestino"), Mexican music ("Pelados em Santos"), heavy metal ("Débil Metal"), sertanejo ("Bois Don't Cry"), and even pagode ("Lá Vem o Alemão"). Widely beloved in their native Brazil, the band are widely regarded as one of the most popular bands to come out of the 1990s Brazilian music scene.

The band's name mamonas refers to the name of the Castor oil plant, which contains the highly toxic compound ricin (their logo incorporated a castor bean), while also being a double entendre where it could be understood as "big mammary", with the band even having translated the name into English as "Killer Big Breasts". This is illustrated in the cover of the band's debut album with the drawing of a busty topless woman, inspired by Playboy model Mari Alexandre.

On 2 March 1996, the plane in which the band was traveling crashed into the Cantareira mountain range, near São Paulo, killing all five band members. Their short lived and "meteoric" success were celebrated for decades and the band are considered widely influential in Brazil.

== History ==
=== Early years and major era ===
The band started its activities in 1989 as a trio, without Dinho and Júlio, performing covers of Legião Urbana and Rush. Dinho joined the band shortly after, and Júlio, who had initially been hired as a percussionist, replaced original keyboardist Marcio Araujo, and the band, then going as Utopia, performed in the suburbs of São Paulo. They managed to release an album, but it sold less than 100 copies. When it was clear that their comic skills and funny songs were better accepted than their serious performance, the band decided to fully embrace the comedy in their music, including a change to a double entendre name. Their first demo reached the artistic director of EMI-Odeon, João Augusto Soares. Soares didn't like the music, but his teenage son, Rafael, loved it. Convinced by his son, João Augusto hired the band.

=== The plane crash ===
The band's successful career came to an end along with all band members' lives on 2 March 1996, due to a plane crash. After a show in Brasília, the band was flying to São Paulo-Guarulhos International Airport, in Guarulhos. They were going home to spend a day off with their families since the next day they would travel to Portugal to start a new tour. The plane crashed at the Serra da Cantareira, 20 miles away from the airport at 23:16 BRT. Along with the band members, four other people died in the crash: Jorge Germano, the pilot; Alberto Takeda, the co-pilot; Isac Souto, a roadie and Dinho's cousin; and Sérgio Saturnino, their body guard.

Band member Júlio Rasec told his hairdresser (who made a video in his salon of it) he'd had a nightmare the previous evening about a plane crashing and that he did not know what that meant. Júlio seemed deeply disturbed about it and it is reported that he was upset and introverted during the whole day. His hairdresser told Julio he'd pray for them. The video was aired multiple times on TV and it was the subject of several TV shows and documentaries.

The deaths of all members of the band created a great commotion in Brazil, because at the time they were the most famous band in the country. The country was also still mourning the death of Ayrton Senna two years before.

The aircraft was a Learjet 25 that was having multiple radar problems even prior to takeoff. On final approach to land on runway 09R, the pilot decided to abort the attempt and went-around. A went-around is a standard procedure that normally directs the plane to turn left to avoid colliding with other aircraft; however, in Guarulhos, due to the terrain, planes must turn to the right. This was not observed by the pilot, who followed the conventional instruction instead. As it flew around the runway for a second attempt to land, at 23:16 p.m., it crashed into the side of a heavily forested mountain in the Cantareira range, at an altitude of one thousand meters. (Brazil Standard Time, UTC-3:00). When it became clear that there was no longer any response from the aircraft, a pilot of Varig Flight 854 noticed a dense, dark cloud of smoke in the area. Rescue teams arrived at the crash site hours later, in a hard-to-access mountainous region. No one was found alive.

=== Videography ===
- 1996: MTV na Estrada (MTV on the Road) (re-released in DVD in 2004)
- 2002: Show Ao Vivo em Valinhos 1996 (Live in Valinhos)
- 2008: Por Toda Minha Vida - Mamonas Assassinas (Exhibited in TV Globo)
- 2011: Mamonas para sempre (Documentary)

== Band members ==
=== Principal members ===
- Alecsander Alves Leite (known as Dinho) – lead vocals, occasional acoustic guitar (1989–1996; his death)
- Bento Hinoto – guitars, backing vocals, occasional bass guitar (1989–1996; his death)
- Samuel Reoli – bass guitar, backing vocals (1989–1996; his death)
- Sérgio Reoli – drums, percussion (1989–1996; his death)
- Júlio Rasec – keyboards, percussion, backing and occasional co-lead vocals (1989–1996; his death)

=== Early members ===
- Marcio Araujo – keyboards (1989–1992)

== Discography ==
=== Studio albums ===
Year	Album
1992	A Fórmula do Fenômeno, as Utopia: Released: 1992; Label: Independent
1995	Mamonas Assassinas: Released: 1995; Label: EMI

=== Compilation albums ===
Year	Album
1998	Atenção, Creuzebek: A Baixaria Continua (1998, posthumous album): Released: 1998; Label: EMI

=== Live albums ===
Year	Album
2006	Mamonas Ao Vivo (2006, posthumous album): Released: September 24, 2006; Label: EMI

=== Singles ===
Year	Single	Album
1995	"Pelados em Santos"	Mamonas Assassinas
1995	"Robocop Gay"	Mamonas Assassinas
1995	"Vira-Vira"	Mamonas Assassinas
1995	"1406"	Mamonas Assassinas
