= Vira (dance) =

Traditional Portuguese dance

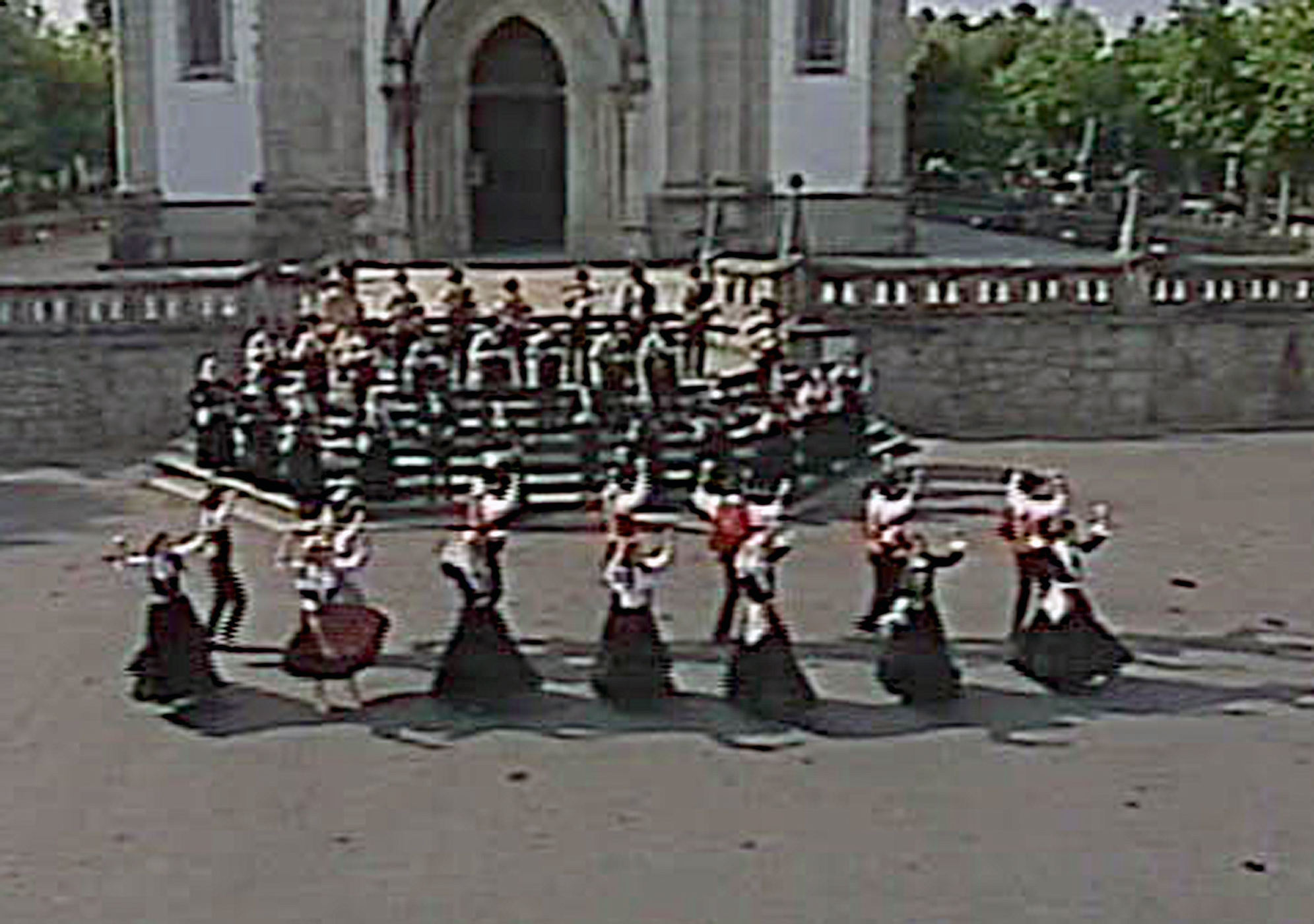
Vira do Minho

The vira (from virar, meaning "to turn") is a traditional dance from Portugal. It is most popular in the Minho region but is performed in every region. It has a three-step rhythm which is very similar to a waltz, but it is faster, and the couples dance front-to-front without holding hands.

Another way to dance the vira is as follows: matched pairs form a big circle that revolves inversely clockwise, while the dancers snap their fingers. At a certain point the boys leave their pairs in the circle and go to the center, where they hit the floor with their right feet, and return, backing into their respective pairs. The circle starts to rotate again, and the next time the circle stops, it will be the girls who go to the center. They do this alternately.

Some Portuguese composers have adapted the vira into their compositions. For example, Manuel Raposo Marques (1902-1966) incorporated it into a choral work recorded by the Orfeon Académico de Coimbra.

The vira is normally performed on the street.
