= List of Anitta live performances =

Anitta live performances
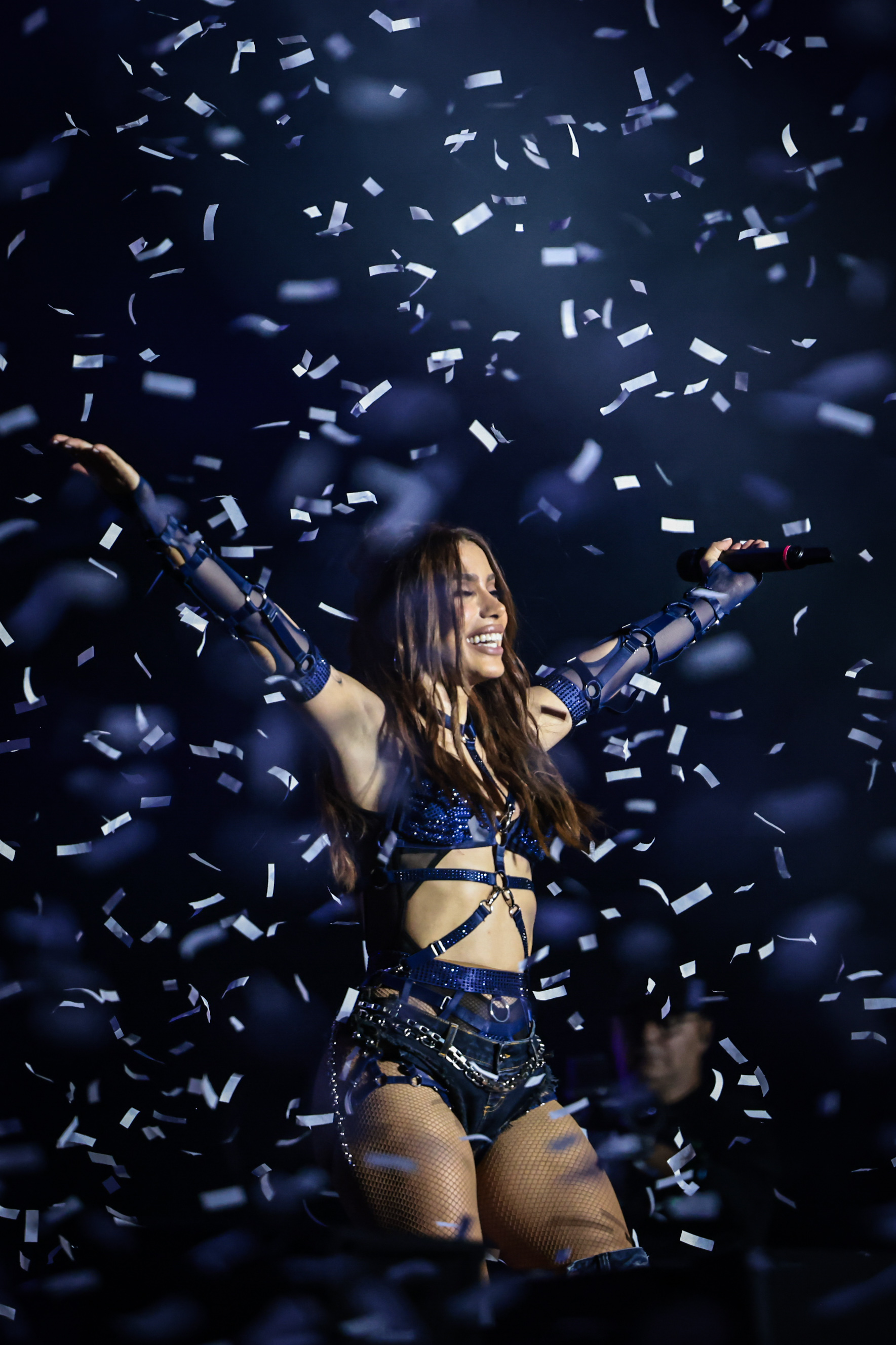
- Anitta during a show in January 2026.
- Tour: 6
- Promotional tours: 4
- Sports and Games events: 11
- Benefit performances: 14

The Brazilian singer and actress Anitta has embarked on five tours, one of which was worldwide. She has also held three promotional concerts. Her first tour was the Show das Poderosas Tour, which took place in Brazil, United States, and Europe, promoting her debut album, Anitta, released in 2013.

In 2014, she launched her second tour, Meu Lugar Tour.

With the release of her third studio album, Anitta embarked on the Bang Tour, which ran from April 2016 to December 2017.

On July 27, 2019, Anitta began the Kisses Tour to promote her fourth studio album, Kisses (2019). The tour has traveled to countries such as Belgium, Switzerland, Spain, Italy, England, Portugal, United States, Brazil, Czech Republic, and Uruguay.

On December 31, 2017, the singer drew a crowd of 2.4 million people at the New Year's Eve in Copacabana, making it to the List of Most-Attended Concerts.

On May 18, 2024, the singer began her first entirely international tour, the Baile Funk Experience, to promote her sixth studio album, Funk Generation (2024). The tour started in Mexico and will visit the United States, Canada, Colombia, Peru, Chile, Argentina, Germany, Netherlands, England, France, Italy, and will conclude in Spain.

On December 31, 2024, the New Year's Eve in Copacabana, with Anitta as the headline performer, drew a crowd of over 2.6 million people.

== Tour ==
Title	Dates	Associated album(s)	Continents	Shows
Show das Poderosas Tour	June 6, 2013 – June 13, 2014	Anitta	South America Europe	171
Setlist of the Show das Poderosas Tour: 1. "Show das Poderosas"; 2. "Proposta"; 3. "Cachorro Eu Tenho Em Casa"; 4. "Eu Vou Ficar"; 5. Medley Internacional; 6. "Achei"; 7. "Príncipe de Vento"; 8. Medley Funk I 9. Medley MPB I 10. "Meiga e Abusada"; 11. "Fica Só Olhando"; 12. "Tá na Mira"; 13. Medley MPB II; 14. "Zen"; 15. Medley Axé; 16. "Não Para"; 17. "Pretin"; 18. "Eu Sou Assim"; 19. Medley Funk II; 20. "Menina Má"; 21. "Não Para"; 22. "Show das Poderosas"
Turnê Meu Lugar	June 14, 2014 – April 2, 2016	Meu Lugar Ritmo Perfeito	South America Asia	249
Setlist of the Meu Lugar Tour: 1. "Não Para"; 2. "Menina Má"; 3. "Proposta"; 4. "Cachorro Eu Tenho Em Casa"; 5. "Eu Sou Assim"; 6. "Fica Só Olhando"; 7. "Ritmo Perfeito"; 8. Medley: "Achei" / "Príncipe de Vento"; 9. "Zen"; 10. "Quem Sabe"; 11. "Música de Amor"; 12. "Cobertor"; 13. "Mulher"; 14. "Eu Vou Ficar (Remix)"; 15. "Tá na Mira"; 16. "Meiga e Abusada"; 17. "Na Batida"; 18. "Movimento da Sanfoninha"; 19. "No Meu Talento"; 20. "Blá Blá Blá"; 21. "Show das Poderosas"
Bang Tour	April 7, 2016 – December 16, 2017	Bang!	South America	183
Setlist of the Bang Tour: 1. "Não Para"; 2. "Blá Blá Blá"; 3. "Ritmo Perfeito / "Ginza (Anitta Remix)"; 4. "Bang"; 5. "Blecaute (Slow Funk)" / "Deixa Ele Sofrer"; 6. "Cobertor"; 7. "Zen"; 8. "Will I See You"; 9. "Downtown"; 10. "Is That for Me"; 11. "Paradinha"; 12. "Loka"; 13. "Você Partiu Meu Coração"; 14. "Essa Mina É Louca"; 15. "Sua Cara"; 16. "Movimento da Sanfoninha"; 17. "Medley Funk"; 18. "Sim ou Não"; 19. "Show das Poderosas"
Kisses Tour	July 27, 2019 – February 26, 2020	Kisses	Europe North America South America	77
Setlist of Kisses Tour: 1. "Bang"; 2. "Combatchy"; 3. "Terremoto"; 4. "Ao Vivo e A Cores"; 5. "Complicado"; 6. Medley: "Cobertor" / "Zen"; 7. "Some Que Ele Vem Atrás"; 8. "Romance com Safadeza"; 9. Medley: "Loka" / "Você Partiu Meu Coração" / "Essa Mina É Louca"; 10. "Contatinho"; 11. "Medicina'; 12. "Paradinha"; 13. "Make It Hot"; 14. "Sua Cara"; 15. "Sim ou Não"; 16. "Movimento da Sanfoninha"; 17. "Vai Malandra"; 18. "Satisfaction"; 19. "Bola Rebola"; 20. "Onda Diferente"; 21. "Favela Chegou"; 22. "Show das Poderosas"
Baile Funk Experience	May 18, 2024 — July 8, 2024	Funk Generation	North America South America Europe	22
Setlist of Baile Funk Experience: 1. "Carta de Amor" (Intro / Maria Bethânia Interlude); 2. "Funk Rave"; 3. "Grip"; 4. "Joga pra Lua"; 5. "Savage Funk"; 6. "Double Team"; 7. "Mil Veces"; 8. "Aquecimento Gaiolagem" (Corvina DJ Interlude); 9. "Used to Be"; 10. "Love in Common"; 11. "Fria"; 12. "Meme"; 13. "Movimento da Sanfoninha"; 14. "Sabana" (contains elements of "Down"); 15. "Lose Ya Breath"; 16. "Cria de Favela"; 17. "Puta Cara"; 18. "Is That for Me" / "Fuego" / "Simply the Best" / "Aceita" (Interlude); 19. "Garota de Ipanema" (cover de Tom Jobim / Acapella Intro) / "Girl from Rio"; 20. "Me Gusta"; 21. "Envolver"; 22. "Bellakeo"; 23. "Downtown"; 24. "Onda Diferente"; 25. "Bola Rebola"; 26. "Rave de Favela"; 27. "Vai Malandra"; 28. "Boys Don't Cry"
Equilibrivm Tour	August 1, 2026 — November 7, 2026	Equilibrivm	South America	8
Setlist of Equilibrivm Tour: 1. "Ouro"; 2. "Contemplação"; 3. "Ternura"; 4. "É d'Oxum"; 5. "Ogum Me Rodeia"; 6. "Deus Mãe"; 7. "Sem Pressa"; 8. "Bemba"; 9. "Caminhador"; 10. "Andar com Fé"; 11. "Eu Não Sou Santa"; 12. "Nanã"; 13. "Não Me Cutuca"; 14. "Desgraça"; 15. "Mandinga"; 16. "Feitiço"; 17. "Pinterest"; 18. "Respira"; 19. "Ponta do Pé"; 20. "So Much Love"; 21. "Caso de Amor"; 22. "Tudo Isso"; 23. "Deus Existe"; 24. "Abre Caminho"; 25. "Presente de Um Beija-Flor"; 26. "Cravo e Canela"; 27. "Divino Sexual"; 28. "Pra Você Gostar de Mim"; 29. "Você Já Sabe"; 30. "Choka Choka"; 31. "Sal Grosso"; 32. "Vai Dar Caô"; 33. "Meia Noite"; 34. "Okê"

== Promotional ==
Title	Date	Continents	Shows
Chá da Anitta	November 29, 2014 – September 19, 2016	South America	11
Chá da Anitta is a special tour in partnership with the Rio de Janeiro musical event Chá da Alice. Unlike other tours, each Chá da Anitta show has a different theme, with setlists, sets, costumes, and choreography developed specifically for the party.
Show das Poderosinhas	October 10, 2015 – October 27, 2019	South America	28
The tour is aimed at a child and teenage audience, with setlists, sets, costumes, and choreography developed specifically for the party.
Made in Brazil	June 16, 2018 – July 6, 2018	South America Europe	7
The tour was directed by Rodrigo Pitta and paid homage to Brazilian culture, featuring the Brazilian singer Carmen Miranda with a similar costume and performing her choro "Tico-tico no Fubá", the song "Garota de Ipanema" by Tom Jobim, and the Copacabana boardwalk.
Euro Summer Tour 2022	June 21, 2022 – July 17, 2022	Europe	11
A tour dedicated to Europe.

== Carnival Parade ==
Title	Date	Continents	Shows
Bloco da Anitta	January 14, 2016 – Present	South America	18
The show is a carnival bloc created by Brazilian singer Anitta for Carnival, which has been held since 2016, between January and March. The bloco was originally created under the name Bloco das Poderosas.
Ensaios da Anitta	January 20, 2019 – Present	South America Europe	57
"Ensaios da Anitta" (Anitta's Rehearsals) are musical events held annually by singer Anitta in the weeks leading up to Carnival. Featuring live performances, these rehearsals serve to warm up the audience and test the setlists and choreographies that will be presented during the Carnival blocks. The rehearsals mix various popular genres, such as funk, rock, pop, reggaeton and axé, and often feature special guest appearances. This event has become a tradition in Brazil's pre-Carnival calendar. On February 5, 2026, Anitta confirmed the first international edition of the event, in Lisbon, Portugal.

== Presentations ==
=== Sports and Games events ===
Date	Event	Country
August 5, 2016	Olympics Opening Ceremony	Brazil
November 12, 2017	Formula 1	Brazil
November 11, 2018	Formula 1	Brazil
July 7, 2019	Copa América	Brazil
November 23, 2019	Copa Libertadores	Peru
October 1, 2020	FIFA 21 Game Worldwide Launch	Brazil
November 27, 2021	Copa Libertadores	Uruguay
September 12, 2021	Thriller Fight Club	United States
May 5, 2022	Formula 1	United States
June 10, 2023	UEFA Champions League	Turkey
September 6, 2024	Halftime NFL Kickoff Game	Brazil
November 24, 2024	Free Fire World Series - Global Finals	Brazil
June 12, 2026	2026 FIFA Word Cup	United States

=== Benefit performances ===
Date	Event	Country
August 15, 2015	Criança Esperança	Brazil
November 4, 2016	Teleton	Brazil
November 5, 2016	Teleton	Brazil
April 27, 2017	amfAR Gala	Brazil
August 19, 2017	Criança Esperança	Brazil
October 28, 2017	Teleton	Brazil
September 11, 2019	Luisa Mell Institute Auction	Brazil
December 7, 2019	Live in Madureira	Brazil
October 23, 2021	Dear Earth - YouTube Originals	-
December 1, 2021	Community Organized Relief Effort	United States
September 28, 2022	Sotheby‘s Impact Gala	United States
December 2, 2022	Community Organized Relief Effort	United States
September 23, 2023	Global Citizen Festival	United States
October 15, 2025	13th Liberatum Cultural Award	United Kingdom
November 1, 2025	Global Citizen Festival	Brazil
November 5, 2025	The Earthshot Prize	Brazil

=== Holiday season ===
Date	Event	Country
December 7, 2013	Natal Mágico da Xuxa	Brazil
December 25, 2013	Especial Roberto Carlos	Brazil
December 31, 2013	Show da Virada	Brazil
January 1, 2014	Réveillon Absoluto	Brazil
December 31, 2014	Show da Virada	Brazil
December 31, 2016	Show da Virada	Brazil
December 31, 2017	New Year's Eve in Copacabana	Brazil
December 29, 2019	Réveillon da Virada	Brazil
December 31, 2019	Réveillon de Paulista	Brazil
December 31, 2019	Réveillon Parador Recife	Brazil
December 31, 2020	Réveillon da Univision - New York	United States
December 3, 2021	KIIS-FM Jingle Ball	United States
December 3, 2021	iHeartRadio Jingle Ball	United States
December 28, 2021	Réveillon N1	Brazil
December 31, 2021	Miley's New Year's Eve Party	United States
December 18, 2022	Y100 Jingle Ball 2022	United States
December 28, 2022	Réveillon Emoções Viva BG	Brazil
December 29, 2022	Réveillon Let's Pipa	Brazil
December 31, 2022	Réveillon Vista	Brazil
December 8, 2023	Carnatal	Brazil
December 28, 2023	Festival Virada Salvador 2024	Brazil
December 29, 2023	Réveillon Praia do Forte	Brazil
December 30, 2023	A Villa Réveillon Buzios	Brazil
December 31, 2023	Réveillon Vista	Brazil
December 7, 2024	Carnatal	Brazil
December 28, 2024	Let's Pipa Réveillon	Brazil
December 29, 2024	Réveillon Mil Sorrisos	Brazil
December 30, 2024	Brava Beach Club	Brazil
December 31, 2024	New Year's Eve in Copacabana	Brazil
January 1, 2025	Réveillon Vista	Brazil
December 28, 2025	Virada na Praia 2026	Brazil
December 29, 2025	Réveillon 2026	Brazil
December 31, 2025	Réveillon Tropical 2026	Brazil

=== Awards ===
==== 2010s ====
Date	Event	Country
September 3, 2013	Multishow Brazilian Music Awards	Brazil
December 28, 2013	Caldeirão de Ouro	Brazil
March 16, 2014	Melhores do Ano	Brazil
September 11, 2014	Globo de Ouro	Brazil
October 28, 2014	Multishow Brazilian Music Awards	Brazil
November 20, 2014	Latin Grammy Awards	United States
January 3, 2015	Caldeirão de Ouro	Brazil
September 1, 2015	Multishow Brazilian Music Awards	Brazil
October 15, 2015	Meus Prêmios Nick	Brazil
December 13, 2015	Melhores do Ano	Brazil
January 2, 2016	Caldeirão de Ouro	Brazil
April 20, 2016	Globo de Ouro	Brazil
October 25, 2016	Multishow Brazilian Music Awards	Brazil
December 18, 2016	Melhores do Ano	Brazil
January 7, 2017	Caldeirão de Ouro	Brazil
October 24, 2017	Multishow Brazilian Music Awards	Brazil
December 10, 2017	Melhores do Ano	Brazil
January 6, 2018	Caldeirão de Ouro	Brazil
February 22, 2018	Premio Lo Nuestro 2018	United States
May 24, 2018	MTV Millennial Awards Brazil	Brazil
June 3, 2018	MTV Millennial Awards	Mexico
September 25, 2018	Multishow Brazilian Music Awards	Brazil
October 25, 2018	Latin American Music Awards	United States
October 31, 2018	GQ Hombres del Año	Mexico
December 9, 2018	Melhores do Ano	Brazil
February 21, 2019	Premio Lo Nuestro	United States
March 21, 2019	Premio Tu Musica Urbano	Puerto Rico
April 25, 2019	Billboard Latin Music Awards	United States
May 14, 2019	Premios Gardel	Argentina
July 4, 2019	MTV Millennial Awards Brazil	Brazil
October 29, 2019	Multishow Brazilian Music Awards	Brazil
November 8, 2019	Los 40 Music Awards	Spain
November 14, 2019	Latin Grammy Awards	United States
November 21, 2019	Urban Music Awards	Colombia

==== 2020s ====
Date	Event	Country
January 4, 2020	Caldeirão de Ouro	Brazil
September 24, 2020	MTV Millennial Awards Brazil	Brazil
November 19, 2020	Latin Grammy Awards	United States
May 9, 2021	Latin Grammy Awards - Ellas y Sú Música	United States
July 1, 2021	Heat Latin Music Awards	Dominican Republic
July 22, 2021	Premios Juventud	Puerto Rico
September 12, 2021	MTV Video Music Awards	United States
November 18, 2021	Latin Grammy	United States
February 24, 2022	Premio Lo Nuestro	United States
August 28, 2022	MTV Video Music Awards	United States
November 4, 2022	LOS40 Music Awards	Spain
November 17, 2022	Latin Grammy	United States
November 20, 2022	American Music Awards	United States
September 12, 2023	MTV Video Music Awards	United States
February 22, 2024	Premio Lo Nuestro	United States
April 25, 2024	Latin American Music Awards	United States
July 25, 2024	Premios Juventud	Puerto Rico
September 11, 2024	MTV Video Music Awards	United States
November 14, 2024	Latin Grammy	United States
December 3, 2024	Multishow Brazilian Music Awards	Brazil
April 25, 2025	Billboard Latin Women in Music	United States

=== Television, specials and radio broadcasts ===
==== 2010s ====
Date	Event	Country
September 9, 2012	TV Xuxa	Brazil
May 11, 2013	TV Xuxa	Brazil
July 13, 2013	Raul Gil	Brazil
January 1, 2014	Sai do Chão	Brazil
February 17, 2014	5 Para a Meia Noite	Portugal
February 19, 2014	Los 40 principales	Spain
May 10, 2014	Legendários	Brazil
May 23, 2014	Sálvame	Spain
June 8, 2014	Hora do Faro	Brazil
June 10, 2014	Música Boa Ao Vivo	Brazil
December 3, 2014	Altas Horas	Brazil
December 12, 2014	Amor & Sexo	Brazil
January 15, 2015	Mais Você	Brazil
February 5, 2015	Baile da Vogue	Brazil
March 28, 2015	Legendários	Brazil
April 22, 2015	Especial de 50 anos (Globo)	Brazil
April 26, 2015	Programa da Sabrina	Brazil
August 23, 2015	Domingão do Faustão	Brazil
October 14, 2015	Elle Fashion Preview	Brazil
October 25, 2015	Domingão do Faustão	Brazil
December 19, 2015	Altas Horas	Brazil
January 7, 2016	Mais Você	Brazil
January 30, 2016	Programa da Sabrina	Brazil
February 13, 2016	Caldeirão do Huck	Brazil
March 17, 2016	Domingão do Faustão	Brazil
May 29, 2016	Hora do Faro	Brazil
August 6, 2016	Caldeirão do Huck	Brazil
August 27, 2016	Programa da Sabrina	Brazil
August 28, 2016	Hora do Faro	Brazil
November 9, 2016	X Factor	Brazil
November 29, 2016	Programa do Jô	Brazil
December 24, 2016	Altas Horas	Brazil
February 3, 2017	Big Brother Brasil	Brazil
February 16, 2017	Baile da Vogue	Brazil
May 6, 2017	Altas Horas	Brazil
May 7, 2017	Hora do Faro	Brazil
May 26, 2017	The Tonight Show Starring Jimmy Fallon	United States
June 1, 2017	Tu Night	Mexico
June 2, 2017	Exa FM	Mexico
June 15, 2017	Conversa Com Bial	Brazil
June 24, 2017	Caldeirão do Huck	Brazil
October 7, 2017	Altas Horas	Brazil
November 6, 2017	Billboard Live	United States
November 14, 2017	Spotify ¡Viva Latino! 2017	United States
November 15, 2017	Latin Recording Academy Person of the Year	United States
December 17, 2017	Hora do Faro	Brazil
December 17, 2017	Fantástico	Brazil
February 20, 2018	Don Francisco Te Invita	United States
February 21, 2018	The Enrique Santos Show	United States
April 21, 2018	São Paulo Fashion Week	Brazil
May 3, 2018	Fama, ¡a bailar!	Spain
May 5, 2018	Caldeirão do Huck	Brazil
June 12, 2018	Staff de Noticias	Argentina
June 13, 2018	Morfi, todos a la mesa	Argentina
August 25, 2018	Caldeirão do Huck	Brazil
November 7, 2018	Telehit 25 Años	Mexico
November 13, 2018	La Voz... México	Mexico
November 23, 2018	MTV Argentina	Argentina
November 28, 2018	Estudios Mega	Chile
November 29, 2018	Día a Día	Colombia
December 3, 2018	Billboard Studios	United States
December 12, 2018	Hoy	Mexico
December 12, 2018	La Voz... México	Mexico
April 8, 2019	Fama, ¡a bailar!	Spain
April 8, 2019	El Chiringuito de Jugones	Spain
June 12, 2019	Al aire con Paola Rojas	Mexico
June 12, 2019	Hoy	Mexico
June 13, 2019	Exa FM	Mexico
June 13, 2019	Cuéntamelo YA!	Mexico
June 14, 2019	Los 40 Principales	Mexico
November 11, 2019	El Hormiguero	Spain

==== 2020s ====
Date	Event	Country
September 23, 2020	The Tonight Show Starring Jimmy Fallon	United States
May 2, 2021	Fantástico	Brazil
May 3, 2021	Today Show	United States
May 4, 2021	Jimmy Kimmel Live!	United States
July 24, 2021	Hard Rock Live	United States
November 3, 2021	The Late Late Show with James Corden	United States
November 25, 2021	Black das Blacks Magalu	Brazil
January 16, 2022	Domingão com Huck	Brazil
January 31, 2022	The Tonight Show Starring Jimmy Fallon	United States
March 27, 2022	Fantástico	Brazil
April 15, 2022	Good Morning America	United States
May 27, 2022	Carpool Karaoke: The Series	United States
June 23, 2022	NRJ Hit Music Only - C'Cauet	France
June 25, 2022	Quotidien	France
September 17, 2022	Caldeirão com Mion	Brazil
November 8, 2022	Savage x Fenty Show Vol.4	United States
December 15, 2022	Amazon Music Live	United States
January 18, 2023	Big Brother Brasil	Brazil
August 20, 2023	Domingão com Huck	Brazil
August 31, 2023	Hoy	Mexico
September 2, 2023	Altas Horas	Brazil
September 3, 2023	Fantástico	Brazil
September 17, 2023	Pipoca da Ivete	Brazil
October 2, 2023	La Musica Es Universal	United States
November 15, 2023	Latin Recording Academy Person of the Year	Spain
November 20, 2023	Operacion Triunfo	Spain
November 22, 2023	Federico Vigevani's - "La Posada Del Año"	Mexico
February 4, 2024	Domingão com Huck	Brazil
February 17, 2024	Apoteose do Samba - Sambadrome Marquês de Sapucaí	Brazil
May 14, 2024	The Voice	United States
May 31, 2024	The Today Show - Citi Concert Series	United States
October 13, 2024	Fantástico	Brazil
January 15, 2025	Big Brother Brasil	Brazil
September 12, 2025	Estrela da Casa	Brazil
January 16, 2026	Big Brother Brasil	Brazil
April 5, 2026	Domingão	Brazil
April 11, 2026	Saturday Night Live	United States
April 13, 2026	Em Família com Eliana	Brazil
May 12, 2026	Upfront 2026 TelevisaUnivision	United States
August 2, 2026	Fantástico	Brazil
August 7, 2026	Mais Você	Brazil
August 14, 2026	Altas Horas	Brazil
September 20, 2026	Coronation of the "Grande Rio" queen	Brazil

=== Concerts ===
==== 2010s ====
Date	Event / Location	Country
April 5, 2014	Rio Verão Festival	Brazil
May 23, 2014	Los40 Primavera Pop Barcelona	Spain
May 24, 2014	Los40 Primavera Pop Madrid	Spain
September 27, 2014	São Paulo Mix Festival	Brazil
December 8, 2014	Altice Arena	Portugal
May 3, 2015	Diamond Hall	Japan
May 4, 2015	DIFFER Ariake	Japan
May 5, 2015	Clube Mauí	Japan
November 5, 2015	YouTube FanFest Brasil	Brazil
November 13, 2016	VillaMix Festival	Brazil
June 18, 2017	São Paulo Gay Pride Parade	Brazil
February 22, 2018	LIV Miami	United States
April 14, 2018	MiamiBash	United States
May 4, 2018	Los40 Primavera Pop	Spain
May 17, 2018	Cosmopolitan Fashion Night	Mexico
June 12, 2018	Teatro Vorterix	Argentina
June 12, 2018	Talento Fox	Argentina
June 24, 2018	Rock in Rio Lisboa	Portugal
June 26, 2018	Le Trianon	France
June 28, 2018	Royal Albert Hall	England
November 14, 2018	YouTube Music: Ritmo Global	United States
December 1, 2018	Megaland Music Fest	Colombia
December 5, 2018	Festival Mega Bash	United States
February 21, 2019	LIV	United States
April 9, 2019	Museo Nacional Centro de Arte Reina Sofía	Spain
April 24, 2019	Drai's Beachclub & Nightclub	United States
May 4, 2019	Festival Sons do Atlântico	Angola
May 10, 2019	Movistar Arena	Chile
May 12, 2019	Teatro Ópera	Argentina
July 27, 2019	Tomorrowland	Belgium
July 28, 2019	Halle 622 Zürich	Switzerland
July 30, 2019	Pacha	Spain
August 2, 2019	Arenal Sound	Spain
August 4, 2019	Milano Latin Festival	Italy
August 6, 2019	Nile Rodgers' Meltdown	United Kingdom
August 7, 2019	Festival MEO Sudoeste	Portugal
August 10, 2019	Dale Fuego Festival	United States
August 31, 2019	Teatro Teletón	Chile
September 5, 2019	SaSaZu Club	Czech Republic
September 21, 2019	Concierto EXA 2019	Mexico
October 5, 2019	Rock in Rio	Brazil

==== 2020s ====
Date	Event / Location	Country
January 3, 2020	Enjoy Live Punta del Este	Uruguay
February 15, 2020	Jockey Club	Paraguay
February 16, 2020	Gran Nobile Hotel & Convention	Paraguay
September 11, 2021	Triller Fight Club	United States
September 25, 2021	Billboard Latin Music Week	United States
October 1, 2021	Uforia Mix Live	United States
November 11, 2021	LIV	United States
February 24, 2022	LIV	United States
April 3, 2022	Hakkasan	United States
April 15, 2022	Coachella Valley Music and Arts Festival	United States
April 22, 2022	Coachella Valley Music and Arts Festival	United States
May 13, 2022	Billboard MusicCon	United States
May 14, 2022	Love Loud Festival	United States
June 11, 2022	LA pride! in the park	United States
June 14, 2022	Can't Cancel Pride	United States
June 21, 2022	Pacha	Spain
June 25, 2022	Mother Pride Block Party	Ireland
June 26, 2022	Rock in Rio Lisboa	Portugal
June 29, 2022	Roskilde Festival	Denmark
July 1, 2022	Lollapalooza Estocolmo	Sweden
July 2, 2022	Pal Mundo Festival	Netherlands
July 4, 2022	Montreux Jazz	Switzerland
July 13, 2022	Milano Latin Festival	Italy
July 15, 2022	GurtenFestival	Switzerland
July 16, 2022	Lollapalooza Paris	France
July 17, 2022	MEO Marés Vivas	Portugal
August 20, 2022	Garota Vip	Brazil
February 2, 2023	Spotify's Best New Artist Party 2023	United States
February 18, 2023	Carvalheira na Ladeira	Brazil
February 19, 2023	CarnaRildy	Brazil
February 20, 2023	Bloco do Urso	Brazil
February 21, 2023	Carnaval na Cidade	Brazil
August 30, 2023	Exa FM	Mexico
November 25, 2023	Megaland Music Fest	Colombia
December 2, 2023	Mega Bash	United States
December 10, 2023	TikTok in the Mix 2023	United States
February 28, 2024	Viña del Mar International Song Festival	Chile
March 30, 2024	Tecate Pa’l Norte	Mexico
May 18, 2024	Tecate Emblema	Mexico
June 29, 2024	Solidays	France
July 12, 2024	Beach, Please! Festival	Romania
July 13, 2024	BST Hyde Park	United Kingdom
July 24, 2024	Fifty Eight	Puerto Rico
August 9, 2024	Festival Sudoeste	Portugal
August 30, 2024	Charms Festival	Mexico
November 3, 2024	Parada Skol	Paraguay
November 10, 2024	Rock The Mountain	Brazil
November 17, 2024	Rock The Mountain	Brazil
January 31, 2025	Planeta Atlântica	Brazil
August 8, 2025	Baja Beach Fest	Mexico
August 20, 2025	Exclusive H&M show	Brazil
September 29, 2025	Le Défilé L'Oréal Paris	France
October 18, 2025	Halloween Sephora	Brazil
January 30, 2026	Planeta Atlântica	Brazil
February 14, 2026	Carvalheira na Ladeira	Brazil
February 16, 2026	Carnaval na Cidade	Brazil
February 17, 2026	CarnaRildy	Brazil
February 21, 2026	Nosso Camarote	Brazil
July 11, 2026	Village Festival	Brazil
July 19, 2026	Lollapalooza Berlin	Germany
October 17, 2026	MELI MUSIC	Brazil
September 31, 2026	Rock The Mountain	Brazil

== Guest appearances ==
Date	Event / Location	Artist	Country
October 12, 2016	Allianz Parque	Andrea Bocelli	Brazil
October 19, 2016	Arena da Baixada	Andrea Bocelli	Brazil
October 14, 2018	Z Festival	Camila Cabello	Brazil
October 28, 2018	Vibras Tour	J Balvin	United States
December 2, 2018	Megaland Music Fest	Greeicy	Colombia
October 5, 2019	Rock in Rio	Black Eyed Peas	Brazil
August 7, 2020	Gallipoli	Fred de Palma	Italy
March 20, 2022	We Are Carnaval	Harmonia do Samba	United States
March 26, 2022	Lollapalooza Brasil	Miley Cyrus	Brazil
June 18, 2022	Parc des Princes	Dadju	France
September 3, 2022	Summer Festival	Leo Santana	United States
February 17, 2024	Trio da Ivete Sangalo	Ivete Sangalo	Brazil
April 19, 2024	Coachella	Peso Pluma	United States
May 4, 2024	The Celebration Tour	Madonna	Brazil
July 24, 2024	BST Hyde Park	Kylie Minogue	United Kingdom
September 7, 2024	São Paulo Concert	The Weeknd	Brazil
January 21, 2025	A Melhor Segunda do Mundo	Xanddy Harmonia	Brazil
April 5, 2025	Tempo Rei Tour	Gilberto Gil	Brazil
September 3, 2025	After Hours til Dawn Tour	The Weeknd	United States
September 6, 2025	Tardezinha	Thiaguinho	Brazil
November 1, 2025	Global Citizen Festival	Chris Martin	Brazil
April 20, 2026	After Hours til Dawn Tour	The Weeknd	Mexico
April 21, 2026	After Hours til Dawn Tour	The Weeknd	Mexico
April 22, 2026	After Hours til Dawn Tour	The Weeknd	Mexico
April 26, 2026	After Hours til Dawn Tour	The Weeknd	Brazil
April 30, 2026	After Hours til Dawn Tour	The Weeknd	Brazil
May 1, 2026	After Hours til Dawn Tour	The Weeknd	Brazil
May 2, 2026	Las Mujeres Ya No Lloran World Tour - Todo Mundo no Rio	Shakira	Brazil

== See also ==
- Anitta Discography
- Anitta Awards
