= Anitta discography =

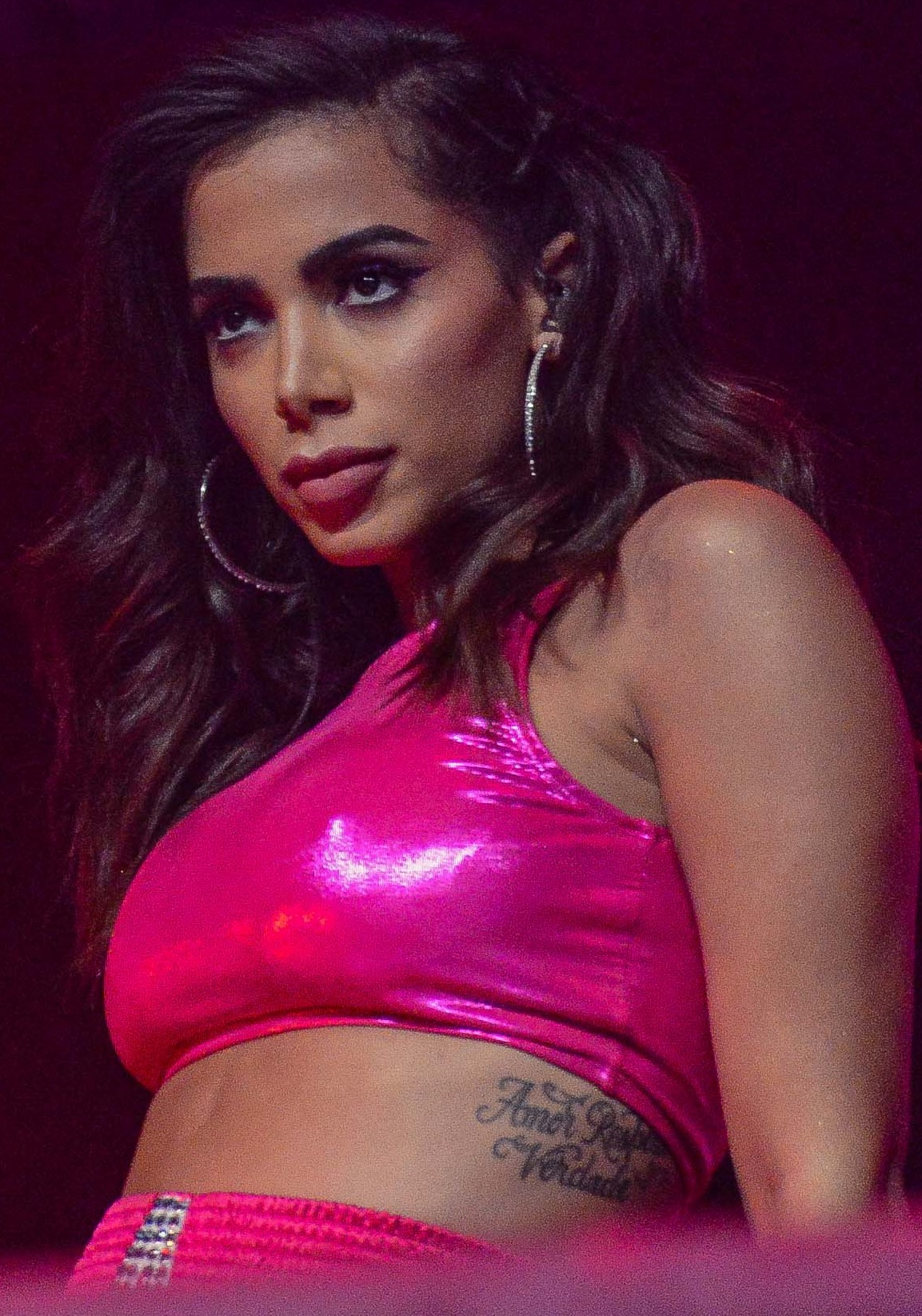
- Anitta performing at a concert in November 2017
- Studio albums: 7
- EPs: 8
- Soundtrack albums: 3
- Live albums: 1
- Singles: 133
- Promotional singles: 16

Brazilian singer Anitta has released seven studio albums, one live album, one video album, three soundtrack albums, eight extended plays, 133 singles (including 36 as a featured artist) and 16 promotional singles. Anitta was discovered by music producer DJ Batutinha via YouTube in 2010. She eventually signed a record deal with Warner Music Brazil in 2013 and released her debut album, Anitta, that same year, which reached number one and was certified as a gold album in Brazil. Her debut album also produced four singles, including the commercially successful hits "Show das Poderosas" and "Zen".

Ritmo Perfeito (2014) is Anitta's second studio album, which peaked at number two in Brazil and featured five singles, including "Blá Blá Blá", "Na Batida" and "Ritmo Perfeito". In 2015, Anitta released her third studio album, Bang!, which became her best-selling album to date, selling over 300,000 copies in Brazil.

In 2016, Anitta began expanding her success to Latin America. That year, she was featured in a remix of J Balvin's hit single "Ginza" and also released "Sim ou Não", a duet with Colombian singer Maluma. Anitta was later featured on Australian rapper Iggy Azalea's single "Switch" and on Major Lazer's "Sua Cara" which also features Pabllo Vittar in 2017. That same year, she released "Paradinha", her first solo single in Spanish. A series of non-album collaboration singles, such as "Is That For Me" with Swedish producer Alesso, "Downtown" with J Balvin and "Vai Malandra" with MC Zaac, DJ Yuri Martins, the duo Tropkillaz and the American rapper Maejor, followed later in 2017. Kisses (2019) became Anitta's fourth studio album, which received critical acclaim and was nominated for a Latin Grammy Award for Best Urban Music Album. Also in 2019, Anitta was featured in a number of songs released by artists such as Madonna, DJ Snake, Sean Paul, Snoop Dogg, Ozuna, Natti Natasha, Sofia Reyes and Rita Ora.

Later in 2020, Anitta announced her fifth studio album, Versions of Me, and released its lead single "Me Gusta", which features Cardi B and Myke Towers, and became Anitta's first entry on the Billboard Hot 100 chart. "Girl from Rio and "Faking Love" featuring Saweetie followed as the album's next singles in 2021, both charting on the US Billboard Mainstream Top 40 Airplay chart. Later that year, Anitta released the album's fourth single "Envolver", which achieved international charts success, giving Anitta's highest entries on the Billboard Global 200 and Billboard Global Excl. U.S., at numbers five and two, respectively, and broke a string of records, including the Spotify record for most streamed song in a single-day in 2022 (7.278 million), biggest streaming day for a female Latin song, as well as the first song by a Brazilian artist and first solo Latin song to reach the top of the Spotify Global Daily chart. It also broke the record for most one-day streams in Brazil with over 4.5 million plays, a record that was previously held by herself with her 2017 single "Vai Malandra".

Anitta sold over 10 million records in Brazil (certified singles and albums, including features), being one of the most successful female singers in the country.

== Albums ==
=== Studio albums ===
List of studio albums, with selected chart positions
Title	Album details	Peak chart positions								Sales	Certifications (sales threshold)
Title	Album details	BRA	US Heat	US Latin	FRA	IRE	POR	SPA	SWI	Sales	Certifications (sales threshold)
Anitta	Released: 6 July 2013; Label: Warner Brasil; Formats: CD, digital download, streaming	1	—	—	—	—	—	—	—	BRA: 170,000	PMB: Platinum
Ritmo Perfeito	Released: 3 June 2014; Label: Warner Brasil; Formats: CD, digital download, streaming	2	—	—	—	—	—	—	—	BRA: 50,000	
Bang!	Released: 13 October 2015; Label: Warner Brasil; Formats: CD, digital download, streaming	3	—	—	—	—	—	—	—	BRA: 300,000	
Kisses	Released: 5 April 2019; Label: Warner Brasil; Formats: Digital download, streaming	*	—	16	—	—	—	— (Note: "Kisses" did not enter the Spanish chart, but peaked at number 46 on the Spanish Streaming Albums chart.)	—	BRA: 300,000	PMB: Diamond
Versions of Me	Released: 12 April 2022; Label: Warner; Formats: Digital download, streaming	*	2	—	55	—	—	51	—	BRA: 300,000	PMB: Diamond
Funk Generation	Released: 26 April 2024; Label: Floresta, Republic, Universal Latin; Formats: CD, LP digital download, streaming	*	—	—	—	36	3	90	71		
Ensaios da Anitta	Released: 5 December 2024; Label: Universal, Republic; Formats: Digital download, streaming	*	—	—	—	—	35	—	—		
Equilibrium	Released: 16 April 2026; Label: Floresta, Republic, Universal Latin; Format: Digital download, streaming	*	—	—	—	—	5	—	—		
Equilibrium II	Released: 23 July 2026; Label: Floresta, Republic, Universal Latin; Format: Digital download, streaming	*	—	—	—	—	4	—	—		
"—" denotes items which did not chart in that country. "*" denotes the chart is discontinued.

=== Live albums ===
List of live albums, with selected chart positions
Title	Album details	Peak chart positions	Sales
Title	Album details	BRA	Sales
Meu Lugar	Released: 4 June 2014; Label: Warner Brasil; Formats: CD, DVD, digital download, streaming	1	BRA: 150,000

=== Soundtrack albums ===
List of soundtrack albums and selected details
Title	Details
Clube da Anittinha (Note: Credited as Anittinha)	Released: 12 October 2018; Label: Warner Brasil; Formats: CD, digital download, streaming
Clube da Anittinha 2 (Note: Credited as Anittinha)	Released: 29 May 2020; Label: Warner Brasil; Formats: CD, digital download, streaming
Clube da Anittinha 3 (Note: Credited as Anittinha)	Released: 4 February 2022; Label: Rodamoinho Records, Warner Brasil; Formats: CD, digital download, streaming

== Extended plays ==
List of extended plays and selected details
Title	Details
Anitta	Released: 22 August 2012; Label: K2L, Furacão 2000; Formats: Digital download, streaming
Tá na Mira	Released: 30 April 2013; Label: Warner Brasil; Formats: Digital download, streaming
Anitta Live	Released: 15 December 2013; Label: Warner Brasil; Formats: Digital download, streaming
Remixes	Released: 13 February 2014; Label: Warner Brasil; Formats: Digital download, streaming
Solo	Released: 9 November 2018; Label: Warner Brasil; Formats:Streaming
Spotify Singles	Released: 23 January 2019; Label: Warner Brasil; Formats: Streaming
À Procura da Anitta Perfeita	Released: 30 November 2022; Label: Warner Brasil; Formats: Digital download, streaming
Funk Generation: A Favela Love Story	Released: 17 August 2023; Label: Floresta, Republic, Universal; Formats: Digital download, streaming

== Singles ==
=== As lead artist ===
List of singles as lead artist, with selected chart positions and certifications, showing year released and album name
Title	Year	Peak chart positions										Certifications	Album
Title	Year	BRA	ARG	COL	ITA	MEX	POR	SPA	SWI	US	US Latin	Certifications	Album
"Menina Má"	2012	—	—	—	—	—	—	—	—	—	—		Anitta
"Meiga e Abusada"	2012	41	—	—	—	—	—	—	—	—	—		Anitta
"Liberdade Pra Dentro Da Cabeça (Ao Vivo)"	2013	—	—	—	—	—	—	—	—	—	—		Anitta
"Show das Poderosas"	2013	2	—	—	—	—	— (Note: The Portuguese main chart was suspended from 2004 to 2016, however "Show das Poderosas" peaked at number 18 on the Portugal Digital Songs chart.)	—	—	—	—		Anitta
"Não Para"	2013	3	—	—	—	—	—	—	—	—	—		Anitta
"Zen" (solo or featuring Rasel)	2013	1	—	—	—	—	—	—	—	—	—		Anitta
"Blá Blá Blá"	2014	2	—	—	—	—	—	—	—	—	—		Meu Lugar
"Cobertor" (featuring Projota)	2014	45	—	—	—	—	—	—	—	—	—		Ritmo Perfeito
"Na Batida"	2014	3	—	—	—	—	—	—	—	—	—		Ritmo Perfeito
"Ritmo Perfeito"	2014	2	—	—	—	—	—	—	—	—	—		Ritmo Perfeito
"No Meu Talento" (solo or featuring MC Guimê)	2015	14	—	—	—	—	—	—	—	—	—		Ritmo Perfeito
"Deixa Ele Sofrer"	2015	6	—	—	—	—	—	—	—	—	—		Bang!
"Bang"	2015	9	—	—	—	—	—	—	—	—	—		Bang!
"Essa Mina é Louca" (featuring Jhama)	2016	14	—	—	—	—	—	—	—	—	—		Bang!
"Cravo e Canela" (featuring Vitin)	2016	36	—	—	—	—	—	—	—	—	—		Bang!
"Sim ou Não" / "Sí o No" (featuring Maluma)	2016	15	—	—	—	42	—	—	—	—	—	PMB: 3× Diamond; AFP: Gold	Non-album singles
"Paradinha"	2017	3	—	48	—	— (Note: "Paradinha" did not enter the Mexico Airplay chart, but peaked at number 25 on the Mexican Espanol Airplay chart.)	54	—	—	—	—	PMB: Diamond; AFP: Platinum	Non-album singles
"Is That for Me" (with Alesso)	2017	41	—	—	—	— (Note: "Is That For Me" did not enter the Mexico Airplay chart, but peaked at number 7 on the Mexico Ingles Airplay chart.)	53	—	—	— (Note: "Is That for Me" did not enter the Billboard Hot 100, but peaked at number 24 on the Billboard Hot/Dance Electronic Songs chart.)	—	PMB: 4× Platinum	Non-album singles
"Downtown" (with J Balvin)	2017	33	15	9	—	— (Note: "Downtown" did not enter the Mexico Airplay chart, but peaked at number 14 on the Mexican Espanol Airplay chart.)	7	8	73	—	14	PMB: 3× Diamond; AFP: 3× Platinum; ASINCOL: 5× Platinum; CAPIF: Platinum; FIMI: Gold; PROMUSICAE: 3× Platinum; RIAA: 6× Platinum (Latin); SNEP: Gold	Non-album singles
"Vai Malandra" (with Zaac and Maejor featuring Tropkillaz and DJ Yuri Martins)	2017	24	—	—	—	—	4	—	—	—	—	PMB: 3× Diamond; AFP: 3× Platinum	Non-album singles
"Machika" (with J Balvin and Jeon)	2018	99	17	1	14	45	32	14	94	— (Note: "Machika" did not enter the Billboard Hot 100, but peaked at number 16 on the Bubbling Under Hot 100 Singles chart.)	10	PMB: Diamond; AFP: Gold; AMPROFON: Platinum; FIMI: Platinum; PROMUSICAE: Gold; RIAA: Platinum (Latin)	Vibras
"Indecente"	2018	37	—	—	—	— (Note: "Indecente" did not enter the Mexico Airplay chart, but peaked at number 48 on the Mexican Espanol Airplay chart.)	40	—	—	—	—	AFP: Gold; RIAA: Gold (Latin)	Non-album singles
"Medicina"	2018	27	42	41	—	26	15	—	—	—	— (Note: "Medicina" did not enter the Billboard Hot Latin Songs chart, but peaked at number 35 on the Billboard Latin Pop Songs chart.)	AFP: Gold; RIAA: Gold (Latin)	Non-album singles
"Veneno"	2018	— (Note: "Veneno" did not enter the Brasil Hot 100 Airplay chart, but peaked at number 14 on the Pro-Música Brasil Top 50 Top 50 Streaming chart.)	96	24	—	— (Note: "Veneno" did not enter the Mexico Airplay chart, but peaked at number 18 on the Mexican Espanol Airplay chart.)	19	—	—	—	—	AFP: Platinum; RIAA: Gold (Latin)	Solo
"Não Perco Meu Tempo"	2018	35	—	—	—	—	70	—	—	—	—		Solo
"Terremoto" (with Kevinho)	2019	23	—	—	—	—	4	—	—	—	—	AFP: 2× Platinum	Non-album singles
"Bola Rebola" (with Tropkillaz and J Balvin featuring Zaac)	2019	— (Note: "Bola Rebola" did not enter the Brasil Hot 100 Airplay chart, but peaked at number 1 on the Pro-Música Brasil Top 50 Top 50 Streaming chart.)	—	92	—	—	12	—	—	—	46	PMB: 2× Diamond; AFP: 2× Platinum; RIAA: Platinum (Latin)	Non-album singles
"Poquito" (with Swae Lee)	2019	46	—	14	—	30	51	—	—	—	—	PMB: Gold	Kisses
"Onda Diferente" (with Ludmilla and Snoop Dogg featuring Papatinho)	2019	64	—	—	—	—	49	—	—	—	—	AFP: Platinum	Kisses
"Banana" (with Becky G)	2019	—	—	—	—	—	63	—	—	—	— (Note: "Banana" did not enter the Billboard Hot Latin Songs chart, but peaked at number 8 on the Billboard Latin Digital Song Sales chart.)	PMB: Gold	Kisses
"Get to Know Me" (with Alesso)	2019	—	—	—	—	—	—	—	—	—	—		Kisses
"Rosa" (with Prince Royce)	2019	—	—	—	—	—	—	—	—	—	—		Kisses
"Some Que Ele Vem Atrás" (with Marília Mendonça)	2019	15	—	—	—	—	65	—	—	—	—	PMB: 2× Diamond; AFP: Platinum	Non-album singles
"Combatchy" (with Lexa and Luísa Sonza featuring Rebecca)	2019	— (Note: "Combatchy" did not enter the Brasil Hot 100 Airplay chart, but peaked at number 1 on the Pro-Música Brasil Top 50 Top 50 Streaming chart.)	—	—	—	—	25	—	—	—	—	PMB: 2× Diamond; AFP: 2× Platinum	Non-album singles
"Meu Mel" (with Melim)	2019	90	—	—	—	—	—	—	—	—	—	PMB: Platinum	Non-album singles
"Até o Céu" (with MC Cabelinho)	2019	—	—	—	—	—	—	—	—	—	—	PMB: 2× Platinum	Non-album singles
"Jogação" (with Psirico)	2020	—	—	—	—	—	—	—	—	—	—	PMB: Gold	Non-album singles
"Tócame" (featuring Arcángel and De La Ghetto)	2020	—	—	19	—	13	94	—	—	—	— (Note: "Tócame" did not enter the Billboard Hot Latin Songs chart, but peaked at number 9 on the Billboard Latin Digital Song Sales chart.)	PMB: 2× Platinum; AFP: Gold	Non-album singles
"Me Gusta" (featuring Cardi B and Myke Towers or remix featuring 24kGoldn)	2020	14	59	22	—	18	19	82	56	91	5	PMB: 3× Diamond; AFP: Platinum	Versions of Me
"Loco"	2021	—	—	—	—	13	113	—	—	—	— (Note: "Loco" did not enter the Billboard Hot Latin Songs chart, but peaked at number 25 on the Billboard Latin Digital Song Sales chart.)	PMB: Platinum	Non-album single
"Girl from Rio" (solo or featuring DaBaby)	2021	11	93	—	— (Note: "Girl from Rio" did not enter the FIMI singles chart, but peaked at number 29 on the Italian Airplay chart.)	13	40	—	—	— (Note: "Girl from Rio" did not enter the Billboard Hot 100, but peaked at number 24 on the Billboard Mainstream Top 40 Airplay chart.)	—	PMB: Diamond; AFP: Gold	Versions of Me
"Faking Love" (featuring Saweetie)	2021	45	—	—	—	— (Note: "Faking Love" did not enter the Mexico Airplay chart, but peaked at number 24 on the Mexico Ingles Airplay chart.)	82	—	—	— (Note: "Faking Love" did not enter the Billboard Hot 100, but peaked at number 34 on the Billboard Mainstream Top 40 Airplay chart.)	—	PMB: Diamond; AFP: Gold	Versions of Me
"Envolver"	2021	1	13	9	43	2	2	13	17	70	3	PMB: 3× Platinum; AFP: 4× Platinum; AMPROFON: 4× Platinum+Gold; FIMI: Platinum; PROMUSICAE: 2× Platinum; RIAA: 17× Platinum(Latin); SNEP: Platinum; MC: Gold; PROFOVI: Diamond; ZPAV:Gold	Versions of Me
"No Chão Novinha" (with Pedro Sampaio)	2021	22	—	—	—	—	4	—	—	—	—	PMB: Diamond; AFP: 2× Platinum	Chama Meu Nome
"Boys Don't Cry"	2022	17	—	—	—	—	23	—	—	— (Note: "Boys Don't Cry" did not enter the Billboard Hot 100, but peaked at number 33 on the Billboard Mainstream Top 40 Airplay chart.)	—	PMB: 2× Platinum; AFP: 2× Platinum	Versions of Me
"Gata" (featuring Chencho Corleone)	2022	—	—	—	—	—	84	—	—	—	—	PMB: Platinum	Versions of Me
"El Que Espera" (Note: This song only appears on the deluxe edition of Versions of Me.) (with Maluma)	2022	—	91	—	—	—	105	—	—	—	— (Note: "El Que Espera" did not enter the Billboard Hot Latin Songs chart, but peaked at number 16 on the Billboard Latin Digital Song Sales chart.)		Versions of Me
"Lobby" (with Missy Elliott)	2022	—	—	—	—	—	155	—	—	—	—		Versions of Me
"Ai Papai" (with MC Danny and Hitmaker)	2022	11	—	—	—	—	12	—	—	—	—	AFP: Platinum	À Procura da Anitta Perfeita
"Nu" (with Hitmaker)	2023	—	—	—	—	—	185	—	—	—	—		Non-album singles
"Vai Vendo" (with MC Ryan SP)	2023	—	—	—	—	—	133	—	—	—	—		Non-album singles
"Funk Rave"	2023	16	—	1	—	1	24	—	—	—	—	RIAA: Gold (Latin)	Funk Generation
"Mil Veces"	2023	22	—	—	—	14	21	—	—	—	— (Note: "Mil Veces" did not enter the Billboard Hot Latin Songs chart, but peaked at number 16 on the Billboard Latin Pop Airplay chart.)	PMB: Diamond; RIAA: Gold (Latin)	Funk Generation
"Bellakeo" (with Peso Pluma)	2023	46	21	18	—	6	24	59	—	53	3	PMB: Diamond; AFP: Platinum; PROMUSICAE: Platinum; AMPROFON: 4× Platinum; RIAA: 38× Platinum (Latin)	Éxodo
"Joga Pra Lua" (with Dennis and Pedro Sampaio)	2023	17	—	—	—	—	48	—	—	—	—	PMB: 3× Diamond; AFP: Gold	Funk Generation
"Double Team" (with Brray and Bad Gyal)	2024	50	—	—	—	—	117	—	—	—	—	PMB: 3× Platinum	Funk Generation
"Grip"	2024	27	—	—	—	—	82	—	—	—	—		Funk Generation
"Aceita" (solo or remix with Jonas Blue)	2024	79	—	—	—	—	—	—	—	—	—		Funk Generation
"Gata Only" (Remix) (with FloyyMenor and Ozuna)	2024	—	—	—	8	—	2	64	—	—	—	PROMUSICAE: Gold	Non-album single
"Alegría" (with Tiago PZK and Emilia)	2024	—	3	—	—	—	—	42	—	—	—	PROMUSICAE: Gold; RIAA: Gold (Latin)	Gotti A
"São Paulo" (with the Weeknd)	2024	5	—	—	30	—	1	78	2	43	—	PMB: 2× Diamond; AFP: Platinum; FIMI: Gold; SNEP: Platinum; PROMUSICAE: Gold; IFPI GRE: 2x Platinum	Hurry Up Tomorrow
"Lugar Perfeito" (with Ivete Sangalo)	2024	—	—	—	—	—	—	—	—	—	—		Ensaios da Anitta
"Romeo"	2025	50	—	—	—	—	134	—	—	—	—		Non-album single
"Bota um Funk" (with Pedro Sampaio & Mc GW)	2025	67	—	—	—	—	14	—	—	—	—		Astro
"En 4" (with Kenia OS)	2025	—	—	—	—	—	—	—	—	—	—		Non-album single
"Gostosin" (with Felipe Amorim)	2025	11	—	—	—	—	71	—	—	—	—		Ensaios da Anitta
"Eu Tô Querendo de Novo" (with Nattan)	2026	66	—	—	—	—	—	—	—	—	—		Non-album single
"La testa gira" (with Fred De Palma and Emis Killa)	2026	—	—	—	1	—	—	—	—	—	—	FIMI: Platinum	Non-album single
"Choka Choka" (with Shakira)	2026	17	—	—	—	—	66	—	—	—	— (Note: "Choka Choka" did not enter the Billboard Hot Latin Songs chart, but peaked at number 5 on the Billboard Latin Digital Song Sales chart.)		Equilibrium
"Goals" (with Lisa and Rema)	2026	—	—	—	—	—	—	—	—	—	—		Official FIFA World Cup 2026 Album
"—" denotes a recording that did not chart or was not released in that territory.

=== As featured artist ===
List of singles as featured artist, with selected chart positions and certifications, showing year released and album name
Title	Year	Peak chart positions											Certifications	Album
Title	Year	BRA	ARG	COL	FRA	ITA	MEX	POR	SPA	SWI	US	US Latin	Certifications	Album
"Take It Easy" (Preta Gil featuring Anitta)	2014	—	—	—	—	—	—	—	—	—	—	—		Bloco da Preta
"Hoje Eu Sonhei Com Você" (Harmonia do Samba featuring Anitta)	2015	—	—	—	—	—	—	—	—	—	—	—		Tá no DNA
"Blecaute (Slow Funk)" (Jota Quest featuring Anitta and Nile Rodgers)	2015	39	—	—	—	—	—	—	—	—	—	—		Pancadélico
"Ginza" (Anitta Remix) (J Balvin featuring Anitta)	2016	—	—	—	—	—	—	—	—	—	—	—	PMB: 3× Diamond	Energia (Brazil Edition)
"Faz Parte" (Projota featuring Anitta)	2016	60	—	—	—	—	—	—	—	—	—	—	PMB: 2× Platinum	3Fs (Ao Vivo)
"Pra Todas Elas" (DJ Tubarão featuring MC Maneirinho e Anitta)	2016	—	—	—	—	—	—	—	—	—	—	—		Faz a Festa Funk
"Loka" (Simone & Simaria featuring Anitta)	2017	6	—	—	—	—	—	—	—	—	—	—	PMB: 5× Diamond	Duetos
"Você Partiu Meu Coração" (Nego do Borel featuring Anitta and Wesley Safadão)	2017	21	—	—	—	—	—	53	—	—	—	—	PMB: 3× Diamond	Non-album singles
"Switch" (Iggy Azalea featuring Anitta)	2017	—	—	—	—	—	—	70	—	—	—	—	PMB: Platinum	Non-album singles
"Sua Cara" (Major Lazer featuring Anitta and Pabllo Vittar)	2017	49	—	—	—	—	—	8	—	—	— (Note: "Sua Cara" did not enter the Billboard Hot 100, but peaked at number 26 on the Billboard Hot/Dance Electronic Songs chart.)	—	PMB: 2× Platinum; AFP: 2× Platinum	Know No Better
Will I See You (Poo Bear featuring Anitta)	2017	—	—	—	—	—	—	—	—	—	—	—	PMB: Platinum	Poo Bear Presents Bearthday Music
"Tic Nervoso" (Harmonia do Samba featuring Anitta)	2017	—	—	—	—	—	—	—	—	—	—	—		Harmonia do Samba - Ao Vivo em Brasília
"Coladinha em Mim" (Gustavo Mioto featuring Anitta)	2017	—	—	—	—	—	—	—	—	—	—	—		Ao Vivo em São Paulo / SP
"Romance com Safadeza" (Wesley Safadão featuring Anitta)	2018	14	—	—	—	—	—	—	—	—	—	—	PMB: 4× Diamond	Non-album single
"Ao Vivo e a Cores" (Matheus & Kauan featuring Anitta)	2018	13	—	—	—	—	—	55	—	—	—	—	PMB: 4× Diamond	Intensamente Hoje!
"Fica Tudo Bem" (Silva featuring Anitta)	2018	—	—	—	—	—	—	78	—	—	—	—	PMB: Diamond	Brasileiro
"Jacuzzi" (Greeicy featuring Anitta)	2018	—	93	55	—	—	—	—	—	—	—	—	PMB: 2× Platinum; ASINCOL: Platinum; RIAA: Gold (Latin)	Baila
"Perdendo a Mão" (Seakret featuring Anitta and Jojo Maronttinni)	2018	—	—	—	—	—	—	—	—	—	—	—		Non-album singles
"Eu Não Vou Embora" (DJ Zullu featuring Anitta and MC G15)	2018	—	—	—	—	—	—	—	—	—	—	—		Non-album singles
"Mala Mía" (Remix) (Maluma featuring Becky G and Anitta)	2018	—	10	16	—	—	1	—	—	—	—	—		Non-album singles
"Zé do Caroço" (JetLag featuring Anitta)	2019	—	—	—	—	—	—	—	—	—	—	—		Non-album singles
"Te lo Dije" (Natti Natasha featuring Anitta)	2019	—	—	—	—	—	—	—	—	—	—	—		Iluminatti
"Favela Chegou" (Ludmilla featuring Anitta)	2019	95	—	—	—	—	—	50	—	—	—	—	PMB: Diamond; AFP: Gold	Hello Mundo
"R.I.P." (Sofía Reyes featuring Rita Ora and Anitta)	2019	—	41	49	—	—	10	36	53	56	—	19	PMB: 4× Platinum; AFP: Platinum; PROMUSICAE: Platinum; RIAA: Platinum (Latin)´	Mal de Amores
"Make It Hot" (Major Lazer featuring Anitta)	2019	88	—	—	—	—	— (Note: "Make It Hot" did not enter the Mexico Airplay chart, but peaked at number 11 on the Mexico Ingles Airplay chart.)	—	—	—	— (Note: "Make It Hot" did not enter the Billboard Hot 100, but peaked at number 23 on the Billboard Hot/Dance Electronic Songs chart.)	-	PMB: Platinum	Non-album singles
"Pa' Lante" (Alex Sensation featuring Anitta and Luis Fonsi)	2019	—	—	—	—	—	—	—	—	—	—	— (Note: "Pa' Lante" did not enter the Billboard Hot Latin Songs chart, but peaked at number 45 on the Billboard Latin Airplay chart.)	PMB: Platinum	Non-album singles
"Muito Calor" (Ozuna featuring Anitta)	2019	42	—	—	—	—	—	—	60	80	—	— (Note: "Muito Calor" did not enter the Billboard Hot Latin Songs chart, but peaked at number 6 on the Billboard Latin Digital Song Sales chart.)		Non-album singles
"Fuego" (DJ Snake featuring Sean Paul, Anitta and Tainy)	2019	—	—	—	—	—	—	63	—	—	— (Note: "Fuego" did not enter the Billboard Hot 100, but peaked at number 31 on the Billboard Hot/Dance Electronic Songs chart.)	—	PMB: Diamond; AFP: Gold	Carte Blanche
"Contatinho" (Leo Santana featuring Anitta)	2019	21	—	—	—	—	—	95	—	—	—	—	PMB: 3× Diamond; AFP: Gold	Levada do Gigante
"Explosion" (with Black Eyed Peas)	2019	—	—	—	—	—	—	—	—	—	—	—		Non-album single
"Complicado" (Vitão featuring Anitta)	2019	96	—	—	—	—	—	92	—	—	—	—	PMB: 2× Diamond; AFP: Gold	Ouro
"Bellaquita" (Remix) (Dalex and Lenny Tavárez featuring Anitta, Natti Natasha, Farruko and Justin Quiles)	2019	—	—	—	—	—	—	—	26	—	—	—	RIAA: 8× Platinum (Latin); PROMUSICAE: Platinum	Modo Avión
"Joga Sua Potranca" (DJ Gabriel do Borel featuring Anitta)	2020	—	—	—	—	—	—	—	—	—	—	—		Non-album singles
"Contando Lunares" (Remix) (Don Patricio featuring Rauw Alejandro and Anitta)	2020	—	100	—	—	—	—	—	—	—	—	—		Non-album singles
"Rave de Favela" (MC Lan and Major Lazer featuring Anitta and Beam)	2020	— (Note: "Rave de Favela" did not enter the Brasil Hot 100 Airplay chart, but peaked at number 6 on the Pro-Música Brasil Top 50 Top 50 Streaming chart.)	—	—	—	—	—	32	—	—	—	—	AFP: Gold	Music Is the Weapon
"Dança Assim" (Preto Show featuring Anitta)	2020	—	—	—	—	—	—	—	—	—	—	—		Banger
"Desce Pro Play (Pa Pa Pa)" (Zaac featuring Anitta and Tyga)	2020	25	—	—	—	—	—	7	—	—	—	—	PMB: 2× Diamond; AFP: Platinum	Non-album single
"Paloma" (Fred de Palma featuring Anitta)	2020	—	—	—	—	4	—	—	—	—	—	—	FIMI: 3× Platinum	Unico
"Tá com o Papato" (Papatinho featuring Anitta, Dfideliz and BIN)	2020	—	—	—	—	—	—	—	—	—	—	—		Non-album single
"Modo Turbo" (Luísa Sonza featuring Pabllo Vittar and Anitta)	2020	— (Note: "Modo Turbo" did not enter the Brasil Hot 100 Airplay chart, but peaked at number 3 on the Pro-Música Brasil Top 50 Streaming chart.)	—	—	—	—	—	7	—	—	—	—	AFP: Platinum; PMB: 4× Diamond	Doce 22
"Tô Preocupada (Calma Amiga)" (Rebecca and DJ Will 22 featuring Anitta)	2021	—	—	—	—	—	—	—	—	—	—	—	PMB: Platinum	Non-album singles
"Mi Niña" (Remix) (Wisin, Maluma and Myke Towers featuring Anitta)	2021	34	—	—	—	—	—	—	83	—	—	—	RIAA: Platinum (Latin)	Non-album singles
"Mon Soleil" (Dadju featuring Anitta)	2021	—	—	—	8	—	—	86	—	—	—	—	PMB: Gold; SNEP: Diamond	Poison ou Antidote (Miel Book Edition)
"Un Altro Ballo" (Fred de Palma featuring Anitta)	2021	—	—	—	—	10	—	—	—	—	—	—	FIMI: 2× Platinum	Unico
"Sextou" (Rennan da Penha featuring Anitta)	2021	—	—	—	—	—	—	—	—	—	—	—		Non-album single
"Todo o Nada" (Lunay featuring Anitta)	2021	—	—	—	—	—	3	—	85	—	—	33	PROMUSICAE: Gold	El Niño
"Lá Mamá de la Mamá" (Remix) (El Alfa featuring Anitta, Busta Rhymes, CJ, Wisin and El Cherry Scom)	2021	—	—	—	—	—	—	—	—	—	—	—		Non-album single
"Quiero Rumba" (Dímelo Flow featuring Anitta and Chimbala)	2021	—	—	—	—	—	—	—	—	—	—	—		Always Dream
"Suéltate" (Sam I featuring Anitta, Bia, Jarina De Marco)	2021	—	—	—	—	—	—	—	—	—	—	—		Sing 2
"Que Vamo' Hacer?" (Lenny Tavárez featuring Anitta)	2022	—	—	—	—	—	—	—	—	—	—	—		Krack Deluxe
"Dançarina" (Remix) (Pedro Sampaio featuring Anitta, Nicky Jam, Dadju, and MC Pedrinho)	2022	—	—	—	11	—	—	—	—	—	—	—	PMB: 2× Diamond; AFP: 3× Platinum; SNEP: Platinum	Versions of Me
"Tudo Nosso" (Filipe Ret featuring Anitta and Dallass)	2022	—	—	—	—	—	—	—	—	—	—	—	PMB: 3× Platinum	Lume
"La Loto" (Tini featuring Becky G and Anitta)	2022	63	7	—	—	—	23	151	78	—	—	— (Note: "La Loto" did not enter the Billboard Hot Latin Songs, but peaked at number 16 on the Latin Pop Airplay chart.)	AMPROFON: Gold; CAPIF: Platinum; PMB: Platinum; PROMUSICAE: Gold; CUD: 2× Platinum	Cupido
"No Más" (Murda Beatz featuring Quavo, J Balvin, Anitta and Pharrell Williams)	2022	—	—	—	—	—	—	—	—	—	—	—		Non-album singles
"Simply the Best" (Black Eyed Peas featuring Anitta and El Alfa)	2022	—	—	—	—	95	—	—	—	—	30	—	FIMI: Gold	Elevation
"Proibidona" (Gloria Groove featuring Anitta and Valesca Popozuda)	2023	—	—	—	—	—	—	—	—	—	—	—	PMB: Platinum	Futuro Fluxo
"Mais Uma" (Zaac featuring Anitta and DJ Yuri Martins featuring Zain)	2023	—	—	—	—	—	—	76	—	—	—	—		Fé na Caminhada
"Pilantra" (Jão featuring Anitta)	2023	23	—	—	—	—	—	23	—	—	—	—	AFP: Gold	Non-album singles
"Capitán" (RVFV featuring Anitta and Sfera Ebbasta)	2023	—	—	—	—	26	—	—	100	—	—	—	FIMI: Gold	Non-album singles
"24 Horas" (Papatinho and Steve Aoki featuring Anitta, MC Kevin o Chris and MC Caverinha)	2023	—	—	—	—	—	—	—	—	—	—	—		Baile do Papato
"Back for More" (with Tomorrow X Together)	2023	41	—	—	—	—	—	69	—	—	— (Note: "Back For More" did not enter the Billboard Hot 100, but peaked at number 11 on the Bubbling Under Hot 100 Singles chart.)	—		Non-album singles
"Monstrão" (Dennis featuring Anitta)	2023	73	—	—	—	—	—	—	—	—	—	—	PMB: Platinum	Non-album singles
"Bota Niña" (Bad Gyal featuring Anitta)	2024	—	—	—	—	—	86	—	—	—	—	—	PMB: Gold	La Joia
"Faldas y Gistros" (Justin Quiles featuring Anitta and Lenny Tavarez)	2024	—	—	—	—	—	—	—	—	—	—	—		Non-album single
"Um Por Cento (Un x100to)" (Grupo Menos é Mais featuring Anitta)	2024	—	—	—	—	—	—	—	—	—	—	—		Virado no Pagode (Ao Vivo)
"Arena y Sal" (Remix) (Omar Montes and Sech featuring Anitta, Yandel, Saiko, FMK, Lit Killah and Tunvao)	2024	—	—	—	—	—	—	—	75	—	—	—		Non-album single
"Peligrosa" (Wisin and Shaggy featuring Anitta and Maffio)	2024	—	—	—	—	—	—	—	—	—	—	—		Mr. W
"Posso Beijar Sua Boca?" (Leo Santana featuring Anitta)	2024	—	—	—	—	—	—	—	—	—	—	—	PMB: Platinum	Non-album single
"La Tóxica" (Alejandro Fernández featuring Anitta)	2024	—	—	—	—	—	1	—	—	—	—	—		Te Llevo en la Sangre
"Mi Amor" (Sam Feldt and Jvke featuring Anitta)	2024	—	—	—	—	—	—	—	—	—	—	—		Time After Time
"Saudade" (Hitmaker featuring Anitta)	2024	—	—	—	—	—	—	—	—	—	—	—		Non-album singles
"Get Up Bitch! Shake Ya Ass" (Victoria featuring Anitta)	2024	—	—	—	—	—	—	192	—	—	—	—		Non-album singles
"Alibi Pt. 2" (Sevdaliza, Pabllo Vittar and Yseult featuring Anitta)	2024	—	—	—	—	—	—	—	—	—	—	—		Non-album singles
"Paradise" (Fat Joe featuring Anitta and DJ Khaled)	2024	—	—	—	—	—	—	—	—	—	—	—		The World Changed For Me
"Malvado Favorito" (MC G15 and DG e Batidão Stronda featuring Anitta)	2024	—	—	—	—	—	—	—	—	—	—	—		Made in Caxias
"Looking for Love" (Alok featuring Anitta)	2024	—	—	—	—	—	—	—	—	—	—	—		Non-album single
"Balacobaco" (Baiana System featuring Alice Carvalho & Anitta)	2025	—	—	—	—	—	—	—	—	—	—	—		O Mundo Dá Voltas
"Tout gâcher" (by ZEG P featuring Anitta & Joé Dwèt Filé)	2025	—	—	—	—	—	—	—	—	—	—	—		Non-album single
"Conjuntão de Time" (with Papatinho & MC Cabelinho)	2026	—	—	—	—	—	—	—	—	—	—	—		MPC: Música Popular Carioca
"Parado no Bailão (Mundial)" (with MC L da Vinte, MC Gury & Neton Vega)	2026	—	—	—	—	—	—	—	—	—	—	—		Non-album single
"Benção" (Saulo Fernandes featuring Anitta)	2026	—	—	—	—	—	—	—	—	—	—	—		Benção
"Loca" (Anastasia featuring Anitta)	2026	—	—	—	—	—	—	—	—	—	—	—		Non-album single
"—" denotes a recording that did not chart or was not released in that territory.

=== Promotional singles ===
List of promotional singles, showing year released, chart positions and album name
Title	Year	Peak chart positions			Certifications	Album
Title	Year	BRA	POR	US Latin	Certifications	Album
"Jingle Dia das Mães" (with Furacão 2000)	2011	—	—	—		Non-album promotional single
"Proposta"	2012	—	—	—		Anitta
"Eu Vou Ficar"	2012	—	—	—		Anitta
"Tá na Mira"	2013	—	—	—		Anitta
"Totalmente Demais" (featuring Flávio Renegado or Duduzinho)	2015	—	—	—		Bang and Totalmente Demais - Nacional
"O Amor Tá Aí" (among Artists for Neymar Jr. Institute) (Note: "O Amor Tá Aí" features vocals from Neymar, Anitta, Alexandre Pires, Thiaguinho, Thaeme & Thiago, Wesley Safadão, Lucas Lucco, Karen K, Jane Santos, Claudia Leitte and Leo Santana)	2015	—	—	—		Non-album promotional single
"Goals"	2018	—	—	—		Solo
"Ugly" / "Fea" / "Feia"	2019	—	—	— (Note: "Ugly" did not enter the Billboard Hot Latin Songs chart, but peaked at number 8 on the Billboard Latin Digital Pop Song Sales chart.)		UglyDolls
"Pantera"	2019	—	—	—		Charlie's Angels
"Quem Tem Fome Tem Pressa" (among Artistas para Ação da Cidadania) (Note: "Quem Tem Fome Tem Pressa" features vocals from Alcione, Anitta, Caetano Veloso, Chico Buarque, Chitãozinho & Xororó, Criolo, Daniela Mercury, Djavan, Elza Soares, Emicida, Gilberto Gil, Gloria Groove, Ivete Sangalo, Karol Conká, Ludmilla, Luísa Sonza, Majur, Maria Bethânia, Mart'nália, Milton Nascimento, Mosquito, Nando Reis, Negra Li, Rogério Flausino, Teresa Cristina, Xand Avião, Xande de Pilares and Zélia Duncan)	2020	—	—	—		Non-album promotional singles
"Amor Real (Holiday Song)"	2020	—	—	—		Non-album promotional singles
"Furiosa"	2021	—	—	—		F9: The Fast Saga
"Tropa" (with Luck Muzik)	2022	—	—	—		Non-album promotional single
"Casi Casi"	2023	—	—	—	PMB: Platinum	Funk Generation: A Favela Love Story
"Used to Be"	2023	86	198	—		Funk Generation: A Favela Love Story
"Mil Vezes" (Remix) (with Melody)	2024	—	—	—		Non-album promotional single
"Fria" (solo or remix with Felix Jaehn)	2024	57	141	—	PMB: 2× Platinum	Funk Generation
"Savage Funk" (solo or remix with DJ Snake)	2024	32	83	—	PMB: 3× Platinum	Funk Generation
"Mania de Você" (Note: "Mania de Você" is the opening theme of the soap opera Mania de Você.)	2024	—	—	—	PMB: Gold	Non-album promotional single
"Larissa"	2025	—	—	—		Larissa: The Other Side of Anitta
"—" denotes a recording that did not chart or was not released in that territory.

== Other charted and certified songs ==
List of other charted songs, showing year released, with selected chart positions, certifications and album name
Title	Year	Peak chart positions			Certifications	Album
Title	Year	BRA	ARG	POR	Certifications	Album
"Atenção"	2015	—	—	—	AFP: Gold	Bang!
"Faz Gostoso" (Madonna featuring Anitta)	2019	— (Note: "Faz Gostoso" did not enter the Brasil Hot 100 Airplay chart, but peaked at number 49 on the Pro-Música Brasil Top 50 Streaming chart.)	—	40	PMB: Diamond	Madame X
"Brazilera" (Rauw Alejandro featuring Anitta)	2021	—	—	—	PMB: Gold	Vice Versa
"Que Rabão" (with YG, Papatinho and Kevin o Chris featuring Mr. Catra)	2022	24	—	19	PMB: Platinum; AFP: Gold	Versions of Me
"Lose Ya Breath"	2024	44	—	128	PMB: 2× Platinum	Funk Generation
"Meme"	2024	76	—	—		Funk Generation
"Love in Common"	2024	96	—	—	PMB: Platinum	Funk Generation
"Cria de Favela"	2024	81	—	—		Funk Generation
"Puta Cara"	2024	94	—	—		Funk Generation
"Sabana"	2024	90	—	—		Funk Generation
"Ahi" (with Sam Smith)	2024	63	—	130		Funk Generation
"Sei Que Tu Me Odeia" (with MC Danny and Hitmaker)	2024	4	—	11	AFP: Platinum	Ensaios da Anitta
"Pinterest"	2026	—	—	—		Equilibrium
"Desgraça"	2026	26	—	72		Equilibrium
"Mandinga" (with Marina Sena)	2026	48	—	172		Equilibrium
"Caminhador" (with Liniker)	2026	77	—	—		Equilibrium
"Deus Existe"" (with Ponto de Equilíbrio)	2026	90	—	—		Equilibrium
"Meia Noite" (with Los Brasileros)	2026	29	—	106		Equilibrium
"Sal Grosso"	2026	21	—	66		Equilibrium II
"Você Já Sabe"	2026	24	—	74		Equilibrium II
"Não Me Cutuca"	2026	32	—	66		Equilibrium II
"Feitiço"	2026	39	—	123		Equilibrium II
"Eu Não Sou Santa"	2026	58	—	163		Equilibrium II
"Ponta Do Pé"	2026	74	—	—		Equilibrium II
"Okê"	2026	80	—	—		Equilibrium II
"Pra Você Gostar De Mim"	2026	85	—	—		Equilibrium II
"Abre Caminho"	2026	87	—	—		Equilibrium II
"Tudo Isso"	2026	89	—	—		Equilibrium II
"Divino Sexual"	2026	99	—	—		Equilibrium II
"—" denotes a recording that did not chart or was not released in that territory.

== Guest appearances ==
List of other appearances, showing year released, other artist(s) credited and album name
Title	Year	Other artist(s)	Album
"Little Square UBitchU"	2019	Snoop Dogg	I Wanna Thank Me
"Boom Boom"	2019	Akon	El Negreeto
"Mother's Daughter X Boys Don't Cry"	2022	Miley Cyrus	Attention: Miley Live
"Te Amo (Em Caixa Alta)"	2022	Kiaz	Melhor Agora
"Calma Amiga"	2023	Pabllo Vittar	Noitada
"Balinha de Coração"	2023	Pabllo Vittar	Noitada
"Te Encontrei"	2023	MC Cabelinho	Little Love (Deluxe)
"Posturado e Calmo"	2024	L7nnon, LeodoKick, Ajaxx, HHR	Irrastreável
"Na Ausência de Ti (In Assenza di Te)"	2024	Tiago Iorc	Antes Que o Mundo Acabe
"Red Flag"	2024	Shenseea	Never Gets Late Here
"Woman Commando"	2024	Ayra Starr, Coco Jones	The Year I Turned 21
"Logun-Edé – Santo Menino Que Velho Respeita"	2024	Unidos da Tijuca, Ito Melodia	Sambas de Enredo Rio Carnaval 2025
"Illegal"	2025	PinkPantheress	Fancy Some More?

== Music videos ==
List of music videos, showing year released and director(s)
Title	Year	Director
"Menina Má"	2012	Galerão Filmes
"Meiga e Abusada"	2012	Blake Farber
"Show das Poderosas"	2013	Thiago Calviño
"Não Para"	2013	Eduardo Magalhães
"Zen"	2013	Thiago Calviño
"Blá Blá Blá" (Live)	2014	Raoni Carneiro
"Cobertor"	2014	Fred Ouro Preto
"No Meio da Torcida"	2014	Cris Winter
"Zen" (Spanish version)	2014	Thiago Calviño
"Na Batida"	2014	Fred Ouro Preto
"Ritmo Perfeito"	2014	Alex Miranda
"No Meu Talento"	2015	Alex Miranda
"Hoje Eu Sonhei Com Você"	2015	—N/a
"Blecaute (Slow Funk)"	2015	Kaue Mazon
"O Amor Tá Aí"	2015	Daniel Romão
"Deixa Ele Sofrer"	2015	Gustavo Camacho
"Bang"	2015	Bruno Ilogti
"A Menina Dança"	2015	Giovanni Bianco
"Essa Mina É Louca"	2016	Bruno Ilogti
"Com Que Roupa?"	2016	Paulo Fontenele
"Cravo e Canela"	2016	Bruno Ilogti
"Ginza" (Remix)	2016	Juan Pablo Valencia
"Faz Parte"	2016	Maurício Eça
"RG"	2016	Joana Mazzucchelli
"Sim ou Não"	2016	Jessy Terrero
"Sí o No"	2016	Jessy Terrero
"Loka"	2017	Anselmo Troncoso
"Você Partiu Meu Coração"	2017	Mess Santos, Phill Mendonça
"Switch"	2017	Rain Sky Films
"Paradinha"	2017	Bruno Ilogti
"Sua Cara"	2017	Bruno Ilogti
"Will I See You"	2017	Manuel Nogueira
"Is That for Me"	2017	Manuel Nogueira
"Downtown" (Spotify vertical video)	2017	Bruno Ilogti
"Downtown"	2017	Bruno Ilogti
"Vai Malandra"	2017	Terry Richardson
"Is That for Me" (Remix)	2018	Max Goodrich
"Machika"	2018	36 Grados
"Indecente"	2018	Bruno Ilogti
"Romance com Safadeza"	2018	Mess Santos
"Ao Vivo e as Cores"	2018	Joana Mazzucchelli
"Fica Tudo Bem"	2018	Breno Pineschi, Rafael Cazes
"Medicina"	2018	36 Grados
"Medicina" (Spotify vertical video)	2018	36 Grados
"Perdendo a Mão"	2018	Junior Bill
"Jacuzzi"	2018	João Papa
"Goals"	2018	João Papa
"Não Perco Meu Tempo"	2018	João Papa
"Veneno"	2018	João Papa
"Terremoto"	2019	João Papa
"Zé do Caroço"	2019	Gabriela Vedova
"Te Lo Dije"	2019	Daniel Duran
"Bola Rebola"	2019	Lula Carvalho
"Favela Chegou" (Live)	2019	Julio Loureiro
"R.I.P."	2019	Eif Rivera
"R.I.P." (Spotify vertical video)	2019	Eif Rivera
"Você Mentiu"	2019	Fernando Neumayer
"Sin Miedo"	2019	Lula Carvalho
"Tu y Yo"	2019	Bruno Ilogti
"Get to Know Me"	2019	João Papa
"Rosa"	2019	Bruno Ilogti
"Juego"	2019	João Papa
"Atencíon"	2019	João Papa
"Onda Diferente"	2019	Lula Carvalho
"Banana"	2019	Lula Carvalho
"Poquito"	2019	Pedro Molinos
"Poquito" (Spotify vertical video)	2019	Pedro Molinos
"Pa' Lante"	2019	Daniel Duran
"Make It Hot"	2019	Jovan Todorović
"Muito Calor"	2019	Nuno Gomes
"Contatinho" (Live)	2019	Julio Loureiro
"Complicado"	2019	Leo Ferraz
"eXplosion"	2019	will.I.am, Pasha Shapiro, Ernst Weber
"Fuego"	2019	Colin Tilley
"Some Que Ele Vem Atrás" (Live)	2019	Pedro Secchin
"Combatchy"	2019	Nixon Freire
"Meu Mel"	2019	Phill Mendonça
"Até o Céu"	2019	Og Cruz
"Jogação"	2020	Phill Mendonça
"Contando Lunares (Remix)"	2020	Golden Beetle Films
"Rave de Favela"	2020	George Nienhuis
"Desce Pro Play (Pa Pa Pa)"	2020	Felipe Britto
"Tócame"	2020	Giovanni Bianco
"Paloma"	2020	Matteo Stefani, Andrea Biscaro
"Ta com o Papato"	2020	Daniel Levenhagem
"Me Gusta"	2020	Daniel Russell
"Modo Turbo"	2020	Alaska
"Loco"	2021	Daniel Levenhagem
"Tô Preocupada (Calma Amiga)"	2021	Anitta
"Mi Niña (Remix)"	2021	Charlie Nelson
"Girl from Rio"	2021	Giovanni Bianco
"Girl from Rio (Remix)"	2021	Giovanni Bianco
"Mon soleil"	2021	Alexinho Mougeolle
"Un Altro Ballo"	2021	Mauro Russo
"Todo o Nada"	2021	La Familia
"SexToU"	2021	Romulo Menescal, Vinicius Olivo
"Faking Love"	2021	Bradley & Pablo
"Envolver"	2021	Anitta
"Suéltate"	2021	Galen Hooks
"No Chão Novinha"	2021	Fernando Moraes
"Boys Don't Cry"	2022	Anitta, Christian Breslauer
"Envolver (Remix)"	2022	Paloma Valencia
"Que Vamo' Hacer"	2022	Fernando Moraes
"First Class"	2022	Jack Begert
"Dançarina (Remix)"	2022	Marioo
"Tropa"	2022	Christian Breslauer
"La Loto"	2022	Diego Peskins, Daniel Duran
"No Más"	2022	Jackson Tisi
"Tudo Nosso"	2022	Paladino
"Gata"	2022	Giovanni Bianco
"El Que Espera"	2022	Mike Ho
"Lobby"	2022	Arrad
"Simply the Best"	2022	will.i.am, Anitta
"Proibidona" (Live)	2023	Samy Elia
"Mais Uma"	2023	Thiago Eva
"Pilantra"	2023	Pedro Tofani
"Nu"	2023	João Papa
"Vai Vendo"	2023	João Papa
"Capitán"	2023	Fabricio Jiménez
"24 Horas"	2023	Martin Escriche
"Funk Rave"	2023	Anitta
"Casi Casi"	2023	Anitta
"Used to Be"	2023	Anitta
"Back for More"	2023	Mother
"Mil Veces"	2023	Jackson Tisi
"Monstrão"	2023	Nuno Gomes
"Bellakeo"	2023	Willy Rodríguez
"Joga Pra Lua"	2023	Anitta
"Faldas y Gistros"	2024	Fernando Lugo
"Bota Niña"	2024	Didi Domench
"Double Team"	2024	Sam Hayes
"Um Por Cento" (Live)	2024	Dudu Borges
"Grip"	2024	Ricardo Souza
"Funk Generation"	2024	Anitta, Marcelo Jarosz
"Peligrosa"	2024	Fernando Lugo
"Aceita"	2024	João Wainer, Ricardo Souza
"La Toxica"	2024	Narsés
"Alegria"	2024	Maria Sosa Betancor
"Get Up Bitch! Shake Ya Ass"	2024	Simone Bozzelli
"Paradise"	2024	Eif Rivera
"Soltera"	2024	Shakira
"São Paulo"	2024	Freeka Tet
"Looking for Love"	2024	Anitta

== See also ==
- Anitta Awards
- Anitta Live Performances
