= Turnê Show das Poderosas =

2013–14 concert tour by Anitta

- Debut tour by Anitta
- Location: South America • North America • Europe
- Associated album: Anitta
- Start date: June 6, 2013 (Rio de Janeiro)
- End date: June 13, 2014 (Patos de Minas)
- Legs: 3
- No. of shows: 2 in Europe; 2 in North America; 165 in South America; 169 in total

Anitta concert chronology
- Turnê Show das Poderosas (2013–2014); Turnê Meu Lugar (2014–2016)

Turnê Show das Poderosas was the first concert tour of the Brazilian singer Anitta. The tour began on June 6, 2013, in Rio de Janeiro, Brazil. At the premiere of the first tour was in Barra da Tijuca in Rio. The tour dates happened in nightclubs and parties in Brazil.

== About the tour ==
The mission of those who do not want to miss the biggest production of the powerful National Pop was not easy. Besides spending more than 2 hours in traffic to get to the site, enter the house was also a challenge: Before 2:00 am that Friday, the venue Music bar was already crowded with an audience of over 6,500 people. Backstage at the show, do not speak of anything else, everyone commented on the success of public and lack of organization in traffic around the bar Music. In addition to the tickets offered for sale, the staff of the artist received many requests for invitations to the show that failed to meet everyone. Among the privileged were much of the Rio press, many global Wolf Maya came to the cabin of the artist with his class a few minutes after starting the show and many other celebrities were honoring the artist. While DJs warmed the public, a friendly and spontaneous artist received journalists, guests, fans and friends in the backstage the show and shared details of his new tour, which has two formats show. Besides the overproduction of Show das Poderosas Tour, The Club Anitta, with reduced staff and structure to meet public spaces and smaller.

== Setlist ==
Setlist
1. "Show das Poderosas"
2. "Proposta"
3. "Cachorro Eu Tenho Em Casa"
4. "Eu Vou Ficar"
5. Medley: "I Kissed a Girl" (cover de Katy Perry) / "Get Lucky" (cover de Daft Punk)
6. "Achei"
7. "Príncipe de Vento"
8. Medley: "Baba" (cover de Kelly Key) / "Adultério"(cover de Mr. Catra) / "Tô Nem Aí" (cover de Luka)
9. Medley: "Toda Forma de Amor"(cover de Lulu Santos) / "Descobridor dos Sete Mares" (cover de Tim Maia) / "Não Quero Dinheiro" (cover de Tim Maia)
10. "Meiga e Abusada"
11. "Fica Só Olhando"
12. "Tá na Mira"
13. Interlude: "Run the World (Girls)" (Contém trechos de "Show das Poderosas)"
14. Medley: "Um Anjo do Céu" (cover de Natiruts) / "Me Namora" (cover de Edu Ribeiro) / "Som do Coração" / "Quando Você Passa (Turuturu)" (cover de Sandy & Junior)
15. "Zen"
16. Medley Axé: "Taj Mahal" (cover de Jorge Ben Jor) / "Céu da Boca" (cover de Ivete Sangalo) / "Beijar na Boca" (cover de Claudia Leitte) / "Anna Júlia" (cover de Los Hermanos)
17. "Não Para"
18. "Pretin" (cover de Flora Matos)
19. "Eu Sou Assim"
20. Medley Funk": "Pumba la Bumba" (cover de MC Magrinho) / "Fala Mal de Mim" (cover de Ludmilla) / "Ai Caralho Que Mina Maluca" (cover de MC Magrinho) / "Novinha Safadinha " (cover de MC Tarapi) / "Fama de Putona"(cover de Tati Quebra-Barraco) / "Senta Essa Bunda No Chão" (cover de Gibi) / "Ela É Top" (cover de MC Bola) / "Hoje Eu Quero Trair" (cover de Mr. Jamaica) / "Eu Adoro, Eu Me Amarro" (cover de Nego do Borel) / "Onde Come Um Come Dois" (cover de MC Fernandinho)
21. "Menina Má"
22. "Não Para" (Reprise)
23. "Show das Poderosas" (Reprise)

== Shows ==
Date	City	Country	Venue
South America
June 6, 2013	Rio de Janeiro	Brazil	Barra Music
June 7, 2013	Brasília	Brazil	ASFUB
June 7, 2013	Brasília	Brazil	Victora Haus
June 8, 2013	Itaipava	Brazil	Nix Club
June 8, 2013	Vassouras	Brazil	Chocheiras Hall
June 12, 2013	Duque de Caxias	Brazil	Invicta
June 14, 2013	Niterói	Brazil	Bar do Meio
June 14, 2013	Niterói	Brazil	Private Party
June 15, 2013	Rio de Janeiro	Brazil	Jacarepaguá Tênis Clube
June 15, 2013	Rio de Janeiro	Brazil	Rio Samba
June 16, 2013	Santos	Brazil	Fantastic Choppeira
June 19, 2013	São Paulo	Brazil	Vale do Anhangabaú (FIFA Confederations Cup)
June 19, 2013	São Paulo	Brazil	Vila Olímpia
June 21, 2013	Rio de Janeiro	Brazil	Rio Samba
June 22, 2013	Rio de Janeiro	Brazil	Fundição Progresso
June 22, 2013	Rio de Janeiro	Brazil	Arena Morro da Urca (FIFA Confederations Cup)
June 23, 2013	Macaé	Brazil	Quenzas Hall
June 28, 2013	Rio de Janeiro	Brazil	Gres Acadêmicos do Salgueiro
June 29, 2013	Rio de Janeiro	Brazil	Sítio Moa
June 29, 2013	Rio de Janeiro	Brazil	Casa do Marinheiro
June 29, 2013	Rio de Janeiro	Brazil	Estação Rio Globo
June 30, 2013	Belém	Brazil	Element Club
July 1, 2013	Salvador	Brazil	Barra Hall
July 4, 2013	Campos dos Goytacazes	Brazil	Fundação Rural de Campos
July 5, 2013	Rio de Janeiro	Brazil	Festa Fechada
July 6, 2013	Conselheiro Lafaiete	Brazil	Espaço Iels
July 7, 2013	Volta Redonda	Brazil	Ilha de São João (Festival da Alegria da FM o dia)
July 8, 2013	Santos	Brazil	Liquid Love
July 11, 2013	São Gonçalo	Brazil	I9 Music
July 12, 2013	Vitória	Brazil	LHA Shows M.I.S.S.A.
July 12, 2013	Cariacica	Brazil	Matrix Music Hall
July 13, 2013	São Paulo	Brazil	Via Marques
July 15, 2013	São Gonçalo	Brazil	I9 Music
July 16, 2013	São Paulo	Brazil	Royal Club
July 18, 2013	Brasília	Brazil	Villa Mix
July 19, 2013	São Luís	Brazil	WP Rio Poty
July 20, 2013	Saquarema	Brazil	Via Dubai
July 21, 2013	Rio de Janeiro	Brazil	Pavunense Futebol Clube
July 21, 2013	Seropédica	Brazil	Parque de Eventos
July 22, 2013	Porto Seguro	Brazil	Arena Axé Moi
July 23, 2013	São Paulo	Brazil	Royal Club
July 25, 2013	Rio de Janeiro	Brazil	Olimpo
July 27, 2013	Rio de Janeiro	Brazil	Vivo Rio
July 28, 2013	Rio de Janeiro	Brazil	GRES Caprichosos de Pilares
July 30, 2013	São Paulo	Brazil	Royal Club
July 31, 2013	Porto Alegre	Brazil	Provocateur
August 3, 2013	Recife	Brazil	Arena Pernambuco
August 4, 2013	João Pessoa	Brazil	Forrock
August 8, 2013	Rio de Janeiro	Brazil	Private Party
August 9, 2013	Juiz de Fora	Brazil	La Rocca
August 10, 2013	Uberlândia	Brazil	Castelli Master e Shopping Park
August 11, 2013	São Paulo	Brazil	Espaço das Américas
August 14, 2013	Belo Horizonte	Brazil	Mix Garden
August 15, 2013	Joinville	Brazil	Bigbowlling
August 16, 2013	Criciúma	Brazil	Germano Riggo
August 17, 2013	Tubarão	Brazil	Hangar Eventos
August 18, 2013	Balneário Camboriú	Brazil	WS Brazil
August 23, 2013	Macapá	Brazil	Ceta Ecotel
August 24, 2013	Goiânia	Brazil	Espaço Goiás
August 25, 2013	Rio de Janeiro	Brazil	GRES Portela
August 25, 2013	São João de Meriti	Brazil	Parque de Eventos de São João de Meriti
August 29, 2013	Rio de Janeiro	Brazil	Via Show
August 30, 2013	Niterói	Brazil	Espaço Cantareira
August 31, 2013	Salvador	Brazil	Café Hall
September 4, 2013	Manaus	Brazil	Studio 5
September 6, 2013	Belo Horizonte	Brazil	Galopeira
September 7, 2013	Guarapari	Brazil	Multiplace Mais
September 8, 2013	Ribeirão Pires	Brazil	Encasa Music Hall
September 12, 2013	São Paulo	Brazil	Carioca Club Interlagos
September 14, 2013	Rio de Janeiro	Brazil	Fundição Progresso
September 15, 2013	Volta Redonda	Brazil	Porão Hall
September 18, 2013	Rio de Janeiro	Brazil	West Show
September 19, 2013	Juazeiro do Norte	Brazil	Hall
September 20, 2013	Fortaleza	Brazil	Music Fortaleza
September 21, 2013	Natal	Brazil	Praia Devassa
September 22, 2013	Aracaju	Brazil	Miami Hall
September 27, 2013	Campina Grande	Brazil	Via Appia Festa e Eventos
September 28, 2013	Conceição de Macabu	Brazil	Club do Bosque
North America
September 30, 2013	Orlando	United States	Hall
September 30, 2013	Miami	United States	Hall
South America
October 4, 2013	Porto Alegre	Brazil	Pepsi on Stage
October 5, 2013	Novo Hamburgo	Brazil	FENAC
October 5, 2013	Estrela	Brazil	Lupus Land
October 6, 2013	Pelotas	Brazil	Centro de Eventos Fena Doce
October 6, 2013	Rio Grande	Brazil	Sociedade Amigos do Cassino
October 8, 2013	São Paulo	Brazil	Royal Club
October 10, 2013	Brasília	Brazil	Villa Mix
October 11, 2013	Rio de Janeiro	Brazil	Citibank Hall
October 12, 2013	Rio de Janeiro	Brazil	Citibank Hall
October 13, 2013	Rio de Janeiro	Brazil	Citibank Hall
October 16, 2013	São Paulo	Brazil	Villa Mix
October 17, 2013	Fernandópolis	Brazil	Bartõshow
October 18, 2013	São Carlos	Brazil	Banana Brasil
October 19, 2013	Teresópolis	Brazil	Club Comary
October 25, 2013	Itu	Brazil	Anzu Club
October 26, 2013	São Paulo	Brazil	Rosas de Ouro
October 26, 2013	São Paulo	Brazil	Santa Aldeia
October 27, 2013	Maricá	Brazil	Esporte Club Maricá
October 31, 2013	Rio de Janeiro	Brazil	Olimpo
November 2, 2013	Resplendor	Brazil	Parque de Exposições de Resplendor
November 6, 2013	Pouso Alegre	Brazil	Hall
November 7, 2013	João Monlevade	Brazil	Hall
November 8, 2013	Ubá	Brazil	Parque de Exposições
November 9, 2013	Leopoldina	Brazil	Parque de Exposições Leopoldina
November 10, 2013	Rio de Janeiro	Brazil	Praça da Apoteose (Maratona Da Alegria FM O Dia)
November 26, 2013	São Paulo	Brazil	Citibank Hall
November 29, 2013	Três Rios	Brazil	Estádio do Entrerriense
December 1, 2013	Cachoeiro de Itapemirim	Brazil	Unimed Hall (Shopping Sul)
December 4, 2013	Ponta Grossa	Brazil	München Fest
December 5, 2013	Curitiba	Brazil	WS Brasil
December 6, 2013	Balneário Camboriú	Brazil	WS Brasil
December 7, 2013	Rio de Janeiro	Brazil	Private Party
December 8, 2013	Jandira	Brazil	Festa das Nações
December 12, 2013	Itaí	Brazil	Festa do Peão
December 14, 2013	Campo Grande	Brazil	Parque do Peão
December 17, 2013	Rio de Janeiro	Brazil	Private Party
December 18, 2013	Rio de Janeiro	Brazil	Private Party
December 21, 2013	São João del Rei	Brazil	Parque de Exposições
December 27, 2013	Recife	Brazil	Chevrolet Hall
December 29, 2013	Rio de Janeiro	Brazil	Marina da Glória
December 31, 2013	Maceió	Brazil	Praia da Jatiúca (Réveillon Absoluto)
January 4, 2014	Guarujá	Brazil	Hotel Jequitimar
January 10, 2014	Cuiabá	Brazil	Pavilhão do Parque de Exposições da ACRIMAT
January 14, 2014	São João da Barra	Brazil	Canto do Meio - Atafona
February 1, 2014	Guarapari	Brazil	Multiplace mais
February 7, 2014	Volta Redonda	Brazil	Ginásio da PET
February 8, 2014	Praia do Farol de São Thomé	Brazil	Boate Summer
February 9, 2014	Itaipava	Brazil	Tamboatá
February 15, 2014	Rio de Janeiro	Brazil	HSBC Arena
February 22, 2014	São Paulo	Brazil	Private Party
February 22, 2014	Ubatuba	Brazil	Grito Folia Ubatuba
February 23, 2014	Contagem	Brazil	Cinco
February 24, 2014	São Gonçalo	Brazil	I9 Music
February 26, 2014	Chácara Santo Antônio	Brazil	Brooks Bar
February 27, 2014	Salvador	Brazil	Camarote Band
February 28, 2014	Rio de Janeiro	Brazil	Camarote Guanabara
March 1, 2014	Rio de Janeiro	Brazil	Citibank Hall
March 1, 2014	Abaeté	Brazil	Campo do Atlético
March 2, 2014	Ouro Preto	Brazil	República Maracangalha
March 3, 2014	Muzambinho	Brazil	Parque de Exposições
March 4, 2014	Lambari	Brazil	Campo das Águas
March 5, 2014	Florianópolis	Brazil	Carnaval Skol Floripa
April 5, 2014	Rio de Janeiro	Brazil	Praça da Apoteose (Rio Verão Vestival)
April 6, 2014	Rio de Janeiro	Brazil	021
April 10, 2014	Curitiba	Brazil	WS Brasil
April 11, 2014	Guarapuava	Brazil	Centro de Convenções
April 12, 2014	Rio das Ostras	Brazil	Camping Costa Azul
April 17, 2014	Brasília	Brazil	Vila Mix
April 24, 2014	Goiânia	Brazil	CMB Fashion
April 25, 2014	Santa Fé de Goiás	Brazil	Hall
April 26, 2014	Trajano de Moraes	Brazil	Hall
April 27, 2014	Rio de Janeiro	Brazil	Rio Water Planet
April 30, 2014	Rio de Janeiro	Brazil	La Isla
May 4, 2014	Rio de Janeiro	Brazil	Hall
May 5, 2014	Lagoa Formosa	Brazil	Parque de Exposições
May 9, 2014	São Gonçalo	Brazil	I9 Music
May 10, 2014	Uberlândia	Brazil	Triangulo Music
May 11, 2014	Feira de Santana	Brazil	Parque de Exposições João Martins da Silva
May 16, 2014	Porto Alegre	Brazil	Provocateur
May 21, 2014	Rio de Janeiro	Brazil	Tradição G.R.E.S.
Europe
May 23, 2014	Barcelona	Spain	Hall
May 24, 2014	Madrid	Spain	Hall
South America
May 29, 2014	Conselheiro Lafaiete	Brazil	Boate Inboxx
May 30, 2014	Belo Horizonte	Brazil	Boate GIS
May 31, 2014	Volta Grande	Brazil	Parque de Exposições de Volta Grande
June 1, 2014	Barbacena	Brazil	Observa Torium
June 6, 2014	São Paulo	Brazil	Private Party
June 11, 2014	Barra do Piraí	Brazil	Royal
June 13, 2014	Patos de Minas	Brazil	Parque Sebastião Alves do Nascimento
