= Tócame (song) =

2020 single by Anitta featuring Arcángel and De La Ghetto

Single by Anitta featuring Arcángel & De La Ghetto
- Released: July 10, 2020
- Length: 2:46
- Label: Warner
- Songwriter(s): Andrés Torres; Anitta; Arcangel; De La Ghetto; Mauricio Rengifo; Ryan Tedder
- Producer(s): Andrés Torres; Mauricio Rengifo; Ryan Tedder

Anitta singles chronology
"Paloma" (2020)	"Tócame" (2020)	"Tá com o Papato" (2020)

Arcángel singles chronology
"Pirueta" (2020)	"Tócame" (2020)	"No Hay Amor" (2020)

De La Ghetto singles chronology
"Sigo Fresh (Remix)" (2020)	"Tócame" (2020)	"Mala" (2020)

Music video
- "Tócame" on YouTube

"Tócame" is a song by Brazilian singer Anitta, released through Warner Records on July 10, 2020. The track features American singers Arcángel and De La Ghetto.

== Background ==
On June 2, 2020, an Asian website leaked the alleged cover and release date of the single, titled "Tócame", which would be released on June 12. On July 2, Anitta officially released the cover and release date.

== Live performances ==
Anitta performed the song for the first time on July 11, 2020, at the Altas Horas. On August 21, she performed at The Late Late Show with James Corden.

== Music video ==
The music video was directed by Giovanni Bianco, with his scenes being recorded using drones in order to avoid contact between people due to the pandemic of COVID-19. The clip features the participation of the singer's ex-boyfriend, Gui Araújo, anonymous dancing in their apartments and slabs, in addition to the guest artists.

== Charts ==
Chart performance for "Tócame"
Chart (2020)	Peak position
Colombia (Monitor Latino)	16
Colombia (National-Report)	19
Mexico (Monitor Latino)	7
Mexico Airplay (Billboard)	13
Mexico Pop Espanol Airplay (Billboard)	1
Portugal (AFP)	94
US Latin Digital Song Sales	9

== Certifications and sales ==
Certifications for "Tócame"
Region	Certification	Certified units/sales
Brazil (Pro-Música Brasil)	2× Platinum	160,000^{‡}
Portugal (AFP)	Gold	5,000^{‡}
^{‡} Sales+streaming figures based on certification alone.
