= Serginho Groisman =

Brazilian television presenter and journalist

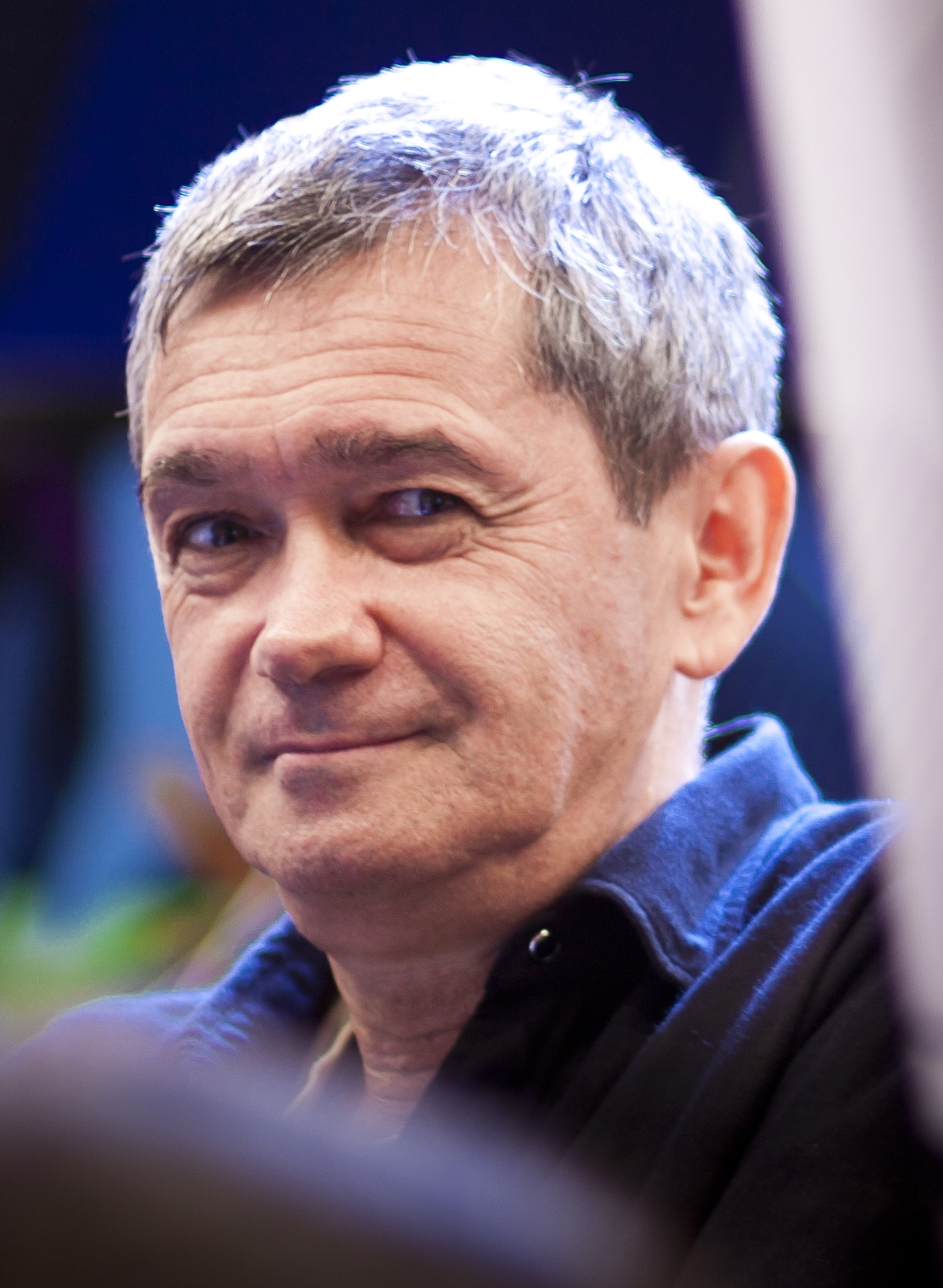
- Born: Sérgio Groisman; June 29, 1950 (age 76); São Paulo, Brazil
- Occupations: Television presenter Journalist
- Website: Serginho Groisman

Sérgio Groisman, best known as Serginho Groisman (Portuguese: [sɛʁˈʒĩɲu ˈɡɾojzmɐ̃] born June 29, 1950), is a Brazilian television presenter and journalist. He is the host of the talk shows Altas Horas on Rede Globo and Tempos de Escola on Canal Futura.

== Personal life ==
Serginho is Jewish. His father was from Romania, and his mother was born in Poland. His great-grandparents and some of his aunts died in a Nazi concentration camp.
