= Anastasia (singer) =

Greek singer (born 2003)

Background information
- Born: Αναστασία Δημητρά; 18 May 2003 (age 23); Megara, Greece
- Genres: Pop; Pop-folk; Laïkó
- Occupation: Singer
- Instrument: Vocals
- Years active: 2021–present
- Label: Golden Records

Anastasia (Greek: Αναστασία Δημητρά; born 18 May 2003), also known by her full name Anastasia Dimitra, is a Greek singer.

She rose to prominence in 2022 when her single Amarties went viral on TikTok and reached the top of YouTube's music chart in Greece. Its official music video has surpassed 34 million views on YouTube, and later that year she signed with Golden Records. Amarties became the first folk song to receive Diamond certification in the history of the modern Greek recording industry. The same year, Anastasia won the Best New Artist award at the MAD Video Music Awards, Greece's leading music awards ceremony.

In 2023, she released her debut studio album Efhi, followed by San Oneiro in 2025. On 10 July 2026, she released the single Loca, a collaboration with Brazilian singer Anitta.

== Discography ==
=== Studio albums ===
- Efhi (2023)
- San Oneiro (2025)

=== Extended plays ===
- Amarties (2022)
- O,ti M' Aresi (2023)

=== Singles ===
Single	Year	Spotify Greece	Spotify Cyprus
Amarties	2022	2	2
Ligo Ligo	2022	4	19
Mystiko	2022	6	28
An Eisai Ena Asteri	2022	101	—
Mi Milas	2023	14	43
Simadi	2023	17	15
Siga To Prama	2024	3	4
Allo (with Enisa)	2024	6	2
Agapi Mou Me Dioxneis	2024	42	52
Bam	2025	36	63

== Awards and nominations ==
Year	Award	Category	Work	Result
2022	MAD Video Music Awards	Best New Artist	Amarties	Won
2024	MAD Video Music Awards	Album of the Year	Efhi	Won
2024	MAD Video Music Awards	Best Greek Dance Video	Simadi	Won
