= Envolver =

2021 single by Anitta

Single by Anitta

from the album Versions of Me
- Language: Spanish
- Released: 11 November 2021
- Genre: Reggaeton
- Length: 3:13
- Label: Warner
- Songwriters: Larissa de Macedo Machado; Cristian Andrés Salazar; Freddy Montalvo; José Carlos Cruz; Julio Manuel Gonzalez Tavarez
- Producer: Subelo NEO

Anitta singles chronology
"Faking Love" (2021)	"Envolver" (2021)	"No Chão Novinha" (2021)

Music video
- "Envolver" on YouTube

"Envolver" (Note: Spanish for "to involve".) is a song by Brazilian singer Anitta from her fifth studio album Versions of Me. It was released as the fourth single from the album through Warner Records on 11 November 2021. "Envolver" is a reggaeton song that hints to desiring a sexual relationship in a casual way, the lyrics incorporate several sexual innuendos and double entendres. A remix of the song featuring American singer Justin Quiles was released on 17 February 2022.

The song and its music video, self-directed by Anitta, went viral in March 2022, after it gained popularity on TikTok, where its "booty-grinding" dance became one of the most replicated. "Envolver" broke a string of records, including the first solo Latin song to reach the top of the Spotify Global Daily chart, which earned Anitta an entry in the Guinness Book of World Records.

Commercially, the song achieved international success in Latin America and became Anitta's most charted song to date. With "Envolver", Anitta had her highest entries on the Billboard Global 200 and Billboard Global Excl. U.S., at numbers two and one, respectively. The song also reached number 70 on the Billboard Hot 100 chart issue dated April 16, 2022, becoming Anitta's highest career peak, and peaked at number one in the Billboard Brazil Songs chart.

In August 2022, Rolling Stone named "Envolver" the 81st best reggaeton song of all time. That same month, the song won the MTV Video Music Award for Best Latin, making her the first Brazilian solo artist to win in the awards' history.

== Background ==
On 8 November 2021, Anitta released a teaser of the song through her social media. On the following days, the single cover art and a small snippet of the music video were also revealed. The self-directed music video of "Envolver" was released along with the song on November 11. It features Anitta dancing sensually with Moroccan dancer and model Ayoub Mutanda.

A remix featuring American singer Justin Quiles was released on February 17, 2022.

== Commercial performance ==
Following its release, "Envolver" broke a string of records. It became the first Latin solo song to reach the top position of the Spotify Global Daily chart, which earned Anitta an entry in the Guinness Book of World Records. It was noted that other Latin songs that had previously reached the number one position ("Despacito", "Mi Gente", "Dákiti", "Havana" and "Señorita") were all collaborations between two or more artists.

"Envolver" also became the most streamed song in a single-day in Spotify in 2022 (7.278 million streams) at the time, biggest streaming day for a female Latin song, as well as the first song by a Brazilian artist to reach the top of the Spotify Global Daily chart. Additionally it also became the first song ever to place inside the top 50 of all Latin countries on Spotify. It also broke the record for most one-day streams in Brazil with over 4.5 million plays, a record that was previously held by herself with "Vai Malandra" (2.1 million streams).

Commercially, the song achieved international success and became Anitta's most charted song to date. "Envolver" became Anitta's highest entries on the Billboard Global 200 and Billboard Global Excl. U.S., at numbers two and one, respectively. The song also reached number 70 on the Billboard Hot 100 chart issue dated 16 April 2022, becoming Anitta's second entry overall on the chart, first entry as a soloist and her highest career peak at the time.

"Envolver" also peaked at number one in the Billboard Brazil Songs chart, and number six on Billboard's Hot Latin Songs chart. The song has also peaked within the top ten in the charts of several countries, such as Bolivia, Chile, Colombia, Ecuador, Dominican Republic, Honduras, Mexico, Paraguay, Panama, Peru, Portugal and Puerto Rico, and debuted in the charts of twenty others, including Argentina, Canada, El Salvador, France, Greece, Ireland, Luxembourg, Netherlands, Italy, Spain and Switzerland.

Select year-end rankings
Publication	List	Rank	Ref.
Billboard	The 100 Best Songs of 2022: Staff List	89	
Billboard	Best Performance of the VMAs	3	
Cosmopolitan	Sexiest Music Videos of all time	N/A	
¡Hola!	15 Latin Hits That Made Us Dance and Sing in 2022	N/A	
Infobae	The 100 Best Songs to Receive New Year 2023	19	
Jefebet	Sexiest Latin Music Videos of 2022	5	
Latina	Top 20 Songs of 2022	11	
Los Angeles Times	The 100 Best Songs of 2022	14	
Rolling Stone	100 Greatest Reggaeton Songs of All Time	81	
The Lawton Constitution	The 100 Best Songs of 2022	14	
Tidal	Best Reggaeton Song of 2021	31	
Tidal	Best Latin Song of 2022	7	
Tidal	Best Songs of 2022	57	
UPROXX	The Best Songs of 2022	N/A	
USA Today	Best Performance of the VMAs	4	

== Live performances and Accolades ==
Anitta first performed the song on her Carnatal show on 12 December 2021. The song was performed multiple other times after that, including Miley's New Year's Eve Party on 1 January 2022. On 24 February 2022, Anitta performed the remix version of "Envolver" with Justin Quiles for the first time on Premio Lo Nuestro 2022. On 15 and 22 April 2022, the song was included in the setlist for the singer's performance on the main stage at Coachella. On June 21, 2022, she performed the song during her European tour, which included countries such as Spain, Portugal, France, Ireland, Denmark, Sweden, Netherlands, Switzerland, and Italy. On 25 June 2022, Anitta performed the song for the first time on the French television show Quotidien. On 28 August 2022, Anitta performed the song at the 2022 MTV Video Music Awards. On 4 November 2022, she performed at the biggest music award ceremony in Spain, the Los 40 Music Awards. On 9 November 2022, Anitta performed at the Rihanna fashion show, Savage x Fenty Show Vol.4 was released on Amazon Prime Video. On 17 November 2022, Anitta performed "Envolver" at the Latin Grammy Awards. On 20 November 2022, she made another performance at the American Music Awards. On 15 December 2022, in an exclusive show for Amazon Music Live, the singer performed various songs, which included "Envolver". On 10 July 2023, the singer performed again at the 2023 UEFA Champions League final kick off show by Pepsi, at the Atatürk Olympic Stadium in Istanbul, Turkey, for an audience of 71,412, with a broadcast reaching over 700 million people worldwide.

Year presented, name of the award ceremony, category, and result of nomination
Year	Award ceremony	Category	Result	Ref.
2022	Área VIP Award	Hit of the Year	Nominated	
2022	Capricho Awards	Hit of the Year	Won	
2022	CONTIGO! Online Award	Song of the Year	Nominated	
2022	Latin Grammy Awards	Record of the Year	Nominated	
2022	Latin Grammy Awards	Best Reggaeton Performance	Nominated	
2022	Latino Show Music Awards	Song of the Year	Nominated	
2022	Latino Show Music Awards	TikTok Viral Song	Nominated	
2022	Latino Show Music Awards	Videoclip of the Year	Won	
2022	Los 40 Music Awards	Best Latin Collaboration	Nominated	
2022	MTV Millennial Awards	Viral Anthem	Nominated	
2022	MTV Millennial Awards	Viral Bomb	Won	
2022	MTV Millennial Awards Brazil	Global Hit	Nominated	
2022	MTV Millennial Awards Brazil	Choreography	Nominated	
2022	MTV Video Music Awards	Best Latin	Won	
2022	Multishow Brazilian Music Awards	Song of the Year	Won	
2022	Multishow Brazilian Music Awards	Hit of the Year	Nominated	
2022	Multishow Brazilian Music Awards	Best Music Video TVZ	Nominated	
2022	NRJ Music Awards	International Song of the Year	Nominated	
2022	Premios Juventud	The Catchiest Song	Nominated	
2022	Premios Juventud	The Hottest Choreography	Won	
2022	Premios Juventud	Best Social Dance Challenge	Nominated	
2022	Premios Juventud	Viral Track of the Year	Nominated	
2022	Prêmios Likes Brasil	Streaming Trophy to the Legend	Won	
2022	Premios Musa	Internacional Latin Song of the Year	Nominated	
2022	Prêmios Tu Música Urbana	Song of the Year	Nominated	
2022	SEC Awards	Song of the Year	Nominated	
2022	Splash Awards	Hit of the Year	Won	
2022	The Pop Hub Awards	Najlepsza Choreografia (Best Choreography)	Nominated	
2022	TikTok Awards	A Hit is a Hit	Nominated	
2022	Viva Latino - Spotify	Favorite Song of 2022	Won	
2022	WME Awards	Latin Song	Won	
2023	iHeartRadio Music Awards	Best Music Video	Nominated	
2023	iHeartRadio Music Awards	TikTok Bop of the Year	Nominated	
2023	Latin American Music Awards	Best Urban Song	Nominated	
2023	Premios Lo Nuestro	Song of the Year	Nominated	
2023	Premios Lo Nuestro	Pop-Urban Song of the Year	Nominated	
2023	Premios Lo Nuestro	Urban - Song of the Year	Nominated	
2023	Premios Lo Nuestro	Remix of the Year	Nominated	
2023	SESAC Latina Music Awards	Song of the Year Pop/Latin Rhythm	Won	
2023	Top 50 Music Awards	Best Song	Nominated	

=== World Records ===
Publication	Year	World record	Record holder	Ref.
Guinness World Records	2022	First solo Latin artist to reach No.1 on Spotify	Anitta	
Guinness World Records	2022	First female solo artist to win Best Latin at the MTV Video Music Awards	Anitta	

== Charts ==
=== Weekly charts ===
2021–2022 weekly chart performance for "Envolver"
Chart (2021–2022)	Peak position
Argentina Hot 100 (Billboard)	13
Belgium (Ultratop 50 Wallonia)	36
Bolivia (Billboard)	2
Brazil (Billboard)	1
Canada Hot 100 (Billboard)	100
Chile (Billboard)	11
Colombia (Billboard)	9
Costa Rica Streaming (FONOTICA)	8
Dominican Republic Streaming (SodinPro)	6
Ecuador (Billboard)	3
France (SNEP)	53
Global 200 (Billboard)	2
Greece International (IFPI)	20
Ireland (IRMA)	22
Italy (FIMI)	43
Lithuania (AGATA)	18
Luxembourg (Billboard)	12
Mexico (Billboard)	3
Mexico Airplay (Billboard)	2
Mexico Español Airplay (Billboard)	1
Netherlands (Single Tip)	11
Peru (Billboard)	2
Peru Streaming (UNIMPRO)	20
Portugal (AFP)	2
Spain (Promusicae)	13
Sweden Heatseeker (Sverigetopplistan)	6
Switzerland (Schweizer Hitparade)	20
US Billboard Hot 100	70
US Top Triller (Billboard)	1
US Hot Latin Songs (Billboard)	3
US Latin Airplay (Billboard)	13
US Latin Pop Airplay (Billboard)	3
US Latin Rhythm Airplay (Billboard)	6

2026 weekly chart performance for "Envolver"
Chart (2026)	Peak position
Croatia (Billboard)	1
Latvia Streaming (LaIPA)	2
Luxembourg (Billboard)	1

Chart performance for "Envolver" (remix)
Chart (2022)	Peak position
Chile Pop (Monitor Latino)	6
Colombia Airplay (Monitor Latino)	7
Costa Rica Airplay (Monitor Latino)	4
Dominican Republic Airplay (Monitor Latino)	3
Ecuador Airplay (Monitor Latino)	2
El Salvador Airplay (Monitor Latino)	3
Guatemala Airplay (Monitor Latino)	10
Honduras Airplay (Monitor Latino)	1
Mexico Airplay (Monitor Latino)	13
Nicaragua Airplay (Monitor Latino)	12
Panama Airplay (Monitor Latino)	5
Paraguay Airplay (Monitor Latino)	12
Peru Airplay (Monitor Latino)	2
Puerto Rico Airplay (Monitor Latino)	17
Uruguay Airplay (Monitor Latino)	6
Venezuela Airplay (Monitor Latino)	8

=== Monthly charts ===
Monthly chart performance for "Envolver"
Chart (2022)	Position
Brazil Streaming (Pro-Música Brasil)	4
Paraguay Airplay (SGP)	6

=== Year-end charts ===
Year-end chart performance for "Envolver"
Chart (2022)	Position
Belgium (Ultratop Wallonia)	104
Brazil (Pro-Música Brasil)	28
France (SNEP)	161
Global 200 (Billboard)	68
Spain (PROMUSICAE)	55
Switzerland (Schweizer Hitparade)	93
US Hot Latin Songs (Billboard)	23
US Latin Pop Airplay Songs (Billboard)	6
US Latin Rhythm Airplay (Billboard)	12
US Latin Airplay Songs (Billboard)	17
US Latin Digital Song Sales (Billboard)	17
US Latin Streaming Songs (Billboard)	48

Year-end chart performance for "Envolver (Remix)"
Chart (2022)	Position
Bolivia (Monitor Latino)	23
Chile (Monitor Latino)	29
Colombia (Monitor Latino)	34
Costa Rica (Monitor Latino)	28
Dominican Republic (Monitor Latino)	9
Ecuador (Monitor Latino)	10
El Salvador (Monitor Latino)	12
Guatemala (Monitor Latino)	8
Honduras (Monitor Latino)	5
Mexico (Monitor Latino)	38
Nicaragua (Monitor Latino)	8
Panama (Monitor Latino)	10
Paraguay (Monitor Latino)	31
Peru (Monitor Latino)	20
Puerto Rico (Monitor Latino)	50
Uruguay (Monitor Latino)	11
Venezuela (Monitor Latino)	32

== Certifications ==
Certifications for "Envolver"
Region	Certification	Certified units/sales
Brazil (Pro-Música Brasil)	3× Platinum	120,000^{‡}
Canada (Music Canada)	Gold	40,000^{‡}
France (SNEP)	Platinum	200,000^{‡}
Italy (FIMI)	Platinum	100,000^{‡}
Mexico (AMPROFON)	4× Platinum+Gold	630,000^{‡}
Poland (ZPAV)	Gold	25,000^{‡}
Portugal (AFP)	4× Platinum	40,000^{‡}
Spain (Promusicae)	2× Platinum	120,000^{‡}
United States (RIAA)	17× Platinum (Latin)	1,020,000^{‡}
Streaming
Chile (PROFOVI)	Diamond	18,766,377
^{‡} Sales+streaming figures based on certification alone.

== Release history ==
Release dates and formats for "Envolver"
Region	Date	Format(s)	Label	Ref.
Various	11 November 2021	Digital download; streaming	Warner	
Italy	25 March 2022	Radio airplay	Warner	
