= Anitta (album) =

Studio album by Anitta
- Released: 3 July 2013
- Recorded: 2012–2013
- Studios: U.M. Music Studios (Rio de Janeiro, Brazil); Studios Fibra (RJ, Brazil)
- Genres: Pop; electropop; reggae; funk
- Length: 37:45
- Language: Portuguese
- Label: Warner Brasil
- Producers: Umberto Tavares; Jeferson Junior; Mãozinha

Anitta chronology
Anitta (2013)	Ritmo Perfeito (2014)

Singles from Anitta
- 1. "Menina Má" Released: 16 March 2012; 2. "Meiga e Abusada" Released: 6 July 2012; 3. "Show das Poderosas" Released: 16 April 2013; 4. "Não Para" Released: 2 July 2013; 5. "Zen" Released: 4 November 2013

Anitta is the debut studio album by Brazilian recording artist Anitta, released on July 3, 2013, by Warner Music Brasil. It was preceded by the single "Show das Poderosas," which was the biggest hit song in Brazil in 2013. The album sold over 40,000 copies in the first 10 days after its release. The album had four singles and earned Anitta a Prêmio Extra, with two wins at the Brazilian Music Multishow Award in 2013, and a Latin Grammy Award nomination. To promote the album, she performed on the Rede Globo TV shows Esquenta!, Caldeirão do Huck, Encontro com Fátima Bernardes, Altas Horas, and Mais Você.

On April 6, 2013, Anitta performed on RecordTV's program Legendários, and continued to make promotional television appearances throughout the spring. "Tá na Mira" was released as the third promotional single on April 23, 2013. The previous single, "Show das Poderosas," was released shortly before "Tá na Mira." In the same month, the music video reached 1 million views in one week on YouTube. On June 21, 2013, Anitta reported on her Facebook page that the album was available for pre-sale at her online store, and its cover was revealed on July 2, 2013.

== Production and recording ==
After having caught the attention of DJ Renato Azevedo (known as Batutinha) by recording a cover of Priscila Nocetti's song "Soltinha" and posting it on her YouTube channel. Anitta was later invited by Azevedo to audition.

In February 2013, Anitta signed with Warner Music and released "Meiga e Abusada", initially projected for a September 2013 release.

In February 2013, Anitta began composition work with the production team in the studio. According to Wagner Vianna, artistic director of Warner, "the guys went without sleep some nights. Anitta gave a lot of opinions, but it was not complicated." During this period, Anitta alone wrote "Show das Poderosas" and "Tá na Mira," and the record company decided to release the former as the album's second single. Due to the success of the song, the release of the album was pushed up to June 20, 2013. On the cover, Anitta appears on a brown background, arms open, with her name written with pink glitter.

== Music and lyrics ==
The album attempted to fill a "hole" left in the mainstream Brazilian pop market. People magazine wrote that the album incorporated "international influences with an eye on the throne" of Brazilian pop. The album features sterile beats and explores diverse musical genres such as pop, dance-pop, electropop, dubstep, R&B, reggae and funk carioca. In general, the lyrics explore the power of womanhood and seduction, with feminist and sensual themes.

== Release and promotion ==
After "Meiga e Abusada" was released earlier that year, the album was scheduled for release in September 2013. On April 16, Warner Music released the second single, due to the song's commercial performance – peaking at number one on the Billboard Brasil Hot 100 Airplay. The label decided to move the release to July 6, 2013. The album went on pre-sale on iTunes on July 2 and, on the same day, reached number one in the online store. Simultaneously, Anitta had three songs on iTunes' chart – the single and acoustic versions of "Show das Poderosas" and "Não Para." "Proposta" had been previously released as a promotional single on January 16, 2012, even though the singer didn't have a record deal, and the song was subsequently included on the tracklist. "Menina Má" was released as a promotional single on August 12, 2012, with the music video produced by Mais UP Produtora. Originally planned as the second single, "Tá na Mira" was eventually replaced by "Show das Poderosas" and the former ended up as a promotional release on April 23, 2013. "Eu Sou Assim" was included in the soundtrack of the primetime telenovela Em Família.

=== Singles ===
"Menina Má" and "Meiga e Abusada", previously released as singles on March 16, 2012, and July 6, 2012, respectively, from their eponymous debut EP, were included on the album later. After the release of the album, "Meiga e Abusada" was included as part of the soundtrack of the soap opera Amor à Vida, on TV Globo, and earned Anitta a nomination for "Best Musical Theme" at the Extra Television Awards. The music video for "Menina Má" was recorded in a steel mill, inspired by Beyoncé music videos, and was directed by Galerão Filmes. The music video for "Meiga e Abusada", which includes co-stars Mayra Cardi (a former star of Big Brother Brasil), was released on YouTube on December 18, 2012, but the song had a single release almost two months later. Cardi appears dressed as a sexy maid, serving dinner to the "boss" and his family. It was recorded in a studio in Botafogo, south of Rio de Janeiro. The music video was directed by Blake Farber, who also directed Beyoncé videos. The first part of the video was filmed in Las Vegas and in New York City, and Anitta is seen gambling in a casino.

"Show das Poderosas" was released as the lead single on April 16, 2013, and became Anitta's breakthrough hit. The song has reached over 130 million views and has sold over 50,000 digital copies only in Brazil. The lyric video was released on July 5, 2013. The music video had already been recorded months before the release of the track as a single. Anitta holds total songwriting credits.

"Não Para" was released as the second single on July 2, 2013, and replaced "Show das Poderosas" in the iTunes top spot. It debuted at #6 on the Brazilian Digital Songs chart with 690 units sold. The official video for the song was released on the TV program Fantástico on July 7, 2013.

"Zen" was released as the third single on November 4, 2013. In 2014, it was nominated for the Latin Grammy Award for Best Brazilian Song.

=== Promotional singles ===
"Proposta" was released on January 16, 2012. "Eu Vou Ficar" was released on February 20, 2012. "Tá na Mira" was released on April 23, 2013. An EP with the same title, containing songs like "Meiga e Abusada" plus exclusive songs, was released seven days later.

== Critical reception ==
Professional ratings
Review scores
Source	Rating
Audiograma	5.8/10 stars
G1	Positive
Que Delícia Né, Gente?	6.5/10 stars
Verbloose	6.5/10 stars

Anitta was received with mixed criticism from Brazilian music critics. John Pereira from Audiogram said the album is a cliche pop album but that's not a bad thing. Yuri de Castro from Fita Bruta compared Anitta to Kelly Key and Preta Gil.

Braulio Lorentz from G1 site said that in her first album, Anitta tries to "show that goes beyond the turn that made her to be contracted by a great record company, to inflate its cache and to beat several Brazilian singers". For Lorentz, the tracks of the project are "sticky and whistling," and that Anitta wants to "embrace the pop of Beyoncé (who is always called a fan), Katy Perry (reference declared for the video of "Meiga e Abusada") and Brazilians singers more distant from the studios, like Kelly Key."

The website Que Delícia Né, Gente?, says that the first songs on the album are enough to "stick to your head, whether you like it or not." But, that the project contains positive surprises like "Zen" and "Eu Sou Assim". However, the site closes the criticism saying that if "the intention of the record company was to average, he succeeded, but he scraped." The site Verbloose says that Anitta has a "soft and gentle voice" that gives a personal touch to the songs.

== Track listing ==
Anitta – Standard edition
No.	Title	Writer(s)	Producer(s)	Length
1.	"Show das Poderosas"	Larissa Machado	Umberto Tavares; Mãozinha	2:30
2.	"Meiga e Abusada"	Machado; Jeferson Junior; Cláudia Régina	Larissa Machado; Batutinha; Umberto Tavares	3:49
3.	"Tá na Mira"	Machado	Batutinha	2:51
4.	"Zen"	Machado; Tavares; Junior	Batutinha	2:45
5.	"Achei"	Machado; Tavares; Junior	Tavares; Mãozinha	2:41
6.	"Menina Má"	Machado	Tavares; Mãozinha	2:55
7.	"Príncipe de Vento"	Machado; Tavares; Junior	Batutinha; Machado; Junior; Tavares	2:29
8.	"Não Para"	Machado	Machado; Tavares; Mãozinha	3:13
9.	"Eu Sou Assim"	Machado; Tavares; Junior	Batutinha; Tavares	3:03
10.	"Fica Só Olhando"	Batutinha	Batutinha	2:46
11.	"Proposta"	Batutinha	Tavares; Mãozinha; Batutinha	2:47
12.	"Cachorro Eu Tenho em Casa"	Machado; Tavares; Junior	Tavares; Mãozinha	2:31
13.	"Som do Coração"	Machado	Machado; Mãozinha	3:18
Total length:				37:45

Anitta — Deluxe edition bonus tracks
No.	Title	Writer(s)	Producer(s)	Length
14.	"Eu Vou Ficar"	Batutinha	Tavares; Mãozinha	2:59
15.	"Show das Poderosas (headshot remix)"	Machado	Tavares; Mãozinha	2:20
Total length:				43:05

== Charts ==
=== Weekly charts ===
Chart (2013)	Peak position
Brazilian Albums (ABPD)	1

=== Year-end charts ===
Chart (2013)	Peak position
Brazilian Albums (PMB)	5

== Certifications ==
Region	Certification	Certified units/sales
Brazil (Pro-Música Brasil)	Platinum	80,000^{*}
^{*} Sales figures based on certification alone.
