= Carnatal =

Carnival in Brazil

The Carnatal (Portuguese pronunciation: [kaʁnaˈtaw]) is the largest micareta, or off-season Carnival, in Brazil. It is held annually in December in the city of Natal in the state of Rio Grande do Norte.

Like other micaretas, Carnatal is different from the samba dance school parades popular in Rio de Janeiro. The central feature of a micareta is a large truck or lorry called a "trio elétrico". The trio elétrico is wired with loudspeakers and has a band performing on the trailer. The truck drives slowly along the streets. The crowd follows the trio elétrico singing, dancing, and jumping to the sound of the music. To be allowed to follow the truck, one must buy admittance to one of the several blocos (block). A bloco is an enterprise which obtains permission to participate in Carnatal, hires the band, sells admittance and controls access to a cordoned area around the trio elétrico.

In 2013, Carnatal had a provisional route and location due to urban mobility works; thus, the route of the electric trios invaded the Aristófanes Fernandes Park, already in Parnamirim, metropolitan region of Natal.[12] The Carnatal was held in Parnamirim.
