= Show das Poderosas =

Single by Anitta

from the album Anitta
- Language: Portuguese
- B-side: "Menina Má"
- Released: April 16, 2013
- Recorded: 2013; U.M. Music Studios; (Rio de Janeiro, Brazil)
- Genre: Dance-pop; dubstep
- Length: 2:30
- Label: Warner
- Songwriter: Larissa Machado
- Producer: Umberto Tavares

Anitta singles chronology
"Meiga e Abusada" (2012)	"Show das Poderosas" (2013)	"Não Para" (2013)

Music video
- "Show das Poderosas" on YouTube

"Show das Poderosas" (English: Powerful Girls' Show) is a single by the Brazilian singer Anitta released on April 16, 2013. The song served as the lead single from her self-titled debut album (2013). The song has sold 50,000 paid downloads on Brazilian iTunes, and almost 85,000 worldwide. The song's music video has been viewed over 148 million times on YouTube.

Upon its release, "Show das Poderosas" was met with favorable reception from music critics, many of whom praised it for being different from the other songs released at that time. Commercially, "Show das Poderosas" performed well on record charts.

== Background and release ==
By posting a video singing "Soltinha", by singer Priscila Nocetti, student Larissa de Macedo Machado was discovered by disc jockey (DJ) Renato Azevedo, known as Batutinha. The DJ invited her to a test, in order to know if she really sang well and had a stage presence. Azevedo "was impressed by the singer's and girlfriends' ability to stiletto – a high-heeled dance mode, popularized by the American star Beyoncé", described Silvio Essinger, from O Globo. With that, he decided to work with her. One of the artist's complaints was her name, which she considered very common; Her suggestion was "Anita", in reference to the main character of the miniseries Presença de Anita: "Anita had a mystery that aroused the curiosity of men, women, everyone. It was just a girl, but at the same time I was fond of this joke. Batutinha gave the idea of "Anitta" with two T's, and the singer agreed.

Anitta was hired by the Rio de Janeiro funk shows producer Furacão 2000, and through it she released four tracks: "Menina Má", "Proposta", "Fica Só Olhando" and "Eu Vou Ficar". In June 2012, manager Kamilla Fialho, paid R$260,000 to the company, so that the artist could be managed by her. Fialho set up a show with musicians and dancers, invested in the image of Anitta, and presented her to producers Umberto Tavares and Mãozinha. Anitta was coveted by major record labels; She was "rolling up" two of them until she decided on Warner Music, with whom she signed in January 2013, and on February 6, her first single "Meiga e Abusada" was released through the label.

== Critical reception ==
Alex Alves from Popline website commented, "Grab a funk singer who was a MC from Furacão 2000, add an avalanche of references in Beyoncé and finish with a dipping attitude inspired by The Pussycat Dolls. The result will be Anitta, one of the greatest promises of national pop music in 2013". Some elements of the instrumental were compared to those of Major Lazer's "Pon de Floor", sampled in Beyoncé's single "Run the World (Girls)". The female empowerment message of the song was also compared that of "Run the World (Girls)".

== Music video ==
Directed by Thiago Calviño, filming took place in a theater in Barra da Tijuca neighborhood, in Rio de Janeiro. The video is all in black and white and featured a ballet body made up of 30 dancers who together form an "army." It is inspired by the music video of "Run the World (Girls)" by the American singer Beyoncé. In April 2015 it became the first video of a female Brazilian artist to reach 100 million views on YouTube.

=== Reception ===
In PopLine, Alex Alves commented: "Get a funky carioca singer who has been to MC of Hurricane 2000, add an avalanche of references on the Beyoncé line and end with an attitude immersion inspired by the Pussycat Dolls. greatest promises of national pop music in 2013."

== Promotion ==
Anitta participated in programs where the song was released separately: Esquenta!, Caldeirão do Huck, Encontro com Fátima Bernardes and Mais Você, was one of global programs where the singer presented the song.

It was a promoted single and also spawned the name of tour "Show das Poderosas Tour". The song won several versions of videos, among other is British singer Adele, which was placed with the band remix video. The theme song was the first tour of Anitta, and was also included in minifestival organized by Warner Music.

== Remix version ==
The remix was attended by the DJ and music producer of Anitta, Batutinha, and was launched to music download only on iTunes. The remix that was still being worked, received the genre funk carioca with the pop genre. The remix was recorded in studios in Rio de Janeiro and was included as the last track on the disc.

== Track listings ==
- CD single
1. "Show das Poderosas" – 2:30
- Digital download
1. "Show das Poderosas" – 2:30
2. "Menina Má" – 2:55

== Charts ==
=== Weekly charts ===
Chart (2013)	Peak position
BR Billboard Hot 100	2
BR Hot Popular Songs (Billboard)	1
BR Hot Pop Songs (Billboard)	1
Portugal Digital Songs (Billboard)	1

=== Monthly charts ===
Chart (2013)	Position
Brasil Hot 100 Airplay	2
Brasil Hot Pop Songs	1
Brasil Hot Popular Songs	1

=== Year-end charts ===
Chart (2013)	Position
Brasil Hot 100 Airplay	3

== Release history ==
Country	Date	Format	Record company
United States	April 9, 2013	Digital download	Warner Music
Brazil	April 16, 2013	Digital download	Warner Music
Portugal	April 16, 2013	Digital download	Warner Music
