= Altas Horas =

Brazilian television program

Altas Horas is a Brazilian television program broadcast by Rede Globo since 2000. It is hosted by Serginho Groisman.

== Production ==
The program is recorded at the TV Globo studios in São Paulo and directed by Serginho Groisman and Adriano Ricco. On June 15, 2013, the program swapped time slots with Supercine, due to the high audience ratings it received when broadcast earlier because of the UFC, and began airing at 23:15. In February 2016, the Altas Horas band was dismissed after more than 10 years on the program. The network stated that the show would adopt a new artistic concept in 2016.

In the same year, the program had a three-week recess (from 6 to 20 August) due to TV Globo's broadcast of the 2016 Summer Olympics. The program has also been broadcast on Multishow since 2008, rebroadcast on Sundays.

Between March 21 and July 4, 2020, the program rebroadcast its best moments from the show's 20-year history due to the COVID-19 pandemic, which caused the program's recordings to be cancelled. On July 11, new episodes returned, but via video call, with each participant appearing from their home. On December 12, Groisman returned to the Estúdios Globo, although some guests and audience members continued appearing from home. On that same day, the program began airing after the nine o’clock telenovela until January 23, 2021, due to the cancellation of Zorra. From January 30, it returned to its regular time slot.

== Notable guests ==
=== 2023 ===
==== 7 January 2023 ====
- Janja Lula da Silva, then First Lady of Brazil, was present in the audience of Altas Horas at the invitation of host Serginho Groisman. The episode was recorded on 7 December 2022 and aired on the first Saturday of 2023. In addition to the first lady, the then future minister of Human Rights and Citizenship Sílvio Almeida was also present; he had been sworn in on 1 January 2023 in Brasília.

=== 2004 ===
- In 2004, the then mayor of São Paulo, Marta Suplicy (PT), appeared on Altas Horas in a special episode that included remote participation by singer Rita Lee and her husband Roberto de Carvalho, broadcasting directly from Salvador.

== Awards and nominations ==
Year	Award	Category	Nominee	Result	Ref.
2016	Troféu Imprensa	Best Variety Show	Altas Horas	Nominated	
2016	Troféu Internet	Variety Show	Altas Horas	Nominated	
2016	Troféu Internet	Interview Program	Altas Horas	Nominated	
2024	Splash Awards	Best host of a TV/videocast/podcast entertainment program	Serginho Groisman	Won	

== Band ==
During the conception of the program, Serginho decided to include a house band originally composed of six members personally selected by him after several auditions. They played between commercial breaks and accompanied guests whenever one of them sang without bringing their own musicians.

In 2004, the band added three vocalists: Graça Cunha, Leilah Moreno, and Jackeline Ribas.

In 2010, Jackeline left the band and was replaced by Nanny Soul. In 2011, Leilah also left the group to pursue an acting career, and Jamilly Silva took her place.

In 2016, after sixteen years, the band was dismissed from the program, reportedly due to cost-cutting measures.
