= Meiga e Abusada =

Single by Anitta

from the album Anitta
- Language: Portuguese
- Released: July 6, 2012
- Recorded: 2012; Biscoito Fino Studios (Rio de Janeiro, Brazil)
- Genre: Dance-pop
- Length: 3:49
- Label: Warner Music
- Songwriters: Larissa Machado; Jeferson Junior; Claudia Regina
- Producers: Umberto Tavares; Mãozinha

Anitta singles chronology
"Menina Má" (2012)	"Meiga e Abusada" (2012)	"Show das Poderosas" (2013)

Music video
- "Meiga e Abusada" on YouTube

"Meiga e Abusada" (English: Sweet and Sassy) is the debut single by Brazilian singer Anitta. It was first released on radio on July 6, 2012 by Furacão 2000. On February 6, 2013 it was re-released on digital download by Warner Music, after the singer had signed to the label. The song was included on her eponymous debut album Anitta (2013). It was featured on the soundtrack of the telenovela Amor à Vida, from Rede Globo.

== Background ==
Anitta was discovered by disc jockey (DJ) Renato Azevedo, known as Batutinha, by publicly releasing a video singing "Soltinha" by singer Priscila Nocetti, on YouTube. He also invited her to do some singing tests and presentations, in order to know if she was vocally tuned and had the ability to perform on a stage; she drew the DJ's attention while demonstrating her skills in stiletto dance. After that he decided to work with her.

Anitta was hired by the production company Furacão 2000, and through it, she released four tracks: "Menina Má", "Proposta", "Fica Só Olhando" and "Eu Vou Ficar", all of which were later included on her debut album. In June 2012, businesswoman Kamilla Fialho paid R$260,000 to the company so Anitta would be managed by her. Fialho set up a show with musicians and dancers, invested on Anitta's image and introduced her to producers Umberto Tavares and Mãozinha. Anitta was coveted by major labels; she did talks with two labels until she decided on Warner Music, with which she signed in January 2013. On February 6, "Meiga e Abusada" was released through the label.

== Music video ==
The music video for "Meiga e Abusada", featuring former Big Brother Brasil contestant Mayra Cardi, was released on Anitta's YouTube channel on December 18, 2012. In the video, Cardi appears dressed as a sexy maid, serving the dinner for the "mistress" and her family. The scenes were filmed at a studio in Botafogo, South Zone of Rio de Janeiro, and directed by Blake Farber, who also directed Beyoncé videos. The first part of the video was filmed in Las Vegas. The video shows Anitta having fun in Las Vegas with her dancers. At the beginning of the video, she appears in a house, sitting at the table with some people and begins to sing as the scenery changes. The video was inspired by "I Hate This Part" by American pop group Pussycat Dolls.

In one scene Anitta is seen at a Casino in Las Vegas, but at the time she was only 19, and the minimum age to enter is 21, so she came in disguise.

== Track listings and formats ==
- Digital download
1. "Meiga e Abusada" - 3:49

== Release history ==
Country	Date	Format	Label
Brazil	July 6, 2012	Digital download	Furacão 2000
Brazil	February 6, 2013	Digital download	Warner Music Group
