= Não Para =

Single by Anitta

from the album Anitta
- Language: Portuguese
- Released: July 2, 2013
- Recorded: 2013; U.M. Music Studios (Rio de Janeiro, Brazil)
- Genre: EDM
- Length: 3:13
- Label: Warner Music
- Songwriter: Larissa Machado
- Producer: Umberto Tavares

Anitta singles chronology
"Show das Poderosas" (2013)	"Não Para" (2013)	"Zen" (2013)

Music video
- "Não Para" on YouTube

Não Para (English: Don't Stop) is a song performed by Brazilian singer Anitta from her first studio album Anitta. The song debuted at Web Mania on May 31, 2013, and was released as the second single on July 1, 2013. The song reached the top sales position on iTunes only one day after the song was made available.

The lyrics video was released on July 5, 2013. The music video, which was filmed months in advance of the song's official release, premiered on the Fantástico program on July 7, 2013.

== Music video ==
The official video was released on July 7, 2013, on the TV show Fantástico, and then on July 15 on Anitta's official YouTube channel. The video for Não Para was inspired by the modern, hectic atmosphere of São Paulo nightclubs. At a news conference about the album, which was still in production by Warner Music, Anitta said that the video of the song Não Para would have a different take on clubs, and be a modern ballad video, appealing to the younger generation of viewers and listeners. In the video, Anitta plays two characters: herself as Anitta, and another character that appears to be her sister. For the sister character, Anitta and her producer chose the name Talitta, mirroring the name Anitta.

=== Synopsis ===
The setting of the video is a typical São Paulo nightclub. The video begins with a lit neon sign that says that Talitta will be performing at the club tonight. Anitta walks down a dark and dirty corridor chewing gum. The video cuts to Talitta singing on stage and attempting to show the audience that she is sexy. The video switches scenes between Talitta's and Anitta's narrative. Anitta moves into a room to work at the nightclub while Talitta sings the chorus of the song on stage. Anitta begins serving customers and people start complaining about Talitta's performance. Anitta ends up dancing to the beat of the song and the audience realizes that Anitta is far better than Talitta. People at the nightclub boo Talitta and throw scraps of paper at her. Anitta's friends tell her to climb on the bar to show off her skills. Anitta let's go of her inhibitions and Talitta looks at Anitta with envy. The dancers who were on stage with Talitta are embarrassed and leave the stage. Anitta continues to dance while Talitta slowly and indignantly leaves the stage.

Anitta gets down from the bar and moves through the crowd; then she climbs on stage and begins to sing and dance with her friends. Patrons of the club are more animated about Anitta's performance. The video cuts to Talitta crying in a stairway with her dancers. The video ends with Anitta leaving the stage slowly. The last shot is of the microphone alone on the stage.

== Release ==
Anitta released the song Não Para on Radio Mania Web on May 31, 2013. It was released as the third official single from the Anitta album on July 1, 2013.

== Commercial performance ==
A day after the song was released on iTunes, the song hit number one on the Brazilian iTunes chart. The song also charted fourth on Brasil Hot 100 Airplay.

== Track listing ==
CD single
No.	Title	Length
1.	"Não Para"	3:13

Download digital
No.	Title	Length
1.	"Não Para"	3:13

EP Download digital
No.	Title	Length
1.	"Não Para"	3:13
2.	"Não Para" (Extended)	4:28
3.	"Não Para" (DeepLick Remix)	3:33
4.	"Não Para" (DeepLick Club Remix)	5:38
5.	"Não Para" (Vídeo)	3:27

== Charts ==
=== Weekly charts ===
Chart (2013)	Peak position
Brazil (Billboard Hot 100)	4

=== Year-end charts ===
Chart (2013)	Peak position
Brazil (Brasil Hot 100 Airplay)	55
