= NLE Choppa discography =

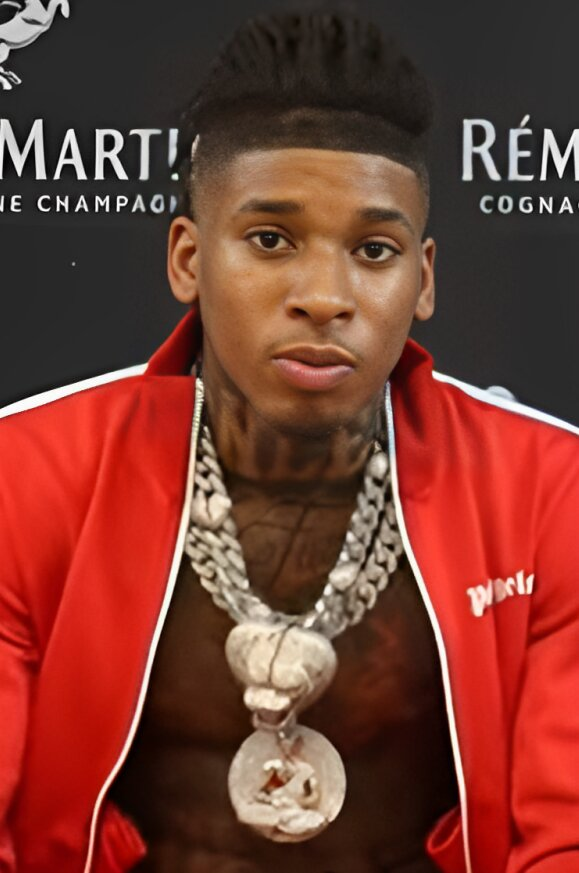
- NLE Choppa in 2022
- Studio albums: 2
- EPs: 1
- Singles: 39
- Music videos: 14
- Mixtapes: 7
- Music videos: 24

The discography of American rapper NLE Choppa consists of two studio albums, two compilation albums, one extended play, seven mixtapes, thirty-nine singles, and 24 music videos.

NLE Choppa's debut EP and debut project, Cottonwood, was released on December 23, 2019. His debut studio album, Top Shotta, was released on August 7, 2020. His mixtape, From Dark to Light, was released on November 1, 2020, which was his 18th birthday. He has several singles that have entered the Billboard Hot 100, such as "Shotta Flow" and "Walk Em Down", the latter featuring fellow American rapper Roddy Ricch. On April 14, 2023, he released his second studio album, Cottonwood 2 and four days later he released the deluxe edition of the album, and on October 27, 2023, he released the deluxe 2.0 edition. He is also expected to release his third studio album, Top Shotta 2 in 2026

== Albums ==
=== Studio albums ===
List of studio albums, with selected details
Title	Album details	Peak chart positions					Certifications
Title	Album details	US	US R&B/HH	US Rap	CAN	NOR	Certifications
Top Shotta	Released: August 7, 2020; Label: No Love Entertainment, Warner; Format: CD, digital download, streaming	10	6	7	14	31	RIAA: Platinum; MC: Platinum
Cottonwood 2	Released: April 14, 2023; Label: No Love Entertainment, Warner; Format: CD, digital download, streaming	21	9	7	39	—	
Top Shotta 2	To be released: 2026; Label: No Love Entertainment, Warner; Format: TBA	To be released					
"—" denotes a recording that did not chart or was not released in that territory.

=== Compilation albums ===
List of compilation albums, with selected details
Title	Album details	Peak chart positions
Title	Album details	US
Certified	Released: April 5, 2024; Label: No Love Entertainment, Warner; Format: Digital download, streaming	171
Picasso: Sluffin Szn x Slut Szn	Released: December 24, 2024; Label: No Love Entertainment, Warner; Format: Digital download, streaming	150

== Extended plays ==
List of EPs, with selected details
Title	EP details	Peak chart positions				Certifications
Title	EP details	US	US R&B/HH	US Rap	CAN	Certifications
Cottonwood	Released: December 23, 2019; Label: No Love Entertainment, UnitedMasters; Format: CD, digital download, streaming	57	20	13	64	RIAA: Gold; MC: Gold

== Mixtapes ==
List of mixtapes, with selected details
Title	Mixtape details	Peak chart positions			
Title	Mixtape details	US	US R&B/HH	US Rap	CAN
No Love the Takeover (as YNR Choppa)	Released: July 22, 2018; Label: Self-released; Format: Digital download, streaming	—	—	—	—
Narco Choppa (with Icy Narco)	Released: April 26, 2019; Label: Dundridge Entertainment; Format: CD, digital download, streaming	—	—	—	—
Holly Trap (with NoCap)	Released: November 15, 2019; Label: D. Management; Format: CD, digital download, streaming	—	—	—	—
From Dark to Light	Released: November 1, 2020; Label: No Love Entertainment, Warner; Format: CD, digital download, streaming	115	—	—	—
Me vs. Me	Released: January 28, 2022; Label: No Love Entertainment, Warner; Format: CD, digital download, streaming	14	8	5	32
The Chosen Ones (with DJ Booker)	Released: January, 5 2024; Label: Streetzrus; Format: Digital download, streaming	—	—	—	—
Shotta Flow Series	Released: 23 February 2024; Label: No Love Entertainment, Warner; Format: Digital download, streaming	—	—	—	—
Slut Szn	Released: 27 September 2024; Label: No Love Entertainment, Warner; Format: Digital download, streaming	199	—	—	—
"—" denotes a recording that did not chart or was not released in that territory.

== Singles ==
=== As lead artist ===
List of singles as a solo artist, showing year released and album name
Title	Year	Peak chart positions									Certifications	Album
Title	Year	US	US R&B/HH	US Rap	AUS	CAN	IRE	NZ Hot	UK	WW	Certifications	Album
"Feeling My Drip"	2018	—	—	—	—	—	—	—	—	—		Non-album singles
"Redrum"	2018	—	—	—	—	—	—	—	—	—		Non-album singles
"Drip Creator"	2018	—	—	—	—	—	—	—	—	—		Non-album singles
"Shotta Flow" (Note: Also appears on Shotta Flow Series) (solo or remix featuring Blueface)	2019	36	14	12	—	42	75	40	—	—	RIAA: 3× Platinum; RIAA: 2× Platinum (Remix); BPI: Silver; MC: 5× Platinum; RMNZ: Platinum	Cottonwood
"Shotta Flow 2"	2019	—	— (Note: "Shotta Flow 2" did not enter the Hot R&B/Hip-Hop Songs chart, but peaked at number nine on the Bubbling Under R&B/Hip-Hop Singles chart.)	—	—	—	—	—	—	—	RIAA: Platinum	Shotta Flow Series
"Capo"	2019	—	— (Note: "Capo" did not enter the Hot R&B/Hip-Hop Songs chart, but peaked at number 10 on the Bubbling Under R&B/Hip-Hop Singles chart.)	—	—	—	—	—	—	—	RIAA: Platinum; RMNZ: Gold	Non-album singles
"Birdboy"	2019	—	—	—	—	—	—	—	—	—		Non-album singles
"Blocc Is Hot"	2019	—	—	—	—	—	—	—	—	—		Non-album singles
"Drip"	2019	—	—	—	—	—	—	—	—	—		Non-album singles
"ChopBloc" (with BlocBoy JB)	2019	—	—	—	—	—	—	—	—	—		Non-album singles
"Stick by My Side" (with Clever)	2019	—	—	—	—	—	—	—	—	—		Who Is Clever?
"Free Youngboy"	2019	—	—	—	—	—	—	—	—	—	RIAA: Gold	Non-album singles
"Cursed Vibes"	2019	—	—	—	—	—	—	—	—	—		Non-album singles
"Shotta Flow 3" (Note: Also appears on Shotta Flow Series)	2019	— (Note: "Shotta Flow 3" did not enter the Billboard Hot 100, but peaked at number 19 on the Bubbling Under Hot 100 chart.)	— (Note: "Shotta Flow 3" did not enter the Hot R&B/Hip-Hop Songs chart, but peaked at number five on the Bubbling Under R&B/Hip-Hop Singles chart.)	—	—	—	—	—	—	—	RIAA: Platinum; MC: Platinum	Top Shotta
"Nolove Anthem"	2019	—	—	—	—	—	—	—	—	—		No Love: The Takeover
"Camelot"	2019	37	17	14	—	35	78	10	—	—	RIAA: 5× Platinum; MC: 4× Platinum; BPI: Silver; RMNZ: Platinum	Top Shotta
"ChopBloc 2" (with BlocBoy JB)	2019	—	—	—	—	—	—	—	—	—		Non-album singles
"Forever"	2019	— (Note: "Forever" did not enter the Billboard Hot 100, but peaked at number 18 on the Bubbling Under Hot 100 chart.)	— (Note: "Forever" did not enter the Hot R&B/Hip-Hop Songs chart, but peaked at number six on the Bubbling Under R&B/Hip-Hop Singles chart.)	—	—	—	—	—	—	—		Non-album singles
"Dekario (Pain)"	2019	—	—	—	—	—	—	—	—	—		Non-album singles
"Famous Hoes"	2019	83	36	—	—	95	—	—	—	—	RIAA: Platinum	Non-album singles
"Side"	2019	—	—	—	—	—	—	—	—	—		Cottonwood
"Exotic"	2020	—	—	—	—	—	—	—	—	—		Non-album single
"Go Stupid" (with Polo G, Stunna 4 Vegas, and Mike Will Made It)	2020	60	29	20	—	28	97	17	—	—	RIAA: 3× Platinum; BPI: Silver; MC: Platinum; RMNZ: Platinum	The Goat
"100 Shots"	2020	—	—	—	—	—	—	—	—	—		Non-album single
"Walk Em Down" (featuring Roddy Ricch)	2020	38	16	14	—	49	65	9	85	—	RIAA: 5× Platinum; BPI: Silver; MC: 4× Platinum; RMNZ: Platinum	Top Shotta
"Shotta Flow 5" (Note: Also appears on Shotta Flow Series)	2020	54	23	20	—	51	—	15	—	—	RIAA: Platinum; MC: Gold	Top Shotta
"Ruff Ryders"	2020	—	—	—	—	—	—	—	—	—		Road To Fast 9 Mixtape
"Narrow Road" (featuring Lil Baby)	2020	— (Note: "Narrow Road" did not enter the Billboard Hot 100, but peaked at number four on the Bubbling Under Hot 100 chart.)	46	—	—	—	—	19	—	—	RIAA: Platinum; MC: Gold	Top Shotta
"Make Em Say" (featuring Latto)	2020	—	—	—	—	—	—	—	—	—		Top Shotta
"Bryson"	2020	—	—	—	—	—	—	—	—	—		From Dark to Light
"Jiggin'"	2020	—	—	—	—	—	—	—	—			Non-album singles
"Protect"	2020	—	—	—	—	—	—	—	—	—		Non-album singles
"Final Warning"	2021	90	40	—	—	95	—	—	—	—	RIAA: Platinum; MC: Gold	Me vs. Me
"Letter to My Daughter"	2021	—	—	—	—	—	—	—	—	—		Non-album single
"Mmm Hmm"	2021	— (Note: "Mmm Hmm" did not enter the Billboard Hot 100, but peaked at number 22 on the Bubbling Under Hot 100 chart.)	—	—	—	—	—	—	—	—		Me vs. Me
"Jumpin'" (featuring Polo G)	2021	89	40	15	—	74	—	25	—	195	RIAA: Gold; MC: Gold	Me vs. Me
"I.Y.B"	2021	—	—	—	—	—	—	—	—	—		Me vs. Me
"Drop Shit"	2021	—	—	—	—	—	—	—	—	—		Me vs. Me
"Too Hot" (featuring Moneybagg Yo)	2022	— (Note: "Too Hot" did not enter the Billboard Hot 100, but peaked at number 14 on the Bubbling Under Hot 100 chart.)	—	—	—	—	—	—	—	—		Me vs. Me
"Shotta Flow 6" (Note: Also appears on Shotta Flow Series)	2022	86	30	—	—	—	—	—	—	—	RIAA: Gold	Me vs. Me
"The Gender Reveal Song"	2022	—	—	—	—	—	—	—	—	—		Non-album singles
"Yak Flow"	2022	—	—	—	—	—	—	—	—	—		Non-album singles
"Slut Me Out"	2022	28	9	4	48	24	70	15	68	48	RIAA: 2× Platinum; ARIA: Gold; BPI: Silver; MC: Platinum; RMNZ: Platinum	Cottonwood 2
"Set Up Story Part 1"	2022	—	—	—	—	—	—	—	—	—		Non-album singles
"Apart from You"	2022	—	—	—	—	—	—	—	—	—		Non-album singles
"In the UK"	2022	—	—	—	—	—	—	—	—	—		Cottonwood 2
"Do It Again" (featuring 2Rare)	2022	85	30	20	—	92	—	27	—	—	RIAA: Platinum; MC: Gold; RMNZ: Gold	Cottonwood 2
"Faithful" (with Macklemore)	2022	—	—	—	—	—	—	—	—	—		Ben
"Ice Spice"	2022	—	—	—	—	—	—	—	—	—		Non-album singles
"I Like"	2022	—	—	—	—	—	—	—	—	—		Non-album singles
"Don't Understand" (with Young Dra)	2023	—	—	—	—	—	—	—	—	—		Non-album singles
"23"	2023	—	—	—	—	—	—	—	—	—		Non-album singles
"Champions"	2023	—	—	—	—	—	—	—	—	—		Cottonwood 2
"Mo Up Front"	2023	—	—	—	—	—	—	—	—	—		Cottonwood 2
"Ain't Gonna Answer" (featuring Lil Wayne)	2023	— (Note: "Ain't Gonna Answer" did not enter the Billboard Hot 100, but peaked at number 10 on the Bubbling Under Hot 100 chart.)	33	20	—	—	—	—	—	—		Cottonwood 2
"Angel Pt. 1" (with Kodak Black and Jimin featuring Jvke and Muni Long)	2023	65	18	11	—	63	99	6	82	16		Fast X
"It's Getting Hot"	2023	— (Note: "It's Getting Hot" did not enter the Billboard Hot 100, but peaked at number eight on the Bubbling Under Hot 100 chart.)	36	—	—	83	—	9	—	—	RIAA: Gold	Cottonwood 2
"Shotta Flow 7" (solo or remix featuring Lil Mabu)	2023	— (Note: "Shotta Flow 7" did not enter the Billboard Hot 100, but peaked at number 24 on the Bubbling Under Hot 100 chart.)	—	—	—	—	—	23	—	—		Shotta Flow Series
"City Lights"	2024	—	—	—	—	—	—	38	—	—		Non-album singles
"Slut Me Out 2"	2024	— (Note: "Slut Me Out 2" did not enter the Billboard Hot 100, but peaked at number 23 on the Bubbling Under Hot 100 chart.)	37	—	—	—	—	—	—	—	MC: Gold	Slut Szn
"Catalina" (solo or remix featuring Yaisel LM)	2024	—	—	—	—	—	—	—	—	—		Slut Szn
"Muhammad Ali" (with Diljit Dosanjh)	2024	—	—	—	—	—	—	26	—	—		Non-album singles
"Country Me Out" (with J.P.)	2024	—	—	—	—	—	—	—	—	—		Slut Szn
"Dump Truck 2.0" (with Kinfolk Thugs)	2024	—	—	—	—	—	—	—	—	—		Non-album single
"Or What" (with 41)	2024	52	9	6	—	69	—	14	—	—	RIAA: Gold	Slut Szn
"Slut Me Out 3" (with Whethan featuring Carey Washington)	2024	—	—	—	—	—	—	—	—	—		Slut Szn
"Dare U" (with Imagine Dragons)	2025	—	—	—	—	—	—	22	—	—		Non-album singles
"444"	2025	—	—	—	—	—	—	—	—	—		Non-album singles
"Free Youngboy 2 (Fill Up the Clip)"	2025	—	—	—	—	—	—	—	—	—		Non-album singles
"Can We Live?" (with B.O.A Mook)	2025	—	—	—	—	—	—	—	—	—		Non-album singles
"Crescent Moon"	2025	—	—	—	—	—	—	—	—	—		Non-album singles
"Vida C*brona" (with Pressure 9x19 and Slayter featuring Sombra PR)	2025	—	—	—	—	—	—	—	—	—		Non-album singles
"Show Me Your Love" (with Trillian)	2025	—	—	—	—	—	—	—	—	—		Non-album singles
"Hard Life" (featuring Carey Washington)	2025	—	—	—	—	—	—	—	—	—		Non-album singles
"La La La" (with Trillian)	2025	—	—	—	—	—	—	—	—	—		Non-album singles
"KO"	2025	— (Note: "KO" did not enter the Billboard Hot 100, but peaked at number 4 on the Bubbling Under Hot 100 chart.)	27	—	—	—	—	—	—	—		Non-album singles
"Hello Revenge"	2025	—	—	—	—	—	—	—	—	—		Non-album singles
"Set the Record Straight"	2026	—	—	—	—	—	—	—	—	—		Non-album singles
"Shotta Flow 8"	2026	—	—	—	—	—	—	—	—	—		Non-album singles
"—" denotes a recording that did not chart or was not released in that territory.

=== As featured artist ===
Title	Year	Peak chart positions			Certifications	Album
Title	Year	US R&B/HH	US Rhy.	NZ Hot	Certifications	Album
"Hit the Scene" (White $osa featuring NLE Choppa)	2019	—	—	—	RIAA: Gold	Non-album single
"Walk It Out" (Nykobandz featuring NLE Choppa)	2019	—	—	—		Lil Swim
"Gangsta Talk" (Fredo Bang featuring NLE Choppa)	2019	—	—	—		Big Ape
"Beef" (9lokkNine featuring Murda Beatz and NLE Choppa)	2019	—	—	—		Non-album singles
"Double" (Smokepurpp featuring NLE Choppa)	2019	—	—	—		Non-album singles
"Get Like Me" (Bhad Bhabie featuring NLE Choppa)	2019	—	—	—		Non-album singles
"Choppas on Choppas" (Action Pack featuring NLE Choppa)	2019	—	—	—		Non-album singles
"Zombie" (Kodak Black featuring NLE Choppa and DB Omerta)	2019	—	—	—		Non-album singles
"Hit Yo Dance" (Rubi Rose featuring NLE Choppa and Yella Beezy)	2019	— (Note: "Hit Yo Dance" did not enter the Hot R&B/Hip-Hop Songs chart but peaked at number 23 on the Mainstream R&B/Hip-Hop Airplay chart.)	29	—		
"Holy Moly" (Blueface featuring NLE Choppa)	2020	—	—	32		Find the Beat
"Grim Reapa Flow" (30 Deep Grimeyy featuring NLE Choppa)	2020	—	—	—		Non-album single
"Tour" (Blueface featuring NLE Choppa)	2020	—	—	—		Famous Cryp
"Good Morning" (Remix) (Maksauce featuring NLE Choppa & Lil Yachty)	2020	—	—	—		What Is World 2
"6locc 6a6y (Remix)" (Lil Loaded featuring NLE Choppa)	2020	—	—	—		A Demon in 6lue
"Punchin" (Teejayx6 featuring NLE Choppa)	2020	—	—	—		Black Air Force Activity: The Reload
"Magic" (Sprado featuring NLE Choppa)	2020	—	—	—		Non-album single
"Chopbloc Pt. 3" (Blocboy JB featuring NLE Choppa)	2020	—	—	—		FatBoy
"Load It Up" (Juicy J featuring NLE Choppa)	2020	—	—	—		The Hustle Continues
"Ayeee" (Dj Booker featuring NLE Choppa)	2020					Non-album singles
"Turn Me Up" (Kingg Bucc featuring NLE Choppa)	2020	—	—	—		Non-album singles
"Part of the Game" (50 Cent featuring NLE Choppa and Rileyy Lanez)	2020	—	—	10		Non-album singles
"Lose My Cool" (070 Shake featuring NLE Choppa)	2021	—	—	—		Double Sided: Alt
"Citi Trends" (YNW BSlime featuring NLE Choppa)	2021	—	—	—		TBA
"On Sight" (Unghetto Mathieu featuring NLE Choppa)	2022	—	—	—		Happy Trap
"Bustdown Rollie Avalanche" (Kai Cenat featuring NLE Choppa)	2022	—	—	—	RIAA: Gold	Non-album single
"Faithful" (Macklemore featuring NLE Choppa)	2022	—	—	—		Ben
"9 Lives" (DDG featuring Polo G and NLE Choppa)	2022	50	—	—		It's Not Me, It's You
"Diamonds" (Rari featuring NLE Choppa)	2022	—	—	—		Non-album singles
"Salty" (IDK featuring NLE Choppa)	2023	—	—	—		Non-album singles
"We On Em" (Rondodasosa featuring NLE Choppa)	2023	—	—	—		Non-album singles
"Triple A" (Jubël featuring NLE Choppa)	2023	—	—	—		Non-album singles
"I'm Geekin (Remix)" (DDG featuring NLE Choppa)	2023	—	—	—		Non-album singles
"Bonjour" (Gambi featuring NLE Choppa)	2023	—	—	—		Non-album singles
"Stick By My Side 2" (Clever featuring NLE Choppa)	2023	—	—	—		Non-album singles
"Alexander McQueen" (Bently Boy featuring NLE Choppa)	2023	—	—	—		Non-album singles
"Last Laugh (Remix)" (Ceechynaa featuring NLE Choppa)	2024	—	—	—		Non-album singles
"Blick (Remix)" (ScarLip featuring NLE Choppa)	2024	—	—	—		TBA
"FNBM" (Ray Vaughn featuring NLE Choppa)	2024	—	—	—		Non-album singles
"Thick of It (Remix)" (KSI featuring Trippie Redd and NLE Choppa)	2024	—	—	—		Non-album singles
"—" denotes a recording that did not chart or was not released in that territory.

== Other charted songs ==
List of other charted songs, showing year released and album name
Title	Year	Peak chart positions				Certifications	Album
Title	Year	US	US R&B/HH	CAN	NZ Hot	Certifications	Album
"Matrix"	2019	—	—	—	35		Cottonwood
"Picture Me Grapin'"	2020	—	—	—	36	RIAA: Gold	From Dark to Light
"Unapologetic" (Polo G featuring NLE Choppa)	2021	— (Note: "Unapologetic" did not enter the Billboard Hot 100, but peaked at number three on the Bubbling Under Hot 100 chart.)	38	—	33	RIAA: Gold	Hall of Fame 2.0
"Push It" (featuring Young Thug)	2022	— (Note: "Push It" did not enter the Billboard Hot 100, but peaked at number four on the Bubbling Under Hot 100 chart.)	40	—	40		Me vs. Me
"We See You"	2023	—	—	—	37		Cottonwood 2 (Deluxe 2.0)
"Cmon Freestyle"	2023	—	—	—	26		Cottonwood 2 (Deluxe 2.0)
"Pistol Paccin" (featuring BigXthaPlug)	2024	— (Note: "Pistol Paccin" did not enter the Billboard Hot 100, but peaked at number 25 on the Bubbling Under Hot 100 chart.)	47	—	—	RIAA: Gold	Cottonwood 2 (Deluxe 2.0)
"Gang Baby"	2024	82	17	68	19	RIAA: Gold; RMNZ: Gold	Slut Szn
"—" denotes a recording that did not chart in that territory.

== Guest appearances ==
List of non-single guest appearances, with other performing artists, showing year released and album name
Title	Year	Other performer(s)	Album
"Dreams"	2019	Birdman, Juvenile	Just Another Gangsta
"Double"	2019	Smokepurpp	Lost Planet
"Dance"	2019	Hoodrich Pablo Juan, Key Glock	BLO: The Movie
"100 or Better"	2019	Stunna 4 Vegas	Big 4x
"Time to Shine"	2019	Young E.Z.	Time to Shine
"Hittas"	2019	Yella Beezy	Baccend Beezy
"Poles"	2019	Quin NFN	4Nun
"John Gotti"	2019	B. Lou	Bow
"Ostre Pestki"	2023	Malik Montana	Adwokat Diabła
"Why"	2024	Lil Tjay	Farewell
"Man On A Mission"	2025	DDG, Kyle Richh	Blame The Chat
