= Shotta Flow 6 =

2022 single by NLE Choppa

Single by NLE Choppa

from the album Me vs. Me
- Released: January 28, 2022
- Genre: Hip hop; trap
- Length: 3:12
- Label: Warner; No Love
- Songwriters: Bryson Potts; Alex Petit; Ryan Nerby
- Producers: CashMoneyAP; King Fisher

NLE Choppa singles chronology
"Too Hot" (2022)	"Shotta Flow 6" (2022)	"Kicc Bacc" (2022)

Music video
- "Shotta Flow 6" on YouTube

"Shotta Flow 6" is a song by American rapper NLE Choppa, released on January 28, 2022 as the seventh single from his fourth mixtape Me vs. Me, which was released concurrently. Produced by CashMoneyAP and King Fisher, it is the sixth installment in the "Shotta Flow" series.

== Background ==
In an interview with HipHopDX in August 2020, NLE Choppa said he intended "Shotta Flow 5" to be the last song in his "Shotta Flow" series, but would make a sequel if it would feature rapper Lil Wayne. Choppa previewed a snippet of the track in March 2021, and later its outro in November 2021.

== Composition ==
The song finds NLE Choppa rapping in a rapid, couplet flow, threatening his enemies and boasting his wealth, over trap production featuring piano.

== Critical reception ==
The song was well-received by music critics. Mackenzie Cummings-Grady of HipHopDX stated it "shows off everything that endeared fans to Choppa in the past and is one of the project's most impressive tracks. Choppa's voluble lyrics tumble out like an unspooling ball of yarn as the track's rambunctious piano pushes him along. It's a grand opening to the tape, but deflation sets in by tape's end when it's revealed the song is his creative apex." Fred Thomas of AllMusic commented the rapper "sounds absolutely electrified" in the song and that "Though it's a nearly identical instrumental, NLE Choppa's relentless bars are pitched up to a new intensity here, starting out the mixtape with a striking display of just how much he's grown in only a few years." Robin Murray of Clash described the song as a highlight of Me vs. Me, "showcasing his quickfire style, deft rhyme structures, and Choppa's ability to pivot around icy trap beats."

== Music video ==
An official music video was released alongside the single. A self-directed visual, it sees NLE Choppa leaning out the back of a car, smacking around a corpse, and engaged in a rap battle with a clone of himself (as depicted on the cover art of Me vs. Me).

== Charts ==
Chart performance for "Shotta Flow 6"
Chart (2022)	Peak position
US Billboard Hot 100	86
US Hot R&B/Hip-Hop Songs (Billboard)	30

== Certifications ==
Certifications for "Shotta Flow 6"
Region	Certification	Certified units/sales
United States (RIAA)	Gold	500,000^{‡}
^{‡} Sales+streaming figures based on certification alone.
