= Capo (song) =

2019 single by NLE Choppa

Single by NLE Choppa
- Released: March 22, 2019
- Studio: One Sound Studio
- Length: 3:12
- Label: NLE Choppa Entertainment
- Songwriter(s): Bryson Potts
- Producer(s): Midas800

NLE Choppa singles chronology
"Going Str8 in, Pt. 3" (2019)	"Capo" (2019)	"Hotspot" (2019)

Music video
- "Capo" on YouTube

"Capo" is a single by American rapper NLE Choppa, released on March 22, 2019. It was produced by Midas800.

== Background and composition ==
NLE Choppa recorded the song at One Sound Studio in South Memphis, Memphis, Tennessee. Producer Midas800, who previously produced Choppa's hit single "Shotta Flow", sent him the beat, which is piano-based. Choppa wrote most of the song, including the hook. Beginning from the line "Before you try rob, hit your knees and pray to Buddha", the rest of the song was a freestyle. He did a melodic approach to the song as he wanted to use a different style.

== Critical reception ==
Alex Zidel of HotNewHipHop gave the song a "Hottttt" rating and wrote, "Choppa seems to have his head screwed on straight, adding comical elements to his lyrics and promising that he'll never sell out for some quick money."

== Charts ==
Chart (2019)	Peak position
US Bubbling Under R&B/Hip-Hop Singles (Billboard)	10

== Certifications ==
Certifications for "Capo"
Region	Certification	Certified units/sales
New Zealand (RMNZ)	Gold	15,000^{‡}
^{‡} Sales+streaming figures based on certification alone.
