= Shotta Flow 3 =

2019 single by NLE Choppa

Single by NLE Choppa

from the album Top Shotta
- Released: July 19, 2019
- Length: 3:01
- Label: No Love
- Songwriter(s): Bryson Potts; Jose Reynoso-Contreras
- Producer(s): Hozay Beats

NLE Choppa singles chronology
"Get Like Me" (2019)	"Shotta Flow 3" (2019)	"Nolove Anthem" (2019)

Music video
- "Shotta Flow 3" on YouTube

"Shotta Flow 3" is a song by American rapper NLE Choppa, released on July 19, 2019, as the lead single from his debut studio album Top Shotta (2020). Produced by Hozay Beats, it is the third installment in the "Shotta Flow" song series.

== Music video ==
The music video was released alongside the single. It sees NLE Choppa and his crew showing off many dance moves, including "hitting the Woah" midair before belly-flopping into a pool.

== Charts ==
Chart (2019)	Peak position
US Bubbling Under Hot 100 Singles (Billboard)	19
US Bubbling Under R&B/Hip-Hop Singles (Billboard)	5

== Certifications ==
Region	Certification	Certified units/sales
Canada (Music Canada)	Platinum	80,000^{‡}
United States (RIAA)	Platinum	1,000,000^{‡}
^{‡} Sales+streaming figures based on certification alone.
