= Top Shotta (disambiguation) =

Top Shotta is a 2020 album by NLE Choppa.

Top Shotta may also refer to:

- Top Shotta, a 1999 compilation album by Lord Kossity
- "Top Shotta", a song by Pop Smoke from the 2020 album Faith

== See also ==
- "Top Shotter", a song by DMX, Sean Paul and Mr. Vegas from the 1998 soundtrack album Belly
