= YoungKio =

Dutch record producer (born 1999)

- Born: Kiowa Roukema; 3 December 1999 (age 26); Purmerend, Netherlands
- Genres: Hip hop; trap
- Occupations: Record producer; songwriter
- Instruments: FL Studio; Keyboard
- Years active: 2016–present
- Labels: Victor Victor; UMPG; Cash Gang

Kiowa Roukema (born 3 December 1999), professionally known as YoungKio, is a Dutch record producer and songwriter. He is best known for producing "Old Town Road", by American rapper Lil Nas X in 2019. Since the rise in popularity of "Old Town Road", YoungKio signed to Victor Victor Worldwide, Universal Music Publishing Group and French record producer CashMoneyAP's record label and production collective Cash Gang. He is of Surinamese descent.

== Career ==
Roukema first started producing beats in 2016. He began producing on the popular digital audio workstation FL Studio, which his friend gifted to him. Roukema's early and current influences include producers Wheezy and TM88. He later stated, "In my opinion, I became good at it pretty fast." He began posting his type beats on YouTube and sold leases for $30. With this money, he saved up to purchase a year-long membership to the beat store hosting platform BeatStars.

In 2018, one of Roukema's beats was leased by American rapper Lil Nas X for his song "Old Town Road". The beat sampled the 2008 Nine Inch Nails song "Ghost IV – 34". The song was released independently on December 3, 2018, and gained popularity on social video sharing app TikTok. Since the rise in popularity of "Old Town Road", Roukema has done interviews with Forbes, GQ, and many other publications. He has also flown to Los Angeles to work with producers like CashMoneyAP, and appeared in the "Old Town Road" music video. He has since been hired to produce beats for prominent artists like Lil Pump and Rico Nasty.

== Production discography ==
=== Charted singles ===
Title	Year	Peak chart positions										Certifications	Album
Title	Year	US	US R&B/HH	AUS	CAN	DEN	IRE	NOR	NZ	SWE	UK	Certifications	Album
"Old Town Road" (Lil Nas X either solo or remix featuring Billy Ray Cyrus)	2018	1	1	1	1	1	1	1	1	2	1	RIAA: 12× Platinum; ARIA: 11× Platinum; BPI: 3× Platinum; GLF: 2x P; IFPI DEN: Platinum; MC: Diamond; RMNZ: 4× Platinum	7
"Papi Chulo" (Octavian and Skepta)	2020	—	—	85	99	—	37	—	—	—	37		Alpha
"Burn the Hoods" (Ski Mask the Slump God)	2020	— (Note: "Burn the Hoods" did not enter the Billboard Hot 100, but peaked at number 22 on the Bubbling Under Hot 100 chart.)	—	—	—	—	—	—	—	—	—		Non-album single
"Jumpin" (NLE Choppa featuring Polo G)	2021	89	40	—	74	—	—	—	—	—	—		Me vs. Me
"Shotta Flow 6" (NLE Choppa)	2022	86	30	—	—	—	—	—	—	—	—		Me vs. Me
"Her" (Megan Thee Stallion)	2022	62	19	—	—	—	—	—	—	—	—		Traumazine
