= Final Warning =

(The) Final Warning may refer to:

- Final Warning (band), an American hardcore punk band
- Final Warning (NLE Choppa song), 2021
- Final Warning (Skylar Grey song), 2013
- Maximum Ride: The Final Warning, a 2008 novel in the Maximum Ride series by James Patterson
- Chernobyl: The Final Warning, a 1991 American made-for-television disaster drama film

== See also ==
- China's final warning
