= 6locc 6a6y =

2019 single by Lil Loaded

Single by Lil Loaded

from the album 6locc 6a6y and A Demon in 6lue
- Released: July 26, 2019
- Genre: Hip hop; drill
- Length: 2:11
- Label: Epic
- Songwriters: Dashawn Robertson; Tommy Franco
- Producer: Tommy Franco

Lil Loaded singles chronology
"Pacc In" (2019)	"6locc 6a6y" (2019)	"Smoke Today" (2019)

Music video
- "6locc 6a6y" on YouTube

"6locc 6a6y" (pronounced "block baby") is the debut single by American rapper Lil Loaded, released on July 26, 2019. It is his breakout song, immediately becoming a viral hit upon its release, and is the lead single from his 2019 debut mixtape of the same name. An official remix of the song featuring American rapper NLE Choppa was later released and served as the lead single from his debut studio album A Demon in 6lue (2020).

== Background ==
In the song, Lil Loaded raps about life in his hometown. In an interview with Genius, he said it "was really an anthem for me and a couple of my other partners. We are the babies of the hood. So they always showed us love and stuff." With respect to how the song came about, he stated:

I was on YouTube and I was listening to beats. And I came across that Tommy Franco beat. And I was just like, "Dang, it's hard." I was really looking for a Lil Baby beat, but it ended up being a chopper beat. I wasn't really drawn to chopper beats at first just because I don't like how simple the instruments are. But that one just, went crazy to me. And I was rapping to it, and then I was like, "Well, I'm going to go to the studio and do it" because I don't write. I just freestyle. So I just went to the studio, and I got in the booth and turned up.

After some delay, he uploaded the music video late at night on July 26, 2019. Shortly thereafter, YouTuber Tommy Craze was filming the second episode of his "Reacting To Music Videos With 0 VIEWS!" series and stumbled upon the video for the song. He was impressed by Lil Loaded's performance and the aesthetic of the video. The next morning, the video had reached 45,000 views. The song instantly became successful, soon leading to Loaded receiving calls from record labels and shout-outs from other rappers. It amassed millions of streams and views in a short period of time, helping Lil Loaded rise to prominence.

== Music video ==
The music video was filmed in a Dallas neighborhood, showing Lil Loaded and his friends flaunting their cash and handguns. Loaded later told Complex, "That was a wild day. During the video, fights was breaking out and shit. You feel it. You feel the real energy. That's really what was going on. That was a regular day in the hood."

== Remix ==
An official remix of the song featuring American rapper NLE Choppa was released on June 19, 2020. Its music video premiered on June 24, 2020 and was directed by Water Wippin Evan.

== Certifications ==
Region	Certification	Certified units/sales
Poland (ZPAV)	Gold	25,000^{‡}
United States (RIAA)	Gold	500,000^{‡}
^{‡} Sales+streaming figures based on certification alone.
