= Or What? =

2024 single by NLE Choppa and 41

Single by NLE Choppa and 41

from the EP Slut Szn
- Released: September 5, 2024
- Genre: Hip hop
- Length: 3:19
- Label: No Love; Warner
- Songwriters: Bryson Potts; Henry Fasheun; Jennifer Akpofure; Zaire Rivera; Evan Ellicott; Javier Mercado; Alexey Grachev
- Producers: Emrld; Synthetic; Sharkboy

NLE Choppa singles chronology
"Dump Truck 2.0" (2024)	"Or What?" (2024)	"Slut Me Out 3" (2024)

41 singles chronology
"Green Haired Girl" (2024)	"Or What" (2024)	"DV" (2024)

Music video
- "Or What" on YouTube

"Or What?" is a song by American rapper NLE Choppa and American hip hop group 41, released on September 5, 2024. Produced by Emrld, Synthetic and Sharkboy, it is 41's first song to reach the Billboard Hot 100, debuting at number 91. Rapper Travis Scott revealed that this is his favorite song of 2024.

== Background ==
According to Luminate, the song had amassed 5.7 million streams in the United States by the week of September 27-October 3, 2024, having soared by 79% in streams and 73% in the previous week. The success of the song is largely attributed to use on the video-sharing platform TikTok, on which it has soundtracked over 150,000 clips.

== Charts ==
=== Weekly charts ===
Weekly chart performance for "Or What"
Chart (2024)	Peak position
Canada Hot 100 (Billboard)	69
New Zealand Hot Singles (RMNZ)	14
US Billboard Hot 100	52
US Hot R&B/Hip-Hop Songs (Billboard)	9
US Rhythmic Airplay (Billboard)	21

=== Year-end charts ===
Year-end chart performance for "Or What"
Chart (2025)	Position
US Hot R&B/Hip-Hop Songs (Billboard)	60
