= 41 (group) =

American hip hop group

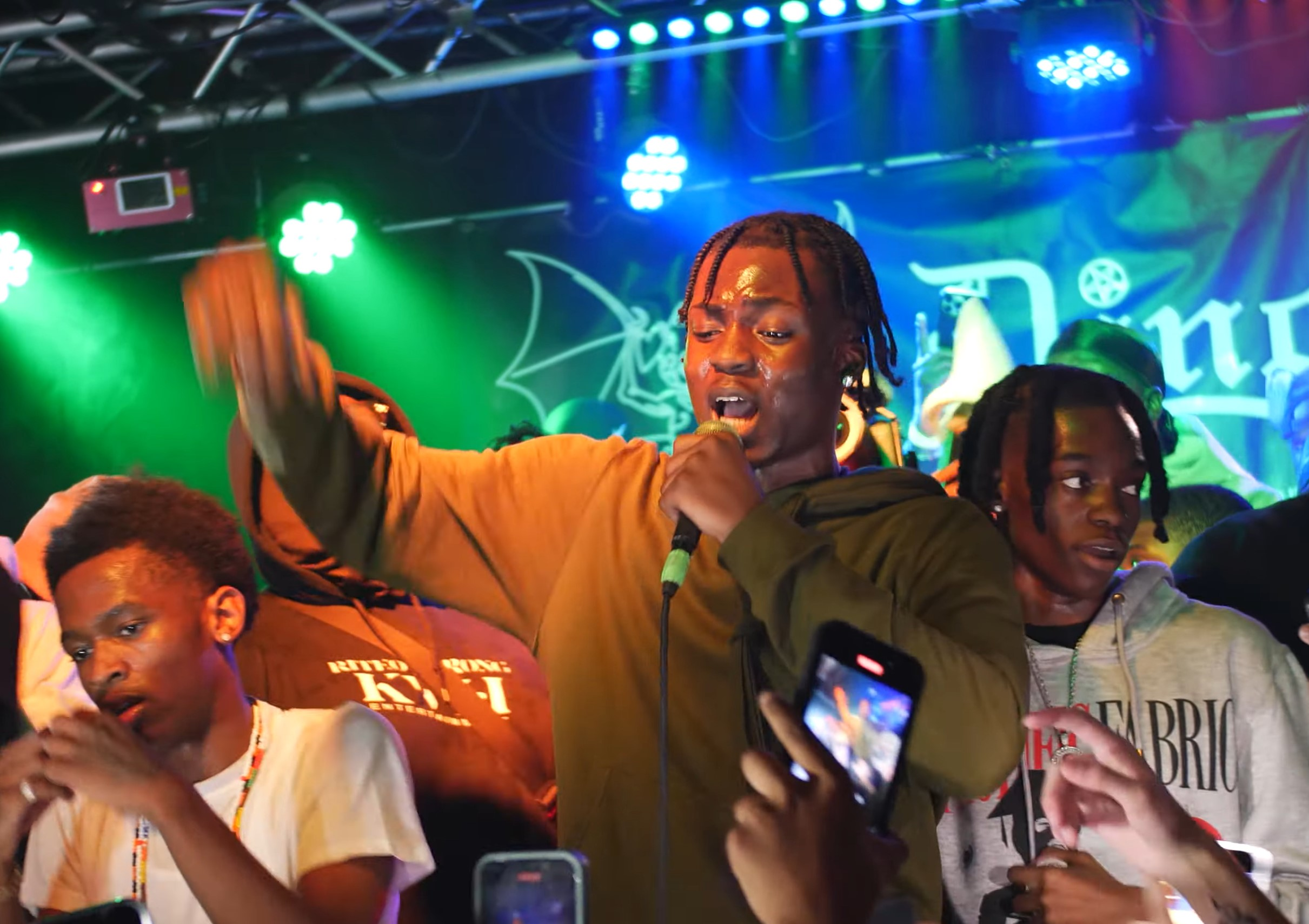
- 41 performing at Dingbatz in Clifton, New Jersey. From left: TaTa, Kyle Richh, and Jenn Carter.

Background information
- Origin: Brooklyn, New York City, U.S.
- Genres: Brooklyn drill; Jersey club
- Years active: 2022–present
- Label: Republic
- Members: Kyle Richh; Jenn Carter; TaTa

41 (pronounced "four one") is an American hip hop group founded in 2022 in Brooklyn. It consists of rappers Kyle Richh, Jenn Carter, and TaTa, who first began recording music together on BandLab during the COVID-19 pandemic.

In 2022, 41 signed to Republic Records and released the controversial single "Notti Bop", a diss track against rapper Notti Osama after he was fatally stabbed at 14 years old, which went viral on TikTok and YouTube for its associated dance trend parodying his stabbing. Their 2023 single "Bent", released as the lead single from their debut extended play, 41 World: Not the Album (2023), became their most successful song and charted on the Billboard Bubbling Under Hot 100 chart.

== History ==
Henry Olatunde Fasheun (Kyle Richh) and Jennifer Oghenekevwe Akpofure (Jenn Carter) grew up together in the Brownsville neighborhood of Brooklyn, where they were introduced to one another through their parents and attended middle school together. Richh first started rapping at age seven. Carter was later inspired by rapper Young M.A to start rapping at age 17 over 50 Cent beats using BandLab. The two first recorded songs together using the BandLab in 2020 during the beginning of the COVID-19 pandemic. They were introduced to Zaire Tysean Rivera (TaTa), who was also raised in Brownsville, through their mutual friend Dee Billz in 2021 and the three had a studio session together.

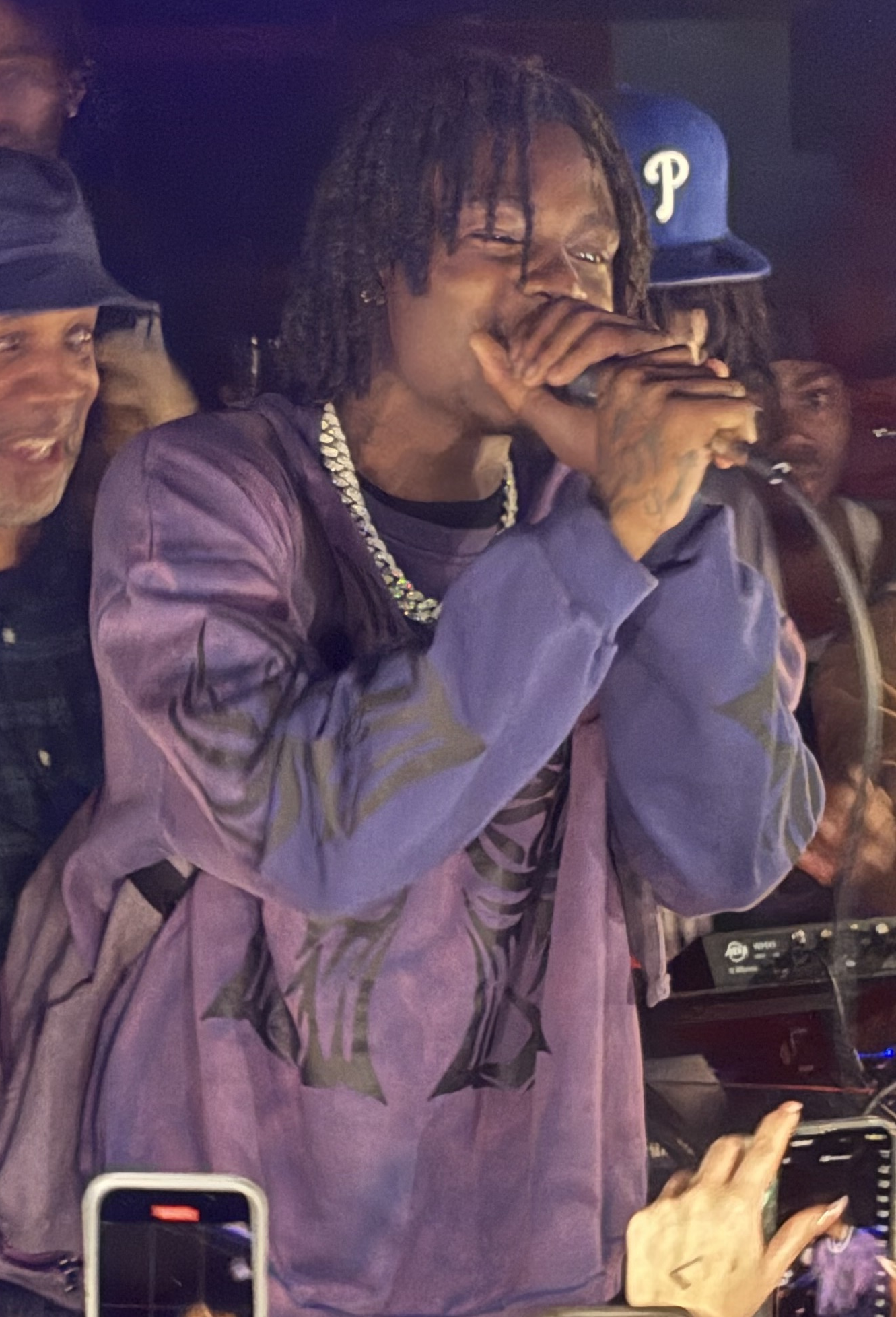
Kyle Richh performing in State College, Pennsylvania in 2024

41 released their debut single, "41 Cypher", in January 2022. It accrued six million views on YouTube by 2024. In May 2022, 41 appeared on the cypher series On the Radar; their episode, by 2023, was the most-watched episode of the series, with 18 million views. Alphonse Pierre of Pitchfork identified it as their breakout moment and credited them with reviving the Brooklyn drill scene in 2022. They signed to Republic Records by July 2022 and found further prominence with the October 2022 release of their song "Notti Bop", a diss track against slain 14-year-old rapper Notti Osama that sampled the Backyardigans song "Castaways", with an accompanying TikTok dance that mimicked Notti Osama's stabbing. It went viral on TikTok and on YouTube, where it was the top trending video on the site before being removed after Sony Music copyright struck it for its uncleared sample of "Castaways". It became controversial among critics and on social media, with Rolling Stone's Andre Gee criticizing it as "a callous mockery of what happened to [Notti Osama]" and Jody Rosen of The New Yorker writing that it "stands out in its capacity—its eagerness—to appall". Alphonse Pierre of Pitchfork called it "a new low" for drill music and "attention-hungry".

41 soon transitioned to more party-oriented music, such as their Jersey club-influenced 2023 single "Bent", which peaked at number 18 on Billboard's Bubbling Under Hot 100 chart and received over 100 million streams on Spotify by 2025. A remix of "Bent" featuring rapper Sexyy Red was also released, and Kyle Denis of Billboard wrote that it and 41's song "Jenn Jenn Jenn" were two of "[2023's] defining regional hits". They released their debut mixtape, 41 Ways, in the spring of 2023, and their debut extended play (EP), 41 World: Not the Album, on November 30, 2023, with "Bent" as its lead single. They were featured on Fivio Foreign single "Get Deady", released in late 2023, and on the French Montana song "Too Fun" from his February 2024 mixtape Mac & Cheese 5. 41 were nominated for the BET Award for Best New Artist in 2024. Richh was featured on the Megan Thee Stallion song "B.A.S." from her album Megan, released in June 2024. Later in the year, they collaborated with rapper NLE Choppa on the track "Or What", which became 41's first charting hit on the Billboard Hot 100, peaking at #52.

On 3 April 2026, 41 released their debut studio album, "AREA 41" with guest appearances from G Herbo, NLE Choppa, Cash Cobain, ZEDDY WILL, Fivio Foreign, BabyChiefDoit, Capella Grey and Fabolous.

== Discography ==
=== Studio Albums ===
List of albums
Title	Album details
AREA 41	Released: April 3, 2026; Label: Republic; Format: Digital download, streaming

=== Mixtapes ===
List of mixtapes
Title	Album details
41 Ways	Released: April 1, 2023; Label: Republic; Format: Digital download, streaming

=== Extended plays ===
List of extended plays
Title	Album details
41 World: Not the Album	Released: November 17, 2023; Label: Republic; Format: Digital download, streaming

=== Singles ===
==== As lead artist ====
List of singles as lead artist, with selected chart positions, showing year released and album name
Title	Year	Peak chart positions			Album
Title	Year	US Bub.	US HH/ R&B	Layla	Album
"41 Shots" (with Rico Beats)	2022	—	—	—	Non-album single
"Deuce"	2022	—	—	—	41 Ways
"Penthouse"	2023	—	—	—	Non-album single
"To Whom It May Concern" (with Touchamill)	2023	—	—	—	41 Ways
"Reverse" (featuring 2Rare)	2023	—	—	—	Non-album singles
"Fetty"	2023	—	—	—	Non-album singles
"Bent"	2023	18	37	35	41 World: Not the Album
"Jenn Jenn Jenn"	2023	—	—	—	Non-album single
"Stomp Stomp" (with Dee Billz)	2023	—	—	—	41 World: Not the Album
"Get Deady"	2023	—	—	—	41 World: Not the Album
"Trick"	2024	—	—	—	Non-album singles
"Birthday" (featuring TaTa)	2024	—	—	—	Non-album singles
"Tweak"	2024	—	—	—	Non-album singles
"Hate The Real"	2024	—	—	—	Non-album singles
"If You a Baddie"	2024	—	—	—	Non-album singles
"Sundress" (featuring Bay Swag)	2024	—	—	—	Non-album singles
"Karma" (featuring G5AZO)	2024	—	—	—	Non-album singles
"UNFADEABLE"	2024	—	—	—	Non-album singles
"PSA"	2024	—	—	—	Non-album singles
"Got Me Started"	2024	—	—	—	Non-album singles
"Green Haired Girl" (featuring Dee Billz)	2024	—	—	—	Non-album singles
"Or What" (with NLE Choppa)	2024	—	9	21	Non-album singles
"Maintenance Man" (featuring Nemzzz and Dee Billz)	2024	—	—	—	Non-album singles
"Closure"	2024	—	—	—	Non-album singles
"Vibes"	2024	—	—	—	Non-album singles
"Split" (featuring Kyle Richh and Skilla Baby)	2024	—	—	—	Non-album singles
"Chill Guy" (featuring Kyle Richh, see also "Chill Guy")	2024	—	—	—	Non-album singles
"Presidential"	2025	—	—	—	Non-album singles
"Time Out"	2025	—	—	—	Non-album singles
"Click It"	2025	—	—	—	Non-album singles
"4 Doors" (featuring Bay Swag & D Lou)	2025	—	—	—	Non-album singles
"No Love"	2025	—	—	—	Non-album singles
"Pucci" (with Zeddy Will)	2025	—	—	—	AREA 41
"Pilates"	2025	—	—	—	AREA 41
"Lisp"	2025	—	—	—	Non-album singles
"Buckets"	2025	—	—	—	Non-album singles
"Spleen"	2025	—	—	—	Non-album singles
"Bad Bitch"	2026	—	—	—	AREA 41

==== As featured artist ====
List of singles as featured artist, showing year released and album name
Title	Year	Album
"Becky" (Lola Brooke featuring 41)	2024	Dennis Daughter (Deluxe Version)
"Too Fun" (French Montana featuring 41)	2024	Mac & Cheese 5
"Get Deady" (Fivio Foreign featuring 41)	2024	Pain & Love 2
