= Mac & Cheese 5 =

Mixtape by French Montana
- Released: February 23, 2024
- Genre: Hip-hop
- Length: 64:05
- Label: Coke Boys; Gamma.
- Producer: French Montana; ADHD; ATL Jacob; BoogzDaBeast; Buda & Grandz; Butter Beats; Chibu; Daniel Upchurch; DBurns; Dem Jointz; DJ Ever B; DJ Rocco; DLS; Doc McKinney; Dson Beats; Duce.6x; Dxor; Evrgrn; FortyOneSix; Go Grizzly; Hendrix Smoke; Illangelo; Kofo; LaSource; Pooh Beatz; Produced by JB; Royal808; Saint Vincent; Sam Sneak; StoopidOnDaBeat; Synthetic; TayDaProducer; TooDope; TT Audi; Yo Benji; Yonatan; Yosh Beats

French Montana chronology
Coke Boys 6 (2023)	Mac & Cheese 5 (2024)

Singles from Mac & Cheese 5
- 1. "Okay" Released: December 8, 2023

Mac & Cheese 5 is the twenty-third mixtape by Moroccan-American rapper French Montana. It was released through Coke Boys Records and Gamma on February 23, 2024. The mixtape features collaborations and guest appearances from Amber Run, Kanye West, Saint Jhn, Buju Banton, Rick Ross, Lil Wayne, Lil Baby, ATL Jacob, Westside Gunn, 41, JID, Lil Durk, Jeremih, Bryson Tiller, Meek Mill, and Mikky Ekko. The deluxe edition was released five days later and features an additional guest appearance from DThang. Production was handled by Montana and ATL Jacob themselves, alongside Dem Jointz, Doc McKinney, and Illangelo, among others. The mixtape was supported by its only single, "Okay".

== Background and release ==
In an interview with the Breakfast Club the day that the mixtape was released, Montana spoke about why he released it:

I feel like I needed to get everything out the way then go back to the mixtape vibes. I always try to go where the puck is going, not where the puck is at. I feel like the game needs mixtapes. That feeling isn't there anymore. Albums is dope [sic] everybody's getting used to it, but I want to hear [Lil] Wayne mixtapes, Rick Ross Rich Forever mixtapes, Wiz Khalifa [Kush & Orange Juice] mixtapes. I just want to get back to that vibe and I want to lead the way with the mixtapes.

The mixtape was originally supposed to be released on January 5, 2024, but was delayed for unknown reasons. A day before its original release date, Westside Gunn posted the original tracklist on Instagram, notably featuring "Another One of Me", a Diddy single featuring Montana and the Weeknd, who is sampled on "Where We Came From". Montana also garnered negative attention for allegedly manipulating music charts by releasing 126 songs in total of the mixtape, which includes the regular songs and a sped-up, slowed-down, instrumental, and a cappella versions of each song, clocking in at just over six hours in total. He later responded to the allegation and shared why he made that decision in an interview with TMZ:

Taylor Swift dropped eight versions of her album. I'm just learning the hustle from them. I dropped five versions...My fans always love my beats so I dropped the instrumental. I dropped a capella for all the DJs that like blending and I dropped clean. I dropped the sped-up one because of TikTok, and I dropped the chopped and screwed. So people can stop asking me for all different types of versions, and I guess all those songs equaled out to 126 songs. I was watching everybody doing it. I was watching JT [Justin Timberlake] and a bunch of other people who had big records, and I see them just put out instrumentals and all that. I'm like, how come it's so easy to find this, and when I went on their page, and I saw they had six different versions, I was like, they're geniuses.

In January 2024, French Montana allegedly sold pre-ordered vinyl records of the then-upcoming mixtape for $5. According to the website, all pre-orders were scheduled to ship on February 23, 2024, the scheduled release date. However, customers discovered that the Vinyl's shipping claimed to be shipped to an arbitrary address. Consequently, none of the purchasers received the vinyl at their homes. Many theories speculate that this incident was intended to boost the mixtape's sales numbers.

== Critical reception ==
Professional ratings
Review scores
Source	Rating
HipHopDX	3.6/5
AllMusic	3/5 stars

Scott Glaysher of HipHopDX gave the album a 3.6/5, saying: "Mac & Cheese 5 still has far too many "Haaaaan" ad-libs to win a Pulitzer but, with said, it will go down as one of French's best projects in quite some time".

A TiVo staff member reviewed the mixtape on AllMusic about the mixtape, stating:

The official standard version of the album boasts a lengthy guest list of famous names, with Kanye West dropping by for both the spirited "Stand United" and the battle-cry aggression of "Where They At." Rick Ross is on multiple tracks, and there are features throughout from Lil Wayne, Buju Banton, Lil Durk, Lil Baby, Bryson Tiller, and many others. JID's fluid verses add Southern personality to the otherwise Drake-indebted "Praise God," and the poppier moments are balanced out by hard East coast-styled rap bangers like "Money Ain't a Thing," slithering trap in the form of "Okay," and party-starting hype-ups like the chant-able "Millionaire Row."

With this review they gave the mixtape a rating of 3/5.

== Track listing ==
Mac & Cheese 5 track listing
No.	Title	Writer(s)	Producer(s)	Length
1.	"Dirty Bronx Intro" (with Amber Run)	Karim Kharbouch; Juan Peters; Derek Burns, Jr.	French Montana; StoopidOnDaBeat; DBurns	3:31
2.	"Talk to Me"	Kharbouch; Jason Constantin; Dennis Lukowski; Hugo Cogne	Dson Beats; DLS; LaSource	3:15
3.	"Stand United" (with Kanye West and Saint Jhn featuring Buju Banton)	Kharbouch; Ye; Carlos Phillips; Mark Myrie; Dwayne Abernathy; Jahmal Gwin	Dem Jointz; BoogzDaBeast	2:43
4.	"Splash Brothers" (with Rick Ross and Lil Wayne)	Kharbouch; William Roberts III; Dwayne Carter, Jr.; Amman Nurani; Joshua Veysey; Justin Bradbury; Oliver El-Khatib	Evrgrn; Yosh Beats; Produced by JB	3:41
5.	"Okay" (with Lil Baby and ATL Jacob)	Kharbouch; Dominique Jones; Jacob Canady; Lesidney Ragland; Derrick Miller; Felix Roggenkämper; Pepijn Baltus	ATL Jacob; TooDope; Hendrix Smoke; Royal808; Duce.6x	3:12
6.	"Casino Life 3"	Kharbouch; Samir Akhter	ADHD	2:33
7.	"Where They At" (with Kanye West and Westside Gunn)	Kharbouch; Ye; Alvin Worthy; Abernathy; Gwin	Dem Jointz; BoogzDaBeast	2:53
8.	"Skit"	Kharbouch		1:27
9.	"Too Fun" (with Kyle Richh and Jenn Carter)	Kharbouch; Olatunde Fasheun; Jennifer Akpofure; Zaire Rivera; Moises Robalo; Raymond McNeil; Derrick Milano	Synthetic; Saint Vincent; TayDaProducer	3:27
10.	"Facts"	Kharbouch; Darryl Clemons; Kevin Price; Daz Johnson	Pooh Beatz; Go Grizzly	2:15
11.	"Praise God" (with JID)	Kharbouch; Destin Route; Sbusiso Kunene	Dxor	3:14
12.	"Money Ain't a Thing" (with Lil Durk)	Kharbouch; Durk Banks; Akhter	ADHD	3:13
13.	"Goals" (with Jeremih)	Kharbouch; Jeremy Felton; Jahron Brathwaite; Derrick Williams; Michael Johnson; Daniel Garcia; Francis Ubiera	Buda & Grandz	3:37
14.	"Other Side"	Kharbouch; Milano; Benjamin Ibrahimovic; Kasper Knudsen; Anders Christiansen; Nicolai Andersen	Yo Benji; UpNorth	2:10
15.	"Fake Friends" (with Bryson Tiller)	Kharbouch; Bryson Tiller; Jordan Holt-May	TT Audi	2:51
16.	"Where We Came From"	Kharbouch; Abel Tesfaye; Martin McKinney; Carlo Montagnese	French Montana; Doc McKinney; Illangelo	1:52
17.	"Made It in USA"	Kharbouch; Peters; Anthony Jimenez	StoopidOnDaBeat; Butter Beats	2:37
18.	"Millionaire Row" (with Rick Ross)	Kharbouch; Roberts; Peters; Jimenez; Bohdan Budnyk; Kyrylo Budnyk; Samuel Saint Jean	French Montana; StoopidOnDaBeat; DJ Ever B; DJ Rocco; Sam Sneak	2:46
19.	"Ride the Wave"	Kharbouch; Peters	French Montana; StoopidOnDaBeat	1:50
20.	"Back in Style" (interlude)	Kharbouch; Andre Robertson; Kevin Ekofo; Daniel Upchurch; Jason Hernandez; Yonatan Watts; Celestine Amajoyi	Bizness Boi; Kofo; Upchurch; FortyOneSix; Yonatan; Chibu	2:48
21.	"Documentary" (with Mikky Ekko)	Kharbouch; John Sudduth		4:09
Total length:				60:16

Deluxe bonus track
No.	Title	Writer(s)	Producer(s)	Length
22.	"Too Fun" (remix; with Kyle Richh, Jenn Carter, and DThang featuring 41)	Kharbouch; Fasheun; Akpofure; Daniel Collins; Rivera; Robalo; McNeil; Milano	Synthetic; Saint Vincent; TayDaProducer	3:51
Total length:				64:05

Notes

- "Where We Came From" contains samples from an unreleased song, "Marylyn (Witches and Panthers)", written by The Weeknd, Doc McKinney, and Illangelo, and performed by the former.

== Charts ==
Chart performance for Mac & Cheese 5
Chart (2024)	Peak position
US Billboard 200	14
US Independent Albums (Billboard)	2
US Top R&B/Hip-Hop Albums (Billboard)	5
