= Famous Hoes =

2019 single by NLE Choppa

Single by NLE Choppa
- Released: December 10, 2019
- Length: 2:15
- Label: No Love Entertainment; Warner
- Songwriters: Bryson Potts; Alex Petit; Alecto; Kai
- Producers: CashMoneyAP; Alecto; Kai

NLE Choppa singles chronology
| "Dekario" (2019) | "Famous Hoes" (2019) | "Side" (2019) |

Music video
- "Famous Hoes" on YouTube

"Famous Hoes" is a single by American rapper NLE Choppa, released on December 10, 2019 along with a music video. The song was produced by CashMoneyAP, Alecto and Kai.

== Composition ==
The chorus of the song finds NLE Choppa melodically reflecting over making his girlfriend famous and then being rejected by her. The outro of the song warns his enemies to not "pull up" on his street.

== Charts ==
| Chart (2019) | Peak position |
|---|---|
| Canada Hot 100 (Billboard) | 95 |
| US Billboard Hot 100 | 83 |
| US Hot R&B/Hip-Hop Songs (Billboard) | 36 |

== Certifications ==
| Region | Certification | Certified units/sales |
|---|---|---|
| United States (RIAA) | Platinum | 1,000,000^{‡} |
^{‡} Sales+streaming figures based on certification alone.
