= Gangstas (song) =

2020 song by Pop Smoke

Song by Pop Smoke

from the album Shoot for the Stars, Aim for the Moon
- Released: July 3, 2020
- Genre: Trap
- Length: 2:40
- Label: Victor Victor; Republic
- Songwriters: Bashar Jackson; Alex Petit; Ellis Newton
- Producers: CashMoneyAP; Swirv

"Gangstas" is a song by American rapper Pop Smoke from his posthumous debut studio album, Shoot for the Stars, Aim for the Moon (2020), released through Victor Victor Worldwide and Republic Records. The song was written by Pop Smoke, alongside its producers, CashMoneyAP and Swirv. A trap and R&B song, its lyrics reflect on Pop Smoke claiming to be the King of New York and expressing his dislike for fellow American rapper 6ix9ine.

Upon its release, the song received generally positive reviews from music critics, with many comparing Pop Smoke's vocals to those of 50 Cent and saying it has G-Unit vibes. Commercially, the song reached number 37 on the US Billboard Hot 100, while peaking within the top 30 in Switzerland and peaking within the top 20 in Canada. The song also charted in Australia, France, and Sweden, and was certified Gold in France, Italy, and Poland and Silver in the United Kingdom.

== Background and recording ==
Pop Smoke and his team were in the Bahamas recording songs mostly intended for his second mixtape Meet the Woo 2 (2020). English producer Swirv said that Pop Smoke had saved a few songs for the album and remembered that the last song he recorded with him was "Gangstas" before his death. According to CashMoneyAP, he worked on the song's drums, while Swirv worked on the melodies, before Pop Smoke recorded his vocals. Swirv recalled they were trying to find a melody for a different song called "Hotel Lobby", with the producer saying it had a 50 Cent vibe. He was trying some different drill beats but said it did not feel the same. Then he remembered that he had made another beat a couple of months before, and stated it also had a 50 Cent vibe. Pop Smoke liked the beat so much that he wanted to make a completely separate song; CashMoneyAP remembered they started recording the song very late at night. Pop Smoke did not want to leave until the song was finished. While the rapper was working on it, CashMoneyAP was handling post-production of the beat, because it just had keys. He wanted to add something that was going to bring a gangster to feel to it, so he decided to add some strings to the song. The song was written by Pop Smoke, known as Bashar Jackson, alongside CashMoneyAP and Swirv, who have the real names of Alex Petit and Ellis Newton, respectively. The song was produced by CashMoneyAP and Smirv.

== Music and lyrics ==
Musically, "Gangstas" is an R&B track. Roisin O'Connor of The Independent mentioned that the song has "minor piano keys looped" while Pop Smoke recalls "the soft danger" of Travis Scott's "5% Tint" (2018). Slant Magazine's Charles Lyons-Burt said that "Gangstas" contains a "minimalist piano and snare combination". Earmilk's Ashton Howard stated that Pop Smoke "provides what sounds like an unreleased track" from the sessions from rapper 50 Cent's debut studio album Get Rich or Die Tryin' (2003). Hannah Giorgis of The Atlantic commented that song finds Pop Smoke "characteristically gruff and cocksure".

NME's Dhruva Balram stated the song has a "haunting piano intro, singed synths maintain that early threat while Pop Smoke delivers his best claim yet to be the King of New York "Know what I'm sayin'? (I be in New York with the gangsters)/This the real streets shit, yeah, nigga/(I be in New York with the gangsters)/Fuckin' voice of the streets, man." According to A.D. Amorosi of Variety, Pop Smoke raps about owning the streets of New York: "Voice of the streets, man/It's like Jesus walkin'/More Christopher Walken". At the beginning of the song, Pop Smoke raps about not liking fellow rapper 6ix9ine: "On set that's some real shit nigga/I don't want none of that extra loud shit/This ain't none of that rainbow hair shit/this the real straight shit." Wongo Okon of Uproxx wrote that Pop Smoke "present[s] hard-nosed efforts that creep around the alleyways under the moon unfazed by the danger that lays ahead".

== Release and reception ==
On July 3, 2020, "Gangstas" was released as the fifth track on Pop Smoke's posthumous debut studio album Shoot for the Stars, Aim for the Moon. Briana Younger of NPR opined that Pop Smoke sounds a lot like 50 Cent in the song. Amorosi stated that the song is "as haunting as its lyrics". He continued, saying that "it's [Pop] Smoke's melodic sensibility that makes 'Gangstas' chorus poignant and memorable", and called it "the feel-bad hit of the summer". Gary Suarez of Entertainment Weekly depicted the song has "next-generation G-Unit vibes". In his review for Clash, Mike Milenko commented that Pop Smoke's "mesmerizing flow almost seems to imitate" a young 50 Cent. David Arron Blake of HipHopDX said the "floating piano chords and rough bars on 'Gangstas' could have easily come from a 50 Cent or G-Unit album, and match Pop [Smoke's] proven aesthetic surprisingly well".

Balram wrote the song is a "clear shot at [...] 6ix9ine's questionable self-claim to be the king of the city", and that Pop Smoke "comes back from the grave here to correct anyone who might be thinking that he won't live on in memory". David Crone of AllMusic said the song "provides a refreshing change of pace for the Brooklyn star". M.T. Richards for Consequence of Sound said that Pop Smoke "proves on 'Gangstas' that he can sing a hook with the best of them". In his review for Billboard magazine, Christine Werthman opined that the song "is the combo, tough on the outside, melodic on the inside, with a sub-three-minute delivery and a hometown shoutout on the chorus that'll make hearts swell". In a negative review, Paul Thompson of GQ criticized that the song "could have been pulled from any mid-period G-Unit album, with a staid piano line that gestures at menace but can't summon the energy required to sell it". Lyons-Burt said the song's "production feels mournful rather than charged".

Following the release of Shoot for the Stars, Aim for the Moon, the song debuted and peaked at number 37 on the US Billboard Hot 100. It also peaked at number 18 on the US Hot R&B/Hip-Hop Songs chart. The song further peaked at number 16 in Canada, number 66 in Australia, number 28 in Switzerland, number 54 in France, and number 79 in Sweden.

== Credits and personnel ==
Credits adapted from Tidal.

- Pop Smoke – vocals, songwriter
- CashMoneyAP – production, programming, songwriter
- Swirv – production, programming, songwriter
- Jess Jackson – mixing engineer, mastering engineer
- Corey Nutile – programming
- Rose Adams – assistant mixing engineer
- Sage Skofield – assistant mixing engineer
- Sean Solymar – assistant mixing engineer

== Charts ==
Weekly chart performance for "Gangstas"
Chart (2020)	Peak position
Australia (ARIA)	66
Canada Hot 100 (Billboard)	16
France (SNEP)	54
Sweden (Sverigetopplistan)	79
Switzerland (Schweizer Hitparade)	28
US Billboard Hot 100	37
US Hot R&B/Hip-Hop Songs (Billboard)	18

== Certifications ==
Certifications for "Gangstas"
Region	Certification	Certified units/sales
France (SNEP)	Gold	100,000^{‡}
Italy (FIMI)	Gold	50,000^{‡}
Poland (ZPAV)	Gold	25,000^{‡}
United Kingdom (BPI)	Silver	200,000^{‡}
^{‡} Sales+streaming figures based on certification alone.
