= Shotta Flow 2 =

2019 single by NLE Choppa

Single by NLE Choppa
- Released: February 16, 2019
- Length: 2:13
- Label: No Love
- Songwriter(s): Bryson Potts; Raymond Gonzales
- Producer(s): Khroam

NLE Choppa singles chronology
"Walk It Out" (2019)	"Shotta Flow 2" (2019)	"Hit the Scene" (2019)

Music video
- "Shotta Flow 2" on YouTube

"Shotta Flow 2" is a single by American rapper NLE Choppa, released on February 16, 2019 and produced by Khroam. It is the second installment in the "Shotta Flow" song series.

== Charts ==
Chart (2019)	Peak position
US Bubbling Under R&B/Hip-Hop Singles (Billboard)	9

== Certifications ==
Region	Certification	Certified units/sales
United States (RIAA)	Platinum	1,000,000^{‡}
^{‡} Sales+streaming figures based on certification alone.
