= Bent (41 song) =

2023 single by 41, Kyle Richh and Jenn Carter featuring Tata

Single by 41

from the EP 41 World: Not the Album
- Released: August 4, 2023
- Genre: Brooklyn drill
- Length: 2:40
- Label: RiteOrWrongKVH; Republic
- Songwriters: Henry Fasheun; Jennifer Akpofure; Zaire Rivera
- Producers: MCVertt; Synthetic

41 singles chronology
| "Fetty" (2023) | "Bent" (2023) | "Strangers" (2023) |

Music video
- "Bent" on YouTube

"Bent" is a song by American hip hop group 41, composed of rappers Kyle Richh, Jenn Carter and Tata. It was released on August 4, 2023, as the lead single from their EP 41 World: Not the Album (2023) and produced by MCVertt and Synthetic. An official remix of the song with American rapper Sexyy Red is featured on the EP. The track is considered the group's breakout hit and most successful song, amassing over 65 million streams by the end of 2023 and receiving nationwide radio airplay.

== Composition ==
"Bent" combines elements of drill and Jersey club, featuring drums of the latter style and "slow grooving" synthesizers. The rap performances have been described as combining the "brash, no-holds-barred delivery of DMX with the quick-based bullet point flow of contemporary New York drill stars like Fivio Foreign".

== Critical reception ==
Kyle Denis of Billboard commented the song "sits at the center of sample drill's danceability and genuinely impressive bars — an area in which Jenn Carter routinely shines brightest." Alphonse Pierre of Pitchfork wrote in his review of 41 World: Not the Album, "But there's nothing on 41 World comparable to lead single 'Bent,' one of the best New York rap songs of the year. Co-produced by L.A. journeyman Synthetic and MCVertt, one of the architects of the club rap revival in Newark, it has the contagious, house party-ready bounce and homegrown soul missing from so many trend-chasing club and drill fusions. Throughout the nearly three-minute track, 41 are connected at the hip, and the energy never lets up. And, of course, at the end of the tape there's a remix with Sexyy Red tacked on that I'll probably never listen to again willingly. It gets in the way of the best thing Brooklyn drill has to offer right now: Kyle Richh, Jenn Carter, and TaTa just hot potatoing the mic around."

== Charts ==
Chart performance for "Bent"
| Chart (2023) | Peak position |
|---|---|
| US Bubbling Under Hot 100 Singles (Billboard) | 14 |
| US Hot R&B/Hip-Hop Songs (Billboard) | 37 |

== Certifications ==
Certifications for "Bent"
| Region | Certification | Certified units/sales |
|---|---|---|
| United States (RIAA) | Platinum | 1,000,000^{‡} |
^{‡} Sales+streaming figures based on certification alone.
