= Jumpin (NLE Choppa song) =

2021 single by NLE Choppa featuring Polo G

- Solo version cover

Single by NLE Choppa featuring Polo G

from the album Me vs. Me
- Released: November 5, 2021
- Length: 3:01
- Label: Warner
- Songwriters: Bryson Potts; Taurus Bartlett; Alex Petit; Kiowa Roukema; Carlos Muñoz; Carter Lang; Dylan de Graaff; Kaniel Castañeda; Freakonamics; Urstrulyxyz; Damico Hammel; Clibbo; Yume; Jordan Waré
- Producers: CashMoneyAP; YoungKio; Loshendrix; Moras; Clibbo; Damico; Yume; Urstrulyxyz; KanielTheOne; Carter Lang; Waré

NLE Choppa singles chronology
"Citi Trends" (2021)	"Jumpin" (2021)	"I.Y.B." (2021)

Polo G singles chronology
"Last One Standing" / "Want It All" (2021)	"Jumpin" (2021)	"Bad Man (Smooth Criminal)" (2021)

Alternate cover
- Solo version

Music video
- "Jumpin" on YouTube

"Jumpin" is a song by American rapper NLE Choppa featuring fellow American rapper Polo G. It was released by Warner Records on November 5, 2021, as the third single from the former's third mixtape, Me vs. Me.

== Background and composition ==
NLE Choppa announced the release of the single on October 29, 2021, exactly one week before its release. "Jumpin" has been described as "a stuttering crime-life stomper" with a "strong" chorus from NLE Choppa and "a cool forbidding melodic intensity" on Polo G's verse.

== Music video ==
A music video premiered alongside the release of the song on November 5, 2021. The video sees NLE Choppa and Polo G wearing ski masks and holding guns. They rob a bank and subsequently get caught by police. However, both artists escape with the money they stole. NLE Choppa ends up showing his group, which includes Polo G, six steps to do in order to commit the crime.

== Credits and personnel ==
Credits adapted from Tidal.

- NLE Choppa – lead vocals, songwriting
- Polo G – featured vocals, songwriting
- CashMoneyAP – production, songwriting
- YoungKio – production, songwriting
- Loshendrix – production, songwriting
- Daniel Moras – production, songwriting
- Yume – production, songwriting
- Carter Lang – co-production, songwriting
- Jordan Waré – co-production, songwriting
- Kaniel the One – songwriting
- Damico – songwriting
- Urstrulyxyz – songwriting
- Clibbo – songwriting
- Aaron Mattes – mixing, recording
- Tiernan Cranny – mixing assistance
- Chris Athens – mastering
- Dave Huffman – mastering assistance
- Harrison Holmes – mastering assistance

== Charts ==
Chart performance for "Jumpin"
Chart (2021–2022)	Peak position
Canada Hot 100 (Billboard)	74
New Zealand Hot Singles (RMNZ)	25
US Billboard Hot 100	89
US Hot R&B/Hip-Hop Songs (Billboard)	40
US Rhythmic Airplay (Billboard)	36

== Certifications ==
Certifications for "Jumpin"
Region	Certification	Certified units/sales
Canada (Music Canada)	Gold	40,000^{‡}
United States (RIAA)	Gold	500,000^{‡}
^{‡} Sales+streaming figures based on certification alone.
