= KO (song) =

Single by NLE the Great
- Released: October 30, 2025
- Length: 3:34
- Label: Warner Music Group
- Producers: Charley Cooks; Aaron Mattes

NLE the Great singles chronology
"Messiah (Devil's Diss)" (2025)	"KO" (2025)

"KO" is a diss track by American rapper NLE the Great, released on October 30, 2025. The song serves as response to the ongoing beef between NLE Choppa and YoungBoy Never Broke Again. Written by Potts, "KO" was produced by himself alongside Charley Cooks and Aaron Mattes.

== Background and composition ==
The conflict between NLE Choppa and NBA Youngboy dates back to January 2022, when DJ Akademiks posted a tweet praising Youngboy for being "on demon time." Lil Reese responded, implying Youngboy was fraudulent, a statement Choppa agreed with. Choppa previously defended King Von and Lil Durk, with whom Youngboy had dissed prior. Six days later, Youngboy released the diss track "Know Like I Know" from the deluxe version of his sixteenth solo mixtape Colors. Later that same month, Choppa got into a scuffle at the Los Angeles International Airport with an alleged fan of NBA YoungBoy, though Choppa claimed that wasn't the case.

"KO" takes inspiration from 2Pac's 1996 diss track "Hit 'Em Up", using the same sample. On the track, Choppa addresses Youngboy's public image and his impact on the younger generation, calling him the devil's "king". The cover art features Choppa holding Youngboy's severed head. The music video, directed by Choppa and Michael Jackson choreographer Travis Payne, pays homage to Jackson, Prince, Muhammad Ali, and Mike Tyson. It portrays a Youngboy-esque figure as weak and shivering. The end of the video depicts him being tossed into a grave.

== Charts ==
Chart performance for "KO"
Chart (2025)	Peak position
US Bubbling Under Hot 100 (Billboard)	4
US Hot R&B/Hip-Hop Songs (Billboard)	27
US Rhythmic Airplay (Billboard)	28
