= Cottonwood (EP) =

2019 extended play by NLE Choppa

EP by NLE Choppa
- Released: December 23, 2019
- Genre: Hip hop
- Length: 25:06
- Producers: Asoteric; Ben Stancombe; CashMoneyAP; DracoKid; Foster; HeyMcNab; Magestick; Midas800; Murda Beatz; Pyroman; R Vintage; TnTXD; Turbo; Yung Lando; Yung Tago

NLE Choppa chronology
Cottonwood (2019)	Top Shotta (2020)

Singles from Cottonwood
- 1. "Shotta Flow" Released: January 17, 2019; 2. "Shotta Flow (Remix)" Released: June 20, 2019; 3. "Side" Released: December 13, 2019

Cottonwood is the debut EP by American rapper NLE Choppa. It was released on December 23, 2019, through UnitedMasters and NLE Choppa Entertainment. His second studio album titled Cottonwood 2, released on April 14, 2023, serves as the sequel to the EP.

The EP features two guest appearances from rappers Blueface and Meek Mill, and is supported by three singles: "Shotta Flow", its remix and "Side".

== Background ==
NLE Choppa went viral in January 2019, following the release of his breakthrough single "Shotta Flow", which peaked at number 36 on the US Billboard Hot 100. He first mentioned the EP in an October 2019 interview, and confirmed its release date on December 13. The title of the EP is a tribute to the street he grew up in located in Memphis.

== Short film ==
The EP was accompanied by a short film of the same name that was released on YouTube. Its announcement was accompanied by the release of the trailer.

== Singles ==
The first single, "Shotta Flow", was released on January 17, 2019 and peaked at number 36 on the US Billboard Hot 100. A remix for the track featuring Blueface, was released as the second single on June 20 of the same year. Two music videos for both the original song and its remix, were subsequently released, with the latter being directed by Cole Bennett.

The third single, "Side", was released on December 13, 2019.

== Track listing ==
Credits adapted from Tidal.

No.	Title	Writer(s)	Producer(s)	Length
1.	"Untold"	Bryson Potts; Alex Petit; Andre Neves; David Veiga; Nicolas Zita	CashMoneyAP; Magestick; Pyroman	2:34
2.	"Step"	Potts; Raphael Udo III	DracoKid	2:39
3.	"Side"	Potts; Petit	CashMoneyAP	2:28
4.	"Clicc Clacc"	Potts; Shane Lindstrom; Zachary Foster	Murda Beatz; Foster	1:54
5.	"Matrix"	Potts; Anton Kuehl-Joergensen; Benjamin Stancombe	Asoteric; Ben Stancombe	2:05
6.	"N.W.A."	Potts; Thomas Horton; Aaron Tago; Orlando Brossie	TnTXD; Yung Tago; Yung Lando	2:31
7.	"Chances"	Potts; Jermaine Smith	R Vintage	2:12
8.	"Shotta Flow"	Potts; Donald Bailey, Jr.	Midas800	2:40
9.	"Shotta Flow (Remix)" (featuring Blueface)	Potts; Johnathan Porter; Bailey	Midas800	2:57
10.	"Cruze" (featuring Meek Mill)	Potts; Robert Williams; Chandler Durham; Brandon McNab	Turbo; HeyMcNab	3:06
Total length:				25:06

Notes

- "Matrix" was originally present with initial production by Wheezy, and was later removed from streaming platforms due to sample clearance issues, but later reinstated with alternative production.

== Charts ==
Chart (2020)	Peak position
Canadian Albums (Billboard)	64
US Billboard 200	57
US Top R&B/Hip-Hop Albums (Billboard)	20

== Certifications ==
Region	Certification	Certified units/sales
Canada (Music Canada)	Gold	40,000^{‡}
United States (RIAA)	Gold	500,000^{‡}
^{‡} Sales+streaming figures based on certification alone.
