= Hello (Pop Smoke song) =

2021 single by Pop Smoke featuring A Boogie wit da Hoodie

Single by Pop Smoke featuring A Boogie wit da Hoodie

from the album Shoot for the Stars, Aim for the Moon (Deluxe)
- Released: February 9, 2021
- Recorded: 2019 – 2020
- Genre: Trap
- Length: 3:09
- Label: Victor Victor; Republic
- Songwriters: Bashar Jackson; Artist Dubose; Alex Petit; Ricardo Lamarre; Steven Victor; Jason Avalos
- Producers: CashMoneyAP; Rico Beats

Pop Smoke singles chronology
"Black Mask" / "Double G" (2020)	"Hello" (2021)	"AP" (2021)

A Boogie wit da Hoodie singles chronology
"Flood My Wrist" (2020)	"Hello" (2021)	"Track Star (Remix)" (2021)

"Hello" is a song by American rapper Pop Smoke featuring fellow American rapper A Boogie wit da Hoodie, from the deluxe edition of the former's posthumous debut studio album, Shoot for the Stars, Aim for the Moon (2020) as well as the EP For The Night (2020). It was written by the two artists alongside Steven Victor, Jason Avalos, and the song's producers, CashMoneyAP and Rico Beats. "Hello" was released as the sixth single from the album on February 9, 2021, by Victor Victor Worldwide and Republic Records.

The song features a piano, strings, and drum instrumentation. In the lyrics, Pop Smoke references basketball player Manu Ginóbili and A Boogie wit da Hoodie declares himself the king of New York City while stating that Pop Smoke would also hold that title if he were still alive. It peaked at number 83 on the US Billboard Hot 100 while reaching the top-40 of charts in Greece and Canada. The song was certified platinum in the United States by the Recording Industry Association of America (RIAA).

== Background and release ==
Pop Smoke's manager Steven Victor first announced on July 8, 2020, through his Twitter account that a song with A Boogie wit da Hoodie was coming out. "Hello" was released on the deluxe edition of the Pop Smoke's posthumous debut studio album, Shoot for the Stars, Aim for the Moon (2020), as the thirtieth track on July 20, 2020. The song was later serviced to US rhythmic contemporary radio as the sixth single from the album on February 9, 2021, by Victor Victor Worldwide and Republic Records. The song was written by Pop Smoke and A Boogie wit da Hoodie, who are credited under their legal names of Bashar Jackson and Julius Dubose, alongside Victor, Jason Avalos, Alex Petit and Ricardo Lamarre. The track was produced by the latter two, respectively known as CashMoneyAP and Rico Beats.

== Composition and reception ==
According to Mitch Findlay of HotNewHipHop, the production of "Hello" consists of an "oppressive drumline, juxtaposed beautifully over an emotional blend of piano and string". Pop Smoke references basketball player Manu Ginóbili, who played for the San Antonio Spurs, in the songs lyrics rapping: "I like my bitches redbone, ass fat, jello, Lightskin, yellow, iced out, hello, I'm the king of New York, Melo, Black hair by the regis and pello. Ask around, niggas know me, I'm a Europe boy, Ginobli." A Boogie wit da Hoodie declares himself the king of New York City while saying he would have shared the title with Pop Smoke if he were still alive.

Findlay opined that it is "surprising they didn't put this one on the original album, as it's easily one of the best songs we've seen from both projects". Pandora named "Hello" one of the most "liked" songs of mid-late 2020. In an interview with The Source, English actor Damson Idris explained why he loved the song: I was in [Los Angeles], and I went and in a got loud car, I never do that. I got a G-Wagon and the song was playing. Someone got in my car and played it and my shoulders just couldn't stop. Then I saw the video and I just saw the energy that he had when he performed that song. And, you know, in dedication to him, I wanted it to be on my top 50 Spotify. Bobby Shmurda shared a video of himself listening to "Hello" after serving six years in prison.

== Commercial performance ==
"Hello" initially charted and peaked at number one on the US Bubbling Under Hot 100 Singles chart, spending a milestone 24 weeks on the chart. The song later entered the US Billboard Hot 100, peaking at number 83, while reaching number 32 on the US Hot R&B/Hip-Hop Songs and number two on the Rhythmic charts. The Recording Industry Association of America (RIAA) certified the single a platinum certification, which denotes one million units based on sales and track-equivalent on-demand streams.

== Credits and personnel ==
Credits adapted from Tidal.

- Pop Smoke – vocals, songwriter
- A Boogie wit da Hoodie – vocals, songwriter
- CashMoneyAP – production, programming, songwriter
- Rico Beats – production, programming, songwriter
- Steven Victor – songwriter
- L3gion – additional production, programming, songwriter
- Jess Jackson – mastering engineer, mixing engineer
- Alex Estevez – recording engineer
- Nate Alford – recording engineer
- Rose Adams – assistant mixing engineer
- Sage Skolfield – assistant mixing engineer
- Sean Solymar – assistant mixing engineer

== Charts ==
=== Weekly charts ===
Weekly chart performance for "Hello"
Chart (2020–2021)	Peak position
Austria (Ö3 Austria Top 40)	73
Canada Hot 100 (Billboard)	31
Germany (GfK)	87
Global 200 (Billboard)	102
Greece International (IFPI)	14
Ireland (IRMA)	76
Portugal (AFP)	98
New Zealand Hot Singles (RMNZ)	37
Sweden Heatseeker (Sverigetopplistan)	4
Switzerland (Schweizer Hitparade)	53
US Billboard Hot 100	83
US Hot R&B/Hip-Hop Songs (Billboard)	32
US Rhythmic Airplay (Billboard)	2

=== Year-end charts ===
2021 year-end chart positions for "Hello"
Chart (2021)	Position
US Hot R&B/Hip-Hop Songs (Billboard)	87
US Rhythmic (Billboard)	14

== Certifications ==
Certifications and sales for "Hello"
Region	Certification	Certified units/sales
Australia (ARIA)	Gold	35,000^{‡}
Brazil (Pro-Música Brasil)	Gold	20,000^{‡}
Canada (Music Canada)	4× Platinum	320,000^{‡}
France (SNEP)	Platinum	200,000^{‡}
Germany (BVMI)	Gold	200,000^{‡}
Italy (FIMI)	Gold	35,000^{‡}
New Zealand (RMNZ)	2× Platinum	60,000^{‡}
Poland (ZPAV)	Gold	25,000^{‡}
Portugal (AFP)	Gold	5,000^{‡}
United Kingdom (BPI)	Gold	400,000^{‡}
United States (RIAA)	Platinum	1,000,000^{‡}
Streaming
Greece (IFPI Greece)	Gold	1,000,000^{†}
^{‡} Sales+streaming figures based on certification alone.^{†} Streaming-only figures based on certification alone.
