= Shotta Flow 5 =

2020 single by NLE Choppa

Single by NLE Choppa

from the album Top Shotta
- Released: June 11, 2020
- Genre: Hip hop
- Length: 2:25
- Label: NLE Choppa Entertainment; Warner
- Songwriters: Bryson Potts; Xavi Herrera; Harald Sorebo
- Producers: Xavi; Payday

NLE Choppa singles chronology
| "Tour" (2020) | "Shotta Flow 5" (2020) | "6locc 6a6y (Remix)" (2020) |

Music video
- "Shotta Flow 5" on YouTube

"Shotta Flow 5" is a song by American rapper NLE Choppa, released on June 11, 2020 with an accompanying music video. It is the fourth single from his debut studio album Top Shotta (2020), and the fifth installment in the "Shotta Flow" series. The cover, in the corner, shows a nod to the music video of the original "Shotta Flow".

== Music video ==
The music video of the song was directed by Cole Bennett. It features NLE Choppa waking up in the morning to find an afro-wearing and mustached clone of himself hiding in his closet. He chases the intruder, and tries to shoot him with a paintball gun. In the kitchen, he is shot at by a group of toy soldiers, and defeats them by throwing hot Cheetos at them. Choppa then runs to his mother's room and tells her about the chaos; however, she orders him to wash the dishes instead. As the rapper does so, he gets teased by some talking fruits. He chops them up, but is caught by his mother for making a mess. As of April 2023, it has over 95 million views.

== Charts ==
| Chart (2020) | Peak position |
|---|---|
| Canada Hot 100 (Billboard) | 51 |
| New Zealand Hot Singles (RMNZ) | 15 |
| US Billboard Hot 100 | 54 |
| US Hot R&B/Hip-Hop Songs (Billboard) | 23 |

== Certifications ==
| Region | Certification | Certified units/sales |
|---|---|---|
| Canada (Music Canada) | Gold | 40,000^{‡} |
| United States (RIAA) | Platinum | 1,000,000^{‡} |
^{‡} Sales+streaming figures based on certification alone.
