= Lil Loaded =

American rapper (2000–2021)

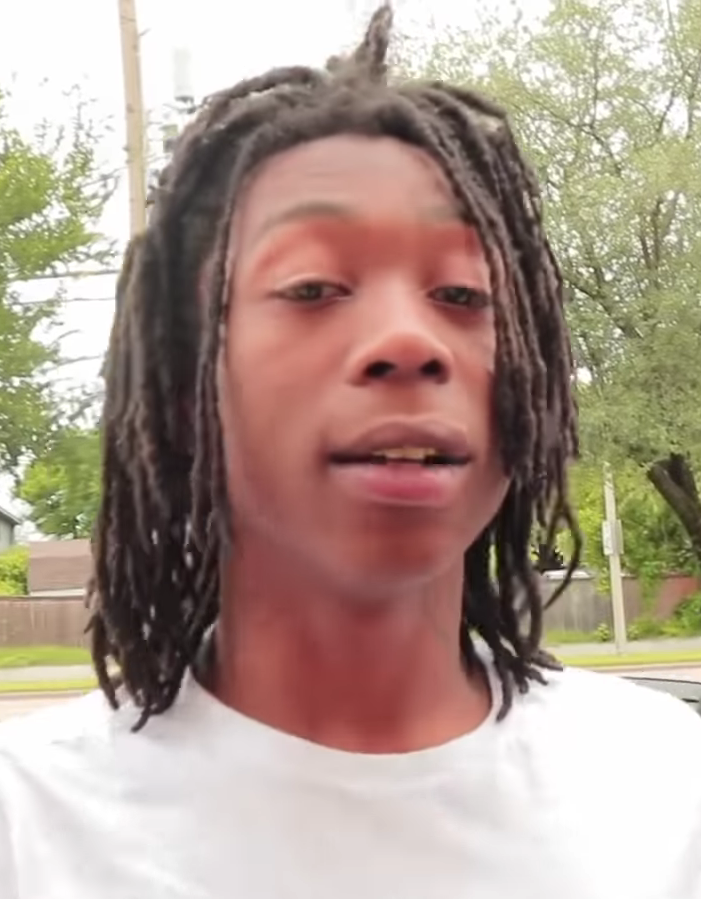
- Lil Loaded in 2021

Background information
- Also known as: YCN Gang6a6y (until 2018)
- Born: Dashawn Maurice Robertson; August 1, 2000; San Bernardino, California U.S.
- Origin: Dallas, Texas, U.S.
- Died: May 31, 2021 (aged 20) Cedar Hill, Texas, U.S.
- Cause of death: Suicide by gunshot
- Genres: Hip hop; trap; drill
- Years active: 2018–2021
- Label: Epic

Dashawn Maurice Robertson (August 1, 2000 – May 31, 2021), known professionally as Lil Loaded, was an American rapper from Dallas, Texas. He rose to fame in 2019 after his song "6locc 6a6y" went viral. He died in 2021 by suicide.

== Early life ==
Dashawn Robertson was born in San Bernardino, California, and raised in Dallas, Texas. When asked what it was like growing up in Dallas, he said: "It's like everywhere in the city, you see different stuff, I guess you kind of grow up a little bit faster I would say in Dallas". He grew up with five siblings, an older brother, two older sisters, a younger sister, and a younger brother and was raised by a single mom while his dad was in prison. In 2015, when Robertson was 15, his older brother, who was 23 at the time, was murdered.

== Career ==
Robertson started rapping in late 2018 and released three singles, "Happy 6irthday" featuring YCN Otto, "Wit Me" featuring Jandro and "No Rea$on" on MyMixtapez and YouTube account under rap name YCN Gang6a6y. Then he renamed himself Lil Loaded in early 2019. On June 7, 2019, he released "B.O.S.", a take on YNW Melly's song "Butter Pecan". He rose to prominence in 2019 when YouTuber Tommy Craze included his song "6locc 6a6y" in a reaction video in which he watched YouTube music videos that had 0 views. "6locc 6a6y" was certified gold in May 2021, by which point it had received over 28 million views on YouTube. Robertson later released "Gang Unit", which had garnered more than 59 million YouTube views by May 2022. He also released a single with Chicago drill rapper King Von, on March 20, 2020, named "Avatar".

Robertson later signed with Epic Records. He released his 6locc 6a6y mixtape in 2019, and returned in 2020 with A Demon in 6lue and Criptape.

On May 31, 2022, Robertson's team posthumously released "Cell Tales" on the first anniversary of his death.

== Legal issues ==
On October 25, 2020, Robertson allegedly shot and killed his best friend, 18-year-old Khalil Walker, while recording a music video. Robertson turned himself in to police on November 9, 2020, after a warrant was issued for his arrest. He was indicted on a lesser charge of manslaughter in connection with the incident in February 2021. Robertson maintained that the incident was an accident.

== Death ==
Robertson committed suicide via gunshot wound to the head and was found dead in his home in Cedar Hill, Texas, on May 31, 2021, at the age of 20. He was found dead by his mother who then called the police. When police arrived, they saw his mother outside of the home crying and she told them Robertson was inside the house with a gunshot wound. She claimed that he had been upset over a breakup with his girlfriend the night before his death.

== Discography ==
=== Studio albums ===
Title	Album details	Peak chart positions
Title	Album details	US Heat.
A Demon in 6lue	Released: October 9, 2020; Label: Epic; Format: Digital download, streaming	19

=== Mixtapes ===
Title	Mixtape details
6locc 6a6y	Released: December 6, 2019; Label: Epic; Format: Digital download, streaming
Criptape	Released: December 11, 2020; Label: Epic; Format: Digital download, streaming

=== Singles ===
Title	Year	Certifications	Album(s)
"6locc 6a6y" (solo or remix featuring NLE Choppa)	2019	RIAA: Gold	6locc 6a6y and A Demon in 6lue
"Gang Unit" (solo or remix featuring YG)	2019		6locc 6a6y and A Demon in 6lue
"While I'm Here" (featuring Polo G)	2020		A Demon In 6lue
"Avatar" (featuring King Von)	2020		A Demon In 6lue
"Link Up" (featuring Pooh Shiesty)	2020		Criptape
"Hard Times" (featuring Hotboii)	2021		Criptape
"Cell Tales"	2022		Non-album single
