= From Dark to Light =

2020 mixtape by NLE Choppa

Mixtape by NLE Choppa
- Released: November 1, 2020
- Recorded: 2019–2020
- Length: 40:29
- Label: Warner
- Producer: Carron Washington; Chopsquad DJ; D.A Got That Dope; DJ KiDD; DMAC; Evergrn; Fritz!; Geovocals; Ink; JB; Kannon Beats; Karltin Bankz; Killian Beatz; Lamar Keys; Londn Blue; Mike Mvjor; Moneyevery; Rara; Raydar LLC; SephGotTheWaves; TNTXD; Thaj Money; Xansei for Crystal Chain; Young TN; Yung Lan

NLE Choppa chronology
Top Shotta (2020)	From Dark to Light (2020)	Me vs. Me (2022)

Singles from From Dark to Light
- 1. "Bryson" Released: November 1, 2020

From Dark to Light is the fourth mixtape by American rapper NLE Choppa. It was released through NLE Choppa Entertainment under license to Warner Records on November 1, 2020, the rapper's 18th birthday. The mixtape was announced in October in an interview with Raptv. It features guest appearances from Big Sean and Ink. The song "Bryson", which is named after his first name, was released as the mixtape's lead single, along with the music video. The mixtape's lyrical content is focused on meditation, affirmations, and positivity, a notable change from NLE Choppa's previous work.

The mixtape debuted and peaked at 115 on the Billboard 200.

== Critical reception ==
Professional ratings
Review scores
Source	Rating
AllMusic	3.5/5 stars

Fred Thomas of AllMusic said, "Guns, violence, and street life were constant themes in Choppa's music, but mixtape From Dark to Light takes an unexpected turn towards positivity and enlightenment."

== Track listing ==
Credits adapted from Tidal.

No.	Title	Writer(s)	Producer(s)	Length
1.	"Intro"	Bryson Potts; Atia "Ink" Boggs; Carron Washington	Ink; Washington	1:32
2.	"Bryson"	Potts; Justin Bradbury; Terrence Duncan; Horton	Lamar Keys; JB; TntXD	3:41
3.	"Picture Me Grapin'"	Potts; Tupac Shakur; Claydes Smith; Dennis Thomas; George Brown; Jonathan Jackson; Otha Nash; Richard Westfield; Ronald Bell; Robert Bell; Robert Mickens; Tyruss Himes; Vince Edwards; Yuta Hanada	Xansei for Crystal Chain; Raydar LLC	3:42
4.	"Moonlight" (featuring Big Sean)	Potts; Sean Anderson; Rashaad Green; Tahj Vaughn; Thanush Perinpanesan; Horton	Rara; Tahj Money; TntXD; Young Tn	3:30
5.	"Taliban"	Potts; Mikul Thomas; Ryan O'Neill; Horton	Moneyevery; Mike Mvjor; TntXD	3:04
6.	"Twin Flame"	Potts; Adam Fritzler; Amman Nurani; David McDowell; Horton	Dmac; Evrgrn; TntXD; Fritz	3:17
7.	"Body Catchers"	Potts; Darrell Jackson	Chopsquad DJ	2:41
8.	"Hear Me" (featuring Ink)	Potts; Boggs; Georgia Boyden; Joseph Boyden; Horton	GeoVocals; SephGotTheWaves; TntXD	2:59
9.	"Man Down"	Potts; D.A. Doman	D.A Got That Dope	3:09
10.	"100 Grapes"	Potts; McDowell; Lisa Gerrard; Pieter Bourke; Vaughn; Horton	Dmac; Tahj Money; TntXD	2:53
11.	"Love Tonight"	Potts; Kordarius Johnson; Myles Gatewood	DJ Kidd; Kannon Beats	3:40
12.	"Done"	Potts; Dennis Killian; Milan Modi; Horton	TntXD; Yung Lan	2:57
13.	"Paradise"	Potts; McDowell; Lukas Payne; Sterling Reynolds; Horton	Dmac; Karltin Bankz; Londn Blue; TntXD	3:24
Total length:				40:29

== Charts ==
Chart (2020)	Peak position
US Billboard 200	115
