= CashMoneyAP =

French record producer (born 1995)

- CashMoneyAP in 2018

Background information
- Born: Alex Christian Jean Petit, Sr. May 19, 1995 (age 31); Guadeloupe, France
- Genres: Hip hop; trap
- Occupations: Record producer; songwriter; record executive
- Years active: 2010–present
- Labels: Victor Victor; UMPG; Cash Gang; Atlantic

Alex Christian Jean Petit (born May 19, 1995), known professionally as CashMoneyAP, is a French record producer and record executive. He is best known for having produced the Billboard Hot 100-top ten single "For the Night" (2020) by Pop Smoke, as well as the top 40 singles "Gangstas" (2020) also by Pop Smoke, and "Slut Me Out" (2022) by NLE Choppa. He gained initial recognition for posting "type beats" on YouTube and the music licensing platform BeatStars.

== Early life ==
Alex Christian Jean Petit, Sr. was born in Guadeloupe, a French-Caribbean island, on May 19, 1995. He started making "type beats", which is production in the style of certain popular artists, and posted them on YouTube, where he eventually gained a following. His stage name, "CashMoneyAP", originates from the name of the label Cash Money Records and his initials (Alex Petit).

== Career ==
Petit has produced beats for artists such as Roddy Ricch, Lil Skies, Gucci Mane, NLE Choppa, and more. Between 2013 and 2014, he started gaining attention in Chicago when he started producing beats for prominent drill rappers such as Fredo Santana, Lil Jay and Famous Dex. He started to gain mainstream attraction after he produced Lil Skies' song "Nowadays", which peaked at number 55 on the Billboard Hot 100.

== Other ventures ==
Petit founded the record label and production collective Cash Gang in early 2020. Its roster includes record producers Daniel Moras, Layz, Luci G, Palaze, Relly Made, Santo, Tig, Weird Mahdi, SZR, YoungKio and YoungNef. It is a subsidiary of the record label Petit is signed to, Victor Victor Worldwide. Petit is also signed as a producer to Universal Music Publishing Group and as a recording artist to Atlantic Records.

== Production discography ==
=== Charted songs ===
Title	Year	Peak chart positions						Album
Title	Year	US	US R&B/HH	CAN	IRE	NZ Hot	UK	Album
"Nowadays" (Lil Skies featuring Landon Cube)	2017	55	22	63	—	—	—	Life of a Dark Rose
"Lust" (Lil Skies)	2017	87	47	—	—	—	—	Life of a Dark Rose
"Pineapple" (Ty Dolla Sign featuring Gucci Mane and Quavo)	2018	— (Note: "Pineapple" did not chart on the Hot 100, but did peak at number 18 on the Bubbling Under Hot 100 chart.)	—	91	—	—	—	Beach House 3
"Self Control" (YoungBoy Never Broke Again)	2019	50	24	—	—	—	—	AI YoungBoy 2
"Pop Star" (DaBaby featuring Kevin Gates)	2019	49	25	97	—	—	—	Kirk
"Forever" (NLE Choppa)	2019	— (Note: "Forever" did not enter the Billboard Hot 100, but peaked at number 18 on the Bubbling Under Hot 100 chart.)	—	—	—	—	—	TBA
"Famous Hoes" (NLE Choppa)	2019	83	36	95	—	—	—	Non-album singles
"Dirty Iyanna" (YoungBoy Never Broke Again)	2019	67	28	—	—	—	—	Non-album singles
"Walk Em Down" (NLE Choppa featuring Roddy Ricch)	2020	38	16	49	65	9	85	Top Shotta
"Vacation" (Tyga)	2020	— (Note: "Vacation" did not chart on the Hot 100, but did peak at number 23 on the Bubbling Under Hot 100 chart.)	—	—	—	10	—	TBA
"For the Night" (Pop Smoke featuring Lil Baby and DaBaby)	2020	6	5	7	24	2	14	Shoot for the Stars, Aim for the Moon
"Gangstas" (Pop Smoke)	2020	37	18	16	—	—	—	Shoot for the Stars, Aim for the Moon
"Hello" (Pop Smoke featuring A Boogie wit da Hoodie)	2020	84	32	31	77	37	—	Shoot for the Stars, Aim for the Moon
"Riot" (Lil Skies)	2020	—	—	—	—	37	—	Unbothered
"None of Your Love" (Lil Tjay)	2020	—	—	—	—	29	—	Destined 2 Win
"Mr. Jones" (Pop Smoke featuring Future)	2021	71	26	49	—	—	—	Faith
"Jumpin" (NLE Choppa featuring Polo G)	2021	89	40	74	—	25	—	Me vs. Me
"Shotta Flow 6" (NLE Choppa)	2022	86	30	—	—	—	—	Me vs. Me
"Slut Me Out" (NLE Choppa)	2022	28	9	24	70	15	68	Cottonwood 2
"Her" (Megan Thee Stallion)	2022	62	19	—	—	6	—	Traumazine
