= Camelot (song) =

2019 single by NLE Choppa

Single by NLE Choppa

from the album Top Shotta
- Released: September 13, 2019
- Genre: Trap
- Length: 2:28
- Label: Warner
- Songwriters: Bryson Potts; Darzell Triplett
- Producer: FreshDuzIt

NLE Choppa singles chronology
"Uppin The Score" (2019)	"Camelot" (2019)	"ChopBloc 2" (2019)

Music video
- "Camelot" on YouTube

"Camelot" is a song by American rapper NLE Choppa. It was released on September 13, 2019, through Warner Records as the second single from his debut studio album, Top Shotta. It was produced by FreshDuzIt. The song is named after a street in NLE Choppa's hometown of Memphis, Tennessee, while the lyrics itself detail street life, threats to rivals, and his dangerous lifestyle.

== Music video ==
The music video was released on September 12, 2019, and was directed by Cole Bennett. The music video shows NLE Choppa meeting up with his crew to go fight opposing gang members, before putting on a disguise to avoid police capture.

== Remix ==
The remix of the song, featuring BlocBoy JB, Yo Gotti, and Moneybagg Yo, was released on December 6, 2019.

== Charts ==
=== Weekly charts ===
Chart (2019)	Peak position
Canada (Canadian Hot 100)	35
Ireland (IRMA)	78
Lithuania (AGATA)	77
New Zealand Hot Singles (RMNZ)	10
US Billboard Hot 100	37
US Hot R&B/Hip-Hop Songs (Billboard)	17
US Rolling Stone Top 100	23

=== Year-end charts ===
Chart (2019)	Position
US Hot R&B/Hip-Hop Songs (Billboard)	93
Chart (2020)	Position
US Hot R&B/Hip-Hop Songs (Billboard)	76

== Certifications ==
Region	Certification	Certified units/sales
Canada (Music Canada)	4× Platinum	320,000^{‡}
Denmark (IFPI Danmark)	Gold	45,000^{‡}
New Zealand (RMNZ)	Platinum	30,000^{‡}
Poland (ZPAV)	Gold	25,000^{‡}
Portugal (AFP)	Gold	5,000^{‡}
United Kingdom (BPI)	Silver	200,000^{‡}
United States (RIAA)	5× Platinum	5,000,000^{‡}
^{‡} Sales+streaming figures based on certification alone.
