= Shotta Flow 7 =

2023 single by NLE Choppa

Single by NLE Choppa
- Released: December 7, 2023
- Genre: Hip hop
- Length: 2:45
- Label: No Love; Warner
- Songwriters: Bryson Potts; Xavier Barrios; Dameon Hughes; Brytavious Chambers; Donald Bailey Jr.
- Producers: Project X; Superstar O; Tay Keith; Midas800

NLE Choppa singles chronology
"Badman" (2023)	"Shotta Flow 7" (2023)	"Blick (Remix)" (2024)

Music video
- "Shotta Flow 7" on YouTube

Remix cover
- Cover art of the official remix

Remix music video
- "Shotta Flow 7 (Remix)" on YouTube

"Shotta Flow 7" is a single by American rapper NLE Choppa, released on December 7, 2023 and produced by Project X, Superstar O, Tay Keith and Midas800. It is the seventh installment in his "Shotta Flow" song series. An official remix of the song featuring American rapper Lil Mabu was released on February 22, 2024.

== Composition ==
The production contains piano keys, drums, and hi-hats, over which NLE Choppa raps about being respected in his hometown of Memphis. He jokes about Chrisean Rock's missing tooth in the first line of the first verse, makes a reference to Diddy, and mentions wanting to have sex with Kim Kardashian with her ex-husband Kanye West watching.

== Critical reception ==
Armon Sadler of Vibe gave a positive review, writing NLE Choppa "flows like his name conveys—consistently, sometimes violently, and punctually. It's a good reminder that he can do this in addition to his sample-heavy, melodic records of the last few years." Zachary Horvath of HotNewHipHop praised the song for its "funny" lines, additionally commenting "This is pure poetry and we are going to miss the series deeply after this one."

== Remix ==
The official remix of the song was released on February 22, 2024. It features Lil Mabu, who details a sexual act and also says he is "good at the cookout, every hood, every trap house".

A music video was released alongside the remix. It sees NLE Choppa at a house party, where Lil Mabu also brings pizza, and features a video vixen resembling Chrisean Rock, as a diss toward her ex-boyfriend and rapper Blueface.

== Charts ==
Chart performance for "Shotta Flow 7"
Chart (2023)	Peak position
New Zealand Hot Singles (RMNZ)	23
US Bubbling Under Hot 100 (Billboard)	24
