= Me vs. Me (NLE Choppa mixtape) =

Mixtape by NLE Choppa
- Released: January 28, 2022
- Recorded: 2020–2021
- Genre: Gangsta rap; trap
- Length: 53:13
- Label: Warner; NLE Choppa Entertainment
- Producer: CashMoneyAP; ChaseTheMoney; Cxdy; Damn E; Soundmain; DracoKid; Daniel Moras; DJ Khaled's Son; Ellis Lost; Iceberg; Loshendrix; Mason Wu; Mike Mvjor; Nick Mira; Quay Global; Southside; Taz Taylor; YoungKio; Yume

NLE Choppa chronology
| From Dark to Light (2020) | Me vs. Me (2022) | Cottonwood 2 (2023) |

Singles from Me vs. Me
- 1. "Final Warning" Released: April 30, 2021; 2. "Mmm Hmm" Released: August 13, 2021; 3. "Jumpin" Released: November 5, 2021; 4. "I.Y.B." Released: November 19, 2021; 5. "Drop Shit" Released: December 17, 2021; 6. "Too Hot" Released: January 14, 2022; 7. "Shotta Flow 6" Released: January 28, 2022

Professional ratings
Review scores
| Source | Rating |
|---|---|
| AllMusic | 4/5 stars |
| Clash | 5/10 |
| HipHopDX | 3.2/5 |

Me vs. Me is the fifth mixtape by American rapper NLE Choppa. It was released through Warner Records on January 28, 2022. The mixtape features guest appearances from Young Thug, Polo G, G Herbo, and Moneybagg Yo.

== Background and promotion ==
The mixtape was originally supposed to be released on December 17, 2021. NLE Choppa later pushed it back by four weeks to January 14, 2022, and then again by another week, January 21, 2022. On the originally planned release date, NLE Choppa was interviewed by HotNewHipHop and revealed that Young Thug and Moneybagg Yo will both appear on the project. He commentated his opinion on it:

Me vs. Me is, pretty much, a project concept I've been wanting to get out for a long time. I chose a few old songs and I chose a lot more newer songs so that people can see the growth that I've shown musically. At the same time, I'm still speaking on the same topics of what my core fans like to hear from me.

On January 20 the mixtape release was postponed by another week. The artist said this was out of respect for the Long Live Young Dolph compilation which was released that week in honor of Young Dolph.

== Singles ==
The mixtape’s lead single, "Final Warning", was released on April 30, 2021. The second single, "Mmm Hmm", was released on August 13, 2021. The third single, "Jumpin", which features American rapper Polo G, was released on November 5, 2021. The fourth single, "I.Y.B.", was released on November 19, 2021. The fifth single, "Drop Shit", was released on December 17, 2021. The sixth and final single, "Too Hot", which features American rapper Moneybagg Yo, was released on January 14, 2022. On January 28, 2022, the same day the mixtape released, the seventh single, "Shotta Flow 6", released with the music video for it.

== Track listing ==
Me vs. Me track listing
| No. | Title | Writer(s) | Producer(s) | Length |
|---|---|---|---|---|
| 1. | "Shotta Flow 6" | Bryson Potts; Alex Petit; Ryan Nerby | CashMoneyAP; King Fisher | 3:12 |
| 2. | "Push It" (featuring Young Thug) | Potts; Jeffery Williams; Lloyd Sekyere; Hidde Ament; Almer Ament | Yung Milly; Ament | 3:30 |
| 3. | "Jumpin" (featuring Polo G) | Potts; Taurus Bartlett; Petit; Kiowa Roukema; Carlos Muñoz; Daniel Moras Raab; Dounia Aznou; Carter Lang; Jordan Waré; Kaniel Castaneda; Damico Hammel; Turrell Sims; Clifford Owuor | CashMoneyAP; YoungKio; Lang; Loshendrix; Moras; Yume | 3:01 |
| 4. | "Trap Phone" | Potts; Joshua Luellen; Lewis Ellis | Southside; Ellis Lost | 3:20 |
| 5. | "Final Warning" | Potts; Elisner Joseph | Damn E | 2:36 |
| 6. | "I.Y.B." | Potts; Christopher Rosser | Quay Global | 1:32 |
| 7. | "Stompin" | Potts; Aidan Barrett; Raphael Udo III | DracoKid; Sacaii | 3:15 |
| 8. | "Change My Ways" | Potts; Samuel Jimenez; Joshua Parker; Omar Gomez | Smash David; OG Parker; Beat Menace | 3:17 |
| 9. | "Ima Dogg" | Potts; Petit | CashMoneyAP | 4:17 |
| 10. | "Mmm Hmm" | Potts; Dylan Berg; Mikul Thomas; Carson Stewart | Iceberg; Mike Mvjor; DJ Khaled's Son | 3:04 |
| 11. | "Still Hood" | Potts; Petit; Moras Raab | CashMoneyAP; Moras | 4:35 |
| 12. | "Drop Shit" | Potts; Danny Snodgrass, Jr.; Nicholas Mira; Cody Rounds; Mason Wu | Taz Taylor; Nick Mira; Cxdy; Wu | 3:19 |
| 13. | "Chicago to Memphis" (featuring G Herbo) | Potts; Herbert Wright III; Tiquon Pryor; Elijah Gull; Gorelov Aleksandrovich | TP808; Chosen 1; Doc Playboi | 3:29 |
| 14. | "Too Hot" (featuring Moneybagg Yo) | Potts; Demario White, Jr.; Chase Rose; Vincent Desrosiers | ChaseTheMoney; Desro | 3:36 |
| 15. | "Lick Me Baby" | Potts; Yonatan Goldstein | Johnny Goldstein | 2:53 |
| 16. | "Youngest to Do It" | Potts; Udo III; Aleksandr Feoktistov | Soundmain; DracoKid | 4:17 |
| Total length: | | | | 53:13 |

== Charts ==
Chart performance for Me vs. Me
| Chart (2022) | Peak position |
|---|---|
| Canadian Albums (Billboard) | 32 |
| US Billboard 200 | 14 |
| US Top R&B/Hip-Hop Albums (Billboard) | 8 |
