= Walk Em Down =

2020 song by NLE Choppa featuring Roddy Ricch

Single by NLE Choppa featuring Roddy Ricch

from the album Top Shotta
- Released: March 19, 2020
- Recorded: 2019
- Genre: Hip hop; trap
- Length: 2:52
- Label: Warner
- Songwriters: Bryson Potts; Rodrick Moore, Jr.; Alex Petit; Carlos Muñoz
- Producers: CashMoneyAP; Loshendrix

NLE Choppa singles chronology
| "Grim Reapa Flow" (2020) | "Walk Em Down" (2020) | "Tour" (2020) |

Roddy Ricch singles chronology
| "The Box" (2020) | "Walk Em Down" (2020) | "Numbers" (2020) |

Music video
- "Walk Em Down" on YouTube

"Walk Em Down" is a song by American rapper NLE Choppa featuring fellow American rapper Roddy Ricch, released on March 19, 2020 by Warner Records as the third single from the former's debut studio album Top Shotta.

== Background ==
NLE Choppa talked about the track in an interview with Complex. He said that he linked up with Roddy Ricch through Instagram’s DMs.

== Composition and lyrics ==
On the song, Choppa, who usually has a "wild and rambunctious" delivery, employs his verses with more "reserve". Complex magazine's Jessica McKinney noted the "lyrical message is similar to Choppa's past songs, but the delivery is more melodic and smooth". McKinney attributed this to featured artist Roddy Ricch, who "may have served as some inspiration behind NLE's switch-up".

== Critical reception ==
Billboard named the song one of the most essential releases of the week, calling it a "menacing anthem". The song has inspired the #WalkEmDownChallenge on video-sharing app TikTok.

== Music video ==
The music video was released on March 19, 2020, along with the release of the single.

== Charts ==
=== Weekly charts ===
Weekly chart performance for "Walk Em Down"
| Chart (2020) | Peak position |
|---|---|
| Canada Hot 100 (Billboard) | 49 |
| Ireland (IRMA) | 65 |
| Lithuania (AGATA) | 86 |
| New Zealand Hot Singles (RMNZ) | 9 |
| Portugal (AFP) | 92 |
| Sweden Heatseeker (Sverigetopplistan) | 20 |
| UK Singles (Official Charts Company) | 85 |
| US Billboard Hot 100 | 38 |
| US Hot R&B/Hip-Hop Songs (Billboard) | 16 |
| US Rhythmic Airplay (Billboard) | 20 |
| US Rolling Stone Top 100 | 25 |

=== Year-end charts ===
2020 year-end chart performance for "Walk Em Down"
| Chart (2020) | Position |
|---|---|
| US Billboard Hot 100 | 100 |
| US Hot R&B/Hip-Hop Songs (Billboard) | 49 |

== Certifications ==
Certifications and sales for "Walk Em Down"
| Region | Certification | Certified units/sales |
|---|---|---|
| Canada (Music Canada) | 4× Platinum | 320,000^{‡} |
| Denmark (IFPI Danmark) | Gold | 45,000^{‡} |
| New Zealand (RMNZ) | Platinum | 30,000^{‡} |
| Poland (ZPAV) | Gold | 25,000^{‡} |
| Portugal (AFP) | Gold | 5,000^{‡} |
| United Kingdom (BPI) | Silver | 200,000^{‡} |
| United States (RIAA) | 5× Platinum | 5,000,000^{‡} |
^{‡} Sales+streaming figures based on certification alone.
