= Final Warning (NLE Choppa song) =

Single by NLE Choppa

Single by NLE Choppa

from the album Me vs. Me
- Released: April 30, 2021
- Genre: Hip hop
- Length: 2:36
- Label: Warner
- Songwriters: Bryson Potts; Elisner Joseph
- Producer: Damn E

NLE Choppa singles chronology
"Beat Box 4" (2021)	"Final Warning" (2021)	"Mmm Hmm" (2021)

Music video
- "Final Warning" on YouTube

"Final Warning" is a song by American rapper NLE Choppa. It was released on April 30, 2021, with an accompanying music video and produced by Damn E. It is also the lead single from his third mixtape, Me vs. Me (2022).

== Composition ==
The song was written by NLE Choppa and Elisner Joseph. In the song, NLE Choppa warns his enemies of the "damage" he can cause. He raps, "Never send a threat on the internet just to prove a point / That dissin', don't get into that, we leavin' that to the informants / Don't inform me about who informing, that's yo' final warning / 7.62s sting like a Bumblebee, he start transforming".

== Music video ==
The music video, directed by Krispy Kam and NLE Choppa himself, shows Choppa dancing with his friends and showing stacks of money. They are seen at a gas station and in a basement as well they are also seen in various different cars.

== Charts ==
Chart (2021)	Peak position
Canada Hot 100 (Billboard)	95
US Billboard Hot 100	90
US Hot R&B/Hip-Hop Songs (Billboard)	40

== Certifications ==
Region	Certification	Certified units/sales
Canada (Music Canada)	Gold	40,000^{‡}
United States (RIAA)	Platinum	1,000,000^{‡}
^{‡} Sales+streaming figures based on certification alone.
