= Narrow Road =

Single by NLE Choppa featuring Lil Baby

Single by NLE Choppa featuring Lil Baby

from the album Top Shotta
- Released: July 30, 2020
- Length: 4:25
- Label: NLE Choppa Entertainment; Warner
- Songwriters: Bryson Potts; Dominique Jones; Christopher Rosser
- Producer: Quay Global

NLE Choppa singles chronology
"Ruff Rydas" (2020)	"Narrow Road" (2020)	"Memphis, Pt. 2" (2020)

Lil Baby singles chronology
"Always n Forever" (2020)	"Narrow Road" (2020)	"She Knows" (2020)

Music video
- "Narrow Road" on YouTube

"Narrow Road" is a song by American rapper NLE Choppa, released as the fifth single from his debut studio album Top Shotta (2020). The song features American rapper Lil Baby and was produced by Quay Global.

== Composition ==
In the song, both rappers sing about the struggles of their past and overcoming them. NLE Choppa mentions his use of drugs and its impact on his health in the chorus: "I just copped the Range Rover with some forgis / Sipping codeine, feeling like a dope fiend / He say I'm not a killer that nigga don't know me / My OG told me put in work when I was 14." In his verse, Choppa melodically raps about the what has shaped his mentality ("They tell me think smart, I know right from wrong / They say I'm going to get life with this dirty chrome).

== Music video ==
The music video was released on October 23, 2020. It opens with NLE Choppa in the backseat of a Land Rover, telling a story of how an "OG" saved his life. He then raps, as he rides to an airport where Lil Baby is.

== Charts ==
Chart (2020)	Peak position
New Zealand Hot Singles (RMNZ)	19
US Bubbling Under Hot 100 (Billboard)	4
US Hot R&B/Hip-Hop Songs (Billboard)	46

== Certifications ==
Region	Certification	Certified units/sales
Canada (Music Canada)	Gold	40,000^{‡}
United States (RIAA)	Platinum	1,000,000^{‡}
^{‡} Sales+streaming figures based on certification alone.
