= Top Shotta =

Studio album by NLE Choppa
- Released: August 7, 2020
- Recorded: 2019–2020
- Genres: Hip hop; trap; gangsta rap
- Length: 61:25
- Label: Warner
- Producers: Budda Beats; CashMoneyAP; Chapo; DMAC; Evince; Evrgrn; FreshDuzIt; Glazer; GStylesOnTheTrack; Hozay Beats; Javar Rockamore; Kannon; Karltin Bankz; Keyz; Kyle Junior; Londn Blue; Loshendrix; MP808; Noah; Palaze; Papamitrou; Payday; Soul Soundz; Spencer Stewart; Stebbz; Stonii; TNTXD; Tre Pounds; Xavi; Yung Talent

NLE Choppa chronology
Cottonwood (2019)	Top Shotta (2020)	From Dark to Light (2020)

Singles from Top Shotta
- 1. "Shotta Flow 3" Released: July 19, 2019; 2. "Camelot" Released: September 13, 2019; 3. "Walk Em Down" Released: March 19, 2020; 4. "Shotta Flow 5" Released: June 11, 2020; 5. "Narrow Road" Released: July 30, 2020; 6. "Make Em Say" Released: August 7, 2020

Top Shotta is the debut studio album by American rapper NLE Choppa. It was released on August 7, 2020, by Warner Records. It was initially set for release in early 2020, but was delayed. Production on the album was handled by several record producers, including CashMoneyAP, Javar Rockamore, and TNTXD, among others. It features guest appearances from Latto, Roddy Ricch, Chief Keef, and Lil Baby. The album debuted at number ten on the Billboard 200.

The album was promoted by six singles: "Shotta Flow 3", "Camelot", "Walk Em Down", "Shotta Flow 5", "Narrow Road", and "Make Em Say".

== Critical reception ==
Professional ratings
Review scores
Source	Rating
AllMusic	4/5 stars
NME	3/5 stars
Paste	7/10

Top Shotta was met with mostly favorable reviews from music critics. NME awarded the album three out of five stars, criticizing the first half of the album for its lack of cohesiveness, but praising the album's second half for its more reflective subject matter, saying "He's only 18, and yet the rap protege here proves himself with a collection that balances his braggadocio and vulnerability to thrilling effect." Paste magazine gave the album a score of 7/10, saying "The young rapper's major-label debut, Top Shotta, is at its best when he's open, honest and emotional."

== Track listing ==
No.	Title	Writer(s)	Producer(s)	Length
1.	"Daydream"	Bryson Potts; Noah Pettigrew; Gunnlaugur Orri Sumarlidason; Stefan Vilhelmsson	Glazer; Noah; Stebbz; RealRed (add.)	2:22
2.	"Double Bacc"	Potts; Alex Petit; Nikolas Papamitrou; Camren Martin	CashMoneyAP; Nick Papz; Yung Talent; RealRed (add.)	3:14
3.	"Make Em Say" (featuring Mulatto)	Potts; Alyssa Stephens; Zachary Thomas; Terrell McNeal; Norva Denton; Carl Dorsey; Andrell Rogers	Budda Beats; MP808	3:22
4.	"Camelot"	Potts; Darzell Triplett	FreshDuzIt	2:28
5.	"Walk Em Down" (featuring Roddy Ricch)	Potts; Rodrick Moore, Jr.; Petit; Carlos Muñoz	CashMoneyAP; Loshendrix	2:53
6.	"Murda Talk"	Potts; Robert Reese; Theodore Thomas; Javar Rockamore; Caleb McLean; Ron Montgomery	Keyz; Stonii; Javar Rockamore; Soul Soundz; RealRed (add.)	2:24
7.	"Who TF Up in My Trap"	Potts; Reese; Thomas; Jeffrey Page; Joe Cooley; Rodney Oliver; Jordan Houston; Patrick Houston; Paul Beauregard	Keyz; Stonii; Javar Rockamore	2:24
8.	"Shotta Flow 3"	Potts; Jose Reynoso-Contreras	Hozay Beats	3:01
9.	"Top Shotta Flow"	Potts; Jeff Lacroix; Rockamore; McLean; Montgomery	Tre Pounds; Javar Rockamore; Soul Soundz; RealRed (add.)	2:46
10.	"Shotta Flow 4" (featuring Chief Keef)	Potts; Keith Cozart; Petit	CashMoneyAP; RealRed (add.)	3:37
11.	"Shotta Flow 5"	Potts; Harald Sorebo; Courageous Herrera	Payday; Xavi; RealRed (add.)	2:25
12.	"Neighborhood Watch"	Potts; Kodarius Johnson	Kannon	3:22
13.	"Can't Take It"	Potts; Thomas Horton; Amman Nurani	TNTXD; Evrgrn	3:05
14.	"Gamble with My Heart"	Potts; Horton; David McDowell; Lukas Payne; Jerome Grant; Sterling Reynolds; Jhamiel	TNTXD; Dmac; Karltin Bankz; Londn Blue	3:02
15.	"Molly"	Potts; Petit; Benjamin Calame	CashMoneyAP; Chapo	3:23
16.	"Paranoid"	Potts; Christoffer Marcussen; Kyle Junior	Palaze; Kyle Junior	2:59
17.	"Narrow Road" (featuring Lil Baby)	Potts; Dominique Jones; Christopher Rosser	Quay Global	4:00
18.	"Watch Out for the Narcs"	Potts; Petit; Spencer Stewart; Jesse Evans	CashMoneyAP; Spencer Stewart; Evince; RealRed (add.)	3:36
19.	"Made It Happen"	Potts; Horton; McDowell; Payne	TNTXD; Dmac; Karltin Bankz; Londn Blue	2:51
20.	"Depression"	Potts; Golden Styles; Leonsio Muca; Lucas Cardoso Suckow; Monique Diamond	GStylesOnTheTrack; Monique Winning (add.)	4:03
Total length:				1:01:25

== Charts ==
=== Weekly charts ===
Chart (2020)	Peak position
Canadian Albums (Billboard)	14
Norwegian Albums (VG-lista)	31
US Billboard 200	10
US Top R&B/Hip-Hop Albums (Billboard)	6
US Top Rap Albums (Billboard)	7

=== Year-end charts ===
Chart (2020)	Position
US Top R&B/Hip-Hop Albums (Billboard)	77

== Certifications ==
Region	Certification	Certified units/sales
Canada (Music Canada)	Platinum	80,000^{‡}
United States (RIAA)	Platinum	1,000,000^{‡}
^{‡} Sales+streaming figures based on certification alone.
