= Shotta Flow =

Single by NLE Choppa

from the EP Cottonwood
- Released: January 11, 2019
- Recorded: 2018
- Genre: Trap
- Songwriters: Bryson Potts; Donald Bailey, Jr.
- Producer: Midas800

NLE Choppa singles chronology
| "Drip Creator" (2018) | "Shotta Flow" (2019) | "Shotta on Dripp" (2019) |

Music video
- "Shotta Flow" on YouTube

"Shotta Flow" is the breakout single by American rapper NLE Choppa, released on January 11, 2019. A remix featuring American rapper Blueface was released on June 20, 2019 along with a music video directed by Cole Bennett. Produced by Midas800, The song reached number 36 on the US Billboard Hot 100 and was certified double platinum by the Recording Industry Association of America (RIAA). Seven additional sequels to the song have since been released.

== Critical reception ==
Pitchfork named it their New Rap Song of the Day, complimenting it as a "true-to-Memphis shoot-dancing bounce" and NLE Choppa's "animated vocals" and "energetic delivery". Complex called it a "bouncy, menacing track". Billboard called "Shotta Flow" a "boisterous hip-hop track" with the rapper having a "melodic, heavy-hitting delivery". HotNewHipHop noted that the song "bec[ame ...] essentially inescapable on hip-hop playlists" and that the remix adds Blueface's "off-kilter flow" to the "piano-based production".

== Music video ==
An accompanying video at a length of three minutes was first released on YouTube in early January 2019, showcasing NLE Choppa and his friends "dancing, joking around and toting prop guns". The video quickly gained attention from hip hop vloggers and amassed 915,000 views within the first week of its release, according to YouTube. As of June 2023, the video has over 209 million views.

=== Reception ===
According to Billboard magazine, within only a month after the "Shotta Flow" video went viral, NLE Choppa had sparked a bidding war among record companies like Republic, Interscope, and Caroline, with bids reportedly reaching as high as $3 million. However, he turned down those offers to enter a distribution partnership with independent distribution company UnitedMasters.

== Remix ==
A remix featuring American rapper Blueface was released on June 20, 2019, accompanied by a music video directed by Cole Bennett for his channel Lyrical Lemonade. This music video has gained more than 396 million views as of March 2024, which is more than the original.

== Charts ==
=== Weekly charts ===
| Chart (2019) | Peak position |
|---|---|
| Canada (Canadian Hot 100) | 42 |
| Ireland (IRMA) | 75 |
| New Zealand Hot Singles (RMNZ) Remix | 40 |
| US Billboard Hot 100 | 36 |
| US Hot R&B/Hip-Hop Songs (Billboard) | 14 |
| US Rolling Stone Top 100 | 19 |

=== Year-end charts ===
| Chart (2019) | Position |
|---|---|
| Canada (Canadian Hot 100) | 95 |
| US Billboard Hot 100 | 92 |
| US Hot R&B/Hip-Hop Songs (Billboard) | 40 |
| US Rolling Stone Top 100 | 54 |

== Certifications ==
| Region | Certification | Certified units/sales |
|---|---|---|
| Canada (Music Canada) | 5× Platinum | 400,000^{‡} |
| Denmark (IFPI Danmark) Remix | Gold | 45,000^{‡} |
| Italy (FIMI) | Gold | 50,000^{‡} |
| New Zealand (RMNZ) | Platinum | 30,000^{‡} |
| United Kingdom (BPI) | Silver | 200,000^{‡} |
| United States (RIAA) | 3× Platinum | 3,000,000^{‡} |
| United States (RIAA) Remix | 2× Platinum | 2,000,000^{‡} |
^{‡} Sales+streaming figures based on certification alone.
