= NLE Choppa =

American rapper (born 2002)

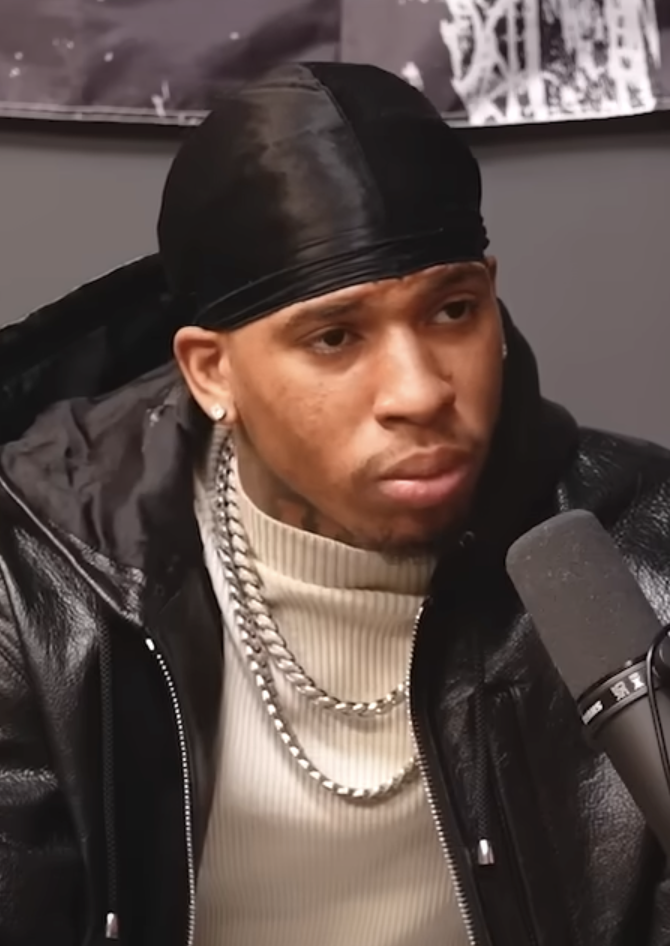
- NLE Choppa in 2025

Background information
- Also known as: YNR Choppa; Baby Mexico; Awakened Choppa; Top Shotta; NLE; NLE the Great
- Born: Bryson LaShun Potts; November 1, 2002 (age 24); Memphis, Tennessee, U.S.
- Genres: Southern hip-hop; trap; drill; gangsta rap
- Occupations: Rapper; songwriter; YouTuber
- Works: NLE Choppa discography
- Years active: 2018–present
- Labels: Warner; UnitedMasters; No Love
- Children: 2
- Website: nlethegreat.com

Bryson LaShun Potts (born November 1, 2002), known professionally as NLE Choppa (also known as NLE the Great, previously YNR Choppa), is an American rapper and YouTuber from Memphis, Tennessee. He gained recognition with the release of his 2019 single "Shotta Flow", which received platinum certification by the Recording Industry Association of America (RIAA) and peaked within the top 40 of the Billboard Hot 100. The song preceded his debut extended play (EP), Cottonwood, in December of that year.

Potts signed with Warner Records to release his debut studio album Top Shotta (2020), which peaked within the top ten of the US Billboard 200 and was supported by the top 40 singles "Camelot" and "Walk Em Down" (featuring Roddy Ricch). His fourth and fifth mixtapes, From Dark to Light (2020) and Me vs. Me (2022), preceded the release of his second studio album Cottonwood 2 (2023); its lead single, "Slut Me Out" (remixed featuring Sexyy Red), peaked within the Billboard Hot 100's top 30 and remains his highest entry on the chart.

== Early life ==
Bryson LaShun Potts was born on November 1, 2002, to an African American father and Jamaican mother. He was raised in the Parkway Village area of southeastern Memphis, Tennessee, and attended Cordova High School and Houston High School, where he played basketball. He began freestyling with childhood friends at the age of 15 and started taking music seriously at 16.

== Career ==
=== 2018–2019: Beginnings, breakthrough, record deal, and Cottonwood ===
Potts's manager is his mother, Angela Potts, who has been managing him since he started expressing an interest in rap music career. He released his first song, "No Love Anthem", in March 2018 under the name YNR Choppa. On July 22, he released his debut mixtape, No Love the Takeover. In December, he appeared on "No Chorus Pt. 3", a cypher-style song by his Shotta Fam collective. His opening verse and his dance moves in the accompanying music video made him stand out from the group, earning him an online buzz.

After the surge of popularity, he released his breakout single "Shotta Flow". The video reached 10 million views in a month. A few days after its release, Pitchfork highlighted the track as its Song of the Day, praising his energetic delivery and adding that "he hits a new dance move every time the camera cuts back to him". The song entered the Billboard Hot 100 in May 2019, debuting at number 96. It later peaked at number 36. The official remix, featuring Blueface and a Cole Bennett-directed music video, was released in June, shortly after the original song was certified platinum by the RIAA.

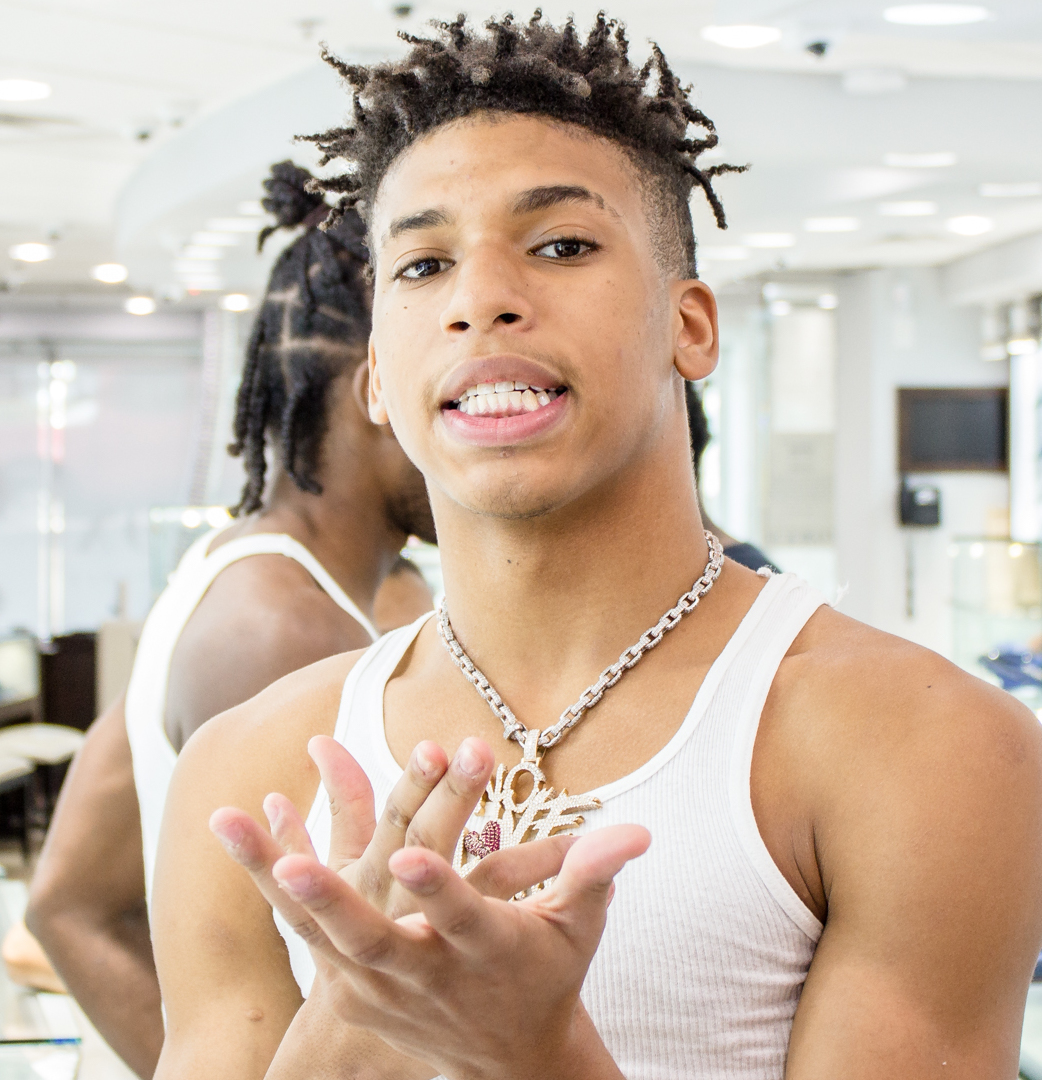
NLE Choppa in July 2019

In February, he released the song's sequel, "Shotta Flow 2". The video received 20 million views within two months, prompting Carl Lamarre from Billboard to say that his "recent dominance has silenced any detractors". It was around this time that it was reported that Choppa had sparked a bidding war between a handful of top record labels, with bids reaching a reported $3 million. He turned these offers down, from Republic Records, Interscope Records, Caroline, however, to instead sign with the independent distribution company, UnitedMasters including Neo Lechweny, while keeping his master recordings and publishing. In March, he released a new single called "Capo", with the music video debuting on Worldstarhiphop. Also in March, he was featured on Birdman and Juvenile's song "Dreams". In April 2019, NLE released another single called "Birdboy", produced by SGULL.

In May of the same year, Choppa released a new single, "Blocc Is Hot", produced by ATL Jacob. It was made as a tribute to his favorite childhood rapper, Lil Wayne. A few days later, he made his music festival debut by performing at the Beale Street Music Festival in Memphis. Bob Mehr of The Commercial Appeal praised his act, saying that he "did much to seize the opportunity on the big stage in his hometown" and that "his career is likely to see plenty more memorable Memphis moments." On June 14, 2019, he released the single, "Free YoungBoy", produced by CashMoneyAP. The music video has achieved over 19 million views on YouTube. The title of this song is a reference to rapper YoungBoy Never Broke Again, who was arrested for a parole violation after a shootout in Miami. This song was the first release from his own label No Love Entertainment (NLE), which he launched in partnership with Warner Records. According to Billboard magazine, No Love Entertainment is slated to release new music from Potts. On September 13, 2019, he released a new single titled "Camelot". The song peaked at number 37 in the US, becoming his second Top 40 hit, following "Shotta Flow".

On December 20, 2019, Potts released his debut extended play titled Cottonwood. The EP, named after the area he grew up in, features the previously released singles "Side" and his breakthrough hit "Shotta Flow" with its remix, featuring Blueface. The EP also consists of a collaboration with Meek Mill. To accompany the release of Cottonwood, a short film of the same name was released on the same day.

=== 2020: Top Shotta, From Dark to Light ===
Potts' debut studio album, Top Shotta was initially set for release in early 2020, and was preceded by multiple singles. He appeared on King Von's "Message" off the album Levon James. March 19, he released the album's lead single "Walk Em Down" with Roddy Ricch. On June 12, 2020, he released "Shotta Flow 5", the fourth sequel to his 2019 single "Shotta Flow". The single "Narrow Road" featuring Lil Baby released on July 30. One week later, on August 7, Top Shotta was released. On August 11, 2020, Potts was included on XXL's 2020 Freshman Class. On September 5, he vowed to stop rapping about violence, stating he has more to talk about and wants to "spread positivity and wake people up". On October 15, he announced a new project titled From Dark to Light, which was released on November 1, his birthday. The mix tape's cover art sees him sitting with his legs crossed in an outside setting, with butterflies around him and a rainbow in the distance; a nod to his new spiritual journey. On October 23, NLE released the music video for his song, "Narrow Road" featuring Lil Baby. The music video has over 30 million views on YouTube.

=== 2021–present: Me vs. Me ===
Choppa previously teased "Shotta Flow 6" and in February 2021, "Walk Em Down 2" with Lil Durk through a tweet. The latter is included on his fifth mixtape, Me vs. Me, which was released on January 28, 2022. It consists of 16 tracks and includes guest appearances from Young Thug, Polo G, G Herbo, and Moneybagg Yo. "Shotta Flow 6" was released on January 28, 2022, with an accompanying music video. It is the seventh single from Me Vs. Me, and is the sixth installment in the "Shotta Flow" series. In November of that year, he was featured on rapper Lambo40e's single "Self Esteem".

He released the single "Shotta Flow 7" in December 2023. In April 2025, Choppa released a children's book Cricket Stop Cricking. He released the book with the aim of promoting literacy in children.

== Musical style ==
Potts is noted for his "animated vocals" and energetic rapping and aggressive tones, which he notably employed on his breakout single, "Shotta Flow". His sound has also been described as "melodic", albeit "heavy-hitting". Jessica McKinney of Complex magazine stated he usually has a "wild and rambunctious" delivery in his verses. As a child, he listened to UGK and Lil Wayne; however, he recalls listening "to a lot of unreleased music all around the city" of Memphis.

== Personal life ==
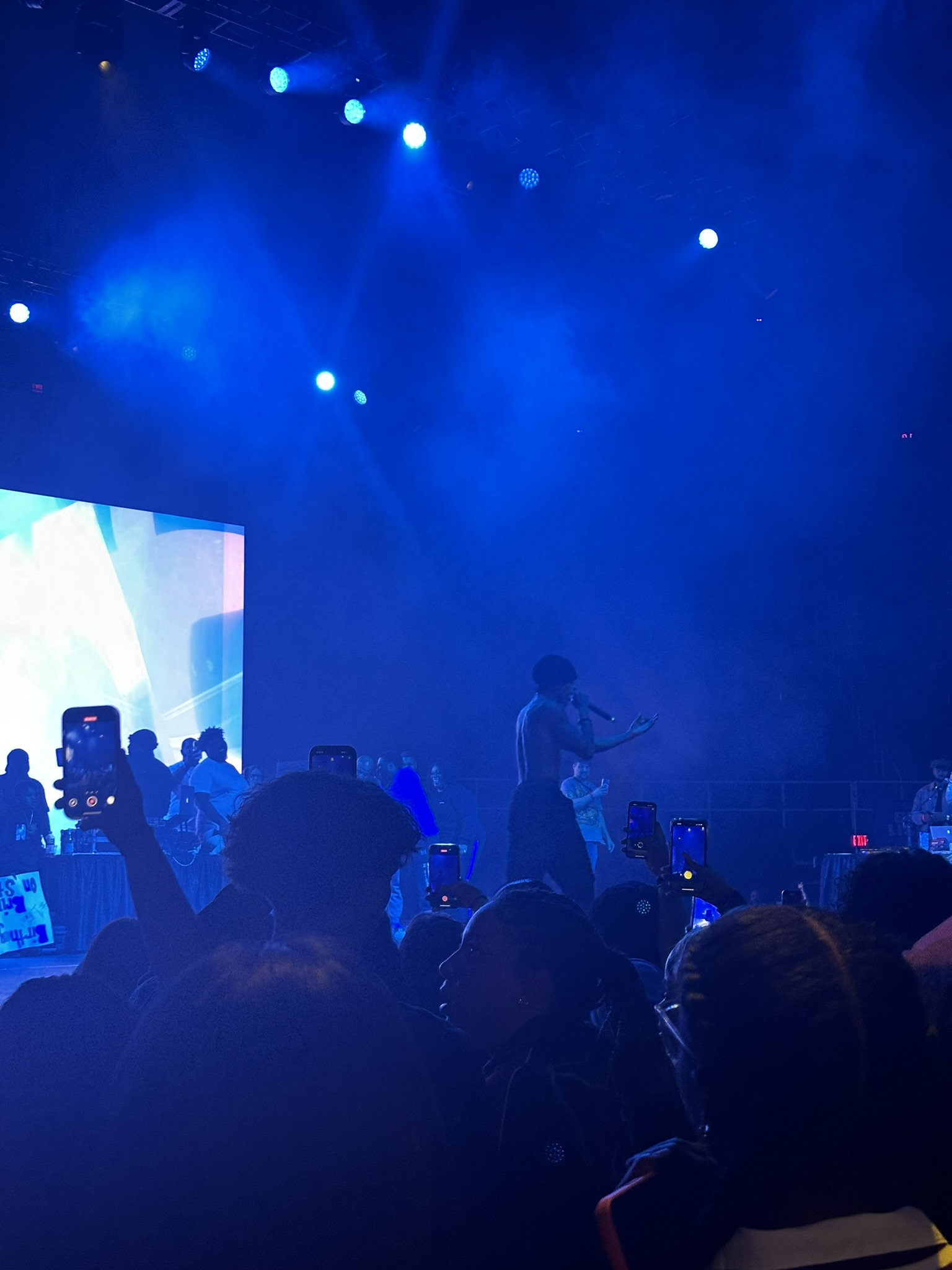
NLE Choppa performing at MVP Arena

Potts is a Christian and got baptised in August 2026, after releasing the gospel track Light It Up the previous month.

On June 20, 2020, Potts fathered his first child. He said, "I knew I needed to change and be a better person for my daughter".

In August 2020, Potts launched a YouTube channel called "Awakened Choppa", where he documented his holistic and healthier lifestyle, which included veganism and gardening.

During an unspecified time, Potts served time at a juvenile detention center, and said his time there motivated him to improve his behavior. In an episode of his YouTube series The Rise of NLE Choppa, he said being in jail helped him and was an "eye-opener".

On March 29, 2021, Potts was arrested for burglary, drug and weapon charges. He released a freestyle called "First Day Out" over the viral SpotemGottem's "Beat Box" beat.

On March 6, 2022, he announced that he and his then-girlfriend, Marissa Da'Nae, had lost their unborn son due to a miscarriage. On August 16, 2023, they welcomed Potts' second child and Da'Nae's first child.

Potts announced in December 2025 that he is engaged to singer Erica Ravén.

== Discography ==
Studio albums

- Top Shotta (2020)
- Cottonwood 2 (2023)
- Top Shotta 2 (2026)
