= Ensaios da Anitta =

Concert tours by Anitta

- Genre: Funk carioca, pop, Samba, Pagode and Axé
- Frequency: Annually
- Locations: Brazil, Portugal
- Years active: 2019–present
- Founder: Anitta
- Website: carnavaldaanitta.com.br

The Ensaios da Anitta are a series of live shows performed by singer Anitta, aimed at celebrating the pre-Carnival season in Brazil. Launched in January 2019, these events take place annually in January and February, traveling through various Brazilian cities such as Rio de Janeiro, São Paulo, Salvador, and Belo Horizonte. These shows were conceived by Anitta as a way to energize her audience for her Carnival street party, the "Bloco da Anitta", offering a mix of live music, dance, and themed performances.

Each edition of the Ensaios da Anitta has its own theme, which influences the visual production, including set design, costumes, and the overall aesthetic of the event. The theme often inspires the outfits of the attending audience, who frequently come dressed in costumes. An example of this was the 2024 edition, which featured the theme of samba schools.

The shows feature a setlist that blends various musical genres, including funk, pop, samba, pagode, and axé, reflecting the diversity of Brazilian popular music. In addition to Anitta's performances, the Ensaios also include special appearances by other popular artists in Brazil. Throughout the editions, artists such as Pabllo Vittar, Luísa Sonza, Gloria Groove, Leo Santana, Ferrugem, Jão, Psirico, among others, have taken the stage, offering the audience exclusive collaborations and joint performances.

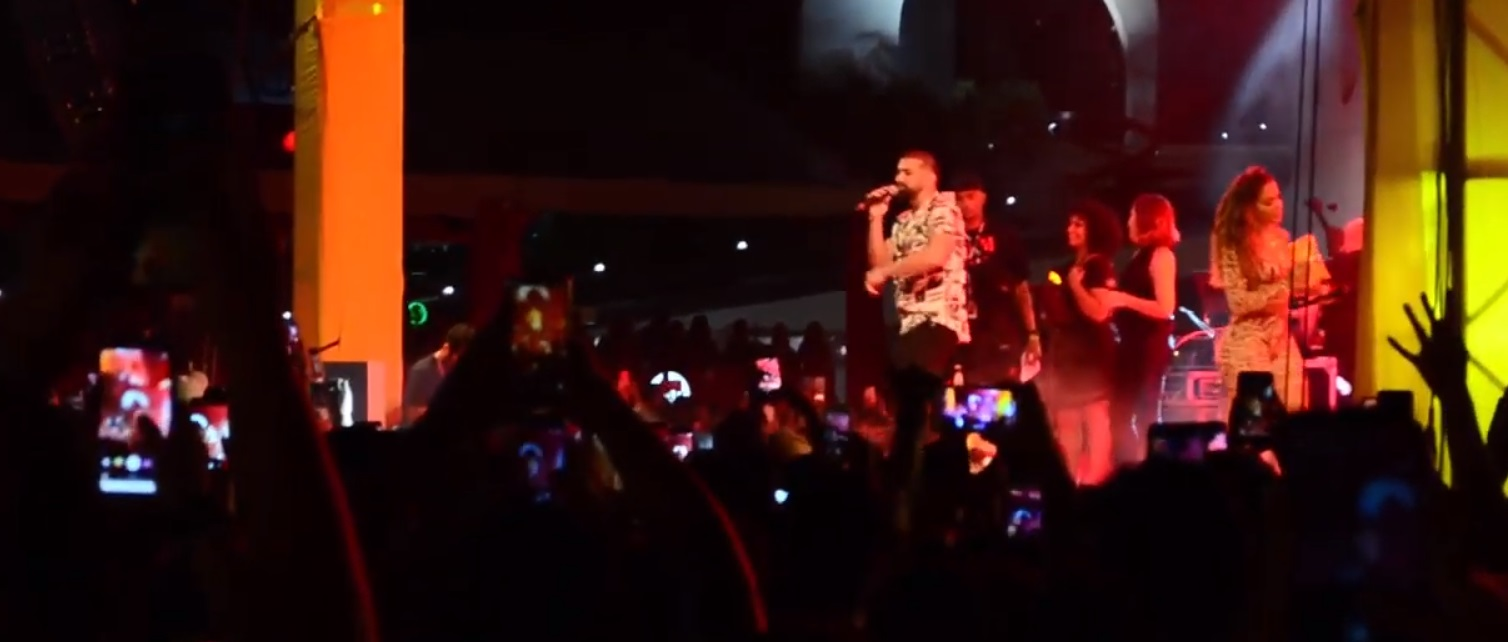
Ensaios da Anitta in 2020

The Ensaios da Anitta have stood out for their large-scale production and for being held in vast open-air venues, such as the Arena de Pernambuco, in Recife, and the Latin America Memorial, in São Paulo. The audience at these events is diverse, ranging from thousands of Anitta fans to others looking to enjoy the Carnival atmosphere. Since its inception, the event has seen tickets sell out quickly, establishing itself as one of the main attractions of the Brazilian summer calendar.

The growth of the project has led the Ensaios da Anitta to expand its presence to various regions of Brazil, becoming a traveling event that draws both tourists and locals alike. For 2025, Anitta has chosen the theme "Anitta Marathon", inspired by the Olympics and sports events. After the opening of the ensaios de 2025, Anitta shared that over 100,000 tickets were sold in a single day, with the São Paulo and Rio de Janeiro dates selling out in less than 40 minutes, prompting the addition of new dates.

The 2025 edition raised over 120 tons of non-perishable food for Indigenous communities.

== Internationalization ==
Anitta has announced plans to expand her pre-Carnival event, the "Ensaios da Anitta", to an international stage. The singer revealed that Portugal could be one of the first countries to host the project, noting that if her performance at the Festival Sudoeste is well received, it could encourage the team to take the event outside Brazil. On February 5, 2026, the singer confirmed the first international edition of the event, in Lisbon, Portugal.

== Editions ==
=== 2019 ===
Theme
Mariah Carey
| Date | City / State | Location | Guests | Ref. |
| January 20, 2019 | Rio de Janeiro, Rio de Janeiro | Jockey Club Brasileiro | Atitude 67; Melim; Tchakabum; Nego do Borel | |

=== 2020 ===
Theme
Animal Kingdom
| Date | City / State | Location | Guests | Ref. |
| January 12, 2020 | Rio de Janeiro, Rio de Janeiro | Jockey Club Brasileiro | MC Rebecca; Jorge Vercilo; DJ Zulu; Papatinho; Gaab | |
| January 25, 2020 | São Paulo, São Paulo | Latin America Memorial | Gustavo Mioto; Leo Santana; Dilsinho; Mila; DJ Zulu; DJ Luisa Viscardi | |
| January 26, 2020 | Rio de Janeiro, Rio de Janeiro | Jockey Club Brasileiro | MC Rebecca; Jorge Vercilo; DJ Zulu; Papatinho; Gaab | |
| February 19, 2020 | Salvador, Bahia | Circuito Barra-Ondina | Harmonia do Samba; Leo Santana | |
| February 26, 2020 | Rio de Janeiro, Rio de Janeiro | Lagoon | Psirico; Péricles | |

=== 2021 ===
Theme
Zodiac
| Date | City / State | Location | Guests | Ref. |
| February 13, 2021 | Angra dos Reis, Rio de Janeiro | Live | Márcio Victor | |

=== 2022 ===
Theme
Gamer
| Date | City / State | Location | Guests | Ref. |
| January 23, 2022 | Rio de Janeiro, Rio de Janeiro | Barra Olympic Park | Xand Avião; Dilsinho; L7NNON; Tchakabum | |
| January 29, 2022 | Guarapari, Espírito Santo | Cafe de la Musique | Pocah; Mc Danny | |
| February 12, 2022 | São Paulo, São Paulo | Latin America Memorial | Psirico; Atitude 67; Pabllo Vittar; MC Danny; Matheus Fernandes; Lexa | |
| February 13, 2022 | Rio de Janeiro, Rio de Janeiro | Barra Olympic Park | Psirico; Pedro Sampaio; Gloria Groove; Menos é Mais; Rennan da Penha; WC no BEAT; Felipe Mar; Jordana | |

=== 2023 ===
Theme
Female Warriors
| Date | City / State | Location | Guests | Ref. |
| January 7, 2023 | Salvador, Bahia | Centro de Convenções da Bahia | Psirico; Xanddy; Timbalada | |
| January 8, 2023 | Rio de Janeiro, Rio de Janeiro | Riocentro | Maiara & Maraisa; Kevin o Chris; Lexa; Filipe Ret; Matheus Fernandes; Hitmaker; Pocah; Rebecca | |
| January 14, 2023 | Florianópolis, Santa Catarina | P12 | WC no Beat; Zaac | |
| January 15, 2023 | São Paulo, São Paulo | Latin America Memorial | Gloria Groove; Valesca Popozuda; Xand Avião; Luedji Luna; Filipe Ret; Mc Lan; Mc Danny; Zaac | |
| January 21, 2023 | Brasília, Distrito Federal | Na Praia Parque | Mc Danny; Melim; DJ Guuga; Natiruts | |
| January 28, 2023 | Recife, Pernambuco | Arena de Pernambuco | Juliette; Luísa Sonza; Nattan; Priscila Senna | |
| January 29, 2023 | Rio de Janeiro, Rio de Janeiro | Riocentro | Dilsinho; Ferrugem; Silva; MC Cabelinho; MC Ryan SP; Banda Eva | |
| February 11, 2023 | São Paulo, São Paulo | Latin America Memorial | Pabllo Vittar; Jão; Mari Fernandez | |
| February 12, 2023 | Curitiba, Paraná | White Hall - Arena Jockey Eventos | Di Propósito; Zaac; WC no Beat | |
Setlist 2023: 1. "Simply the Best"; 2. "I'd Rather Have Sex"; 3. "Practice"; 4. "Envolver"; 5. '"Downtown"; 6. "Maria Elegante"; 7. "Me Gusta"; 8. "Lobby"; 9. "Faking Love"; 10. "Some que Ele Vem Atrás"; 11. "Loka"; 12. "Você Partiu Meu Coração"; 13. '"Essa Mina É Louca"; 14. "Contatinho"; 15. "Ai Papai"; 16. "Ela Não Vale Nada"; 17. "Mel"; 18. "Meiga e Abusada"; 19. "Zen"; 20. "Cobertor"; 21. "Bang"; 22. "Desce pro Play (Pa, Pa, Pa)"; 23. "Tá com o Papato"; 24. "Tudo Nosso"; 25. "Macetar"; 26. "Gata"; 27. "Bola Rebola"; 28. "Vai Malandra"; 29. "Zen"; 30. "Movimento da Sanfoninha"; 31. "Rave de Favela"; 32. "We Are the World of Carnaval"; 33. "Avisa Lá"; 34. "Combatchy"; 35. "Modo Turbo"; 36. "Onda Diferente"; 37. "Favela Chegou"; 38. "No Chão Novinha"; 39. "Que Rabão"; 40. "Show das Poderosas"; 41. "Boys Don't Cry"; 42. "Ai Papai"

=== 2024 ===
Theme
Samba School
| Date | City / State | Location | Guests | Ref. |
| January 6, 2024 | Salvador, Bahia | Centro de Convenções da Bahia | Ivete Sangalo; Dilsinho; Solange Almeida | |
| January 7, 2024 | Florianópolis, Santa Catarina | Arena Opus | Thiago Pantaleão; Marina Sena; Rogerinho | |
| January 13, 2024 | Brasília, Distrito Federal | Na Praia Parque | Pabllo Vittar; MC Daniel | |
| January 14, 2024 | Fortaleza, Ceará | Marina Park | Duda Beat; Felipe Amorim; Matuê | |
| January 20, 2024 | Recife, Pernambuco | Centro de Convenções | Marina Sena; Zé Vaqueiro; Raphaela Santos | |
| January 21, 2024 | Rio de Janeiro, Rio de Janeiro | Jockey Club Brasileiro | Pedro Sampaio; Lexa; L7nnon | |
| January 25, 2024 | São Paulo, São Paulo | Latin America Memorial | Claudia Leitte; Luísa Sonza; Teto; WIU; Manu Bahtidão | |
| January 27, 2024 | Belo Horizonte, Minas Gerais | Mineirão | Menos é Mais; Djonga; Lauana Prado; DJ Lucas Beat | |
| January 28, 2024 | Vitória, Espírito Santo | Clube Álvares Cabral | Pocah; Orochi; Luan Pereira | |
| February 3, 2024 | Curitiba, Paraná | Estádio Durival Britto e Silva | Ana Castela; Atitude 67; Kevinho | |
| February 4, 2024 | São Paulo, São Paulo | Latin America Memorial | Xand Avião; Veigh | |
Setlist 2024: 1. "Combatchy"; 2. "Modo Turbo"; 3. "Avisa Lá"; 4. "Envolver"; 5. "Bellakeo"; 6. "Terremoto"; 7. "Some que Ele Vem Atrás"; 8. "Loka"; 9. "Você Partiu Meu Coração"; 10. "Essa Mina É Louca"; 11. "Romance com Safadeza"; 12. "Ela Não Vale Nada"; 13. "Ai Papai"; 14. "Contatinho"; 15. "Cobertor"; 16. "Meiga e Abusada"; 17. "Zen"; 18. "Pilantra"; 19. "Bang"; 20. "Desce pro Play (Pa, Pa, Pa)"; 21. "Até o Céu"; 22. "Vai Vendo"; 23. "Lovezinho"; 24. "Nu"; 25. "Mil Veces (remix)" 26. "Menina Má"; 27. "Me Gusta"; 28. "Sua Cara"; 29. "Sin Miedo"; 30. "Joga pra Lua"; 31. "Tá com o Papato"; 32. "Tudo Nosso"; 33. "Movimento da Sanfoninha"; 34. "Bola Rebola"; 35. "Vai Malandra"; 36. "Onda Diferente"; 37. "Favela Chegou"; 38. "Rave de Favela"; 39. "No Chão Novinha"; 40. "Não Para"; 41. "Show das Poderosas"; 42. "Boys Don't Cry"

=== 2025 ===
| Theme | | Associated album | | |
|---|---|---|---|---|
| Party Marathon (Marotona de Jogação) | | Ensaios da Anitta | | |
| Date | City / State | Location | Guests | Ref. |
| January 11, 2025 | São Luís, Maranhão | Área Externa do São Luís Shopping | Viviane Batidão; J. Eskine | |
| January 12, 2025 | Fortaleza, Ceará | Marina Park | MC Danny; WIU; Simone Mendes | |
| January 18, 2025 | Salvador, Bahia | Centro de Convenções | Zé Vaqueiro; J. Eskine; Rogerinho | |
| January 19, 2025 | Brasília, Distrito Federal | Na Praia Parque | Xand Avião; Felipe Amorim | |
| January 25, 2025 | Recife, Pernambuco | Área Externa do Cecon | MC Daniel; Priscila Senna; Rogerinho | |
| January 26, 2025 | Ribeirão Preto, São Paulo | Estádio do Comercial | Lauana Prado; Pabllo Vittar; Matheus Fernandes | |
| February 1, 2025 | Belo Horizonte, Minas Gerais | Mineirão | Rogério Flausino; Henry Freitas | |
| February 2, 2025 | Campinas, São Paulo | Red Eventos - Área Externa | Felipe Amorim; Thiaguinho; Jonas Esticado | |
| February 8, 2025 | Rio de Janeiro, RJ | Marina da Glória | MC Cabelinho; Grelo; Mari Fernandez | |
| February 9, 2025 | Rio de Janeiro, RJ | Marina da Glória | Nattan; Dennis; Dilsinho | |
| February 15, 2025 | Curitiba, Paraná | Pedreira Paulo Leminski | Xamã; Mari Fernandez | |
| February 16, 2025 | Florianópolis, Santa Catarina | Arena Floripa | Luan Pereira; Orochi | |
| February 22, 2025 | São Paulo, SP | Villa-Lobos State Park | Xand Avião; Jão; Veigh; MC Danny | |
| February 23, 2025 | São Paulo, SP | Villa-Lobos State Park | Ana Castela; Nattan; Gloria Groove; Livinho | |

=== 2026 ===
| Theme | | | Associated album | | |
|---|---|---|---|---|---|
| Cosmos | | | Ensaios da Anitta | | |
| Date | Country | City / State | Location | Guests | Ref. |
| January 10, 2026 | Brazil | Belém, Pará | Mangueirão | MC Danny; Viviane Batidão; Gaby Amarantos | |
| January 11, 2026 | Brazil | Fortaleza, Ceará | Marina Park | Felipe Amorim; Xand Avião; Melody; Henry Freitas | |
| January 17, 2026 | Brazil | Recife, Pernambuco | Área Externa do Cecon | Nattan; Priscila Senna; Raphaela Santos | |
| January 18, 2026 | Brazil | Brasília, Distrito Federal | Mané Garrincha | J. Eskine; Rogerinho; DJ Guuga | |
| January 25, 2026 | Brazil | Rio de Janeiro, RJ | Riocentro | Henry Freitas; Viviane Batidão; Xand Avião; Pocah; Daniela Mercury | |
| January 24, 2026 | Brazil | Campinas, São Paulo | Sambódromo de Paulínia | Zé Vaqueiro; WIU; Gloria Groove | |
| January 25, 2026 | Brazil | Rio de Janeiro, RJ | Riocentro | Pedro Sampaio; Melody; Irmãs de Pau; MC Cabelinho; Felipe Amorim | |
| January 31, 2026 | Brazil | Curitiba, Paraná | Estádio Vila Capanema | Karol Conká; Tchakabum; Maiara & Maraisa | |
| February 1, 2026 | Brazil | Ribeirão Preto, São Paulo | Estádio Palma Travassos | Mari Fernandez; Léo Foguete; Hitmaker | |
| February 7, 2026 | Brazil | Belo Horizonte, Minas Gerais | Mineirão | Matheus Fernandes; Kelly Key; Felipe Amorim | |
| February 8, 2026 | Brazil | São Paulo, SP | Pacaembu Stadium | Marina Sena; Nattan; Dennis DJ; Viviane Batidão; Felipe Amorim; Pabllo Vittar | |
| July 18, 2026 | Portugal | Lisbon, Portugal | Passeio Marítimo de Algés | Fred de Palma; Bárbara Bandeira; Calema; Viviane Batidão | |

== See also ==
- Bloco da Anitta
- List of Anitta live performances
