= Danny Bond =

Brazilian rapper and singer (born 1997)

- Born: Daniela da Silva Barros; 23 July 1997 (age 28); Maceió, Alagoas, Brazil
- Occupations: rapper; singer; songwriter; dancer
- Years active: 2015–present
- Musical career
- Genres: Funk; rap; pop
- Instruments: Vocals
- Labels: Independent, ONErpm

Daniela da Silva Barros (born 23 July 1997), known professionally as Danny Bond, is a Brazilian rapper, singer, songwriter, and dancer. She is the first Black travesti musician to reach the top of the iTunes Brazil chart six times, establishing herself as a leading LGBTQIA+ voice from Alagoas. An emerging phenomenon in Brazil's queer pop scene, Danny Bond has brought the vibrant culture of Alagoas’ peripheries to a national audience, becoming one of the few contemporary artists from the state to gain widespread recognition.

Since childhood, Danny Bond showed a passion for singing and dancing, often imitating artists she saw on television. Her career officially began in 2015, when she went viral with the parody "Ai Meu Deus" — also known as “Rainha do Jacintinho” (Queen of Jacintinho), a title that earned her the affectionate nickname. The song, written by her, is a Portuguese-language reinterpretation of "Anaconda", a hit by her biggest inspiration in rap and favorite artist: the Trinidadian singer-songwriter Nicki Minaj.

In early 2019, she reached ninth place on Spotify's "Virais do Brasil" playlist. Shortly after, she experienced a memorable moment when she heard a crowd of over one million people singing her hits during the São Paulo Carnival, where she had been invited to perform by drag queen Pabllo Vittar. In 2020, she gained even more national visibility with the viral remix of her song "Tcheca" and "Say So" by American singer Doja Cat.

The rapper, an independent artist, became known for her explicitly sexual lyrics filled with profanity, as in the hits "Tcheca" (2017), "PPK" (2021), and "Cachorra Absurda" (2024), featuring MC Naninha. However, she has also demonstrated versatility in lighter tracks, such as "Te Deixo Crazy" (2021), featuring Thiago Pantaleão, and "Barbie" (2022), featuring Rebecca, Pocah, and Lexa.

== Personal life ==
Born in the Bolão favela in Maceió, the capital of Alagoas, Danny Bond, the stage name of Daniela da Silva Barros, is a Black travesti from a humble background. After her parents separated, she and her mother moved to the Jacintinho neighborhood, where she lived for many years. It is there that she has felt safe since adolescence.

Later, although her father attempted to reconnect, Daniela chose to remain by her mother's side. "We went through a lot of difficulties, she and I. When we needed him the most, he never helped. Now he wants to come back, but I prefer to stay here with my mother," (Note: Portuguese Original: "Nós passamos, ela e eu, (por) muitas dificuldades. Quando a gente mais precisou dele, ele nunca ajudou. Aí agora ele está querendo vir atrás, mas eu prefiro ficar aqui com minha mãe.") she reveals.

== Career ==
=== 2015–2016: Early Internet Parodies ===
In 2015, Danny Bond made her first online release with "Ai Meu Deus" — also known as "Rainha do Jacintinho", a nickname that has stuck with her ever since. The song is a Portuguese-language parody of "Anaconda" by rapper Nicki Minaj. Although it was not released on streaming platforms, the track went viral on social media such as YouTube and Facebook, marking the beginning of her artistic career.

The following year, in 2016, the singer released another Nicki Minaj-inspired parody, "Eu Faço Boquete", a reinterpretation of "Feeling Myself", a collaboration between Minaj and Beyoncé.

=== 2017–2019: Epica ===
Danny Bond's first studio album, Epica, was released in 2017, with musical production by Paraíba musician Fabregas. The project gained attention and, in 2019, earned her an invitation to perform in drag queen Pabllo Vittar's carnival block — an artist Bond had known since her early hits. In fact, she had opened Pabllo's first show in Maceió. Among the tracks on the album, the most notable were "Tcheca", "Meu Nome É Bond", and "Prikito". The latter gained such prominence that it reached international producer Diplo, who shared a snippet of the lyrics on his Instagram account.

In 2018, Danny Bond and longtime friend and collaborator Kika Boom released the song "Loka de Pinga", a humorous Portuguese-language parody of "End Game", a hit by American singer Taylor Swift.

=== 2020–2023: Mashup with Doja Cat's song and Caceteira ===
In 2020, it was Kika Boom who suggested that Danny Bond combine her track "Tcheca" with the hit "Say So" by American rapper Doja Cat. The mashup was produced by Satan, a friend of both artists, and published on his YouTube channel. The new version quickly went viral on TikTok, gaining national attention and further boosting the rapper's popularity. The success was so significant that live performance proposals with Doja Cat were discussed, one of them during her participation at Lollapalooza Brasil 2022. The performance would have been part of a promotional campaign by the dating app Tinder, of which both were ambassadors. Another alternative proposal was also considered, but none of the initiatives came to fruition. Despite this, Doja Cat herself listened to the mashup and reportedly liked it. For Danny Bond, this recognition alone was already meaningful. Another outcome of the remix's popularity was an invitation for the singer to participate as a commentator at the 2021 Billboard Music Awards, an event where Doja was one of the nominees. Later in 2020, Danny Bond released the first single from her new project, the trap song "Traz o B", which features an interpolation of "Money Bag" by rapper Cardi B. In the same year, she became the first LGBTQIA+ artist to participate in the Acústicos do Sofá series on the Tidal platform — an edition that remains the most engaged in the series to date.

In 2021, Danny Bond made history by becoming the first travesti in Latin America to star in a bank advertising campaign, appearing in an action for the digital bank WillBank. In May, she released the track "Te Deixo Crazy", a collaboration with singer Thiago Pantaleão, who invited her to the project. The song quickly reached the top of the iTunes Brazil singles chart. Later, in October, she released the single "PPK", which blends forró, rap, and brega funk, as the second release from her latest album. The track made her the first trans woman to simultaneously top the iTunes Brazil singles chart, Spotify's Viral Maceió chart, and trend on Twitter. She also became, at that time, the only Black travesti to reach the top of the iTunes Brazil chart twice.

In January 2022, the Alagoas singer featured on the track "Barbie" by singer Rebecca, alongside Pocah and Lexa. By that month, Danny Bond had accumulated over 235,000 monthly listeners on Spotify. She was also one of the ambassadors for the As Vozes do Funk LGBTQIA+ project, an initiative in partnership with Instagram Brasil and her distributor, ONErpm. In March, she released the third single from her upcoming album, "Volte Sempre", in collaboration with Potyguara Bardo. The following month, she participated in the title track of the album Minas de Ouro by the duo Hyperanhas. In November, she released the fourth single from the album, "Vai Maluca". On 18 November, her second studio album, Caceteira, was released, celebrating her Northeastern Brazilian roots and blending influences of forró, rap, and funk. The project features collaborations with other Northeastern artists, including Kaya Conky, Potyguara Bardo, Chau do Pife, and Getúlio Abelha. The following year, she launched the Caceteira Tour, a tour promoting the album.

In February 2023, Danny Bond and Simone Mendes starred together in an advertising campaign for the digital bank WillBank. The campaign included the song "Movimenta e Monta", performed by both artists and released with a music video on social media. Danny Bond, who attended shows of the band Forró do Muído in small towns in Alagoas during her youth—a band created by Frank Aguiar that once included Simone and her sister Simaria as members—revealed that Simone is one of her major inspirations. In June, Danny Bond collaborated with musician Romero Ferro on the song "Difícil de Esquecer", which also features DJ Zullu.

=== 2024–present: Epica 2 ===
In 2024, Danny Bond was invited to perform at the São Paulo Pride Parade, one of Brazil's major LGBTQIA+ events. Her third album, Epica 2 — a direct continuation of her debut record — was released on August 29. On this project, the artist returns to her roots in rap and pop while incorporating popular rhythms from her hometown of Maceió, such as reggae and brega funk. The musical direction was led by producer PZZS. The album features remixed and shortened versions of some of the singer's most iconic parodies, which previously circulated exclusively on social media. "Ai Meu Deus", now retitled "Rainha do Jacintinho (Ai Meu Deus)" and remixed by PZZS, and "Eu Faço Boquete", produced by the duo CyberKills in collaboration with PZZS, received new arrangements and were officially released on streaming platforms. In addition to these reimaginings, the album includes new tracks written by PZZS, such as "Eu Faço Subir", "Cachorra Absurda" — a collaboration with baile funk singer MC Naninha — and "Melo do Chupa Chupa", a collaboration with the contemporary Northeastern band Deuses do Swing. The project also contains remixes of "Tcheca", produced by DJ Ramemes, and “Rola Preta”, produced by musicians Clementaum and Dry. On the day of its release, Epica 2 debuted at number one on the iTunes Brazil album chart, while the track "Cachorra Absurda" reached the top of the platform's song ranking. In October, Danny Bond released the single "Travessuras ou Rolas Duras?" as part of the Halloween celebrations.

At the beginning of 2025, the deluxe edition of Epica 2 was announced, featuring a new set of unreleased tracks. Released on February 6, the expanded edition includes five new songs, all produced by PZZS, and incorporates the two latest singles: "Travessuras ou Rolas Duras?" and "Chacina" — the latter debuted on the same day as the deluxe edition, accompanied by a music video, and features the duo Irmãs de Pau. The other tracks on the edition are "Bond+", "Xoxota", and "Quem Quer?". In April, the rapper reunited with producer PZZS, this time alongside singer MC Jéssica do Escadão for the release of the collaboration "Tiro de Leite". To celebrate her birthday and the success of her latest album, Danny Bond announced the event Baile da Bond. The first show took place in her hometown of Maceió.

== Discography ==
=== Studio albums ===
List of studio albums with selected details
| Title | Details |
|---|---|
| Epica | Released: 22 December 2017; Label: Independent, ONErpm; Formats: Digital download, streaming |
| Caceteira | Released: 18 November 2022; Label: Independent, ONErpm; Formats: Digital download, streaming |
| Epica 2 | Released: 29 August 2024; Label: Independent, ONErpm; Formats: Digital download, streaming |

=== Singles ===
==== As lead artist ====
| Title | Year | Album |
|---|---|---|
| "Cheira Esse Loló" (Remix) (featuring Marcelo Camara) | 2018 | Non-album single |
| "Tiroteiro da Trava" | 2019 | Non-album single |
| "Aquecimento da Bond" | 2019 | Non-album single |
| "Traz o B" | 2020 | Caceteira |
| "PPK" | 2021 | Caceteira |
| "Volte Sempre" (with Potyguara Bardo) | 2022 | Caceteira |
| "Vai Maluca" | 2022 | Caceteira |
| "Rainha do Jacintinho (Ai Meu Deus)" | 2024 | Epica 2 |
| "Eu Faço Boquete" | 2024 | Epica 2 |
| "Travessuras ou Rolas Duras?" | 2024 | Epica 2 (Deluxe) |
| "Chacina" (with Irmãs de Pau) | 2025 | Epica 2 (Deluxe) |
| "Tiro de Leite" (with MC Jéssica do Escadão) | 2025 | Epica 2 (Edição Completa) |

==== As featured artist ====
| Title | Year | Album |
|---|---|---|
| "T.Q.R." (Maju Shanii featuring Danny Bond) | 2018 | Non-album single |
| "Loka de Pinga" (Kika Boom featuring Danny Bond) | 2018 | Non-album single |
| "Cagar no Pau" (A Travestis featuring Danny Bond) | 2021 | Respeita as Travestis |
| "Te Deixo Crazy" (Thiago Pantaleão featuring Danny Bond) | 2021 | Non-album single |
| "Barbie" (Rebecca featuring Pocah, Lexa and Danny Bond) | 2022 | Non-album single |
| "Minas de Ouro" (Hyperanhas featuring Danny Bond and Caio Passos) | 2022 | Minas de Ouro |
| "Kama Surta" (Remix) (Dornelles featuring Danny Bond and Malharo) | 2022 | Non-album single |
| "Emoji de Fogo" (Remix) (Chameleo featuring Danny Bond and CyberKills) | 2022 | Non-album single |
| "Díficil de Esquecer" (Romero Ferro featuring Danny Bond and DJ Zullu) | 2023 | Non-album single |
| "Fuder Chapada" (Remix) (Kaya Conky featuring Danny Bond, S4TAN and DJ Ramemes) | 2024 | Non-album single |
| "Nutela" (Tonny Hyung featuring Danny Bond and Rennan da Penha) | 2024 | Non-album single |

==== Promotional singles ====
| Title | Year | Album |
|---|---|---|
| "Independência da Tcheca" | 2021 | Non-album single |
| "Movimenta e Monta" (with Simone Mendes) | 2023 | Non-album single |
