= Bloco da Anitta =

Brazilian annual carnival street party

- Genre: Funk carioca, Pop, Samba, Pagode and Axé
- Frequency: Annually
- Locations: Rio de Janeiro, São Paulo, Salvador
- Country: Brazil
- Years active: 2016–present
- Founder: Anitta
- Website: carnavaldaanitta.com.br

Bloco da Anitta, previously Bloco das Poderosas, is a carnival street party from Rio de Janeiro and Salvador, but it has also paraded in other cities, created by the Brazilian singer Anitta. On 14 January 2016, the bloco was officially launched in Rio de Janeiro during its first rehearsal.

During the 2020s, Bloco da Anitta became listed among the 20 largest Carnival street parties in Brazil.

== History ==
The bloco was originally created under the name Bloco das Poderosas.

Five rehearsals were held between January and February 2016, with three taking place at the Monte Líbano club in Rio de Janeiro and two at Alto do Andu in Salvador. During four of the rehearsals, Anitta welcomed Harmonia do Samba and Banda Eva to the stage.

In 2019, the singer created the "Ensaios da Anitta" as a pre-event for her Carnival block, a series of live rehearsals that allow fans to follow the preparation and evolution of the bloco's shows. The project offers a behind-the-scenes look at the choreography and musical productions that are part of the performances.

Subsequently, as it was already informally called "Bloco da Anitta", this name was officially adopted.

In 2024, it paraded from Rua Primeiro de Março, 1 to Av. Pres. Antônio Carlos, 12, in downtown Rio de Janeiro, on the Saturday after Carnival, from 7 am to noon. It was considered the highlight of the first day of the city's "post-Carnival" celebrations.

== Court ==
Position	Year				
Position	2016	2017	2018	2019	2020–2024
Queen	Giovanna Ewbank	Thaila Ayala	Giovanna Ewbank	Luísa Sonza	
King	Marcus Majella				
Godmother	Gabriela Pugliesi	Monique Alfradique			
Godfather	David Brazil				
Carnival Muse	Monique Alfradique	Isabella Santoni	Giovanna Lancellotti		
Carnival Muse	Klebber Toledo	Marcelo Mello Jr.	Alesso	Eri Johnson	
Gata		Bianca Andrade	Cacau Protásio	Cynthia Senek	
Gato		André Nicolau			
Diva			Jojo Maronttini		
Honorary Court	Bruno Gagliasso	Bruno de Luca	Sabrina Sato Thaynara OG	Luísa Mell Léo Kret	

== Agenda ==
=== Essays ===
Date	City	Location	Guest artist(s)	Ref.
Brazil
14 January 2016	Rio de Janeiro	Clube Monte Líbano	Banda Eva; Harmonia do Samba	
28 January 2016	Rio de Janeiro	Clube Monte Líbano	Banda Vingadora; Tchakabum	
9 February 2017	Rio de Janeiro	Clube Monte Líbano	Tchakabum; Terra Samba	
11 February 2017	São Paulo	The Week	Preta Gil; Tati Quebra-Barraco	
14 January 2018	Rio de Janeiro	The Beach House	Harmonia do Samba; Tchakabum	
20 January 2018	São Paulo	The Week	Jojo Maronttinni	

=== Desfiles oficiais ===
Date	City	Location	Guest artist(s)	Public	Ref.
Brazil
13 February 2016	Rio de Janeiro	Rua Primeiro de Março	Nego do Borel	200.000	
24 February 2017	Salvador	Circuito Barra-Oninda	EdCity		
4 March 2017	Rio de Janeiro	Rua Primeiro de Março	Pabllo Vittar; Nego do Borel; Aviões do Forró	400.000	
9 February 2018	Salvador	Circuito Barra-Oninda	Àttooxxá		
17 February 2018	Rio de Janeiro	Avenida Presidente Antônio Carlos	Clau; Luísa Sonza; Jojo Maronttinni; Nego do Borel; Alesso; Xand Avião	530.000	
1 March 2019	Salvador	Circuito Barra-Oninda	Steve Aoki; Jerry Smith		
9 March 2019	Rio de Janeiro	Rua Primeiro de Março	Lexa; Alesso; Jared Garcia	420.000	
21 February 2020	Salvador	Circuito Barra-Ondina			
29 February 2020	Rio de Janeiro	Avenida Presidente Antônio Carlos	Mc Rebecca; Luísa Sonza	370.000	
1 March 2020	São Paulo	Parque Ibirapuera	Lexa; Thiago Martins; DJ Zulu; Pedro Sampaio	2.000.000	
17 February 2023	Salvador	Circuito Barra-Ondina	Oh Polêmico		
25 February 2023	Rio de Janeiro	Rua Primeiro de Março	Jason Derulo; Saulo Fernandes; Zaac	1.000.000	
9 February 2024	Salvador	Circuito Barra-Ondina	Marina Sena; MC Daniel; Lexa; Bruno Magnata		
17 February 2024	Rio de Janeiro	Rua Primeiro de Março	Dennis DJ; Justin Quiles; Lenny Tavarez	1.000.000	
28 February 2025	Salvador	Circuito Barra-Ondina			
8 March 2025	Rio de Janeiro	Rua Primeiro de Março			
