= Ocean Avenue =

Ocean Avenue may refer to:

== Roads in the United States ==
- Ocean Avenue (San Francisco), California, see Ocean Avenue/CCSF Pedestrian Bridge station
- Ocean Avenue (Santa Monica), California
- Ocean Avenue (Palm Beach), Florida; see Florida State Road A1A § Major intersections
- Ocean Avenue (Daytona Beach), Florida; see Daytona Beach Boardwalk
- Ocean Avenue (Brooklyn), New York
- Ocean Avenue (Asbury Park), New Jersey; see Olympia Trails § Former operations

== Entertainment ==
- Ocean Avenue (album), a 2003 album by Yellowcard
  - "Ocean Avenue" (song), the title track
- Ocean Ave., a 2002–2003 Swedish-American soap opera

== See also ==
- Oceanic Avenue, Salvador, Bahia, Brazil
