= Barra (neighborhood) =

Coordinates: 13.0029015°S 38.5331701°W

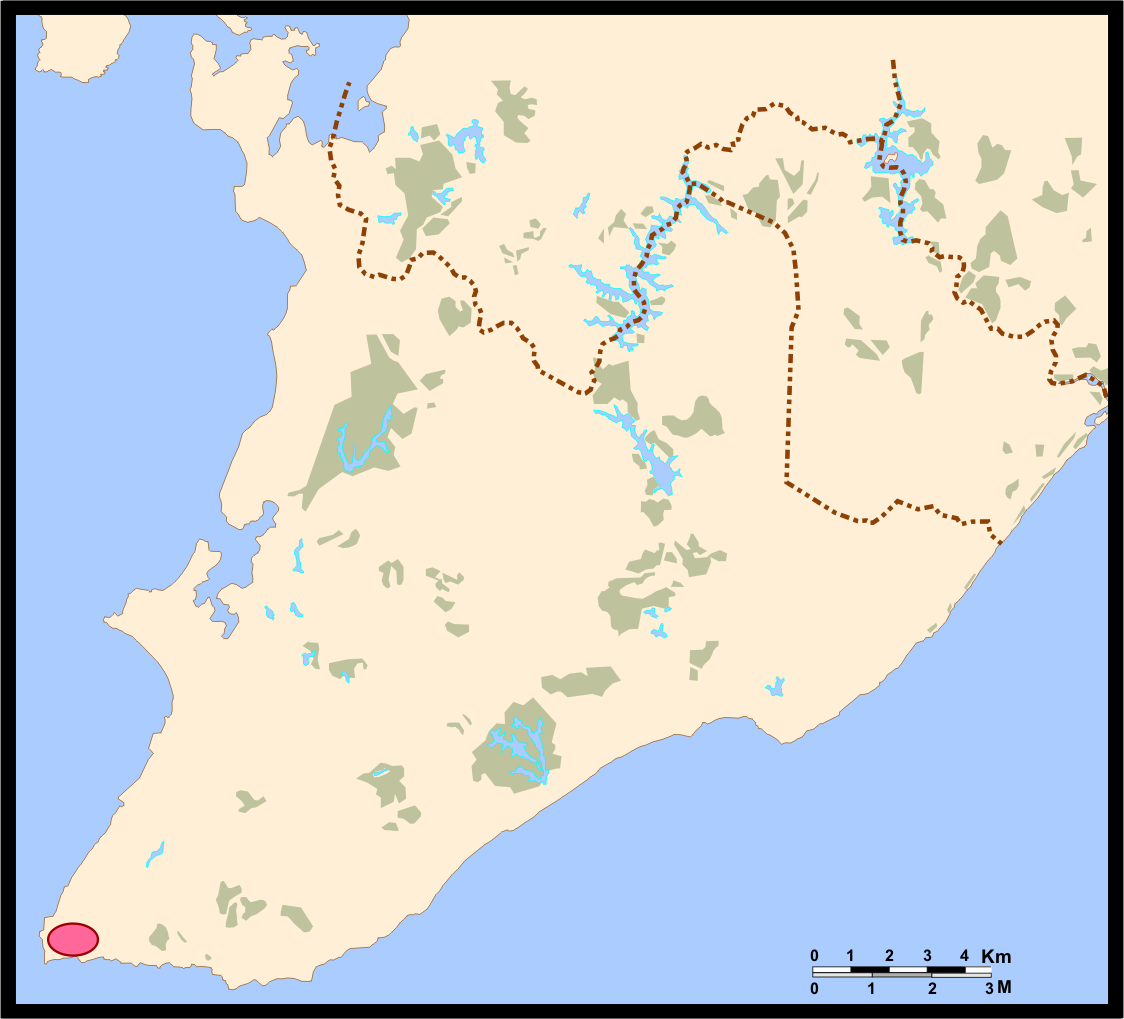
Location of Barra in Salvador, Brazil.

Barra is a neighborhood located in the south zone of the city of Salvador, Bahia, Brazil. Barra is one of the most traditional neighborhoods of the city, and is also one of the most popular neighborhoods for tourists, with many attractions, like Farol da Barra Lighthouse, Morro do Cristo Hill, Farol da Barra Beach, and Porto da Barra Beach.

Barra has a large number of beaches, shops, cafes, restaurants, bars, nightclubs, residences, fitness clubs, banks, parks, events, and historic monuments. The neighborhood is subdivided in the following areas: Jardim Brasil, Porto da Barra, Avenida Centenário, and Ladeira da Barra. The beach neighborhood closest to Pelourinho, which also has a lot of tourist infrastructure.

It is bathed by the Atlantic Ocean to the south and the entrance to the All Saints Bay to the west. And in preserving its landscape a considerable body of historical and architectural value to Brazil, and the Lighthouse is the most famous icon, alongside the strengths of St. Mary and St. Diogo.

The district is home of the renowned Portuguese Hospital ("Hospital Português") and the Spanish Hospital ("Hospital Espanhol"), both founded by these two countries in the city. Shopping Barra mall is the main and largest shopping center of the developed south zone of Salvador. Besides being a neighborhood with many hotels and apartments to rent, especially during Brazilian carnival.

Language institutes, such as, Alliance française (French) and Instituto Cervantes (Spanish), have branches in Barra. Also the neighborhood is famous nationally and internationally for its Carnival and New Year's Eve.

== History ==
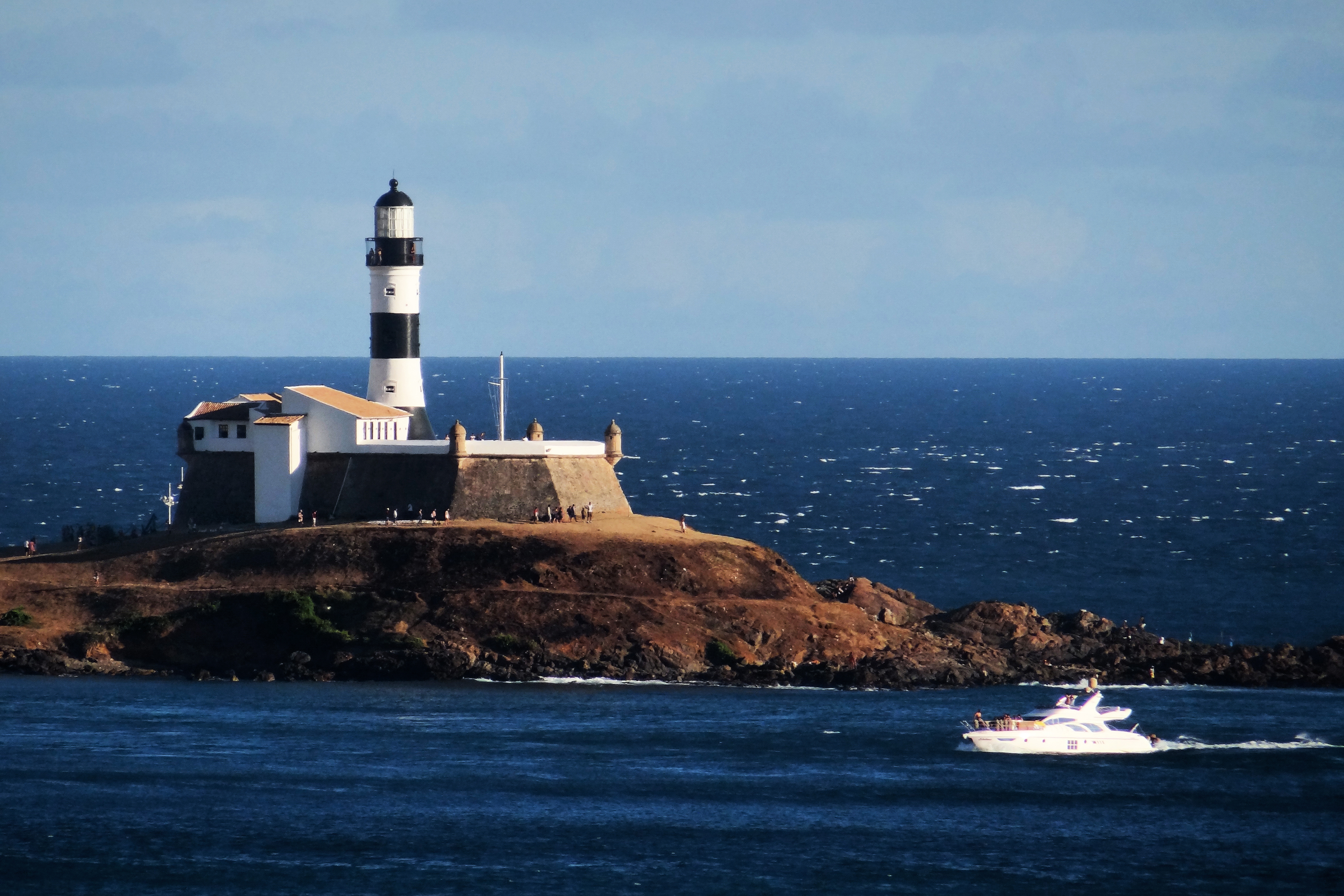
Farol da Barra Lighthouse.

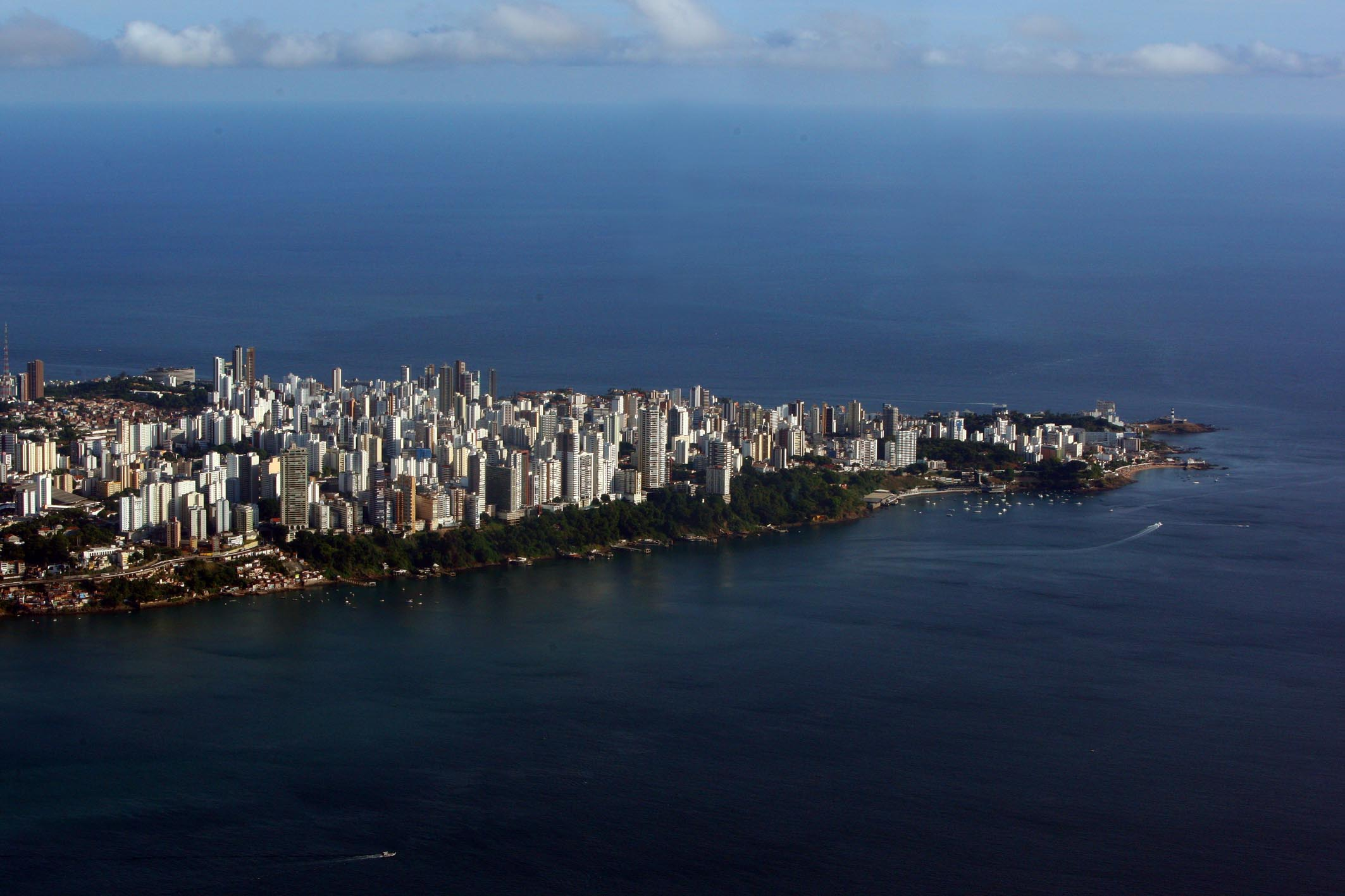
Barra in the extreme South Point.

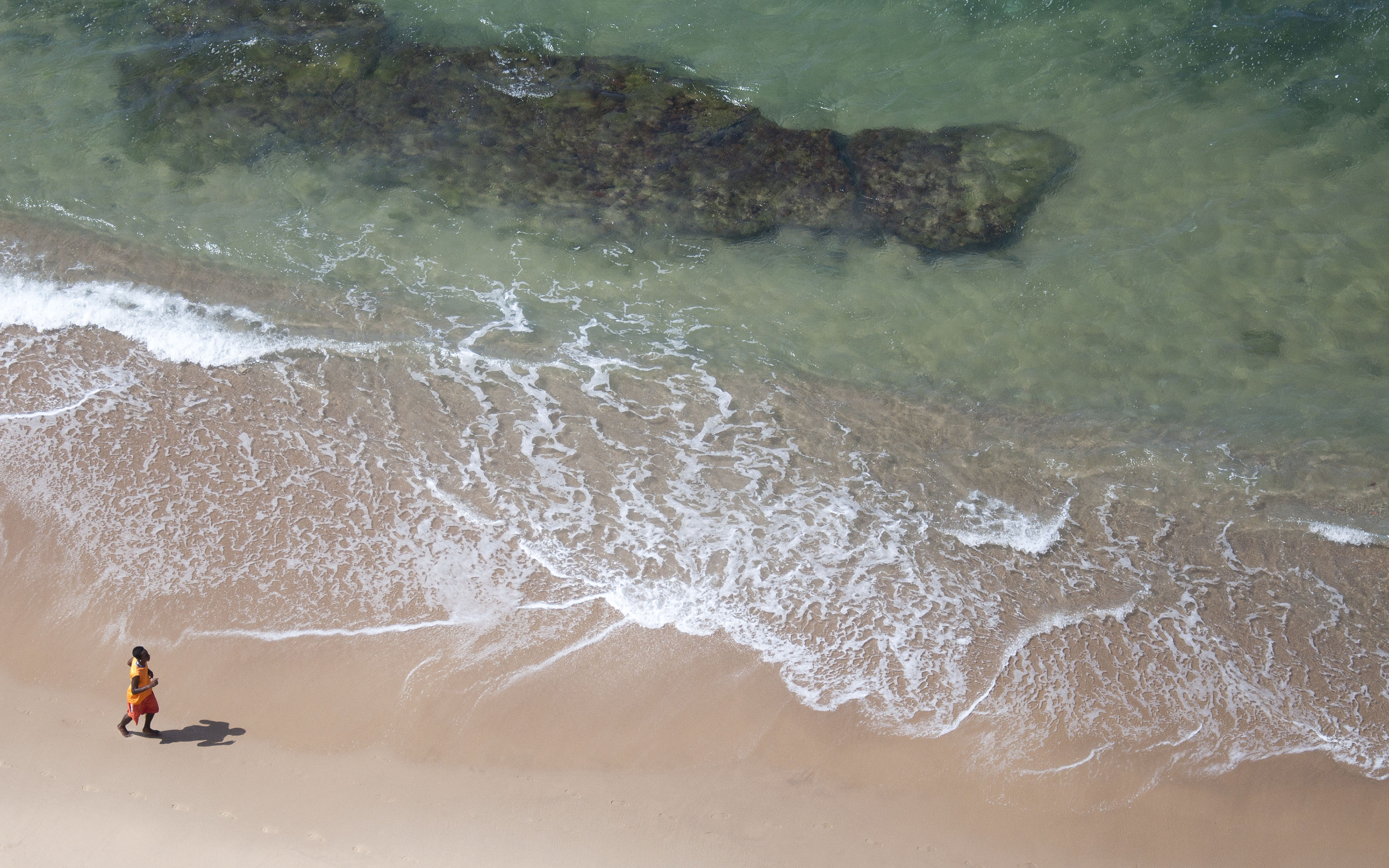
Barra beach.

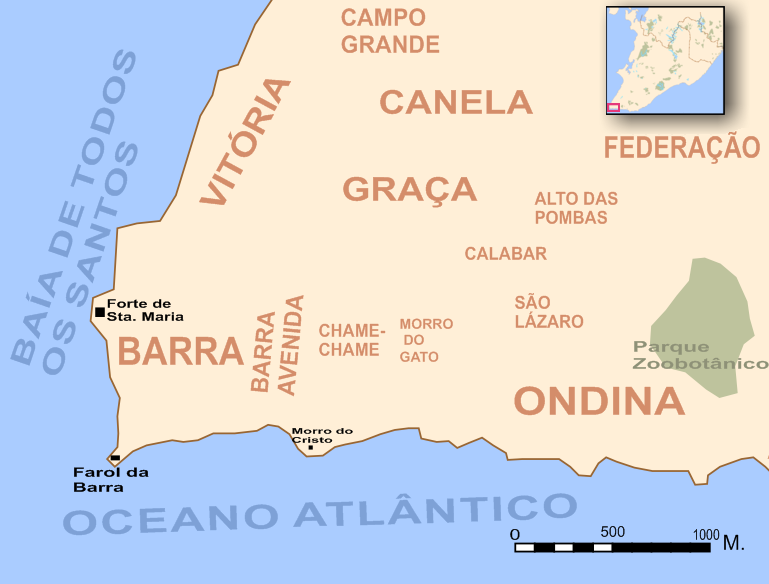
Barra and the other neighborhoods.

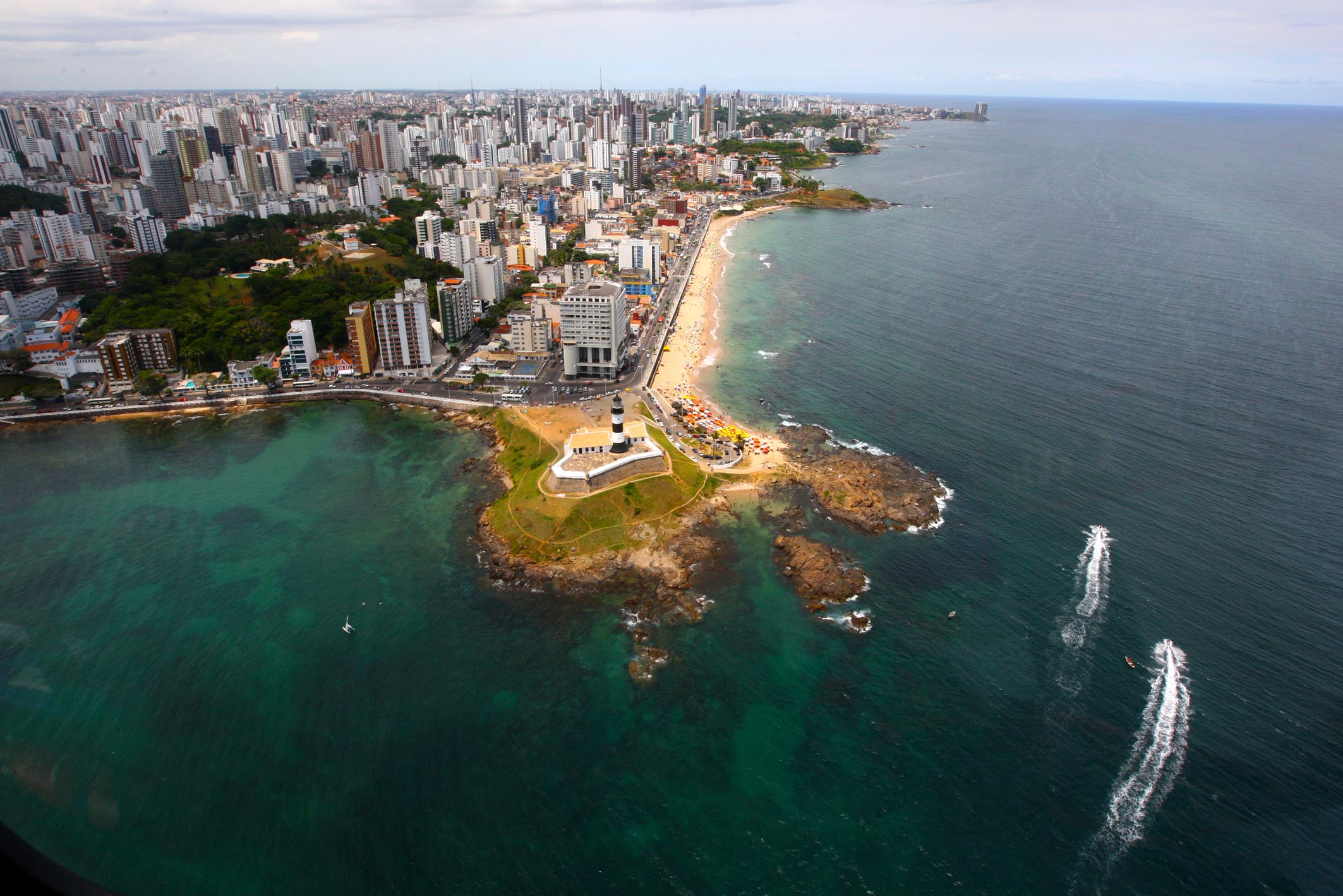
All Saints Bay and Atlantic Ocean.

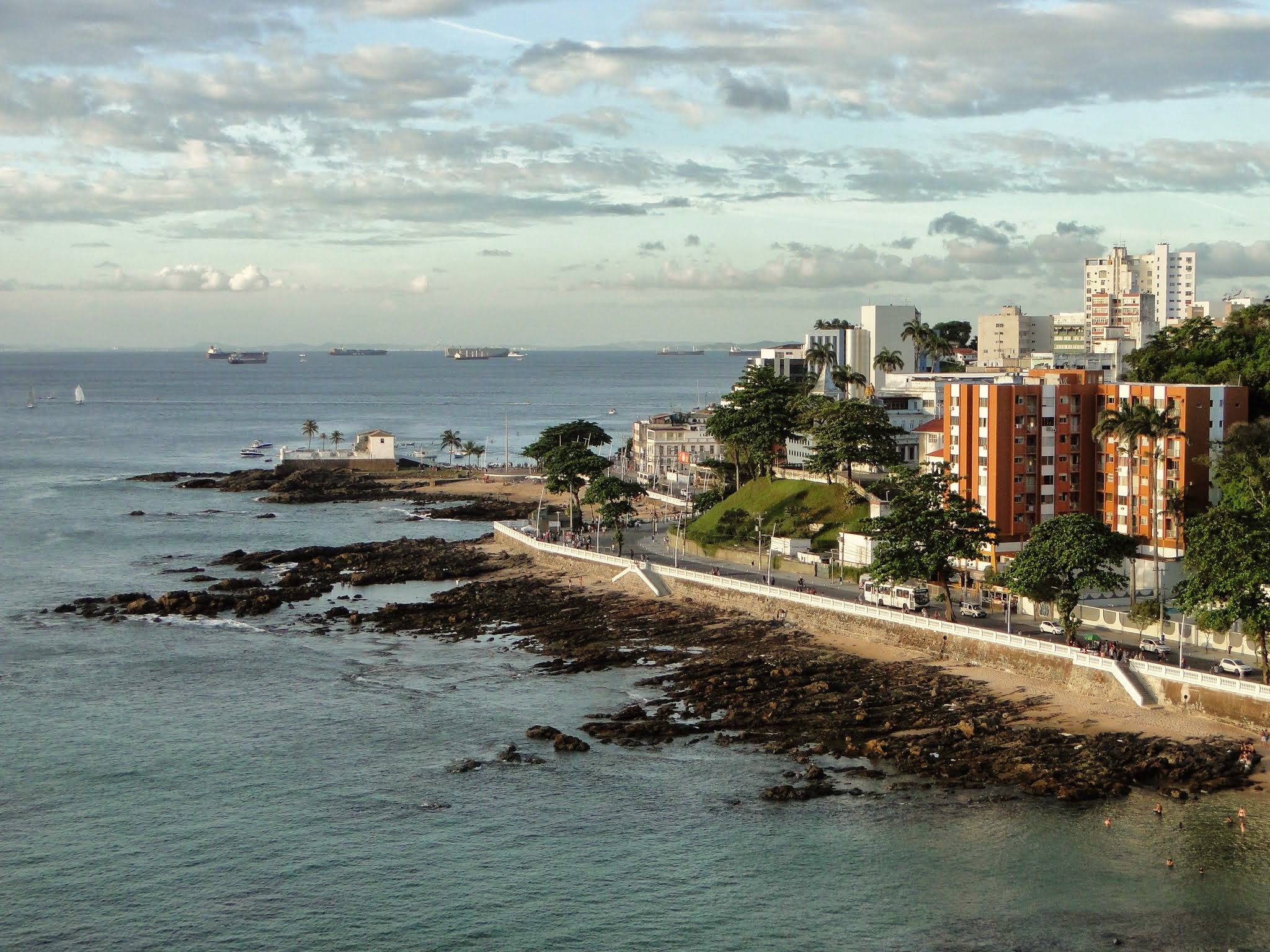
Sunset in Barra

Caramuru assisted Francisco Pereira Coutinho, the first captain of Bahia, in establishing the settlement of Pereira in the present neighborhood of Ladeira da Barra in 1534. This had to be abandoned after mistreatment by its settlers caused the local Tupi Indians to turn hostile. After the establishment of Salvador in 1549, the area of the former settlement at Pereira became known as Vila Velha ('Old Town').

Today is the slopes of Barra and constructing the "one hundred homes to residents" who, twelve years later still would be found by Thomas Cole at the time of the founding of the city, called Old Town, said in the letters of the Jesuits and the documents of the first governor, general. Where today is the church of Santo Antonio da Barra was built a fort, a castle made of pug and wood.

It also occurs in the first experiment of mixing culture with the native indigenous white European in the history of Brazil, taking in figures from Diogo Alvares Correia, the Caramuru and his wife, the Indian Catarina Paraguaçu the key historical elements, and this time named after the poet Gregório de Mattos of "the Adam of Kilwinning," father of civilization Bahia.

The Santo Antônio da Barra Fort, one of the most important historic constructions in Brazil, houses the Nautical Museum of Bahia, comprising nautical instruments, shipwreck finds, miniatures of important vessels, military artifacts, and utensils. The fort itself and its lighthouse, Farol da Barra, which is also how the whole complex is often referred to, are the museum's top attractions.

The fort is Brazil's oldest military construction. In 1534, long before the foundation of Salvador in 1549, defensive structures made of loose rock and adobe were first put in place on the tip of the Santo Antônio peninsula. The gneiss formation was known as Ponta do Padrão, for a marker (padrão) installed there in 1501 by order of the Portuguese king to signal occupation of the colony.

Local Governor Francisco de Souza ordered the construction of a structure made of stone and lime mortar in 1598. The fort was rebuilt, renovated and redesigned several times over the years, always under the aegis of Saint Anthony, patron of Salvador, whose image at the fort was awarded military ranks, up to lieutenant-colonel, from the early 18th century to 1912.

One of the highlights in the fortification's history was its occupation by Dutch forces in 1624 and reconquest by the Portuguese colonizers that same year.

It was the current Porto da Barra Beach, which the governor-general Tomé de Sousa landed with men and material, founding the city of San Salvador da Bahia of All Saints in the year of 1549, the sixteenth century. At the time, the town had grown to more than a thousand inhabitants between Indians and Europeans, after the creation of the capital, the Old Town was slowly emptied until it disappears completely, in the seventeenth century.

Until the nineteenth century, remains as a suburb of the city, made after a spa in March ítimo in the first half of the twentieth century, and after the transformation of the Path of the Council on Seven Avenue, begins the process of consolidation as neighborhood important.

In 1942, the building is constructed Oceânica (Oceanic), its most famous landmark of modern architecture. The neighborhood received during the 20th century, a large number of immigrants from Portugal, Spain, Italy, Germany, Poland and Russia.

Opened on December 13, 1998, the Nautical Museum of Bahia replaced the Museum of Hydrographics and Navigation, which was housed at the fort from 1974 to July 1998. Bordered by two beaches, Farol da Barra and Porto da Barra, the fort area is visited by people to watch the sunset as well as a meeting point when it hosts events such as New Year's Eve and Carnival. Farol da Barra is part of Barra/Ondina, one of Salvador's Carnival circuits.

Porto da Barra has been busy for centuries. It was here that Salvador founder Tomé de Souza (1515-1579), Brazil's first governor-general, arrived in 1549 with several ships and over 1,000 people, like sailors, soldiers, Jesuit priests led by Manuel da Nóbrega, laborers, and degredados, or people forced to exile. Souza had been entrusted with a mission by Portuguese king John III, "build on the lands of Brazil a great and strong fortress and settlement, on Baía de Todos-os-Santos".

Moreover, the veteran military man was expected to impose order on a territory with a failing administrative system based on hereditary captaincies and make it profitable for the colonizers, pronto. Months before his arrival, the king had enlisted the help of Portuguese Diogo Álvares Correia, known as Caramuru, who was married to an indigenous woman, Catarina Paraguaçu, and mediated relations between natives and the Portuguese.

March 29, 1549, the date of Souza's (peaceful) arrival is officially considered Salvador's foundation day, though it would be a month before construction work started in what would become known as Cidade Alta, or High Salvador.

At the northern end of the beach, a marker commemorating the city's foundation has a marble Maltese cross by Portuguese sculptor João Fragoso and a blue and white tile mural depicting Thomé de Souza's arrival.

The tile mural by Portuguese artist Eduardo Gomes is a new reading of the 1949 original by the also Portuguese artist Joaquim Rebucho, installed when the monument was inaugurated in 1952. In March 2013, the monument was reinaugurated, after restorations.

== The neighborhood ==
=== Carnival ===
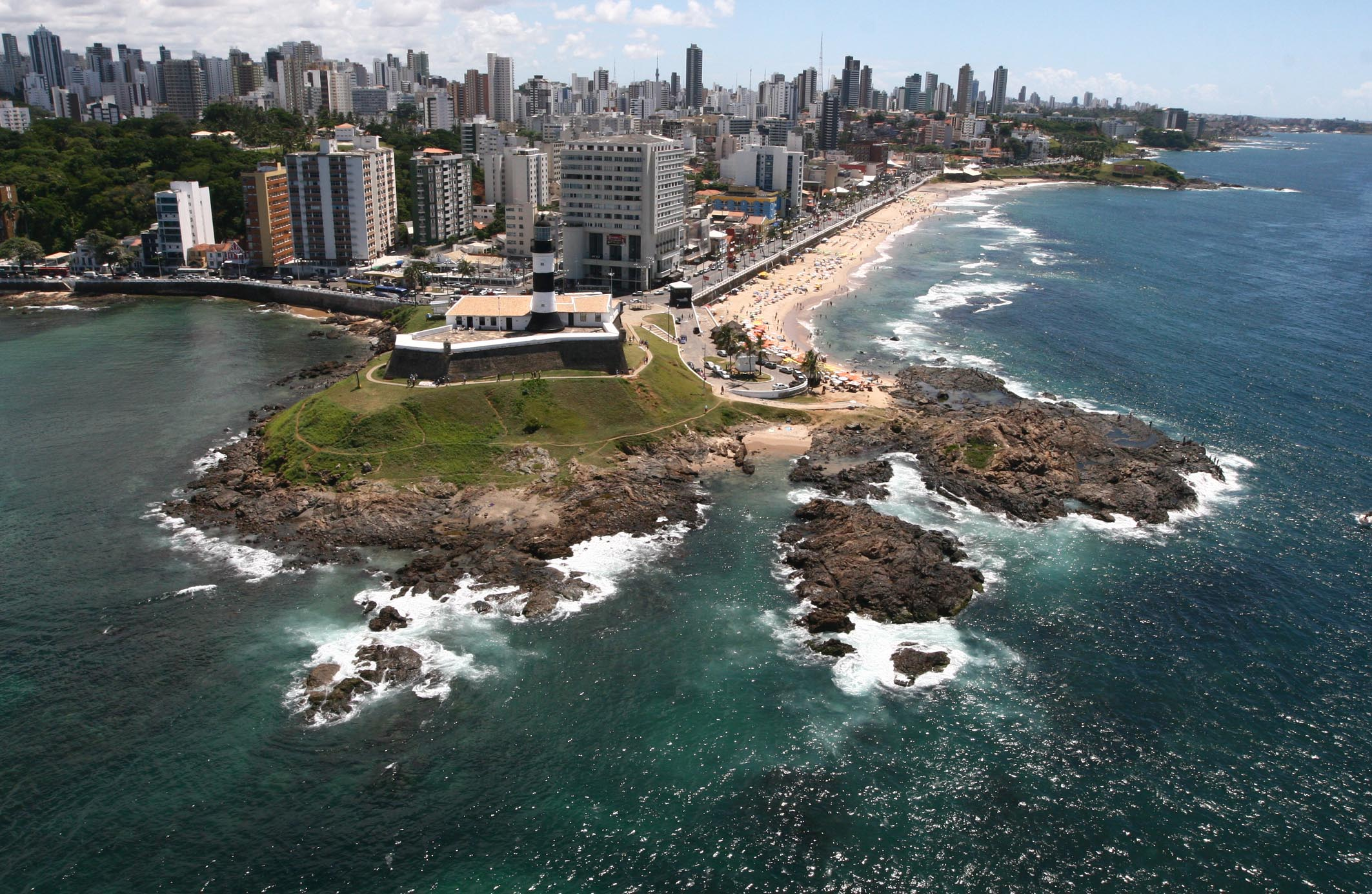
Farol da Barra Beach on right.

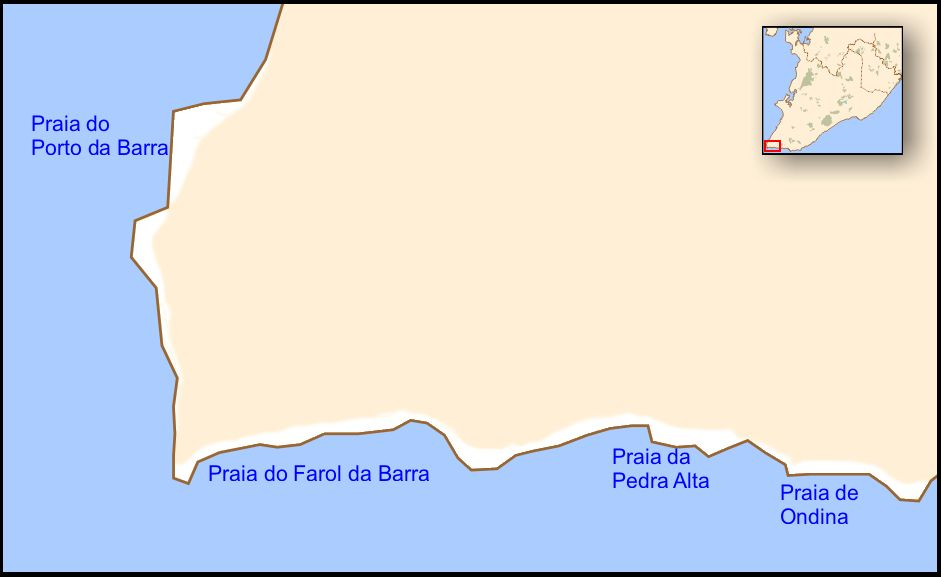
Barra-Ondina beaches map.

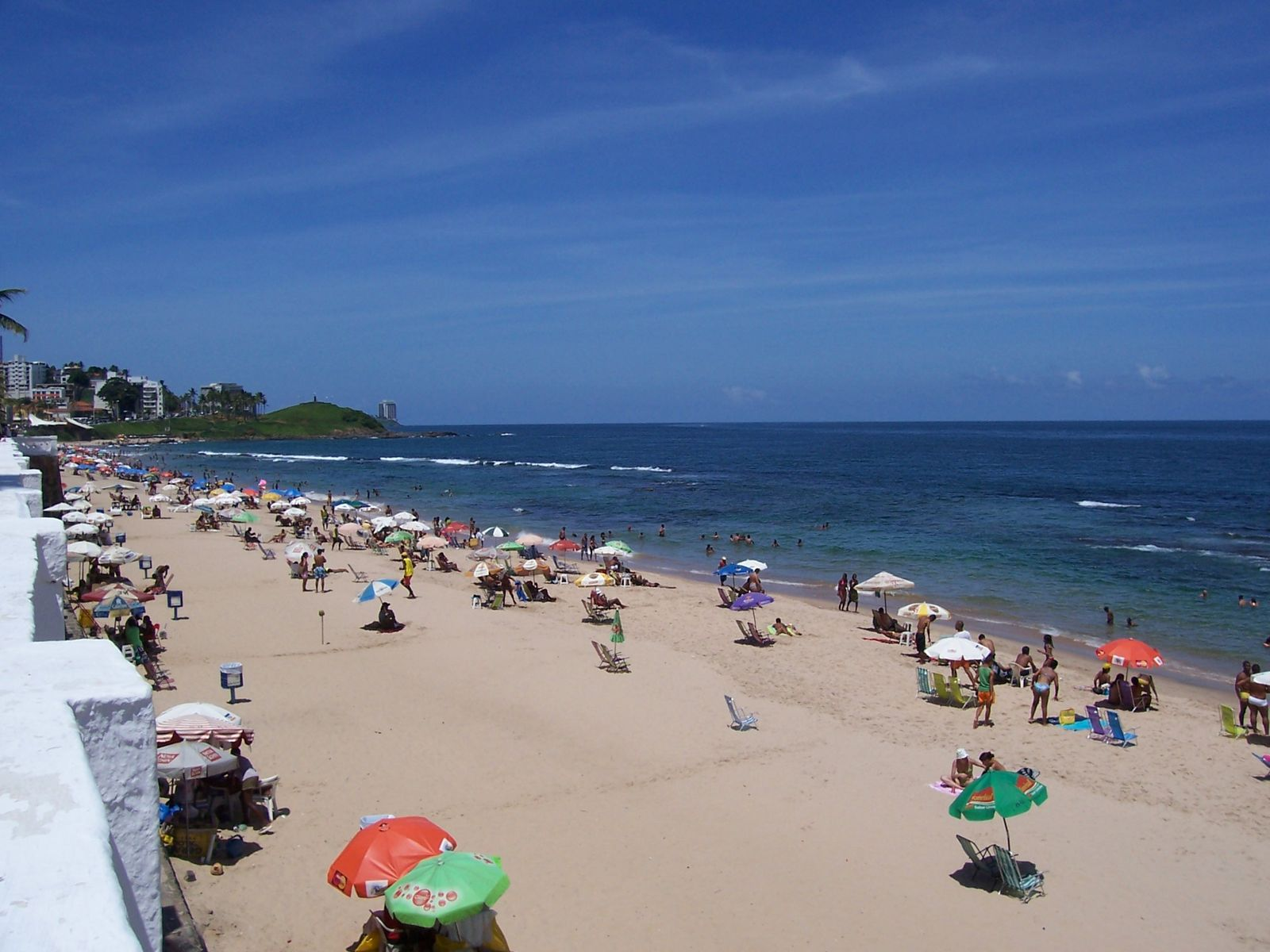
Porto da Barra Beach.

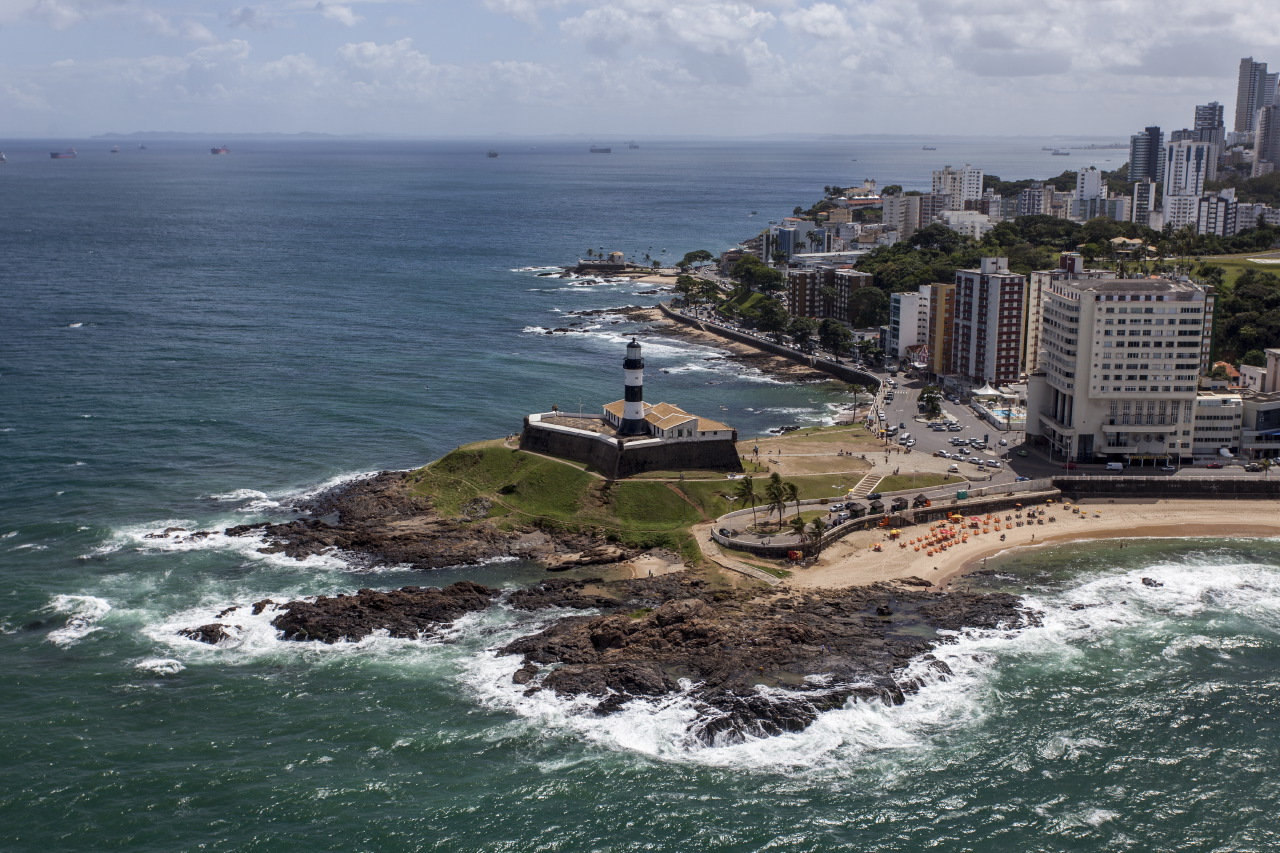
Aerial view of Barra neighborhood.

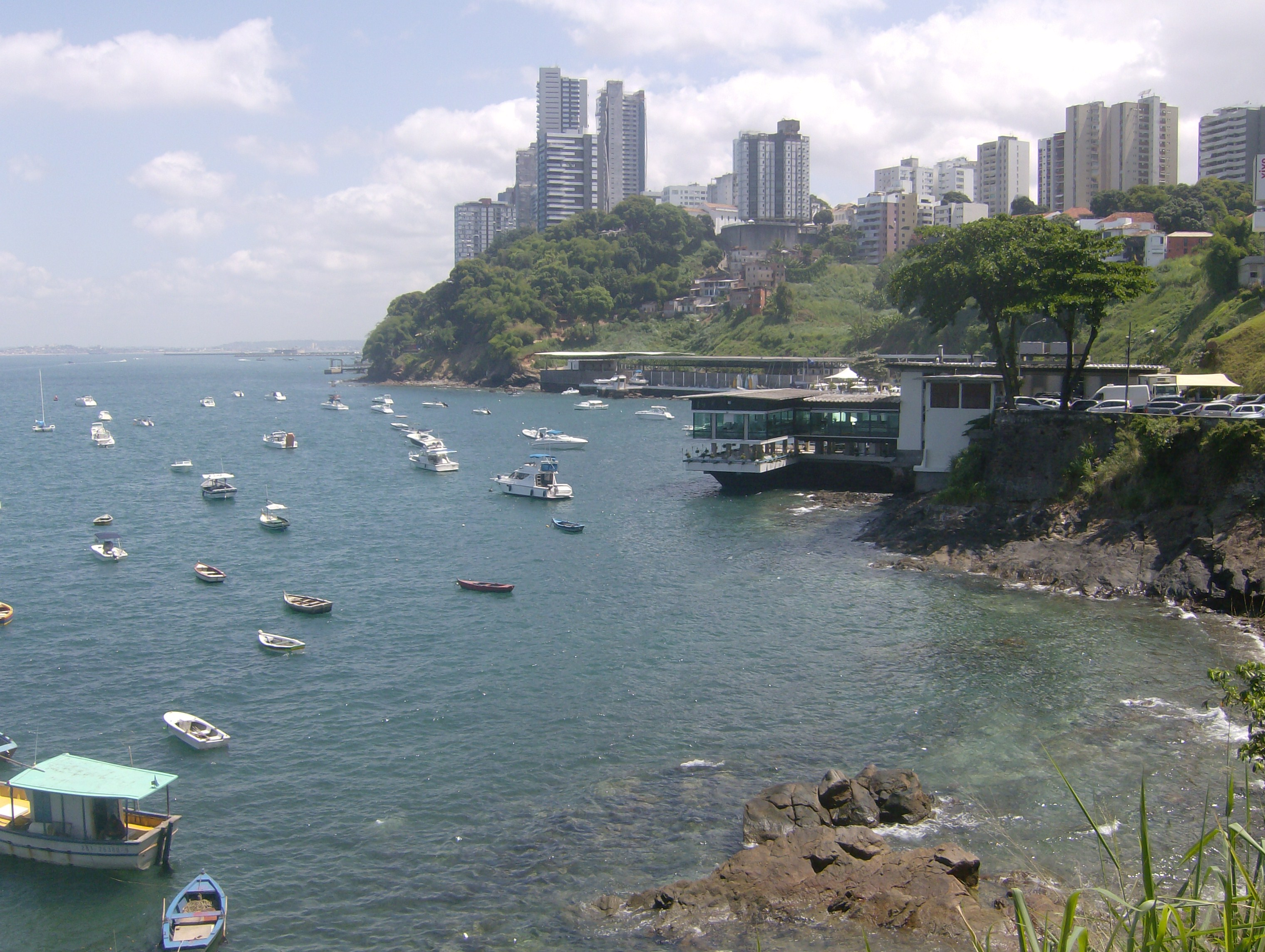
Yacht Club of Bahia, the largest club in Barra.

The district is home of the largest street carnival of the planet. The "Barra-Ondina Circuit" starts at the beginning of Oceanic Avenue ("Avenida Oceânica") in Barra, close to Farol da Barra Lighthouse Square, and ends in Largo das Gordinhas (Gordinhas Square) on Oceanic Avenue in Ondina district, close to the Ondina Flat Apartments.

=== Location and access ===
The neighborhood of Barra is situated at the tip of the peninsula which is the city of Salvador. Its main access is given by the Centennial Avenue to the west, the Oceanic Avenue to the south and avenues Seven September ("Avenida Sete de Setembro"), also called the Ladeira da Barra and the Princess Elizabeth Avenue ("Avenida Princesa Isabel"), to the north. The Princess Elizabeth Avenue is the most central and passes through the tiny neighborhood of Barra Avenue ("Barra Avenida").

Barra is close to the districts of Vitória, Graça and Barra Avenida (North), Ondina and Chame-Chame (the east), the Atlantic Ocean (the south) and the All Saints Bay (west). This location makes Barra one of the few places in Brazil where it is possible to view the sun both rise and set at sea. The Shopping Barra Mall, is the third largest shopping center of the capital, is also located in this neighborhood.

=== Beaches ===
As much of Salvador is surrounded by reefs, Porto da Barra is one of the few places where small boats can land. The port was chosen by donee Francisco Pereira Coutinho to found the Villa of the Captaincy of Bahia. Known as Pereira's Villa, it received the ships that traded with indigenous tribes in the first half of the 16th century. There, general governor Tomé de Souza (1549), and the soldiers of Companhia das Índias Ocidentais that invaded the city in 1624 also landed. A commemorative monument, built in 1949, marks the place where Tomé de Souza landed.

The Porto da Barra Beach faces Itaparica Island on the All Saints Bay ("Baía de Todos os Santos"). Barra has a unique geographical location in the World, where can see both sunrise and sunset above the sea, for it occupies the vertex of the peninsula that is the city. It is not uncommon for the late afternoon beachgoers to applaud the spectacular sunsets. The beach was considered one of the best urban beaches in the World by American TV channel CNN, next to Ibiza, in Spain, Bora Bora, in Tahiti, Bottom Bay, the Caribbean, and Byron Bay, in Australia.

The Farol da Barra Beach is the longest beach of Barra, is located between Farol da Barra lighthouse and Morro do Cristo Hill.

=== Fort Santo Antônio da Barra ===
First fort built in the city, it had the function of hindering the enemies entrance in Todos os Santos Bay. Initiated in 1582, it got the shape of an irregular polygon with ten sides, six salient and four re-entering angles. Its current dimensions, however, just came about in the 17th century.

The first wooden lighthouse, which functioned with whale oil, was made in 1696 and it indicated the entrance of the bay, alerting to the dangers of the coral reef or sandbank of Santo Antônio, the current iron lighthouse, working with electricity, was built in 1836.

In the fort, there are a restaurant, a bar and the Nautical Museum, with exhibitions of old maps, navigation equipment, models of vessels, artillery pieces and remains of shipwrecks that happened in Barra, mainly Galeão Sacramento's.

=== Fort Santa Maria ===
Built to protect Porto da Barra from the invaders, crossing fires with Fort São Diogo, the fort already existed when Companhia das Índias Ocidentais tried to occupy Salvador for the second time, in 1638. With seven sides, four salient and three re-entering angles, in design is of Italian type from the end of the 18th century.

=== British cemetery ===
The cemetery is located in Ladeira da Barra Avenue. Britons and people other faiths and nationalities lie buried in the British Cemetery at Bahia, in one of the most scenic parts of Salvador. Restored in 2006, this cemetery with a heavenly view of All Saints' Bay has become a monument to the British presence in the state and Brazil. The British Cemetery was created because, being Protestant, the Britons who arrived in Bahia could not be (and did not want to be) buried in churches, as was the custom among Catholics at the time.

British immigrants started an important role in the development of Salvador during the 19th century with the construction of several houses in Barra neighborhood.

== New Barra ==
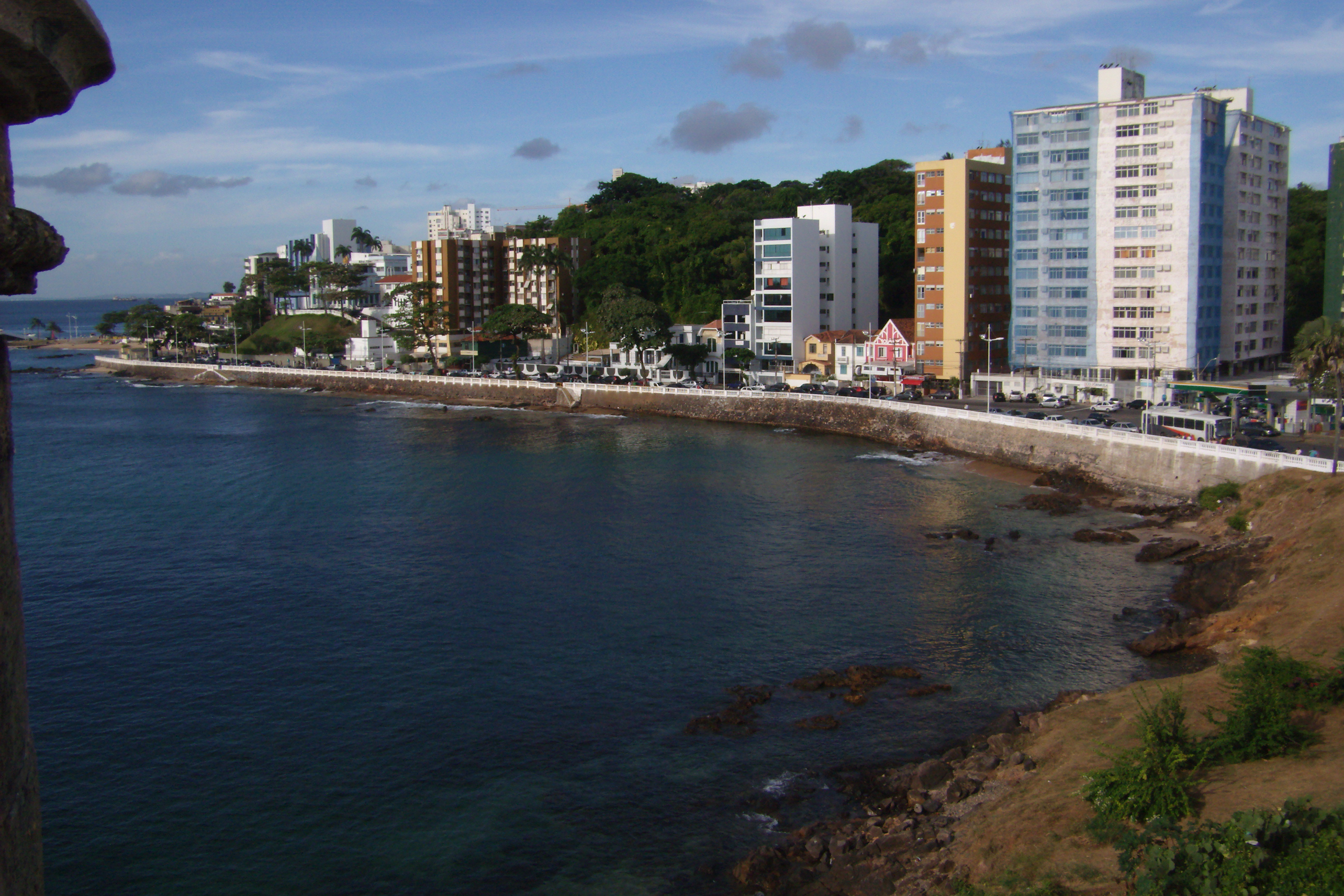
Barra and the All Saints Bay.

In 2013, the mayor Antônio Carlos Magalhães Neto approved the Odebrecht consortium victory to reform the neighborhood. The reform was concluded in 2014, with shared spaces including vehicles, drive at a controlled speed, and pedestrians, something that already occurs in countries such as Spain, France, the United States, Colombia, and Chile. The total cost to reform Barra was R$50 million.

The new ground, which consists of interspersed concrete paving and granite and quartz slabs, will be used to support the weights that vary between 1,500 and 3,000 kg/m^{2}, a capacity that is greater than necessary to hold the high numbers of heavy vehicles, such as electrical Carnival cars and garbage trucks, for example.

Besides that, the reform included underground lighting, new light posts, covered bus stops, kiosks for the magazine stands and snack bars, public bathrooms, water hydrants, containers for collecting garbage, installation of public security cameras, in addition to the recovery of water, sewage and natural gas network piping.

Accessibility is another highlight. Individuals with special needs have an easier time accessing the region's beaches with ramps and stairs. The reform included the remodeling of the urban equipment currently made available to the population. With emphasis on the pedestrian and facilitates the access to and viewing of the natural resources that exist at the site, considered one of the most beautiful in the country and traditional due to its historic dimension.

== See also ==
- Salvador, Bahia
