= Tcheca =

2017 song by Danny Bond

Song by Danny Bond

from the album Epica
- Released: 22 December 2017
- Genre: Brega funk
- Length: 2:58
- Label: Independent, ONErpm
- Songwriter: Danny Bond
- Producer: DJ Fabregas

Music video
- "Tcheca" on YouTube

"Tcheca" is a song by Brazilian rapper and singer Danny Bond. It was released on 22 December 2017 independently through ONErpm as part of her first studio album, Epica (2017). The track was written by Bond and produced by DJ Fabregas. In 2020, the song gained national recognition through a mashup combining it with "Say So" by American rapper Doja Cat, produced by Satan, a friend of Danny.

The song's popularity later led to its selection as the theme for a digital bank campaign by WillBank, starring Danny herself, making her the first trans woman in Brazil to headline a banking campaign.

On her third album, Epica 2, released on 29 August 2024, a remix of "Tcheca" produced by DJ Ramemes was included.

== Mashup ==
In August 2020, producer Satan, who had previously created official remixes for Danny, released a mashup of "Tcheca" with "Say So" by Doja Cat. The version went viral on TikTok, earning national recognition for the Alagoas-born artist. The remix was made without Doja Cat's prior authorization; she became aware of it but decided not to take it down due to its widespread success.

=== Live performance ===
When Doja Cat was confirmed for Lollapalooza Brazil 2021, Danny Bond's fans eagerly anticipated a live performance of the mashup, even though Danny had not been officially confirmed for the festival. The potential collaboration became one of the most talked-about topics on social media.

The dating app Tinder, for which both artists serve as ambassadors, attempted to arrange a meeting. One proposal involved displaying the Tinder logo on the festival's big screen to "match" the two artists before Danny joined Doja on stage, but the plan's 1 million reais cost led Danny to decline. Another proposal was for a joint performance in Rio de Janeiro followed by São Paulo after the festival, but the dates could not be confirmed due to Doja Cat's departure from Brazil.
