= Thiago Pantaleão =

Brazilian singer, songwriter, and dancer

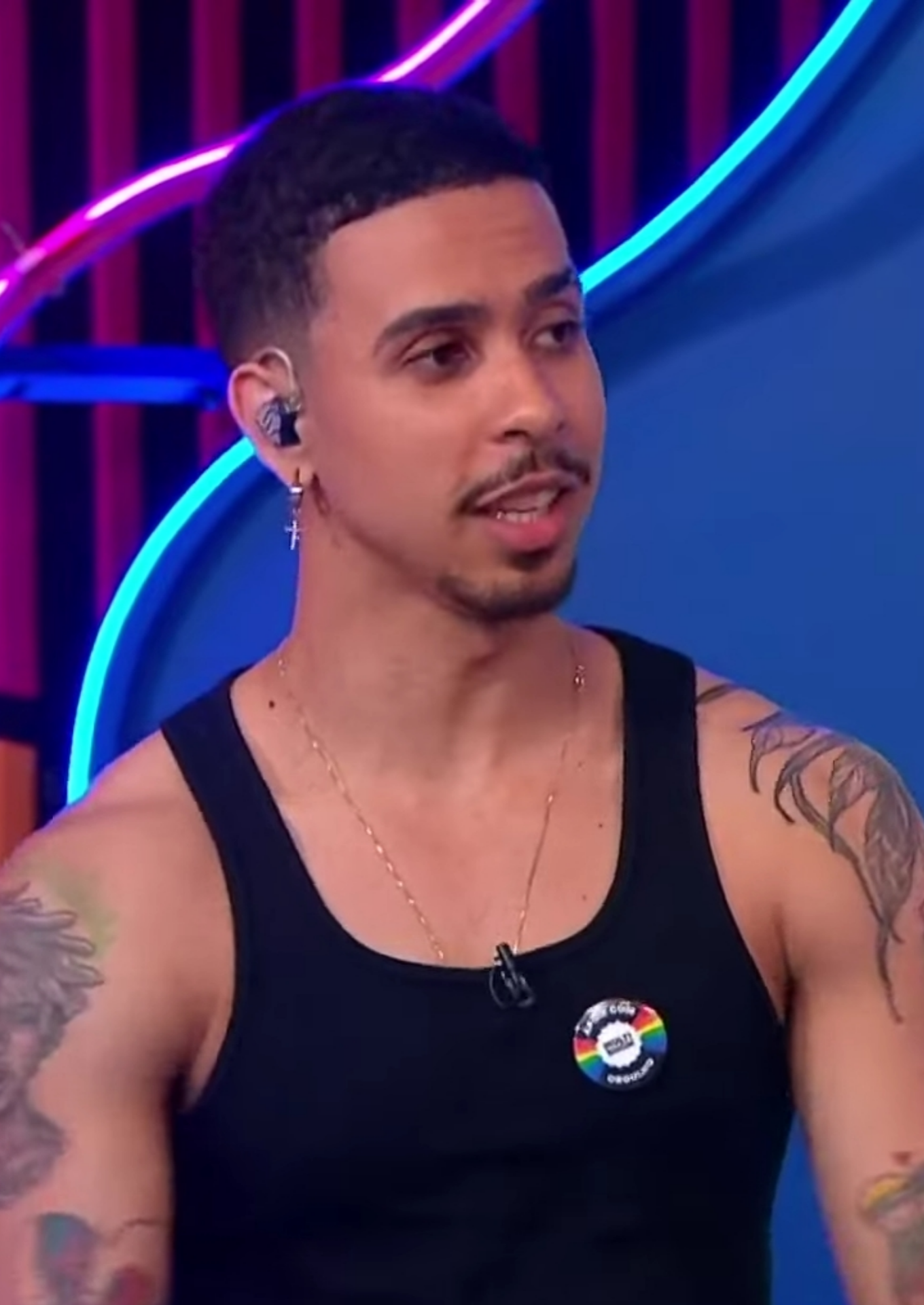
- Pantaleão in 2023

Background information
- Born: Thiago Caitano Romeiro Pantaleão; September 5, 1997 (age 29); Vassouras, Rio de Janeiro, Brazil
- Origin: Paracambi, Rio de Janeiro, Brazil
- Genres: R&B; pop; funk
- Occupations: Singer; songwriter; dancer
- Years active: 2020–present
- Label: Som Livre

Thiago Caitano Romeiro Pantaleão (born September 5, 1997) is a Brazilian singer, songwriter, and dancer. His music blends R&B, pop, and funk carioca with lyrics addressing themes of self-acceptance, identity, and social issues including LGBTQ+ rights and anti-racism.

Pantaleão gained attention through social media, particularly after his 2020 single "Tipo Iza" received support from established Brazilian artists including Iza and Liniker. In 2021, he collaborated with Danny Bond on the single "Te Deixo Crazy." In 2022, he signed with Som Livre and released his debut album Fim do Mundo, followed by the EP Nova Era Part. I in 2023 and the album Nova Era in 2024.

== Early life ==
Thiago Caitano Romeiro Pantaleão was born on September 5, 1997, in Vassouras, Rio de Janeiro, and raised in the Jardim Nova Era neighborhood of Paracambi in the state's metropolitan region. He is the son of Bianca Pantaleão, a housekeeper and artisan, and a father who worked as a truck driver and church musician.

Pantaleão's musical upbringing began in his family's evangelical church, where his mother served as a vocalist and his father as a musician. He has described his mother as his first "gospel diva," recalling how he would accompany her singing on stage from an early age. During adolescence, Pantaleão identified as LGBTQ+ but faced significant social challenges, including losing most of his friendships when he came out. Although he did not experience direct conflict with his church over his sexual orientation, his personal acceptance proved difficult due to his conservative upbringing, and he eventually chose to leave the church to live openly.

== Career ==
=== 2020–2022: Career beginnings and Fim do Mundo ===
In 2020, Pantaleão launched his music career by releasing three singles, including "Tipo Iza," which drew attention from established Brazilian artists Liniker and Iza, who is referenced in the song's title. Via Twitter, Iza shared words of encouragement and promoted his music video, while Liniker praised his musical style, harmony, and vocal ability.

In 2021, Pantaleão collaborated with Danny Bond on the single "Te Deixo Crazy." The song accumulated over 3 million streams across YouTube and Spotify within six months of its release.

In early 2022, Pantaleão gained viral attention after sharing photos wearing a crocheted bikini made by his mother, inspired by a design worn by Jade Picon on Big Brother Brasil 22. The moment led to an invitation to the Vogue Ball at Copacabana Palace.

On June 16, 2022, Pantaleão signed with Som Livre record label, with artistic direction by Pablo Bispo, musical production by Ruxell and Gondim, and management by Liga Entretenimento. He subsequently released the single "Desculpa por Eu Não Te Amar."

In September 2022, Pantaleão released his debut studio album Fim do Mundo, a nine-track project blending pop and rock with influences from superheroes, anime, and K-pop. He also performed his first major television appearance on Música Boa Ao Vivo on Multishow, sharing the stage with Gloria Groove, Priscilla, and Grag Queen. He also performed at Rock in Rio for the first time that year.

=== 2023–2024: Nova Era and international recognition ===
In April 2023, Pantaleão released "Mente Pra Mim," accompanied by a music video set on a basketball court featuring queer-coded imagery and choreography with his backup dancers. That same year, he appeared on "Sócia," a single alongside Aretuza Lovi and Lia Clark. In September 2023, he collaborated with Lexa on the funk carioca single "Rabisca," produced by Ruxell and filmed in a park in the northern zone of Rio de Janeiro.

In November 2023, Pantaleão released the EP Nova Era Part. I, featuring five tracks, four of which were previously unreleased. The project served as the first installment of a larger artistic concept examining his past to understand his identity as an artist. The title Nova Era references both the Jardim Nova Era neighborhood where he grew up and his artistic evolution.

On August 16, 2024, Pantaleão released the complete album Nova Era, featuring 11 tracks total. Collaborators include Karol Conká on "Sai da Frente," Luiz Lins on "Mano que Viagem," and N.I.N.A. The album draws sonically and aesthetically from Brazil's 1990s and 2000s, incorporating elements of R&B, funk carioca, and pop rooted in his suburban Rio de Janeiro upbringing. Pantaleão returned to Rock in Rio in 2024, performing at the Espaço Favela stage on September 14 with a 17-song setlist.

In September 2024, ahead of the blocking of Twitter in Brazil, Pantaleão posted a twerking video as his final post on X/Twitter. The video attracted attention from international artists including Lil Nas X and accumulated over one million views. In an interview with Out, Pantaleão described the platform as his most personal social network and expressed sadness over its blocking. By that point, he had accumulated approximately 1.3 million followers on TikTok, 859,000 on Instagram, and over 26.4 million views on his YouTube channel.

=== 2025: We4Sessions and continued singles ===
In March 2025, Pantaleão participated in the live session project We4Sessions, performing six songs including "Malícia," "Tipo Iza," and "Joga na Minha Cara." The session was filmed at Grape Sound Lab and released on YouTube on March 11, with audio released to streaming platforms on March 20. In September, he released "Mesmo Lugar," a collaboration with Nigerian-born producer and bassist Simbiat Ebhohon, described as a return to the R&B and new soul influences central to his earlier work. He subsequently released the single "Ainda Não Te Amo" in October.

== Artistry ==
Pantaleão's musical style incorporates R&B, pop, and funk carioca, blending modern production with Brazilian rhythms drawn from the suburban Rio de Janeiro culture of the 1990s and 2000s. The Nova Era project explores themes of religious conflict, sexual identity, and suburban life, using visual elements from sacred art and Brazilian family traditions.

His musical influences include Rihanna, Beyoncé, Mariah Carey, and Lil Nas X, as well as Brazilian artists Gloria Groove, Liniker, Luedji Luna, and Ludmilla.

== Personal life ==
In a 2023 interview with UOL, Pantaleão publicly identified as bisexual, stating an attraction to people of multiple genders. Since 2023, he has been in a relationship with Miran, one of his dancers and choreographers, which he has described as an open relationship.

Pantaleão has spoken openly about creating an OnlyFans account, describing the experience in an interview with Quem as having significantly boosted his self-confidence. He recounted that insecurity about his physical appearance during childhood led him to begin weightlifting in adolescence, and that the positive response he received on the platform helped him feel more confident in his appearance. He also noted that the financial returns allowed him to support his mother.

== Discography ==
=== Studio albums ===
| Title | Year | Details |
|---|---|---|
| Fim do Mundo | 2022 | Released: September 2022; Label: Som Livre |
| Nova Era | 2024 | Released: August 16, 2024; Label: Som Livre |

=== Extended plays ===
| Title | Year |
|---|---|
| Nova Era Part. I | 2023 |
| We4Sessions | 2025 |

=== Selected singles ===
| Title | Year | Notes |
|---|---|---|
| "Tipo Iza" | 2020 | |
| "Te Deixo Crazy" | 2021 | featuring Danny Bond |
| "Desculpa por Eu Não Te Amar" | 2022 | |
| "Mente Pra Mim" | 2023 | |
| "Rabisca" | 2023 | with Lexa |
| "Malícia" | 2023 | |
| "Sócia" | 2023 | Aretuza Lovi featuring Thiago Pantaleão and Lia Clark |
| "Sai da Frente" | 2024 | featuring Karol Conká |
| "Na Batucada" | 2024 | |
| "Mesmo Lugar" | 2025 | with Simbiat Ebhohon |
| "relações superficiais" | 2025 | with Bruno Gadiol |
| "Ainda Não Te Amo" | 2025 | |

== Awards and nominations ==
| Year | Award | Category | Nominated work | Result | Ref. |
|---|---|---|---|---|---|
| 2021 | BreakTudo Awards | National Collaboration | "Te Deixo Crazy" (with Danny Bond) | Nominated | |
| 2022 | BreakTudo Awards | National Breakthrough Artist | Thiago Pantaleão | Nominated | |
| 2022 | Prêmio Potências | Experimente / Breakthrough / New Artist of the Year | Thiago Pantaleão | Won | |
| 2023 | Prêmio Multishow | Breakthrough Artist | Thiago Pantaleão | Nominated | |
| 2023 | Prêmio Biscoito | Breakthrough of the Valley | Thiago Pantaleão | Nominated | |
| 2023 | Prêmio Biscoito | Choreography of the Valley | "Fim do Mundo" | Nominated | |
| 2023 | Prêmio Biscoito | Collaboration of the Year | "Sócia" (Aretuza Lovi feat. Thiago Pantaleão & Lia Clark) | Nominated | |
| 2023 | Prêmio Biscoito | Hit of the Valley | "Desculpa por Eu Não Te Amar" | Nominated | |
| 2023 | Prêmio Biscoito | Album of the Valley | Fim do Mundo | Nominated | |
