= Priscila Senna =

Brazilian singer (born 1990)

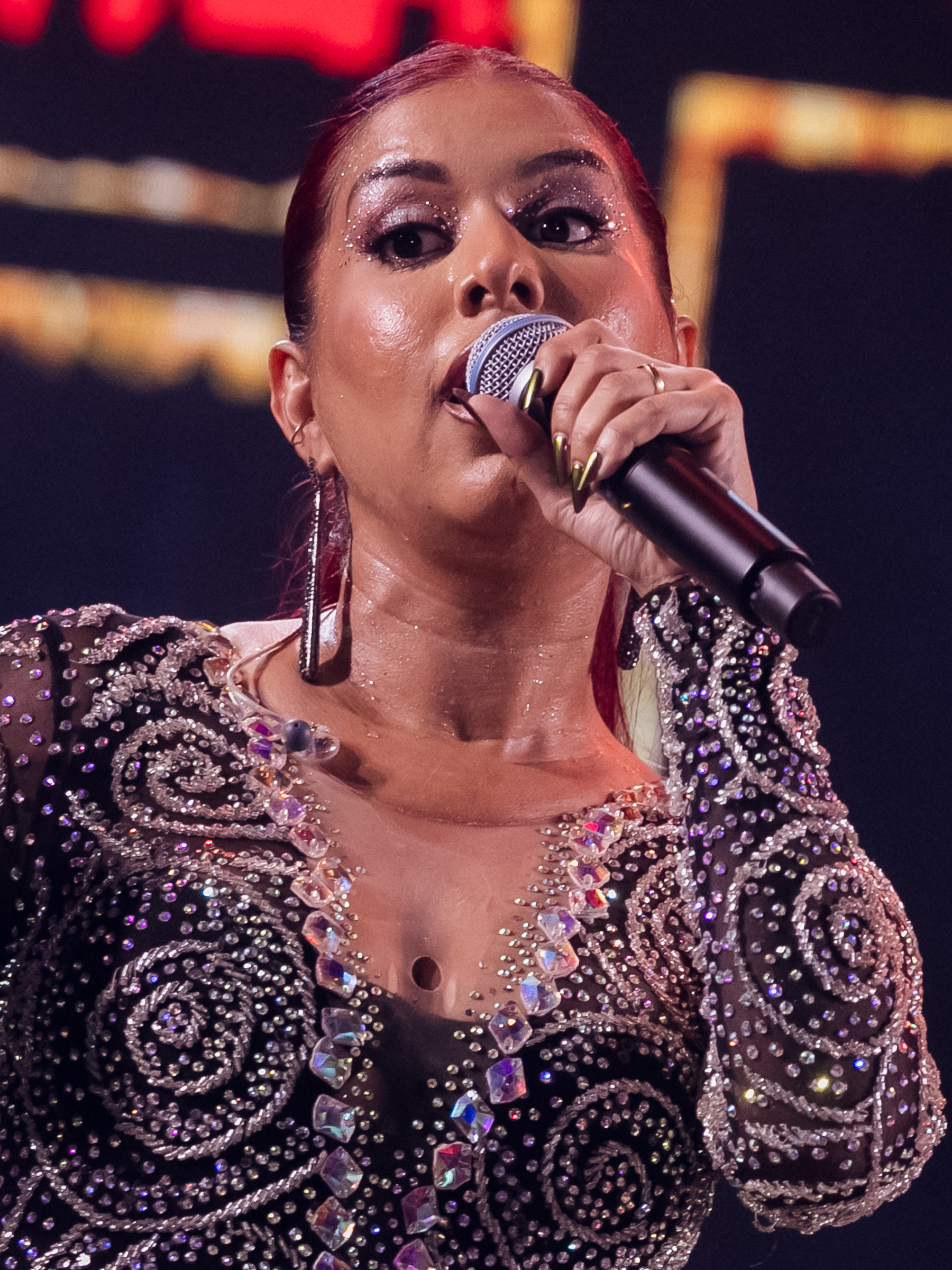
- Priscila Senna in 2022

Background information
- Born: November 13, 1990; Olinda, PE
- Genres: brega, música sertaneja
- Occupations: Singer and songwriter
- Instrument: Vocals
- Years active: 2007 – present

Priscila Senna (born November 13, 1990), known as simply Priscila, is a Brazilian singer and songwriter of the brega and música sertaneja genres.

== Music career ==
At Carnival 2020, the singer gathered 400 thousand people in her show at Galo da Madrugada at Marco Zero in the city of Recife in Brazil. Among her biggest hits are the songs "Meu Novo Namorado", "Sorte", "Mexeu Comigo" with Márcia Felilpe, "Cachorro Combina com Cadela" with Naiara Azevedo, "Rei das Mentiras".

Her main influences are Walkyria Santos, Magníficas, Silvania da Calcinha Preta, Angela Espíndola do Limão com Mel and Joelma, former member of Calypso.

Currently, her career is managed by A3 Entertainment.

== Biography ==
She was born in Olinda, Pernambuco and had her first contact with music through her uncle who was a dancer in a Brega band. At the age of 11, she was taken to audition as a backing vocal in the extinct Brega sensation band where she later became a vocalist. At the age of 16, she started gaining space in the media as lead singer of the band Mysstura do Calypso, where he sang until 2008 and recorded hits like "Novo Namorado" signed by Elvis Pires and later re-recorded by several bands at national level such as Calcinha Preta and Aviões do Forró and "Ferida". In 2009, Priscila and Elvis started the band Musa do Calypso with the song "Mais Que Amizade".

== Discography ==
=== Studio albums ===
- A Musa, Volume 1 (2012)
- Volume 2, CD (2014)
- Amor de Fã, DVD (2015)
- Priscila Senna A Musa, EP (2019)
- Priscila Senna 10 Anos: Ao Vivo em Recife, DVD (2019)
- Reviravolta, EP (2020)

=== Singles ===
- Cachorro Combina Com Cadela (com Naiara Azevedo) (2018)
- Priscila Senna A Musa (2012)
- Novo Namorado (com Márcia Fellipe) (2019)
- Sorte (com Márcia Fellipe) (2019)
- Mexeu Comigo (com Márcia Fellipe) (2019)
