= MC Cabelinho =

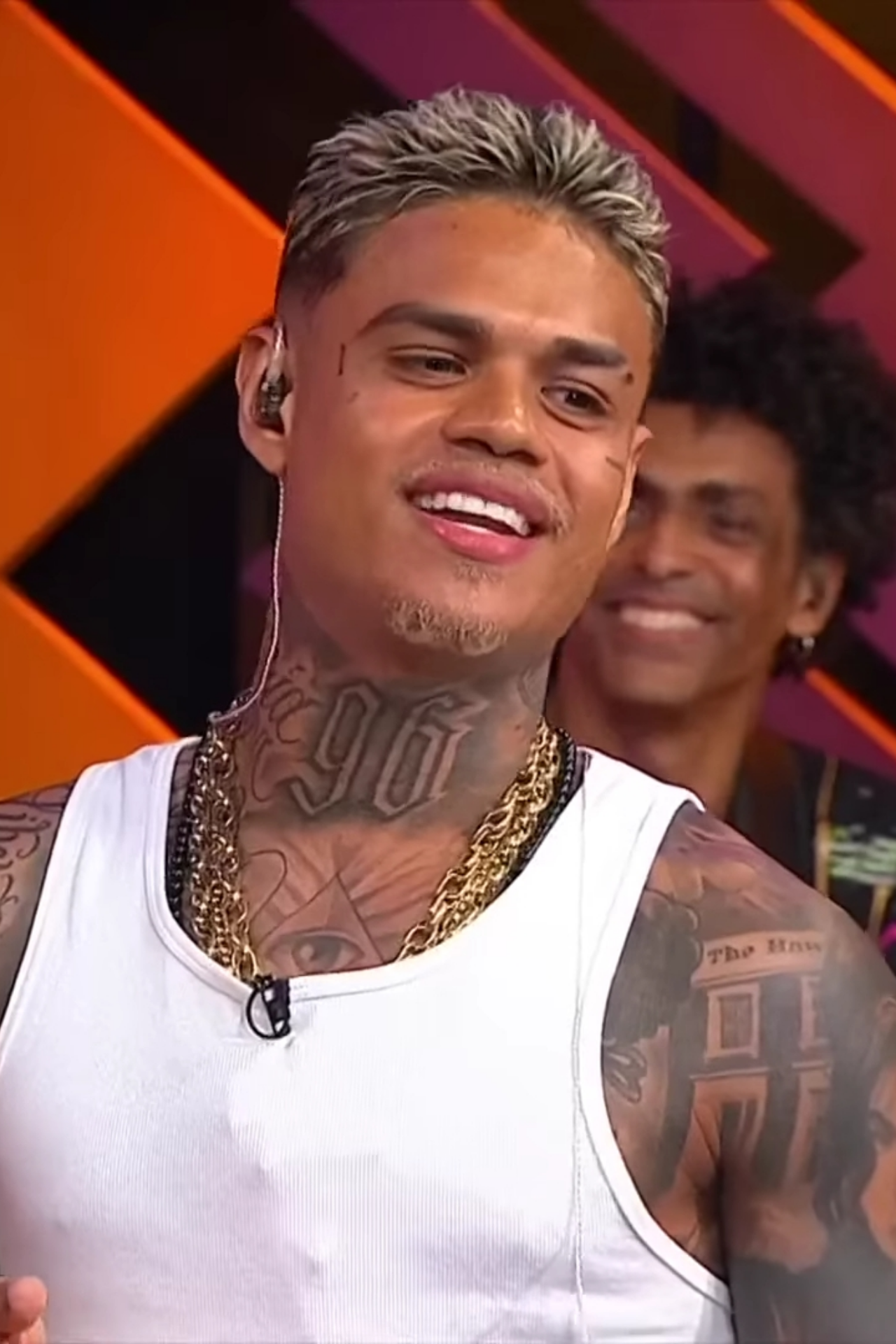
- MC Cabelinho in May 2023

Background information
- Born: Victor Hugo Oliveira do Nascimento; 26 January 1996 (age 30); Cantagalo-Pavão-Pavãozinho, Rio de Janeiro , Brazil
- Occupations: Rapper; singer; songwriter
- Years active: 2016–present
- Label: Bairro 13 Independente KondZilla

Victor Hugo Oliveira do Nascimento (born 28 January 1996), known as MC Cabelinho, is a Brazilian singer, composer, and actor. He began his music career in 2016 with singles like "16 Tá Aí" and "Voz do Coração." In 2019, he made his acting debut portraying Farula in the telenovela "Amor de Mãe.

== Biography ==
Victor Hugo Oliveira do Nascimento, was born on January 28, 1996. He was raised in the Pavão-Pavãozinho-Cantagalo favela in Copacabana, a neighborhood in the southern region of the city of Rio de Janeiro.

He has worked as a stocker in a shopping mall, assembled blinds, helped one uncle clean a car workshop, and another uncle sell gift wrap during the holiday season in Copacabana. He sang at church and worked wherever he could, as he needed to make money to help his family He didn't do very well in school, stopping his studies in the first year of high school. He plans to return soon and pursue a degree in Literature or Music.

He received the nickname 'Cabelinho' at the age of 15, when he started singing, because he always wore his hair spiked and bleached.

== Career ==
2016–2019: Early Music Career and Amor de Mãe

Victor Hugo Oliveira do Nascimento started his career in 2016. He became Cabelinho at the age of 15, when he began singing.

In 2016, he released the original singles '16 Tá Aí' and “Voice from the heart In 2017 he released the singles “Toda hora” e “Zona sul” Here is the translation In 2018, he released his first album 'Minha Raiz,' which featured collaborations with MC Orelha on the title track, DJ Mibi on 'Fé pra Tudo, Moço,' Batutinha on 'Zona Sul,' among others."

In 2019, he made his acting debut in the telenovela Amor de Mãe, broadcast by TV Globo, playing the character Diogo Barreto, the MC Farula." In the same year, he recorded the single 'Até o Céu' with singer Anitta, a song he co-wrote with Anitta herself, Pablo Bispo, Ruxell, and Sergio Santos. In 2020, he released the album 'Ainda,' with 13 original tracks.

2021–Present: Little Hair and Little Love

In 2021, he released the album 'Little Hair,' with 17 tracks and collaborations from Orochi and Dallass on 'Cabaré,' L7nnon, Filipe Ret, and Dallass on 'Eu Sou o Trem,' among other guests." In the same year, he released the EP 'Coro com Coça,' with five original tracks and features from Kevin O Chris on the title track, MC Dricka on 'Já Era Tarde,' among others.

In 2022, he released the album 'Little Love,' with 13 original tracks and special features from Bairro 13 on 'Valho Nada,' Baco Exu do Blues and Delacruz on 'Intenção,' Ludmilla on 'Tanto Faz,' and Gloria Groove on 'Nossa Música.' 'Little Love' had 11 out of the 13 tracks reach the Top 50 Brazil on Spotify, and the release was considered the sixth biggest overall debut of an album on the platform in the country, as well as the best debut for a rap album in Spotify Brazil history, with 5.4 million streams. In 2022, he founded his own record label, Bairro 13. Also in 2022, he was nominated for the MTV Millennial Awards and won the Beat BR

== Musical characteristics ==
Musical Style and Voice

Cabelinho's musical genre is primarily classified as trap. He stands out for blending rap and funk in his songs, two genres originating from the outskirts. While raising awareness in his lyrics, he also advocates for the release of lighter songs. MC has also explored other genres such as R&B, drill, and pagode. When he's in the creative process, he creates several songs. Often, he composes melodies on the spot and then writes the lyrics. He used to sing in church, so he has an understanding of tone.

== Influences ==
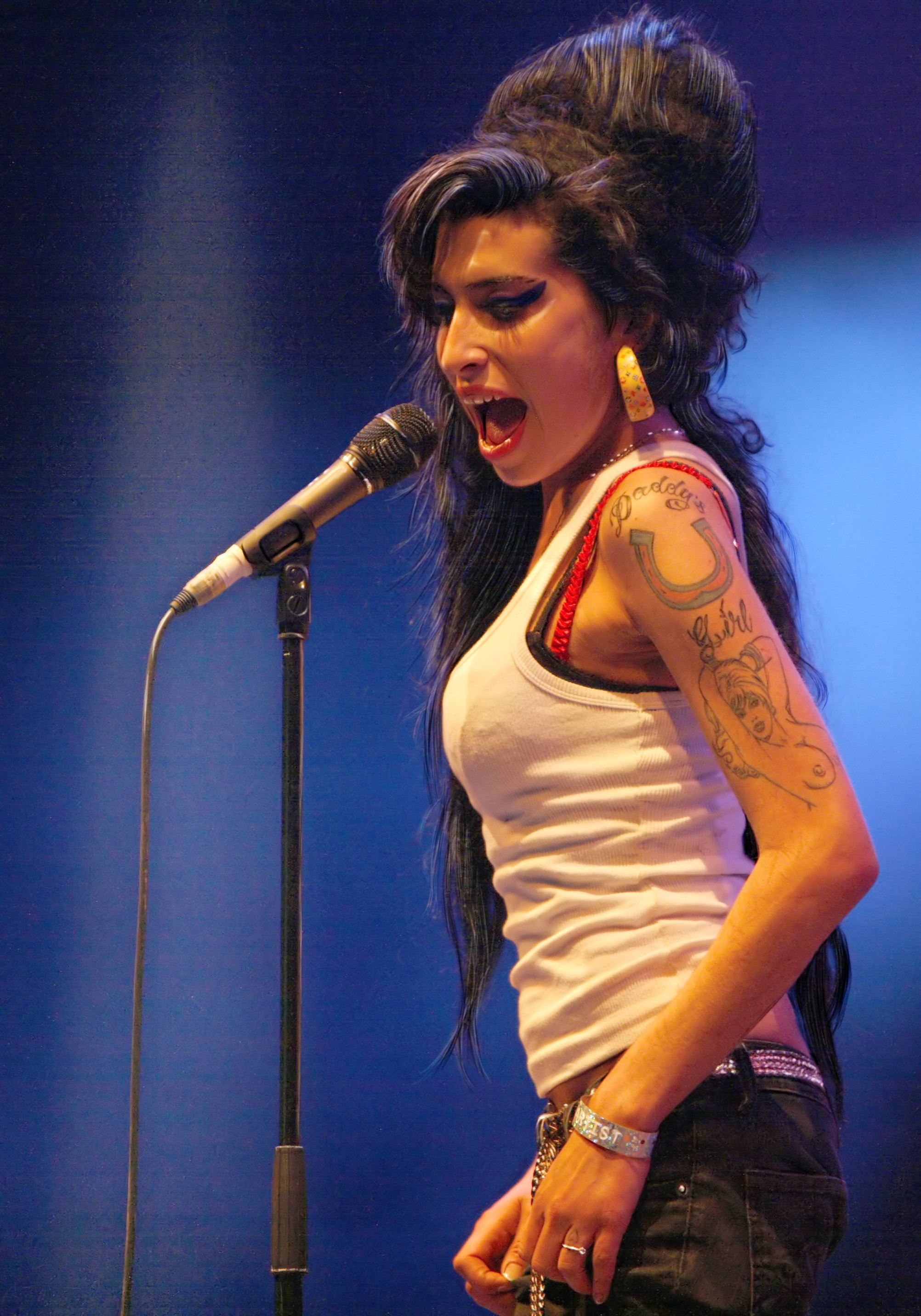
The singer Amy Winehouse is considered Cabelinho's greatest influence.

Cabelinho's main artistic inspiration is the English singer Amy Winehouse. Cabelinho has a tattoo of Winehouse as an adult on his left forearm, and another of Winehouse at the age of five. Just below his left ear, the word 'Amy' is tattooed.

Besides Amy Winehouse, Cabelinho admires major trap stars like Travis Scott, Quavo, and Post Malone. He also admires the funk artist MC Orelha, who he always listened to on his way to school. He started rapping because he really wanted to be like the old MCs, such as Orelha, Tikão, Frank, and Smith.

== Personal life ==
MC Cabelinho and actress Bella Campos, with whom he stars in the telenovela Vai na Fé, have been in a relationship since October 2022. On August 29, 2023, Bella announced the end of the relationship, after rumors of infidelity on the part of the singer. 'Until now, I was waiting for a public statement from MC Cabelinho regarding the rumors of infidelity, but men, in general, are exempt from this questioning, and we women always have to explain ourselves: whether we are getting married, having children, or separating... So here we go: since we didn't have a message from him about what happened, I'm confirming here that we are no longer together because of the obvious reasons,' she wrote.

MC Cabelinho practices jiu-jitsu and is currently a white belt. He has even organized a jiu-jitsu event for athletes from the communities of Rio de Janeiro. His song 'Ringue da Vida' features several references to jiu-jitsu, both in the lyrics and the music video. The artist is a follower of Candomblé.

== Discography ==
- Minha Raiz (2018)
- Ainda (2020)
- LITTLE HAIR (2021)
- LITTLE LOVE (2022)
- LITTLE LOVE (DELUXE) (2023)
- Não Sou Santo Mas Não Sou Bandido (2024)

EPs

- Coro com Coça (2021)

== Filmography ==
=== Television ===
Year	Title	Role	Notes
2019–21	Amor de Mãe	Diogo Barreto (Farula/MC Farula)	
2022	Dates, Likes & Ladrilhos	Otávio	
2023	Vai na Fé	Hugo de Oliveira	
2023	The Others	Himself	
2024	Today is Children's Day	Himself	

=== Film ===
Year	Title	Role	Ref.
2025	Confia: Sonho de Cria	Nando	
