= Ondina, Salvador =

- Neighborhood
- Country: Brazil

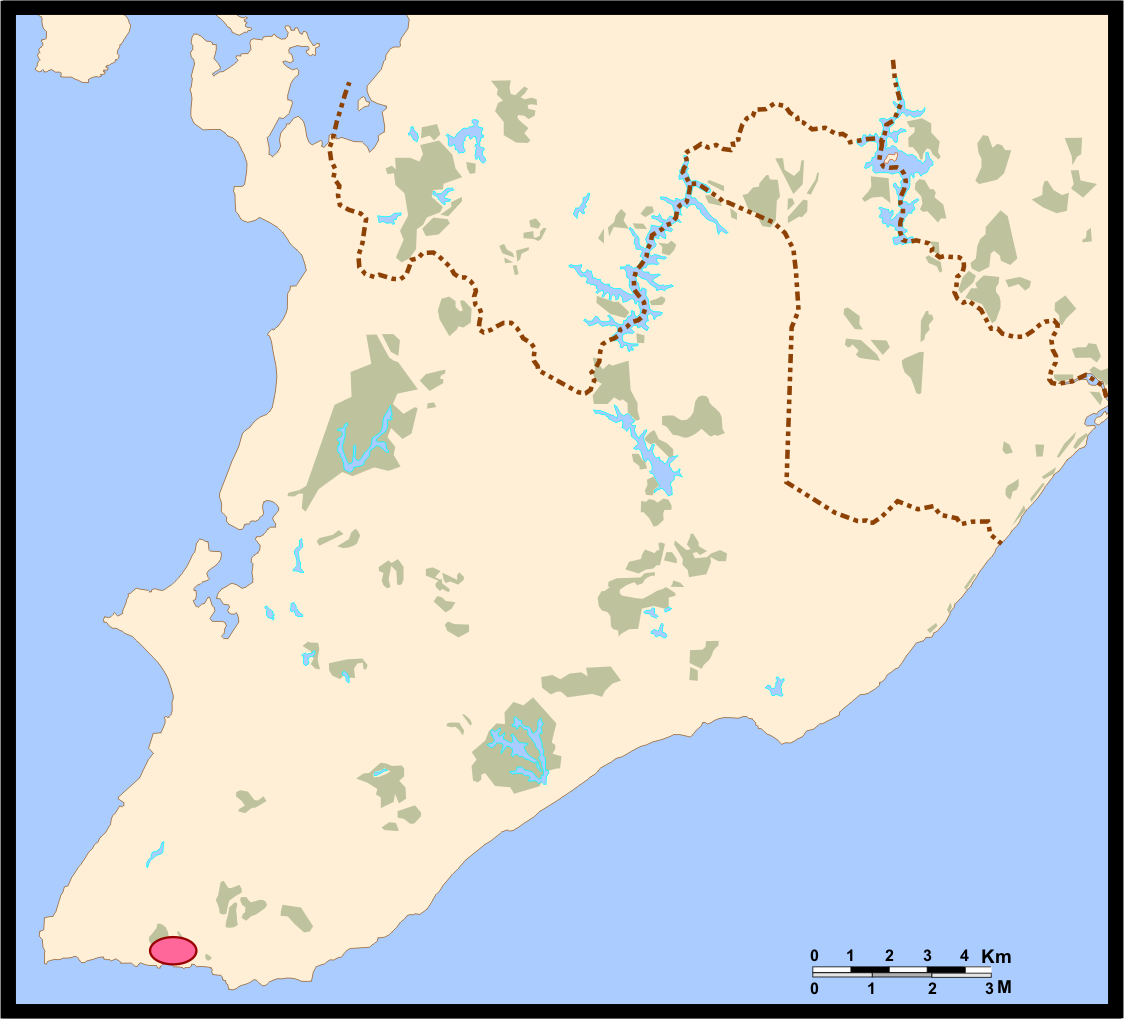
Location of Ondina.

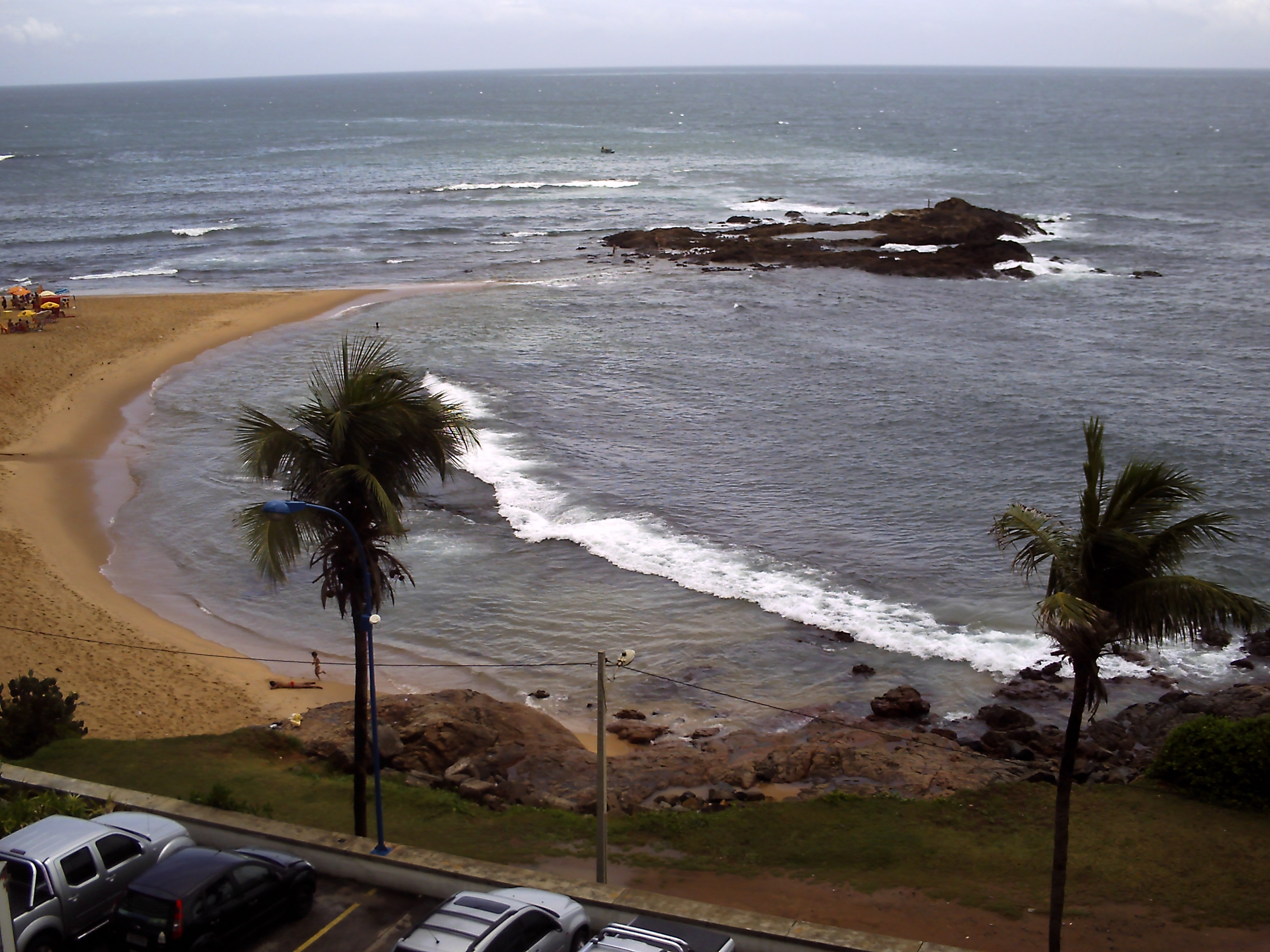
Ondina Beach

Ondina is a neighborhood located in the southern zone of Salvador, Bahia. Carnival ends here (see the "Carnival" section), several kilometers up from Barra. Ondina has a nice urban beach and some of the big, standard-style hotels (Othon Palace, Portobello, etc.).

== Features ==
It is characterized by luxurious shelter, in addition to the campus of the Federal University of Bahia. Still has the zoo in the city, the Meteorological Station and the Palace of the Governor. The latter is located in Alto de Ondina, lifting one of the attractions of the neighborhood. Ondina became part of the circuit's Alternate Carnival soteropolitano. With the growth of the festival in recent years of the twentieth century the neighborhood was built by the city administration in order to unburden the traditional areas of the circuit, especially the bar. Ondina are also located in the Pestalozzi Institute, the Institute for Rehabilitation Baiano, several units of the Federal University of Bahia (including the Plaza de Sports) and the Hospital of Veterinary Medicine.

== Location ==
Neighbor of the Barra and of the Rio Vermelho, São Lázaro and the Jardim Apipema, the neighborhood is cut by Oceanic Avenue (parallel to the sea and that starts at the Lighthouse Barra) and Anita Garibaldi Avenue. Both are interconnected by Ondine Street, through providing access to the Park Zoobotânica of Salvador is located and where the School of Veterinary Medicine of UFBA, the Biological Institute of Bahia and EMBRAPA. Between the street and Ondina Anita Garibaldi Avenue is installed part of the main premises of UFBA, as the Central Library and several faculties.
