= Oceanic Avenue =

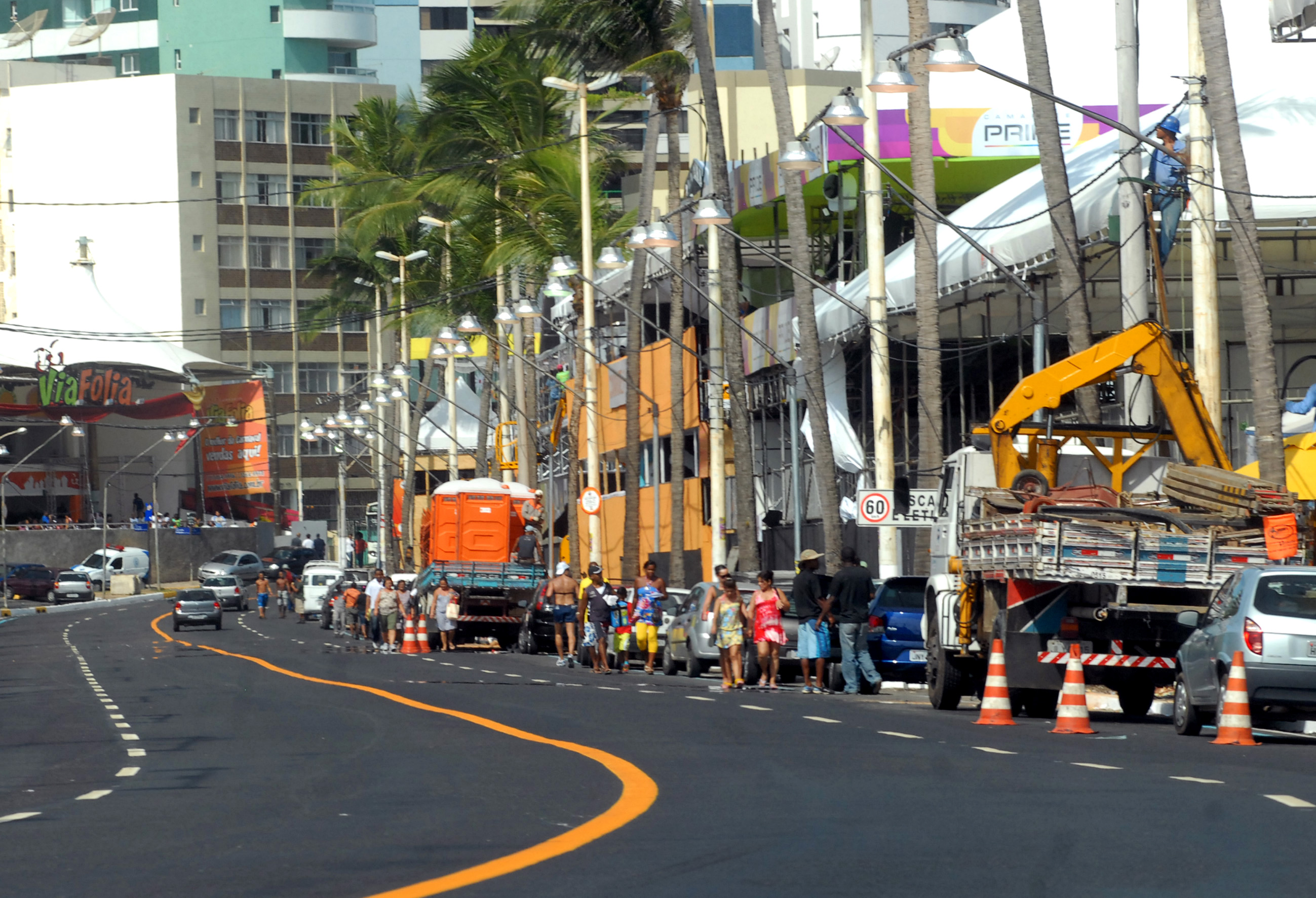
Oceanic Avenue.

Oceanic Avenue (Avenida Oceânica in Portuguese) is an important road in the city of Salvador, Bahia that starts at the Farol da Barra, Barra (Neighborhood), and ends at Paciência Beach, the end of Ondina (Neighborhood).

Oceanic Avenue is the southernmost avenue in Salvador, and for most of its course it runs parallel to the Beach.

Since the 1980s, the avenue has been identified as one of the main tourist centers in the city, with many hotels, hostels, restaurants, night clubs, shoppings, and beaches. Oceanic Avenue shelters the Carnival of Salvador.
