= Pocah =

Brazilian singer-songwriter (born 1994)

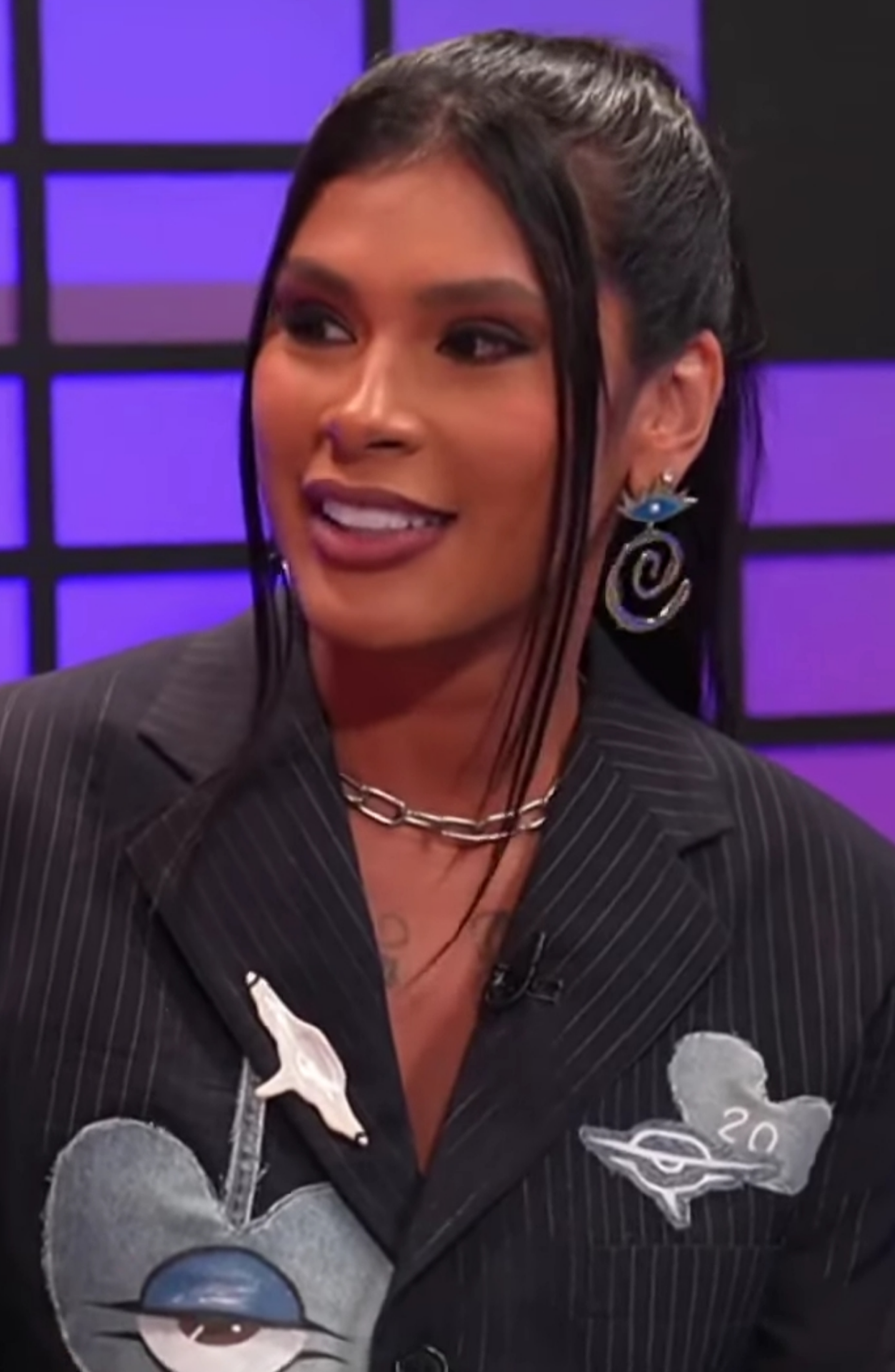
- Pocah in 2024
- Born: Viviane de Queiroz Pereira; October 17, 1994 (age 31); Queimados, Rio de Janeiro, Brazil
- Other name: MC Pocahontas
- Occupation: Singer-songwriter
- Years active: 2012–present
- Spouse: Matheus Vargas (m. 2014; div. 2016)
- Partner: Ronan Souza (2019–present)
- Children: 1
- Musical career
- Genres: Funk carioca, funk ostentação, melodic funk, pop
- Instrument: Vocals
- Label: Warner Music Group
- Website: pocah.com.br

Viviane de Queiroz Pereira (born October 17, 1994), known professionally as Pocah and formerly MC Pocahontas, is a Brazilian singer-songwriter.

== Biography ==
Viviane de Queiroz Pereira was born in Queimados, Rio de Janeiro on October 17, 1994, and raised in Duque de Caxias. The daughter of Marines de Queiroz and Leonardo Pereira, she is of African, Portuguese and Native Brazilian descent. Prior to her musical career, she worked as a manicure at her mother's beauty salon, who also had a part-time job babysitting actress Vera Fischer's youngest son Gabriel. Her first contact with music was accompanying her older brother on tours with his rock band when she was 12 years old, and during her high school years she was introduced to funk carioca.

She officially began her career in 2012 releasing the song "Mulher do Poder", which reached over 11 million views on YouTube and was considered a landmark in the then-blooming funk ostentação scene. Her posterior stage name, "MC Pocahontas", came from her alleged physical resemblance to the eponymous Disney character. As the 2010s went by, MC Pocahontas released collaborations with Naiara Azevedo and Dani Russo ("Ó Quem Voltou", which had a music video produced by KondZilla which reached over 6.9 million views), and MC Mirella ("Quer Mais?"); both collaborations were certified Double Platinum and Diamond by Pro-Música Brasil, respectively.

In 2017, rapper Future used a sample of Pocahontas' voice on the song "Fresh Air" off his album Hndrxx. The song was later used by Kylie Jenner in a make-up tutorial.

In early 2019 Pocahontas signed with Warner Music Group, changing her stage name to Pocah to avoid copyright infringement allegations from Disney. Her first release for the label, "Não Sou Obrigada", came out in April; described as an "ode to women's empowerment", it reached over 11 million views on YouTube and 35 million streamings on Spotify. Later that year, she and fellow funk singer Kevin O Chris collaborated on the song "Resenha Lá em Casa", shooting a music video heavily inspired by the series Stranger Things.

In January 2021 she was announced as one of the participants of the 21st season of the reality show Big Brother Brasil; on April 29 she became the 15th contestant to be evicted.

On September 3, 2024, Pocah released her debut full-length album, Cria de Caxias, described as an "autobiographical concept album divided in three acts".

== Personal life ==
From 2014 to 2016 Pocah was married to her manager and fellow funk singer Matheus Vargas, known as MC Rouba Cena, with whom she had a daughter, Victória (born 2016). In August 2019 she began a relationship with promoter Ronan Souza. Later on December they registered their domestic partnership, and announced their official engagement in 2021.

Pocah is openly bisexual; she first came out when she was 13 years old. In a 2020 interview for magazine ISTOÉ, she also described herself as a feminist.

== Discography ==
- Cria de Caxias (2024)

== Awards and nominations ==
| Year | Award | Category | Result | Ref. |
|---|---|---|---|---|
| 2020 | MTV Millennial Awards Brazil | Best Video Made at Home | Won | |
| 2020 | MTV Millennial Awards Brazil | Zika do Baile | Nominated | |
