= Baile Funk Experience =

2024–25 concert tour by Anitta

- Tour by Anitta
- Location: Europe; North America; South America
- Associated album: Funk Generation
- Start date: May 18, 2024
- End date: January 1, 2025
- Legs: 4
- No. of shows: 30
- Supporting act: Pedro Sampaio
- Website: anitta.com.br/en/agenda/

Anitta concert chronology
- Ensaios da Anitta (2019–2026); Baile Funk Experience (2024–2025)

Baile Funk Experience was the fifth headlining concert tour by Brazilian pop star Anitta. The tour was launched in support of her sixth studio album, Funk Generation (2024). Produced by Live Nation, Baile Funk Experience included stops in North America, Europe and South America.

== Background and development ==
Anitta declared, in her Stories on her official Instagram account, that she doesn't like touring: "The worst time of the year is going to start, what is it? The time when I go on tour. The time that was designed for me to be stressed, to stay I hate life the most. The thing I hate doing the most...". Then she confessed that she wanted to do this one in particular: "But, as I love my new album so much, I decided that I'm going to do it." In any case, Anitta intends to bring an approximate experience of what Brazilian funk parties are like in Brazil to the world's stages and demarginalize the musical genre that her own country has marginalized. Anitta also said that she intends to perform bigger shows in her home country on this tour.

== Setlist ==
This set list is from the Los Angeles show on May 21, 2024. It is not intended to represent all dates throughout the tour.

Act I

1. "Funk Rave"
2. "Grip"
3. "Joga pra Lua"
4. "Savage Funk"
5. "Double Team"
6. "Mil Veces"
7. "Used to Be"
8. "Love in Common"
9. "Fria"
10. "Meme"
11. "Movimento da Sanfoninha"
12. "Sabana" (contains elements of "Down")
13. "Lose Ya Breath"
14. "Cria de Favela"
15. "Puta Cara"

Act II

16. "Is That for Me" / "Fuego" / "Simply the Best" / "Aceita" (Interlude)
17. "Girl from Rio" (contains elements of "Garota de Ipanema")
18. "Me Gusta"
19. "Envolver"
20. "Bellakeo"
21. "Downtown"
22. "Onda Diferente"
23. "Sua Cara"
24. "Bola Rebola"
25. "Rave de Favela"
26. "Vai Malandra"
27. "Boys Don't Cry"

== Shows ==
List of 2024 concert shows
| Date | City | Country | Venue | Opening act | Attendance | Revenue |
Leg 1 – North America
| May 18, 2024 (Note: The concert on May 18, 2024, at Autódromo Hermanos Rodríguez in Mexico City is part of Tecate Emblema.) | Mexico City | Mexico | Autódromo Hermanos Rodríguez | —N/a | —N/a | —N/a |
| May 18, 2024 | Mexico City | Mexico | Salón Los Ángeles | —N/a | 2,000/2,000 | —N/a |
| May 21, 2024 | Los Angeles | United States | The Wiltern | Pedro Sampaio | 2,300/2,300 | US$175.910 |
| May 23, 2024 (Note: Anitta and Pedro Sampaio performed a pocket show in an after party at the nightclub, "Liv! Miami", following the show at "The Fillmore Miami Beach".) | Miami Beach | United States | The Fillmore Miami Beach | Pedro Sampaio | 2,713/2,713 | —N/a |
| May 26, 2024 | Orlando | United States | Hard Rock Live Orlando | —N/a | 5,500/5,500 | —N/a |
| May 28, 2024 | Boston | United States | MGM Music Hall at Fenway | —N/a | 4,074/5,009 | US$210,031 |
| May 29, 2024 | Toronto | Canada | History | —N/a | 2,000/2,000 | —N/a |
| June 1, 2024 | Chicago | United States | Byline Bank Aragon Ballroom | —N/a | 4,500/4,500 | —N/a |
| June 2, 2024 | New York City | United States | Brooklyn Paramount | —N/a | 2,700/2,700 | —N/a |
| June 3, 2024 | New York City | United States | Brooklyn Paramount | —N/a | 2,700/2,700 | —N/a |
Leg 2 – South America
| June 7, 2024 | Bogotá | Colombia | Lourdes Music Hall | —N/a | 2,000/2,000 | —N/a |
| June 9, 2024 | Lima | Peru | Centro de Convenciones Barranco | —N/a | 1,500/1,500 | —N/a |
| June 14, 2024 | Santiago | Chile | Basel Venue | —N/a | 2,002/2,002 | US$79,173 |
| June 16, 2024 | Buenos Aires | Argentina | Teatro Vorterix | —N/a | 1,500/1,500 | —N/a |
Leg 3 – Europe
| June 25, 2024 | Berlin | Germany | Metropol | Pedro Sampaio | 1,500/1,500 | —N/a |
| June 26, 2024 | Amsterdam | Netherlands | Melkweg | —N/a | 1,500/1,500 | —N/a |
| June 28, 2024 | London | England | O2 Forum Kentish Town | —N/a | 2,300/2,300 | —N/a |
| June 29, 2024 (Note: The concert on June 29, 2024, at Hippodrome de Longchamp in Paris is part of Festival Solidays.) | Paris | France | Hippodrome de Longchamp | —N/a | —N/a | —N/a |
| June 29, 2024 | Paris | France | Élysée Montmartre | —N/a | 1,380/1,380 | —N/a |
| July 1, 2024 | Ibiza | Spain | Pacha | —N/a | 3,000/3,000 | —N/a |
| July 3, 2024 | Madrid | Spain | Sala La Riviera | Pedro Sampaio | 2,500/2,500 | —N/a |
| July 4, 2024 | Barcelona | Spain | Razzmatazz | Pedro Sampaio | 2,000/2,000 | —N/a |
| July 8, 2024 | Ibiza | Spain | Pacha | —N/a | 3,000/3,000 | —N/a |
| july 7, 2024 | Milan | Italy | Fabrique | —N/a | 3,100/3,100 | —N/a |
| July 12, 2024 (Note: The concert on July 12, 2024, at Plaja Costinesti in Costinești is part of Beach, Please! Festival.) | Costinești | Romania | Plaja Costinesti | —N/a | —N/a | —N/a |
| July 13, 2024 (Note: The concert on July 13, 2024, at Hyde Park in London is part of British Summer Time.) | London | England | Hyde Park | —N/a | —N/a | —N/a |
| August 9, 2024 (Note: The concert on August 9, 2024, at Herdade da Casa Branca in Odemira is part of Festival Sudoeste.) | Odemira | Portugal | Herdade da Casa Branca | —N/a | —N/a | —N/a |
Leg 4 – Latin America
| August 30, 2024 | Mexico City | Mexico | Charms Festival Pandora | —N/a | —N/a | —N/a |
| November 2, 2024 (Note: The concert on November 2, 2024, at Puerto de Asunción in Asunción is part of Parada Skol.) | Asunción | Paraguay | Asunción Port | —N/a | 10,000 | —N/a |
| November 10, 2024 (Note: The concerts on November 10 and November 17, 2024, at the Parque Municipal Prefeito Paulo Rattes in Petrópolis are part of the Rock the Mountain.) | Petrópolis | Brazil | Mayor Paulo Rattes City Park | —N/a | 40,000 | —N/a |
| November 17, 2024 | Petrópolis | Brazil | Mayor Paulo Rattes City Park | —N/a | 40,000 | —N/a |
| January 1, 2025 (Note: The concert on January 1, 2025, at Copacabana Beach in Rio de Janeiro was part of New Year's Evening in Copacabana.) | Rio de Janeiro | Brazil | Copacabana Beach | —N/a | 2,5000 | —N/a |

List of 2024 pocket shows
| Date | City | Country | Venue | Supporting act(s) |
North America
| May 23, 2024 | Miami Beach | United States | Liv! Miami | Pedro Sampaio |
| May 31, 2024 | New York City | United States | Rockefeller Plaza (Note: Anitta performed a pocket show for NBC's Today show, at Rockefeller Plaza, on the morning of May 31, in New York City.) | —N/a |

List of 2025 canceled concert shows
| Date | City | Country | Venue | Reason for cancellation |
North America
| April 12, 2025 (Note: The concerts on April 12 and April 19, 2025, at the Empire Polo Club in Indio are part of the Coachella Valley Music and Arts Festival.) | Indio | United States | Empire Polo Club | Personal reasons |
| April 19, 2025 | Indio | United States | Empire Polo Club | Personal reasons |
