= Funk Generation =

Studio album by Anitta
- Released: 26 April 2024
- Genre: Brazilian funk; Miami bass; experimental
- Length: 35:14
- Language: English; Spanish; Portuguese
- Label: Floresta; Republic; Universal Latin
- Producer: Márcio Arantes; Botlok; Brabo; Dennis; Diplo; DJ GBR; DJ Gabriel do Borel; Jason Evigan; Rafael Fadul; Jacob Gago; Leclair; Julia Lewis; Taylor Ross; Pedro Sampaio; Stargate; Tropkillaz

Anitta chronology
Versions of Me (2022)	Funk Generation (2024)	Ensaios da Anitta (2024)

Singles from Funk Generation
- 1. "Funk Rave" Released: 22 June 2023; 2. "Mil Veces" Released: 19 October 2023; 3. "Joga pra Lua" Released: 14 December 2023; 4. "Double Team" Released: 21 March 2024; 5. "Grip" Released: 26 April 2024; 6. "Aceita" Released: 14 May 2024

Funk Generation is the sixth studio album by Brazilian singer Anitta. It was released on 26 April 2024, through Floresta Records, Republic Records and Universal Latin Entertainment. The album features guest appearances from Brray, Bad Gyal, Dennis, Pedro Sampaio, and Sam Smith. It is her third trilingual album after Kisses (2019) and Versions of Me (2022).

Funk Generation was met with positive reviews upon release, being praised for Anitta's experimentation with the album's genre, the revival of funk's cultural roots, and the artist's ability to experiment with the genre's limits, although some pointed out that her variation in styles may sound disjointed to listeners more accustomed to a uniform approach. The track "Mil Veces", one of the album's singles, won Best Latin Video at the 2024 MTV Video Music Awards and was nominated for Record of the Year at the 25th Latin Grammy Awards, where it also received a nomination for Best Portuguese-Language Urban Performance for the track "Joga Pra Lua". Both songs won the TVZ Music Video of the Year and Funk of the Year categories, respectively, at the 2024 Multishow Brazilian Music Awards, where Anitta was the first person to be honored with the Vanguarda Trophy. Funk Generation received a nomination for Best Latin Pop Album at the 67th Annual Grammy Awards.

It was named by Billboard and People as one of the best Latin albums and one of the best albums of the year, respectively.

== Background ==
After the release of her fifth studio album, Versions of Me, in April 2022 and the EP À Procura da Anitta Perfeita in November of the same year, Anitta confirmed that she was working on an entirely Brazilian funk album. At the end of January 2023, she was seen filming a series of music videos in Rio de Janeiro for the album. In April, she signed with Republic Records after ending her contract with Warner Records. She first teased the album title on June 9 with the creation of an Instagram broadcast channel called "Funk Generation". On June 22, she released the album's lead single, "Funk Rave". At the end of the month, Anitta revealed in an interview that the album would include collaborations with American singer Chlöe and English singer Sam Smith. On August 18, she released Funk Generation: A Favela Love Story as a preview of the album. The EP included the singles "Funk Rave", "Casi Casi" and " Used to Be". Although the singer initially stated that all three songs would appear on the album, only the first one was included in the final track listing.

In an interview for the Brazilian program De Frente com Blogueirinha, Anitta mentioned that the album would be released in early 2024, possibly in March. However, in late February 2024, she stated that the album's release was delayed because Sam Smith initially canceled the release of their collaboration. On March 21, Anitta announced the release date of the album and revealed that her collaboration with Smith would appear on the album; however, she mentioned that her collaboration with Chlöe might not appear on the album because it contains an uncleared sample of P. Diddy's "I Need a Girl (Part Two)" (2002).

== Singles ==
"Funk Rave" was released as the album's lead single on June 22, 2023. It reached number one in Colombia and Mexico, and number 47 in Brazil. The music video for the song was directed by João Wainer and Ricardo Souza and filmed in Rio de Janeiro. It features Anitta in a favela, where residents carry out activities such as playing football, dancing, and sunbathing. The song won Best Latin at the 2023 MTV Video Music Awards.

"Mil Veces" was released as the album's second single on October 19, 2023. It reached number 21 in Portugal and number 22 in Brazil. The music video for the song was directed by Jackson Tisi and filmed in Canada. It features Anitta and Damiano David, the vocalist of the Italian band Måneskin, playing a couple in a "tumultuous relationship". A remix in Portuguese with Brazilian singer Melody was released on January 4, 2024. The song won Best Latin at the 2024 MTV Video Music Awards.

"Joga Pra Lua" with Brazilian DJs and Pedro Sampaio was released as the album's third single on December 14, 2023. It reached number 17 in Brazil and number 48 in Portugal. The song was accompanied by a visualizer, which features the three artists on a beach at night.

"Double Team" with Puerto Rican singer Brray and Spanish singer Bad Gyal was released as the album's fourth single on March 21, 2024. The music video for the song was directed by Sam Hayes. It features the three artists and a group of people at an outdoor party.

== Critical reception ==
Professional ratings
Aggregate scores
Source	Rating
Album of the Year	70/100
Review scores
Source	Rating
Escutai	80/100
Folha	3/5 stars
G1	3/5 stars
Lorena	10/10
PopMatters	70/100
Tracklist	9.5/10
DiscoAvaliadoBR	9/10

Billboard's Luisa Calle mentioned that "no one does funk like Anitta. Singing in Spanish, Portuguese, and English, the trilingual superstar doubles down on her efforts to globalize Brazilian funk with Funk Generation." The Fader's Sandra Song wrote that "it's this measured use of Miami bass loops, samba-like percussion, and the occasional guest rapper that keeps Funk Generation from feeling less like candy-coated carioca, and more like the Latin Grammy-nominated superstar's genuine desire to finally return home."

In 2026, Gabriel Silva of DiscoAvaliadoBR praised the album's cohesion and mix of funk subgenres. The critic noted that, despite initial skepticism, Anitta delivered a consistent work that modernizes funk carioca and distances itself from prior stereotypes.

=== Year-end lists ===
Select year-end rankings for Funk Generation
Publication/critic	Accolade	Rank	Ref.
People	Top 10 Albums of 2024	10	

== Baile Funk Experience ==
On April 8, 2024, Anitta announced the Baile Funk Experience tour in support of the album.

On May 1, Anitta uploaded an eight-minute video to her YouTube channel called "Funk Generation – A Baile Funk Experience", performing five tracks from this album. The setting was reminiscent of the stage she would debut on seventeen days later on her "Baile Funk Experience" tour.

== Accolades ==
Awards and nominations for Funk Generation
Year	Organization	Category	Result	Ref.
2024	Multishow Brazilian Music Awards	Album of the Year	Nominated	
2024	Multishow Brazilian Music Awards	Album Cover of the Year	Nominated	
2025	Grammy Awards	Best Latin Pop Album	Nominated	
2025	Lo Nuestro Awards	Pop-Urban Album of the Year	Nominated	
2025	Brazilian Music Awards	Release in a Foreign Language	Nominated	

== Track listing ==
Funk Generation track listing
No.	Title	Lyrics	Music	Producers	Length
1.	"Lose Ya Breath"	Larissa de Macedo Machado; Samantha María Camara	André Laudz; Jacob Gago; Taylor Ross; Zé Gonzalez	Gago; Ross; Tropkillaz	2:16
2.	"Grip"	Machado; Melony Nathalie Redondo; Liana Banks	Arthur Gomes; Guilherme Pereira; Pablo Bispo; Rodrigo Gorky	Brabo	1:50
3.	"Funk Rave"	Machado; Redondo	Gabriel Luiz dos Santos; Márcio Arantes; Thomas Wesley Pentz	Diplo; Gabriel do Borel; Márcio Arantes; Jean Rodriguez^{[v]}	2:27
4.	"Fria"	Machado; Nathalia Marshall; Redondo	Bispu; Gomes; Gorky; Pereira	Brabo	2:07
5.	"Meme"	Machado; Camara	Andy Bauza; Arantes; Benjamin Falik; dos Santos; Pedro Wider Malcher	Arantes; Gabriel do Borel; Julia Lewis	2:30
6.	"Love in Common"	Machado; Amy Allen; Amy Wadge	Gonzalez; Jason Evigan; Laudz; Rafael Fadul	Evigan; Fadul; Tropkillaz; Rodriguez^{[v]}	2:29
7.	"Aceita"	Machado; Redondo	Arantes; dos Santos; Jamison Baken; Pentz	Arantes; Diplo; Gabriel do Borel; Leclair; Dee Mad^{[a]}; Rodriguez^{[v]}	2:07
8.	"Double Team" (with Brray and Bad Gyal)	Machado; Alba Farelo Solé; Brray	Bryan García; Eduardo Vargas; Elvin Jesús Roubert Rodríguez; Kenneth Vargas; Robert Félix	Botlok	3:52
9.	"Savage Funk"	Machado	Gabriel Henrique Nogueira; Gonzales; Laudz	DJ GBR; Tropkillaz	1:23
10.	"Joga pra Lua" (with Dennis and Pedro Sampaio)	Machado; Fernando Ps; Gabriel Cantini	Dennison de Lima Gomes; Pedro Sampaio; Shylton Fernandes	Dennis; Pedro Sampaio	2:05
11.	"Cria de Favela"	Machado; Redondo; Camara; Banks	Arantes; Bispo; David Arkwright; Decz; dos Santos; Forest Moore; Gorky; Gomes; Marty Maro; Pereira	Arantes; Brabo; Gabriel do Borel; Rodriguez^{[v]}	2:57
12.	"Puta Cara"	Machado; Camara	Arantes; dos Santos; Jorge Luis Perez Jr.; Malcher	Arantes; Gabriel do Borel; Julia Lewis; Rodriguez^{[v]}	2:02
13.	"Sabana"	Machado; Redondo	Bispo; Gorky; Gomes; Pedro Henrique Mendes; Pereira	Brabo; Rodriguez^{[v]}	1:54
14.	"Ahi" (with Sam Smith)	Machado; Carolina Isabel Colón; Sam Smith	James Napier; Mikkel Storleer Eriksen; Sam Smith; Tor Erik Hermansen	Stargate	2:37
15.	"Mil Veces"	Machado; Camara	Arantes; Falik; Cámara; dos Santos; Malcher; Pérez Jr.; Rodríguez	Arantes; Gabriel do Borel; Julia Lewis	2:34
Total length:					35:14

Note

- ^{^[a]} signifies an additional producer
- ^{^[v]} signifies a vocal producer

== Personnel ==
Musicians

- Anitta – vocals
- Tropkillaz – programming (tracks 1, 6, 9)
- Jacob Gago – programming (track 1)
- Taylor Ross – programming (track 1)
- Gorky – programming (tracks 2, 4, 13)
- Maffalda – programming (tracks 2, 4, 13)
- Pablo Bispo – programming (tracks 2, 4, 13)
- Zebu – programming (tracks 2, 4, 13)
- DJ Gabriel do Borel – programming (tracks 3, 5, 7, 11, 12, 15)
- Márcio Arantes – programming (tracks 3, 5, 7, 11, 12, 15)
- Diplo – programming (tracks 3, 7)
- Pedro Wider Malcher – synthesizer (tracks 5, 12, 15)
- Julia Lewis – programming (tracks 5, 12)
- Jason Evigan – guitar, programming (track 6)
- Rafael Fadul – programming (track 6)
- Leclair – programming (track 7)
- Botlok – keyboards, piano, programming (track 8)
- Bad Gyal – vocals (track 8)
- Brray – vocals (track 8)
- DJ GBR – programming (track 9)
- Dennis – vocals (track 9)
- Pedro Sampaio – vocals (track 9)
- Brabo – programming (track 11)
- Alice Caymmi – background vocals (track 13)
- Stargate – programming (track 14)
- Sam Smith – vocals (track 14)

Technical

- Colin Leonard – mastering (tracks 1–9, 11–14)
- Arthur Luna – mastering, mixing, engineering (track 10)
- Dennis – mastering, mixing, engineering (track 10)
- Dave Kutch – mastering (track 15)
- Rafael Fadul – mixing (tracks 1, 6, 9, 11, 13), engineering (6)
- Fabian Marasciullo – mixing (tracks 2, 4–8, 12), engineering (8), immersive mix engineering (12–14)
- Gustavo Lenza – mixing, engineering (track 3)
- Matthew Testa – mixing (tracks 4, 5, 7, 9, 12), engineering (8), immersive mix engineering (12–14)
- Tropkillaz – mixing (track 14), engineering (9)
- Rob Kinelski – mixing, engineering (track 15)
- Kuk Harrell – engineering (tracks 1, 2)
- Sean Phelan – engineering (tracks 1, 6)
- Jean Rodriguez – engineering (tracks 3, 4, 6–8, 11–13, 15), vocal programming (3, 12, 15), vocal engineering (4, 8, 12, 15)
- John Bruington – engineering (track 5)
- Sloane Esme – engineering (track 8), mixing assistance (4, 5, 7, 12)
- Pamela Velez – engineering (tracks 8, 12, 15)
- Hiram "Shults" Shulterbrandt – engineering (track 8)
- Denzel "Heartbreak" Richards – engineering (tracks 12, 15)
- Stargate – engineering (tracks 14)
- Eli Heisler – additional engineering, mixing assistance (track 15)
- Charlee "MC4" Argueta – engineering assistance (tracks 12, 15)

== Charts ==
Chart performance for Funk Generation
Chart (2024)	Peak position
Irish Albums (OCC)	36
Portuguese Albums (AFP)	3
Spanish Albums (Promusicae)	90
Swiss Albums (Schweizer Hitparade)	91

== Release history ==
Release history and formats for Funk Generation
Region	Date	Format(s)	Label	Ref.
Various	August 18, 2023	EP; digital download; streaming	Floresta; Republic; Universal Latin	
Various	April 26, 2024	Digital download; streaming	Floresta; Republic; Universal Latin	
United States	May 3, 2024	CD	Floresta; Republic; Universal Latin	
Brazil	June 21, 2024	CD	Universal Latin	
United States	November 29, 2024	Vinyl	Republic	
