= 2023 MTV Video Music Awards =

40th edition of the MTV Video Music Awards held in 2023

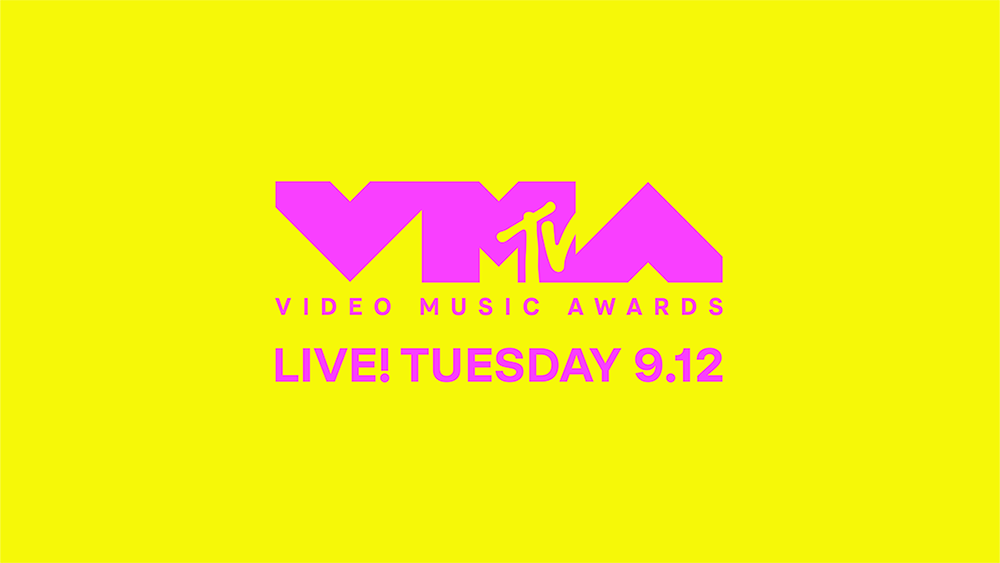
- Date: Tuesday, September 12, 2023; 8:00–11:51 p.m. EDT
- Venue: Prudential Center, Newark, New Jersey
- Country: United States
- Hosted by: Nicki Minaj (Note: Officially referred to as emcee by MTV, Minaj performed typical hosting duties such as introducing presenters and performers.)

Highlights
- Most awards: Taylor Swift (9)
- Most nominations: Taylor Swift (11)
- Website: mtv.com/vma

Television/radio coverage
- Network: MTV; MTV2; VH1; BET; BET Her; Nick at Nite; CMT; Comedy Central; Paramount Network; Pop; TV Land; Logo TV; UniMás; Channel 5 (UK); 10 Peach (AU); MTV mobile app and MTV.com
- Viewership: 3.9 million
- Produced by: Bruce Gillmer; Jesse Ignjatovic
- Directed by: Liz Clare

The 2023 MTV Video Music Awards were held at the Prudential Center in Newark, New Jersey on September 12, 2023. The show was hosted by Nicki Minaj, marking her second consecutive year in the role. This was the first time the ceremony was held on a Tuesday. A new award category, "Show of the Summer", was awarded this year through fan votes. Shakira received the Michael Jackson Video Vanguard Award which was presented by Wyclef Jean. Diddy received the Global Icon Award which was presented by Mary J. Blige. Taylor Swift was the most nominated and awarded artist of the night, winning nine out of her eleven nominations.

The 2023 edition was the most watched MTV Video Music Awards show on the flagship linear network to air since 2020. It was the highest-rated edition of the show in three years among the 18–49 demographic with a 1.03 (compared to a 0.58 in 2020), as well as among adults 18–34, where the show saw its best rating since 2019, up 118% to a 1.14. Viewership across all networks was comparable to the prior year with 3.92 million viewers.

== Performances ==
=== Pre-show ===
The performers for the pre-show were announced on September 6, 2023.

Artist(s)	Song(s)
NLE Choppa	"Ain't Gonna Answer" "It's Getting Hot"/"Hot in Herre" (with Nelly)
Sabrina Carpenter	"Feather" "Nonsense"

=== Main show ===
The first round of performers for the main show were announced on August 22, 2023. The second round of performers for the main show were announced on August 31, 2023. Olivia Rodrigo was announced as a main show performer on September 7, 2023. The third round of performers for the main show were announced on September 8, 2023. Cardi B and Megan Thee Stallion were announced as main show performers on September 9, 2023. Performers for the Hip Hop 50th Anniversary Medley were announced on September 11, 2023. Due to the ceremony's diversity, the musical performances featured artists from every country: United States, Barbados, Brazil, Canada, Colombia, Mexico, Italy, South Korea, and Trinidad and Tobago.

Artist(s)	Song(s)
Lil Wayne	"Uproar" "Kat Food"
Olivia Rodrigo	"Vampire" "Get Him Back!"
Cardi B Megan Thee Stallion	"Bongos"
Demi Lovato	Revamped Medley "Heart Attack (Rock Version)" "Sorry Not Sorry (Rock Version)" "Cool for the Summer (Rock Version)"
Anitta	"Used To Be" "Funk Rave" "Casi Casi" "Grip"
Doja Cat	"Attention" "Paint the Town Red" "Demons"
Shakira	Michael Jackson Video Vanguard Medley "She Wolf" "Te Felicito" "TQG" "Objection (Tango)" "Ojos Así" "Whenever, Wherever" "Hips Don't Lie" "Bizarrap Music Sessions: Volume 53"
Nicki Minaj	"Last Time I Saw You" "Big Difference"
Karol G	"Oki Doki" "Tá OK" (Remix)
Diddy; Yung Miami; Keyshia Cole	Global Icon Medley "I'll Be Missing You" "It's All About the Benjamins" "Bad Boy for Life" "I Need a Girl (Part Two)" "Gotta Move On" "Last Night" "Mo Money Mo Problems"
Peso Pluma	"Lady Gaga"
Stray Kids	"S-Class"
Metro Boomin; Future; Swae Lee; A Boogie wit da Hoodie; Nav	"Superhero (Heroes & Villains)" "Calling"
Fall Out Boy	"We Didn't Start the Fire"
Tomorrow X Together; Anitta	"Back for More"
Måneskin	"Honey (Are U Coming?)"
Kelsea Ballerini	"Penthouse"
DMC; Doug E. Fresh; Grandmaster Flash and the Furious Five; Lil Wayne; LL Cool J Nicki Minaj; Slick Rick	Hip Hop 50th Anniversary Medley "The Message" "The Show" "Itty Bitty Piggy" "Red Ruby da Sleeze" "A Milli" "I'm Bad" "Mama Said Knock You Out" "Rock Box" "Walk This Way"

==== Extended Play stage ====
Extended play stage performers were announced on September 6, 2023.

Artist(s)	Song(s)
Kaliii	"Area Codes" "K Toven"
Reneé Rapp	"Too Well" "Pretty Girls"
The Warning	"More" "Evolve"

=== Rankings ===
Following the show, performances were ranked by various music and news outlets.

==== Billboard ====
- Source: Billboard

Performance	Rank
Shakira – Video Vanguard Award Medley	1
Grandmaster Flash & the Furious Five, Slick Rick and Doug E. Fresh, Nicki Minaj, LL Cool J, Lil Wayne & Darryl "DMC" McDaniels – medley	2
Peso Pluma – "Lady Gaga"	3
Demi Lovato – medley	4
Anitta – "Used to Be" & "Funk Rave"	5
Stray Kids – "S-Class”	6
Doja Cat – medley	7
Karol G – "Oki Doki" & "Ta OK"	8
Olivia Rodrigo – "Vampire" & "Get Him Back!"	9
Metro Boomin, Future, Swae Lee, A Boogie Wit Da Hoodie and NAV – "Superhero (Heroes and Villains)" & "Calling"	10

==== USA Today ====
- Source: USA Today

Performance	Rank
Shakira	1
Demi Lovato	2
Olivia Rodrigo	3
Nicki Minaj	4
Tomorrow X Together and Anitta	5
Kelsea Ballerini	6
Sean 'Diddy' Combs	7
Cardi B and Megan Thee Stallion	8
Måneskin	9
Karol G	10

== Presenters ==
The first round of presenters were announced on September 6, 2023. Saweetie hosted the 90-minute pre-show event with co-hosts Nessa, Dometi Pongo, and Kevan Kenney. Nicki Minaj was announced as the main show host on September 8, 2023. Alejandra Espinoza provided in-show commentary for the Spanish-language network broadcast.

=== Pre-show ===
- Kevan Kenney – presented Push Performance of the Year
- Saweetie and Dometi Pongo – presented Video for Good

=== Main show ===
- NSYNC – presented Best Pop
- Dove Cameron – announced the finalists for Best New Artist and presented the award later in the night
- Charli D'Amelio and Dixie D'Amelio – presented Best K-Pop
- A Boogie wit da Hoodie – introduced Kaliii and the Extended Play Stage
- Nelly Furtado and Timbaland – presented Song of the Year
- Madelyn Cline – introduced Anitta
- Ashanti and French Montana – presented Best R&B
- Ice Spice – introduced Doja Cat
- Wyclef Jean – introduced Shakira and presented the Video Vanguard Award
- Billy Porter – introduced Nicki Minaj
- Fat Joe and Thalía – presented Best Latin
- Emily Ratajkowski – introduced Karol G
- Coco Jones – introduced Reneé Rapp
- Mary J. Blige – introduced Diddy and presented the Global Icon Award
- Shenseea – introduced Peso Pluma
- Tiffany Haddish – presented Best Afrobeats
- Saweetie – introduced Stray Kids
- Anuel AA – introduced The Warning
- Jared Leto and Shannon Leto – presented Best Hip-Hop
- GloRilla – introduced Metro Boomin, Swae Lee, Nav, Future and A Boogie wit da Hoodie
- Rita Ora – presented Best Collaboration
- Bebe Rexha – introduced Fall Out Boy
- Nicki Minaj (emcee) – presented Best Direction
- Sabrina Carpenter – introduced Tomorrow X Together and Anitta
- Chloe x Halle – introduced Måneskin
- Reneé Rapp – introduced Kelsea Ballerini
- Metro Boomin, Swae Lee, Nav and A Boogie wit da Hoodie – introduced the Hip Hop 50th Anniversary Medley
- LL Cool J – presented Video of the Year

== Winners and nominees ==
The first round of nominees were announced on August 8. The nominees for the Group of the Year, Show of the Summer, Album of the Year, and Song of Summer were announced on September 1. Taylor Swift led the nominations with eleven, followed by SZA with eight nominations, and Doja Cat, Miley Cyrus, Nicki Minaj, Blackpink, and Olivia Rodrigo each with six nominations.

=== Voted categories ===
The winners of the following categories were chosen by fan votes. The first round of voting known as the "General Voting Period" began on August 8 at 12 pm. ET, for the categories which nominees were announced on the same day and concluded on September 1 at 6 pm. ET, except for Best New Artist, which concluded on September 12 at 10 p.m. ET. "Instagram Story Voting" began on September 3 at 11 am. ET and concluded on September 12 at 11 am. ET.

Winners are listed first and highlighted in bold.

Video of the Year (Presented by Burger King)	Song of the Year
**Taylor Swift – "Anti-Hero"**; Doja Cat – "Attention"; Miley Cyrus – "Flowers"; Nicki Minaj – "Super Freaky Girl"; Olivia Rodrigo – "Vampire"; Sam Smith and Kim Petras – "Unholy"; SZA – "Kill Bill"	**Taylor Swift – "Anti-Hero"**; Miley Cyrus – "Flowers"; Olivia Rodrigo – "Vampire"; Rema and Selena Gomez – "Calm Down"; Sam Smith and Kim Petras – "Unholy"; Steve Lacy – "Bad Habit"; SZA – "Kill Bill"
Artist of the Year	Best New Artist
**Taylor Swift**; Beyoncé; Doja Cat; Karol G; Nicki Minaj; Shakira	**Ice Spice**; GloRilla; Kaliii; Peso Pluma; PinkPantheress; Reneé Rapp
Push Performance of The Year	Best Collaboration
**Tomorrow X Together – "Sugar Rush Ride"**; Saucy Santana – "Booty"; Stephen Sanchez – "Until I Found You"; Jvke – "Golden Hour"; Flo Milli – "Conceited"; Reneé Rapp – "Colorado"; Sam Ryder – "All the Way Over"; Armani White – "Goated"; Fletcher – "Becky's So Hot"; Ice Spice – "Princess Diana"; Flo – "Losing You"; Lauren Spencer-Smith – "That Part"	**Karol G and Shakira – "TQG"**; David Guetta and Bebe Rexha – "I'm Good (Blue)"; Post Malone and Doja Cat – "I Like You (A Happier Song)"; Diddy (featuring Bryson Tiller, Ashanti, and Yung Miami) – "Gotta Move On"; Metro Boomin (featuring the Weeknd, 21 Savage, and Diddy) – "Creepin'" (remix); Rema and Selena Gomez – "Calm Down"
Best Pop	Best Hip-Hop
**Taylor Swift – "Anti-Hero"**; Demi Lovato – "Swine"; Dua Lipa – "Dance the Night"; Ed Sheeran – "Eyes Closed"; Miley Cyrus – "Flowers"; Olivia Rodrigo – "Vampire"; Pink – "Trustfall"	**Nicki Minaj – "Super Freaky Girl"**; Diddy (featuring Bryson Tiller, Ashanti, and Yung Miami) – "Gotta Move On"; DJ Khaled (featuring Drake and Lil Baby) – "Staying Alive"; GloRilla and Cardi B – "Tomorrow 2"; Lil Uzi Vert – "Just Wanna Rock"; Lil Wayne (featuring Swizz Beatz & DMX) – "Kant Nobody"; Metro Boomin (featuring Future) – "Superhero (Heroes & Villains)"
Best R&B	Best K-Pop
**SZA – "Shirt"**; Alicia Keys (featuring Lucky Daye) – "Stay"; Chlöe and Chris Brown – "How Does It Feel"; Metro Boomin (featuring the Weeknd, 21 Savage, and Diddy) – "Creepin'" (remix); Toosii – "Favorite Song"; Yung Bleu and Nicki Minaj – "Love in the Way"	**Stray Kids – "S-Class"**; Aespa – "Girls"; Blackpink – "Pink Venom"; Fifty Fifty – "Cupid"; Seventeen – "Super"; Tomorrow X Together – "Sugar Rush Ride"
Best Latin	Best Rock
**Anitta – "Funk Rave"**; Bad Bunny – "Where She Goes"; Eslabon Armado and Peso Pluma – "Ella Baila Sola"; Grupo Frontera and Bad Bunny – "Un x100to"; Karol G and Shakira – "TQG"; Rosalía – "Despechá"; Shakira – "Acróstico"	**Måneskin – "The Loneliest"**; Foo Fighters – "The Teacher"; Linkin Park – "Lost" (original); Red Hot Chili Peppers – "Tippa My Tongue"; Metallica – "Lux Æterna"; Muse – "You Make Me Feel Like It's Halloween"
Best Alternative	Best Afrobeats
**Lana Del Rey (featuring Jon Batiste) – "Candy Necklace"**; Blink-182 – "Edging"; Boygenius – "The Film"; Fall Out Boy – "Hold Me Like a Grudge"; Paramore – "This Is Why"; Thirty Seconds to Mars – "Stuck"	**Rema and Selena Gomez – "Calm Down"**; Ayra Starr – "Rush"; Burna Boy – "It's Plenty"; Davido (featuring Musa Keys) – "Unavailable"; Fireboy DML and Asake – "Bandana"; Libianca – "People"; Wizkid (featuring Ayra Starr) – "2 Sugar"
Video for Good	Show of the Summer
**Dove Cameron – "Breakfast"**; Alicia Keys – "If I Ain't Got You" (orchestral); Bad Bunny – "El Apagón – Aquí Vive Gente"; Demi Lovato – "Swine"; Imagine Dragons – "Crushed"; Maluma – "La Reina"	**Taylor Swift**; Beyoncé; Blackpink; Drake; Ed Sheeran; Karol G
Group of the Year	Song of Summer (Presented by M&M's)
**Blackpink**; Fifty Fifty; Flo; Jonas Brothers; Måneskin; NewJeans; Seventeen; Tomorrow X Together	**Jungkook (featuring Latto) – "Seven"**; Beyoncé – "Cuff It"; Billie Eilish – "What Was I Made For?" (from the motion picture Barbie); Doja Cat – "Paint the Town Red"; Doechii (featuring Kodak Black) – "What It Is (Block Boy)"; Dua Lipa – "Dance the Night" (from the motion picture Barbie); Fifty Fifty – "Cupid"; Gunna – "Fukumean"; Nicki Minaj & Ice Spice with Aqua – "Barbie World" (from the motion picture Barbie); Olivia Rodrigo – "Vampire"; SZA – "Kill Bill"; Taylor Swift (featuring Ice Spice) – "Karma"; Tomorrow X Together and Jonas Brothers – "Do It Like That"; Luke Combs – "Fast Car"; Troye Sivan – "Rush"; Yng Lvcas & Peso Pluma – "La Bebe" (remix)
Album of the Year
**Midnights – Taylor Swift**; Renaissance – Beyoncé; Her Loss – Drake and 21 Savage; Heroes & Villains – Metro Boomin; Endless Summer Vacation – Miley Cyrus; SOS – SZA

=== Professional categories ===
The winners of the following categories were chosen by industry professionals.

Winners are listed first and highlighted in bold.

Best Visual Effects	Best Editing
**Taylor Swift – "Anti-Hero" (Visual Effects: Parliament)**; Fall Out Boy – "Love from the Other Side" (Visual Effects: Thomas Bailey and Josh Shaffner); Harry Styles – "Music for a Sushi Restaurant" (Visual Effects: Chelsea Delfino and Black Kite Studios); Melanie Martinez – "Void" (Visual Effects: Carbon); Nicki Minaj – "Super Freaky Girl" (Visual Effects: CameoFX); Sam Smith and Kim Petras – "Unholy" (Visual Effects: Max Colt and FRENDER)	**Olivia Rodrigo – "Vampire" (Editors: Sofia Kerpan and David Checel)**; Blackpink – "Pink Venom" (Editor: Seo Hyun Seung); Kendrick Lamar – "Rich Spirit" (Editor: Grason Caldwell); Miley Cyrus – "River" (Editor: Brandan Walter); SZA – "Kill Bill" (Editor: Luis Caraza Peimbert); Taylor Swift – "Anti-Hero" (Editor: Chancler Haynes)
Best Direction	Best Art Direction
**Taylor Swift – "Anti-Hero" (Director: Taylor Swift)**; Doja Cat – "Attention" (Director: Tanu Muiño); Drake – "Falling Back" (Director: Director X); Kendrick Lamar – "Count Me Out" (Director: Dave Free and Kendrick Lamar); Megan Thee Stallion – "Her" (Director: Colin Tilley); Sam Smith and Kim Petras – "Unholy" (Director: Floria Sigismondi); SZA – "Kill Bill" (Director: Christian Breslauer)	**Doja Cat – "Attention" (Art Director: Spencer Graves)**; Boygenius – "The Film" (Art Director: Jen Dunlap); Blackpink – "Pink Venom" (Art Director: Seo Hyun Seung); Lana Del Rey (featuring Jon Batiste) – "Candy Necklace" (Art Director: Brandon Mendez); Megan Thee Stallion – "Her" (Art Director: Wes Dogan); SZA – "Shirt" (Art Director: Kate Bunch)
Best Choreography	Best Cinematography
**Blackpink – "Pink Venom" (Choreographers: Kiel Tutin, Sienna Lalau, Lee Jung and Taryn Cheng)**; Dua Lipa – "Dance the Night" (Choreographer: Charm La'Donna); Jonas Brothers – "Waffle House" (Choreographer: Jerry Reeve); Megan Thee Stallion – "Her" (Choreographer: Sean Bankhead); Panic! at the Disco – "Middle of a Breakup" (Choreographer: Monika Felice Smith); Sam Smith and Kim Petras – "Unholy" (Choreographers: (LA)HORDE – Marine Brutti, Jonathan Debrouwer and Arthur Harel)	**Taylor Swift – "Anti-Hero" (Director of Photography: Rina Yang)**; Adele – "I Drink Wine" (Director of Photography: Adam Newport-Berra); Ed Sheeran – "Eyes Closed" (Director of Photography: Natasha Braier); Janelle Monáe – "Lipstick Lover" (Director of Photography: Allison Anderson); Kendrick Lamar – "Count Me Out" (Director of Photography: Adam Newport-Berra); Miley Cyrus – "Flowers" (Director of Photography: Marcell Rév); Olivia Rodrigo – "Vampire" (Director of Photography: Russ Fraser)

== Special awards ==
The following awards have special significance and are not necessarily awarded annually. Shakira was announced as the recipient of the Michael Jackson Video Vanguard Award on August 28, becoming the first South American artist to receive the highest honor. Diddy was announced as the recipient of the Global Icon Award on September 2. (Note: Even though Diddy was listed as the recipient of Global Icon Award on the MTV website on September 2, a press announcement was not made until September 5.)

Michael Jackson Video Vanguard Award (Presented by Toyota)	Global Icon Award (Note: The Global Icon Award was first awarded in 2021, and it has been annually awarded since.)
Shakira	Diddy

== Artists with multiple wins and nominations ==
Artists who received multiple awards
Wins	Artist
9	Taylor Swift
2	Blackpink
2	Shakira

Artists who received multiple nominations
Nominations	Artist
11	Taylor Swift
8	SZA
6	Blackpink
6	Doja Cat
6	Miley Cyrus
6	Nicki Minaj
6	Olivia Rodrigo
5	Kim Petras
5	Sam Smith
4	Beyoncé
4	Diddy
4	Drake
4	Ice Spice
4	Karol G
4	Metro Boomin
4	Shakira
4	Tomorrow X Together
3	21 Savage
3	Bad Bunny
3	Dua Lipa
3	Ed Sheeran
3	Fifty Fifty
3	Jonas Brothers
3	Kendrick Lamar
3	Megan Thee Stallion
3	Peso Pluma
3	Rema
3	Selena Gomez
2	Alicia Keys
2	Ashanti
2	Ayra Starr
2	Boygenius
2	Bryson Tiller
2	Demi Lovato
2	Fall Out Boy
2	Flo
2	GloRilla
2	Jon Batiste
2	Lana Del Rey
2	Måneskin
2	Reneé Rapp
2	Seventeen
2	The Weeknd
2	Yung Miami

== Music Videos with multiple wins and nominations ==
Music Videos that received multiple awards
Wins	Artist	Music Video
6	Taylor Swift	"Anti-Hero"

Music Videos that received multiple nominations
Nominations	Artist(s)	Music Video
7	Taylor Swift	"Anti-Hero"
6	Olivia Rodrigo	"Vampire"
5	Sam Smith & Kim Petras	"Unholy"
5	SZA	"Kill Bill"
4	Blackpink	"Pink Venom"
4	Miley Cyrus	"Flowers"
3	Doja Cat	"Attention"
3	Dua Lipa	"Dance the Night"
3	Megan Thee Stallion	"Her"
3	Nicki Minaj	"Super Freaky Girl"
3	Rema & Selena Gomez	"Calm Down"
2	Boygenius	"The Film"
2	Demi Lovato	"Swine"
2	Diddy (featuring Bryson Tiller, Ashanti, and Yung Miami)	"Gotta Move On"
2	Ed Sheeran	"Eyes Closed"
2	Fifty Fifty	"Cupid"
2	Karol G & Shakira	"TQG"
2	Kendrick Lamar	"Count Me Out"
2	Lana Del Rey (featuring Jon Batiste)	"Candy Necklace"
2	Metro Boomin (featuring the Weeknd, 21 Savage, and Diddy)	"Creepin'" (remix)
2	SZA	"Shirt"
2	Tomorrow X Together	"Sugar Rush Ride"

== Voting system ==
The official voting system for the 2023 MTV Video Music Awards, according to MTV, was as follows:

- Each voter must be at least 13 years or older to participate in the voting.

=== General voting period ===
- The first round of voting was known as the "General Voting Period" and included most of the voted categories (15 out of 19 categories).
- It began on August 8 at 12 pm. ET, and concluded on September 1 at 6 pm. ET, except for Best New Artist, which concluded on September 12 at 10 pm. ET.
- Each voter can vote up to 10 times per category per day through Vote.MTV.com.
- Voters should have signed in to their MTV.com Account, as its necessary to limit their votes across devices.

==== Double Days and Power Hours ====
- There were three "Double Days" with "Power Hours".
  - August 8 from 12 pm. to 11:59 pm. ET
  - August 9 from 12 am. to 11:59 am. ET
  - September 1 from 12 am. to 6 pm. ET
- During these periods, voting limits were doubled; each voter could vote up to 20 times per category per day.

=== Instagram Story voting ===
- The second round of voting is known as the "Instagram Story Voting" and includes Group of the Year, Show of the Summer, Album of the Year, and Song of Summer.
- It was held through MTV's Instagram stories from September 3 at 11 am. ET to September 12 at 11 am. ET.
- Voters can vote by clicking on their favorite nominees on Instagram polling stickers.

==== Single-round voting ====
- Show of the Summer was held as "single-round voting" from September 3 at 11 am. ET until September 4 at 11 am. ET.
- Album of the Year was held as "single-round voting" from September 11 at 11 am. ET until September 12 at 11 am. ET.

==== Triple-round voting ====
- Group of the Year was held as "triple-round voting" from September 4 at 11 am. ET to September 7 at 11 am. ET.
- In each round, nominees will proceed to the next round by bracket standings.

==== Four-round voting ====
- Song of Summer was held as "four-round voting" from September 7 at 11 am. ET to September 11 at 11 am. ET.
- In each round, nominees will proceed to the next round by bracket standings.

== Ratings ==
The 2023 MTV Video Music Awards received 3.9 million viewers across all networks, including 865,000 viewers on MTV, a 37% jump in comparison to the previous year for the flagship network and comparable total network viewers from 2022. The show marked the event's highest MTV rating among the 18–49 demographic since 2019, with a 1.03.

The show aired live on UniMás with a repeat airing right after on Univision.

== Related events ==
=== MTV VMA Fantasy ===
To celebrate the 2023 MTV Video Music Awards, Meta Fantasy Games launched "MTV VMA Fantasy" on Facebook. It had four rounds of binary question groups. It began on August 31, 2023 and concluded on September 12, 2023.

=== VMA Block Party ===
To celebrate the 2023 MTV Video Music Awards, MTV hosted a free public event titled the "VMA Block Party" for the first time at Oculus Plaza in Lower Manhattan on September 9, 2023, from 12 p.m. to 4 pm. EDT. MTV stated the event would be held annually for future shows. Alexander Stewart, Amaarae, Jenna Raine, and DJ CherishTheLuv were announced as the performers for the event on September 8, 2023.
