= Cottonwood 2 =

- Standard cover art. The deluxe edition cover is identical, but shows the word "Deluxe" written on the road. The Deluxe 2.0 cover shows NLE Choppa standing beside his daughter while holding his son.

Studio album by NLE Choppa
- Released: April 14, 2023
- Recorded: 2020–2023
- Genres: Hip hop; trap; drill
- Length: 70:50
- Labels: Warner; No Love Entertainment
- Producers: NLE Choppa; Akxen; Al Cres; Ambezza; Beat Club; Ben Billions; Biznezz Boi; CashMoneyAP; Cheeze Beatz; Chilbu; Chopsquad DJ; CRVS; Cubeatz; D.A. Got That Dope; DeCastro; Diito; Diorr; DJ Paul; DMac; Dougie on the Beat; Draco; EJ Stellar; Felmax; FinesseGTB; Fortune; Fridayy; Fya Man; Go Grizzly; Illmaestro; jetsonmade; Jordan Hollywood; London Jae; Madenka; Marsha K; Maru Beats; MikeFrom31st; Nfeparis; Nuki; ProducedbyKB; Real Red; Riico; Sayonara; Sean Momberger; Sebz Beats; Shottie; SkipOnDaBeat; Superstar O; The Beatsmith; Twhyxclusive; Twinz; Variations; YoungKio; Yuneer Gainz

NLE Choppa chronology
Me vs. Me (2022)	Cottonwood 2 (2023)	The Chosen Ones (2024)

Singles from Cottonwood 2
- 1. "Slut Me Out" Released: April 15, 2022; 2. "In the UK" Released: July 8, 2022; 3. "Do It Again" Released: October 7, 2022; 4. "Champions" Released: February 3, 2023; 5. "Mo Up Front" Released: March 10, 2023; 6. "Ain't Gonna Answer" Released: March 23, 2023; 7. "It's Getting Hot" Released: July 27, 2023; 8. "Cmon Freestyle" Released: October 22, 2023; 9. "We See You" Released: October 26, 2023

Cottonwood 2 is the second studio album by American rapper NLE Choppa. It was released through Warner Records and No Love Entertainment on April 14, 2023. The album contains guest appearances from 2Rare, Lil Wayne, Lola Brooke, Modesty, Fivio Foreign, Kevin Gates, Duke Deuce, Polo G, G Herbo, Queen Naija, and Rick Ross. The Deluxe 2.0 edition was released on October 27, 2023, and contains additional guest appearances from Gino 2x, ArrDee, Fridayy, Sexyy Red, Russ Millions, Lil Wayne, BigXthaPlug, Rob49, and Carey Washington. Production on the album was handled by a variety of record producers, including NLE Choppa himself, Ben Billions, jetsonmade, DJ Paul, D.A. Got That Dope, CashMoneyAP, Chopsquad DJ, and YoungKio, among others. It serves as a sequel to his 2019 debut extended play Cottonwood.

== Background ==
NLE Choppa made a post in May 2022 with a caption saying, "Shook All The Dead Weight, Heavenly Father, More Ready Than Ever To Receive. Prayed Deeply For This. Time To Turn It Up Some More. NEW ALBUM COMING SOON ?/??/22".

In December 2022, NLE Choppa first announced the album and was planning to release the album in February 2023. NLE Choppa began teasing the album in January 2023. On March 10, 2023, NLE Choppa announced the album cover and the release date. Four days before the album's release, he revealed the tracklist of the album.

In an interview with Clash three days before the release of the album, NLE Choppa spoke on it and how it was different from his previous projects:

I'm just trying to be versatile. I'm trying to make sure that I can tap into any sound, any mood and any genre. I want it to be whole, I want it to be the most versatile version of myself and I feel like I accomplished that.

A week before the album was released, NLE Choppa released a prelude edition, which included several unreleased songs recorded between 2019 and 2020 that had not made it to the album. Despite the songs not being released on the album with other streaming platforms, the songs were instead uploaded on SoundCloud.

== Singles ==
The lead single of the album, "Slut Me Out", was released on April 22, 2022. The second single, "In the UK", was released on July 8, 2022. The third single, "Do It Again", which features fellow American rapper 2Rare, was released on October 7, 2022. The fourth single, "Champions", was released on February 3, 2023. The fifth single, "Mo Up Front", was released on March 10, 2023. The sixth and final single, "Ain't Gonna Answer", a collaboration with fellow American rapper Lil Wayne, was released on March 23, 2023. Reworked versions of "Do It Again" featuring Summer Cem, and "Slut Me Out", which features fellow American rappers Sukihana and Sexyy Red (which were released as two separate remixes), were released on February 9 and April 7, 2023.

== Track listing ==
Bryson Potts is a common writer for all tracks; hence the "Writer(s)" column indicates co-writers.

Cottonwood 2 track listing
No.	Title	Writer(s)	Producer(s)	Length
1.	"Talk Different"	Jaucquez Lowe; Roderick Hughey; Broderick Hughey	London Jae; Twinz	3:40
2.	"Before I"	Edgar Ferrera; Jordan Gomez; Gabriel DeCastro; Otis Zirker; Yannis Kissinger; H. Ivy	SkipOnDaBeat; Jordan Hollywood; DeCastro; ProducedbyKB	2:55
3.	"Do It Again" (featuring 2Rare)	Nasseem Young; Orlando Wilder; Tramayne Watson; Miles Gregory	Fya Man	3:33
4.	"Drop Top"	Kevin Price; Darryl McCorkell	Go Grizzly; Cheeze Beatz	3:12
5.	"Ain't Gonna Answer" (featuring Lil Wayne)	Dwayne Carter, Jr.; Benjamin Diehl; Bryan Williams; Byron Thomas; Ian Lewis	Ben Billions	3:07
6.	"Mo Up Front"	Bunny Sigler; Phil Hurtt; Dameon Hughes; Derrick Jackson; Kazumi Tabat; Kevin Minton	SuperStar O; The Beatsmith; Yuneer Gainz	2:50
7.	"Automobooty" (featuring Lola Brooke and Modesty)	Shyniece Thomas; Jaquetta Singleton; Ferrera; Almondo Cresso	SkipOnDaBeat; Al Cres	4:13
8.	"In the UK"	Aleksey Kuchmiy; Niklas Bienek	Diito; Maru Beats	3:03
9.	"Champions"	David Doman; Daniel Levin	D.A. Got That Dope	4:02
10.	"All I Know"	Price; McCorkell	Go Grizzly; Cheeze Beatz	2:14
11.	"Dope" (featuring Fivio Foreign)	Maxie Ryles III; Ferdinand Media	Madenka	2:47
12.	"Pretty Brown"	Lowe; Dylan McKinney; Marcos Anoñana	London Jae; DMac; Marsha K	3:39
13.	"Home"	Ferrera; Gomez; Cristian Colon	SkipOnDaBeat; Jordan Hollywood; CRVS	2:37
14.	"Habits" (featuring Kevin Gates)	Kevin Gilyard; Tahj Morgan; Ernest Adams; Wouter Bel	jetsonmade; EJ Stellar; Sayonara	3:33
15.	"Round & Round"	Algernod Washington; Aliaune Thiam; Celestine Amajoyi; Daniel Moras	Chilbu; Felmax	2:52
16.	"Stomp Em Out" (featuring Duke Deuce)	Patavious Isom; Jordan Houston; Paul Beauregard; Amajoyi; Tim Moore	DJ Paul; Chilbu; Twhyxclusive	2:58
17.	"Thug It Out"	Mathias Liyew; Trevor Rich; Arasb Ghassemi	Ambezza; Akxen; Riico	3:46
18.	"Glide with Me"	Doman	D.A. Got That Dope	2:48
19.	"Disability Checks" (featuring Polo G and G Herbo)	Taurus Bartlett; Herbert Wright III; Ashot Akopian; Raphael Udo III	Shottie; Draco	3:22
20.	"Slut Me Out"	Alex Petit; Amritvir Singh	CashMoneyAP; FinesseGTB	2:03
21.	"On God" (featuring Queen Naija)	Queen Bulls; Timothy Mosley; Michael Williams II; Larrance Dopson	NLE Choppa; Beat Club	3:15
22.	"Cold Game" (with Rick Ross)	William Roberts II; Kevin and Tim Gomringer; Udo; Akopian; Jordan Loreal; Nathalia Marshall	Cubeatz; Draco; Nuki	4:08
Total length:				70:50

Deluxe bonus tracks
No.	Title	Writer(s)	Producer(s)	Length
23.	"Lock In"	Udo; Nfeparis; MikeFrom31st	Draco; Nfeparis; MikeFrom31st	3:45
24.	"Clyde & Dodo" (featuring Gino 2x)	Zyrion Matlock; Darrel Jackson; Jorres Nelson	Chopsquad DJ; Real Red	3:13
25.	"Envy" (with ArrDee)	Riley Davies; Kiowa Roukema; Petit; Moras; Variations	YoungKio; CashMoney AP; Felmax; Variations	2:27
26.	"Dog Food"	Douglas Whitehead; Lowe	Dougie on the Beat; London Jae	3:15
27.	"Who They Gone Call On"	Gerald Levert; Marsha Ambrosius; Joe Little III; A. Harris; E. Nicholas; N. Stewart; Sean Momberger; Illmaestro	Momberger; Illmaestro	4:42
28.	"Will Not Lose" (with Fridayy)	Francis LeBlanc; Andre Robertson; Rodney Montreal	Fridayy; Biznezz Boi; Fortune	3:43
29.	"Slut Me Out" (featuring Sexyy Red)	Janae Wherry; Petit; Singh	CashMoney AP; FinesseGTB	3:23
30.	"Shake It" (with Russ Millions)	Shylo Milwood; Sebastian Obasohan	Sebz Beats	3:26
31.	"Break the Bank"	Diorr	Diorr	2:57
Total length:				101:47

For the Deluxe 2.0, Bryson Potts is a writer for all of the tracks, as well as the featured artists on their featured track.

Deluxe 2.0 bonus tracks
No.	Title	Length
1.	"Message From Weezy" (featuring Lil Wayne)	1:32
2.	"We See You"	2:23
3.	"It's Getting Hot"	2:15
4.	"Pistol Paccin" (with BigXthaPlug)	2:30
5.	"Smokin on Them"	2:54
6.	"Cmon Freestyle"	2:42
7.	"Good Day"	2:25
8.	"Flaws" (featuring Rob49 and Carey Washington)	2:49
9.	"Auntie Living Room"	3:41
Total length:		125:00

Notes

- All track titles on all editions are stylized in all uppercase, for example, ''Dope" would be "DOPE".
- Sometimes, all of the tracks with a guest artist are labeled as with, instead of featuring.
- "We See You" samples "Funkytown" by Lipps, Inc.
- "It's Getting Hot" samples "Hot in Herre" by Nelly
- "Pistol Paccin" samples "Bitch Smackin' Killa" by Project Pat
- "Smokin' on Them" samples "Somebody That I Used to Know" by Gotye and Kimbra
- "Cmon Freestyle" samples "Still Tippin'" by Mike Jones, Slim Thug, and Paul Wall
- "Good Day" samples "Footsteps in the Dark" by The Isley Brothers
- "Flaws" samples "Ain't Nobody" by Chaka Khan
- "Do It Again" samples "Love Don't Live Here Anymore" by Rose Royce

== Charts ==
=== Weekly charts ===
Weekly chart performance for Cottonwood 2
Chart (2023)	Peak position
Canadian Albums (Billboard)	39
US Billboard 200	21
US Top R&B/Hip-Hop Albums (Billboard)	9

=== Year-end charts ===
Year-end chart performance for Cottonwood 2
Chart (2023)	Position
US Top R&B/Hip-Hop Albums (Billboard)	90
