= 2Rare =

American rapper (born 2000)

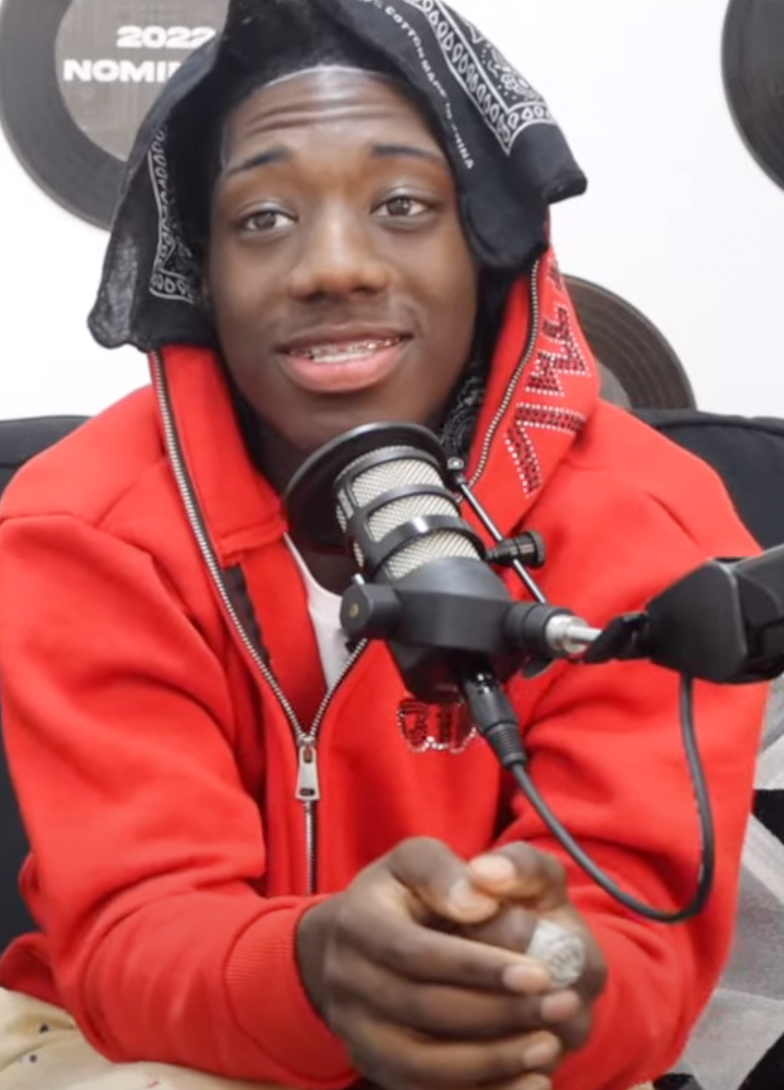
- 2Rare in 2022

Background information
- Born: Naseem Rafeeq Young; August 12, 2000 (age 26); North Philadelphia, Philadelphia, Pennsylvania, U.S.
- Genres: East Coast hip-hop; trap
- Occupations: Rapper; songwriter
- Years active: 2018–present
- Labels: Warner; Second Estate; 10K Projects; Internet Money; Homemade Projects

Naseem Rafeeq Young (born August 12, 2000), known professionally as 2Rare, is an American rapper known for his guest appearance on NLE Choppa's 2022 single "Do It Again", which received gold certification by the Recording Industry Association of America (RIAA) and entered the Billboard Hot 100. He signed with Internet Money Records, an imprint of 10K Projects in 2020, and later Mel Carter's Second Estate Records, an imprint of Warner Records in October 2022.

== Early life ==
Young was born on August 12, 2000 to Nigerian and Ghanaian parents. He was a football player during his high school years. He believed that sport would be "his lane". Originally from Philadelphia, he temporarily moved to Los Angeles due to academic issues and altercations. Later, he returned to Philadelphia where he discovered that his prolonged absence had barred him from returning to class. This led to his separation from football.

== Career ==
In 2019, he became known for his single "Big Bag", which landed him a joint venture recording contract signing with record labels 10K Projects, Internet Money Records, and Homemade Projects.

In 2020, he gained wider success with the release of his debut commercial single "Big Drippa". In January 2022, he released the single "Cupid" and it went viral on TikTok.

In June 2022, he appeared in the music video for Canadian rapper Drake's song "Sticky", and had a dance battle with Drake himself. In August 2022, he released his song "Q-Pid" with a feature from American rapper Lil Durk. In October 2022, he appeared on American rapper NLE Choppa's single "Do It Again" and in its accompanying music video. That same month, he signed with Mel Carter's Second Estate Records, which operates as part of Warner Records. Carter gave Young a US$800,000 cash advance for his signing.

In July 2023, he was featured on the 2023 XXL Freshman class with other rappers including Central Cee and GloRilla.

On May 10, 2024, he was featured on the remix of rapper DreamDoll's single "Jelly".
