= Savage Funk =

Promotional single by Anitta

from the album Funk Generation
- Language: Portuguese and English
- Released: 26 April 2024
- Genre: Funk carioca
- Length: 1:23
- Label: Floresta; Republic; Universal Latin
- Songwriters: Anitta; Laudz; Zegon; DJ GBR
- Producers: Tropkillaz; DJ GBR

Audio video
- "Savage Funk" on YouTube

"Savage Funk" is a song by Brazilian singer Anitta, recorded for her sixth studio album, Funk Generation (2024). The track is the ninth on the album and was produced by Tropkillaz and DJ GBR, through Floresta Records, Republic Records, and Universal Music Latino.

== Live performances ==
The singer performed "Savage Funk" for the first time on May 18, 2024, at the Mexican festival Tecate Emblema. The song was included in the setlist of her tour Baile Funk Experience. “Savage Funk” was also performed at the Super Bowl halftime show for the Packers vs Eagles game in Brazil and at the 2024 MTV Video Music Awards.

== Charts ==
Chart performance for "Savage Funk"
Chart (2024)	Peak position
Brazil Hot 100 (Billboard)	32
Portugal (AFP)	83
