= Do It Again (NLE Choppa song) =

2022 single by NLE Choppa featuring 2Rare

Single by NLE Choppa featuring 2Rare

from the album Cottonwood 2
- Released: October 7, 2022
- Length: 3:33
- Label: NLE Choppa Entertainment; Warner
- Songwriters: Bryson Potts; Naseem Young; Orlando Wilder; Tramayne Watson
- Producer: Fya Man

NLE Choppa singles chronology
"Mem" (2022)	"Do It Again" (2022)	"Faithful" (2022)

2Rare singles chronology
"Pop Shit" (2022)	"Do It Again" (2022)	"Lil Mama" (2022)

Music video
- "Do It Again" on YouTube

"Do It Again" is a song by American rapper NLE Choppa, released on October 7, 2022 as the third single from his second studio album Cottonwood 2 (2023). It features American rapper 2Rare and was produced by Fya Man. The song contains a sample of "Love Don't Live Here Anymore" by Rose Royce.

== Background and composition ==
The song was released shortly after NLE Choppa publicly split with his girlfriend Marissa DaNae. Over a "punchy, fast-paced" drum beat, Choppa boasts about moving on from the relationship and what his ex has lost.

== Critical reception ==
Lamar Banks of HotNewHipHop gave the song a "Hottttt" rating. Alex Gonzalez of Uproxx described Choppa as "delivering fiery bars" and wrote that 2Rare "shows off his vocal stylings, singing and rapping humorous one-liners on his verse", also praising his line "Bitch, you like a squirrel, you just like Sandy, bitch, get off my nuts" as one of the standout lines in the song.

== Music video ==
The music video was directed by NLE Choppa himself. It sees the two artists throwing a neighborhood party, where they are seen dancing, grilling wings, smashing cakes, and joined by twerking women.

== Charts ==
=== Weekly charts ===
Weekly chart performance for "Do It Again"
Chart (2022–2023)	Peak position
Canada Hot 100 (Billboard)	92
New Zealand Hot Singles (RMNZ)	27
US Billboard Hot 100	85
US Hot R&B/Hip-Hop Songs (Billboard)	30
US Rhythmic Airplay (Billboard)	9

=== Year-end charts ===
Year-end chart performance for "Do It Again"
Chart (2023)	Position
US Rhythmic (Billboard)	43

== Certifications ==
Certifications for "Do It Again"
Region	Certification	Certified units/sales
Canada (Music Canada)	Gold	40,000^{‡}
New Zealand (RMNZ)	Gold	15,000^{‡}
United States (RIAA)	Platinum	1,000,000^{‡}
^{‡} Sales+streaming figures based on certification alone.
