= Ain't Gonna Answer =

2023 single by NLE Choppa and Lil Wayne

Single by NLE Choppa and Lil Wayne

from the album Cottonwood 2
- Released: March 23, 2023
- Genre: Hip hop; bounce
- Length: 3:07
- Label: No Love; Warner
- Songwriters: Bryson Potts; Dwayne Carter Jr.; Benjamin Dyer Diehl
- Producer: Ben Billions

NLE Choppa singles chronology
"Mo Up Front" (2023)	"Ain't Gonna Answer" (2023)	"Slut Me Out (Remix)" (2023)

Lil Wayne singles chronology
"Kant Nobody" (2023)	"Ain't Gonna Answer" (2023)	"The Formula" (2023)

Music video
- "Ain't Gonna Answer" on YouTube

"Ain't Gonna Answer" is a song by American rappers NLE Choppa and Lil Wayne, released on March 23, 2023 as the seventh single from the former's second studio album Cottonwood 2 (2023). Produced by Ben Billions, it contains a sample of "Stuntin' Like My Daddy" by Birdman and Lil Wayne.

== Background ==
On February 15, 2023, NLE Choppa posted on Instagram the behind-the-scenes of the music video shoot of "Ain't Gonna Answer", as well as a clip of him giving Lil Wayne a bouquet of flowers and a thank you note as a Valentine's Day gift. Choppa announced the song was set for release on February 24, 2023, but that he would release it on February 17 if the post garnered one million likes. However, the song was released a month after the initial release date.

== Composition and lyrics ==
Over a bounce-inspired beat, the song finds the rappers delivering rapid-fire rhymes. In the chorus, NLE Choppa interpolates the refrain of "What we doing? Makin' money / What they doing? Hatin' on us" from the hook of "Stuntin' Like My Daddy": "Don't be worried 'bout what we be doin' / What we doin'? Makin' money / What they doin'? Hatin' on us". Then in the post-chorus, he raps in the flow of "Back That Azz Up" by Juvenile and acknowledges Lil Wayne's deep cut "Private Dancer" ("Big booty bitch, made her back her ass up / Shots out the switch made him bag this man up / Say that she yo bitch, she my private dancer / You can call her phone, but she ain't gon' answer". In addition, Choppa details his influence from Wayne: "From the city of Memphis, we known for mackin' and pimpin' / But I'm a hot boy, I can't lie, I got some Weezy up in me".

== Music video ==
The music video was released alongside the single. Brad Callas and Zach Dionne of Complex commented it has "arguably, some 'Fireman' video vibes from the Carter II era." Directed by Zaeim, it sees NLE Choppa and Lil Wayne rapping while surrounded by twerking women and features a Hollygrove sign. Toward the end of the video, an aspiring rapper gets out of a car to rap for Choppa.

== Charts ==
=== Weekly charts ===
Weekly chart performance for "Ain't Gonna Answer"
Chart (2023)	Peak position
US Bubbling Under Hot 100 (Billboard)	10
US Hot R&B/Hip-Hop Songs (Billboard)	33
US Rhythmic Airplay (Billboard)	5

=== Year-end charts ===
Year-end chart performance for "Ain't Gonna Answer"
Chart (2023)	Position
US Rhythmic (Billboard)	31
