= Swine (Demi Lovato song) =

2023 song by Demi Lovato

Single by Demi Lovato
- Released: June 22, 2023
- Genre: Rock; nu metal; pop-punk
- Length: 2:46
- Label: DLG Recordings, LLC; Island
- Songwriters: Demi Lovato; Alex Niceforo; Keith Sorrells; Laura Veltz; Upsahl; Oak Felder
- Producers: Oak Felder; Alex Niceforo; Keith Sorrells

Demi Lovato singles chronology
"Cool for the Summer" (rock version) (2023)	"Swine" (2023)	"Eve, Psyche & the Bluebeard's Wife" (remix) (2023)

Music video
- "Swine" on YouTube

"Swine" (stylized in all uppercase) is a song by American singer Demi Lovato, released as a charity single through Island Records on June 22, 2023. It was written by Lovato along with Laura Veltz, Upsahl, and its producers Warren "Oak" Felder, Alex Niceforo, and Keith "Ten4" Sorrells. A protest song about abortion rights, it was released two days before the one-year anniversary of the Supreme Court of the United States' decision to overturn Roe v. Wade in 2022. The single's net profits were donated to the Demi Lovato Foundation's Reproductive Justice Fund, which went to three nonprofit organizations.

"Swine" is a rock, nu metal, and pop punk track driven by drums and electric guitars. A music video for the song, directed by Meriel O'Connell, was released alongside it. The video depicts Lovato and a group of people singing the song angrily in front of men, who represent the Supreme Court. It received two nominations at the 2023 MTV Video Music Awards, for Best Video for Good and Best Pop Video. "Swine" was praised by music critics for its anthemic sound, although Christian publications criticized the song for "being against life". In the United States, "Swine" peaked at number 12 on the Alternative Digital Song Sales chart. Lovato performed the track live at the 2023 The Town Festival in Brazil.

== Release and composition ==
When surprise-releasing the song on June 22, 2023, Demi Lovato explained its origin in a statement via her social media accounts: "It's been one year since the Supreme Court's decision to dismantle the constitutional right to a safe abortion, and although the path forward will be challenging, we must continue to be united in our fight for reproductive justice." "Swine" was released as a protest song two days before the one-year anniversary of the Supreme Court of the United States' decision to overturn Roe v. Wade, ending federal protection for abortion access. Over a one-year period, Lovato's net profits from "Swine" were donated to the Demi Lovato Foundation's Reproductive Justice Fund, which went to three nonprofit organizations: NARAL Pro-Choice America, Plan C, and the National Network of Abortion Funds. Lovato's goal with the song was to make an anthem for women and people that give birth.

"Swine" marked Lovato's second political-themed released song, following "Commander in Chief", which was released weeks before the 2020 United States presidential election. Following the release of "Swine", Lovato also created a resource center on her official website, including a map that displayed the abortion rights in each state of the country. "Swine" is a rock, nu metal, and pop punk song driven by drums and electric guitars. The title of the track symbolizes how the singer sees women being represented and perceived by the United States.

== Reception ==
"Swine" was described by several music critics as an anthem. Billboard's Stephen Daw included "Swine" on its list of the best Queer Jams of the Week, and praised Lovato's "righteous indignation" on the track. Rachel Kiley from Pride.com said that the song "gives fans more insight into what to expect from the singer moving forward, as she shifts away from her pop era into a musical aesthetic that’s as bold and outspoken as she is". The website Guitar named "Swine" the best metal song of its release week.

John Cooper, founding member of the Christian rock band Skillet, called the song "pure evil". The vocalist also said: “In that song, [Lovato] supplies us with the best pro-life argument we always give, which is that people are not killing their babies because they can't afford it".

== Music video ==
The music video for "Swine" was directed by Meriel O'Connell and produced by Jagger Corcione and Becca Standt. It was released along with the song, on June 22, 2023, on Lovato's Vevo official channel.

The video depicts Lovato and a group of several people, including persons from the LGBT community, singing and showing themselves to confront a tribunal of men, which alludes to the Supreme Court, leading a revolution. It features Salem witch trials aesthetics. About the inclusivity in the video, Lovato said: "Inclusivity is just something that’s really important to me [...] There has to be representation in my work". In the video, Lovato snatches a legislation made by the Court and rips it in two, before the line of the song that says "It's your book, but it's my survival".

Kiley described the video as inclusive and intrepid. According to Glitter Magazine, it "symbolizes the level of influence that women can achieve when they unite for a cause". The music video received two nominations at the 2023 MTV Video Music Awards, in the categories Best Video for Good and Best Pop Video; it lost to Dove Cameron's "Breakfast" and Taylor Swift's "Anti-Hero", respectively.

== Live performance ==
Lovato performed the song live for the first time at the first edition of The Town Festival, held in Brazil on September 2, 2023.

== Charts ==
Chart performance for "Swine"
Chart (2023)	Peak position
US Alternative Digital Song Sales (Billboard)	12
