= Aceita =

- Jonas Blue Remix artwork

Single by Anitta

from the album Funk Generation
- Language: Spanish; English
- Released: May 14, 2024
- Genre: Pop
- Length: 2:07
- Label: Floresta; Republic; Universal Latin
- Songwriters: Larissa de Macedo Machado; Melony Nathalie Redondo; Gabriel Luiz dos Santos; Jamison Baken; Márcio Arantes; Thomas Wesley Pentz
- Producers: DJ Gabriel do Borel; Diplo; Márcio Arantes; LeClair; Dee Mad

Anitta singles chronology
"Peligrosa" (2024)	"Aceita" (2024)	"Posso Beijar Sua Boca?" (2024)

Music video
- "Aceita" on YouTube

"Aceita" (English: "Accept") is a single by Brazilian singer-songwriter Anitta released on 14 May 2024 as the sixth single from her sixth studio album, Funk Generation (2024).

== Background and release ==
According to Anitta, "Aceita" is the only song on Funk Generation that is about a political topic, her religion Candomblé, referencing the Yoruba deity Exu. The lyrics also tell how Anitta is called a "slut" and a "slum dweller" by people who judge her by her physical appearance. According to Anitta, it is also the only song that does not have a funk beat, but rather a "mix of some funk elements".

A day before the release, Anitta unveiled "Aceita" as a single with black-and-white photos from the music video, where she is shown naked in a baptism-like ritual. The footage was accompanied by a caption where Anitta references Yoruba religion traditions and beliefs distributed throughout the West African diaspora in Latin America, and particularly Cuban Santería, which combines elements of Catholicism brought by the Spanish monarchy to the Americas with spiritism.

"Aceita" was released as a single on 14 May 2024, with the music video for the song debuting on the same day. On 5 July 2024, a house remix of the song by English DJ Jonas Blue was released.

== Reception ==
The overall public reaction to the single was strongly positive. However, following the announcement of "Aceita", Anitta lost over 200,000 followers on Instagram in less than two hours following criticism over her faith. Anitta commented on the backlash that "[she has] already spoken about [her] religion countless times, but it seems that leaving an artistic work forever in [her] catalog was too much for someone who does not accept that others think differently" in a long message bidding for tolerance and peace. Anitta also claimed to be a victim of religious racism, to which professor of Latin American and Iberian Cultures Ana Paulina Lee from Columbia University commented “What happened to Anitta happens every day.”

In an album review, the Grammys called "Aceita" a "multicultural banger", noting how Anitta " finds a common thread between Brazilian funk, reggaeton, and Afrobeat" in it. Arianna Davis from Today reflected how songs like "Aceita" and "Fria" are "ideal for dancing at sweaty, dimly lit parties". Felipe Maia from Rolling Stone noted how Anitta "[breaks] through various Latin American sounds" in the song with "dembowsera vibes". Tatiana Lemes from WK Notícias analyzed the music video: "regardless of individual beliefs, the scene [of Anitta without clothes receiving a bath from a holy mother] provoked reflections on the representation of the body and artistic freedom, highlighting the complexity of the relationships between art, religion and society" and how it "continues to generate heated discussions, highlighting the importance of dialogue and mutual respect in the face of different cultural and religious expressions".

== Music video ==
The music video was filmed in early 2023. Filmed in black and white, the video features a variety of religious symbols and customs of various religions, including Candomblé, Catholicism, Protestantism and spiritualism, such as church service, studying the Bible, cowrie-shell divination, rosary holding, Anitta venerating in a terreiro, and receiving a bath from a holy mother naked. Most of the video was filmed in a Candomblé temple in Magé, Rio de Janeiro. Farher Thalles d'Oxoguian, leader of Candomblé at the Ilê Ni Oxoguian terreiro, commented on the ritual in the film that in Candomblé, the body and head are sacred and cared for, unlike in Western Christian culture, which has a taboo against the body; during rituals, there is no judgment of the naked body.

== Charts ==
Weekly chart performance for "Aceita"
Chart (2024)	Peak position
Brazil Hot 100 (Billboard)	79
