= Slut Me Out 2 =

2024 single by NLE Choppa

Single by NLE Choppa
- Released: April 12, 2024
- Length: 2:15
- Label: No Love; Warner
- Songwriters: Bryson Potts; Evan Ellicott; Javier Mercado
- Producers: Emrld; Synthetic

NLE Choppa singles chronology
"To the Fullest" (2024)	"Slut Me Out 2" (2024)	"Stickin and Movin" (2024)

Music video
- "Slut Me Out 2" on YouTube

"Slut Me Out 2" is a song by American rapper NLE Choppa, released on April 12, 2024. It is the sequel to his 2022 song "Slut Me Out". The song was produced by Emrld and Synthetic.

== Background ==
NLE Choppa previewed the song during his performance in Rolling Loud California in March 2024, prior to releasing it.

== Composition and lyrics ==
The production uses synthesizer chords and 808s, while the lyrics revolve around sex. NLE Choppa raps, "If I was a bad bitch / I'd wanna fuck me too / I'd wanna suck me too / I'd wanna slut me too." He also references rapper Diddy's sexual assault allegations.

== Critical reception ==
Vivian Medithi of The Fader wrote, "Combining chipper chords and insistently throbbing 808s, 'Slut Me Out 2' is more immediately danceable than its predecessor, obviously indebted to the wave of club rap that has swept the nation in recent years."

== Charts ==
Chart performance for "Slut Me Out 2"
Chart (2024)	Peak position
US Bubbling Under Hot 100 (Billboard)	23
US Hot R&B/Hip-Hop Songs (Billboard)	37

== Certifications ==
Certifications for "Slut Me Out 2"
Region	Certification	Certified units/sales
Canada (Music Canada)	Gold	40,000^{‡}
^{‡} Sales+streaming figures based on certification alone.
