= Lose Ya Breath =

Song by Anitta

from the album Funk Generation
- Language: English
- Released: 26 April 2024
- Genre: Miami Bass
- Length: 2:16
- Label: Floresta; Republic; Universal Latin
- Songwriters: Anitta; Jacob Gago; Samantha María Camara; Taylor Ross; Kobe; Laudz; Zegon
- Producers: Tropkillaz; Jacob Gago; Taylor Ross

Audio video
- "Lose Ya Breath" on YouTube

"Lose Ya Breath" is a song by Brazilian singer Anitta, recorded for her sixth studio album, Funk Generation (2024). The song is the first track on the album and was produced by Tropkillaz, Rosse, and Gago, released through Floresta Records, Republic Records, and Universal Music Latino.

== Live performances ==
Anitta performed "Lose Ya Breath" for the first time on May 18, 2024, at the Mexican festival Tecate Emblema. The song was included in the setlist of her tour Baile Funk Experience. The first televised performance of the song was on American TV, on The Voice, on May 14, 2024.

== Track listing ==
No.	Title	Writer(s)	Length
1.	"Lose Ya Breath"	Anitta; Jacob Gago; Samantha María Camara; Taylor Ross; Kobe; Laudz; Zegon	2:16

== Charts ==
Chart performance for "Lose Ya Breath"
Chart (2024)	Peak position
Brazil Hot 100 (Billboard)	44
Portugal (AFP)	128
