= Cowrie-shell divination =

Traditional divination practice using sea shells

Cowrie-shell divination refers to several distinct forms of divination using cowrie shells that are part of the rituals and religious beliefs of certain religions. Though best-documented in West Africa as well as in Afro-American religions, such as Regla de Ocha, Candomblé, and Umbanda, cowrie-shell divination has also been recorded in India, East Africa, and other regions.

== In West Africa ==
Several forms of cowrie-shell divination are distributed broadly throughout West Africa.

While there are many variants using from eight to 21 cowrie shells, West African-derived forms most commonly use 16 cowrie shells on a prepared table or on a mat on the ground, interpreting the patterns that result which are known as Odu. Before casting the shells, the priest/priestess invokes and salutes the Orishas, and puts questions to them. The Orishas answer the questions by influencing the way the shells fall on the table.

=== Ẹẹ́rìndínlógún ===
Ẹẹ́rìndínlógún (from the Yoruba owó mẹ́rìndínlógún "sixteen cowries", literally "four taken from 20") is a cowrie-shell divination method practiced in the Yoruba religion.

The number 16 holds important significance in Yoruba faith as it was the purported number of original divinities that established life on earth. In merindinlogun divination, the shells are thrown and the number of shells that fall with the opening facing up is associated with a certain odu. This system of divination is used when consulting the Orishas.

== In the African diaspora ==
Cowrie-shell divination is found in Latin America where it plays an important role in religions like Santería and Candomblé.

In Cuba, Dominican Republic, and Puerto Rico, it is called dilogun.

In Brazil, it is called jogo de búzios or merindinlogun.

Though they share a common root, Caribbean and South American cowrie shell divination have subsequently developed in independence from West African practice. For example, among Caribbean diviners, the first throw of the shells involves throwing them twice to derive a composite Odu. While there are regional practices in Yorubaland where this is also the case, it is not as standardized and uniform as it is in Cuba, suggesting a weaker quality control by Cuban Ifá priests.

=== In Santería ===
The cowrie-shells, called Diloggún, are used by priests and priestesses of Santería, who are called Santeros and Santeras, respectively. Both men and women who have been initiated into Santería can read cowrie shells. There are a combination of 256 possible odu and a skilled diviner can interpret the meaning of each one, depending on the orientation of the reading. If the reading comes in Ire, the client will experience good fortune, and if it comes in Osogbo, the client faces obstacles that can be overcome with the help of the Orichás.

=== In Candomblé ===
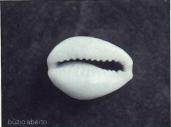
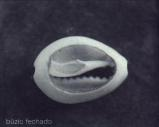
Cowrie shell modified for divination, showing the natural and contrived openings.

The cowrie shell, as collected from a beach, has a flattened side with a longitudinal slit, and a smooth, rounded side. Like a coin, the shell has only two stable positions on a flat surface, with the slit side facing either up or down. A few cowrie-shell diviners use the shells in this natural state; then the outcome of the throw, for each piece, is either "open" (slit up) or "closed" (slit down). Some modern day witches also use cowrie shell divination.

Most priests, however, use modified shells whose rounded part has been ground away, creating a second, artificial opening. The two stable positions of the shell are still called "open" or "closed" for divination purposes. In most Candomblé houses, "open" still means that the natural opening is facing up; but some traditions (mainly in Candomblé Ketu) use the opposite convention. The number of "open" shells is used to select an item (odú) which direct the diviner to a fixed list of oracular verses.
