= Mel Carter (businessman) =

- Born: 1985 (age 40–41); Port of Spain, Trinidad and Tobago
- Occupations: Businessman, record executive, podcaster
- Years active: 2015 – present
- Children: 1

Mel Carter (born January 14, 1985) is an American businessman and music executive, originally from Trinidad and Tobago. He is the former Senior Vice President of A&R at Republic Records and is the founder of Second Estate Records, a record label distributed by Warner Records since 2022.

Carter is the owner of a franchise development company, Melanbo, which has acquired dozens of Bojangles fast food franchises across the United States with Kevin "Coach K" Lee. He is the co-host of the finance-based podcast called “Business Untitled” with Mike Novogratz and Dave Barry.

== Personal life ==
Carter was born in Port of Spain, Trinidad and Tobago to Clifton Carter and Stacy Jenkinson. He emigrated with his mother and sister to the United States in 1997, settling in Flatbush, Brooklyn. Between the 7th grade and 10th grade, Carter was kicked out of four different schools before ultimately dropping out. Carter has one child, a daughter born in 2006. He has one sister.

== Career ==
=== Music industry ===
Carter began his career as a talent manager for artists that were later signed to Republic Records, Atlantic Records, Roc Nation, and Interscope. Carter is the Founder of Hikari-Ultra, a joint venture with Republic Records that discovered the music group City Morgue. In 2018, Carter began working with Republic Records, as Senior Vice President of A&R, overseeing the Hikari-Ultra imprint. He was the first Senior Vice President of Republic Records without a high school diploma.

Carter exited Republic Records in October 2022 to launch a label, Second Estate Records, which is distributed by Warner Records.

=== Other ventures ===
Carter is the owner of the franchise development company, Melanbo. Quality Control Music’s founder and COO, Kevin Lee, is an investor in Melanbo. The group has acquired more than 32 Bojangles fast food franchise stores. Carter is a former investor in Nas’ restaurant group, Sweet Chick, but later sold his shares due to conflict of interest with Bojangles. Carter co-founded Adansonia in 2023, a real estate firm focused on developing affordable housing in the New York tri-state area. Carter is the co-host of a finance-based podcast called “Business Untitled” with Mike Novogratz, founder of the technology-financial services firm Galaxy Digital, and real estate developer Dave Barry.
