= Slut Me Out =

2022 single by NLE Choppa

Single by NLE Choppa

from the album Cottonwood 2
- Released: April 15, 2022
- Genre: Dirty rap
- Length: 2:03
- Label: No Love; Warner
- Songwriters: Bryson Potts; Alex Petit; Amritvir Singh
- Producers: CashMoneyAP; FinesseGTB

NLE Choppa singles chronology
"Yak Flow" (2022)	"Slut Me Out" (2022)	"Bustdown Rollie Avalanche" (2022)

Music video
- "Slut Me Out" on YouTube
- "Slut Me Out (Remix)" on YouTube

"Slut Me Out" is a song by American rapper NLE Choppa, released on April 15, 2022, by No Love Entertainment and Warner Records as the lead single for his second studio album Cottonwood 2 (2023). Produced by CashMoneyAP and FinesseGTB, the song was a sleeper hit; it gained widespread attention in 2023 and spawned a remix with Missouri-based rapper Sexyy Red.

On April 12. 2024, NLE Choppa released a sequel, "Slut Me Out 2".

== Content ==
The song has a fast tempo and features sexually explicit lyrics, finding NLE Choppa detailing sex while boasting about his vegan lifestyle.

== Music video ==
An official music video was released on April 22, 2022. Directed by Ben Marc, it sees NLE Choppa dancing and relaxing with many women, as well as having two different sexual partners in an airplane bathroom.

== Remixes ==
An official remix of the song features American rapper Sexyy Red and was released on April 7, 2023, along with a music video, which sees Choppa and Red partying in Miami, dancing in a studio as well as near a beach while surrounded by bikini-clad women. Rapper Sukihana makes an appearance in the video, and is featured on a second remix released on April 24, 2023. The first remix appears on the deluxe version of Cottonwood 2.

== Charts ==
=== Weekly charts ===
Chart performance for "Slut Me Out"
Chart (2023)	Peak position
Australia (ARIA)	48
Canada Hot 100 (Billboard)	24
Global 200 (Billboard)	48
Ireland (IRMA)	70
Lithuania (AGATA)	74
New Zealand Hot Singles (RMNZ)	15
UK Singles (Official Charts)	68
US Billboard Hot 100	28
US Hot R&B/Hip-Hop Songs (Billboard)	9

=== Year-end charts ===
Year-end chart performance for "Slut Me Out"
Chart (2023)	Position
US Hot R&B/Hip-Hop Songs (Billboard)	33

== Certifications ==
Certifications for "Slut Me Out"
Region	Certification	Certified units/sales
Australia (ARIA)	Gold	35,000^{‡}
Canada (Music Canada)	Platinum	80,000^{‡}
New Zealand (RMNZ)	Platinum	30,000^{‡}
Poland (ZPAV)	Gold	25,000^{‡}
United States (RIAA)	2× Platinum	2,000,000^{‡}
^{‡} Sales+streaming figures based on certification alone.
