= Funk Rave =

Single by Anitta

from the album Funk Generation
- Language: Spanish
- Released: 22 June 2023
- Length: 2:27
- Label: Floresta; Republic; Universal Latin
- Songwriters: Anitta; DJ Gabriel do Borel; Thomas Wesley; Márcio Arantes; Melony Nathalie Redondo
- Producers: Diplo; DJ Gabriel do Borel; Márcio Arantes

Anitta singles chronology
"Capitán" (2023)	"Funk Rave" (2023)	"Back for More" (2023)

Music video
- "Funk Rave" on YouTube

"Funk Rave" is a song by Brazilian singer Anitta, recorded for her fourth EP, Funk Generation: A Favela Love Story, (2023), and her sixth studio album, Funk Generation (2024). The song was written by Anitta, Diplo, DJ Gabriel do Borel, Márcio Arantes, and Melymel, with production handled by Diplo, DJ Gabriel do Borel, and Márcio Arantes.

It was released as the first single from the visual EP on June 22, 2023, through Floresta Records, Republic Records, and Universal Latin Entertainment, marking her first release with these labels. The song features a pulsating and infectious beat, characteristic of phonk rhythms, combined with electronic elements and rave influences. The lyrics of "Funk Rave" reflect the energy and vibe of rave parties.

== Background and release ==
In April 2023, Anitta signed with Republic Records after leaving Warner Records. During the 2023 Met Gala, Anitta revealed that her next studio album would be in Spanish and English, inspired by Brazilian funk. On June 10, 2023, Anitta announced "Funk Rave" on her social media. A few days later, she revealed the release date and the single's cover art.

== Music video ==
The music video for "Funk Rave" was filmed at the end of January 2023 in Rio de Janeiro. A video showing the recording of a scene where Anitta simulated oral sex with Brazilian model Yuri Meirelles went viral and sparked controversy. In an interview with UOL Splash, Anitta commented, "People need to see the final result to understand what it's about. Unfortunately, we can't control people making and sharing videos. What we can hope for now is that people see the outcome of this work. I’ve come to the conclusion that I’m an artist who fights for sexual freedom. It’s against hypocrisy. I think that over all these years of my career, I’ve seen a lot of hypocrisy happening".

The music video, directed by João Wainer and Ricardo Souza, was released on June 23, 2023. It depicts people going about their daily lives in a favela, engaging in activities such as playing soccer, dancing, enjoying the sun, and having a barbecue. Near the end of the video, the previously mentioned controversial scene is presented, where Anitta and a young man move to a corner, kiss, and there are insinuations of oral sex. Several shots throughout the video allude to this theme, such as a licked orange, a champagne bottle being opened, and a train repeatedly entering and exiting a tunnel.

== Live performances and accolades ==
Anitta performed a snippet of "Funk Rave" at the 2022–23 UEFA Champions League on June 10, 2023. On August 17, 2023, Anitta performed a medley of "Casi Casi" and "Funk Rave," along with "Used to Be," "Nu," "Vai Vendo," and "Ai Papai" on Domingão com Huck, which aired on August 20, 2023.

Year	Award ceremony	Category	Result	Ref.
2023	MTV Video Music Awards	Best Latin	Won	
2023	Prêmio Jovem Brasileiro	Hit do Ano	Pending	

== Charts ==
Weekly chart performance for "Funk Rave"
Chart (2023)	Peak position
ERROR in "Billboardbrasilhot100": Unknown chart "Billboardbrasilhot100".
Brazil (Top 10 Latino)	1
Colombia (Monitor Latino)	3
Colombia (National Report)	1
Ecuador (Monitor Latino Urbano)	9
Guatemala (Monitor Latino Pop)	15
Mexico (Monitor Latino)	1
Global (Billboard Global Excl. US)	200
Nicaragua (Monitor Latino Urbano)	14
Portugal (AFP)	27
Portugal (Billboard)	24

== Certifications ==
Certifications for "Funk Rave"
Region	Certification	Certified units/sales
United States (RIAA)	Gold (Latin)	30,000^{‡}
^{‡} Sales+streaming figures based on certification alone.

== Release history ==
Region	Date	Formato(s)	Format(s)	Ref.
Various	June 22, 2023	Digital download; streaming	Floresta Records; Republic Records; Universal Music Latino	
Italy	June 23, 2023	Airplay	Universal Music Latino	
