= Mil Veces =

Single by Anitta

from the album Funk Generation
- Language: Spanish
- Released: 19 October 2023
- Length: 2:34
- Label: Floresta; Republic; Universal Latin
- Songwriters: Anitta; Marcio Arantes; DJ Gabriel do Borel; Benjamin Falik; Samantha María Camara; Jr.; Elvis Jesus Roubert-Rodriguez; Jorge Luis Perez; Pedro Wider Malcher
- Producers: Marcio Arantes; DJ Gabriel do Borel; Julia Lewis

Anitta singles chronology
"Back for More" (2023)	"Mil Veces" (2023)	"Double Team" (2024)

Music video
- "Mil Veces" on YouTube

"Mil Veces" is a song by Brazilian singer Anitta, recorded for her sixth studio album, Funk Generation (2024). The song was released as the second single from the album on 19 October 2023, through Floresta Records, Republic Records, and Universal Latin Entertainment.

== Background ==
On 17 August 2023, Anitta released the extended play (EP) Funk Generation: A Favela Love Story, an audiovisual project and the "first chapter" of her sixth studio album. The project contains three official singles—"Funk Rave", "Casi Casi", and "Used to Be"—all released with their respective music videos. On 23 September 2023, Anitta performed at the song at the Global Citizen Festival in New York City, an event that advocates for environmental and global development causes. On 27 September, Anitta shared a preview of the song on her TikTok.

The singer announced the release date of "Mil Veces" as October 19, along with its music video, which was filmed in Canada and features Italian singer Damiano David, lead vocalist of the rock band Måneskin.

== Live performances ==
Anitta first performed "Mil Veces" on 20 November 2023, at Operación Triunfo. On 25 November, she performed the song at Megaland Music Fest. On 10 December, the singer presented it at TikTok In The Mix. On 22 February 2024, she performed the song at Premio Lo Nuestro 2024. On 28 February, Anitta presented it at the Festival de Viña del Mar. The artist included the song in her entire setlist from then on.

== Accolades ==
Awards and nominations for "Mil Veces"
Organization	Year	Category	Result	Ref.
MTV Video Music Awards	2024	Best Latin	Won	
Latin Grammy Awards	2024	Record of the Year	Nominated	
Multishow Brazilian Music Awards	2024	TVZ Music Video of the Year	Won	
WME Awards	2024	Latin American Song	Nominated	

== Charts ==
Chart performance for "Mil Veces"
Chart (2023)	Peak position
Brazil Hot 100 (Billboard)	22
Brazil (Crowley Latino Airplay)	2
Portugal (AFP)	48

== Certifications ==
Certifications for "Mil Veces"
Region	Certification	Certified units/sales
Brazil (Pro-Música Brasil)	Diamond	160,000^{‡}
United States (RIAA)	Gold (Latin)	30,000^{‡}
^{‡} Sales+streaming figures based on certification alone.
