= MTV Video Music Award for Best Latin =

Annual music video award

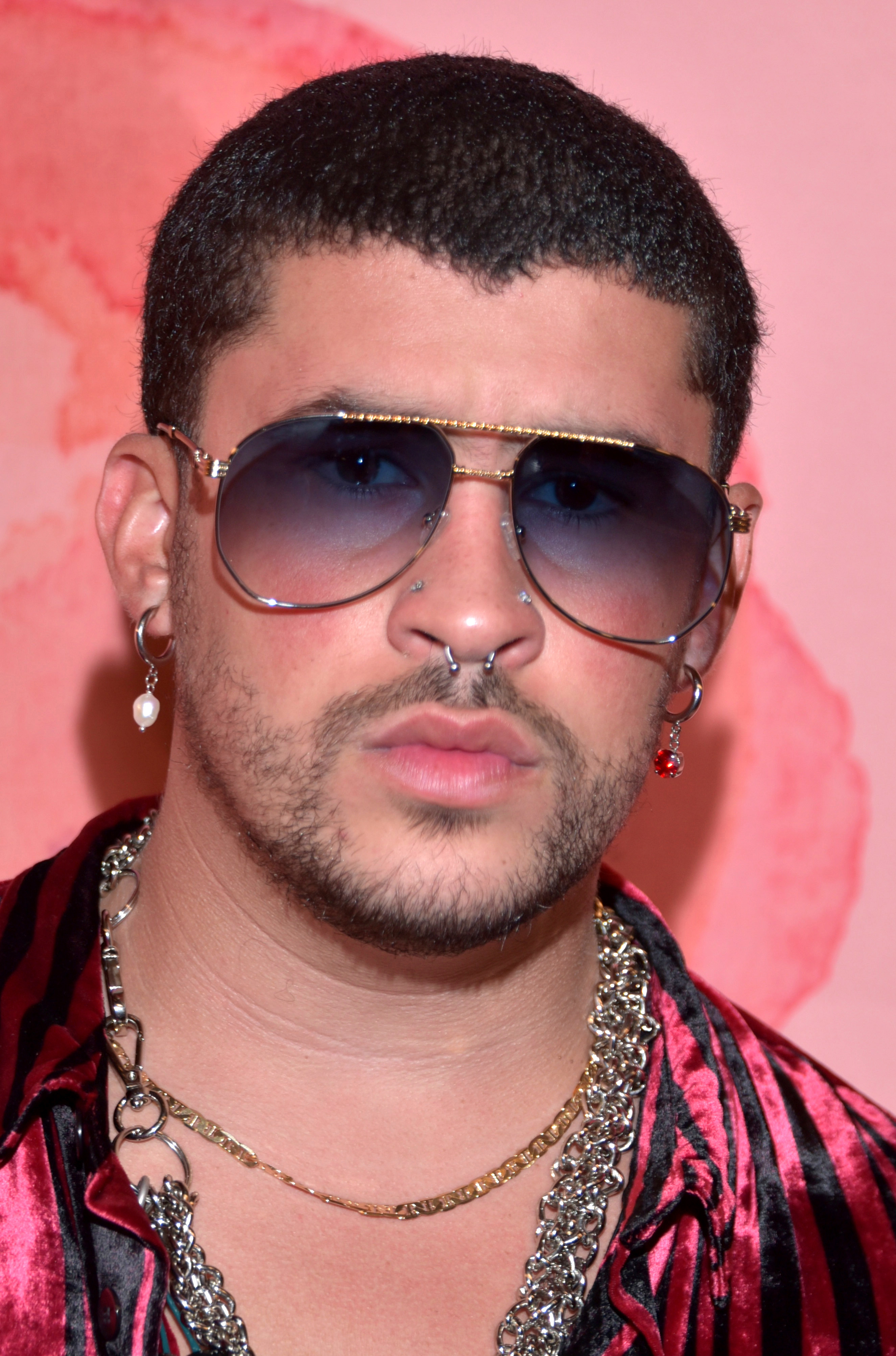
- Bad Bunny is the most recent recipient for "Nuevayol"
- Awarded for: Latin music genre music videos
- Country: United States
- Presented by: MTV
- First award: 2010
- Currently held by: Bad Bunny – "Nuevayol" (2026)

Highlights
- Most awards: J Balvin & Anitta (3)
- Most nominations: J Balvin & Bad Bunny (9)
- Website: VMA website

The MTV Video Music Award for Best Latin was first presented in 2010 under the name Best Latino Artist, replacing the MTV Latin America Awards, which ended in 2009. From 2010 to 2013, the award was determined by viewer votes on MTV Tr3́s' official website. However, the winner did not receive the award during the main ceremony; in later years, the recipient was announced during the Spanish-language rebroadcast on Tr3́s. This marked the first time Latin music artists were honored at the MTV Video Music Awards since the International Viewer's Choice Award for MTV Latin America, which ran from 1994 to 2002.

The award was not presented from 2014 to 2017, but it returned in 2018 under the current name Best Latin, now recognizing music videos and their performing artists.

J Balvin and Anitta are the biggest winners of this award, with three wins each. Balvin is tied with Bad Bunny as the most-nominated artists in the category, with nine nominations each.

== Recipients ==
=== 2010s ===
Recipients
Year (Note: Each year is linked to the article about the MTV Video Music Awards held that year.)	Winner(s)	Video	Nominees	Ref.
2010	Aventura	—N/a	Camila; Daddy Yankee; Pitbull; Shakira; Wisin & Yandel	
2011	Wisin & Yandel	"Zun Zun Rompiendo Caderas"	Don Omar and Lucenzo — "Danza Kuduro"; Enrique Iglesias (featuring Ludacris and DJ Frank E) — "Tonight (I'm Lovin' You)"; Maná — "Lluvia al Corazón"; Prince Royce — "Corazón Sin Cara"	
2012	Romeo Santos	—N/a	Juanes; Jennifer Lopez; Pitbull; Wisin & Yandel	
2013	Daddy Yankee	—N/a	Don Omar; Jesse & Joy; Pitbull; Alejandro Sanz	
2014–2017	—N/a			
2018	J Balvin and Willy William	"Mi Gente"	Daddy Yankee – "Dura"; Luis Fonsi and Demi Lovato – "Échame la Culpa"; Jennifer Lopez (featuring DJ Khaled and Cardi B) – "Dinero"; Maluma – "Felices los 4"; Shakira (featuring Maluma) – "Chantaje"	
2019	Rosalía and J Balvin (featuring El Guincho)	"Con Altura"	Anuel AA and Karol G – "Secreto"; Bad Bunny (featuring Drake) – "Mia"; Benny Blanco, Tainy, Selena Gomez and J Balvin – "I Can't Get Enough"; Daddy Yankee (featuring Snow) – "Con Calma"; Maluma – "Mala Mía"	

=== 2020s ===
Recipients
Year (Note: Each year is linked to the article about the MTV Video Music Awards held that year.)	Winner(s)	Video	Nominees	Ref.
2020	Maluma (featuring J Balvin)	"Qué Pena"	Anuel AA (featuring Daddy Yankee, Ozuna, Karol G and J Balvin) – "China"; Bad Bunny – "Yo Perreo Sola"; J Balvin – "Amarillo"; Black Eyed Peas (featuring Ozuna and J. Rey Soul) – "Mamacita"; Karol G (featuring Nicki Minaj) – "Tusa"	
2021	Billie Eilish and Rosalía	"Lo Vas a Olvidar"	Bad Bunny and Jhay Cortez – "Dakiti"; J Balvin, Dua Lipa, Bad Bunny and Tainy – "Un Día (One Day)"; Black Eyed Peas and Shakira – "Girl Like Me"; Karol G – "Bichota"; Maluma – "Hawái"	
2022	Anitta	"Envolver"	Bad Bunny – "Tití Me Preguntó"; J Balvin and Skrillex – "In da Getto"; Becky G and Karol G – "Mamiii"; Daddy Yankee – "Remix"; Farruko – "Pepas"	
2023	Anitta	"Funk Rave"	Bad Bunny – "Where She Goes"; Eslabon Armado and Peso Pluma – "Ella Baila Sola"; Grupo Frontera and Bad Bunny – "Un x100to"; Karol G and Shakira – "TQG"; Rosalía – "Despechá"; Shakira – "Acróstico"	
2024	Anitta	"Mil Veces"	Bad Bunny – "Monaco"; Karol G – "Mi Ex Tenía Razón"; Myke Towers – "Lala"; Peso Pluma and Anitta – "Bellakeo"; Rauw Alejandro – "Touching The Sky"; Shakira and Cardi B – "Puntería"	
2025	Shakira	"Soltera"	Bad Bunny – "Baile Inolvidable"; J Balvin – "Rio"; Karol G – "Si Antes Te Hubiera Conocido"; Peso Pluma – "La Patrulla"; Rauw Alejandro and Romeo Santos – "Khé?"	
2026	Bad Bunny	"Nuevayol"	Anitta and Shakira – "Choka Choka"; Fuerza Regida – "Tu Sancho"; Karol G – "Papasito"; Rosalía (featuring Yahritza y su Esencia) – "La Perla"; Ryan Castro, Kapo and Gangsta – "La Villa"; Shakira and Burna Boy – "Dai Dai"	

== Statistics ==
=== Artists with multiple wins ===
3 wins

- J Balvin
- Anitta

2 wins

- Rosalía

=== Artists with multiple nominations ===
9 nominations

- J Balvin
- Bad Bunny
- Shakira
- Karol G

5 nominations

- Maluma
- Anitta

4 nominations

- Rosalía

3 nominations

- Peso Pluma
- Pitbull
- Wisin & Yandel

2 nominations

- Cardi B
- Jennifer Lopez
- Rauw Alejandro
- Romeo Santos

== See also ==
- MTV Europe Music Award for Best Latin
