= It's Getting Hot =

2023 single by NLE Choppa

Single by NLE Choppa

from the album Cottonwood 2
- Released: July 27, 2023
- Genre: Southern hip hop; trap
- Length: 2:14
- Label: No Love; Warner
- Songwriters: Bryson Potts; Raphael Udo III; Xavier Barrios; Dameon Hughes; Cornell Haynes; Pharrell Williams; Charles Brown
- Producers: Draco; Project X; Superstar O

NLE Choppa singles chronology
"Don't Run" (2023)	"It's Getting Hot" (2023)	"Triple A" (2023)

Music video
- "It's Getting Hot" on YouTube

"It's Getting Hot" is a single by American rapper NLE Choppa from the deluxe edition of Cottonwood 2. It was released on July 27, 2023 with an accompanying music video. Produced by Draco, Project X and Superstar O, it samples and interpolates the song "Hot in Herre" by Nelly.

== Background ==
NLE Choppa teased the song and its music video on July 25, 2023, which was set to be released on July 28 but wrote he would release it earlier if the post received 10,000 comments. The song was released the following day on July 27.

== Composition ==
The instrumental of the song is a modified version of that of "Hot in Herre", with a modern characteristic trap music drum beat sound achieved by using a Roland TR-808 drum sound that is capable of a much more aggressive sound than older acoustic drum samples, in addition, the bass guitar tone and bassline were also replaced with an 808 sub bass line. The vocals still have Auto-tune and some chorus and vocoder effects that were not on the original. The overall sound gives the sound of a crunk and modern hip hop club music . The lyrics deal with similar topics to that of the original song, though NLE Choppa performs in a different flow; he also sings the chorus of "Hot in Herre", which are followed by vocally reimagined female background vocals.

== Reception ==
The song was met with mixed reception from fans. Nelly expressed approval of the homage, reposting the video with a comment "Go Up Nephew". In contrast, the song also received adverse criticism on social media. Millennial writers Alex Suskind and Hershal Pandya of Vulture debated the merit of NLE Choppa's remaking of "Hot in Herre". Choppa appeared to be unbothered about the negative reactions, even responding with laughing emojis and confident comments.

== Music video ==
The music video sees NLE Choppa dressing like Nelly in the "Hot in Herre" video, wearing a headband, A-shirt, baggy jeans, a Hardwood Classics Denver Nuggets throwback jersey, A Bathing Ape sneakers, and a band-aid under his eye. He is seen surrounded by bikini-clad women at a pool party, and rapping in the booth as he reads from a Danger Hiptop phone. It also features a woman swinging her hips, with "NLEVILLE" (a reference to Nelly's album Nellyville) printed on her buttocks.

== Charts ==
Chart performance for "It's Getting Hot"
Chart (2023)	Peak position
Canada Hot 100 (Billboard)	82
New Zealand Hot Singles (RMNZ)	9
US Bubbling Under Hot 100 (Billboard)	8
US Hot R&B/Hip-Hop Songs (Billboard)	36
US Rhythmic Airplay (Billboard)	18

== Certifications ==
Certifications for "It's Getting Hot"
Region	Certification	Certified units/sales
United States (RIAA)	Gold	500,000^{‡}
^{‡} Sales+streaming figures based on certification alone.
