= Kant Nobody =

2023 single by Lil Wayne featuring DMX

Single by Lil Wayne featuring DMX

from the album I Am Music
- Released: February 23, 2023
- Length: 3:00
- Label: Young Money; Republic
- Songwriters: Dwayne Carter, Jr.; Earl Simmons; Kasseem Dean; Avery Chambliss; Marvin Gaye; Joshua Berkman; Byran Montesano; Jermaine Preyan
- Producers: Swizz Beatz; Avenue Beatz

Lil Wayne singles chronology
"Miss My Dawgs" (2022)	"Kant Nobody" (2023)	"Ain't Gonna Answer" (2023)

DMX singles chronology
"Know What I Am" (2022)	"Kant Nobody" (2023)	"This Is the Way" (2024)

Music video
- "Kant Nobody" on YouTube

"Kant Nobody" is a song by American rapper Lil Wayne, released on February 23, 2023. The song, which features sampled vocals from late fellow American rapper DMX, was produced by Swizz Beatz and Avenue Beatz. It was included on Lil Wayne's first greatest hits album I Am Music.

== Background ==
In an interview with Zane Lowe on Apple Music 1, Lil Wayne hinted he made the song in reaction to his inclusion on Billboard's list of the "Top 50 Greatest Rappers of All Time" (at number 7).

== Composition ==
"Kant Nobody" begins with a sample of DMX speaking in an interview, before a sample of "Niggaz Done Started Something" from DMX's album It's Dark and Hell Is Hot is played throughout the track. In the chorus, Lil Wayne raps about his lyrical skill and legacy while referencing the process of composing the song: "Best rapper, ex-trapper, dress dapper / Swizzy gave me a head-banger, a neck-snapper / X-factor, make a rapper an example / All I need is a beat with a DMX sample".

== Critical reception ==
Aron A. of HotNewHipHop gave the song a "Very Hottttt" rating and wrote, "...Lil Wayne delivers one of his best performances in a minute. While Wayne delivers one of his best verses in a minute, the song, unfortunately, limits DMX's contributions to a sample instead of a full 16 bars. Still, Lil Wayne and Swizz continue to shine as collaborators following the release of 'Uproar.'"

== Charts ==
Chart performance for "Kant Nobody"
Chart (2023)	Peak position
US Billboard Hot 100	66
US Hot R&B/Hip-Hop Songs (Billboard)	23
