= Prêmio Jovem Brasileiro 2025 =

2025 award ceremony

2025 Prêmio Jovem Brasileiro
- Date: September 23, 2025
- Location: AquaRio; Rio de Janeiro, Brazil
- Hosted by: Blogueirinha; Guto Melo; Vanessa Bellini
- Website: Official page

Television/radio coverage
- Network: BandPlay; Band.com.br; YouTube (Band Entretê)
- Produced by: Agência Zapping

The Prêmio Jovem Brasileiro 2025 will mark the 24th edition of the event, held at AquaRio in the city of Rio de Janeiro, Brazil. The ceremony will be hosted by actress and comedian Blogueirinha, alongside the award's creator Guto Melo and influencer Vanessa Bellini. The event will be broadcast across platforms from the Grupo Bandeirantes de Comunicação, including the BandPlay streaming service, Band.com.br, and the Band Entretê channel on YouTube.

== Winners and nominees ==
The nominations were announced on July 27, 2025. Winners are listed first and highlighted in bold.

Best Female Singer	Best Male Singer
**Simone Mendes**; Ana Castela; Zaynara; Lauana Prado; Luísa Sonza	**Zé Felipe**; João Gomes; Luan Santana; Gustavo Mioto; Biel
Duo of the Year	Band of the Year
**Henrique & Juliano**; **Maiara & Maraisa**; Jonatha & Cristiano; Danilo & Davi; Guilherme & Benuto	**Menos é Mais**; Jovem Dionisio; Sorriso Maroto; QuatroK; Lagum
Music of the Year	Best Male New Artist
**Eu Vou Na Sua Casa — Felipe Amorim**; Romeo — Anitta; Fiu Fiu — Bruno Rosa, Israel & Rodolffo; Saudade Proibida — Simone Mendes; Não Era Love — Luan Pereira, MC Tuto, O Grelo	**Matheus Torres**; MC Pedrinho; Léo Foguete; Luan Alencar; MC Paiva
Best Female New Artist	Best Host
**Unna X**; Mel Summers; Lauana Prado; Taty Girl; Ana Castela	**Virginia Fonseca**; **Luciano Huck**; Sabrina Sato; Patricia Abravanel; Celso Portiolli
Best Actor	Best Actress
**Isaac Amendoim**; Gianlucca Mauad; Pedro Novaes; Guilherme Tavares; Cauã Reymond	**Maísa**; Amanda Simão; Priscila Reis; Mel Summers; Larissa Manoela
Entertainment TV Show	Best Reality Show Constest
**BBB 25**; Domingo Legal; Sabadou com Virgínia; Lady Night; Programa do Ratinho	**Renata Saldanha**; Vitória Strada; Matheus Torres; Davi Brito; Guilherme Vilar
TV Show, TV Series, or Soup Opera	Influencer of the Year
**Domingão com Huck**; Sabadou com Virgínia; A Caverna Encantada; Dona de Mim; Eita Lucas!	**Mari Menezes**; Key Alves; Teddy; Priscila Reis; Carlinhos Maia
Influencer of Humor	Influencer of Beauty
**Brino**; Jacques Vanier; Álvaro; BomTalvão; Uai Lázaro	**Camila Pudim**; Brunna Gonçalves; Bianca Andrade - Boca Rosa; Dayane Santos; Camilla de Lucas
Diversity and Inclusion	Best YouTuber
**PequenaLo**; Paola Antonini; Liniker; Caio e Luan; Fernando Fernandes	**Camila Loures**; Rafa e Luiz; Enaldinho; Felipe Neto; Jaqueline Sobrinho
Best Podcast	King of the Internet
**PodCats**; Cavecast TV Zyn; Podpah; Os Nordestinos Pelo Mundo; Queijo com Goiabada	**Lucas Guimarães**; Leo Foguete; João Ferreira; Davi Brito; Carlinhos Maia
Queen of the Internet	Best YouTube Channel
**Virginia Fonseca**; Gkay; Renata Saldanha; Priscila Reis; Vanessa Lopes	**Camila Loures**; Kisha & Mine; Batom Atrevido - Camila Pudim; Felipe Neto; Rafa & Luiz
Best TikToker	Youth of the Future
**Priscila Reis**; Irmãs Pina; Isabelle Nogueira; Camila Loures; Antonella Braga	**Mel Summers**; Lorena Queiroz; Guilherme Tavares; Juju Penido; Miguel Soares
On The Style	Best Gamer
**Gkay**; Larissa Manoela; Bruna Marquezine; João Guilherme; Gabriela Loures	**Nobru**; **Cherryrar**; Coringa; Mary Games; Julia MineGirl
Digital Breakthrough	Best Fandom
**Priscila Buiar**; Renata Saldanha; Bruna Biancardi; Mari Yumi; Sofia Fornazari	**Renata Saldanha**; **Guilherme Vilar**; Reikes; Bandidas da Buiar; Família Loures; Chaveirinhos; Carrinhos
My Crush	Best Ship
**Davi Brito**; **Ana Castela**; Jão; Priscila Buiar; Key Alves	**Caio Cerqueira & Luan Alencar**; Renata & Maike; Aila Loures & Pedro Thomáz; Key Alves & Bruno Rosa; Nobru & Inhui
Best Concert
**Ana Castela**; **Luan Santana**; Maiara & Maraisa; Alok; Anitta
