= Yasmin Brunet =

Brazilian model (born 1988)

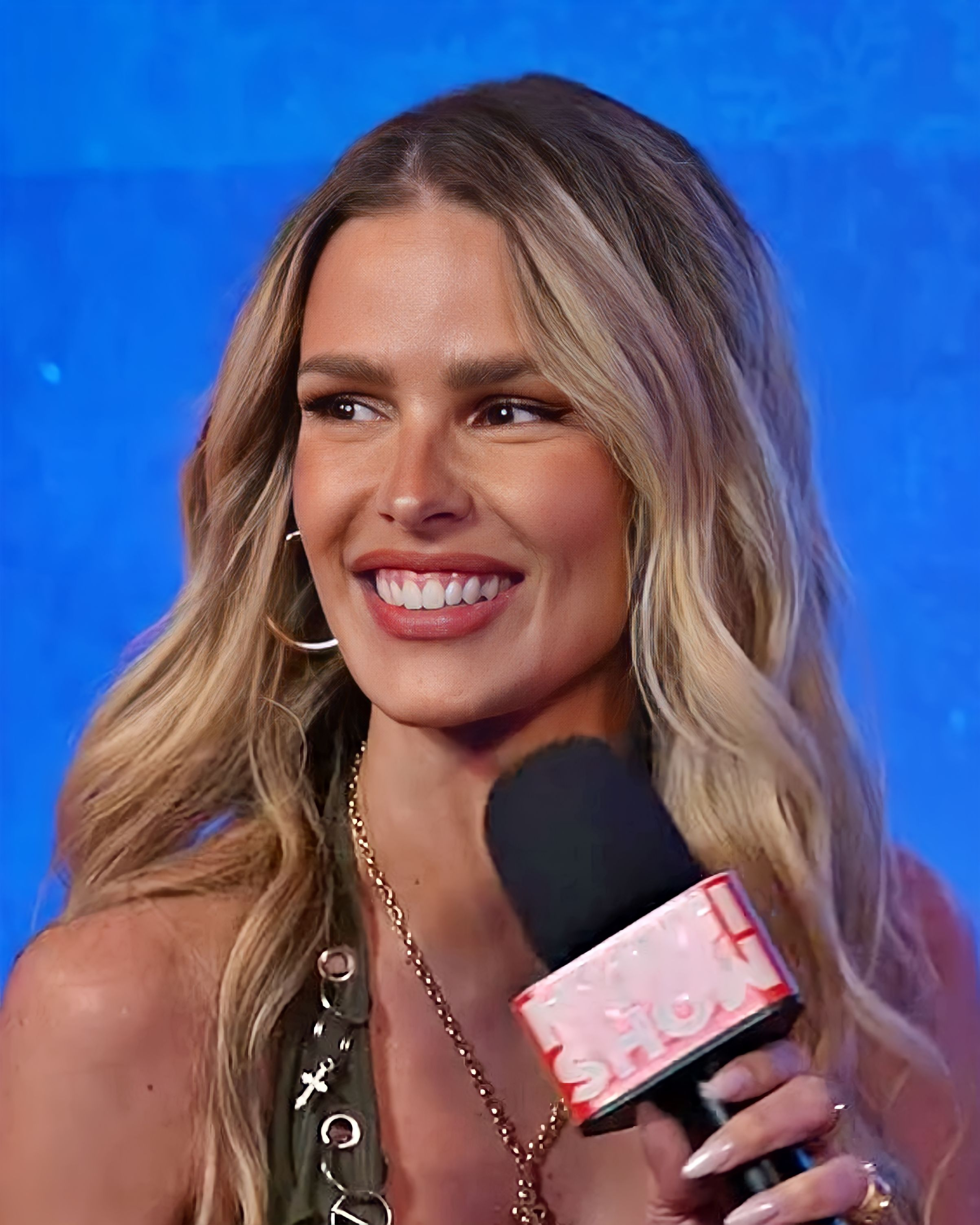
- Brunet in 2024
- Born: Yasmin Botelho Fernandez; 6 June 1988 (age 38); Rio de Janeiro, Brazil
- Occupations: Model; actress
- Spouses: Evandro Soldati (m. 2012; div. 2020) Gabriel Medina (m. 2020; div. 2021)
- Mother: Luíza Brunet
- Modeling information
- Height: 1.73 m (5 ft 8 in)
- Hair color: Blonde
- Eye color: Light brown
- Agency: Ford Models (New York); Models 1 (London); IMG Models (Paris, Milan)

Yasmin Brunet Fernandez (born 6 June 1988), is a Brazilian model, actress and businesswoman.

== Biography ==
Brunet was born in the neighborhood of Gávea, in the city of Rio de Janeiro, Brazil. Her father, Armando Fernandez, is an Argentine businessman and her mother, Luíza Brunet, is a Brazilian model. She owns a home in Ipanema.

== Filmography ==
=== Television ===
Year	Title	Role	Notes
2015	Verdades Secretas	Stephanie Prates	Season 1, recurring
2024	Big Brother Brasil	Herself (Housemate)	Season 24

== Personal life ==
In July 2012, after about 7 years of dating, she married Brazilian model Evandro Soldati. They divorced in early 2020. In 2020, Brunet married professional surfer Gabriel Medina. They divorced in January 2022.

Brunet is an advocate for animal rights and is also committed to raising awareness about environmentalism, banned substances and humanitarian causes. In May 2016, she revealed to be vegetarian for more than 7 years.

In January 2024, it was announced she is a contestant in the reality show Big Brother Brasil 24. She was the 12th evicted with 80.76% of the votes in an eviction against physical education teacher Lucas Henrique Ferreira and dancer & digital influencer Isabelle Nogueira, finishing in thirteenth place.
