= Big Brother 24 =

Big Brother 24 is the twenty-fourth season of various versions of television show Big Brother and may refer to:

- Big Brother 24, the 2022 edition of the U.S. version
- Big Brother Brasil 24, the 2024 edition of the Brazilian version
