= Evandro Soldati =

Brazilian model

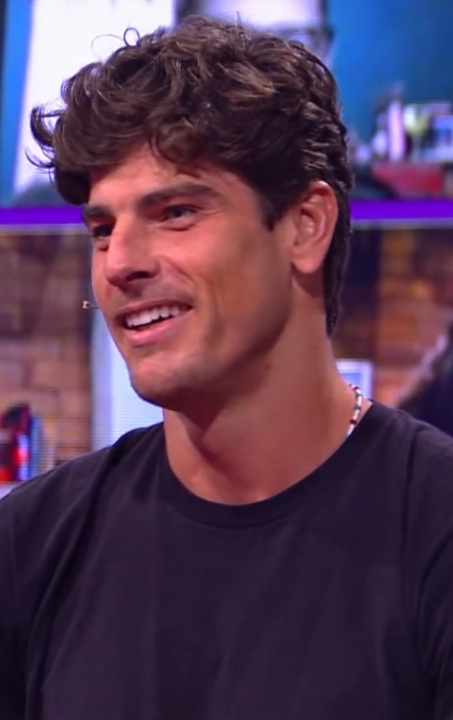
- Soldati in 2021
- Born: 17 April 1985 (age 40); Ubá, Minas Gerais, Brazil
- Occupation: Model
- Years active: 2002–present
- Spouse: Yasmin Brunet (m. 2012; div. 2020)
- Modelling information
- Height: 1.88 m (6 ft 2 in)
- Hair colour: Brown
- Eye colour: Green
- Agency: Ford Models (New York); Bananas Models (Paris); Why Not Model Management (Milan); Next London (London); Sight Management Studio (Barcelona); 2pm Model Management (Copenhagen); Modelwerk (Hamburg); MIKAs (Stockholm)

Evandro Soldati (born 17 April 1985) is a Brazilian model.

== Biography ==
Soldati was born in Ubá, Minas Gerais. He is of Italian descent. Evandro appears in the music video for Lady Gaga's single "Alejandro".

== Career ==
He started modelling in 2002 when his mother signed him up for a Ford contest in his native Brazil. He has since shot onto the current fashion scene by starring in recent campaigns for Louis Vuitton and Valentino. He has also done campaigns for Abercrombie & Fitch, Guess and Dolce & Gabbana. He is also the main male model in the Giorgio Armani ads during 2007 and the 2008 Armani Jeans ad.

In an interview with Globo Magazine, Evandro was quoted as saying that he enjoyed modeling because of its perks the job brought him. He said, "You get to travel the world, and it is always free. You get to know different places, and I have learned English and a bit of Italian as well." In his spare time, Evandro enjoys playing the Brazilian martial art capoeira, and soccer.

He was featured in a 2008 Forbes article as the 7th "most successful male model in the world".

After skipping several fashion weeks in Europe, he returned there for the Dolce & Gabbana fashion show during the Ready-to-wear Autumn/Fall 2010 fashion week.

== Personal life ==
He was married to Brazilian actress and model Yasmin Brunet from 2012 to 2020.
