= MC Binn =

Brazilian singer and composer (born 1993)

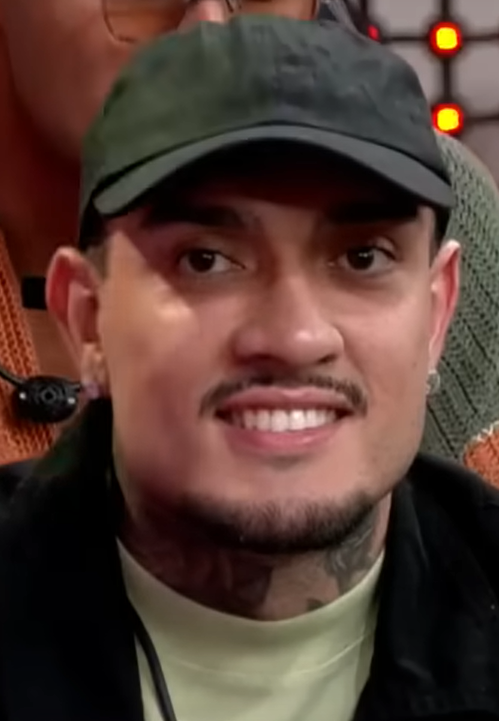
- MC Binn in 2024
- Born: Jefferson Cristian dos Santos Lima; November 1, 1993 (age 33); São Paulo, São Paulo, Brazil
- Other name: MC Bin Laden
- Occupations: Singer; songwriter
- Years active: 2013–present
- Height: 189 cm (6 ft 2 in)
- Musical career
- Genre: Funk ostentação
- Instrument: Vocals
- Labels: Ancient; Kondzilla Records; KL Producer

Jefferson Cristian dos Santos de Lima (Brazilian Portuguese: [ˈʒɛfeʁsõ ˈkɾistʃi.ɐ̃ dus ˈsɐ̃tuz ˈlimɐ]; born November 1, 1993), better known as MC Binn (pronounced [emiˈsi ˈbĩ]) and previously as MC Bin Laden, is a Brazilian singer and composer of funk ostentação.

== Biography ==
MC Binn was raised in Vila Progresso, a neighborhood located in the Itaquera district, in the East Zone of São Paulo. His parents separated when he was nine years old. At the age of 18, he was adopted by pastor Mariza Ventura. Before his fame, Jefferson was a salesman on Rua 25 de Março, and he has said that he only had the money to eat at McDonald's after he started performing.

== Career ==
2014: Home and KL Production

MC Binn was hired by KL Produtora, the agency responsible for promoting several other names in Rio funk, including MC Brinquedo. In mid-2016, MC Binn announced his departure from the producer and joined KondZilla Records.

He gained prominence in the Rio funk scene in São Paulo with the song "Bin Laden Não Morreu", where due to the success of the song, he chose his artistic name "of impact" with reference to Osama bin Laden, the terrorist responsible for the attack on the Twin Towers. In performances, he insisted that the name was a joke and that he does not condone violence.

At the end of 2014, DJ Skrillex included MC Binn's track "Bololo Haha" in his "Skrillex Selects" playlist on SoundCloud. During Skrillex's visit to Brazil for Lollapalooza 2015, together with his friend Diplo, Skrillex and MC Binn released videos together on social media.

2015–2023: "Tá Tranquilo, Tá Favorável" and fame

MC Binn was active in São Paulo funk for at least eight years prior to 2015, with hits such as "O Passinho do Faraó", "Bololo Haha" and "Lança de Coco", a song that talks about drugs – a theme he says abandoned after the overdose death of a friend.

At the end of 2015, with the song "Tá Tranquilo, Tá Favorável", MC Binn gained national notoriety, beyond the São Paulo funk scene, with the dance going viral on social media and adopted by the footballer Neymar to celebrate goals. Lucas Lucco made a new version of the song, mixing the carioca funk of the original song with sections of country music.

On February 17, 2016, he performed on the program Encontro com Fátima Bernardes with the song "Tá Tranquilo, Tá Favorável", which featured choreography by Fátima and Leonardo Veras.

During Lollapalooza 2016 in Brazil, the duo Jack Ü (Skrillex and Diplo) invited MC Binn to come on stage to sing the hit "Tá Tranquilo, Tá Favorável".

On May 17, 2016, it was announced that MC Binn would be on the program for the Warm Up festival, an event held by the Museum of Modern Art in New York City, in the United States. The show was scheduled for July 23, but he was unable to obtain a visa and the performance was cancelled. MC Binn declared that he had already thought about changing his name, as this may have led to the visa being refused.

2024–present: Big Brother Brasil and new stage name

On January 5, 2024, MC Binn was confirmed as one of the participants in the twenty-fourth season of the reality show Big Brother Brasil, as a member of the group "Camarote". MC Binn came seventeenth with 80.34% of the votes on April 4, 2024,against Davi Brito who went on to finish in 8th place. After leaving the reality show, the singer changed his stage name to MC Binn.

== Personal life ==
During an interview, MC Binn says he is evangelical. He gives his younger brother "everything he can have that I couldn't have."

On March 31, 2016, MC Binn began talks to join the Green Party and thus run for councilor in the city of São Paulo, according to his advisor. However, the following day, he said that party membership was nothing more than "a bad joke" and stated that he would rather stay at home "eating cookies" than enter politics. During the same interview, he stated that he only studied until eighth grade.

== Controversies ==
On November 3, 2014, when announcing a show on a social network, the singer said he would "terrorize" Porto Alegre, and posted photos to social media "advocating the use of weapons and drugs." During this show, at the Stuttgart nightclub in Porto Alegre, two armed men allegedly overpowered the security guards at the entrance of the club. Inside, they found members of a rival gang who were already armed, and began an exchange of fire. The shooting left 16 injured and one dead; Tiago Querubim Silveira, 19, was taken to the hospital, but did not survive.

On April 1, 2015, MC Binns' managers sold two shows at the same time, one at Tradição and the other at the Nilópolis. The artist arrived in Nilópolis more than an hour late. The show, scheduled for 4:20am, only started at 5:40am and there was almost no one waiting. The confusion ended at the 57th DP (police station), in Nilópolis, as the producers wanted to receive the remainder of the R$15,000 fee.

In April 2015, the Public Ministry of São Paulo opened an investigation into "strong erotic content and sexual appeals" in songs and choreographies by children and adolescent musicians. MC Binn was on the list of those being investigated for recording inappropriate songs featuring these youths.

== Discography ==
=== Songs ===
==== As main artist ====
Year	Song	Certificated
2014	"Passinho do Faraó"	
2014	"Lança de Coco"	
2014	"12 Calibre"	
2014	"Bololo Haha"	PMB: Platinum
2014	"Barulho do Motor"	
2015	"Tá Tranquilo, Tá Favorável"	PMB: Diamond
2017	"Minha Ex"	
2017	"Os Mlk É 7"	
2017	"Ombrinho com Romano"	
2017	"Famosinha de 1 Milhão de Seguidores"	
2017	"Vuck Vuck da Hornet" (part. MC Hollywood)	
2017	"Avatar"	
2017	"Agrada o Papai" (2017) (part. MC Kekel)	
2017	"Cara de Mau"	
2017	"Oh Pode Crer"	

==== As guest artist ====
Year	Song	Artist	Information
2016	"Tranquilo e Favorável"	Lucas Lucco	The song mixes carioca funk with sections of country music
2018	"BRAZIL"	Tommy Cash	Participation in the album ¥€$ by artist Tommy Cash, with a mix of Estonian rap and Rio funk
2018	"Tá Louca"	Deejay Telio & Deedz B	
2018	"São Paulo"	Rkomi feat. Night Skinny	From the album Ossigeno, the track is a mix of Italian trap and Brazilian funk
2019	"Pa' Llamar Tu Atención"	C. Tangana & Alizzz	
2023	"Controllah"	Gorillaz	

== Filmography ==
=== Television ===
Year	Title	Function	Notes	Ref.
2024	Big Brother Brasil	Housemate (8th place)	Season 24	
