= Davi Brito =

Brazilian reality television personality

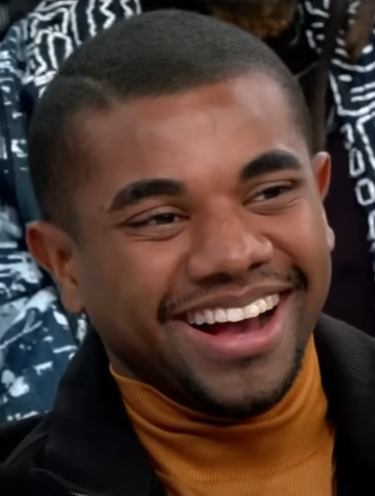
- Brito during the special BBB 24 - The Reunion, on 17 April 2024
- Born: Davi Brito Santos de Oliveira; 24 August 2002 (age 23); Salvador, Bahia, Brazil
- Occupations: Internet celebrity; reality television personality; ridesharing driver
- Years active: 2024–present

Davi Brito Santos de Oliveira (born 24 August 2002) is a Brazilian internet celebrity, former rideshare driver, and reality television personality who gained national recognition after winning the 24th season of Big Brother Brasil (BBB 24) in 2024.

== Early life ==
Davi Brito Santos de Oliveira, born in the Brazilian city of Salvador, capital of the state of Bahia, was born on 24 August 2002. Brito experienced financial hardship from a young age. After his parents divorced during his childhood, his household situation had changed. When his mother's clothing shop closed, he began selling bottled water and popsicles on buses in Salvador at the age of eight to help support the family. Prior to his television debut, he worked as a rideshare driver.

== Career ==
=== Big Brother Brasil ===
Brito entered the Big Brother Brasil (BBB) house, first appearing in the 24th season on 8 January 2024 as part of the "Pipoca" group. At 21 years old, Brito applied for Big Brother Brasil 24 with the goal of improving his family's financial situation and pursuing a medical degree. He stated that his intention was not fame, but to make his mother proud. He gained attention early in the season for surviving multiple elimination rounds and for his willingness to speak openly during conflicts. He was involved in notable disagreements with other housemates, including a confrontation with Rodriguinho and his allies. Throughout the show, Brito used several regional expressions from Bahia that became popular among viewers.

Throughout the show, the program was marked by several controversy involving prejudiced speech by participants. Brito was involved in controversy after stating he was "raised as a man, not a faggot" during a heated exchange with fellow housemate Nizam Hayek. The comment drew national widespread criticism on social media, with former Big Brother Brasil participant Gilberto Nogueira condemning the phrase as homophobic: "We can't normalize this in 2024". He was also involved in some speeches considered sexist by the public at times, such as when he said that women must put themselves in their place to be respected by men. At one point, he considered quitting the show due to psychological pressure, but after a conversation with the show's psychologists, he decided to stay.

Brito won the competition on 16 April 2024, receiving 60.52% of the votes in the final round, surpassing Matteus Amaral (24.50%) and Isabelle Nogueira (14.98%). He earned a prize of R$2,920,000, the largest in the show's history at the time. In total, the final vote received over 259 million votes. Additionally, a documentary series titled Davi, Um Cara Comum da Bahia ("Davi, A Common Guy from Bahia") was released on Globoplay on 8 May 2024, chronicling his life before, during, and after his participation in Big Brother Brasil.

=== Post-show ===
Davi Brito left the show upon winning the competition on 24 April 2024. After his departure, he reportedly lost approximately 10.5 million followers on Instagram, according to Danielos Santa on 3 June 2024. Following his win on Big Brother Brasil, Brito participated in Record's game show Acerte ou Caia, hosted by Tom Cavalcante. The show was filmed in Chile, and Brito was the first contestant to be eliminated early in the competition. During the show, Brito was awarded a scholarship to study medicine at Estácio, a private university and sponsor of Big Brother Brasil. He was nominated for the scholarship by fellow contestant Wanessa Camargo during a sponsored segment.

Upon entering the show, Brito dated, at the time, 41-year-old Mani Rêgo while he was a 21-year-old. The age difference with his then-girlfriend caused criticism inside the house and ageist attacks outside of it. Rêgo later described their relationship as "affectionate and supportive", but their relationship ended shortly after the show ended. The day after his Big Brother Brasil victory, Davi appeared on Mais Você and, in an interview with Ana Maria Braga, stated he was "getting to know" Rêgo. The remark worsened tensions in their already strained relationship, which had been impacted by conflicts between Rêgo and Davi's family. Brito was involved in a legal dispute with Mani Rêgo who sought recognition of a common-law marriage to claim a portion of his Big Brother Brasil winnings. Brito countered by presenting bank statements indicating that financial transactions between them were repayments for a vehicle rental, not evidence of a shared household.

His colloquial expressions from the show such as "calma, calabreso"—a phrase previously coined by comedian Toninho Tornado—have gained temporary traction among viewers and on social media. Tornado told that the term calabreso is a form of playful teasing, altering feminine nouns by changing the final letter a of certain words to o. Davi was unable to provide a detailed explanation of the term's meaning, leading to confusion in the house, with some participants questioning whether it could be interpreted as a fatphobic insult.

== Personal life ==
Davi Brito has a mother called Elisângela and a sister called Raquel. At the time he entered the show, Brito was in a relationship with 41-year-old Mani Rêgo, while he was 21 years old. Their relationship ended after the show ended. In November 2024, Brito was diagnosed with thyroid inflammation, leading him to pause his online cooking series, Tempero do Davi, to focus on his health. On 8 April 2025, he announced that his girlfriend, Adriana Paula, is expecting their first child, expressing his commitment to fatherhood. Subsequently, his relationship with Paula had ended shortly after he publicly disclosed her pregnancy without her prior consent. He explained that both Paula and her family were displeased with the public announcement, which contributed to the breakup.
