= Big Brother Brasil 24 =

Season of television series

- Season 24
- Hosted by: Tadeu Schmidt
- No. of days: 100
- No. of housemates: 26
- Winner: Davi Brito
- Runner-up: Matteus Amaral
- Companion shows: Rede BBB; A Eliminação
- No. of episodes: 100

Release
- Original network: TV Globo; Multishow; Globoplay
- Original release: January 8 – April 16, 2024

Season chronology
- ← Previous; Big Brother Brasil 23 Next → Big Brother Brasil 25

Big Brother Brasil 24 (Note: commonly abbreviated to BBB 24.) was the twenty-fourth season of Big Brother Brasil, which premiered on Monday, January 8, 2024, on TV Globo. The show was produced by Globo and hosted by Tadeu Schmidt, who returned for his third season as the host.

This season had 100 days of confinement, tied with the 21st, 22nd and 23rd as the longest seasons of the reality show ever shown.

For the first time, the grand prize is R$ 2.92 million without tax allowances, the biggest prize in the history of the series, and a 2025 Chevrolet Trailblazer car, plus a R$150,000 prize offered to the runner-up and a R$50,000 prize offered to the housemate in third place.

Like the previous seasons, the show features housemates divided into two groups: "Celebrities", composed of actors, singers, athletes and social media personalities, and "Civilians", composed of everyday Brazilians. A third group consisting of a second batch of civilians called the "Annexes" was introduced as part of the season's opening twist where of 14 hopefuls (including one of who left during the voting process), 8 entered the house, bringing the total number of housemates to a record breaking number of 26 housemates.

On April 16, 2024, 21 year-old app driver Davi Brito won the competition with 60.52% of the public vote over agricultural engineering student Matteus Amaral and dancer & digital influencer Isabelle Nogueira. In addition, the winner received a documentary about his life, produced by Globoplay.

== The game ==
=== The house ===
The twenty-fourth season of Big Brother Brasil presents a remodeled house inspired by fairy tales and fiction stories. The rooms incorporate magical elements, such as a clock that serves as a withdrawn button, a bathroom themed after a wishing well, and a Diary Room that transforms into a magical winter garden. The Have-Not and Have kitchens have distinct decorations, reminiscent of a medieval tavern and combining modernity with optical illusions, respectively. In addition to the traditional three bedrooms, the house also has an extra room on the second floor, with magical and astronomical decor. The outdoor area simulates an enchanted forest divided between day and night. The gym features stone decorations, torches, and war trophies. The house aims to create a fantastic atmosphere, incorporating elements from various imaginary universes.

=== Mesacast BBB ===
The twenty-fourth season of the show features a videocast as a new addition Every day of the week, Mesacast BBB will bring together a team of influencers and TV hosts to discuss the happenings in the most watched house in Brazil Simultaneously aired on Globoplay and Multishow, the show is hosted by Ana Clara, Nany People, Vitor DiCastro, Jojo Todynho, Ed Gama, Mari Gonzalez, Henrique Lopes, Thamirys Borsan, Guto TV, and Pequena Lo.

=== Final prize change throughout the season ===
Just like the previous season, the grand prize will be undetermined until the end of the season but this time, the prize starts at R$0 and increases over the weeks through the evicted housemates spinning a roulette wheel with different values.

Week		Sum of money	Nominated	Evicted	Cash bonus	Remaining prize
1	Day 4	R$0	Giovanna; Maycon; Yasmin	Maycon	(none)	R$0
1	Day 7	R$0	Davi; Juninho; Thalyta	Thalyta	(none)	R$0
1	Day 9	R$0	Beatriz; Davi; Pizane	Pizane	R$250.000	R$250.000
2	Day 14	R$250.000	Nizam; Pitel; Raquele	Nizam	(none)	R$250.000
2	Day 16	R$250.000	Alane; Luigi; Marcus; Pitel; Vinícius	Vinícius	R$50.000	R$300.000
3		R$300.000	Alane; Isabelle; Juninho; Luigi	Luigi	R$250.000	R$550.000
4		R$550.000	Alane; Beatriz; Isabelle; Juninho	Juninho	R$200.000	R$750.000
5		R$750.000	Davi; Isabelle; Marcus	Marcus	R$100.000	R$850.000
6		R$850.000	Deniziane; Fernanda; Matteus	Deniziane	R$200.000	R$1.050.000
7		R$1.050.000	Fernanda; Lucas; Rodriguinho	Rodriguinho	R$350.000	R$1.400.000
8		R$1.400.000	Alane; Davi; Michel	Michel	R$250.000	R$1.650.000
9		R$1.650.000	Isabelle; Lucas; Yasmin	Yasmin	R$0	R$1.650.000
10		R$1.650.000	Alane; Beatriz; Raquele	Raquele	R$300.000	R$1.950.000
11		R$1.950.000	Bin Laden; Davi; Leidy Elin; Matteus	Leidy Elin	R$250.000	R$2.200.000
12	Day 84	R$2.200.000	Beatriz; Fernanda; Giovanna	Fernanda	(none)	R$2.200.000
12	Day 86	R$2.200.000	Alane; Beatriz; Pitel	Pitel	R$220.000	R$2.420.000
13	Day 88	R$2.420.000	Bin Laden; Davi	Bin Laden	(none)	R$2.420.000
13	Day 91	R$2.420.000	Alane; Davi; Giovanna	Giovanna	(none)	R$2.420.000
13	Day 93	R$2.420.000	Alane; Isabelle; Lucas	Lucas	R$0	R$2.420.000
14	Day 95	R$2.420.000	Beatriz; Davi; Isabelle	Beatriz	(none)	R$2.420.000
14	Day 98	R$2.420.000	Alane; Isabelle; Matteus	Alane	R$500.000	R$2.920.000
Finale		Jackpot				R$2.920.000

=== Revised voting system ===
Starting this season, several changes were made regarding the public vote. In addition to having unlimited votes online, named "Fan Vote", the viewers would have the option to vote only once on a separate platform, using their CPF, where they would only be allowed to cast one vote per round. Each of these systems would have a weighted average of 50% in the final result of the vote.

During the first portion of the game, viewers would vote to save nominees from eviction, where the housemate receiving the fewest votes to save would be evicted each round. However, in the second phase of the show, the "vote to evict" voting system would be brought back like the previous seasons.

=== Three groups ===
The dynamics of the season followed the model introduced in Big Brother Brasil 20, mixing housemates into two groups. In addition to the camarote (celebrity) and pipoca (civilian) groups, the puxadinho (annex) also entered as part of the cast.

=== Expanded HoH privileges ===
Along with the typical duties of the Head of Household, the HoH will allow in "Control Center" extra Monster Punishment taps to be triggered, albeit in a limited way.

Through the "HoH Pursuer" function, he will be able to find out who was the housemate who most tried to put him on the eviction. Finally, every week, the public will choose an emoji in the "HoH Poll" to define leadership performance: doubtful, hidden, alert, difficult, lucky, bold or ninja.

=== Larger cast ===
In addition to the 18 housemates selected by production, an additional 14 (later 13) potential housemates were revealed a day before the show's premiere. Viewers were asked to vote two of them (1 man and 1 woman) into the game, while another 6 would be selected by the housemates already in the House during premiere night. As a result, 26 housemates would participate in the season.

=== Expanded Power of Immunity powers ===
In addition to the winner of the Power of Immunity competition having the power to grant one housemate safety for the week, they would also be immune from eviction.

=== Big Sincere ===
In the season, the "Discord Game" gave way to a new activity: Big Sincere. Shown live every Monday, the activity involved only the protagonists of the week: the HoH, the PoI holder and those nominated for eviction.

The host will ask questions based on the themes drawn by the housemates during the panel. The other housemates remain inside the house and watch on the living room screen. If the named participant is among the protagonists of the week, there is the right to reply.

=== The HoH's Crosshairs ===
After the result of the HoH's competition, the winner of the competition will perform "The HoH's Crosshairs" twist, handing out a number of wristbands to housemates in the house. The HoH will be required to choose his nomination for eviction among the housemates who received the bracelet.

Week		HoH(s)	Chosen housemates	Nominated
1	Day 4	Rodriguinho	Beatriz; Davi; Isabelle	Davi
2	Day 11	Matteus	Juninho; Nizam; Pitel; Raquele	Pitel
3		Bin Laden	Davi; Isabelle; ~~Rodriguinho~~; Wanessa	Isabelle
4		Fernanda	Alane; Beatriz; ~~Deniziane~~; Yasmin	Beatriz
5		Lucas	Davi; Deniziane; Fernanda; Isabelle	Davi
6		Raquele	Alane; Deniziane; Matteus	Deniziane
7		Beatriz	Fernanda; ~~Giovanna~~; ~~Michel~~; Rodriguinho	Rodriguinho
8		Lucas	Alane; ~~Davi~~; Isabelle; Michel	Michel
9		Beatriz	Fernanda; Giovanna; ~~Pitel~~; Raquele; Yasmin	Yasmin
10		Giovanna	Alane; Beatriz; Bin Laden; Davi; ~~Matteus~~	Beatriz
11		Giovanna	Alane; Davi	Davi
12	Day 81	Pitel	Beatriz; ~~Matteus~~	Beatriz

=== Joker Power ===
Each week, before the house groceries purchases, an advantage or twist of some kind will be offered to all housemates, who can then bid for it in the Diary Room using their in-game currencies, if they wish so. The results will then be displayed to the whole House, with the housemate who entered the Diary Room and bid for the advantage first being the winner, in the event of a tie. The housemates are allowed to share, omit or lie regarding any details related to the bid.

Starting this season, through the "Lose and Win" twist, the housemates will enter the Diary Room with the amount of bids they have accumulated, but the value will change unpredictably. Initially, there will be a quick game of luck, the result of which may be the addition or loss of stakes. After that, knowing the new balance, they can decide if they want to participate in the auction.

Week	Power	Bidders				Winner	Description
Week	Power	Housemate	Remaining amount	Lose and Win	Final bids	Winner	Description
6	Immunity	Bin Laden	2530	500	3030	Bin Laden	The winner of this power would receive immunity for the week. They would only be told of this fact on Sunday, during nominations.
6	Immunity	Pitel	2010	800	2110	Bin Laden	The winner of this power would receive immunity for the week. They would only be told of this fact on Sunday, during nominations.
6	Immunity	Rodriguinho	2550	100	2000	Bin Laden	The winner of this power would receive immunity for the week. They would only be told of this fact on Sunday, during nominations.
6	Immunity	Yasmin	1110	500	1600	Bin Laden	The winner of this power would receive immunity for the week. They would only be told of this fact on Sunday, during nominations.
6	Immunity	Lucas	2050	1	1551	Bin Laden	The winner of this power would receive immunity for the week. They would only be told of this fact on Sunday, during nominations.
6	Immunity	Alane	720	800	1400	Bin Laden	The winner of this power would receive immunity for the week. They would only be told of this fact on Sunday, during nominations.
6	Immunity	Davi	2000	800	1200	Bin Laden	The winner of this power would receive immunity for the week. They would only be told of this fact on Sunday, during nominations.
6	Immunity	Wanessa	1400	300	1100	Bin Laden	The winner of this power would receive immunity for the week. They would only be told of this fact on Sunday, during nominations.
6	Immunity	Michel	1450	500	1000	Bin Laden	The winner of this power would receive immunity for the week. They would only be told of this fact on Sunday, during nominations.
6	Immunity	Matteus	2060	300	260	Bin Laden	The winner of this power would receive immunity for the week. They would only be told of this fact on Sunday, during nominations.
6	Immunity	Beatriz	890	800	20	Bin Laden	The winner of this power would receive immunity for the week. They would only be told of this fact on Sunday, during nominations.
6	Immunity	Deniziane	790	1	1	Bin Laden	The winner of this power would receive immunity for the week. They would only be told of this fact on Sunday, during nominations.
7	Power of Nomination	Leidy Elin	1960	800	2760	Leidy Elin	During live nominations on Sunday, the winner of this power would have to nominate a housemate for eviction.
7	Power of Nomination	Matteus	2240	800	2500	Leidy Elin	During live nominations on Sunday, the winner of this power would have to nominate a housemate for eviction.
7	Power of Nomination	Raquele	2380	100	2480	Leidy Elin	During live nominations on Sunday, the winner of this power would have to nominate a housemate for eviction.
7	Power of Nomination	Pitel	2640	100	2240	Leidy Elin	During live nominations on Sunday, the winner of this power would have to nominate a housemate for eviction.
7	Power of Nomination	Rodriguinho	2150	100	2200	Leidy Elin	During live nominations on Sunday, the winner of this power would have to nominate a housemate for eviction.
7	Power of Nomination	Lucas	2081	500	2000	Leidy Elin	During live nominations on Sunday, the winner of this power would have to nominate a housemate for eviction.
7	Power of Nomination	Davi	1930	1	1931	Leidy Elin	During live nominations on Sunday, the winner of this power would have to nominate a housemate for eviction.
7	Power of Nomination	Yasmin	1700	300	1400	Leidy Elin	During live nominations on Sunday, the winner of this power would have to nominate a housemate for eviction.
7	Power of Nomination	Wanessa	1090	500	1000	Leidy Elin	During live nominations on Sunday, the winner of this power would have to nominate a housemate for eviction.
7	Power of Nomination	Bin Laden	680	800	900	Leidy Elin	During live nominations on Sunday, the winner of this power would have to nominate a housemate for eviction.
7	Power of Nomination	Beatriz	870	300	200	Leidy Elin	During live nominations on Sunday, the winner of this power would have to nominate a housemate for eviction.
8	Twice Vote	Pitel	2720	800	3520	Pitel	During Sunday's nominations, the winner of this power would be able to choose vote twice for the same housemate or vote for two different housemates.
8	Twice Vote	Matteus	3000	1	3001	Pitel	During Sunday's nominations, the winner of this power would be able to choose vote twice for the same housemate or vote for two different housemates.
8	Twice Vote	Lucas	2641	500	2900	Pitel	During Sunday's nominations, the winner of this power would be able to choose vote twice for the same housemate or vote for two different housemates.
8	Twice Vote	Bin Laden	1740	800	2540	Pitel	During Sunday's nominations, the winner of this power would be able to choose vote twice for the same housemate or vote for two different housemates.
8	Twice Vote	Wanessa	1960	500	1460	Pitel	During Sunday's nominations, the winner of this power would be able to choose vote twice for the same housemate or vote for two different housemates.
8	Twice Vote	Alane	860	300	1160	Pitel	During Sunday's nominations, the winner of this power would be able to choose vote twice for the same housemate or vote for two different housemates.
8	Twice Vote	Yasmin	840	300	540	Pitel	During Sunday's nominations, the winner of this power would be able to choose vote twice for the same housemate or vote for two different housemates.
8	Twice Vote	Beatriz	580	500	500	Pitel	During Sunday's nominations, the winner of this power would be able to choose vote twice for the same housemate or vote for two different housemates.
9	Absurd Power	Lucas	3870	200	4070	Lucas	During Sunday's nominations, the winner of this power would be able to give immunity to one of the housemates chosen to the "HoH's Crosshairs", before of the Head of Household, was able to make them nomination. In addition, the housemate who received immunity from the holder of this power would also have to nominate a housemate for eviction.
9	Absurd Power	Matteus	3511	1	3512	Lucas	During Sunday's nominations, the winner of this power would be able to give immunity to one of the housemates chosen to the "HoH's Crosshairs", before of the Head of Household, was able to make them nomination. In addition, the housemate who received immunity from the holder of this power would also have to nominate a housemate for eviction.
9	Absurd Power	Raquele	2180	1000	3180	Lucas	During Sunday's nominations, the winner of this power would be able to give immunity to one of the housemates chosen to the "HoH's Crosshairs", before of the Head of Household, was able to make them nomination. In addition, the housemate who received immunity from the holder of this power would also have to nominate a housemate for eviction.
9	Absurd Power	Davi	1690	1000	2690	Lucas	During Sunday's nominations, the winner of this power would be able to give immunity to one of the housemates chosen to the "HoH's Crosshairs", before of the Head of Household, was able to make them nomination. In addition, the housemate who received immunity from the holder of this power would also have to nominate a housemate for eviction.
9	Absurd Power	Leidy Elin	1720	600	2320	Lucas	During Sunday's nominations, the winner of this power would be able to give immunity to one of the housemates chosen to the "HoH's Crosshairs", before of the Head of Household, was able to make them nomination. In addition, the housemate who received immunity from the holder of this power would also have to nominate a housemate for eviction.
9	Absurd Power	Pitel	740	1000	1740	Lucas	During Sunday's nominations, the winner of this power would be able to give immunity to one of the housemates chosen to the "HoH's Crosshairs", before of the Head of Household, was able to make them nomination. In addition, the housemate who received immunity from the holder of this power would also have to nominate a housemate for eviction.
9	Absurd Power	Yasmin	730	600	1330	Lucas	During Sunday's nominations, the winner of this power would be able to give immunity to one of the housemates chosen to the "HoH's Crosshairs", before of the Head of Household, was able to make them nomination. In addition, the housemate who received immunity from the holder of this power would also have to nominate a housemate for eviction.
9	Absurd Power	Alane	1260	1	1261	Lucas	During Sunday's nominations, the winner of this power would be able to give immunity to one of the housemates chosen to the "HoH's Crosshairs", before of the Head of Household, was able to make them nomination. In addition, the housemate who received immunity from the holder of this power would also have to nominate a housemate for eviction.
9	Absurd Power	Beatriz	1880	1200	500	Lucas	During Sunday's nominations, the winner of this power would be able to give immunity to one of the housemates chosen to the "HoH's Crosshairs", before of the Head of Household, was able to make them nomination. In addition, the housemate who received immunity from the holder of this power would also have to nominate a housemate for eviction.
9	Absurd Power	Bin Laden	1420	600	20	Lucas	During Sunday's nominations, the winner of this power would be able to give immunity to one of the housemates chosen to the "HoH's Crosshairs", before of the Head of Household, was able to make them nomination. In addition, the housemate who received immunity from the holder of this power would also have to nominate a housemate for eviction.
10	Power of Immunity Veto	Raquele	4410	100	4510	Raquele	During Sunday's nominations, the winner of this power would be able to cancel the decision of save done by the Power of Immunity holder.
10	Power of Immunity Veto	Matteus	3772	1	3771	Raquele	During Sunday's nominations, the winner of this power would be able to cancel the decision of save done by the Power of Immunity holder.
10	Power of Immunity Veto	Pitel	2340	1	2339	Raquele	During Sunday's nominations, the winner of this power would be able to cancel the decision of save done by the Power of Immunity holder.
10	Power of Immunity Veto	Davi	2670	700	1970	Raquele	During Sunday's nominations, the winner of this power would be able to cancel the decision of save done by the Power of Immunity holder.
10	Power of Immunity Veto	Lucas	1250	100	1350	Raquele	During Sunday's nominations, the winner of this power would be able to cancel the decision of save done by the Power of Immunity holder.
10	Power of Immunity Veto	Bin Laden	2120	1200	10	Raquele	During Sunday's nominations, the winner of this power would be able to cancel the decision of save done by the Power of Immunity holder.
11	Power of No in the Veto Competition	Matteus	3841	900	4741	Matteus	The winner of this power would be able to veto one of the four housemates nominated from competing in the Veto Competition, sending them directly for eviction.
11	Power of No in the Veto Competition	Giovanna	3469	300	3169	Matteus	The winner of this power would be able to veto one of the four housemates nominated from competing in the Veto Competition, sending them directly for eviction.
11	Power of No in the Veto Competition	Leidy Elin	3110	1	3111	Matteus	The winner of this power would be able to veto one of the four housemates nominated from competing in the Veto Competition, sending them directly for eviction.
11	Power of No in the Veto Competition	Pitel	2040	500	2540	Matteus	The winner of this power would be able to veto one of the four housemates nominated from competing in the Veto Competition, sending them directly for eviction.
11	Power of No in the Veto Competition	Davi	1940	1	1939	Matteus	The winner of this power would be able to veto one of the four housemates nominated from competing in the Veto Competition, sending them directly for eviction.
11	Power of No in the Veto Competition	Isabelle	1650	600	1050	Matteus	The winner of this power would be able to veto one of the four housemates nominated from competing in the Veto Competition, sending them directly for eviction.
11	Power of No in the Veto Competition	Lucas	1020	1	1019	Matteus	The winner of this power would be able to veto one of the four housemates nominated from competing in the Veto Competition, sending them directly for eviction.
11	Power of No in the Veto Competition	Bin Laden	970	1	20	Matteus	The winner of this power would be able to veto one of the four housemates nominated from competing in the Veto Competition, sending them directly for eviction.

=== Power of No ===
At the beginning of each week, the previous Head of Household may or may not be given the opportunity to disqualify some housemates from competing in the upcoming HoH competition. Housemates might also be vetoed from competing in HoH by punishments from other competitions or twists.

Week		Previous HoH(s)	Total	Vetoed housemate(s)
1	Day 4	Medical Recommendation	1	Giovanna
4		Medical Recommendation	1	Giovanna
5		Medical Recommendation	1	Giovanna
6		Lucas	1	Davi
7		Medical Recommendation	1	Giovanna
7		Raquele	1	Alane
11		Giovanna	1	Beatriz

=== Big Phone ===
Once in a while, the Big Phone rings, unleashing good or bad consequences on the nomination process for those who decide to answer it.

Week	Housemate	Date	Time (BRT)	Consequences
3	Marcus	January 26, 2024	Friday; 11:10 p.m.	See note 13
4	Davi	February 4, 2024	Sunday; 6:21 p.m.	See note 16
8	Davi	March 1, 2024	Friday; 10:00 a.m.	See note 27
8	Davi	March 1, 2024	Friday; 4:00 p.m.	See note 27
8	Alane	March 2, 2024	Saturday; 7:00 p.m.	See note 27
8	Davi	March 2, 2024	Saturday; 11:30 p.m.	See note 27
8	Davi	March 3, 2024	Sunday; 6:00 a.m.	See note 27
8	Davi	March 3, 2024	Sunday; 5:25 p.m.	See note 27

=== The Counterattack ===
The counterattack is a surprise power given to either the HoH's nominee and/or the House's nominee, in which they have the opportunity to automatically nominate an additional housemate for eviction. While viewers are informed when the power will be featured in advance (on Thursdays before the Head of Household competition even takes place), the housemates are only informed about the twist on the spot, during Sunday's live nominations.

Week		Housemate	Status	Used on:	Result
1	Day 5	Juninho	House's nominee	Thalyta	See note 6
2	Day 14	Alane	HoH's nominee	Pitel	See note 12
2	Day 14	Vinícius	House's nominee	Marcus	See note 12
2	Day 14	Marcus & Pitel	Counterattack's nominees	Luigi	See note 12
3		Juninho, Luigi & Pitel	Big Phone's nominees	Alane	See note 14
8		Davi	Big Phone's nominee	Yasmin	See note 28
10		Alane, Beatriz, Bin Laden, Davi & Matteus	Chosen of HoH's Crosshairs	Raquele	See note 35
11		Matteus	House's first nominee	Bin Laden	See note 36
11		Leidy Elin	House's second nominee	Alane	See note 36
12	Day 82	Alane	House's second most voted	Giovanna	See note 38
14	Day 93	Davi	House's nominee	Beatriz	See note 43

== Housemates ==
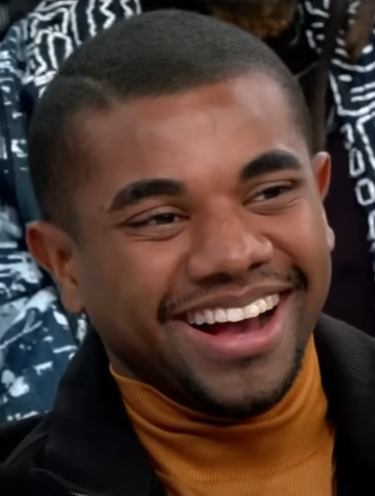
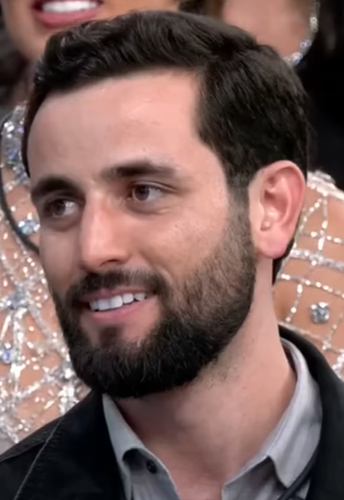
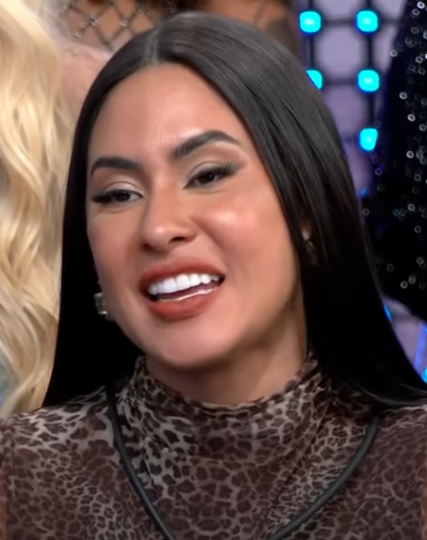
Davi Brito (Winner), Matteus Amaral (Runner-up) and Isabelle Nogueira (Third place), the finalists of Big Brother Brasil 24.

On April 21, 2023, TV Globo announced that applications for the twenty-fourth season of the show were open, during the broadcast of Big Brother Brasil 23, with spots divided by regions of Brazil. On July 10, there was a specific reopening for the Southeast region, ending on the same day.

The cast of 18 official housemates was unveiled on January 5, 2024, during breaks in TV Globo programming and on Gshow.

Rebeca Mota, a 27 year-old dentist from São Paulo, was scheduled to be announced as one of the 14 potential housemates, however, she voluntarily left during the sequester period on January 6 and was not replaced.

On January 7, during the Fantástico show, 13 more candidates were revealed. Among them, the public chose one man and one woman (Davi Brito and Isabelle Nogueira) to officially enter the game, while the house chose another six, three men (Juninho Silva, Lucas Henrique Ferreira and Michel Nogueira) and three women (Raquele Cardozo, Giovanna Lima and Thalyta Alves), to make up the cast of 26 housemates.

Name	Age	Type	Hometown	Occupation	Day entered	Day exited	Result
Davi Brito	21	Annex	Salvador	App driver	1	100	Winner
Matteus Amaral	27	Civilian	Alegrete	Agricultural engineering student	1	100	Runner-up
Isabelle Nogueira	31	Annex	Manaus	Dancer & digital influencer	1	100	Third place
Alane Dias	24	Civilian	Belém	Ballet dancer & model	1	98	21st Evicted
Beatriz Reis	23	Civilian	Guarulhos	Clothing seller	1	95	20th Evicted
Lucas Henrique Ferreira	29	Annex	Rio de Janeiro	Physical education teacher	1	93	19th Evicted
Giovanna Lima	27	Annex	Belo Horizonte	Nutritionist	1	91	18th Evicted
MC Bin Laden	30	Celebrity	São Paulo	Singer	1	88	17th Evicted
Giovanna Pitel	24	Civilian	Maceió	Social worker	1	86	16th Evicted
Fernanda Bande	32	Civilian	Niterói	Baker & model	1	84	15th Evicted
Leidy Elin Alvarenga	26	Civilian	São Gonçalo	Hairdresser & cashier	1	79	14th Evicted
Raquele Cardozo	22	Annex	Conceição da Barra	Confectioner & student	1	72	13th Evicted
Yasmin Brunet	35	Celebrity	Rio de Janeiro	Model & businesswoman	1	65	12th Evicted
Michel Nogueira	30	Annex	Belo Horizonte	Geography teacher	1	58	11th Evicted
Wanessa Camargo	41	Celebrity	Goiânia	Singer	1	55	Ejected
Rodriguinho	45	Celebrity	Bauru	Singer	1	51	10th Evicted
Deniziane Ferreira	29	Civilian	Esmeraldas	Physiotherapist	1	44	9th Evicted
Marcus Vinicius Ferreira	30	Civilian	Belém	Flight atendant	1	37	8th Evicted
Juninho Silva	41	Annex	Rio de Janeiro	Motorcycle taxi driver	1	30	7th Evicted
Lucas Luigi	28	Civilian	Rio de Janeiro	Salesman	1	23	6th Evicted
Vinícius Rodrigues	29	Celebrity	Rosana	Paralympic athlete	1	16	5th Evicted
Nizam Hayek	32	Civilian	São Paulo	International account executive	1	14	4th Evicted
Vanessa Lopes	22	Celebrity	Brasília	Digital influencer	1	12	Walked
Lucas Pizane	22	Civilian	Itaparica	Musician	1	9	3rd Evicted
Thalyta Alves	26	Annex	Belo Horizonte	Lawyer	1	7	2nd Evicted
Maycon Cosmer	35	Civilian	Tijucas	School cook	1	4	1st Evicted
Annexes
Davi Brito	21	Annex	Salvador	App driver	1	1	Selected
Juninho Silva	41	Annex	Rio de Janeiro	Motorcycle taxi driver	1	1	Selected
Michel Nogueira	30	Annex	Belo Horizonte	Geography teacher	1	1	Selected
Lucas Henrique Ferreira	29	Annex	Rio de Janeiro	Physical education teacher	1	1	Selected
Caio Andrade	29	Annex	Salvador	Nutritionist	1	1	Not Selected
Jorge Mateus Viana	31	Annex	Recife	Dentist	1	1	Not Selected
Plínio Simões	30	Annex	Salvador	Jewelry designer	1	1	Not Selected
Isabelle Nogueira	31	Annex	Manaus	Dancer & digital influencer	1	1	Selected
Raquele Cardozo	22	Annex	Conceição da Barra	Confectioner & student	1	1	Selected
Thalyta Alves	26	Annex	Belo Horizonte	Lawyer	1	1	Selected
Giovanna Lima	27	Annex	Belo Horizonte	Nutritionist	1	1	Selected
Carolina Ferreira	27	Annex	Rio de Janeiro	Stylist & model	1	1	Not Selected
Juliana Xavier	27	Annex	Florianópolis	Makeup artist	1	1	Not Selected
Rebeca Mota	27	Annex	São Paulo	Dentist	—		Walked

== Future appearances ==
In 2025, Nizam Hayek appeared on De Férias com o Ex Caribe as original cast member. He then entered A Fazenda 17, where, after 40 days, he was eliminated in 21st place. In 2026, appeared for the second season of De Férias com o Ex Diretoria.

== Voting history ==
Key
– Civilians
– Celebrities
– Annexes

	Week 0	Week 1				Week 2		Week 3	Week 4		Week 5	Week 6	Week 7	Week 8	Week 9	Week 10		Week 11	Week 12		Week 13			Week 14		
	Week 0	Day 1	Day 2	Day 5	Day 7	Day 12	Day 14	Week 3	Face-to-Face	Diary Room	Week 5	Week 6	Week 7	Week 8	Week 9	Face-to-Face	Diary Room	Week 11	Day 82	Day 84	Day 86	Day 89	Day 91	Day 93	Day 96	Finale
Head of Household	(none)		Deniziane	Rodriguinho	Lucas	Matteus	Rodriguinho	Bin Laden	Fernanda		Lucas	Raquele	Beatriz	Lucas	Beatriz	Giovanna		Giovanna	Pitel	Giovanna	Lucas	Lucas	Davi	Matteus	(none)	(none)
Power of Immunity	(none)		(none)	Matteus	(none)	Lucas; Luigi	(none)	Fernanda	Matteus		Michel	Michel	Michel	Pitel	Lucas	Matteus		Pitel	Matteus	(none)	(none)	Matteus	(none)		(none)	(none)
Saved	(none)		(none)	Pizane	(none)	Bin Laden	(none)	Rodriguinho	Deniziane		Giovanna	Michel	Giovanna	Fernanda	Leidy Elin	~~Beatriz~~		Pitel	Matteus	(none)	(none)	Matteus	(none)		(none)	(none)
Joker Power	(none)		(none)	(none)	(none)	(none)	(none)	(none)	(none)			Bin Laden	Leidy Elin	Pitel	Lucas	Raquele		Matteus	(none)	(none)	(none)	(none)	(none)		(none)	(none)
Nomination (Twists)	(none)		(none)	Thalyta	Davi	(none)	Luigi; Marcus; Pitel	Alane; Juninho; Luigi; Pitel	(none)			Lucas	Fernanda; Lucas	Davi; Yasmin	Isabelle; Lucas	Raquele		Alane; Bin Laden	Giovanna	Alane	(none)	(none)	Alane	Beatriz	Alane; Isabelle; Matteus	(none)
Nomination (HoH)	(none)		Maycon	Davi	Beatriz	Pitel	Alane	Isabelle	Beatriz		Davi	Deniziane	Rodriguinho	Michel	Yasmin	Beatriz		Davi	Beatriz	Beatriz	Davi	Giovanna	Lucas	Isabelle	(none)	(none)
Nomination (Housemates)	(none)		Giovanna; Yasmin	Juninho	Pizane	Nizam; Raquele	Vinícius	Davi	Alane; Juninho	Isabelle; Marcus	Fernanda; Isabelle; Marcus; ~~Wanessa~~	Fernanda; Matteus	Bin Laden	Alane	Matteus	Davi	Alane	Leidy Elin; Matteus	Fernanda	Pitel	Bin Laden	Alane; Davi	Isabelle	Davi	(none)	(none)
Veto Players	(none)		(none)					Alane; Davi; Juninho; Luigi; Pitel	Alane; Isabelle; Juninho; Marcus		Fernanda; Isabelle; Marcus	Fernanda; Lucas; Matteus	Bin Laden; Fernanda; Lucas	Alane; Davi; Yasmin	Isabelle; Lucas; Matteus	Beatriz; Davi; Raquele		Alane; ~~Bin Laden~~; Leidy Elin; Matteus	(none)						(none)	(none)
Veto Winner(s)	(none)		(none)					Davi; Pitel	Marcus		Fernanda	Lucas	Bin Laden	Yasmin	Matteus	Davi		Alane	(none)						(none)	(none)
Davi	Annex	Exempt	Rodriguinho	Luigi	Nizam	Nizam; Rodriguinho	Bin Laden	Lucas	Bin Laden	Michel	Fernanda	Fernanda	Bin Laden	Yasmin	Bin Laden	Bin Laden	Bin Laden	Leidy Elin	Fernanda	Pitel	Bin Laden	Isabelle to save	Head of Household	Beatriz	Exempt	Winner (Day 100)
Matteus	Not in House	Thalyta; Michel	Giovanna	Raquele	Davi	Raquele	Juninho	Giovanna	Juninho	Isabelle	Fernanda	Fernanda	Bin Laden	Yasmin	Bin Laden	Bin Laden	Bin Laden	Leidy Elin	Fernanda	Pitel	Bin Laden	Beatriz to save	Isabelle	Davi	Nominated	Runner-up (Day 100)
Isabelle	Annex	Exempt	Matteus	Nizam	Nizam	Nizam; Rodriguinho	Bin Laden	Lucas	Juninho	Wanessa	Fernanda	Matteus	Bin Laden	Bin Laden	Bin Laden	Bin Laden	Lucas	Bin Laden	Fernanda	Pitel	Bin Laden	Davi to save	Matteus	Beatriz	Nominated	Third place (Day 100)
Alane	Not in House	Raquele; Juninho	Giovanna	Pitel	Pizane	Nizam; Raquele	Vinícius	Giovanna	Juninho	Raquele	Fernanda	Fernanda	Bin Laden	Yasmin	Bin Laden	Bin Laden	Bin Laden	Leidy Elin	Fernanda	Pitel	Bin Laden	Beatriz to save	Isabelle	Davi	Nominated	Evicted (Day 98)
Beatriz	Not in House	Raquele; Juninho	Fernanda	Fernanda	Pizane	Vinícius; Nizam	Lucas	Giovanna	Juninho	Michel	Fernanda	Fernanda	Head of Household	Bin Laden	Head of Household	Bin Laden	Bin Laden	Leidy Elin	Fernanda	Pitel	Bin Laden	Alane to save	Isabelle	Davi	Evicted (Day 95)	
Lucas	Annex		Yasmin	Marcus	Pizane	Davi; Alane	Davi	Davi	Isabelle	Giovanna	Isabelle	Fernanda	Davi	Head of Household	Alane	Davi	Alane	Matteus	Alane	Matteus	Head of Household	Head of Household	Matteus	Evicted (Day 93)		
Giovanna	Annex		Pitel	Juninho	Juninho	Nizam; Fernanda	Fernanda	Alane	Alane	Yasmin	Marcus	Wanessa	Wanessa	Alane	Matteus	Head of Household		Head of Household	Alane	Head of Household	Matteus	Isabelle to save	Evicted (Day 91)			
Bin Laden	Not in House	Giovanna; Lucas	Giovanna	Raquele	Raquele	Davi; Marcus	Marcus	Head of Household	Wanessa	Marcus	Wanessa	Fernanda	Davi	Alane	Matteus	Davi	Alane	Matteus	Alane	Matteus	Matteus	Evicted (Day 88)				
Pitel	Not in House	Thalyta; Michel	Giovanna	Raquele	Alane	Marcus; Michel	Marcus	Davi	Alane	Marcus	Marcus	Matteus	Bin Laden	Alane; Alane	Matteus	Davi	Alane	Matteus	Head of Household	Matteus	Evicted (Day 86)					
Fernanda	Not in House	Thalyta; Michel	Giovanna	Alane	Alane	Alane; Giovanna	Isabelle	Alane	Alane	Head of Household	Marcus	Matteus	Bin Laden	Alane	Matteus	Davi	Alane	Matteus	Alane	Evicted (Day 84)						
Leidy Elin	Not in House	Raquele; Juninho	Giovanna	Luigi	Pizane	Rodriguinho; Raquele	Vinícius	Davi	Michel	Rodriguinho	Fernanda	Fernanda	Davi	Bin Laden	Davi	Davi	Isabelle	Matteus	Evicted (Day 79)							
Raquele	Annex		Pitel	Juninho	Davi	Nizam; Deniziane	Deniziane	Alane	Juninho	Wanessa	Marcus	Head of Household	Wanessa	Bin Laden	Matteus	Davi	Alane	Evicted (Day 72)								
Yasmin	Not in House	Giovanna; Lucas	Luigi	Juninho	Marcus	Vinícius; Davi	Bin Laden	Davi	Isabelle	Giovanna	Fernanda	Fernanda	Bin Laden	Alane	Matteus	Evicted (Day 65)										
Michel	Annex		Pitel	Pitel	Nizam	Juninho; Fernanda	Lucas	Alane	Juninho	Isabelle	Marcus	Davi	Bin Laden	Bin Laden	Evicted (Day 58)											
Wanessa	Not in House	Raquele; Juninho	Lucas	Juninho	Davi	Vinícius; Fernanda	Luigi	Davi	Bin Laden	Raquele	Fernanda	Fernanda	Bin Laden	Ejected (Day 55)												
Rodriguinho	Not in House	Thalyta; Michel	Thalyta	Juninho	Davi	Raquele; Davi	Head of Household	Davi	Isabelle	Marcus	Marcus	Davi	Davi	Evicted (Day 51)												
Deniziane	Not in House	Raquele; Juninho	Head of Household	Raquele	Raquele	Vinícius; Nizam	Vinícius	Giovanna	Juninho	Isabelle	Fernanda	Fernanda	Evicted (Day 44)													
Marcus	Not in House	Raquele; Juninho	Bin Laden	Pitel	Pizane	Vinícius; Raquele	Vinícius	Davi	Raquele	Giovanna	Fernanda	Evicted (Day 37)														
Juninho	Annex		Yasmin	Deniziane	Davi	Marcus; Giovanna	Giovanna	Davi	Alane	Marcus	Evicted (Day 30)															
Luigi	Not in House	Giovanna; Lucas	Yasmin	Juninho	Davi	Davi; Beatriz	Davi	Davi	Evicted (Day 23)																	
Vinícius	Not in House	Giovanna; Lucas	Giovanna	Marcus	Michel	Alane; Marcus	Marcus	Evicted (Day 16)																		
Nizam	Not in House	Thalyta; Michel	Yasmin	Raquele	Davi	Isabelle; Raquele	Evicted (Day 14)																			
Vanessa	Not in House	Giovanna; Lucas	Raquele	Thalyta	Alane	Walked (Day 12)																				
Pizane	Not in House	Thalyta; Michel	Raquele	Raquele	Alane	Evicted (Day 9)																				
Thalyta	Annex		Pitel	Juninho	Evicted (Day 7)																					
Maycon	Not in House	Giovanna; Lucas	Yasmin	Evicted (Day 4)																						
Caio	Annex		Evicted (Annex)																							
Carolina	Annex		Evicted (Annex)																							
Jorge Mateus	Annex		Evicted (Annex)																							
Juliana	Annex		Evicted (Annex)																							
Plínio	Annex		Evicted (Annex)																							
Notes	1, 2		1, 3, 4	5, 6	7, 8	9, 10, 11	12	13, 14, 15	16, 17		3, 18, 19, 20	4, 21, 22, 23	24, 25	26, 27, 28, 29	30, 31, 32	33, 34, 35		4, 22, 36, 37	22, 38	39	3	22, 40	41	3, 42, 43	44	45
Nominated for Eviction	Carolina; Giovanna; Isabelle; Juliana; Raquele; Thalyta	Carolina; Giovanna; Juliana; Raquele; Thalyta	Giovanna; Maycon; Yasmin	Davi; Juninho; Thalyta	Beatriz; Davi; Pizane	Nizam; Pitel; Raquele	Alane; Luigi; Marcus; Pitel; Vinícius	Alane; Isabelle; Juninho; Luigi	Alane; Beatriz; Isabelle; Juninho		Davi; Isabelle; Marcus	Deniziane; Fernanda; Matteus	Fernanda; Lucas; Rodriguinho	Alane; Davi; Michel	Isabelle; Lucas; Yasmin	Alane; Beatriz; Raquele		Bin Laden; Davi; Leidy Elin; Matteus	Beatriz; Fernanda; Giovanna	Alane; Beatriz; Pitel	Bin Laden; Davi	Alane; Davi; Giovanna	Alane; Isabelle; Lucas	Beatriz; Davi; Isabelle	Alane; Isabelle; Matteus	Davi; Isabelle; Matteus
Nominated for Eviction	Caio; Davi; Jorge Mateus; Juninho; Lucas; Michel; Plínio	Caio; Jorge Mateus; Juninho; Lucas; Michel; Plínio	Giovanna; Maycon; Yasmin	Davi; Juninho; Thalyta	Beatriz; Davi; Pizane	Nizam; Pitel; Raquele	Alane; Luigi; Marcus; Pitel; Vinícius	Alane; Isabelle; Juninho; Luigi	Alane; Beatriz; Isabelle; Juninho		Davi; Isabelle; Marcus	Deniziane; Fernanda; Matteus	Fernanda; Lucas; Rodriguinho	Alane; Davi; Michel	Isabelle; Lucas; Yasmin	Alane; Beatriz; Raquele		Bin Laden; Davi; Leidy Elin; Matteus	Beatriz; Fernanda; Giovanna	Alane; Beatriz; Pitel	Bin Laden; Davi	Alane; Davi; Giovanna	Alane; Isabelle; Lucas	Beatriz; Davi; Isabelle	Alane; Isabelle; Matteus	Davi; Isabelle; Matteus
Walked	(none)					Vanessa	(none)																			
Ejected	(none)													Wanessa	(none)											
Evicted	Isabelle; 60% to enter	Carolina; Not chosen to enter	Maycon; 9% to save	Thalyta; 23% to save	Pizane; 8% to save	Nizam; 17% to save	Vinícius; 10% to save	Luigi; 7% to save	Juninho; 60% to evict		Marcus; 85% to evict	Deniziane; 52% to evict	Rodriguinho; 78% to evict	Michel; 70% to evict	Yasmin; 81% to evict	Raquele; 87% to evict		Leidy Elin; 88% to evict	Fernanda; 57% to evict	Pitel; 82% to evict	Bin Laden; 80% to evict	Giovanna; 75% to evict	Lucas; 65% to evict	Beatriz; 83% to evict	Alane; 51% to evict	Isabelle; 15% to win
Evicted	Isabelle; 60% to enter	Juliana; Not chosen to enter	Maycon; 9% to save	Thalyta; 23% to save	Pizane; 8% to save	Nizam; 17% to save	Vinícius; 10% to save	Luigi; 7% to save	Juninho; 60% to evict		Marcus; 85% to evict	Deniziane; 52% to evict	Rodriguinho; 78% to evict	Michel; 70% to evict	Yasmin; 81% to evict	Raquele; 87% to evict		Leidy Elin; 88% to evict	Fernanda; 57% to evict	Pitel; 82% to evict	Bin Laden; 80% to evict	Giovanna; 75% to evict	Lucas; 65% to evict	Beatriz; 83% to evict	Alane; 51% to evict	Isabelle; 15% to win
Evicted	Isabelle; 60% to enter	Caio; Not chosen to enter	Maycon; 9% to save	Thalyta; 23% to save	Pizane; 8% to save	Nizam; 17% to save	Vinícius; 10% to save	Luigi; 7% to save	Juninho; 60% to evict		Marcus; 85% to evict	Deniziane; 52% to evict	Rodriguinho; 78% to evict	Michel; 70% to evict	Yasmin; 81% to evict	Raquele; 87% to evict		Leidy Elin; 88% to evict	Fernanda; 57% to evict	Pitel; 82% to evict	Bin Laden; 80% to evict	Giovanna; 75% to evict	Lucas; 65% to evict	Beatriz; 83% to evict	Alane; 51% to evict	Isabelle; 15% to win
Evicted	Davi; 61% to enter	Caio; Not chosen to enter	Maycon; 9% to save	Thalyta; 23% to save	Pizane; 8% to save	Nizam; 17% to save	Vinícius; 10% to save	Luigi; 7% to save	Juninho; 60% to evict		Marcus; 85% to evict	Deniziane; 52% to evict	Rodriguinho; 78% to evict	Michel; 70% to evict	Yasmin; 81% to evict	Raquele; 87% to evict		Leidy Elin; 88% to evict	Fernanda; 57% to evict	Pitel; 82% to evict	Bin Laden; 80% to evict	Giovanna; 75% to evict	Lucas; 65% to evict	Beatriz; 83% to evict	Alane; 51% to evict	Matteus; 24% to win
Evicted	Davi; 61% to enter	Jorge Mateus; Not chosen to enter	Maycon; 9% to save	Thalyta; 23% to save	Pizane; 8% to save	Nizam; 17% to save	Vinícius; 10% to save	Luigi; 7% to save	Juninho; 60% to evict		Marcus; 85% to evict	Deniziane; 52% to evict	Rodriguinho; 78% to evict	Michel; 70% to evict	Yasmin; 81% to evict	Raquele; 87% to evict		Leidy Elin; 88% to evict	Fernanda; 57% to evict	Pitel; 82% to evict	Bin Laden; 80% to evict	Giovanna; 75% to evict	Lucas; 65% to evict	Beatriz; 83% to evict	Alane; 51% to evict	Matteus; 24% to win
Evicted	Davi; 61% to enter	Plínio; Not chosen to enter	Maycon; 9% to save	Thalyta; 23% to save	Pizane; 8% to save	Nizam; 17% to save	Vinícius; 10% to save	Luigi; 7% to save	Juninho; 60% to evict		Marcus; 85% to evict	Deniziane; 52% to evict	Rodriguinho; 78% to evict	Michel; 70% to evict	Yasmin; 81% to evict	Raquele; 87% to evict		Leidy Elin; 88% to evict	Fernanda; 57% to evict	Pitel; 82% to evict	Bin Laden; 80% to evict	Giovanna; 75% to evict	Lucas; 65% to evict	Beatriz; 83% to evict	Alane; 51% to evict	Matteus; 24% to win
Survived	Raquele; 15% to enter	Giovanna; Gray group's choice to enter	Giovanna; 42% to save	Juninho; 25% to save	Beatriz; 29% to save	Pitel; 38% to save	Luigi; 13% to save	Juninho; 12% to save	Alane; 37% to evict		Davi; 12% to evict	Fernanda; 47% to evict	Lucas; 15% to evict	Davi; 29% to evict	Lucas; 17% to evict	Alane; 11% to evict		Davi; 7% to evict	Giovanna; 38% to evict	Alane; 12% to evict	Davi; 20% to evict	Alane; 20% to evict	Alane; 32% to evict	Isabelle; 10% to evict	Isabelle; 47% to evict	Davi; 61% to win
Survived	Giovanna; 8% to enter	Giovanna; Gray group's choice to enter	Giovanna; 42% to save	Juninho; 25% to save	Beatriz; 29% to save	Pitel; 38% to save	Luigi; 13% to save	Juninho; 12% to save	Alane; 37% to evict		Davi; 12% to evict	Fernanda; 47% to evict	Lucas; 15% to evict	Davi; 29% to evict	Lucas; 17% to evict	Alane; 11% to evict		Davi; 7% to evict	Giovanna; 38% to evict	Alane; 12% to evict	Davi; 20% to evict	Alane; 20% to evict	Alane; 32% to evict	Isabelle; 10% to evict	Isabelle; 47% to evict	Davi; 61% to win
Survived	Giovanna; 8% to enter	Thalyta; Brown group's choice to enter	Giovanna; 42% to save	Juninho; 25% to save	Beatriz; 29% to save	Pitel; 38% to save	Luigi; 13% to save	Juninho; 12% to save	Alane; 37% to evict		Davi; 12% to evict	Fernanda; 47% to evict	Lucas; 15% to evict	Davi; 29% to evict	Lucas; 17% to evict	Alane; 11% to evict		Davi; 7% to evict	Giovanna; 38% to evict	Alane; 12% to evict	Davi; 20% to evict	Alane; 20% to evict	Alane; 32% to evict	Isabelle; 10% to evict	Isabelle; 47% to evict	Davi; 61% to win
Survived	Thalyta; 6% to enter	Thalyta; Brown group's choice to enter	Giovanna; 42% to save	Juninho; 25% to save	Beatriz; 29% to save	Pitel; 38% to save	Luigi; 13% to save	Juninho; 12% to save	Alane; 37% to evict		Davi; 12% to evict	Fernanda; 47% to evict	Lucas; 15% to evict	Davi; 29% to evict	Lucas; 17% to evict	Alane; 11% to evict		Davi; 7% to evict	Giovanna; 38% to evict	Alane; 12% to evict	Davi; 20% to evict	Alane; 20% to evict	Alane; 32% to evict	Isabelle; 10% to evict	Isabelle; 47% to evict	Davi; 61% to win
Survived	Thalyta; 6% to enter	Thalyta; Brown group's choice to enter	Giovanna; 42% to save	Juninho; 25% to save	Beatriz; 29% to save	Pitel; 38% to save	Pitel; 17% to save	Juninho; 12% to save	Alane; 37% to evict		Davi; 12% to evict	Fernanda; 47% to evict	Lucas; 15% to evict	Davi; 29% to evict	Lucas; 17% to evict	Alane; 11% to evict		Davi; 7% to evict	Giovanna; 38% to evict	Alane; 12% to evict	Davi; 20% to evict	Alane; 20% to evict	Alane; 32% to evict	Isabelle; 10% to evict	Isabelle; 47% to evict	Davi; 61% to win
Survived	Juliana; 6% to enter	Thalyta; Brown group's choice to enter	Giovanna; 42% to save	Juninho; 25% to save	Beatriz; 29% to save	Pitel; 38% to save	Pitel; 17% to save	Juninho; 12% to save	Alane; 37% to evict		Davi; 12% to evict	Fernanda; 47% to evict	Lucas; 15% to evict	Davi; 29% to evict	Lucas; 17% to evict	Alane; 11% to evict		Davi; 7% to evict	Giovanna; 38% to evict	Alane; 12% to evict	Davi; 20% to evict	Alane; 20% to evict	Alane; 32% to evict	Isabelle; 10% to evict	Isabelle; 47% to evict	Davi; 61% to win
Survived	Juliana; 6% to enter	Raquele; Orange group's choice to enter	Giovanna; 42% to save	Juninho; 25% to save	Beatriz; 29% to save	Pitel; 38% to save	Pitel; 17% to save	Alane; 20% to save	Beatriz; 2% to evict		Davi; 12% to evict	Fernanda; 47% to evict	Lucas; 15% to evict	Davi; 29% to evict	Lucas; 17% to evict	Alane; 11% to evict		Bin Laden; 4% to evict	Giovanna; 38% to evict	Alane; 12% to evict	Davi; 20% to evict	Alane; 20% to evict	Alane; 32% to evict	Isabelle; 10% to evict	Isabelle; 47% to evict	Davi; 61% to win
Survived	Carolina; 5% to enter	Raquele; Orange group's choice to enter	Giovanna; 42% to save	Juninho; 25% to save	Beatriz; 29% to save	Pitel; 38% to save	Pitel; 17% to save	Alane; 20% to save	Beatriz; 2% to evict		Davi; 12% to evict	Fernanda; 47% to evict	Lucas; 15% to evict	Davi; 29% to evict	Lucas; 17% to evict	Alane; 11% to evict		Bin Laden; 4% to evict	Giovanna; 38% to evict	Alane; 12% to evict	Davi; 20% to evict	Alane; 20% to evict	Alane; 32% to evict	Isabelle; 10% to evict	Isabelle; 47% to evict	Davi; 61% to win
Survived	Plínio; 9% to enter	Raquele; Orange group's choice to enter	Giovanna; 42% to save	Juninho; 25% to save	Beatriz; 29% to save	Pitel; 38% to save	Pitel; 17% to save	Alane; 20% to save	Beatriz; 2% to evict		Davi; 12% to evict	Fernanda; 47% to evict	Lucas; 15% to evict	Davi; 29% to evict	Lucas; 17% to evict	Alane; 11% to evict		Bin Laden; 4% to evict	Giovanna; 38% to evict	Alane; 12% to evict	Davi; 20% to evict	Alane; 20% to evict	Alane; 32% to evict	Isabelle; 10% to evict	Isabelle; 47% to evict	Davi; 61% to win
Survived	Plínio; 9% to enter	Lucas; Gray group's choice to enter	Yasmin; 49% to save	Davi; 52% to save	Davi; 63% to save	Raquele; 45% to save	Marcus; 21% to save	Alane; 20% to save	Beatriz; 2% to evict		Isabelle; 3% to evict	Matteus; 1% to evict	Fernanda; 7% to evict	Alane; 1% to evict	Isabelle; 2% to evict	Beatriz; 2% to evict		Bin Laden; 4% to evict	Beatriz; 5% to evict	Beatriz; 6% to evict	Davi; 20% to evict	Davi; 5% to evict	Isabelle; 3% to evict	Davi; 7% to evict	Matteus; 2% to evict	Davi; 61% to win
Survived	Caio; 7% to enter	Lucas; Gray group's choice to enter	Yasmin; 49% to save	Davi; 52% to save	Davi; 63% to save	Raquele; 45% to save	Marcus; 21% to save	Alane; 20% to save	Beatriz; 2% to evict		Isabelle; 3% to evict	Matteus; 1% to evict	Fernanda; 7% to evict	Alane; 1% to evict	Isabelle; 2% to evict	Beatriz; 2% to evict		Bin Laden; 4% to evict	Beatriz; 5% to evict	Beatriz; 6% to evict	Davi; 20% to evict	Davi; 5% to evict	Isabelle; 3% to evict	Davi; 7% to evict	Matteus; 2% to evict	Davi; 61% to win
Survived	Michel; 7% to enter	Lucas; Gray group's choice to enter	Yasmin; 49% to save	Davi; 52% to save	Davi; 63% to save	Raquele; 45% to save	Marcus; 21% to save	Alane; 20% to save	Beatriz; 2% to evict		Isabelle; 3% to evict	Matteus; 1% to evict	Fernanda; 7% to evict	Alane; 1% to evict	Isabelle; 2% to evict	Beatriz; 2% to evict		Bin Laden; 4% to evict	Beatriz; 5% to evict	Beatriz; 6% to evict	Davi; 20% to evict	Davi; 5% to evict	Isabelle; 3% to evict	Davi; 7% to evict	Matteus; 2% to evict	Davi; 61% to win
Survived	Michel; 7% to enter	Michel; Brown group's choice to enter	Yasmin; 49% to save	Davi; 52% to save	Davi; 63% to save	Raquele; 45% to save	Marcus; 21% to save	Isabelle; 61% to save	Isabelle; 1% to evict		Isabelle; 3% to evict	Matteus; 1% to evict	Fernanda; 7% to evict	Alane; 1% to evict	Isabelle; 2% to evict	Beatriz; 2% to evict		Matteus; 1% to evict	Beatriz; 5% to evict	Beatriz; 6% to evict	Davi; 20% to evict	Davi; 5% to evict	Isabelle; 3% to evict	Davi; 7% to evict	Matteus; 2% to evict	Davi; 61% to win
Survived	Jorge Mateus; 7% to enter	Michel; Brown group's choice to enter	Yasmin; 49% to save	Davi; 52% to save	Davi; 63% to save	Raquele; 45% to save	Marcus; 21% to save	Isabelle; 61% to save	Isabelle; 1% to evict		Isabelle; 3% to evict	Matteus; 1% to evict	Fernanda; 7% to evict	Alane; 1% to evict	Isabelle; 2% to evict	Beatriz; 2% to evict		Matteus; 1% to evict	Beatriz; 5% to evict	Beatriz; 6% to evict	Davi; 20% to evict	Davi; 5% to evict	Isabelle; 3% to evict	Davi; 7% to evict	Matteus; 2% to evict	Davi; 61% to win
Survived	Jorge Mateus; 7% to enter	Michel; Brown group's choice to enter	Yasmin; 49% to save	Davi; 52% to save	Davi; 63% to save	Raquele; 45% to save	Alane; 41% to save	Isabelle; 61% to save	Isabelle; 1% to evict		Isabelle; 3% to evict	Matteus; 1% to evict	Fernanda; 7% to evict	Alane; 1% to evict	Isabelle; 2% to evict	Beatriz; 2% to evict		Matteus; 1% to evict	Beatriz; 5% to evict	Beatriz; 6% to evict	Davi; 20% to evict	Davi; 5% to evict	Isabelle; 3% to evict	Davi; 7% to evict	Matteus; 2% to evict	Davi; 61% to win
Survived	Lucas; 6% to enter	Michel; Brown group's choice to enter	Yasmin; 49% to save	Davi; 52% to save	Davi; 63% to save	Raquele; 45% to save	Alane; 41% to save	Isabelle; 61% to save	Isabelle; 1% to evict		Isabelle; 3% to evict	Matteus; 1% to evict	Fernanda; 7% to evict	Alane; 1% to evict	Isabelle; 2% to evict	Beatriz; 2% to evict		Matteus; 1% to evict	Beatriz; 5% to evict	Beatriz; 6% to evict	Davi; 20% to evict	Davi; 5% to evict	Isabelle; 3% to evict	Davi; 7% to evict	Matteus; 2% to evict	Davi; 61% to win
Survived	Lucas; 6% to enter	Juninho; Orange group's choice to enter	Yasmin; 49% to save	Davi; 52% to save	Davi; 63% to save	Raquele; 45% to save	Alane; 41% to save	Isabelle; 61% to save	Isabelle; 1% to evict		Isabelle; 3% to evict	Matteus; 1% to evict	Fernanda; 7% to evict	Alane; 1% to evict	Isabelle; 2% to evict	Beatriz; 2% to evict		Matteus; 1% to evict	Beatriz; 5% to evict	Beatriz; 6% to evict	Davi; 20% to evict	Davi; 5% to evict	Isabelle; 3% to evict	Davi; 7% to evict	Matteus; 2% to evict	Davi; 61% to win
Survived	Juninho; 4% to enter	Juninho; Orange group's choice to enter	Yasmin; 49% to save	Davi; 52% to save	Davi; 63% to save	Raquele; 45% to save	Alane; 41% to save	Isabelle; 61% to save	Isabelle; 1% to evict		Isabelle; 3% to evict	Matteus; 1% to evict	Fernanda; 7% to evict	Alane; 1% to evict	Isabelle; 2% to evict	Beatriz; 2% to evict		Matteus; 1% to evict	Beatriz; 5% to evict	Beatriz; 6% to evict	Davi; 20% to evict	Davi; 5% to evict	Isabelle; 3% to evict	Davi; 7% to evict	Matteus; 2% to evict	Davi; 61% to win
Votes	2,511,102 (Women's vote)	No public vote	9,253,020	7,892,278	30,611,247	13,999,624	13,314,282	18,389,444	41,733,976		35,406,748	97,266,884	32,621,700	224,381,203	76,619,055	69,350,565		81,204,870	98,258,688	32,361,426	64,517,342	39,135,506	35,923,570	80,298,386	187,957,364	259,907,556
Votes	901,171 (Men's vote)	No public vote	9,253,020	7,892,278	30,611,247	13,999,624	13,314,282	18,389,444	41,733,976		35,406,748	97,266,884	32,621,700	224,381,203	76,619,055	69,350,565		81,204,870	98,258,688	32,361,426	64,517,342	39,135,506	35,923,570	80,298,386	187,957,364	259,907,556

=== Notes ===
- ^Note 1: One day before the season premiere, 13 potential housemates were revealed to the public, who began vote for two of them (one man and one woman) to enter the game. Davi and Isabelle received the most votes entered the House and won immunity from the first nominations.
- ^Note 2: On Day 1, the 18 housemates were divided into three groups of six (Brown, Gray and Orange) and each group had to choose by consensus 1 man and 1 woman from the 11 remaining candidates to enter the game. Orange group chose Raquele and Juninho; Brown group chose Thalyta and Michel; Gray group chose Giovanna and Lucas, thus evicting Caio, Carolina, Jorge Mateus, Juliana and Plínio.
- ^Note 3: This round, the housemates voted in Face-to-Face nominations instead of voting in the Diary Room.
- ^Note 4: This round, the top 2 vote recipients became the House's nominees.
- ^Note 5: As Head of Household, Rodriguinho was forced to break the tie between Juninho and Raquele (with six votes each). He nominated Juninho.
- ^Note 6: On Day 5, the House's nominee had the power to name an additional nominee. During the nominations, the housemates nominated Juninho, who in turn nominated Thalyta.
- ^Note 7: As Head of Household, Lucas was forced to break the tie between Alane and Pizane (with four votes each). He nominated Pizane.
- ^Note 8: On Day 7, the HoH Lucas drew six housemates who would each have to ban another housemate from voting. Giovanna banned Nizam, Beatriz banned Rodriguinho, Deniziane banned Juninho, Yasmin banned Luigi, Vinícius banned Raquele and Davi banned Matteus. After the house vote, the six previously banned housemates had to choose, as a group, one housemate to nominate for eviction. They nominated Davi.
- ^Note 9: On Day 12, Vanessa pressed the Withdrawn Button and left the House.
- ^Note 10: On Day 12, the housemates had to vote for two different housemates during nominations. The top 2 vote recipients became the House's nominees.
- ^Note 11: As Head of Household, Matteus was forced to break the tie between Davi, Raquele and Vinícius (with five votes each) to determine the House's second nominee. He nominated Raquele.
- ^Note 12: On Day 14, the HoH's nominee and the House's nominee, respectively, had the power to name an additional nominee each. During the nominations, Rodriguinho, as HoH, nominated Alane, who in turn nominated Pitel. The housemates nominated Vinícius, who in turn nominated Marcus. Furthermore, Pitel and Marcus, as Counterattack's nominees, had the power to name another additional nominee, as a duo. They nominated Luigi.
- ^Note 13: On Day 19, Marcus answered the Big Phone and was awarded immunity and instructed to nominate three housemates for eviction. He chose Juninho, Luigi and Pitel.
- ^Note 14: This week, the Big Phone's nominees had the power to name an additional nominee, as a trio. Before the nominations, Marcus, who answered the Big Phone, nominated Juninho, Luigi and Pitel, who in turn nominated Alane.
- ^Note 15: Week 3 featured the veto competition and it was a double Veto. Of the 5 Veto players, 2 would win a veto and avoid nominations, leaving the other three facing Brazil's vote alongside the HoH's nominee.
- ^Note 16: On Day 28, Davi answered the Big Phone and was awarded immunity and instructed to divide the house into two groups of nine. These groups were used for the week's nominations, with two rounds of voting that would determine four House's Nominees. The first round of voting was a Face-to-Face vote where one was required to vote for one person on the opposing group, while the second was a private Diary Room vote, with housemates voting for one person from the same group. The housemate with the most votes in each group of voting was nominated.
- ^Note 17: As Head of Household, Fernanda was forced to break the tie on the Face-to-Face vote between Alane and Isabelle (with three votes each) to determine the first group's nominee. She nominated Alane.
- ^Note 18: This week, the top 4 vote recipients became the House's nominees.
- ^Note 19: As Head of Household, Lucas was forced to break the tie between Alane, Beatriz, Bin Laden, Deniziane, Isabelle, Leidy Elin, Matteus, Pitel, Raquele, Rodriguinho and Yasmin (with zero votes each) to determine the House's fourth nominee. He nominated Isabelle.
- ^Note 20: This week, the HoH had to save one of the House's nominees. After announcing the nominations, Lucas, as HoH, saved Wanessa from the block.
- ^Note 21: As the winner of this week's Joker Power, Bin Laden received immunity for the week. They were only told of this fact during Live Nominations.
- ^Note 22: This week, the winner of the Power of Immunity gained immunity for only themselves, and didn't have to give immunity to anyone else. They were only told of this fact during Live Nominations.
- ^Note 23: As the winner of this week's Power of Immunity, Michel had the power to nominate someone for eviction on Sunday. He nominated Lucas.
- ^Note 24: As one of the duo winners of the HoH competition, Isabelle had the power to choose one housemate to nominate for eviction on Day 49. She nominated Lucas.
- ^Note 25: As the winner of this week's Joker Power, Leidy Elin was required to nominate someone for eviction. She nominated Fernanda.
- ^Note 26: On Day 55, Wanessa was ejected from the House due to violent behaviour towards Davi.
- ^Note 27: This week, Davi (four times) and Alane answered the five Big Phone calls and was given the "missed calls", respectively. On Day 56, Davi answered the sixth call of the Big Phone and was automatically nominated for eviction.
- ^Note 28: As the winner of this week's Joker Power, Pitel was required to vote twice during nominations. She chose to vote twice on Alane.
- ^Note 29: This week, the Big Phone's nominee had the power to name an additional nominee. Before the nominations, Davi answered the Big Phone and was automatically nominated for eviction, and in turn nominated Yasmin.
- ^Note 30: The first four housemates eliminated from Week 9's HoH competition (Lucas, Bin Laden, Yasmin and Alane) would each draw a 'bottle of consequences'. Lucas was automatically nominated for eviction, Bin Laden was vetoed from this week's Power of Immunity competition, Yasmin could't received immunity this week, and Alane automatically became a Have-Not. The 'bottle of consequences' is sovereign. That is, if the housemate who draws the bottle "automatically nominated for eviction" or "could't received immunity this week" wins this week's Power of Immunity, they didn't gained immunity for themselves, and only had to give immunity to anyone else.
- ^Note 31: As the winner of this week's Joker Power, Lucas was required giving immunity to one of the housemates chosen to the "HoH's Crosshairs" (Fernanda, Giovanna, Pitel, Raquele and Yasmin). Only after that, Beatriz, as HoH, was able to make her nomination. He chose Pitel.
- ^Note 32: This week, Pitel, who received immunity by Lucas' Joker Power, had the power to nominate someone for eviction. She nominated Isabelle.
- ^Note 33: As the winner of this week's Joker Power, Raquele had the power to cancel the decision of the Power of Immunity holder or not interfere with the decision. Before the nominations took place, Raquele decided to use her Power of Immunity Veto and canceled the immunity that Matteus, as Power of Immunity holder, chose to give to Beatriz.
- ^Note 34: This week, the housemates had two rounds of voting that would determine two House's nominees. The first round of voting was a Face-to-Face vote where one was required to vote for one of the housemates chosen to the "HoH's Crosshairs", while the second was a private Diary Room vote. The housemate with the most votes in each round of voting was nominated.
- ^Note 35: This week, the housemates chosen to the "HoH's Crosshairs" had the power to name an additional nominee, as a group. Before the nominations, Giovanna, as HoH, chose Alane, Beatriz, Bin Laden, Davi and Matteus to the "HoH's Crosshairs", who in turn nominated Raquele.
- ^Note 36: This week, the House's nominees (the top 2 vote from the house), respectively, had the power to name an additional nominee each. During the nominations, the housemates nominated Matteus, who in turn nominated Bin Laden, and Leidy Elin, who in turn nominated Alane.
- ^Note 37: As the winner of this week's Joker Power, Matteus was required to veto one of the four nominees from competing in this week's Veto competition, thus going straight to Brazil's vote alongside the HoH's nominee. He chose Bin Laden.
- ^Note 38: On Day 82, the second most voted from the house had the power to name an additional nominee. During the nominations, Alane was the second most voted of housemates, and in turn nominated Giovanna.
- ^Note 39: On Day 84, the losing trio from the HoH competition (Alane, Beatriz and Isabelle) would each draw a 'bottle of consequences'. Isabelle received immunity for nominations, Beatriz did not receive any consequences, and Alane was automatically nominated for eviction.
- ^Note 40: On Day 89, the voting housemates cast their vote to save one housemate during nominations. The top 2 least vote recipient became the House's nominees.
- ^Note 41: On Day 91, the first housemate eliminated of the HoH competition was nominated for eviction. Alane was the first eliminated of the competition and was automatically nominated for eviction.
- ^Note 42: As Head of Household, Matteus was forced to break the tie between Beatriz and Davi (two votes each). He nominated Davi.
- ^Note 43: On Day 93, the House's nominee had the power to name an additional nominee. During the nominations, the housemates nominated Davi, who in turn nominated Beatriz.
- ^Note 44: Davi won the final competition, winning immunity for the final eviction and granting his place in the Finale. Alane, Isabelle and Matteus were automatically nominated for eviction by default.
- ^Note 45: For the final, the public will vote for the housemate they want to win Big Brother Brasil 24.

=== Public vote results ===
Week		Housemate	Vote		Average
Week		Housemate	Single	Fan	Average
0 (Annex)		Carolina	6.78%	3.08%	4.93%
0 (Annex)		Giovanna	11.35%	5.03%	8.19%
0 (Annex)		Isabelle	42.57%	77.87%	60.22%
0 (Annex)		Juliana	8.17%	2.99%	5.58%
0 (Annex)		Raquele	21.51%	7.97%	14.74%
0 (Annex)		Thalyta	9.62%	3.06%	6.34%
0 (Annex)		Caio	5.24%	8.70%	6.97%
0 (Annex)		Davi	65.46%	56.43%	60.94%
0 (Annex)		Jorge Mateus	7.17%	5.99%	6.58%
0 (Annex)		Juninho	4.51%	3.03%	3.77%
0 (Annex)		Lucas	4.90%	6.45%	5.68%
0 (Annex)		Michel	4.82%	8.78%	6.80%
0 (Annex)		Plínio	7.90%	10.62%	9.26%
1	Day 4	Giovanna	34.58%	49.83%	42.20%
1	Day 4	Maycon	9.55%	7.36%	8.46%
1	Day 4	Yasmin	55.87%	42.81%	49.34%
1	Day 7	Davi	60.76%	43.54%	52.15%
1	Day 7	Juninho	19.64%	30.64%	25.14%
1	Day 7	Thalyta	19.60%	25.82%	22.71%
1	Day 9	Beatriz	29.48%	27.39%	28.44%
1	Day 9	Davi	62.86%	63.57%	63.21%
1	Day 9	Pizane	7.66%	9.04%	8.35%
2	Day 14	Nizam	18.55%	15.73%	17.14%
2	Day 14	Pitel	30.05%	44.94%	37.49%
2	Day 14	Raquele	51.40%	39.33%	45.37%
2	Day 16	Alane	45.15%	36.53%	40.85%
2	Day 16	Luigi	13.59%	11.45%	12.52%
2	Day 16	Marcus	15.94%	25.57%	20.75%
2	Day 16	Pitel	16.47%	15.46%	15.96%
2	Day 16	Vinícius	8.85%	10.99%	9.92%
3		Alane	17.33%	21.76%	19.55%
3		Isabelle	66.02%	56.01%	61.02%
3		Juninho	8.61%	15.68%	12.14%
3		Luigi	8.04%	6.55%	7.29%
4		Alane	34.16%	39.12%	36.64%
4		Beatriz	2.56%	1.33%	1.95%
4		Isabelle	1.32%	0.79%	1.06%
4		Juninho	61.96%	58.76%	60.35%
5		Davi	10.90%	13.25%	12.07%
5		Isabelle	3.16%	2.98%	3.07%
5		Marcus	85.94%	83.77%	84.86%
6		Deniziane	53.28%	50.75%	52.02%
6		Fernanda	45.35%	48.98%	47.16%
6		Matteus	1.37%	0.27%	0.82%
7		Fernanda	7.48%	6.42%	6.95%
7		Lucas	15.21%	14.42%	14.82%
7		Rodriguinho	77.31%	79.16%	78.23%
8		Alane	1.42%	0.47%	0.94%
8		Davi	28.94%	28.52%	28.73%
8		Michel	69.64%	71.01%	70.33%
9		Isabelle	2.81%	1.99%	2.40%
9		Lucas	18.36%	15.31%	16.84%
9		Yasmin	78.83%	82.70%	80.76%
10		Alane	12.16%	9.71%	10.94%
10		Beatriz	2.47%	1.36%	1.92%
10		Raquele	85.37%	88.93%	87.14%
11		Bin Laden	4.13%	3.56%	3.84%
11		Davi	8.22%	5.30%	6.76%
11		Leidy Elin	86.23%	90.42%	88.33%
11		Matteus	1.42%	0.72%	1.07%
12	Day 84	Beatriz	6.73%	3.39%	5.06%
12	Day 84	Fernanda	53.46%	60.72%	57.09%
12	Day 84	Giovanna	39.81%	35.89%	37.85%
12	Day 86	Alane	13.54%	11.23%	12.38%
12	Day 86	Beatriz	7.31%	3.93%	5.62%
12	Day 86	Pitel	79.15%	84.84%	82.00%
13	Day 88	Bin Laden	75.55%	85.12%	80.34%
13	Day 88	Davi	24.45%	14.88%	19.66%
13	Day 91	Alane	18.14%	21.98%	20.06%
13	Day 91	Davi	6.05%	3.13%	4.59%
13	Day 91	Giovanna	78.73%	71.97%	75.35%
13	Day 93	Alane	31.40%	32.75%	32.08%
13	Day 93	Isabelle	2.87%	3.58%	3.23%
13	Day 93	Lucas	65.73%	63.67%	64.69%
14	Day 95	Beatriz	82.41%	82.81%	82.61%
14	Day 95	Davi	8.44%	6.62%	7.53%
14	Day 95	Isabelle	9.15%	10.57%	9.86%
14	Day 98	Alane	50.21%	52.02%	51.11%
14	Day 98	Isabelle	46.35%	46.97%	46.66%
14	Day 98	Matteus	3.44%	1.01%	2.23%
Finale		Davi	58.38%	62.65%	60.52%
Finale		Isabelle	12.63%	17.33%	14.98%
Finale		Matteus	28.99%	20.02%	24.50%

=== Have and Have-Nots ===
	Week 1			Week 2		Week 3^{1, 2}	Week 4^{2, 3}	Week 5	Week 6	Week 7	Week 8		Week 9^{6}	Week 10	Week 11	Week 12		Week 13				Week 14	
	Day 2	Day 4	Day 7	Day 11	Day 14	Week 3^{1, 2}	Week 4^{2, 3}	Week 5	Week 6	Week 7	Day 53^{4}	Day 59^{5}	Week 9^{6}	Week 10	Week 11	Day 81	Day 84	Day 86	Day 88^{7, 8}		Day 91	Day 93	Day 96
Davi	Have-Not	Have-Not	Have-Not	Have	Have-Not	Have	Have	Have-Not	Have-Not	Have	Have-Not	Have-Not	Have-Not	Have-Not	Have-Not	Have-Not	Have-Not	Have-Not	Have-Not	Have-Not	Have	Have-Not	Have
Matteus	Have	Have	Have	Have	Have-Not	Have-Not	Have-Not	Have-Not	Have-Not	Have	Have-Not	Have-Not	Have	Have-Not	Have-Not	Have-Not	Have-Not	Have-Not	Have-Not	Have-Not	Have-Not	Have	Have
Isabelle	Have-Not	Have-Not	Have-Not	Have	Have-Not	Have-Not	Have-Not	Have-Not	Have	Have	Have-Not	Have-Not	Have	Have-Not	Have-Not	Have-Not	Have-Not	Have-Not	Have-Not	Have-Not	Have	Have-Not	Have
Alane	Have	Have-Not	Have-Not	Have	Have-Not	Have-Not	Have-Not	Have-Not	Have-Not	Have	Have-Not	Have-Not	Have-Not	Have-Not	Have-Not	Have-Not	Have-Not	Have-Not	Have-Not	Have-Not	Have-Not	Have	Have
Beatriz	Have	Have-Not	Have-Not	Have-Not	Have-Not	Have-Not	Have-Not	Have-Not	Have-Not	Have	Have-Not	Have-Not	Have	Have-Not	Have-Not	Have-Not	Have-Not	Have-Not	Have-Not	Have-Not	Have-Not	Have-Not	
Lucas	Have-Not	Have-Not	Have	Have	Have	Have	Have-Not	Have	Have-Not	Have-Not	Have	Have-Not	Have-Not	Have	Have-Not	Have	Have-Not	Have	Have-Not	Have-Not	Have-Not		
Giovanna	Have-Not	Have-Not	Have	Have-Not	Have-Not	Have-Not	Have	Have-Not	Have	Have-Not	Have-Not	Have-Not	Have-Not	Have	Have	Have-Not	Have	Have	Have-Not	Have-Not			
Bin Laden	Have-Not	Have-Not	Have	Have-Not	Have	Have	Have	Have	Have-Not	Have-Not	Have-Not	Have-Not	Have-Not	Have-Not	Have	Have-Not	Have	Have-Not	Have-Not				
Pitel	Have-Not	Have	Have-Not	Have-Not	Have	Have-Not	Have-Not	Have	Have	Have-Not	Have-Not	Have-Not	Have-Not	Have	Have-Not	Have	Have						
Fernanda	Have-Not	Have	Have-Not	Have-Not	Have	Have	Have	Have-Not	Have	Have-Not	Have-Not	Have-Not	Have-Not	Have-Not	Have	Have							
Leidy Elin	Have	Have-Not	Have	Have-Not	Have-Not	Have	Have-Not	Have	Have-Not	Have	Have	Have-Not	Have	Have-Not	Have								
Raquele	Have-Not	Have-Not	Have	Have-Not	Have-Not	Have	Have	Have-Not	Have	Have-Not	Have-Not	Have-Not	Have-Not	Have									
Yasmin	Have-Not	Have	Have-Not	Have-Not	Have	Have-Not	Have-Not	Have	Have-Not	Have-Not	Have	Have-Not	Have-Not										
Michel	Have-Not	Have-Not	Have	Have-Not	Have-Not	Have-Not	Have	Have-Not	Have	Have-Not	Have-Not												
Wanessa	Have	Have	Have-Not	Have-Not	Have	Have-Not	Have-Not	Have	Have-Not	Have-Not	Have												
Rodriguinho	Have	Have	Have-Not	Have	Have	Have-Not	Have	Have-Not	Have	Have-Not													
Deniziane	Have	Have	Have-Not	Have	Have-Not	Have	Have-Not	Have-Not	Have-Not														
Marcus	Have	Have-Not	Have	Have-Not	Have-Not	Have-Not	Have-Not	Have															
Juninho	Have-Not	Have-Not	Have-Not	Have	Have	Have-Not	Have-Not																
Luigi	Have-Not	Have-Not	Have	Have-Not	Have	Have																	
Vinícius	Have	Have	Have	Have	Have																		
Nizam	Have-Not	Have	Have-Not	Have-Not																			
Vanessa	Have-Not	Have-Not	Have-Not	Have																			
Pizane	Have-Not	Have	Have-Not																				
Thalyta	Have-Not	Have-Not																					
Maycon	Have																						

- ^Note 1: On week 3, Rodriguinho became have-not after Fernanda picked him for the Monster Punishment.
- ^Note 2: On week 3, Davi became have after earning a Have-Not Pass for winning the Veto competition in the first place. The Have-Not Pass was in effect for both weeks 3 and 4.
- ^Note 3: On week 4, Pitel became have-not after Matteus picked her for the Monster Punishment.
- ^Note 4: On week 8, Bin Laden became have-not after Pitel picked him for the Monster Punishment.
- ^Note 5: On week 8, due to various punishments, the all housemates become have-nots until the end of the week, after a punishment received by Fernanda.
- ^Note 6: On week 9, Davi became have-not after Lucas picked him for the Monster Punishment.
- ^Note 7: On day 88, due to various punishments, the all housemates become have-nots until the end of the week, after a punishment received by Beatriz.
- ^Note 8: On day 89, Giovanna and Lucas became have-not after Matteus picked them for the Monster Punishment.

== Controversies ==
=== Accusation of ableism ===
On January 9, 2024, during the first HoH's endurance competition, Maycon Cosmer made controversial comments and jokes towards Vinícius Rodrigues, an amputee Paralympic athlete. Maycon's attitudes were criticized by viewers on social media, being considered ableist and insensitive.

=== Accusation of racism ===
On January 9, 2024, during a bathroom conversation about makeup, Lucas Luigi made a racist comment when he, in an attempt to joke, called Leidy Elin Alvarenga a monkey. Later in the afternoon, Leidy Elin called Luigi out saying that them, as both Afro-Brazilians, cannot joke about these things because it's a very heavy word and is used a lot in the outside world. Luigi apologized.

=== Accusation of sexism ===
==== Nizam Hayek, Vinícius Rodrigues and Rodriguinho ====
In a conversation in the HoH's room, on January 13, 2024, sexist speeches by Rodriguinho and Nizam Hayek caused outrage on social media. They criticized Yasmin Brunet's body. To many, the comments came across as rude.

Later, in another conversation, Vinícius Rodrigues and Rodriguinho talked about the other women in the House.

==== Lucas Luigi ====
On January 19, 2024, Lucas Luigi, during a conversation with Giovanna Lima and Raquele Cardozo, the flooring installer commented on Alane Dias's body: "Come on, body comparison, you have the beauty that a man really likes. Alane She has a saggy, soft ass".

On January 22, 2024, during a conversation with Rodriguinho, Juninho Silva, Vinícius Rodrigues and MC Bin Laden at the gym, Luigi shot at Matteus Amaral about Deniziane Ferreira: "Play with her pussy [Deniziane], where she tells him he goes".

==== Fernanda Bande ====
On January 31, 2024, during a conversation at the gym, Fernanda Bande said to Alane Dias, suggesting she needs to exercise more to avoid sagging: "Carry more weight there, you're a little soft. You need to do more exercise than working your tongue", said the baker.

==== Davi Brito ====
Davi Brito was involved in some speeches considered sexist by the public at times, such as when he said that women must put themselves in their place to be respected by men. "A woman, because she is a woman, has to put herself in her place to have the man's respect.", he declared while talking to other housemates about the discussion he had with Leidy Elin Alvarenga days before.

=== Accusation of xenophobia ===
Still in the HoH's room, on January 13, viewers accused Rodriguinho of xenophobia after he mocked Isabelle Nogueira's Amazonian background in a conversation with Lucas Pizane and Vinícius Rodrigues after the later talked about his connection with her. "What? Do you like Boi-Bumbá too? That's all she talks about. She only sings Boi-Bumbá music", he said. Pizane countered his comment: "But you don't even talk to her, how do you know what she's talking about?", which Rodriguinho replied: "But that's what I see".

The night before, Rodriguinho had already caused controversy by referring to Isabelle as "índia" while placing her as his target during the live HoH's Crosshairs ceremony. After being warned by Wanessa Camargo about his comment, Rodriguinho went to talk to Isabelle who explained to him that the term "índio/índia" is no longer used: "It's kind of derogatory. But the world is understanding that now. It's indigenous or native people".

=== Accusation of homophobia ===
On January 14, 2024, Davi Brito used a homophobic slur during an argument with Nizam Hayek, when he accused him of being "fake" and "manipulative", while stating that: "I'm a man, I'm not a f**got". Later in the night, Michel Nogueira confronted Davi about his comments and advised him to be careful with his words when referring to social minorities and that he, as an openly gay man, is also in the House because of the struggle of an entire community. Davi apologized to Michel, claiming that he was in the heat of the moment and that it was not his intention to offend him.

After Michel left the room, Isabelle Nogueira, who was also present and heard the conversation, added that when you use a derogatory term like that, you are violating an entire group of people.

He later said that he would prefer to have a son instead of a daughter, with the reasoning: "I want to have a boy, teach the kid to be a man".

=== Vanessa's withdrawal ===
On January 19, 2024, Vanessa Lopes pressed the Withdrawn Button and walked from the game. In previous moments, Vanessa's mental health was questioned by both housemates and the public, as the housemate had several crying spells and controversial speeches at some points in the show.

Some celebrities spoke out on the matter, showing concern for the digital influencer.

On February 18, 2024, Vanessa said, in an interview with Fantástico, that she had an acute psychotic condition. The reason she withdrew from participating in the reality show was to take care of hers health.

=== Accusation of harassment ===
In the early hours of February 5, during a party, Alane Dias accused Juninho Silva of harassment. As soon as the live show on TV Globo ended, Alane called Juninho in front of all the housemates to express satisfaction about him hitting on her during the party on February 3, 2024.

On February 6, during Juninho's eviction speech, the host Tadeu Schmidt clarified the situation and drew Alane's attention indirectly: "How many times in your life have you argued, fought with someone and thought, if everyone saw this, everyone I'd be right. Have you ever thought if every discussion in life was like this? It's all recorded, let's review the images, show them to people, and people will say who's right." Tadeu then questioned the accusations made by Alane: "Did you use the correct words? Are you sure of what you are talking about? Are you sure of what you are defending? If you bet all your chips, it is essential not to have any doubts [...] Let's make one thing very clear. If someone had played outside the rules, this eviction wouldn't even be happening. We would have already taken action.", clarified the host. He ends by clarifying that the production analyzed all the images and did not identify any crime on the part of Juninho.

=== Accusation of aggression ===
==== Wanessa's ejection ====
In the early hours of March 2, Wanessa Camargo was dancing drunk in the magic room, when she ended up slapping Davi Brito on the leg, who was sleeping. Shortly after the act, the singer apologized to the housemate and claimed that she was "very crazy". However, Davi didn't like Wanessa's attitude and complained when he was talking to Matteus Amaral, "She [Wanessa] saw that I was lying down. There are four beds in that room, did she come and hit my bed right away? Besides being a provocation, it's a lack of respect I was sleeping, man. I even lost sleep.".

In the morning the singer was called to the Diary Room and was ejected from the game, after more complaints from Davi and the public.

==== Davi and MC Bin Laden ====
On March 25, 2024, after Big Sincere, Davi Brito and MC Bin Laden were involved in a widespread fight that spread throughout the house and caused controversy. The moment happened when Bin Laden and Matteus Amaral were talking about the events of the dynamic, when Davi ended up entering and a big argument started between the two.

The fight started during the dynamic. Davi stated that Bin Laden betrayed his allies on the show, while the funk singer pointed out that the Bahian played the victim. During the fight, the housemates exchanged insults and even fought each other. Internet users pointed out that the housemates should be ejected for excessive physical touching during the discussion. The dummies tried to intervene, but the insults continued. Until the show's production team put an end to the fight: "This is a conversation game. If it were a fight, it would be UFC. We have limits and they have to be respected. Respect that limit.", said the voice.

On social media, part of the public called for the Davi and Bin Laden's ejection. Attacks allegedly occurred when the app driver "headbutted" the singer and when Lucas Henrique Ferreira fell to the ground, while trying to restrain Bin Laden.

=== Breaking the rules by Beatriz Reis ===
During Sabrina Sato's visit to the house on March 20, 2024, Beatriz Reis ended up knocking the guest to the floor when trying to hug her when entering the house. The scene happened when the housemates, who were returning from the outside area, came across a strange movement on the other side of the door. When they returned to the show room they met with the presenter and Beatriz went too far and in a whirl hugging the guest, ended up falling to the floor with the presenter who almost hit her back on the table in the center of the room. The impact of the fall was not greater because it was cushioned by the housemates who held her body.

On social media, internet users called for Beatriz's ejection and emphasized that the production should stop "cutting the corner" on the housemate's attitudes towards the presence of celebrities on the show. The hashtag #BeatrizEjected ended up trending on Twitter. Hours after the incident, the production of the reality show caught Beatriz's attention through the voice speaking to the house, announcing that she would lose 500 stakes as punishment, and Alane, who also participated in the incident, would lose 200. "Attention gentlemen! Attention, Mrs. Beatriz, especially Mrs. Beatriz for her attitudes when we have a guest in the house, when we have an artist. You committed a very serious act. You have already been warned several times and you have to control yourself in front of the other people.".

It was not the first time that Beatriz was criticized by the public and participants for her exaggerated reactions towards guests in the house. During the weekly party on February 24, she ended up hugging singer Xande de Pilares several times, in addition to staying on the steps of the stage that the singers use, which is prohibited in the show's rules, with her ignoring all warnings from others housemates for her to come down from the stairs. Later, the production called Beatriz to the Diary Room and drew the housemate's attention, saying that if she exceeded the show's rules again, she could be ejected.

=== Accusations of partiality in production ===
This season has faced several accusations from the public, allegedly not applying the principle of equality and treating housemates unequally, which would demonstrate injustice. Some examples illustrate this situation. When Davi Brito expressed his desire to give up the show, the production did not allow it and called him to the Diary Room, something that did not happen with other housemates who walked from the game, such as Vanessa Lopes, a housemate in the same season as Davi. Subsequently, the conversation between the housemate and director Boninho was leaked, in which the director convinced Davi to remain in the show and reinforced that he would lose the benefits accumulated throughout the game, such as the scholarship for a university course at Estácio.

A similar case occurred when Leidy Elin Alvarenga requested permission from the production to provoke Davi. The production authorized, except physical contact, and after obtaining approval, Leidy Elin provoked Davi by throwing his clothes into the pool. After the event, Davi, being angry, planned to throw a bucket of water on Leidy Elin while she was sleeping, which could result in his ejection from the show for putting the physical integrity of a fellow prisoner at risk. However, management intervened and prevented Davi from making this decision. The following day, the host Tadeu Schmidt reprimanded Leidy Elin, stating that her attitude had gone beyond the limits, even though she had received prior authorization from the production. In the same intervention, Tadeu pointed out that Davi's ideas of revenge against the participant also went beyond the limit.

Another situation that demonstrated partiality on the part of director Boninho was when he liked a post on Twitter attacking housemates Leidy Elin and Yasmin Brunet, while praising Davi.

Another controversial episode occurred when Sabrina Sato visited the housemates in the house and did not treat everyone equally, being accused of partiality with the "Fairies" group, composed of Davi Brito, Beatriz Reis, Matteus Amaral, Isabelle Nogueira and Alane Dias, leaving the other housemates in the house uncomfortable. with production. On the same day, Fernanda Bande admitted to being upset at not having been noticed by Sabrina Sato, and also reported that Sabrina gave spoilers about what the repercussions of the game outside the house would be like due to the treatment she received. During her visit to the most watched venue in Brazil, Sato was knocked to the ground by Beatriz — who had already attracted attention for going on stage during the Xande de Pilares show — and lost 500 stakes. Alane, for having participated in the moment, lost 200 stakes. The fact outraged internet users, since Beatriz had been informed weeks ago that, if her attitude of disrespecting the space of artists and guests were to be repeated, there would be a risk of ejection.

== Ratings and reception ==
=== Brazilian ratings ===
All numbers are in points and provided by Kantar Ibope Media.

Week	First air date	Last air date	Timeslot (BRT)	Daily SP viewers (in points)							SP viewers (in points)	BR viewers (in points)	Ref.
Week	First air date	Last air date	Timeslot (BRT)	Mon	Tue	Wed	Thu	Fri	Sat	Sun	SP viewers (in points)	BR viewers (in points)	Ref.
1	January 8, 2024	January 14, 2024	Monday to Saturday; 10:30 p.m. Sunday; 11:00 p.m.	22.0	23.3	22.6	22.0	22.7	21.5	16.9	21.6	20.9	
2	January 15, 2024	January 21, 2024	Monday to Saturday; 10:30 p.m. Sunday; 11:00 p.m.	23.1	21.7	21.5	21.5	22.8	19.4	16.1	20.9	19.7	
3	January 22, 2024	January 28, 2024	Monday to Saturday; 10:30 p.m. Sunday; 11:00 p.m.	19.0	20.2	19.8	19.1	21.1	18.6	16.0	19.1	18.6	
4	January 29, 2024	February 4, 2024	Monday to Saturday; 10:30 p.m. Sunday; 11:00 p.m.	20.6	19.9	21.1	20.5	20.7	20.2	16.6	19.9	19.4	
5	February 5, 2024	February 11, 2024	Monday to Saturday; 10:30 p.m. Sunday; 11:00 p.m.	21.4	20.1	18.5	18.0	19.9	19.3	15.6	19.0	19.5	
6	February 12, 2024	February 18, 2024	Monday to Saturday; 10:30 p.m. Sunday; 11:00 p.m.	21.6	21.0	21.0	20.1	21.1	20.6	17.3	20.4	19.8	
7	February 19, 2024	February 25, 2024	Monday to Saturday; 10:30 p.m. Sunday; 11:00 p.m.	21.0	20.2	19.5	19.0	20.8	20.7	16.1	19.6	19.8	
8	February 26, 2024	March 3, 2024	Monday to Saturday; 10:30 p.m. Sunday; 11:00 p.m.	20.3	21.4	18.0	19.7	21.0	21.9	18.3	20.1	20.2	
9	March 4, 2024	March 10, 2024	Monday to Saturday; 10:30 p.m. Sunday; 11:00 p.m.	21.1	21.1	20.0	20.8	21.3	18.6	16.5	19.9	20.2	
10	March 11, 2024	March 17, 2024	Monday to Saturday; 10:30 p.m. Sunday; 11:00 p.m.	20.5	23.3	21.5	22.3	21.1	18.8	17.6	20.7	20.7	
11	March 18, 2024	March 24, 2024	Monday to Saturday; 10:30 p.m. Sunday; 11:00 p.m.	21.8	21.8	21.5	20.9	21.6	20.3	17.5	20.8	20.6	
12	March 25, 2024	March 31, 2024	Monday to Saturday; 10:30 p.m. Sunday; 11:00 p.m.	21.4	24.5	22.4	20.5	22.5	18.8	17.7	21.1	21.1	
13	April 1, 2024	April 7, 2024	Monday to Saturday; 10:30 p.m. Sunday; 11:00 p.m.	21.9	20.8	11.5	22.5	21.9	19.7	18.0	19.5	19.8	
14	April 8, 2024	April 14, 2024	Monday to Saturday; 10:30 p.m. Sunday; 11:00 p.m.	20.8	22.5	11.6	22.8	22.1	19.0	18.9	19.7	20.8	
15	April 15, 2024	April 16, 2024	Monday to Saturday; 10:30 p.m. Sunday; 11:00 p.m.	21.5	26.7	—	—	—	—	—	24.1	25.7	

- In 2024, each point represents 253.273 households in 15 market cities in Brazil (73.279 households in São Paulo).

== Spin-offs ==
=== Davi, Um Cara Comum da Bahia (Note: (English: Davi, A Common Guy from Bahia)) ===
A spin-off about the life of the show's winner, Davi Brito, was announced on April 16, 2024 during the season's finale. The documentary series Davi, Um Cara Comum da Bahia (in reference to a catchphrase used by Rodriguinho in an argument with the driver) was released on May 8, 2024, on Globoplay, and it covers Davi's life before, during, and after his participation in the reality show Big Brother Brasil.

==== Cast ====
Interpreter	Character	Ref.
Davi Brito	Himself	
Carolina Dieckmann	Herself	
Carla Perez	Herself	
Gloria Perez	Herself	
Isabelle Nogueira	Herself	
Ivete Sangalo	Herself	
Leo Santana	Himself	
Luís Miranda	Himself	
Maíra Azevedo	Herself	
Márcio Victor	Himself	
Matteus Amaral	Himself	
Samuel de Assis	Himself	
Xanddy	Himself	
Jean Pedro	Davi Brito (simulation)	
Mariana Freire	Mani Rego (simulation)	

=== Na Cama com Pitanda (Note: (English: In Bed with Pitanda)) ===
It is a spin-off of a talk show hosted by Fernanda Bande and Giovanna Pitel, aired on Multishow and premiering on June 10, 2024. In the attraction, Fernanda and Pitel receive guests on a double bed, where they talk about their intimacies in a light and fun way.
