= Vanessa Lopes =

Brazilian social media personality (born 2001)

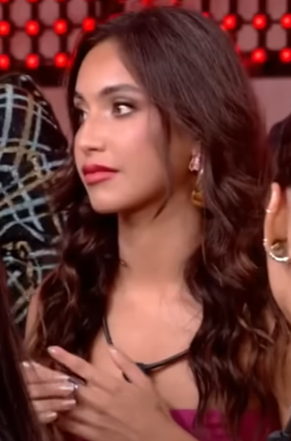
- Lopes in 2024
- Born: Vanessa Lopes Ramalho; 5 July 2001 (age 25); Brasília, Brazil
- Occupation: Social media personality

Instagram information
- Page: vanessalopesr_
- Years active: 2013-present
- Followers: 15.1 million

TikTok information
- Page: Vanessa Lopes
- Followers: 30.9 million

YouTube information
- Years active: 2020–present
- Genres: beauty, fashion
- Subscribers: 1.77 million (14 July 2024)
- Views: 120 million (14 July 2024)

Vanessa Lopes Ramalho (born July 5, 2001) is a Brazilian digital influencer and dancer. She is known for her choreography videos on TikTok, where she has more than 30.5 million followers. In 2024, she was a participant in the twenty-fourth edition of the reality show Big Brother Brasil; Vanessa's participation was brief and generated controversy.

== Biography ==
Lopes was born in Brasília, but moved to Recife as a child. She created a TikTok account while she was at university and, during the COVID-19 pandemic, started recording and posting dance videos on the app. As of January 2024, Lopes has 30.2 million followers on TikTok and 14.3 million followers on Instagram. She presents the podcast Não é TPM with Fernanda Schneider, Gabriela Mag, Victória Collen, Isa Paoli and Vivi Wanderley.

In 2024, Vanessa Lopes was a member of the "Celebrity" group in the 24th season of Big Brother Brasil. In January of the same year, her TikTok account had a total of 1 billion likes.

== Personal life ==
=== Relationships and personal interests ===
Vanessa Lopes is openly bisexual. In June 2021, she began dating football player and TikToker Ricardo Rêgo, which lasted six months. Vanessa also had involvement with actor João Guilherme, and publicly shared interactions with other personalities, such as Luísa Sonza, Lara Silva, Gabi Lopes and Gabriel Medina.

On social media, Lopes also highlights her passion for sports, being a Flamengo fan and a footvolley player, as well as demonstrating an interest in surfing, an activity she also does during her free time.

=== Accident ===
After completing high school, Lopes had the desire to go on exchange and study abroad. However, during a trip with a friend, DJ Alan Maciel, she was hit by a driver who fled the scene, near Porto de Galinhas. They were on their way to a show when their vehicle had a flat tire. At the time of the exchange, a car hit them and threw them about 20 meters away. Vanessa was holding the flashlight so that Maciel could have a better view when changing the tire. At the time of the accident, Vanessa was just 18 years old, and this traumatic experience made her rethink the idea of living far from family and friends, leading her to conclude that it wasn't worth going abroad.

A year after the road tragedy, Lopes decided to split her time between attending college for marketing and getting involved in creating digital content.

=== Mental health ===
Throughout her participation in BBB 24, Lopes revealed that she was confronting emotional triggers from past traumas, showing signs of psychological instability. Her instability increased when comments appeared alleging that she was a superficial person, constantly looking in the mirror, and that her attitudes, including her moments of crying, were not genuine. When faced with the accusations, Vanessa remembered difficult situations she had faced before the reality show, clarifying that her habit of looking in the mirror was a strategy to deal with the temporomandibular disorder she faces and that she seeks to recover. In the following days, her emotional instability intensified, reflected in her increasingly weakened participation. Vanessa also revealed that she felt persecuted, even thinking that she was being persecuted and affected on purpose. Furthermore, she made frequent references to George Orwell's book 1984, which inspired the creation of Big Brother. In a peculiar moment, she questioned whether her confinement colleagues were actors, highlighting the depth of her psychological discomfort during the program. Vanessa also got involved in intriguing situations with other participants and even threw away all her colleagues' toothbrushes while cleaning the bathroom.

Vanessa's behaviors raised concerns among viewers, who expressed fears about her mental health, urging the show's production team to intervene. There was also speculation about the possibility of a psychotic break during the events. On social media, personalities such as Bruna Marquezine, Jojo Todynho, Mel Maia and Deborah Secco also expressed concern about Vanessa's mental health, while Whindersson Nunes stated that he had faced similar crises, sympathizing with her situation, classifying the episode as a situation of mania.

On January 19, Vanessa left the program. In an interview with Fantástico, the influencer revealed that she had an acute psychotic condition.

Vanessa was also invited to participate in the program Altas Horas to discuss her mental health and shared the following statement:

I am fine. Now I'm in treatment, but I'm still scared. Admitting that you are sick is a little scary, but it is part of the process, the treatment and also to talk a little about mental health. I'm happy to talk to you about this here. I'm fine, but I want to get even better.

— said the digital influencer to Serginho Groisman.

== Filmography ==
=== Television ===
Year	Title	Role	Notes	Ref.
2022	Let's Dance com Nightography	Juror		
2024	Big Brother Brasil	Participant (23rd Place)	Season 24	
2024	Túnel do Amor	Participant	Season 3	

== Discography ==
=== Single ===
Song	Year
"Chapadinha na Gaveta"	2022

== Awards and nominations ==
Year	Ceremony	Category	Result	Ref.
2021	Meus Prêmios Nick 2021	Challenger of the Year	Nominated	

== See also ==
- List of YouTubers
