= Peladão =

Soccer tournament in Brazil

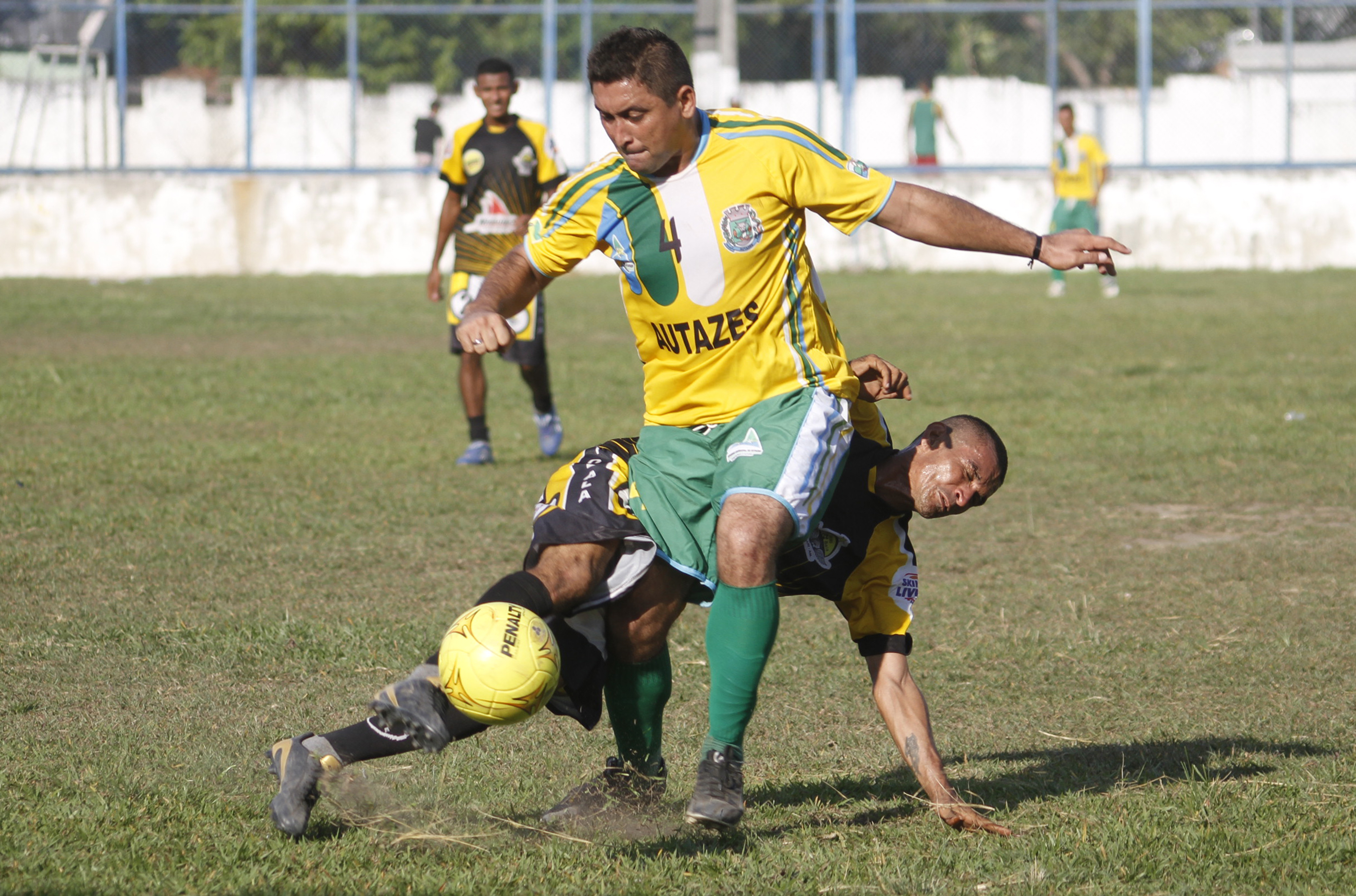
A scene of a match from Peladão

Peladão is the name for which is known the Campeonato de Peladas do Amazonas, an amateur football/soccer tournament held in the Brazilian city of Manaus every year between August and December. It is organized by the Rede Calderaro de Comunicação (a local media conglomerate, owner, among others, of the newspaper A Crítica and the television channel TV A Crítica).

The tournament, established in 1973 at the initiative of local journalist Arnaldo Santos, has more than 1,000 participating teams, making the tournament the largest amateur soccer championship in Brazil. The teams compete in 5 categories: Main, Master (for people over 39 years old), Peladão (for teenagers, with prior parental authorization and with presentation of proof of enrollment from an educational institution) Indian Peladão and feminine.

Unlike other soccer tournaments, the peladão also has a beauty pageant. Each team is assigned a beauty queen to participate in the pageant. If the soccer team loses the competition, they can return to it if their beauty queen is successful. If the beauty queen decides to quit, the team is out.

The objective of the event is to teach virtues in the community through football. A specific rule of the event is that for every card earned by a team, the team's players must donate soccer balls to poor children in the community.

The first time women participated in the tournament as players was in 2008 when the women's category was established.

In 2012 the beauty pageant became a reality show called "Peladão a Bordo - O Reality" (later adopting the name "A Bordo - O Reality").

In October 2006, a German documentary, Pelado - Soccer Teams and Beauty Queens, was released internationally. It was made by Lunacy Film Ltd. The Peladão Tournament was also featured in the "Celso" episode of Ginga, a documentary about football styles in Brazil, produced by Nike's Joga Bonito. It was also briefly featured in Discovery Atlas: Brazil.
