= Taty Girl =

Brazilian Forró singer, composer, and businesswoman

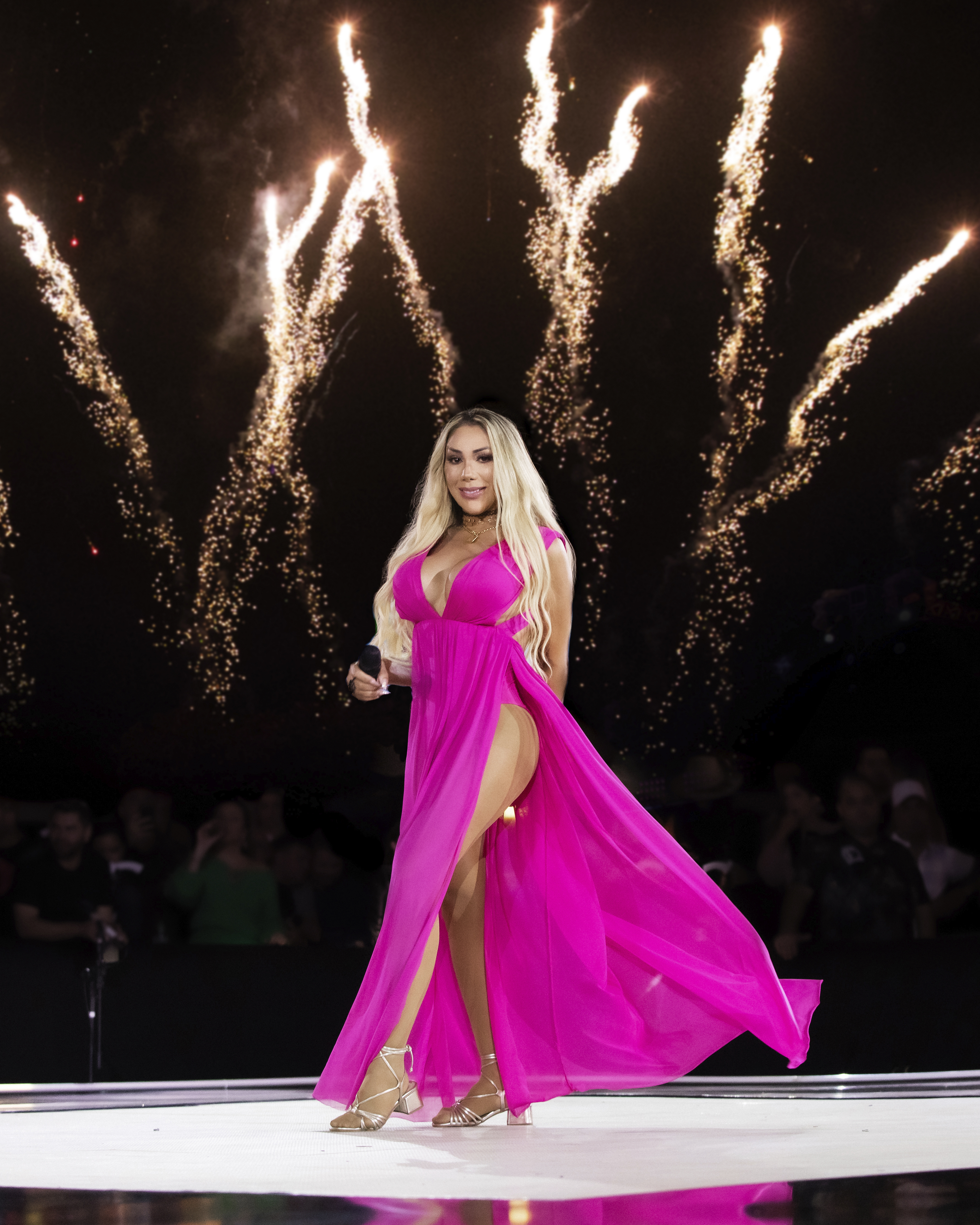
- Taty in August 2019
- Born: Tatiana Maria Nascimento de Araújo
- Occupations: Singer-songwriter; Businesswoman

Taty Girl (Portuguese pronunciation: [ˈtat͡ʃi ˈɡɛw]) is the artistic name of Tatiana Maria Nascimento de Araújo (Aracoiaba, August 9, 1976). She is a Brazilian Forró singer, composer, and businesswoman. Taty has been a member of bands Rabo de Saia, Gaviões do Forró, Forró Real and Solteirões do Forró before launching her solo career in 2009.

== Biography ==
Taty Girl was born in 1976 in Aracoiaba, Ceará. She was orphaned at four years old and had a poor childhood. Later, in order to escape domestic violence, Taty was homeless in Fortaleza from her twelve to fourteen years of age.

Taty worked as a maid for years until auditioning for a position at the Rabo de Saia band organized by SomZoom Sat Radio. Later she was also a member of other Forró bands such as Gaviões do Forró, Forró Real and Solteirões do Forró. She has been on a solo career since 2009.

== Ferroviário Atlético Clube ==
In November 2024, football club Ferroviário Atlético Clube (CE) announced that Taty would be their new sponsor for the Fares Lopes Championship during the 2024/2025 season.
