= Isabelle Nogueira =

Brazilian dancer and model (born 1992)

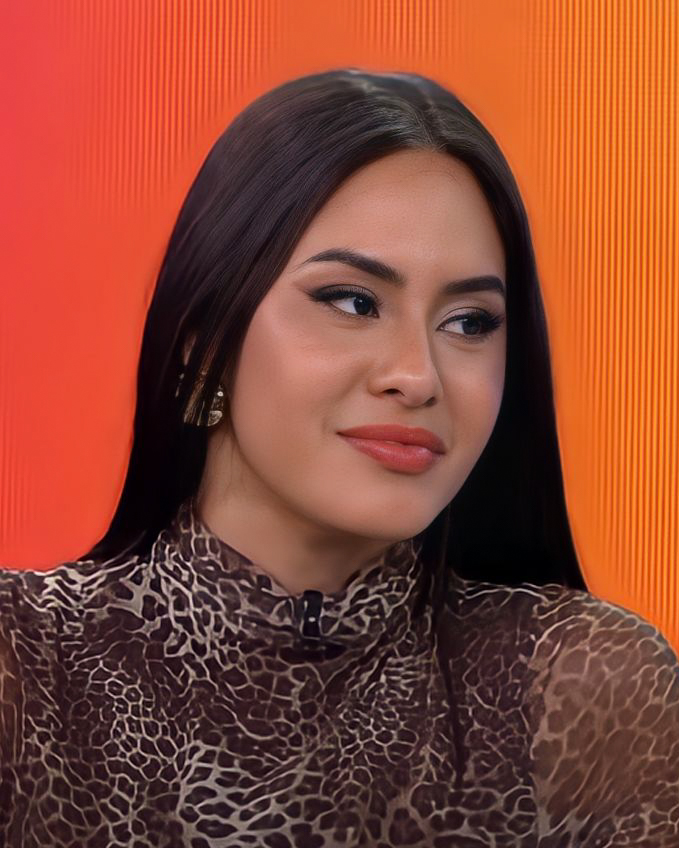
- Isabelle during the special BBB 24 - The Reunion, on April 17, 2024.
- Born: Isabelle Adriana Nogueira Dias; 21 December 1992 (age 33); Manaus, Amazonas, Brazil
- Other names: Cunhã; Isabelle de Pádua; Isa-A-Bela
- Education: Amazonas State University
- Occupations: Dancer; digital influencer; Teacher
- Years active: 2015–present
- Height: 1.61 m (5 ft 3 in)

Isabelle Adriana Nogueira Dias (Brazilian Portuguese: [izabeˈli noˈɡejɾɐ]; (born December 21, 1992, in Manaus, Brazil) is a Brazilian dancer, entrepreneur, teacher, writer of children's literature, digital influencer, and model.

She gained regional prominence between 2015 and 2017 as the Rainha do Folclore (Queen of Folklore) of the Boi-Bumbá Garantido, a traditional character in the Parintins Folkloric Festival. In 2018, she assumed the role of Cunhã-Poranga, one of the leading female figures of the festival. In 2024, she rose to national fame as a contestant on the twenty-fourth season of the reality television show Big Brother Brasil, later being named Ambassador of the Parintins Folkloric Festival.

== Biography ==
Born on December 21, 1992, in the city of Manaus, Amazonas, Isabelle Nogueira is the daughter of Jaqueline Nogueira Barbosa, originally from the municipality of Nhamundá (Amazonas), and Marcos Dias, a native of Belém, in the state of Pará.

Her mother, Jaqueline Nogueira, was 14 years old when she gave birth to Isabelle. Facing the challenges of a teenage pregnancy, she initially entrusted Isabelle’s care to another family. However, after about a year, she decided to take back care of Isabelle and resumed raising her. Isabelle experienced a humble and solitary childhood in the neighborhoods of Presidente Vargas and Nova Cidade, in Manaus.

At the age of 9, she started working selling clothes with her grandmother at the Grande Circular street market, in the East Zone of Manaus. Isabelle also worked handing out flyers on the streets and as an attendant at an Internet cafe.

Boi Bumbá has always been part of her history. As a teenager, she joined to Folklorike Dance Groups, participated in shows for tourists, and was stage dancer for several artists, such as David Asayag and Banda Carrapicho. In 2009, she became the Rhythmic Queen of Boi Brilhante, the following year she was promoted to Folklore Queen, between 2011 and 2014 she performed as cunhã-poranga. In 2013, she won the Miss Manaus beauty contest.

Isabelle holds a degree in Languages with a specialization in Spanish and a postgraduate degree in School Management and Higher Education Methodology from the State University of Amazonas (UEA). She has experience as a teacher but currently focuses on her artistic and entrepreneurial career, working as a dancer, businesswoman, and digital influencer.

== Career ==
2015–2024: Boi Garantido and Big Brother Brasil

An artist rooted in Amazonian popular culture, Isabelle Nogueira was the Folklore Queen (“Rainha do Folclore”) for Boi Garantido, one of the main teams in the Parintins Folkloric Festival, from 2015 to 2017—a prestigious role she won through a competitive contest in 2014. In 2016, she was crowned Miss Amazonas Globo, a regional beauty title in the Brazilian state of Amazonas. Since 2018, she has represented item 9, “Cunhã-Poranga,” a key symbolic character of the Boi Bumbá Garantido, which is a traditional folk festival involving music, dance, and storytelling from Northern Brazil.

In 2021, she participated in the documentary series starring Robert M. Rey, On the Road with Dr. Rey, where Isabelle represented the indigenous peoples of Amazonas.

On January 7, 2024, Isabelle Nogueira was announced as one of the participants in the annex house group of the twenty-fourth season of the reality show Big Brother Brasil. After a public vote, she was officially chosen to enter the main house with 60.22% of the votes. During the show, she stood out for her authenticity and charisma, survived seven elimination rounds, and secured a place in the finale, finishing in third place.

On June 29, she was announced as the new muse of Acadêmicos do Grande Rio for the 2025 Rio carnival,[32][33] which brought the plot "Pororocas Parawaras: the waters of my charms in the accounts of the curimbós".

In September, she participated as a guest speaker at Climate Week NYC 2024, invited by the National Articulation of Indigenous Women Warriors of Ancestry (ANMIGA) and Casa Amazônia. During the event, she also appeared on the program Brazil News, broadcast by Seabra Brazilian Television.

=== 2025 ===
Isabelle was a muse for Acadêmicos do Grande Rio during the 2025 Rio Carnival, which presented the theme “Pororocas Parawaras: The Enchanted Waters Reflected in the Beads of the Curimbós.” She also made her debut at the São Paulo Carnival, appearing as a featured performer on a float for the samba school Acadêmicos do Tucuruvi, which brought the theme “Assojaba – The Quest for the Sacred Mantle.”

The first episode of O Diário da Cunhã, a series that shows the artist's preparation for the Parintins Folklore Festival of the respective year, was released on YouTube on April 17.

The first edition of Festival da Cunhã took place on May 22–24, 2025. Created and led by Isabelle Nogueira, with support from Mynd agency and Pump Entertainment, the event is a cultural and social platform rooted in sustainability, Indigenous empowerment, and the celebration of female leadership. The festival promotes traditional arts and Amazonian identity while encouraging responsible tourism and community development in Northern Brazil.

The event brought together 30,000 people at the Arena da Amazônia and collected 30 tons of non-perishable food through the solidarity track. The food will be donated to communities affected by climate change and distributed by the Sustainable Amazon Foundation (FAS). In partnership with the startup Tree Earth, 750 trees were planted in a deforested area of Lake Puraquequara, in the rural area of Manaus.

On June 15, 2025, Isabelle Nogueira made her debut as a children’s literature author at the Rio de Janeiro Book Fair. She launched the graphic novel The Adventures of Cunhã, published by Editora UEA in partnership with Professor Darlisom Ferreira.

== Awards and honors ==
On May 16, she received the title of Ambassador of the Parintins Folklore Festival.At the ceremony, the mayor of Parintins, Frank Bi Garcia, highlighted Nogueira's influence in promoting the Festival: "She will, without a doubt, increasingly promote the Parintins Festival, which is a cultural and tourist product that generates jobs and income, and job opportunities for thousands of people from Parintins."

On May 8, 2024, she received the title and medal of honor for merit from the State University of Amazonas (UEA), in recognition of her contribution to the national and international dissemination and projection of Amazonian culture and tourism.

On June 3, 2024, Nogueira was awarded the Ruy Araújo Medal, the highest honor of the Amazonian legislature. In her speech, Nogueira reaffirmed herself as a woman of the people, and that she loves the state where she was born and raised: "I receive this honor with the certainty that I came from the people, and for the people I have to do it. I promise and commit myself every day that I will make Amazonas my mission of faith, because it is not enough to say where you came from, you have to fight, you have to love, and I love you, my Amazonas."

On April 30, 2025, she received the title of Honorary Citizen of Parintins and the award for cultural merit "Jair Mendes Medal". The ceremony reinforced the institutional recognition of Isabelle's trajectory, who acts as a cultural representative of the municipality at a national level. "May God be praised for this moment! I am a daughter of Parintins by heart and by the culture that formed me. This tribute is the confirmation that loving my people, my land, and representing them with pride is worth it", declared Isabelle during the ceremony.

On May 2, 2025, she received the title of Honorary Citizen of Juruti, in recognition of her contribution to the promotion and appreciation of northern culture, especially at Festribal. "Now I am Isabelle Nogueira: a Manaus native by identity, a Cunhã from Parintins, an Amazonian artist, and a warrior from Pará. I am Pan-Amazonia, the resistance of all the people who move the culture of the Amazon, of the forest. I swear to love you, Juruti," Isabelle declared in a passionate speech, highlighting the city of Juruti, a municipality where she lived for a few years.

On June 5, 2025, Nogueira was honored during a plenary session at ALEAM, in celebration of the Parintins Folklore Festival. "What we need is everyone's support, because that's how we will continue to invade Brazil and show Brazil that the Parintins Folklore Festival and the Amazon deserve recognition and value in the face of the national scenario that at some point tried to camouflage us. We are giants!", said the ambassador.

== Activism ==
Since 2018, she has been working as a volunteer for the Rede Feminina de Combate ao Câncer Amazonas (RFCC-AM), which develops social projects for cancer patients at the Amazonas State Oncology Control Center Foundation (FCecon).

=== Indigenous advocacy ===
Nogueira actively supports indigenous rights. On July 10, 2024, Nogueira published on his social media his position in the fight against PEC 48/2023, which defines the date of the promulgation of the Brazilian Federal Constitution as a time frame for the demarcation of indigenous lands.

She stands out for her activism in defense of indigenous rights. In 2022, she presented the program "Sehay-sehay with Cunhã: the voices of the original people" (in Sateré-Mawé: Sehay-sehay; chat) on Boi Bumbá Garantido's social networks. The project consisted of a series of art-educational interviews with indigenous leaders and artists, personalities such as Sonia Guajajara, Thais Kokama, Mari Wapichana, W'eena Tikuna, Samela Sateré Mawé, Vanda Witoto and Marciely Tupari, participated in the program.

Essentially Amazonian, she works to promote and develop projects that contribute to the income of riverside communities, promoting tourism and crafts. She encourages reflection and debate on the impact of climate change on the populations of the Brazilian Amazon.

In August 2024, at the invitation of the Sustainable Amazon Foundation (FAS), she visited the Tumbira community, located in the municipality of Iranduba and 69 kilometers from the capital of Amazonas, to learn about socio-environmental projects supported by the foundation. Also aparticipated at the second edition of the Glocal Amazônia 2024 event, discussing the role oaf the media in influencing sustainable practices and behaviors, in the panel "The importance of mass communication in promoting sustainability".

On September 4, Amazon Day, she moderated the debate: “How climate change impacts the lives of women in the Amazon”, promoted by FAS. The panel was broadcast on YouTube and addressed the increase and alarming consequences of fires in the Amazon, such as the deterioration of air quality and risks to the health of the population, as well as the impacts of severe drought affecting the Amazon rivers. Also in September, she attended Climate Week in New York,[66] invited by the co-founder of the National Articulation of Indigenous Women Warriors of Ancestry (ANMIGA), Puyr Tembé, Nogueira spoke about the creative economy and the appreciation of cultural traditions in the Amazon region.

== Personal life ==
Her family origins are quite branched. Her mother is from Nhamundá, a town in the interior of Amazonas, and her entire paternal family, including her father, are from Belém, in Pará. Isabelle lived in Manaus, Parintins and Juruti, and currently lives in São Paulo. She has indigenous ancestry through her maternal grandmother, a resistance of the Sateré Mawé and Hixkaryana people

Isabelle has had four relationships: one lasting six years, one lasting seven years, in which she became engaged, another lasting two years, and another lasting approximately 10 months, in which she also became engaged. She has been single since February 5, 2025.

== Filmography ==
=== Television ===
Year	Title	Role	Notes	Ref.
2018	Peladão a Bordo	Participant (Winner)	7th Season	
2024	Big Brother Brasil	Housemate (3rd Place)	24th Season	
2025	Eita Lucas!	Assistant		
2025–present	A Bordo – O Reality	Presenter	14h and 15th Seasons	

=== Internet ===
Year	Title	Role	Notes	Ref.
2022–2023	Sehay-sehay com a Cunhã	Host	Instagram	

=== Music videos ===
Year	Title	Artist	Ref.
2024	"Respingo de Saudade"	Joelma	

== Competitions ==
- Miss Manaus – 2013.
- Miss Amazonas Globo – 2016.

== Titles at the Parintins Folklore Festival ==
Year	Item	Boi Bumbá	Ref.
2016	Rainha do Folclore	Garantido	
2019	Cunhã-poranga	Garantido	

== Bibliography ==
- Santos, Ana Lucia Cavalcante dos (2022). Corpo, cultura e poder: as várias representações da cunhã poranga do festival folclórico de Parintins (MSc thesis). Manaus: Federal University of Amazonas. p. 138.
