= Big Brother Brasil 5 =

- Season 5
- Presented by: Pedro Bial
- No. of days: 79
- No. of housemates: 15
- Winner: Jean Wyllys
- Runner-up: Grazielli Massafera
- No. of episodes: 79

Release
- Original network: Globo
- Original release: January 10 – March 29, 2005

Season chronology
- ← Previous; Big Brother Brasil 4 Next → Big Brother Brasil 6

Big Brother Brasil 5 was the fifth season of Big Brother Brasil which premiered January 10, 2005, with the season finale airing March 29, 2005, on the Rede Globo television network.

The show was produced by Endemol Globo and presented by news reporter Pedro Bial and directed by Jose Bonifacio Brasil de Oliveira. The prize award was R$1 million without tax allowances.

The winner was 30-year-old college professor Jean Wyllys from Alagoinhas, Bahia. He was the first housemate to come out during the show.

== Overview ==
There were fourteen housemates competing for the grand prize. The season lasted 79 days, a decrease of almost one week over the previous season. The season introduced the Z$ Estaleca (currency of the house). For the first time since the first season, the Finale Night featured a Final Three rather than a Final Two. Aline Cristina is the currently tied with Big Brother Spain 11's Nagore for the highest eviction percentage in the world, 95%.

=== Reunion show ===
The reunion was hosted by Pedro Bial and aired on April 3, 2005. All the housemates, except Marielza, attended. Tati Pink ended up winning the "Big Boss Prize" which awarded a new Fiat Stilo. She won over Marcos with 76% of the fans' vote. This was the last season that air a reunion.

=== After the show ===
Grazielli Massafera became a very popular celebrity and starred in a 2006 Rede Globo's prime-time soap opera entitled Páginas da Vida. She also starred another soap-operas like Desejo Proibido, Negócio da China (protagonist) and Tempos Modernos (main antagonist).

Jean Wyllys was elected federal congressman for Socialism and Liberty Party (PSOL) in 2010 and was re-elected in 2014. He is famous for being openly gay and gay rights activist. His most famous opponent is the right-wing conservative congressman Jair Bolsonaro.

== Housemates ==
(ages stated at time of contest)

Name	Age	Occupation	Hometown	Day entered	Day exited	Result
Jean Wyllys	30	College teacher	Alagoinhas	1	79	Winner
Grazielli Massafera	22	Model	Jacarezinho	1	79	Runner-up
Sammy Ueda	26	Seller	Indaiatuba	1	79	Third place
Alan Passos	25	Engineer	Belo Horizonte	1	77	11th Evicted
Tatiane Pink Barbosa	24	Hairdresser	Recife	1	72	10th Evicted
Karla Pereira	21	Dancer	Recife	1	65	9th Evicted
Aline Cristina	18	Student	Rio de Janeiro	15	58	8th Evicted
Tatiana Machado	27	Promoter	Rio de Janeiro	1	51	7th Evicted
Natalia Nara	22	Model	Fortaleza	1	44	6th Evicted
Paulo André Costa	28	Management consultant	Guarulhos	1	37	5th Evicted
Rogerio Padovan	27	Doctor	Ribeirão Preto	1	30	4th Evicted
Giulliano Ciarelli	26	Football player	Campinas	1	23	3rd Evicted
Marcos Maçaneiro	25	Baker	Palhoça	4	16	2nd Evicted
Marielza Santos	47	Housewife	Rio de Janeiro	4	13	Walked
Juliana Brandão	18	Student	Prado	1	9	1st Evicted

== Future appearances ==
In 2015, Grazielli Massafera appeared on Big Brother Brasil 15 as a host in a HOH competition.

In 2025, Grazielli Massafera and Jean Wyllys appeared at the BBB: The Documentary as one of the interviewed housemates.

== Voting history ==
	Week 1	Week 2	Week 3	Week 4	Week 5	Week 6	Week 7	Week 8	Week 9	Week 10	Week 11		Nominations received
	Week 1	Week 2	Week 3	Week 4	Week 5	Week 6	Week 7	Week 8	Week 9	Week 10	Day 76	Finale	Nominations received
Head of Household	Natalia	Sammy	Grazielli	Jean	Tatiane Pink	Tatiana	Grazielli	Karla	Grazielli	Alan	Sammy	(none)	
Power of Immunity	(none)	Marcos	Paulo André	Alan	Alan	Natalia	Aline	Sammy	Karla	Sammy	(none)	(none)	
Saved	(none)	Giulliano	Rogerio	Paulo André	Natalia	Aline	Alan	Tatiane Pink	Jean	Sammy	(none)	(none)	
Nomination (HoH)	Juliana	Marcos	Giulliano	Rogerio	Paulo André	Jean	Tatiana	Grazielli	Karla	Tatiane Pink	Alan	(none)	
Nomination (Housemates)	Jean	Jean	Tatiane Pink	Sammy	Aline	Natalia	Aline	Aline	Alan	Jean	Jean	(none)	
Jean	Rogerio	Paulo André	Paulo André	Head of Household	Alan	Natalia	Aline	Aline	Alan	Not; Eligible	Not; Eligible	Winner (Day 79)	19
Grazielli	Marcos	Rogerio	Head of Household	Karla	Aline	Natalia	Head of Household	Aline	Head of Household	Not; Eligible	Not; Eligible	Runner-Up (Day 79)	10
Sammy	Alan	Head of Household	Aline	Aline	Aline	Natalia	Aline	Aline	Alan	Grazielli	Head of Household	3rd Place (Day 79)	8
Alan	Jean	Jean	Tatiane Pink	Sammy	Aline	Sammy	Karla	Sammy	Tatiane Pink	Jean	Jean	Evicted (Day 77)	8
Tatiane Pink	Giulliano	Rogerio	Alan	Alan	Head of Household	Natalia	Aline	Aline	Alan	Jean	Evicted (Day 72)		13
Karla	Grazielli	Grazielli	Tatiane Pink	Grazielli	Grazielli	Tatiane Pink	Jean	Head of Household	Tatiane Pink	Evicted (Day 65)			3
Aline	Not in House		Sammy	Sammy	Sammy	Tatiane Pink	Jean	Jean	Evicted (Day 58)				13
Tatiana	Jean	Jean	Tatiane Pink	Grazielli	Grazielli	Head of Household	Tatiane Pink	Evicted (Day 51)					2
Natalia	Head of Household	Grazielli	Aline	Sammy	Tatiana	Tatiane Pink	Evicted (Day 44)						4
Paulo André	Jean	Jean	Tatiane Pink	Grazielli	Jean	Evicted (Day 37)							5
Rogerio	Jean	Jean	Tatiane Pink	Sammy	Evicted (Day 30)								4
Giulliano	Jean	Jean	Tatiane Pink	Evicted (Day 23)									2
Marcos	Paulo André	Paulo André	Evicted (Day 16)										3
Marielza	Marcos	Walked (Day 13)											0
Juliana	Jean	Evicted (Day 9)											1
Notes	1	2	(none)							3, 4	5	(none)	
Nominated for Eviction	Jean; Juliana	Jean; Marcos	Giulliano; Tatiane Pink	Rogerio; Sammy	Aline; Paulo André	Jean; Natalia	Aline; Tatiana	Aline; Grazielli	Alan; Karla	Jean; Tatiane Pink	Alan; Jean	Grazielli; Jean; Sammy	
Walked	(none)	Marielza	(none)										
Evicted	Juliana; 50.49% to evict	Marcos; 61% to evict	Giulliano; 87% to evict	Rogerio; 92% to evict	Paulo André; 72% to evict	Natalia; 88% to evict	Tatiana; 62% to evict	Aline; 95% to evict	Karla; 76% to evict	Tatiane Pink; 64% to evict	Alan; 76% to evict	Sammy; 5% to win	
Evicted	Juliana; 50.49% to evict	Marcos; 61% to evict	Giulliano; 87% to evict	Rogerio; 92% to evict	Paulo André; 72% to evict	Natalia; 88% to evict	Tatiana; 62% to evict	Aline; 95% to evict	Karla; 76% to evict	Tatiane Pink; 64% to evict	Alan; 76% to evict	Grazielli; 40% to win	
Evicted	Juliana; 50.49% to evict	Marcos; 61% to evict	Giulliano; 87% to evict	Rogerio; 92% to evict	Paulo André; 72% to evict	Natalia; 88% to evict	Tatiana; 62% to evict	Aline; 95% to evict	Karla; 76% to evict	Tatiane Pink; 64% to evict	Alan; 76% to evict	Jean; 55% to win	

=== Notes ===
- ^Note 1: Extra surprise housemates Marcos and Marielza entered the house on Day 4 and the public was able to choose one of them to be immune. Marielza won the vote with 54%.
- ^Note 2: Marielza had to leave the House after a health problem.
- ^Note 3: Big Brother revealed to the audience that the winner of the ninth and final Power of Immunity competition, instead of give immunity to someone else, would win the immunity. Sammy won the PoI on day 68, but the housemates were only informed about the twist during the live nominations on day 70.
- ^Note 4: With Alan immune as HoH, Sammy as saved by the Power of Immunity and Tati Pink as the HoH's nominee, Jean and Grazielli did not cast votes during nominations as they could only vote for each other. After a 1-1 nominations vote between Jean and Grazielli, Alan, as Head of Household, had the casting vote and chose Jean to be the second nominee.
- ^Note 5: Sammy won the final Head of Household and nominated Alan for eviction. Since Grazielli and Jean's votes would cancel each other out, only Alan was eligible to nominate. He chose Jean to be the second nominee.
