= Big Brother Brasil 12 =

- Season 12
- Logo of Big Brother Brasil used from Season 12.
- Presented by: Pedro Bial
- No. of days: 80
- No. of housemates: 16
- Winner: Rafael "Fael" Cordeiro
- Runner-up: Fabiana Aparecida
- No. of episodes: 80

Release
- Original network: Globo
- Original release: January 10 – March 29, 2012

Season chronology
- ← Previous; Big Brother Brasil 11 Next → Big Brother Brasil 13

Big Brother Brasil 12 was the twelfth season of Big Brother Brasil which premiered January 10, 2012, with the season finale airing March 29, 2012, on the Rede Globo.

The show is produced by Endemol Globo and presented by news reporter Pedro Bial. The season is officially confirmed since 2008 as part of a millionaire contract between international Endemol and Rede Globo, which guaranteed seasons until 2012.

The grand prize was R$1.5 million with tax allowances, with a R$150,000 prize offered to the runner up and a R$50,000 prize offered to the 3rd place. In the end, veterinarian Fael Cordeiro from Aral Moreira, MS, won the competition over poster-girl Fabiana Teixeira with 92% of the final vote.

== Production ==
=== Development and overview ===
The twelfth season of Big Brother Brasil lasted for 80 days. In addition, this season includes new graphics, a new opening sequence and a tuneup in the musical score. It also changed its main housemates names and info font.

=== Cast ===
National applications were due by August 14, 2011 until October 31, 2011. Applicants chosen to be a finalist went to Rio de Janeiro during early November 2011 from which applicants were narrowed down to a pool of 150 finalists.

Final casting interviews took place early to mid-December 2011. The selected group of housemates were put into sequester on January 3, 2012.

=== Pre-season withdrawals controversy ===
==== Netinho ====
Twelve housemates were revealed on January 4. João José "Netinho" Neto, a 28-year-old lawyer from Visconde do Rio Branco walked during the pre-season sequester. At first, Rede Globo, the broadcaster of the program, stated that Netinho walked because he couldn't handle the confinement at the hotel.

The next day, however, Netinho's mother, Maria Ines Carmanini, came out stating that the producers tried to manipulate her son, forbidding him to maintain his daily routine. She also claimed that she couldn't specify the problem, since Netinho had signed a secrecy agreement with the network and such disclosure could harm him. Netinho was replaced on January 5 by Ronaldo Peres, a 31-year-old salesman from São Paulo.

On January 7, in an unexpected turn of events, it was revealed that Netinho would have regretted his decision and asked for another chance in the game. The producers however, denied the request. "Unfortunately, once you're out, you stay out" said Boninho, the main producer of the show. Netinho, on the other hand, denied the information and stated that he didn't have the producers' phone number and is happy with his decision.

==== Fernanda ====
Hours earlier in the day, Fernanda Girão, a 29-year-old businesswoman from Rio de Janeiro, also walked away from the show. Fernanda, who was expected to be one of the season's big characters, had already asked to leave 24 hours before the official announcement. In the first attempt, however, she was persuaded by Boninho to handle the pressure and stay in the game.

At first, the lack of a phone was believed to be the reason for Fernanda's departure. In crisis, she would have asked to call her mother, but the producers didn't allow her to do so. Fernanda also had trouble sleeping. For security reasons, Big Brother Brasil rules prohibits sleeping pills both at the hotel where pre-season sequester occurs and, subsequently, at the Big Brother house. However, in an interview on January 9, Fernanda claimed to have walk to preserve her image after she learned in the hotel, that she was being portrayed by the media as a lesbian (as the girlfriend of the openly lesbian singer Nise Palhares, 3rd place on Ídolos 2010) and a troublemaker.

Fabiana Teixeira, a 35-year-old poster girl from São Paulo, was officially announced on January 9, 2012 as Fernanda's replacement.

== The game ==
The season was a "back to basics" season with a reduced cast, no double evictions, no three-way vote and an unprecedented division in the group. In addition, only the final two housemates faced the public vote on the finale night.

=== Launch night twist ===
On January 8, it was revealed that Big Brother producers called 60 unsuccessful auditioners to make part of the audience at the launch night. All of them had gone through the entire selection process but didn't make to the final cut.

At the launch night, it was revealed that four more housemates would join the cast, bringing the total numbers of finalists to 16. The selection of the remaining finalists, however, was not random. These four new housemates – Analice, Daniel, Fael and Monique – were also chosen to be part of the season back in December 2011 and put into sequester alongside the, at the time believed to be, "original 12".

=== Season 1 challenge revival ===
All housemates competed in an endurance challenge for a chance to win an extra immunity for the first week. The challenge was the first to ever been done on Big Brother Brasil (on the series premiere in 2002) and consisted of all the housemates in a car and winner would be the last person standing. After 30 hours, a new record for the franchise, Kelly beat Jakeline and won the extra immunity, the car and the first Power of No (a new twist of the series).

=== Power of No ===
Like in the previous seasons, each week the housemates compete to become the Head of Household. However, a new twist called the Power of No was awarded in the first seven weeks to one housemate (except Week 3, where two housemates were awarded this power). The winner of the Power of No would be given the opportunity to disqualify up to five people from competing in the Head of Household competition.

In Week 1, the Power of No was given to Kelly as part of her prize for winning the endurance challenge in the season premiere. From Weeks 2–6, the Power of No competition replaced the Monday Game Night (held since season 9) but kept the same format, with elimination-style type of challenges as a way to create drama and conflict between the housemates. In Week 7, the last Power of No was given to Jonas, after he answered the last Big Phone that week.

Week	Power of No	Total vetoed	Previous HoH	Vetoed housemates
1	Kelly	5	—	Fael, João M., Laisa, Monique, Renata
2	Ronaldo	2	João C.	Fabiana, Jakeline
3	Fabiana, Rafa	2	João M.	Fael, Ronaldo
4	João C.	2	Laisa	João M., Yuri
5	Rafa	2	Renata	Fael, Kelly
6	Yuri	1	Laisa	Jonas
7	Jonas	2	Fael	Monique, Rafa

The current Head of Household was also not eligible to compete in the following HoH competition unless only 6 housemates were remaining.

=== Big Phone ===
Although the Big Phone is still part of the game since season 8, in this season only rang 4 out of 14 nominations rounds and none automatic nominations for eviction.

Results
	Week 1	Week 2	Week 3	Week 4	Week 5	Week 6	Week 7
Housemate	(none)		Fael	Laisa	Kelly	(none)	Jonas

=== Housemate exchange ===
From March 8 to March 15, 2012, Laisa Portella was a guest on Gran Hermano 13, where she spent seven days in the Spanish house as part of the Brazilian Week. The following week (March 16 to March 21, 2012), Spanish housemate Noemí Merino, a 25-year-old surfer from Lanzarote, spent five days in the Brazilian house.

== Housemates ==
The cast list was unveiled on January 4, 2012.

(ages stated at time of contest)

Name	Age	Occupation	Hometown	Day entered	Day exited	Result
Fael Cordeiro	25	Veterinarian	Aral Moreira	1	80	Winner
Fabiana Teixeira	35	Poster Girl	Ribeirão Preto	1	80	Runner-up
Jonas Sulzbach	25	Model	Lajeado	1	78	13th Evicted
Kelly Medeiros	25	Sales Assistant	Almenara	1	76	12th Evicted
João Carvalho	46	Trade Representative	Divinópolis	1	71	11th Evicted
Monique Amin	23	Student	Florianópolis	1	69	10th Evicted
Yuri Fernandes	26	Muay Thai Trainer	Goiânia	1	64	9th Evicted
Renata Dávila	21	Psychology Student	Belo Horizonte	1	57	8th Evicted
Rafa Oliveira	35	Lighting Designer	Rio de Janeiro	1	50	7th Evicted
Laisa Portella	23	Medicine Student	Porto Alegre	1	43	6th Evicted
João Mauricio Leite	34	Cattle Breeder	Goiânia	1	36	5th Evicted
Ronaldo Peres	31	Salesman	Jacareí	1	29	4th Evicted
Mayara Medeiros	23	Art Educator	Jales	1	22	3rd Evicted
Jakeline Leal	22	Husbandry Student	Feira de Santana	1	15	2nd Evicted
Analice de Souza	26	Bar Owner	Belo Horizonte	1	8	1st Evicted
Daniel Echaniz	31	Model	São Paulo	1	7	Ejected

== Future appearances ==
In 2013, Yuri Fernandes returned to compete in Big Brother Brasil 13, he finished in 13th place.

In 2015, Kelly Medeiros appeared in A Quinta from Portugal, she won the competition.

In 2017, Yuri Fernandes and Monique Amin appeared in A Fazenda 9, where they placed 6th and 7th respectively.

In 2026, Jonas Sulzbach returned in Big Brother Brasil 26, he finished the competition in 12th place.

== Voting history ==
	Week 1	Week 2	Week 3	Week 4	Week 5	Week 6	Week 7	Week 8	Week 9	Week 10		Week 11		Week 12	Nominations received
	Week 1	Week 2	Week 3	Week 4	Week 5	Week 6	Week 7	Week 8	Week 9	Day 67	Day 70	Day 74	Day 77	Finale	Nominations received
Head of Household	João C.	João M.	Laisa	Renata	Laisa	Fael	Fabiana	Yuri	Kelly	Jonas	Fabiana	Fabiana	Fabiana	(none)	
Power of Immunity	João M.	Jonas	Ronaldo	Rafa	~~Yuri~~	Renata	Rafa	Jonas	Monique	(none)				(none)	
Power of Immunity	João M.	Jonas	Ronaldo	Rafa	Laisa	Renata	Rafa	Jonas	Monique	(none)				(none)	
Saved	Fael	Fabiana	Monique	Monique	~~Monique~~	Rafa	Renata	Kelly	Monique	(none)				(none)	
Saved	Fael	Fabiana	Monique	Monique	Yuri	Rafa	Renata	Kelly	Monique	(none)				(none)	
Nominated (HoH)	Analice	Renata	Mayara	Fabiana	Jonas	Laisa	Rafa	João C.	Yuri	João C.	João C.	Jonas	Fael; Jonas	(none)	
Nominated (Housemates)	Jakeline	Jakeline	Fael	Ronaldo	João M.	João C.	Yuri	Renata	João C.	Monique	Fael	Kelly	Fael; Jonas	(none)	
Fael	Daniel	Ronaldo	Ronaldo	Ronaldo	João C.	Head of Household	Yuri	Renata	João C.	Monique	Kelly	Not; Eligible	Nominated	Winner (Day 80)	11
Fabiana	Renata	Ronaldo	Rafa	Yuri	Rafa	Yuri	Yuri	Renata	João C.	Monique	Fael	Head of Household	Head of Household	Runner-Up (Day 80)	8
Jonas	Jakeline	Yuri	Ronaldo	Ronaldo	João C.	João C.	Yuri	Renata	João C.	Head of Household	Kelly	Kelly	Nominated	Evicted (Day 78)	5
Kelly	Renata	Yuri	Rafa	Ronaldo	Rafa	Yuri	Yuri	Renata	Head of Household	Monique	Fael	Not; Eligible	Evicted (Day 76)		8
João C.	Head of Household	Yuri	Fabiana	João M.	João M.	Jonas	Yuri	Renata	Jonas	Fael	Fael	Evicted (Day 71)			17
Monique	Jakeline	Jakeline	Fael	Laisa	João M.	João C.	Kelly	Jonas	Fabiana	Fael	Evicted (Day 69)				1
Yuri	Jakeline	Jakeline	Fael	João C.	João M.	João C.	Kelly	Head of Household	João C.	Evicted (Day 64)					13
Renata	Fabiana	Fael	Fael	Head of Household	João M.	João C.	Kelly	Fabiana	Evicted (Day 57)						10
Rafa	Jakeline	Jakeline	Kelly	Laisa	Fael	João C.	Kelly	Evicted (Day 50)							5
Laisa	Fabiana	Jakeline	Head of Household	Ronaldo	Head of Household	João C.	Evicted (Day 43)								5
João M.	Renata	Head of Household	Ronaldo	Ronaldo	João C.	Evicted (Day 36)									5
Ronaldo	Jakeline	Jakeline	Fael	Laisa	Evicted (Day 29)										10
Mayara	Jakeline	Jakeline	Fabiana	Evicted (Day 22)											1
Jakeline	Renata	Yuri	Evicted (Day 15)												12
Analice	Laisa	Evicted (Day 8)													1
Daniel	Fabiana	Ejected (Day 7)													1
Notes	1, 2	(none)	3	4	4, 5	6	7, 8, 9	(none)	10	(none)	11	12	13	(none)	
Nominated for Eviction	Analice; Jakeline	Jakeline; Renata	Fael; Mayara	Fabiana; Ronaldo	João M. Jonas	João C. Laisa	Rafa; Yuri	João C. Renata	João C. Yuri	João C. Monique	Fael; João C.	Jonas; Kelly	Fael; Jonas	Fabiana; Fael	
Ejected	Daniel	(none)													
Evicted	Analice; 53% to evict	Jakeline; 50.47% to evict	Mayara; 74% to evict	Ronaldo; 81% to evict	João M. 52% to evict	Laisa; 88% to evict	Rafa; 92% to evict	Renata; 66% to evict	Yuri; 51.23% to evict	Monique; 52% to evict	João C. 86% to evict	Kelly; 57% to evict	Jonas; 54% to evict	Fabiana; 8% to win	
Survived	Jakeline; 47% to evict	Renata; 49.53% to evict	Fael; 26% to evict	Fabiana; 19% to evict	Jonas; 48% to evict	João C. 12% to evict	Yuri; 8% to evict	João C. 34% to evict	João C. 48.77% to evict	João C. 48% to evict	Fael; 14% to evict	Jonas; 43% to evict	Fael; 46% to evict	Fael; 92% to win	

=== Notes ===
- ^Note 1: During the launch night, the housemates competed in an endurance challenge for a chance to win an extra immunity. The challenge consisted of all the housemates in a car and winner would be the last person standing. After 30 hours, Kelly beat Jakeline and won the immunity, the car and the first Power of No. She vetoed five housemates from the first HoH competition (Fael, João M., Laisa, Monique and Renata).
- ^Note 2: Daniel had to leave the house after a rape charge against Monique. He was ejected due to a serious misconduct.
- ^Note 3: Fael answered the Big Phone and had to choose one housemate to receive an extra immunity (João Mauricio).
- ^Note 4: Laisa answered the Big Phone on day 25 and won the Higher Power. Unknown to her fellow housemates, she could overthrow the HoH or the power of immunity and replace the nominations. However, this power could only be used once and within the next two evictions (weeks 4 and 5). Laisa played her Higher Power on week 5 to overthrow the original Power of Immunity holder, Yuri. She decided to change Yuri's decision (Monique) and gave the immunity to Yuri himself.
- ^Note 5: Kelly answered the Big Phone and won an extra immunity. However, she should keep this secret until the vote, so she should put a bracelet on her least favorite housemate (Yuri) as a way to fool everyone.
- ^Note 6: Originally, Yuri won the Head of Household but due to a production error during the semifinal between Yuri and Fabiana (with Fael already in the final after beating João C. in the other semifinal) the HoH was voided and a new final was made between Fabiana and Fael, with Fael ended up winning. As Fael won the original Power of Immunity, but became the Head of Household after the re-do HoH competition, a new PoI competition was also made, with Renata winning the PoI.
- ^Note 7: Jonas answered the Big Phone and won the Power of No. He should put a bracelet on his choices (Monique and Rafa) and keep this as secret until the live show, which would be on the same day.
- ^Note 8: On day 45, host Pedro Bial revealed that Jonas' Power of No would be the last one of the season. From weeks 8 to 10, only the previous week's HoH would be ineligible to compete.
- ^Note 9: Kelly and Yuri received the most nominations with 4 each. Fabiana, as Head of Household, had the casting vote and choose Yuri to be the second nominee.
- ^Note 10: On day 57, Big Brother revealed to the audience that the winner of the ninth and final Power of Immunity competition, instead of give immunity to someone else, would win the immunity. Monique won the PoI on day 61, but the housemates were only informed about the twist during the live nominations on day 62.
- ^Note 11: Fael and Kelly received the most nominations with 2 each. Fabiana, as Head of Household, had the casting vote and choose Fael to be the second nominee.
- ^Note 12: Fabiana won the Head of Household and nominated Jonas for eviction. Since Fael and Kelly's votes would cancel each other out, only Jonas was eligible to nominate. He choose Kelly to be the second nominee.
- ^Note 13: Fabiana won the final Head of Household competition. Therefore, Fael and Jonas were automatically nominated for eviction by default.

== Ratings and reception ==
=== Brazilian ratings ===
All numbers are in points and provided by IBOPE.

- Episodes aired: Mondays to Saturdays (except Wednesdays) at 10:00pm, Wednesdays at 9:45pm and Sundays at 11:00pm.

	Week												
	0	1	2	3	4	5	6	7	8	9	10	11	12
Wed		35	30	31	35	34	34	32	33	36	34	37	31
Thu		32	28	26	26	28	25	27	25	25	26	28	26
Fri		27	28	28	27	28	26	29	27	30	28	30	
Sat		27	29	25	23	23	24	23	24	27	26	24	
Sun		20	16	18	16	17	13	16	16	17	20	17	
Mon		36	28	28	28	28	24	29	28	26	30	27	
Tue	33	31	26	26	25	23	25	25	24	26	27	26	
Weekly average	33	30	26	26	26	27	24	26	25	27	27	27	29
Running average													
Season average	27												

- Each point represents 60.000 households in São Paulo.
