= Big Brother Brasil 3 =

- Season 3
- Presented by: Pedro Bial
- No. of days: 78
- No. of housemates: 15
- Winner: Dhomini Ferreira
- Runner-up: Elane Silva
- No. of episodes: 78

Release
- Original network: Globo
- Original release: January 14 – April 1, 2003

Season chronology
- ← Previous; Big Brother Brasil 2 Next → Big Brother Brasil 4

Big Brother Brasil 3 was the third season of Big Brother Brasil which premiered January 14, 2003, on the Rede Globo.

The show was produced by Endemol Globo and presented by Pedro Bial. The season was officially confirmed since 2001 as part of the original contract between international Endemol and Rede Globo that provided seasons until 2008.

The grand prize was R$500.000 without tax allowances, with a R$50.000 prize offered to the runner-up and a R$30.000 prize offered to the housemate in third place.

The winner was 31-year-old congressional aide Dhomini Ferreira from Goiânia, Goiás.

== Overview ==
There were fourteen Housemates competing for the grand prize, an increase over the two previous seasons. The season lasted 78 days, an increase of one week over the previous season. This season introduced the Power of Immunity.

=== Controversy ===
Among the contestants was the Miss Brasil 2002, Joseane Oliveira. Rules of the Miss Brasil contest forbid participation of married women, and when Joseane participated, she stated she was single. Due to the overexposition in the BBB, some magazines discovered she was married since before winning the beauty contest. The marriage being proved, Joseane was stripped of her crown, and Thaisa Tomsem was crowned Miss Brasil 2002.

Also, contestant Dilson, not knowing Joseane was married, tried to start a romantic relationship with her during the show. Due to her refusals, he felt unmotivated and left the show voluntarily. Harry replaced him at January 26, and became the first contestant not to enter the show at the first day.

=== Reunion show ===
The reunion was hosted by Pedro Bial and aired on April 6, 2003. All the former housemates, except Dilson, attended. Alan ended up winning the "Big Boss Prize" which awarded R$50.000 over Andrea with 86% of the fans' vote.

== Housemates ==
(ages stated at time of contest)

| Name | Age | Occupation | Hometown | Day entered | Day exited | Result |
|---|---|---|---|---|---|---|
| Dhomini Ferreira | 31 | Parliamentary assistant | Goiânia | 1 | 78 | Winner |
| Elane Silva | 18 | Teacher | Itanhém | 1 | 78 | Runner-up |
| Viviane Oliveira | 28 | Lawyer | Votorantim | 1 | 76 | 11th Evicted |
| Jean Massumi | 28 | Massage therapist | São Paulo | 1 | 71 | 10th Evicted |
| Harry Grossman | 34 | Guide | Teresópolis | 13 | 64 | 9th Evicted |
| Sabrina Sato | 22 | Student | Penápolis | 1 | 57 | 8th Evicted |
| Emilio Rodrigues | 30 | Diver | Londrina | 1 | 50 | 7th Evicted |
| Alan Marcelo | 26 | Basketball player | Rio de Janeiro | 1 | 43 | 6th Evicted |
| Juliana Alves | 20 | Student | Rio de Janeiro | 1 | 36 | 5th Evicted |
| Andrea Guerrero | 39 | Advertiser | São Paulo | 1 | 29 | 4th Evicted |
| Marcelo Kretzer | 22 | Disc jockey | Blumenau | 1 | 22 | 3rd Evicted |
| Joseane Oliveira | 21 | Miss Brasil 2002 | Canoas | 1 | 15 | 2nd Evicted |
| Dilson Walkarez | 30 | Biker | Campo Grande | 1 | 12 | Walked |
| Paulo Carotini | 33 | Photographer | São Paulo | 1 | 8 | 1st Evicted |
| Samantha Pereira | 27 | Personal trainer | Rio de Janeiro | 1 | 8 | 1st Evicted |

| Name | Age | Occupation | Hometown | Result |
|---|---|---|---|---|
| Juliana Alves | 20 | Student | Rio de Janeiro | Selected |
| Priscilla Castelan | 20 | Student | São Paulo | Not Selected |
| Luís Fernando | 35 | Dancer | São Paulo | Not Selected |
| Paulo Carotini | 33 | Photographer | São Paulo | Selected |

== Future appearances ==
In 2025, Juliana Alves and Sabrina Sato, appeared at the BBB: The Documentary as one of the interviewed housemates.

| Housemate | Year | Future Appearance | Placements |
|---|---|---|---|
| Joseane Oliveira | 2010 | Big Brother Brasil 10 | 17th place Evicted |
| Dhomini Ferreira | 2013 | Big Brother Brasil 13 | 15th place Evicted |
| Dhomini Ferreira | 2020 | Made in Japão | 7th place Eliminated |
| Dhomini Ferreira | 2025 | Power Couple Brasil 7 | Runner-up with Adriana Leizer |
| Juliana Alves | 2014 | Artista Completão | 6th place Semifinalist |
| Juliana Alves | 2023 | Dança dos Famosos 20 | 9th place Eliminated |

== Voting history ==
| | Week 1 | | Week 2 | Week 3 | Week 4 | Week 5 | Week 6 | Week 7 | Week 8 | Week 9 | Week 10 | Week 11 | |
| | Female | Male | Week 2 | Week 3 | Week 4 | Week 5 | Week 6 | Week 7 | Week 8 | Week 9 | Week 10 | Day 75 | Finale |
|---|---|---|---|---|---|---|---|---|---|---|---|---|---|
| Head of Household | Elane | | Sabrina | Andrea | Juliana | Jean | Elane | Jean | Elane | Jean | Viviane | Dhomini | (none) |
| Power of Immunity | Marcelo | | Dhomini | Juliana | Alan | Dhomini | Dhomini | Dhomini | Jean | Dhomini | (none) | | (none) |
| Saved | Dilson | | Juliana | Elane | Harry | Sabrina | Sabrina | Sabrina | Harry | Dhomini | (none) | | (none) |
| Nomination (HoH) | (none) | Emílio | Joseane | Dhomini | Jean | Juliana | Alan | Viviane | Sabrina | Elane | Jean | Elane; Viviane | (none) |
| Nomination (Housemates) | Juliana; Samantha | Paulo | Andrea | Marcelo | Andrea | Dhomini | Dhomini | Emílio | Dhomini | Harry | Elane | Elane; Viviane | (none) |
| Dhomini | Samantha; Juliana | Not eligible | Andrea | Marcelo | Andrea | Harry | Emílio | Emílio | Jean | Harry | Not eligible | Head of Household | Winner (Day 78) |
| Elane | Head of Household | Paulo | Andrea | Marcelo | Andrea | Dhomini | Head of Household | Emílio | Head of Household | Harry | Not eligible | Nominated | Runner-up (Day 78) |
| Viviane | Not eligible | Paulo | Andrea | Marcelo | Andrea | Emílio | Dhomini | Emílio | Dhomini | Harry | Head of Household | Nominated | Evicted (Day 76) |
| Jean | Samantha; Juliana | Not eligible | Andrea | Juliana | Dhomini | Head of Household | Dhomini | Head of Household | Dhomini | Head of Household | Elane | Evicted (Day 71) | |
| Harry | Not in House | | | Viviane | Viviane | Dhomini | Dhomini | Dhomini | Dhomini | Viviane | Evicted (Day 64) | | |
| Sabrina | Not eligible | Paulo | Head of Household | Marcelo | Andrea | Harry | Emílio | Harry | Viviane | Evicted (Day 57) | | | |
| Emílio | Samantha; Juliana | Not eligible | Andrea | Juliana | Elane | Dhomini | Dhomini | Elane | Evicted (Day 50) | | | | |
| Alan | Samantha; Juliana | Not eligible | Andrea | Jean | Andrea | Dhomini | Emílio | Evicted (Day 43) | | | | | |
| Juliana | Not eligible | Paulo | Marcelo | Marcelo | Head of Household | Harry | Evicted (Day 36) | | | | | | |
| Andrea | Not eligible | Paulo | Dhomini | Head of Household | Elane | Evicted (Day 29) | | | | | | | |
| Marcelo | Samantha; Juliana | Not eligible | Andrea | Juliana | Evicted (Day 22) | | | | | | | | |
| Joseane | Not eligible | Paulo | Dhomini | Evicted (Day 15) | | | | | | | | | |
| Dilson | Samantha; Juliana | Not eligible | Walked (Day 12) | | | | | | | | | | |
| Paulo | Samantha; Juliana | Not eligible | Evicted (Day 8) | | | | | | | | | | |
| Samantha | Not eligible | Paulo | Evicted (Day 8) | | | | | | | | | | |
| Notes | 1 | | 2 | (none) | | | | | | 3 | 4 | 5 | 6 |
| Walked | (none) | | Dilson | (none) | | | | | | | | | |
| Nominated for Eviction | Juliana; Samantha | Emílio; Paulo | Andrea; Joseane | Dhomini; Marcelo | Andrea; Jean | Dhomini; Juliana | Alan; Dhomini | Emílio; Viviane | Dhomini; Sabrina | Elane; Harry | Elane; Jean | Elane; Viviane | Dhomini; Elane |
| Evicted | Samantha; 79% to evict | Paulo; 55% to evict | Joseane; 64% to evict | Marcelo; 59% to evict | Andrea; 57% to evict | Juliana; 65% to evict | Alan; 57% to evict | Emílio; 76% to evict | Sabrina; 60% to evict | Harry; 67% to evict | Jean; 67% to evict | Viviane; 59% to evict | Elane; 49% to win |
| Evicted | Samantha; 79% to evict | Paulo; 55% to evict | Joseane; 64% to evict | Marcelo; 59% to evict | Andrea; 57% to evict | Juliana; 65% to evict | Alan; 57% to evict | Emílio; 76% to evict | Sabrina; 60% to evict | Harry; 67% to evict | Jean; 67% to evict | Viviane; 59% to evict | Dhomini; 51% to win |

=== Notes ===
- ^Note 1: On week 1, there were two separate rounds of nominations - one in which males nominated the females, and one in which the females nominated the males, leading up to the first double eviction in BBB history with a female and a male evictees leaving the House together. This week's HoH Elane while immune from being nominated by the males, could only use her powers during the female nominations. On day 5, as HoH, Elane nominated Emílio. Then, the males in consensus had to nominate one woman to face the public vote: Samantha. On day 6, the women in consensus decided to nominate Paulo, while the men had to choose another woman to be nominated alongside Samantha: Juliana.
- ^Note 2: Big Brother revealed to the viewers that the winner of the final Power of Immunity competition, instead of give immunity to someone else, would win the immunity. Dhomini won the PoI, but the housemates were only informed about the twist during the live nominations.
- ^Note 3: Already nominated by the Head of Household, Jean was the only person to vote, since Viviane had immunity and Dhomini and Elane's votes would cancel each other out.
- ^Note 4: Dhomini won the final Head of Household competition. Therefore, Elane and Viviane were automatically nominated for eviction by default.
- ^Note 5: For the finale, the public voted for the finalist they want to win Big Brother Brasil 3.
