= Big Brother Brasil 2 =

- Season 2
- Presented by: Pedro Bial
- No. of days: 71
- No. of housemates: 12
- Winner: Rodrigo Leonel
- Runner-up: Manuela Saadeh
- No. of episodes: 71

Release
- Original network: Globo
- Original release: May 14 – July 23, 2002

Season chronology
- ← Previous; Big Brother Brasil 1 Next → Big Brother Brasil 3

Big Brother Brasil 2 was the second season of Big Brother Brasil which premiered May 14, 2002, on Rede Globo.

The show was produced by Endemol Globo and presented by Pedro Bial. The season was officially confirmed since 2001 as part of the original contract between international Endemol and Rede Globo that provided seasons until 2008.

The grand prize was R$500.000 without tax allowances, with a R$50.000 prize offered to the runner-up and a R$30.000 prize offered to the housemate in third place.

The winner was 32-year-old cowboy Rodrigo Leonel from Ribeirão Preto, São Paulo.

== Overview ==
For the first time, two seasons were filmed and aired back-to-back in the same year and the only season to air in the South American winter. It's also the first time the final vote included two housemates.

=== Reunion show ===
The reunion was hosted by Pedro Bial and aired on July 28, 2002. All the former housemates attended.

The men had choose two women (the women would do the same with the men) to compete for a spot in the final vote for the "Big Boss Prize", which awarded R$50.000. Rita and Moisés (who won their rounds against Thaís and Fabrício with 65% and 84% of the votes respectively) competed in the final vote, with Moisés ended up beating Rita with 79% of the fans' vote.

== Housemates ==
(ages stated at time of contest)

Name	Age	Occupation	Hometown	Day entered	Day exited	Result
Rodrigo Leonel	32	Cowboy	Ribeirão Preto	1	71	Winner
Manuela Saadeh	23	Student	Rio de Janeiro	1	71	Runner-up
Cida Moraes	39	Flight attendant	Rio de Janeiro	1	69	10th Evicted
Thyrso Mattos	26	Chef	São Paulo	1	64	9th Evicted
Tarciana Mafra	27	Saleswoman	Recife	1	57	8th Evicted
Fabrício Amaral	25	Student	Novo Hamburgo	1	50	7th Evicted
Thaís Pugliese	19	Student	Niterói	1	43	6th Evicted
Moisés da Silva	26	Salesman	Porto de Galinhas	1	36	5th Evicted
Jeferson Santos	28	Singer	Carapicuíba	1	29	4th Evicted
Fernando Fernandes	21	Boxer	São Paulo	1	22	3rd Evicted
Tina Soares	22	Football player	São Paulo	1	15	2nd Evicted
Rita Sinara	30	Fortune-teller	Rio de Janeiro	1	8	1st Evicted

== Future appearances ==
Housemate	Year	Future Appearance	Placements
Fernando Fernandes	2023	The Masked Singer Brasil 3	11th place Eliminated as Circus

In 2025, Fernando Fernandes, Rodrigo Leonel and Tina Soares, appeared at the BBB: The Documentary as one of the interviewed housemates.

== Voting history ==
	Week 1	Week 2	Week 3	Week 4	Week 5	Week 6	Week 7	Week 8	Week 9	Week 10	
	Week 1	Week 2	Week 3	Week 4	Week 5	Week 6	Week 7	Week 8	Week 9	Day 68	Finale
Head of Household	Jeferson	Rodrigo	Cida	Fabrício	Manuela	Cida	Tarciana	Thyrso	Rodrigo	Manuela	(none)
Nomination (HoH)	Cida	Tarciana	Fernando	Cida	Moisés	Thaís	Thyrso	Tarciana	Thyrso	(none)	(none)
Nomination (Housemates)	Rita	Tina	Thyrso	Jeferson	Cida	Manuela	Fabrício	Rodrigo	Cida	Cida; Rodrigo	(none)
Rodrigo	Rita	Head of Household	Jeferson	Jeferson	Cida	Manuela	Cida	Manuela	Head of Household	Nominated	Winner (Day 71)
Manuela	Rita	Tina	Jeferson	Jeferson	Head of Household	Rodrigo	Fabrício	Rodrigo	Not eligible	Head of Household	Runner-up (Day 71)
Cida	Thaís	Jeferson	Head of Household	Thaís	Fabrício	Head of Household	Fabrício	Rodrigo	Not eligible	Nominated	Evicted (Day 69)
Thyrso	Rita	Tina	Jeferson	Jeferson	Thaís	Tarciana	Fabrício	Rodrigo	Cida	Evicted (Day 64)	
Tarciana	Tina	Tina	Thyrso	Thyrso	Cida	Manuela	Head of Household	Manuela	Evicted (Day 57)		
Fabrício	Thyrso	Tina	Thyrso	Head of Household	Cida	Manuela	Manuela	Evicted (Day 50)			
Thaís	Tina	Tina	Thyrso	Thyrso	Cida	Manuela	Evicted (Day 43)				
Moisés	Rita	Tina	Thyrso	Manuela	Cida	Evicted (Day 36)					
Jeferson	Head of Household	Tina	Thyrso	Manuela	Evicted (Day 29)						
Fernando	Rita	Tina	Thyrso	Evicted (Day 22)							
Tina	Rita	Jeferson	Evicted (Day 15)								
Rita	Moises	Evicted (Day 8)									
Notes	(none)							1	2	3	4
Nominated for eviction	Cida; Rita	Tarciana; Tina	Fernando; Thyrso	Cida; Jeferson	Cida; Moisés	Manuela; Thaís	Fabrício; Thyrso	Rodrigo; Tarciana	Cida; Thyrso	Cida; Rodrigo	Manuela; Rodrigo
Evicted	Rita; 55% to evict	Tina; 63% to evict	Fernando; 77% to evict	Jeferson; 62% to evict	Moisés; 54% to evict	Thaís; 73% to evict	Fabrício; 64% to evict	Tarciana; 70% to evict	Thyrso; 53% to evict	Cida; 59% to evict	Manuela; 35% to win
Evicted	Rita; 55% to evict	Tina; 63% to evict	Fernando; 77% to evict	Jeferson; 62% to evict	Moisés; 54% to evict	Thaís; 73% to evict	Fabrício; 64% to evict	Tarciana; 70% to evict	Thyrso; 53% to evict	Cida; 59% to evict	Rodrigo; 65% to win

=== Notes ===
- ^Note 1: Manuela and Rodrigo received the most nominations with 2 each. Thyrso, as current Head of Household, had the casting vote and chose Rodrigo to be the second nominee.
- ^Note 2: Already nominated by the Head of Household, Thyrso was the only person to vote, since Rodrigo had immunity and Cida and Manuela's votes would cancel each other out.
- ^Note 3: Manuela won the final Head of Household competition. Therefore, Cida and Rodrigo were automatically nominated for eviction by default.
- ^Note 4: For the finale, the public voted for the finalist they want to win Big Brother Brasil 2.
