= Audience of Babilônia =

As a kind of "tradition", the most watched Brazilian TV program annually is 9PM telenovela of Rede Globo. For the 2015-16 season, will be released two novelas for this time, with a minimum target of 35 points. The first, Babilônia (English title: Babylon) is written by Gilberto Braga, Ricardo Linhares and João Ximenes Braga, and has been broadcasting since Monday, March 16, 2015, at 9:30 p.m. / 10:45 p.m. (BRT/AMT).

== Table ==
WEEK	MON	TUE	WED	THU	FRI	SAT	WEEK AVERAGE	MONTH AVERAGE
16/03/2015 to 21/03/2015	33	30	29	29	26	23	28.3 points	MARCH; 25.5; POINTS
23/03/2015 to 28/03/2015	29	26	25	25	25	22	25.3 points	MARCH; 25.5; POINTS
30/03/2015 to 04/04/2015	24	25	23	23	23	20	23.0 points	MARCH; 25.5; POINTS
06/04/2015 to 11/04/2015	26	26	25	25	24	21	24.5 points	APRIL; 25.3; POINTS
13/04/2015 to 18/04/2015	25	24	23	24	24	22	23.6 points	APRIL; 25.3; POINTS
20/04/2015 to 25/04/2015	24	28	26	27	25	24	25.6 points	APRIL; 25.3; POINTS
27/04/2015 to 02/05/2015	28	29	29	27	26	26	27.5 points	APRIL; 25.3; POINTS
04/05/2015 to 09/05/2015	29	27	25	27	25	23	26.0 points	MAY ** POINTS
11/05/2015 to 16/05/2015	27	27	25	25	24	24	25.3 points	MAY ** POINTS
18/05/2015 to 23/05/2015	28	29	24	27	25	23	26.0 points	MAY ** POINTS
25/05/2015 to 30/05/2015	28	24	24	25	23	23	24.5 points	MAY ** POINTS
01/06/2015 to 06/06/2015	28	26	23	23	23	21	24.0 points	JUNE ** POINTS
08/06/2015 to 13/06/2015	23	27	24	25	23	21	23.8 points	JUNE ** POINTS
15/06/2015 to 20/06/2015	26	23	22	27	24	19	23.5 points	JUNE ** POINTS
22/06/2015 to 27/06/2015	25	26	25	25	23	21	24.1 points	JUNE ** POINTS

== Audience ==
=== March ===
Debut—In his debut, Babilônia has acquired an Ibope Rating of 31 points in the preliminary numbers, representing the worst debut of a 9PM telenovela in all time. However, in the final numbers, this index increased two points, and the debut recorded 33 points, with 50% share. At the same time, Carrossel (SBT - 8 points) and Vitória (Record - 6 points), had a good performance. This represents that 6.534 million viewers watched this chapter in Greater São Paulo. Compared to the two predecessors, the debut index surpassed Império (32 points) and tied with Em Família (33 points).

In Rio, the debut recorded 35 points of average, surpassing its two predecessors Império and Em Família (both with 34 points). This represents that 4,884 million people watched.

In Salvador, the audience was 40 points, one of the highest ratings of debut nationwide.

First week—In the second chapter, recorded 29.8 (30) points, down 9%. Fell short of its predecessor, Império (35 points), but overcame Em Família (29 points). In the third and fourth chapter, the ratings continued to fall, registering 29 points. In the same period, SBT, with a rerun of Carrossel, had a great performance, registering 12.5 and 12.6 respectively. On Friday and Saturday, the audience remained low, recording 26 and 23 points respectively. At the end of the first week, Babilônia lost a third of its public.

Greater São Paulo most watched programs on March 25, 2015
Pos.	Program	Ibope Rating
1	Big Brother Brasil 15	27.8
2	Alto Astral	25.3
3	Babilônia	24.9
4	Jornal Nacional	24.9
5	Wednesday Football Night	22.9
6	SPTV (2nd Edition)	22.6
7	Sete Vidas	19.4
8	O Rei do Gado (repeat)	19.4

Second week—In the second week, the audience continued to fall in São Paulo. On March 23, in the preliminary numbers, Babilônia recorded 23.3 points, one of the worst audiences of all time. Before, the Jornal Nacional recorded 20 points. But the next day, the Ibope reported that there was an error in the measurement in real time and adjusted the numbers of the attractions displayed after 6PM (access prime). There was an increase of 6 points between the preliminary and final numbers: 29 points. In Rio, the performance was better: 35 points. On Tuesday (24), fell by 3 points, and recorded 26. On Wednesday (25), soccer day on television, where the duration of the telenovela is shorter, Babilônia recorded 24.9 points in the preliminary numbers, against 25.2 of Alto Astral (7PM telenovela) and 27.8 of Big Brother Brasil 15, being one of the rare times in the Brazilian television history that 9PM telenovela is not the most watched program of the day. Throughout the week, the numbers remained stable.

=== April ===
Third week—On Monday (3/30), recorded 24 points, an historically low rating for the time slot.
