= Conversa com Bial =

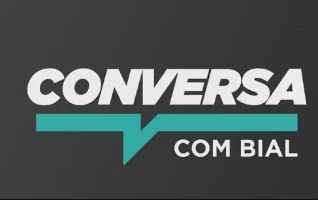
- Genre: Talk show
- Directed by: Fellipe Awi; Mairo Fischer
- Presented by: Pedro Bial
- Country of origin: Brazil
- Original language: Portuguese
- No. of seasons: 9

Production
- Running time: 45 minutes

Original release
- Network: Rede Globo; GNT
- Release: 2 May 2017 – 12 December 2025 (planned)

Conversa com Bial (English: Talk with Bial) is a Brazilian late-night talk show hosted by journalist and former Big Brother presenter Pedro Bial. The show premiered on May 2, 2017, on Rede Globo, and features interviews with a range of guests including artists, politicians, and celebrities. In addition to the interviews, the show also includes music performances and comedy sketches.

Despite renewing Pedro Bial's contract in 2025, Globo was already considering ending the program after evaluating its low financial return, linked to constant schedule changes in broadcast TV programming, airing later and later in the early hours of the morning and, consequently, damaging its ratings (forcing it to be shown on GNT before airing on Globo), in addition to the lack of relevant guests. The issue came to light in October when the program was not mentioned in Upfront 2026. The broadcaster would later confirm the end of Conversa and Bial's transfer to a new format under discussion, but now on a weekly basis. The last episode is scheduled to air on December 12, 2025, and the slot will be filled by themed holiday films and, later, by telenovela reruns.
