= Big Brother Brasil =

Brazilian reality television show

Coordinates: 22°57′24″S 43°24′32″W

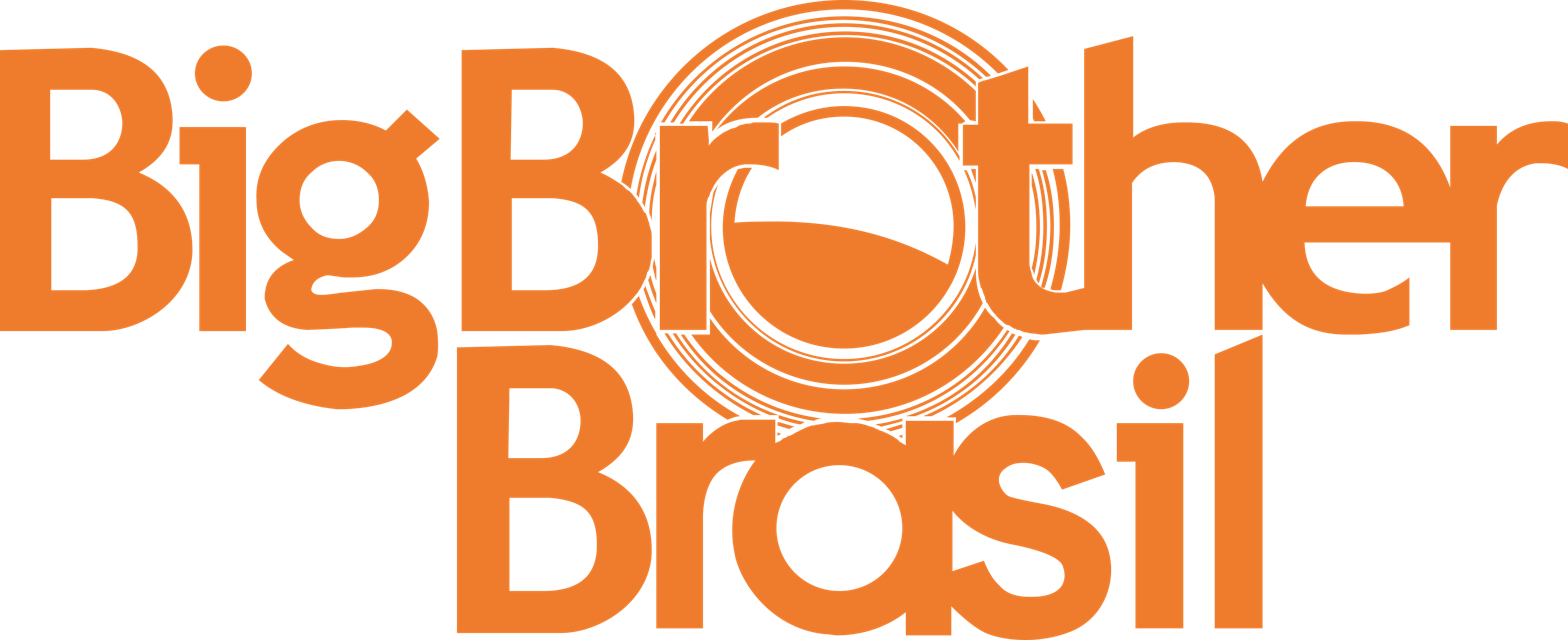
- Also known as: BBB
- Genre: Reality competition
- Based on: Big Brother by John de Mol Jr.
- Directed by: Rodrigo Dourado (general); Pedro Carvana; Mario Meirelles; Mila Abrahão; Mario Marcondes; Vitor Campos; Fábio Brandão; Grasielle Bitencourt; Ana Paula Morais; Patricia Félix; Warllem Machado; Vanessa Rabello
- Creative director: Boninho
- Presented by: Marisa Orth; Pedro Bial; Tiago Leifert; Tadeu Schmidt
- Opening theme: "Vida Real" by RPM
- Country of origin: Brazil
- Original language: Portuguese
- No. of seasons: 26
- No. of episodes: 2206 (up to the 26th edition)

Production
- Production locations: Rio de Janeiro, Rio de Janeiro
- Running time: 25–60 minutes
- Production company: Estúdios Globo

Original release
- Network: TV Globo
- Release: 29 January 2002 – present

Related
- Big Brother Canada; Big Brother (British TV series); Big Brother (American TV series); Big Brother franchise

Big Brother Brasil (Note: (English: Big Brother Brazil) commonly abbreviated to BBB.) is the Brazilian version of the Big Brother reality franchised television show based on the original Dutch television series of the same name, that was created in 1997 by John de Mol Jr.. It is the second one with more finished seasons (only after the American version) and the only one with more than 20 years of uninterrupted annual transmission in the same channel.

The show is based on a group of strangers, known as housemates, living together twenty-four hours a day in the Big Brother house, isolated from the outside world (primarily from mass media, such as newspapers, telephones, television and the internet) while having all their steps followed by cameras around-the-clock, with no privacy for three months.

The housemates compete for the chance to win the grand prize by avoiding weekly eviction, until the last housemate remains at the end of the season that can claim the grand prize. The show's current host is journalist Tadeu Schmidt.

TV Globo's website and a Globo-owned pay-per-view channel offer round-the-clock coverage. Sabrina Sato (season 3) used to be one of the hosts of Panico na TV and now hosts her own TV program, Juliana Alves (season 3) and Grazi Massafera (season 5) are soap opera actresses at TV Globo, Íris Stefanelli and Flávia Viana (season 7) were reporters for many years in a show called TV Fama. The five can be considered the most successful contestants of the show, although none of them have won the show. The only three winners who enjoyed success after the show are Jean Wyllys, who had been following a political career as a federal deputy since winning the fifth season until leaving Brazil in 2019. Thelma Assis, who became a TV presenter for the station, in addition to having contracts with several brands. And Juliette Freire who became an internet phenomenon by reaching 24 million Instagram followers during the show's 21st season. After the show, she devoted herself to building a successful music career.

The twentieth season of the show had the biggest participation in the world of votings in an eviction, reaching over 1.5 billion votes. The previous record, also achieved by Big Brother Brasil in the same season, was 416 million votes. Advertising quotas reached R$78 million, with a total collection of R$530 million.

== The House ==
The Big Brother Brasil house is located inside Estúdios Globo, the Globo's production center in Rio de Janeiro. The house is considered by most Big Brother specialists as the biggest and most extravagant house of all Big Brothers.

The external area of the house is approximately 700 square meters (m^{2}) while the internal areas is about 200 m^{2}. The house has three bedrooms (two for the regular contestants and one for week's Head of Household), a living room, two bathrooms (one inside a bedroom), a big garden, two kitchens (one for the Haves and another for the Have-nots), a gym, a Jacuzzi, a pool, a laundry room, a Diary Room and a separate area, called "another dimension", which was once the white bedroom (ninth and tenth seasons) and the surprise bedroom (eleventh season).

== Show format ==
=== Launch night ===
On the night of the Live Launch several members of the public, who have passed through several audition processes, enter the House to become Housemates of the Big Brother House. Once inside the house the Housemates will live together and have no contact with the outside world.

=== Head of Household (Líder) ===
Except in the first week, after each eviction (Portuguese: paredão, a term which literally means "big wall"), housemates compete to become the "Head of Household" (líder), by winning a weekly physical endurance challenge, based on a specific skill, a general knowledge quiz or, even sometimes through a luck event.

The Líder receives perks such as their own private bedroom, photos or gifts from home, and maid service. The Líder is awarded immunity from the week's nomination (except in the fifteenth and sixteenth seasons where instead the Líder won a cash prize) and also has the power to directly nominate one housemate for eviction, in addition, the Líder is the tiebreaker for the house's nomination vote. Although one housemate normally retains the Leader rewards and responsibilities for the week, exceptions have occurred.

In a "double eviction" week, the first Líder only reigns for a short period (between an hour and three days) while the second Líder reigns for the rest of the week. When this occurs, the first Líder is normally not provided the perks awarded in a normal eviction week. Another exception is when two housemates share the Líder position, such as in the third week of the sixth season and in the first week of the seventh season.

=== Power of Immunity ===
In the third season, a weekly "Power of Immunity" (anjo, a term which literally means "angel") is introduced and determined. This housemate may choose any other housemate to protect from facing the eviction. However, in the seventh season, another selected house mate was given the "Power of Veto" to nullify the saving power.

Since the eighth season, Power of Immunity winner was also given a bad side (called monstro, a term which literally means "monster"), where that housemate, besides protecting someone from elimination, must "punish" one or more contestants, obliging them to do an unpleasing task or forbidding them to go to the party.

=== Estaleca or food competition ===
On Sundays, a competition allow the housemates to win food (until the fourth season) or estalecas (from the fifth season onwards) for the week. Most competitions are games of skill, although the housemates may work individually, in teams, or as one group.

Introduced in the fifth season, the "Estaleca" (Z$) is the official currency of the house. Each contestant has their own credit card with a set amount of Estalecas. Contestants may use their currency to purchase food for the house.

The winners of the week's Estaleca competition earn the right to do all the shopping, choosing what the entire house will eat for the upcoming week. As in the real stock market, the Estalecas can suffer some speculative attacks and thus the value of the groceries may inflate or deflate.

=== Sunday live nominations ===
First the PoI winner and HoH nominate their choices for their respective abilities. Then, each one of the remaining contestants go into the Diary Room, and vote on the contestant they wish to face an elimination match. The highest voted contestant is sent to the elimination match to face the person nominated by the HoH and an audience poll starts (either by telephone, SMS or Internet) to pick which of the nominated contestants shall be eliminated.

Since the twenty season, the nominated housemates compete against each other for one last chance to save themselves from eviction. The housemates nominated by the HoH are not eligible to compete and are guaranteed to face Brazil's vote.

=== Tuesday live eviction ===
On Eviction Night, the poll result is shown and the highest voted housemate is eliminated and evicted from the house. The evicted housemate must to get ready to leave immediately. Once they leave the House they are greeted by the live crowd and the show host.

=== Live Final and the winner ===
In the Live Final, only two to three housemates remain in the house, after surviving numerous evictions. The public are then asked to vote for their favourite surviving Housemate to win the prize. The winner is announced and the final three surviving housemates leaving the house together, treated to a cheering crowd.

=== Spin-offs ===
During each edition, Multishow broadcasts A Eliminação, an aftershow featuring a recap of the previous week, and an interview with the latest housemate to be evicted. Gshow Multishow, and Globoplay air Mesacast BBB (lit. BBB Tablecast, formerly Fora de Casa), a daily show hosted by former contestant Ana Clara Lima.

During the 22nd season, Globo introduced the spin-off programming block Cinema do Lider (lit. Leader's Cinema, now Cine BBB) following Big Brother Brasil on Wednesday nights beginning 26 January 2022. It airs films available on the Globoplay streaming service, with the HoH able to invite fellow housemates to a private cinema to view the films aired by the block. The block was originally intended to fill a timeslot that was intended for the broadcast TV premiere of Filhas de Eva, which had been delayed due to slow advertising sales.

== Season details ==
Season	Housemates	Days	Winner	Vote	Runner-up	Vote	Third place	Vote	Notes
BBB 1	12	64	Kleber de Paula	68% (out of 3)	Vanessa Pascale	21% (out of 3)	André Gabeh	11% (out of 3)	This was the only season where nominations were not done live. This was also the only season with Marisa Orth as co-host, who left her hosting duties early in the season but continued making appearances and providing colour commentary.
BBB 2	12	71	Rodrigo Leonel	65% (out of 2)	Manuela Saadeh	35% (out of 2)	Cida Moraes		This was the first and only time that two seasons were filmed and aired back-to-back in the same calendar year, and the only season to air in the winter. This was also the first time the final vote included only two housemates.
BBB 3	15	78	Dhomini Ferreira	51% (out of 2)	Elane Silva	49% (out of 2)	Viviane Oliveira		Introduced the Power of Immunity. It's the first season to have a housemate, Dilson Walkarez, voluntary quit the game. It's the last season where the weekly nomination process was split into two different days (Saturday and Sunday). It's also the first time there was a double eviction night.
BBB 4	14	85	Cida dos Santos	69% (out of 2)	Thiago Lira	31% (out of 2)	Juliana Lopes		For the first time, two housemates were selected by a random draw at the launch night. It's the first season where the nomination process was completely done on Sunday night. It's also the last season to feature the original R$500,000 grand prize.
BBB 5	15	79	Jean Wyllys	55% (out of 3)	Grazielli Massafera	40% (out of 3)	Sammy Ueda	5% (out of 3)	Increased the grand prize to R$1 million. The only time a season started on a Monday, instead of a Tuesday night. It's the first season in which a housemate, Marielza Santos, was evacuated from the game due to medical conditions.
BBB 6	14	78	Mara Viana	47% (out of 3)	Mariana Felício	34% (out of 3)	Rafael Valente	19% (out of 3)	For the first time, two housemates shared the Power of Immunity and the first time two housemates shared a Head of Household. Additionally, twins secretly swapped in and out of the house, pretending to be a housemate and the same person, in a bid to win R$10,000.
BBB 7	17	85	Diego Gasques	91% (out of 2)	Carollini Honório	9% (out of 2)	Bruna Tavares		It's the first season in which a housemate, Fernando Orozco, was ejected from the game. Introduced the Power of Veto, in which the holder could nullify the Power of Immunity and the first time the public was able to vote for one evicted housemate to return. It's also the first time that Big Brother Brasil allows the ex-housemate from another country's Big Brother to stay in the house.
BBB 8	14	78	Rafinha Ribeiro	50.15% (out of 2)	Gyselle Soares	49.85% (out of 2)	Natália Casassola		Introduced the Big Phone. It's the first time three housemates were up for eviction at the same time. The only time in which a housemate was automatically nominated after came last in a Head of Household competition (Thatiana Bione on Week 7).
BBB 9	20	85	Maximiliano Porto	34.85% (out of 3)	Priscila Pires	34.61% (out of 3)	Francine Piaia	30.54% (out of 3)	Featured the house separated into two areas: rich and poor. Introduced two new twists: the Glass House and the White Room, with the latter culminating in Leonardo Jancu's withdrawal on Week 3. It's the last season to have a R$1 million prize.
BBB 10	17	78	Marcelo Dourado	60% (out of 3)	Fernanda Cardoso	29% (out of 3)	Cadu Parga	11% (out of 3)	Increased the prize to R$1.5 million. Divided the house into cliques, whereas an entire clique was safe from eviction if one of their members becomes Head of Household. Introduced the Higher Power that could overthrow the Head of Household or the house vote. It's the first time, former housemates returned to the house.
BBB 11	19	78	Maria Melillo	43% (out of 3)	Wesley Schunk	31% (out of 3)	Daniel Rolim	26% (out of 3)	Featured the Saboteur, whose mission was to perform various tasks to disrupt the life in the house in order to win R$10,000. Introduced the Horror Room.
BBB 12	16	80	Fael Cordeiro	92% (out of 2)	Fabiana Teixeira	8% (out of 2)	Jonas Sulzbach		Noted as a "Back to Basics" season by both Globo and the production team. Introduced the Power of No, in which aims to veto housemates from Head of Household competition.
BBB 13	21	78	Fernanda Keulla	62.79% (out of 3)	Nasser Rodrigues	28.29% (out of 3)	Andressa Ganacin	8.92% (out of 3)	Featured six housemates from previous seasons returning to play again, including two former winners. Divided the house in Veterans vs. Newbies. It's the first time that a Head of Household was chosen by popular vote through fake eviction (Big Brother Back and Forth).
BBB 14	20	78	Vanessa Mesquita	53% (out of 3)	Angela Munhoz	28% (out of 3)	Clara Aguilar	19% (out of 3)	First time that 20 housemates entered the house on Day 1. It's the first time that 6 housemates were evicted in 2 weeks. Housemates' relatives (mothers and aunts) entered the house and stayed for five days. And the first time that the finalists were of the same gender (female).
BBB 15	15	78	Cézar Lima	65% (out of 2)	Amanda Djehdian	35% (out of 2)	Fernando Medeiros		For the first time that the Head of Household earned cash for each leadership (R$10,000). However, it has no immunity in the nominations. Introduced the "You're in control" task where the public can interfere in the game progress.
BBB 16	16	78	Munik Nunes	6 of 6 points (61.59%) (out of 2)	Maria Claudia Macedo	0 of 6 points (38.41%) (out of 2)	Ronan Veiga		For the first time, four housemates shared a Head of Household. Consequently, it's the first time that a Head of Household was nominated in the same week (Daniel Manzieri on Week 1) since this possibility came into being in BBB 15. Also, it is the first time that a Head of Household was evicted (Tamiel Jacobson on Week 6). Starting in Week 5, the voting system was changed for the first time since the show debut in 2002. The housemate who achieves a simple majority of votes in each region of Brazil (Midwest, Northeast, North, Southeast and South) and telephone/SMS gets a point, a total of 6 points.
BBB 17	17	81	Emilly Araújo	58% (out of 3)	Vivian Amorim	41% (out of 3)	Ieda Wobeto	1% (out of 3)	It's the first season to return to the original voting system and the first season hosted by Tiago Leifert. It's the first time to feature two doubles of twins competing for the two final spots of the season.
BBB 18	20	88	Gleici Damasceno	57.28% (out of 3)	Kaysar Dadour	39.33% (out of 3)	Ana Clara Lima & Ayrton Lima	3.39% (out of 3)	It's the first time to feature two members of the same family competing as a single housemate. And also for the first time, the BBB had three winning women in a row.
BBB 19	17	88	Paula von Sperling	61.09% (out of 2)	Alan Possamai	38.91% (out of 2)	Carolina Peixinho		For the first time ever, the season featured the biggest number of housemates nominated for eviction at the same time: 14. It's the first time a housemate was evicted through a house eviction vote. Also, the first time two housemates were ejected from the house in the same season, one of them already being a finalist. The first time BBB had four winning women in a row.
BBB 20	20	98	Thelma Assis	44.10% (out of 3)	Rafa Kalimann	34.81% (out of 3)	Manu Gavassi	21.09% (out of 3)	The first time BBB had five same gender winning in a row (women). Longest season ever with 98 days of confinement. Divided the house in Celebrities vs. Civilians. This season also broke a world record of "Most Public Votes Received by a Television Program", registered in the Guinness Book Records. 1,532,944,337 votes were cast during the eviction nomination of Felipe Prior, Manu Gavassi and Mari Gonzalez.
BBB 21	20	100	Juliette Freire	90.15% (out of 3)	Camilla de Lucas	5.23% (out of 3)	Fiuk	4.62% (out of 3)	The first time BBB had six same gender winning in a row (women). Longest season ever with 100 days of confinement. Divided the house in Celebrities vs. Civilians. This season had the highest rejection of all the seasons. Karol Conká was evicted with 99.17% of the votes.
BBB 22	22	100	Arthur Aguiar	68.96% (out of 3)	Paulo André Camilo	29.91% (out of 3)	Douglas Silva	1.13% (out of 3)	Tadeu Schmidt assumes the presentation of the program. For the first time the BBB had a final composed only of men and also only members of the group "Celebrities".
BBB 23	22	100	Amanda Meirelles	68.90% (out of 3)	Aline Wirley	16.96% (out of 3)	Bruna Griphao	14.14% (out of 3)	It's the second time two housemates were ejected from the house in the same season. For the first time ever, the public was able to vote for two evicteds housemates to return.
BBB 24	26	100	Davi Brito	60.52% (out of 3)	Matteus Amaral	24.50% (out of 3)	Isabelle Nogueira	14.98% (out of 3)	It is the edition with the most housemates, with a total of 26 (and 5 more unofficials who did not enter). There was also a third group, "Annexes", made up of 8 more people who joined the cast of 18 housemates. Starting this season, the voting system was changed. In addition to having unlimited votes online, named "Fan Vote", the viewers would have the option to vote only once on a separate platform, using their CPF, where they would only be allowed to cast one vote per round. Each of these systems would have a weighted average of 50% in the final result of the vote.
BBB 25	24	100	Renata Saldanha	51.90% (out of 3)	Guilherme Vilar	43.38% (out of 3)	João Pedro Siqueira	4.72% (out of 3)	In this edition, the housemates entered in pairs with their loved ones. During the first part of the game, the pairs acted as if they were a single housemate. In the second phase, they returned to the traditional format.
BBB 26	25	100	Ana Paula Renault	75.94% (out of 3)	Milena Moreira	17.29% (out of 3)	Juliano Floss	6.77% (out of 3)	In this edition, the housemates were divided into three groups: Civilians, Celebrities, and Veterans, who are former housemates of the program, marking the third time that housemates from other editions have returned to the reality show. Also in this edition, the public voted among all the civilians to decide which of them would join the cast.

== Reception ==
=== Brazilian ratings ===
All numbers are provided by IBOPE.

Season	Timeslot (BRT)	Premiered		Ended		TV Season	Viewers (in points)	Rating/ Share
Season	Timeslot (BRT)	Date	Viewers (in points)	Date	Viewers (in points)	TV Season	Viewers (in points)	Rating/ Share
1	Monday and Tuesday, Thursday to Saturday; 10:00PM; Wednesday; 9:30PM; Sunday; 10:50PM	January 29, 2002	49	April 2, 2002	59	2002	40	60%
2	Monday and Tuesday, Thursday to Saturday; 10:00PM; Wednesday; 9:30PM; Sunday; 10:50PM	May 14, 2002	29	July 23, 2002	45	2002	37	59%
3	Monday and Tuesday, Thursday to Saturday; 10:00PM; Wednesday; 9:30PM; Sunday; 10:50PM	January 14, 2003	38	April 1, 2003	55	2003	39	60%
4	Monday and Tuesday, Thursday to Saturday; 10:00PM; Wednesday; 9:30PM; Sunday; 10:50PM	January 13, 2004	42	April 6, 2004	56	2004	45	68%
5	Monday and Tuesday, Thursday to Saturday; 10:00PM; Wednesday; 9:30PM; Sunday; 10:50PM	January 10, 2005	46	March 29, 2005	57	2004–05	47	70%
6	Monday and Tuesday, Thursday to Saturday; 10:00PM; Wednesday; 9:30PM; Sunday; 10:50PM	January 10, 2006	45	March 28, 2006	51	2005–06	43	64%
7	Monday and Tuesday, Thursday to Saturday; 10:00PM; Wednesday; 9:30PM; Sunday; 10:50PM	January 9, 2007	43	April 3, 2007	48	2006–07	41	62%
8	Monday and Tuesday, Thursday to Saturday; 10:00PM; Wednesday; 9:30PM; Sunday; 10:50PM	January 8, 2008	37	March 25, 2008	46	2007–08	37	57%
9	Monday and Tuesday, Thursday to Saturday; 10:00PM; Wednesday; 9:30PM; Sunday; 10:50PM	January 13, 2009	37	April 7, 2009	41	2008–09	32	52%
10	Monday to Saturday; 10:30PM; Sunday; 11:15PM	January 12, 2010	30	March 30, 2010	40	2009–10	31	51%
11	Monday to Saturday; 10:30PM; Sunday; 11:15PM	January 11, 2011	35	March 29, 2011	30	2010–11	25	41%
12	Monday to Saturday; 10:30PM; Sunday; 11:15PM	January 10, 2012	33	March 29, 2012	26	2011–12	27	43%
13	Monday to Saturday; 10:30PM; Sunday; 11:15PM	January 8, 2013	25	March 26, 2013	29	2012–13	25	42%
14	Monday to Saturday; 10:30PM; Sunday; 11:15PM	January 14, 2014	31	April 1, 2014	24	2013–14	22	39%
15	Monday to Saturday; 10:20PM/10:25PM/10:30/10:45PM; Sunday; 11:15PM/11:20PM; Sunday of Carnival; 8:00PM	January 20, 2015	25	April 7, 2015	27	2014–15	23	39%
16	Monday, Tuesday, Thursday to Saturday; 10:20PM/10:25PM; Wednesday; 11:45PM; Sunday; 11:15PM/11:20PM; Sunday of Carnival; 8:00PM	January 19, 2016	24	April 5, 2016	29	2015–16	24	41%
17	Monday, Tuesday, Thursday to Saturday; 10:20PM/10:25PM; Wednesday; 11:45PM; Sunday; 11:15PM/11:20PM; Sunday of Carnival; 8:00PM	January 23, 2017	29	April 13, 2017	29	2016–17	23	40%
18	Monday, Tuesday, Thursday to Saturday; 10:20PM/10:25PM; Wednesday; 11:45PM; Sunday; 11:15PM/11:20PM; Sunday of Carnival; 8:00PM	January 22, 2018	31	April 19, 2018	33	2017–18	26	48%
19	Monday to Saturday; 10:30PM; Wednesday; 11:45PM; Sunday; 11:30PM	January 15, 2019	22	April 12, 2019	25	2018–19	20	39%
20	Monday to Sunday; 10:30PM/10:40PM	January 21, 2020	25	April 27, 2020	34	2019–20	26	48%
21	Monday to Saturday; 10:30PM/10:40PM; Wednesday; 11:30PM; Sunday; 11:15PM	January 25, 2021	27	May 5, 2021	34	2020–21	28	52%
22	Monday to Saturday; 10:30PM; Sunday; 11:15PM	January 17, 2022	28	April 26, 2022	25	2021–22	22	39%
23	Monday to Saturday; 10:30PM; Sunday; 11:30PM	January 16, 2023	23	April 25, 2023	20	2022–23	19	%
24	Monday to Saturday; 10:25PM; Sunday; 11:00PM	January 8, 2024	22	April 16, 2024	27	2023–24	20	40%
25	Monday to Saturday; 10:25PM; Sunday; 11:00PM	January 13, 2025	17	April 22, 2025	17	2024–25	16	33%

- Each point represents 60,000 households in São Paulo.

== Records ==
=== Highest number of rejections to evict ===
#	Season	Week	Voting Results			Ref.
1	21	4	Karol Conká; 99.17% to evict	Arthur Picoli; 0.54% to evict	Gilberto Nogueira; 0.29% to evict	
2	21	3	Nego Di; 98.76% to evict	Fiuk; 0.87% to evict	Sarah Andrade; 0.37% to evict	
3	21	13 (Day 88)	Viih Tube; 96.69% to evict	Fiuk; 2.60% to evict	Gilberto Nogueira; 0.71% to evict	
4	5	8	Aline dos Santos; 95% to evict	Grazielli Massafera; 5% to evict		
5	25	7	Camilla Maia; 94.67% to evict	Renata Saldanha; 2.74% to evict	Vilma Nascimento; 2.59% to evict	
6	18	7	Patrícia Leite; 94.26% to evict	Diego Sabádo; 3.30% to evict	Caruso Junior; 2.44% to evict	
7	26	11 (Day 77)	Solange Couto; 94.17% to evict	Jordana Morais; 3.54% to evict	Marciele Albuquerque; 2.29% to evict	
8	7	4	Felipe Cobra; 93% to evict	Alberto Pimentel; 7% to evict		
9	18	4	Nayara de Deus; 92.69% to evict	Mahmoud Baydoun; 4.03% to evict	Gleici Damasceno; 3.28% to evict	
10	5	4	Rogério Padovan; 92% to evict	Sammy Ueda; 8% to evict		
10	12	7	Rafa Oliveira; 92% to evict	Yuri Fernandes; 8% to evict		

=== Highest number of rejections to save ===
#	Season	Week	Voting Results								Ref.
1	19	1	Vinicius Póvoa; 3.73% to save	Vanderson Brito; 3.84% to save	Tereza Souza; 3.89% to save	Maycon Santos; 5.15% to save	Carolina Peixinho; 5.69% to save	Diego Wantowsky; 6.10% to save	Hariany Almeida; 6.87% to save	Isabella Cecchi; 7.36% to save	
1	19	1	Vinicius Póvoa; 3.73% to save	Alan Possamai; 8.32% to save		Hana Khalil; 8.47% to save	Rízia Cerqueira; 8.66% to save	Gabriela Hebling; 9.20% to save	Rodrigo França; 11.19% to save	Elana Valenária; 11.53% to save	
2	24	3	Lucas Luigi; 7.29% to save	Juninho Silva; 12.14% to save			Alane Dias; 19.55% to save		Isabelle Nogueira; 61.02% to save		
3	24	1 (Day 7)	Lucas Pizane; 8.35% to save	Beatriz Reis; 28.44% to save				Davi Brito; 63.21% to save			
4	24	1 (Day 2)	Maycon Cosmer; 8.46% to save	Giovanna Lima; 42.20% to save				Yasmin Brunet; 49.34% to save			
5	24	2 (Day 14)	Vinícius Rodrigues; 9.92% to save	Lucas Luigi; 12.52% to save		Giovanna Pitel; 15.96% to save		Marcus Vinicius Ferreira; 20.75% to save	Alane Dias; 40.85% to save		
6	23	11	Kassia Marvvila; 16.95% to save	Larissa Santos; 23.04% to save			Domitila Barros; 25.69% to save		Amanda Meirelles; 34.32% to save		
7	24	2 (Day 12)	Nizam Hayek; 17.14% to save	Giovanna Pitel; 37.49% to save				Raquele Cardozo; 45.37% to save			
8	24	1 (Day 5)	Thalyta Alves; 22.71% to save	Juninho Silva; 25.14% to save				Davi Brito; 52.15% to save			

=== Highest number of votes ===
#	Total votes	Season	Voting Results			Ref.
1	1,5 billion	20	Felipe Prior; 56.73% to evict	Manu Gavassi; 42.51% to evict	Mari Gonzalez; 0.76% to evict	
2	751 million	22	Arthur Aguiar; 68.96% to win	Paulo André Camilo; 29.91% to win	Douglas Silva; 1.13% to win	
3	698 million	22	Jade Picon; 84.93% to evict	Jessilane Alves; 13.30% to evict	Arthur Aguiar; 1.77% to evict	
4	654 million	21	Sarah Andrade; 76.76% to evict	Rodolffo Matthaus; 22.00% to evict	Juliette Freire; 1.24% to evict	
5	633 million	21	Juliette Freire; 90.15% to win	Camilla de Lucas; 5.23% to win	Fiuk; 4.62% to win	
6	535 million	21	Carla Diaz; 44.96% to evict	Rodolffo Matthaus; 44.45% to evict	Fiuk; 10.59% to evict	
7	514 million	21	Gilberto Nogueira; 50.87% to evict	Camilla de Lucas; 47.65% to evict	Juliette Freire; 1.48% to evict	
8	416,9 million	21	Rodolffo Matthaus; 50.48% to evict	Caio Afiune; 44.09% to evict	Gilberto Nogueira; 5.43% to evict	
9	416,6 million	20	Guilherme Napolitano; 56.07% to evict	Pyong Lee; 43.29% to evict	Gizelly Bicalho; 0.64% to evict	
10	414 million	21	Arthur Picoli; 61.34% to evict	Camilla de Lucas; 30.77% to evict	Pocah; 7.89% to evict	

=== Highest number of eviction nominations ===
#	Nominated	Season	Housemate	Ref.
1	10 times	20	Babu Santana; Evicted - 4th Place	
2	9 times	24	Alane Dias; Evicted - 4th Place	
3	8 times	24	Davi Brito; Winner - 1st Place	
4	7 times	9	Ana Carolina Madeira; Evicted - 4th Place	
4	7 times	14	Marcelo Zagonel; Evicted - 4th Place	
4	7 times	21	Gilberto Nogueira; Evicted - 4th Place	
4	7 times	23	Domitila Barros; Evicted - 6th Place	
4	7 times	24	Isabelle Nogueira; Finalist - 3rd Place	
4	7 times	25	Vitória Strada; Evicted - 4th Place	

=== Highest percentages to win ===
#	Season	Winner	Ref.
1	12	Fael Cordeiro; 92% (out of 2) to win	
2	7	Diego Gasques; 91% (out of 2) to win	
3	21	Juliette Freire; 90.15% (out of 3) to win	
4	26	Ana Paula Renault; 75.94% (out of 3) to win	
5	4	Cida dos Santos; 69% (out of 2) to win	
6	22	Arthur Aguiar; 68.96% (out of 3) to win	
7	23	Amanda Meirelles; 68.90% (out of 3) to win	
8	1	Kleber Bambam; 68% (out of 3) to win	
9	2	Rodrigo Leonel; 65% (out of 2) to win	
9	15	Cézar Lima; 65% (out of 2) to win	
10	13	Fernanda Keulla; 62.79% (out of 3) to win	

=== Lowest elimination percentages ===
#	Season	Housemate and Percentage	Ref.
1	21	Gilberto Nogueira; 0.29% (out of 3) to evict	
2	21	Sarah Andrade; 0.37% (out of 3) to evict	
3	20	Babu Santana; 0.44% (out of 4) to evict	
4	20	Babu Santana; 0.47% (out of 3) to evict	
4	26	Chaiany Andrade; 0.47% (out of 3) to evict	
5	21	Arthur Picoli; 0.54% (out of 3) to evict	
6	20	Rafa Kalimann; 0.59% (out of 3) to evict	
7	23	Cezar Black; 0.61% (out of 3) to evict	
8	20	Gizelly Bicalho; 0.64% (out of 3) to evict	
9	20	Pyong Lee; 0.66% (out of 4) to evict	
10	26	Chaiany Andrade; 0.68% (out of 3) to evict	

=== Highest percentages to save ===
#	Season	Housemate and Percentage	Ref.
1	24	Davi Brito; 63.21% (out of 3) to save	
2	24	Isabelle Nogueira; 61.02% (out of 4) to save	
3	24	Davi Brito; 52.15% (out of 3) to save	
4	24	Yasmin Brunet; 49.34% (out of 3) to save	
5	24	Raquele Cardozo; 45.37% (out of 3) to save	
6	24	Giovanna Lima; 42.20% (out of 3) to save	
7	24	Alane Dias; 40.85% (out of 5) to save	
8	24	Giovanna Pitel; 37.49% (out of 3) to save	
9	19	Carolina Peixinho; 37.05% (out of 4) to save	
10	23	Amanda Meirelles; 34.32% (out of 4) to save	

== Celebrities ==
Usually Big Brother contestants are already forgotten by the time of the next season, but there are a few exceptions of contestants who became national stars. Juliana Alves, Sabrina Sato, Grazi Massafera, Íris Stefanelli and Juliette Freire are probably the biggest celebrities coming out of the reality show.

Sabrina Sato became a TV personality in Brazil after appearing in the third season. She worked twitch with Playboy magazine and is one of the hosts of Pânico na TV, a very well known TV show among teenagers. Pânico na TV is one of Rede TV's most-watched shows. She was one of Record Network's biggest contracts and is also the spokesperson for several companies. She is one of the judges of The Masked Singer Brasil and makes appearances on TV Globo.

After her participation in the fifth season, where she was recognised as being charismatic, Grazielli Massafera also became a celebrity, appearing in over 130 magazine covers, posing naked for Playboy magazine, starring in over 13 commercials and winning an role on TV Globo's 9 o'clock soap opera Páginas da Vida, for which she was criticised. Grazi is now an actress in Brazil, and also married actor Cauã Reymond. In 2016, she was nominated for the International Emmy Award for Best Actress.

Íris Stefanelli attracted huge attention during her time in the house and achieved extreme popularity, thanks to her charisma. She became a personality in the country after appearing in the seventh season, She received a big paycheck to pose naked for Playboy. Globo decided not to take into consideration "Siri" (as she was nicknamed in the house) huge popularity and decided not to give her a long-term contract. She was contracted by small RedeTV! to co-host celebrities show TV Fama. Her lucrative deal was highlighted by the media. Íris is still a host on the show after the huge buzz that ensued her participation on the house.

Another contestant Jean Wyllys started his career in politics after participating in the program and was elected federal deputy in 2010, 2014 and 2018. Thelma Assis became a tv presenter and model. Juliette Freire became a singer, scoring her first EP on pre-saves on Spotify on Brazil .

Rafa Kalimann was the first participant from the "Camarote" group to reach the top, securing second place in the 20th edition of the reality show. A natural influencer, she rose in her career, becoming one of the biggest in the country and an international reference. She became a presenter, accumulating programs on TV Globo and currently on air with "Circuito Sertanejo". In addition to presenting, she is an actress, with work in the series "Rensga Hits", the soap opera "Família é Tudo" and in two films.

== Game ==
=== My Big Brother ===
A mobile version of Big Brother was released in 2005, called My Big Brother, and reproduced the entire show, in real-time, inside mobile phones. Big Brother Brasil is also on software and is manufactured by Continuum Entertainment and Brasoft Studios.

=== Big Game BBB ===
Big Game BBB appeared in the 22nd season of Big Brother Brasil and brought some news, but, in addition to the program itself, this edition also marked the launch of Big Game BBB, a free virtual game by Globo in which reality fans can guess about the dynamics of the week and see who does better in the bets.

== Controversy and criticism ==
Big Brother Brasil 3 began on January 14, 2003, and was controversial. One of the contestants was the current Miss Brazil, Joseane Oliveira. Rules of the Miss Brazil contest forbid participation of married women but Joseane stated she was single. As a consequence of the exposure during the reality show, some magazines discovered she was married even before winning the beauty contest.

Once the marriage was proven, Joseane was stripped of her crown, and Thaisa Tomsem was crowned Miss Brazil 2002. Also, contestant Dilson Walkarez was not aware of Joseane relationship's status and tried to start a romantic relationship with her during the show. Due to her refusals, he felt unmotivated and left the show voluntarily. Housemate Harry Grossman replaced him at February 26 and became the first housemate not to enter the show on its first day.

During Big Brother Brasil 8, the contestant Juliana Goes fainted during an endurance task where the contestants had to remain perfectly still inside a glass chamber. Newspapers and websites accused the show of being inhumane. However, the show was unaffected by the negative press.

In Big Brother Brasil 10, Marcelo Dourado, a returning contestant from BBB4, was accused of being homophobic but that was ignored and he eventually won his second season.

But the biggest scandal of the show happened on Big Brother Brasil 12 when contestant Daniel Echaniz was accused of raping one of the contestants. He was expelled during the first week and denied the accusations, which were eventually dropped.

In Big Brother Brasil 19, only a few days after the beginning of the show, contestant Vanderson Brito faced rape accusations published online by his former girlfriend. He was expelled after police subpoenaed him for an interview, violating the house rule of having no contact with the outside world. Contestant Hariany Almeida was also expelled, after a party night where she was drunk lead to her pushing another contestant, violating the house rule of no violence. The show also faced considerable criticism as the house divided into two groups, separated by class and race, which lead to considerable racist comments and even police investigations regarding religious intolerance.

In Big Brother Brasil 21, the contestant Karol Conká behavior and actions towards other housemates garnered a very negative reception from the viewers and public personalities. This included Karol's encouragement of outcasting certain housemates, aggressive comments that sparked discussions regarding psychological abuse and prejudiced comments that ranged from gaslighting, xenophobia, religious intolerance and sexual harassment, resulting in her cancellation with loss of followers on social networks and being evicted with the highest rejection of all the seasons, with 99.17% of the votes.

In 2011, Brazilian sociologist Silvia Viana Rodrigues wrote a thesis at University of São Paulo analyzing reality shows as spectacles that proliferate rituals of suffering. She analyzes such rituals in various cultural products from Hollywood and Brazilian television, with special attention to Big Brother Brasil. When investigating the openly eliminatory and cruel face of the game, Silvia Viana points out that such characteristics are liable to be entertainment with great and crucial public engagement because such processes of elimination, competition, exclusion, the affirmation of the war of all against all, of self-management and personal self-control through socio-emotional skills, entrepreneurship, the banality of evil, the naturalization of torture, the "battle for survival" logic and the incorporation of Nazi language and elements are already part of contemporary social life, especially in the context of work under neoliberalism. The thesis was later published as a book.
