= Grazi Massafera =

Brazilian actress and former model (born 1982)

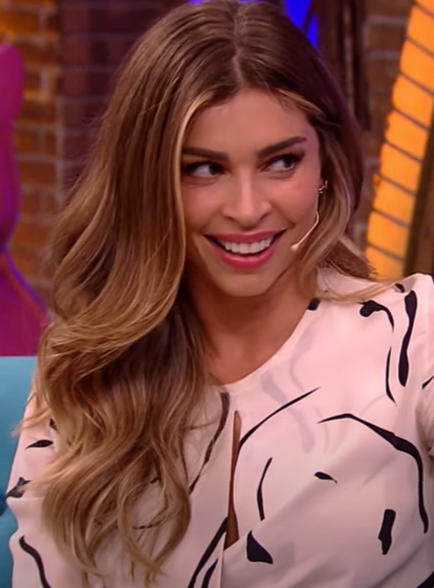
- Massafera in 2018
- Born: Grazielli Soares Massafera; 28 June 1982 (age 44); Jacarezinho, Paraná, Brazil
- Occupation: Actress
- Years active: 2005–present
- Partner(s): Cauã Reymond (2007–2013); Caio Castro (2019–2021)
- Children: 1
- Relatives: Maya Massafera (cousin)

Grazielli "Grazi" Soares Massafera (born 28 June 1982) is a Brazilian actress and former model. Her accolades include an Emmy Award nomination for Best Actress.

In 2004, Massafera won the Miss Paraná pageant, and represented the state in that year's Miss Brasil contest. She finished third, which earned her the title of "Miss Brasil Internacional", and gave her entry into the Miss International 2004 contest, held annually in China. In the international pageant, Massafera did not reach the semi-finals. In 2016, she was nominated for the International Emmy Award for Best Actress for her role in the telenovela Verdades Secretas.

== Early life ==
=== Big Brother ===
In 2005, Massafera took part in the fifth season of the Brazilian version of the reality show Big Brother, known as Big Brother Brasil (BBB). The season was the most-watched season ever. Grazi ended in second, with 40% of the votes.

=== After BBB ===
Grazi became the second Big Brother contestant to become a celebrity (the first one being Sabrina Sato). After the show, she ended up on covers of magazines, had several commercial deals and appeared in events. Commercial deals and magazine cover pictures continued, even after the next Big Brother started.

Right after the show, Grazi signed a 1-year contract with Globo, Brazil's most powerful television channel. To take advantage of her popularity with the audience, she was given a slot as a reporter on Caldeirão do Huck and plans were made for her to become a children's show host on the style of Xuxa.

She also posed nude for Brazilian Playboy in the August 2005 issue. Grazi was one of their highest-paid stars to pose in Playboy. The issue sold twice what a typical edition would sell and was the best-selling cover of 2005.

== Career ==
She started acting classes at Globo acting department. Her first starring role was in a Renato Aragão 2005 movie: Didi, o Caçador de Tesouros.

At the beginning of 2006 it was revealed that Massafera would get a part in Manoel Carlos next soap, which was an important deal since his soaps are usually the most-watched shows in the country. Initially, she only had a small role on the Rede Globo soap opera, Páginas da Vida, which during its airing was the No. 1 show on Brazilian television, achieving record ratings. However, due to her popularity, her part was expanded, and eventually became one of the main characters of the soap. Her acting was acclaimed by the press and the public alike and she became one of the biggest celebrities in the country. For her acting, she received a Prêmio Contigo as best newcomer and a Prêmio de Imprensa as personality of the year.

Her May 2007 cover of Boa Forma magazine was her 134th cover since 2005.

She participated in the parade of one of the most prestigious Samba schools in Rio Carnival in the 2007 carnival. In Easter she played Maria in the theatrical version of "The Passion of Christ". Soon after, Massafera visited Portugal where she was also very popular because of her role in Páginas da Vida and shot commercials.

From 2007 to 2008 Massafera starred in the soap Desejo Proibido. In 2008 she was crowned queen of the Copacabana Palace carnival. In 2008 she was given her first starring main role in a soap, Negócio da China.

== Filmography ==
=== Television ===
Year	Title	Role	Notes
2005	Big Brother Brasil 5	Participant (runner-up)	Season 5
2005	A Turma do Didi	Herself	Special participation
2005	TV Xuxa	Magrizielli	Segment: "Bruxa Keka"
2005	Caldeirão do Huck	Reporter	Special participation
2006	Páginas da Vida	Thelma Ribeiro	Supporting
2007	Casseta & Planeta, Urgente!	Various roles	Segment: "Grazieli e Planeta"
2007	Desejo Proibido	Florinda Palhares	Supporting
2008	Casos e Acasos	Graziela	Episode: "O Presente, a Sociedade e a Tentação"
2008	Negócio da China	Lívia Noronha	Protagonist
2009	Superbonita	Presenter	Special participation
2010	Tempos Modernos	Deodora Madureira Niemann / N. Anne	Antagonist
2010	As Cariocas	Michelle	Episode: "A Desinibida do Grajaú"
2011	Passione	Herself	Special participation
2011	Aquele Beijo	Lucena Zambelli	Supporting
2013	Flor do Caribe	Ester Schneider Albuquerque	Protagonist
2014	Superbonita	Presenter	Season 15
2014	A Grande Família	Rose Happy Hour	Episode: "April 24, 2014"
2014	Geração Brasil	Jéssica Malta	Special participation
2015	Verdades Secretas	Larissa Ramos	Supporting
2015	Mister Brau	Herself	Special participation
2016	A Lei do Amor	Luciane Almeida de Sousa Leitão	Supporting
2017	O Outro Lado do Paraíso	Lívia Monserrat de Aguiar	Supporting
2019	Bom Sucesso	Paloma da Silva	Protagonist
2022	Travessia	Débora Bittencourt / Bianca Rossi	Episode: "October 10th" + flashbacks
2025	BBB: O Documentário	Herself	Documentary
2025	Três Graças	Arminda Melo Dantas	Antagonist
2026	Dona Beja	Ana Jacinta "Dona Beja" de São José	Protagonist

=== Film ===
Year	Title	Role	Notes
2006	Didi, o Caçador de Tesouros	Ana	
2007	Shark Bait	Cordelia (voice)	Brazilian dubbing
2012	Billi Pig	Marivalda Montenegro Duarte	
2012	Billi Pig	Billi Pig (voice)	
2016	Entre Idas e Vindas	Woman on the phone (voice)	
2016	Entre Homens de Bem	Herself	
2024	Uma Família Feliz	Eva Carvalho	
2026	Corridas dos Bichos	TBA	

=== Music Videos ===
Year	Title	Artist
2021	"Retrovisor"	Fábio de Melo and Ivete Sangalo
2024	"Antes Que o Mundo Acabe"	Tiago Iorc

=== Stage ===
Year	Title	Role	Notes
2007	Paixão de Cristo de Nova Jerusalém	Mary Magdalene	

== Awards and nominations ==
Year	Organisation	Category	Work	Result
2007	Melhores do Ano	Best Female Revelation	Páginas da Vida	Won
2007	Prêmio Contigo! de TV	Best Female Revelation	Páginas da Vida	Won
2007	Prêmio Qualidade Brasil	Best Female Revelation	Páginas da Vida	Won
2007	Troféu Imprensa	Revelation of Year	Páginas da Vida	Won
2007	Troféu Internet	Revelation of Year	Páginas da Vida	Won
2008	Prêmio Contigo! de TV	Best Supporting Actress	Desejo Proibido	Nominated
2009	Prêmio Extra de Televisão	Best Supporting Actress	Desejo Proibido	Nominated
2009	Prêmio Extra de Televisão	Best Actress	Negócio da China	Nominated
2009	Prêmio Contigo! de TV	Best Actress	Negócio da China	Nominated
2012	Prêmio Contigo! de Cinema	Best Actress	Billi Pig	Won
2012	Prêmio Quem	Best Actress	Billi Pig	Won
2013	Troféu Internet	Best Actress	Flor do Caribe	Nominated
2015	Prêmio Extra de Televisão	Best Supporting Actress	Verdades Secretas	Won
2015	Troféu APCA	Best Actress	Verdades Secretas	Won
2015	Melhores do Ano	Best Supporting Actress	Verdades Secretas	Won
2015	Prêmio Quem	Best Actress of TV	Verdades Secretas	Nominated
2016	Troféu Imprensa	Best Actress	Verdades Secretas	Won
2016	Troféu Internet	Best Actress	Verdades Secretas	Won
2016	International Emmy	Best Actress	Verdades Secretas	Nominated
2017	Prêmio Quem de Televisão	Best Supporting Actress	A Lei do Amor	Won
2017	Troféu Internet	Best Actress	A Lei do Amor	Won
2017	Troféu Imprensa	Best Actress	A Lei do Amor	Nominated
2017	Prêmio Extra de Televisão	Best Supporting Actress	A Lei do Amor	Nominated
