= Juliana Alves =

Brazilian actress and model

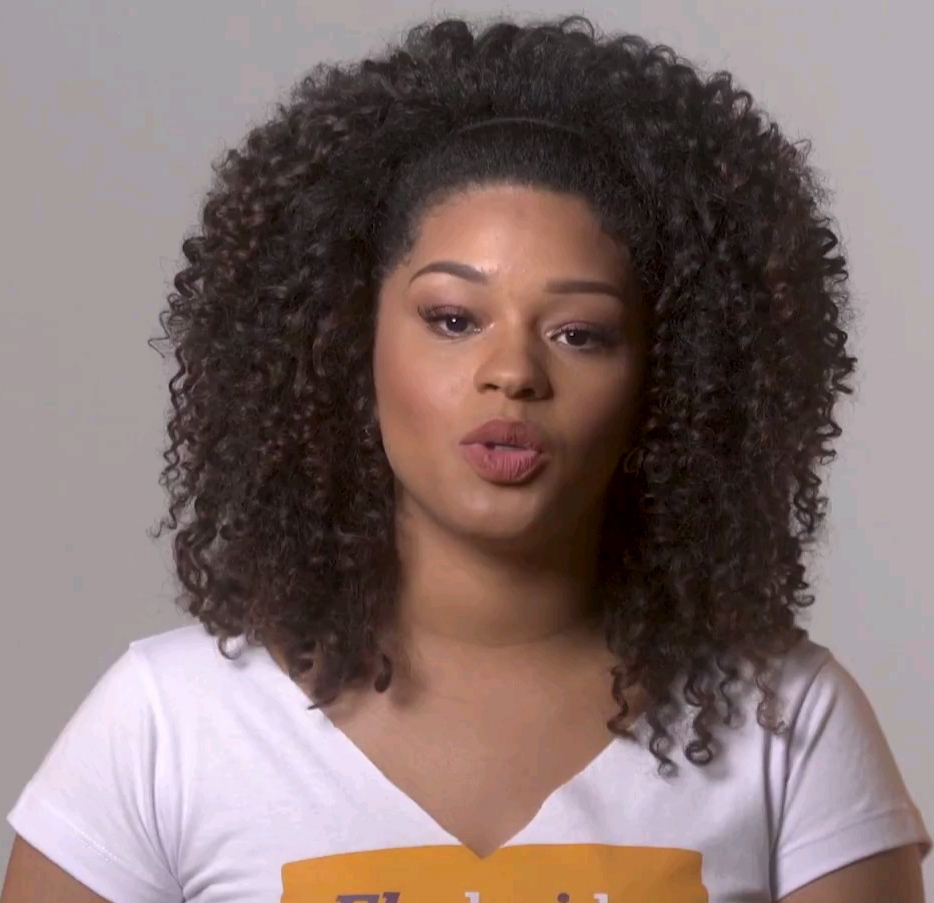
- Alves in 2018
- Born: Juliana Alves de Oliveira; 3 May 1982 (age 44); Rio de Janeiro, Brazil
- Occupation: Actress
- Spouse: Ernani Nunes (m. 2017; div. 2022)
- Children: 1
- Website: www.julianaalves.com.br

Juliana Alves de Oliveira (born 3 May 1982) is a Brazilian actress, known to participate in the reality show Big Brother Brasil 3 in 2003. Alves won a spot in the program almost by accident: during a concert singer Luiz Melodia, she was approached by a producer of TV Globo, who invited her for an interview. This last step, Alves participated in various tests, to be chosen.

== Biography ==
=== Early life, career and Big Brother Brasil ===
"There was prejudice [against the Big Brother Brasil]. Thought that people participate only to appear and did not believe in the possibility of earning money. But I changed my mind when I thought that thousands of people have wanted to live this experience and that it had appeared in my life unexpectedly"

— Alves after the unexpected invitation to participate in the reality.

Alves was born in Rio de Janeiro on May 3, 1982, daughter of teacher Fátima Machado and psychologist Sebastião Oliveira. From the beginning literacy by the third year of high school she studied at the Colégio Pedro II. At 18, she was a volunteer and one of the health workers project Gymkhana-Aids information ONG Criola, who fights against prejudice to black women. She graduated in Escola de Serviço Social da Universidade Federal do Rio de Janeiro. She studied dance, and her teacher nominated her to a famous choreographer, then starting as a dancer in Domingão do Faustão, doing amateur theater and advertising campaigns.

In 2002, Ahmed was approached by producers of reality show Big Brother Brasil after several tests and was confirmed in the third edition of the program. While in reality remained, she received immunity in the second week, was the third angel and group leader on Wednesday, winning a car as a gift for winning proof. Was eliminated in the sixth week after facing Dhomini Ferreira in the wall, and he later edition of the winner. After the actress out of Big Brother Brasil, she was invited to the novel Chocolate com Pimenta, where he played "the young fighter" Selma. With the end of the telenovela, was off work and joined in Psychology at the Rio de Janeiro State University with the quota system for blacks.

=== New jobs and notoriety ===
In 2005, participated in the series Mano a Mano of Rede TV as Rosy, participated in the play "Como o Diabo Gosta" and the same year made a cameo as Sheila in Prova de Amor of Rede Record. Two years later, Alves received a proposal from Rede Record to make a big role in a new novel, and at the same time, Globo invited her to act in the miniseries Amazônia, de Galvez a Chico Mendes in a minor role, finally accepting the proposal from Globo after receiving advice people she loved and trusted. In it, she played Áurea. After Amazônia, the actress auditioned for the six novel, but has not been hired by Rio broadcaster. In the same year embarked on Duas Caras, as "coquettish periguete" Gislaine Caó dos Santos. Because of its performance in the novel, won the Contigo! actress of revelation.

In 2008 made several contributions and program in Portuguese Episódio Especial, and Brazilian Casos e Acasos, Faça Sua História and A Grande Família. A year later, he played Suellen, a waitress who works in a pastry shop of an Indian family and used to attend a gaff in Lapa India – A Love Story. For his efforts, he won the best actress award at the Black Race Trophy 2009. In October 2009, made the cover of Playboy magazine and the end of the year, appeared on A Turma do Didi and Chico e Amigos.

=== Ti Ti Ti, other novels and cinema ===
Alves, in 2010, lived a villain and social climber Clotilde Matoso in Ti Ti Ti, and in the same year supported the government project "Levanta a Cabeça - Qual é a sua história?", Which aimed to enhance the black consciousness through activities in schools impact of state schools. In 2011, he acted in movies like Betina in the film Vamos Fazer um Brinde, which received no fee for making and has renewed its contract with Rede Globo for four years at the end of the year.

In 2012, gave life to villain and cook Dinha in Cheias de Charme, starred in an episode of audiovisual As Brasileiras, in the episode "A Mascarada do ABC" as the cabbie Janice. Made a contribution in the first season of Louco por Elas by Marina and as they appeared in the film for the second time in the film E Aí... Comeu? giving life to "smart" Isabela.

== Filmography ==
=== TV ===
Television
Year	Title	Role	Notes
2003	Big Brother Brasil 3	Herself (participant)	6th eliminated
2003	Chocolate com Pimenta	Selma Cardoso de Almeida	
2005	Mano a Mano	Rosy	
2005	Prova de Amor	Sheila	Cameo
2007	Amazônia, de Galvez a Chico Mendes	Áurea	
2007	Duas Caras	Gislaine Caó dos Santos	
2008	Casos e Acasos	Joelma	15º Episode: "A Nova Namorada, o Chefe e o Dia Fértil"
2008	Faça Sua História	Domingas	21º Episode: "O Estouro da Boiada"
2008	A Grande Família	Josiane (Women Jerimum)	Episode: "Babá Jerimum"
2009	Caminho das Índias	Suellen	
2009	A Turma do Didi	Inês	(Appears in Video Martinho da Vila)
2009	Chico e Amigos	Brenda	Special End of Year
2010	Ti Ti Ti	Clotilde Matoso	
2012	As Brasileiras	Janice	Episode: "A Mascarada do ABC"
2012	Louco por Elas	Mariana	Cameo
2012	Cheias de Charme	Dinha	
2015	Babilônia	Valeska de Paiva	
2017	Sol Nascente	Dora	
2020	Salve-se Quem Puder	Renata "Renatinha" Modesto	
2023	Amor Perfeito	Wanda Pacheco	
2024	Volta por Cima	Aparecida "Cida"	
2025	BBB: O Documentário	Herself	
2025	Três Graças	Alaíde Ramos Gonzaga	

=== Cinema ===
Film
Year	Title	Role
2011	Vamos Fazer um Brinde	Betina
2012	E Aí... Comeu?	Isabela
2014	Made in China	Andressa

=== Theater ===
Parts
Year	Title	Role
2005	Como o Diabo Gosta	Jandira

== Personal life and carnival ==
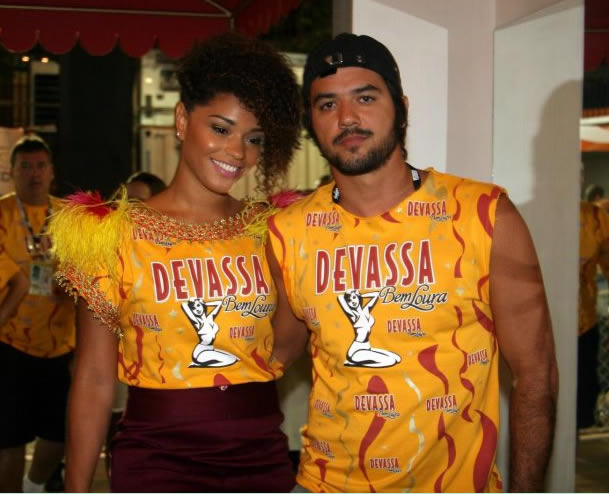
Alves and Guilherme Duarte Carnival in 2011.

Alves met Guilherme Duarte, her current boyfriend, during the filming of the novel Duas Caras in 2007. He was surrounded by several girls and a mutual friend of the couple encouraged the two together, but the actress did not want to relate so early, but later they officiated dating. They interpreted a romantic couple in the plot and had the first meeting after the end of this. in 2010, they thought about getting married and lived together for a while, called "test" for them, but both returned to live alone then.

We did a test, he came to live at my house. But we talked and we did not live together legally and then celebrate the union. So we will organize a ceremony to do, need not be traditional [...] I think the wedding very important and I think when you house gives a certain maturity in the relationship and it is important to celebrate with family and friends. But for now we do not panejou nothing. We are so very well, I think marriage has to have a certain purpose. I really think I'll just marry when painting the desire to have a child.

— Alves giving his opinion about marriage.

Critics say that Alves has "soul of a dancer." She was the muse Salgueiro and queen Battery Império da Tijuca in 2004. Representing the Mocidade Independente de Padre Miguel, Renascer de Jacarepaguá, Vila Isabel e Pérola Negra at the Carnival of São Paulo.

In 2013 she was crowned as Queen of the Unidos da Tijuca battery at dawn on November 25, 2013, the court trials of school, and was thrilled: "I thought it was be better prepared as they have been months of waiting. But when I stepped on the court I felt a lot of emotion, because today I'm meeting people who are part of my life, my family and my true friends, who are by my side at all times of my life.'m with my people, the week of black consciousness, is the best time of my life. define not even know what I'm feeling so excited. [...] when I see the smile of a component of the school saying that I played well all worth it". Alves paraded twice in Tijuca when little bayed.

== Activism against racism ==
"Criola is my home and my school [...] I learned to have organization, to live with a group and deal with people. Sensation of being useful is wonderful."

— Alves, age 18, describing the feeling of participating ONG Criola.

After being one of the agents and voluntary health project Gymkhana-AIDS information from ONG Criola fighting against prejudice to black women when she was 18, supported in 2011 the government project "Levanta a Cabeça - Qual é a sua história?", which aimed to enhance the black consciousness through activities in schools impact of state schools: "A few months ago my niece came home wondering why she was that color, why was her hair that way. Never heard of a white child who questioned their origin. School is largely responsible for the socialization of individuals [... ] I am very hopeful for the initiatives that are being taken, we have a law requiring the teaching of history and culture african in elementary schools and high schools. Since children absorb values that reproduce through learning, no one is born a racist."

Alves said that they suffered racism early in his career, and today handles it as an obstacle and not as "things of this world in which we live." It will please the quota system for black and brown Brazilian colleges, claiming: "With regard to equal opportunities are still very backward. Even fulfill pre-established quotas. That means we still need to fix this social injustice." The actress ranks Brazil as a country that hides the prejudice in general:

The proof that we are far behind on this issue and that racism exists in Brazil is precisely this whole discussion still exists. Today, more than 15 years ago, people are embarrassed and feel out of common sense when viewing intolerant. We see fewer people extolling and filling her mouth to be intolerant, because today racism is a crime, because society is more flexible toward homosexuals. Example is that when [the congressman] Jair Bolsonaro was speaking what he thinks, he received an answer to the height of public opinion. I think now it is very clear that it is not cool to be intolerant, but otherwise I think people still have not resolved this internally. Brazil is still a country that candle and hides under the rug all these issues.
