= Jean Wyllys =

Brazilian politician

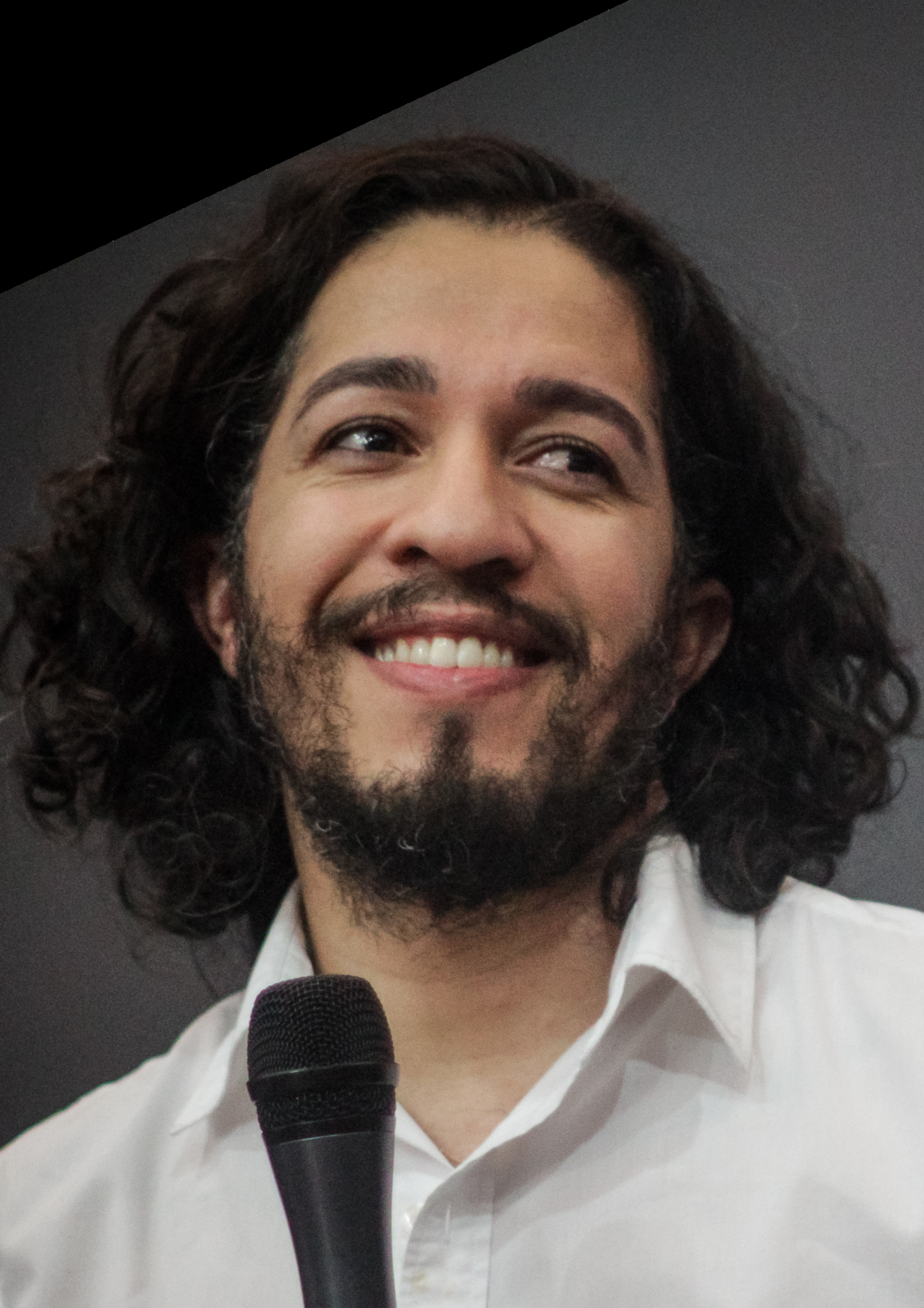
- Wyllys in 2015

Federal Deputy for Rio de Janeiro
- In office 1 February 2011 – 31 January 2019
- Succeeded by: David Miranda

Personal details
- Born: Jean Wyllys de Matos Santos; 10 March 1974 (age 52) Alagoinhas, Bahia, Brazil
- Party: PT (2021–present)
- Other political affiliations: PSOL (2009–21)
- Website: www.jeanwyllys.com.br

Jean Wyllys de Matos Santos (Brazilian Portuguese: [ʒeˈɐ̃ ˈwiliz dʒi ˈmatus ˈsɐ̃tus]; born 10 March 1974) is a Brazilian lecturer, journalist and politician who rose to fame after winning the fifth season of Big Brother Brasil. He was also notable as being Brazil's second openly gay member of parliament and the first congressman to be a gay-rights activist. (Note: Clodovil Hernandes was the first openly gay elected member of Parliament, but unlike Wyllys, Clodovil was not a gay rights activist, i.e. he was opposed to same-sex marriage.) He has been compared to Harvey Milk for his work. In 2019, citing death threats, he resigned from his seat in Congress.

== Life ==
Wyllys was born in Alagoinhas, in the northeastern state of Bahia, one of seven children. His mother was a washerwoman and his father a car painter who suffered from alcoholism. Wyllys attended a boarding school, which gave him the opportunity to get a better education than the average child in his village. Wyllys later moved to Salvador and obtained his bachelor's degree in journalism at the Federal University of Bahia. He first rose to fame after becoming the finalist in the Brazilian reality television show, Big Brother Brasil in its fifth season in 2005. He was the first openly gay participant in the show, which caused controversy amongst fans and participants alike. Wyllys described his victory as being of "great political relevance [...] I said I was a homosexual and I still won the TV show in a country that is homophobic."

=== Political career ===
In 2010 Wyllys was elected a federal member of the Brazilian Congress, representing the Socialism and Freedom party, with an average of 13,000 votes. His election was only possible, considering the number of votes he had in 2010 elections, through the so-called "voto de legenda" (party vote), a constitutional mechanism that allows candidates who do not have a large number of votes to be elected through votes of another highly voted candidate of the same party. In Wyllys's case, the votes of another congressman of Socialism and Liberty Party, Chico Alencar, who was one of the most voted in Rio de Janeiro, helped in his election. Upon occupying a seat in Congress, Wyllys brought his LGBT movement activism to the scene. He started working on his political platform, which was primarily focused on the fight for LGBT rights. In so doing, he ended up confronting prominent Brazilian right-wing figures, such as pastor Silas Malafaia, a famous televangelist and national president of the Assembly of God Churches, and Jair Bolsonaro, a congressman (later elected president) who became Wyllys's nemesis in the Brazilian Congress. Wyllys at one point spat at congressman Bolsonaro during the voting of President Dilma Rousseff's impeachment. In Congress, he proposed three controversial pieces of legislation, including the regulation of prostitution, the legalization and government regulation of marijuana production, and the government financing of sex reassignment surgeries and hormonal treatment for transgender teenagers and adults.

Wyllys' defense of minority rights and his existence as an openly gay Congress member and human rights activist have made him a public enemy of conservative political forces in Brazil. Living in a country with such a high rate of homophobic crimes as Brazil, Wyllys began to receive death threats. These became more recurrent after his political enemies began a campaign against him by posting and sharing in social media, including Facebook, images with quotes attributed to him, portraying him as being openly a paedophile. Among other remarks falsely attributed to him was one which stated that the Bible was "a joke" and that Christians and Bible followers were "clowns." This was widely circulated. Nevertheless, people in social networks still shared them, strengthening the ongoing hate campaign against Wyllys. To repair his image damaged by the orchestrated campaign, he created a section on his official webpage where he refutes all the quotes attributed to him. Although his political image in the public sphere had been tarnished by the slanderous campaign, Wyllys ran for congress once again in 2014 and kept his seat in parliament with more than 100,000 votes, receiving the seventh most votes among representatives from Rio de Janeiro.

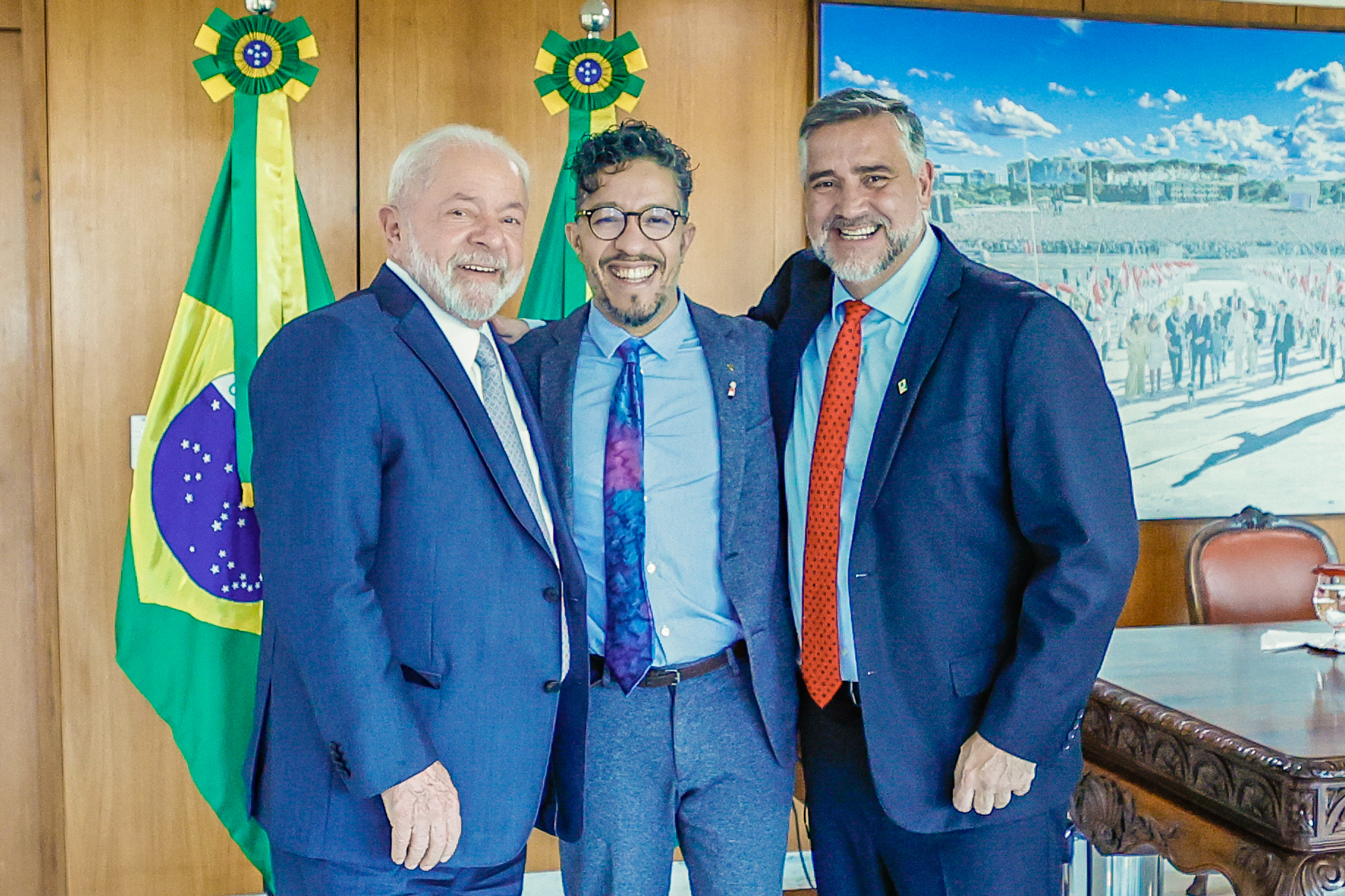
President Luiz Inácio Lula da Silva (left), Wyllys (middle), and Paulo Pimenta (right) at the Palácio do Planalto, 2023.

In 2015, it was announced that Brazilian independent filmmakers were planning to produce a documentary about Wyllys's political career and activism. The documentary was released in 2016 with the title "Entre os Homens de Bem" (Among Virtuous Men). The documentary focuses on the political arena in Brazil and addresses topics such as gay marriage and LGBT rights, and features Wyllys and his conservative opponents.

==== Resignation ====
Wyllys was re-elected to a third term as a member of Congress in the 2018 election. However, the campaign took a toll on him. His close friend, Rio de Janeiro city councillor Marielle Franco, was fatally shot in March 2018. In January 2019, just days before the February 1 swearing-in of the 56th Congress, Wyllys released a note from overseas stating that he would not return to Brazil due to alleged death threats and that he would not assume his position as congressman. He told the Folha de São Paulo newspaper that he did not want to live four years under close security watch. He was replaced in the Chamber of Deputies by David Miranda. Soon after news of Wyllys' resignation broke, President Bolsonaro reacted on Twitter, by posting the phrase "Great day" followed by a "thumbs-up" emoji. His son, Carlos Bolsonaro, also tweeted: "Godspeed and be happy".

=== Life after Congress ===
As of 2022, Wyllys is performing doctoral research on “fake news” at the University of Barcelona. He returned to Brazil for the first time in July 2023. In May 2024, he called for Lula to not run for a fourth term in 2026, instead endorsing Simone Tebet as a potential successor.
