= Maya Massafera =

Brazilian fashion producer, television presenter and YouTuber

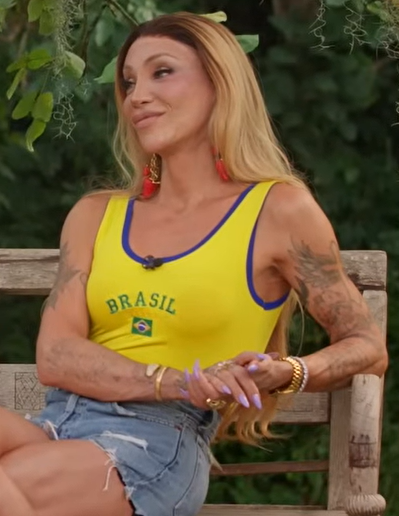
- Massafera in 2026
- Born: 18 September 1980 (age 46); Pouso Alegre, Minas Gerais, Brazil
- Occupations: Fashion producer, television presenter, and YouTuber
- Relatives: Grazi Massafera (cousin)

Maya Mazzafera e Silva, better known as Maya Massafera (born Matheus Mazzafera; Pouso Alegre, 18 September 1980), is a Brazilian fashion producer, television presenter, and YouTuber.

== Biography ==
Maya was born and raised in the municipality of Pouso Alegre, in Minas Gerais. She is the daughter of business owners in the road transport sector.

In 2002, after graduating in fashion in Italy, she became a fashion producer, working for magazines such as Vogue, Marie Claire, and Stylist, as well as editorials for major brands both in Brazil and internationally, creating looks for models in Bolivia, Nigeria, Burundi, and Venezuela. During this time, Massafera worked with celebrities such as Gisele Bündchen, Maria da Gloria Fontes, Ana Hickmann, Alessandra Ambrósio, Izabel Goulart and Ana Beatriz Barros.

In 2011, she became a reporter for the segment "Na Moita" on the program Superpop, on Rede TV!. In 2012, she signed a contract with RecordTV and was part of the judging panel for Top Model, o Reality, hosted by Ana Hickmann and Ticiane Pinheiro. At the same time, he became a reporter for Programa da Tarde.

In 2013, she signed with Rede Bandeirantes to join the team of the program Claquete, presented by Otávio Mesquita, but which ended that year. In 2015, she starred for the first time in her own program, Chega Mais, on RedeTV!, alongside Renata Kuerten, where they conducted interviews with celebrities. In 2016, she launched her own YouTube channel, Hottel Mazzafera. In 2018, Massafera became a reporter for Vídeo Show, on TV Globo, alongside comedians Carioca and Maurício Meirelles. In 2020, she began presenting the reality show De Férias Com o Ex, on MTV.

== Personal life ==
She is a cousin of the actress Grazi Massafera.

In 2012, she came out as a gay man to Quem magazine.

In April 2024, it was announced that she had begun the gender transition process and had already undergone feminization surgeries, such as breast implants and voice enhancements. In May, she shared her new birth certificate, with the name Maya and female gender. That month, she made her first social media post after her gender transition.
