= Big Brother Brasil 15 =

- Season 15
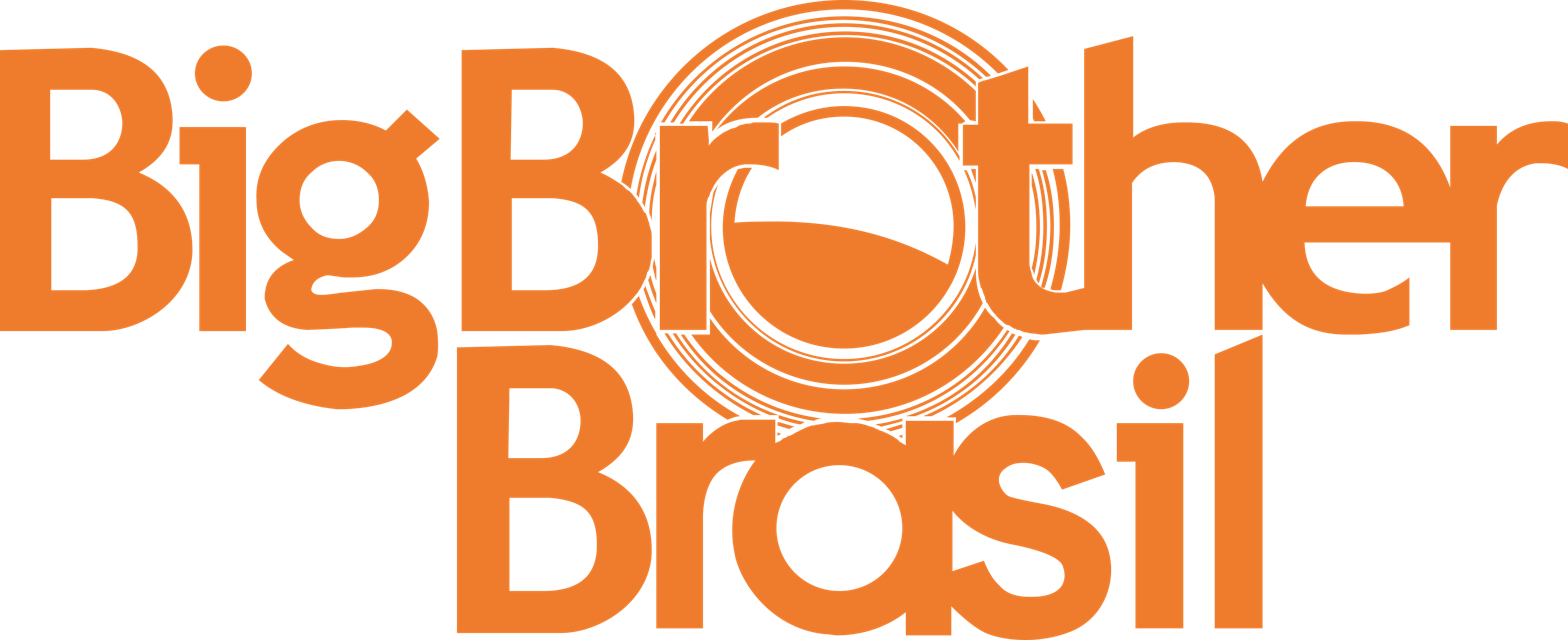
- No. of days: 78
- No. of housemates: 15
- Winner: Cézar Martins
- Runner-up: Amanda Djehdian
- No. of episodes: 78

Release
- Original network: Globo
- Original release: January 20 – April 7, 2015

Season chronology
- ← Previous; Big Brother Brasil 14 Next → Big Brother Brasil 16

Big Brother Brasil 15 was the fifteenth season of Big Brother Brasil which premiered January 20, 2015, on the Rede Globo television network.

The show is produced by Endemol Globo and presented by news reporter Pedro Bial. The season is officially confirmed since March 2012 as part of a millionaire contract between international Endemol and Rede Globo, which guaranteed the show's rights until 2016.

The grand prize is R$1.5 million with tax allowances, with a R$150,000 prize offered to the runner up and a R$50,000 prize offered to the 3rd place. Cézar Lima won this season on Day 78.

== The game ==
=== Rules changes ===
This season, the Head of Household back to be eligible to compete in the next HoH competition after his leadership, having the chance to be HoH multiple times in a row. Also, he/she gains R$10.000, the Power of No and the right to divide the housemates into two teams for the Food competition. However, for the first time since BBB started, the HoH has no immunity in the nominations, becoming vulnerable to being nominated by the house vote.

=== You're in control! ===
Big Brother introduced a new way to give more power to the audience, calling it Você no Controle. Every week, producers pose a question and the public must vote between two options. The voting usually is opened on Friday and finishes on Sunday.

Week	Question	Options	Vote	Brazil's choice
2	The Have-Nots should have the right to choose a housemate among themselves to win an extra immunity?	Yes	63%	Yes
2	The Have-Nots should have the right to choose a housemate among themselves to win an extra immunity?	No	37%	Yes
3	The HoH Amanda should have the right to veto the POI's choice?	Yes	50.44%	Yes
3	The HoH Amanda should have the right to veto the POI's choice?	No	49.56%	Yes
4	The housemates should nominate face to face in the next nominations?	Yes	87%	Yes
4	The housemates should nominate face to face in the next nominations?	No	13%	Yes
5	The housemate who answers the first Big Phone must:	Be nominated	62%	Be nominated
5	The housemate who answers the first Big Phone must:	Nominate	38%	Be nominated
6	The winner of the PoI should be immune?	Yes	71%	Yes
6	The winner of the PoI should be immune?	No	29%	Yes
7	Should the housemates vote before the HoH?	Yes	72%	Yes
7	Should the housemates vote before the HoH?	No	28%	Yes
8	Should the vote of the POI winner be vetoed or count as double?	Vetoed	26%	Double
8	Should the vote of the POI winner be vetoed or count as double?	Double	74%	Double
9	Should the HoH vote before the PoI winner gives its immunity?	Yes	36%	No
9	Should the HoH vote before the PoI winner gives its immunity?	No	64%	No
10	The winner of the HoH should be immune?	Yes	49%	No
10	The winner of the HoH should be immune?	No	51%	No

=== Power of No ===
Week	Power of No	Total vetoed	Vetoed housemates
2	Mariza	1	Luan
3	Rafael	2	Marco, Mariza
4	Amanda	2	Aline, Fernando
5	Luan	0	–
6	Fernando	1	Luan
7	Adrilles	2	Luan, Cézar
8	Amanda	1	Mariza

=== Big Phone ===
Week	Date	Timeslot (BRT)	Housemate	Consequences
5	February 22, 2015	Sunday; 11:15PM	Luan	See; Note 7
10	March 26, 2015	Thursday; 11:15PM	Fernando	See; Note 11

== Housemates ==
The cast list with the first 13 housemates was unveiled on January 13, 2015. On day 2, two potential competitors (Aline and Julia) entered the house in order to compete by public vote for the 14th housemate's spot.

(ages stated at time of contest)

Name	Age	Occupation	Hometown	Day entered	Day exited	Result
Cézar Lima	30	Law student	Guarapuava	1	78	Winner
Amanda Djehdian	28	Businesswoman/YouTuber	São Paulo	1	78	Runner-up
Fernando Medeiros	32	Cultural producer	Rio de Janeiro	1	76	11th Evicted
Adrilles Jorge	40	Writer	Belo Horizonte	1	71	10th Evicted
Mariza Moreira	51	Art teacher	Recife	1	64	9th Evicted
Rafael Licks	21	Management student	Canela	1	57	8th Evicted
Luan Patricio	23	Manager	Mesquita	1	50	7th Evicted
Tamires Peloso	24	Dentist	São Paulo	1	48	Walked
Talita Araújo	22	Flight attendant	Goiânia	1	43	6th Evicted
Angélica Ramos	33	Nursing assistant	Embu das Artes	1	36	5th Evicted
Aline Gotschalg	24	Fashion student	Belo Horizonte	2	29	4th Evicted
Marco Marcon	35	Theologian	Curitiba	1	22	3rd Evicted
Douglas Ferreira	29	Motoboy	São Paulo	1	15	2nd Evicted
Francieli Medeiros	36	Criminal conciliator	Porto Alegre	1	8	1st Evicted

== Future Appearances ==
In 2021, Angélica Ramos appeared in No Limite 5, she finished the competition in 15th place.

== Voting history ==
	Week 1		Week 2	Week 3	Week 4	Week 5	Week 6	Week 7	Week 8	Week 9	Week 10	Week 11	
	Day 2	Day 6	Week 2	Week 3	Week 4	Week 5	Week 6	Week 7	Week 8	Week 9	Week 10	Day 75	Finale
Head of Household	(none)	Mariza	Rafael	Amanda	Luan	Fernando	Adrilles	Amanda	Fernando	Amanda	Amanda	(none)	
Power of Immunity	(none)	Marco	Angélica	Talita	Tamires	Tamires	Tamires	Luan	Adrilles	Mariza	(none)	(none)	
Saved	(none)	Adrilles	Amanda	Rafael	Adrilles	Talita	Tamires	Rafael	Mariza	Adrilles	(none)	(none)	
Nomination (Twist)	(none)	(none)				Luan	(none)				(none)	(none)	
Nomination (HoH)	(none)	Douglas	Douglas	Fernando	Aline	Angélica	Luan	Luan	Cézar	Mariza	Adrilles	Amanda; Fernando	(none)
Nomination (Housemates)	(none)	Francieli	Adrilles	Marco	Amanda; Mariza	Mariza	Cézar; Talita	Cézar	Rafael	Cézar	Cézar	Amanda; Fernando	(none)
Cézar	Not eligible	Marco	Aline	Aline	Angélica	Amanda	Adrilles	Fernando	Fernando	Amanda	Fernando	Exempt	Winner (Day 78)
Amanda	Not eligible	Luan	Adrilles	Marco	Mariza	Mariza	Cézar	Cézar	Adrilles	Head of Household	Head of Household	Nominated	Runner-Up (Day 78)
Fernando	Not eligible	Francieli	Angélica	Luan	Amanda	Head of Household	Cézar	Luan	Head of Household	Cézar	Cézar	Nominated	Evicted (Day 76)
Adrilles	Not eligible	Francieli	Angélica	Luan	Amanda	Rafael	Talita	Cézar	Rafael ^{x2}	Cézar	Cézar	Evicted (Day 71)	
Mariza	Not eligible	Head of Household	Tamires	Luan	Amanda	Rafael	Talita	Luan	Rafael	Fernando	Evicted (Day 64)		
Rafael	Not eligible	Francieli	Adrilles	Marco	Mariza	Cézar	Cézar	Adrilles	Adrilles	Evicted (Day 57)			
Luan	Not eligible	Marco	Adrilles	Marco	Head of Household	Mariza	Fernando	Cézar	Evicted (Day 50)				
Tamires	Not eligible	Talita	Adrilles	Marco	Mariza	Mariza	Cézar	Walked (Day 48)					
Talita	Not eligible	Francieli	Adrilles	Marco	Mariza	Mariza	Mariza	Evicted (Day 43)					
Angélica	Not eligible	Luan	Cézar	Marco	Mariza	Cézar	Evicted (Day 36)						
Aline	Nominated	Francieli	Angélica	Luan	Amanda	Evicted (Day 29)							
Marco	Not eligible	Francieli	Angélica	Luan	Evicted (Day 22)								
Douglas	Not eligible	Mariza	Rafael	Evicted (Day 15)									
Francieli	Not eligible	Luan	Evicted (Day 8)										
Julia	Nominated	Evicted (Day 6)											
Notes	1		2, 3	4	5, 6	7	6, 8	9	10	(none)		11	12
Nominated for Eviction	Aline; Julia	Douglas; Francieli	Adrilles; Douglas	Fernando; Marco	Aline; Amanda; Mariza	Angélica; Luan; Mariza	Cézar; Luan; Talita	Cézar; Luan	Cézar; Rafael	Cézar; Mariza	Adrilles; Cézar	Amanda; Fernando	Amanda; Cézar
Walked	(none)							Tamires	(none)				
Evicted	Julia; 47% to save	Francieli; 58% to evict	Douglas; 63% to evict	Marco; 52% to evict	Aline; 53% to evict	Angélica; 69% to evict	Talita; 60% to evict	Luan; 87% to evict	Rafael; 77% to evict	Mariza; 50.22% to evict	Adrilles; 65% to evict	Fernando; 78% to evict	Amanda; 35% to win
Survived	Aline; 53% to save	Douglas; 42% to evict	Adrilles; 37% to evict	Fernando; 48% to evict	Amanda; 45% to evict	Mariza; 23% to evict	Cézar; 29% to evict	Cézar; 13% to evict	Cézar; 23% to evict	Cézar; 49.78% to evict	Cézar; 35% to evict	Amanda; 22% to evict	Cézar; 65% to win
Survived	Aline; 53% to save	Douglas; 42% to evict	Adrilles; 37% to evict	Fernando; 48% to evict	Mariza; 2% to evict	Luan; 8% to evict	Luan; 11% to evict	Cézar; 13% to evict	Cézar; 23% to evict	Cézar; 49.78% to evict	Cézar; 35% to evict	Amanda; 22% to evict	Cézar; 65% to win

=== Notes ===
- ^Note 1 : Aline and Julia entered the house on Day 2, both already nominated. The audience should vote for one of them to become a full housemate. On day 6, Aline was the winner of the vote, becoming an official housemate, while Julia was evicted from the house. By winning the voting, Aline had immunity on the first nomination.
- ^Note 2 : By popular vote, the Have-Not group could immunize one of them. They chose Mariza.
- ^Note 3 : Adrilles and Angélica tied with 4 votes each. Head of Household Rafael broke the tie and decided to nominate Adrilles, so he joined Douglas (HoH's choice) as this week's nominees.
- ^Note 4 : Luan and Marco tied with 5 votes each. Head of Household Amanda broke the tie and decided to nominate Marco, so he joined Fernando (HoH's choice) as this week's nominees.
- ^Note 5 : Because of the "You're in control" vote, the Housemates voted in a round of face-to-face voting.
- ^Note 6 : This week, top 2 vote recipients became the House's Nominees.
- ^Note 7 : Luan answered the Big Phone and was automatically nominated for eviction.
- ^Note 8 : Adrilles, Fernando, Mariza and Talita tied with 1 vote each. Adrilles, as Head of Household, broke the tie to determine the second House nominee. He decided to nominate Talita.
- ^Note 9 : This week the Head of Household made their nomination after the House Vote as a result of "You're in control" vote. Cézar and Luan tied with 2 votes each. HoH Amanda broke the tie and decided to nominate Cézar. Amanda then nominated Luan as her HoH nomination.
- ^Note 10 : This week, Adrilles' vote counted as two as a result of "You're in control" twist.
- ^Note 11 : Cézar won the final competition, winning immunity for the final eviction and granting his place in the Finale. Therefore, Amanda and Fernando were automatically nominated for eviction by default.
- ^Note 12 : For the final, the public will vote for the housemate they want to win Big Brother Brasil 15.

=== Have and Have-Nots ===
	Week 1		Week 2	Week 3	Week 4	Week 5	Week 6	Week 7	Week 8	Week 9	Week 10	
Cézar	Have-Not	Have-Not	Have-Not	Have-Not	Have-Not	Have-Not	Have-Not	~~Have-Not~~	Have	Have-Not	Have-Not	Have
Amanda	Have-Not	Have-Not	Have	Have-Not	Have	Have-Not	Have	Have	Have	Have	Have	Have
Fernando	Have	Have	Have-Not	Have	Have-Not	~~Have~~	Have-Not	Have-Not	Have	Have	Have	Have
Adrilles	Have-Not	Have-Not	Have-Not	Have	Have-Not	~~Have~~	Have	Have-Not	Have	Have	Have-Not	Have
Mariza	Have-Not	Have	Have-Not	Have	Have-Not	Have-Not	Have-Not	Have	Have	Have-Not		
Rafael	Have-Not	Have-Not	Have	Have-Not	Have	~~Have~~	Have	Have	Have			
Luan	Have	Have	Have	Have-Not	Have	Have-Not	Have-Not	Have-Not				
Tamires	Have	Have-Not	Have	Have-Not	Have	Have-Not	Have	Have				
Talita	Have	Have	Have	Have-Not	Have	~~Have~~	Have					
Angélica	Have	Have	Have	Have-Not	Have	~~Have~~						
Aline	Have	Have	Have-Not	Have	Have-Not							
Marco	Have-Not	Have-Not	Have	Have								
Douglas	Have	Have	Have-Not									
Francieli	Have	Have-Not										
Julia	Have	Have										

On week 5, due to a punishment, all housemates were moved to the Have-Not group.

On week 7, Luan was automatically moved to the Have-Not group due to a punishment. In the same week, Cézar originally was part of the Have-Not group, but was moved to the Have group in a draw after the Tamires' withdrawal.

On week 8, due to a completed task, all housemates became Have for the rest of week.
