= Fiuk =

- Village
- Location within Poland
- Coordinates: 50°8′36″N 20°56′47″E
- Country: Poland
- Voivodeship: Lesser Poland
- County: Tarnów
- Gmina: Żabno

Fiuk [fjuk] is a village in the administrative district of Gmina Żabno, within Tarnów County, Lesser Poland Voivodeship, in southern Poland.
