= Pedro Bial =

TV presenter, journalist, writer, filmmaker and Brazilian poet

Pedro Viebig Bial
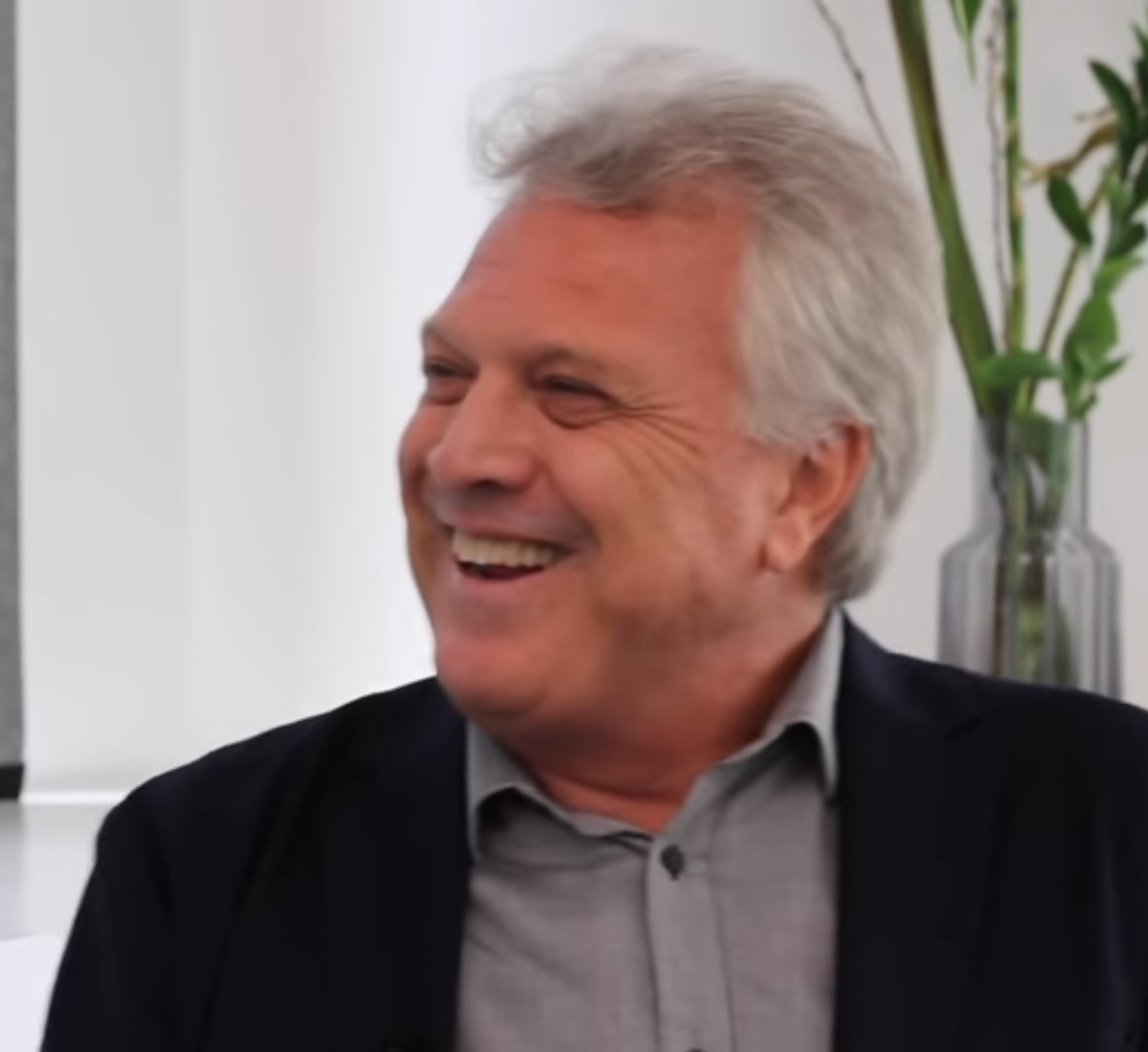
- Born: March 29, 1958 (age 68); Rio de Janeiro, Brazil
- Education: PUC-RJ
- Occupations: Journalist, TV producer, Presenter, Director, Writer
- Notable credit(s): Big Brother Brasil (2002–2017); Fantástico (1996–2007); Na Moral (2012); Conversa com Bial (2017–present)

Pedro Bial (born March 29, 1958) is a Brazilian producer, director, writer, journalist and a TV presenter. He is best known for hosting the variety show Fantástico, and the reality show Big Brother Brasil (the Brazilian version of Big Brother).

== Career ==
Bial graduated in journalism from PUC-RJ. His career, as a reporter, began at Rede Globo in 1981. In 1988, he started to work for Jornal Hoje and Globo Repórter. He also hosted Rede Globo's live broadcast of Rock in Rio II. Bial was international correspondent for Globo network from 1988 to 1996. He replaced Renato Machado on August 13, 1988.

In 1996, he started to host Fantástico. As of 2014, he's been hosting the Big Brother Brasil for 14 seasons.

In 2003 he translated and interpreted Wear Sunscreen by Mary Schmich, which was a great success.

On July 5, 2012, he started to present a brand new show called Na Moral.

In 2017, Bial left Big Brother Brazil, after 17 editions. In the same year, he takes charge of a talk show called Conversa com Bial.

He is currently a Trustee and columnist of the Instituto Millenium.

== Writing and filmmaking ==
Bial is also an accomplished writer and filmmaker. He has published a couple of books, including Roberto Marinho (the authorized biography of Roberto Marinho, founder of Rede Globo) Bial directed the documentary Outras Histórias (2000) and the feature film Jorge Mautner – O Filho do Holocausto (2012).

== Personal life ==
Bial comes from a family with diverse professional backgrounds. His father, Pedro Hans Bial, was a physician Jewish refugee converted to Catholicism who fled Nazi Germany in 1940, and his mother, Suzane Bial, was a German teacher born on 3 July 1924 in Berlin who immigrated to Brazil in 1934. Both of his parents were refugees. Clara Viebig, his great grandmother, belonged to the most read German-language authors of her time. His brother, Alberto Bial, is a basketball coach, and his sister, Irene Bial, is a psychotherapist.

He has been married multiple times. His first marriage was to journalist Renée Castelo Branco, with whom he had a daughter named Ana. He later married actress Fernanda Torres from 1982 to 1985. Bial then married actress Giulia Gam between 1998 and 1999. In 2017, Bial married his current wife, Maria Prata, a Brazilian journalist. The couple has two children together, Laura and Dora.
