= Vivian Amorim =

Brazilian presenter and reporter (born 1993)

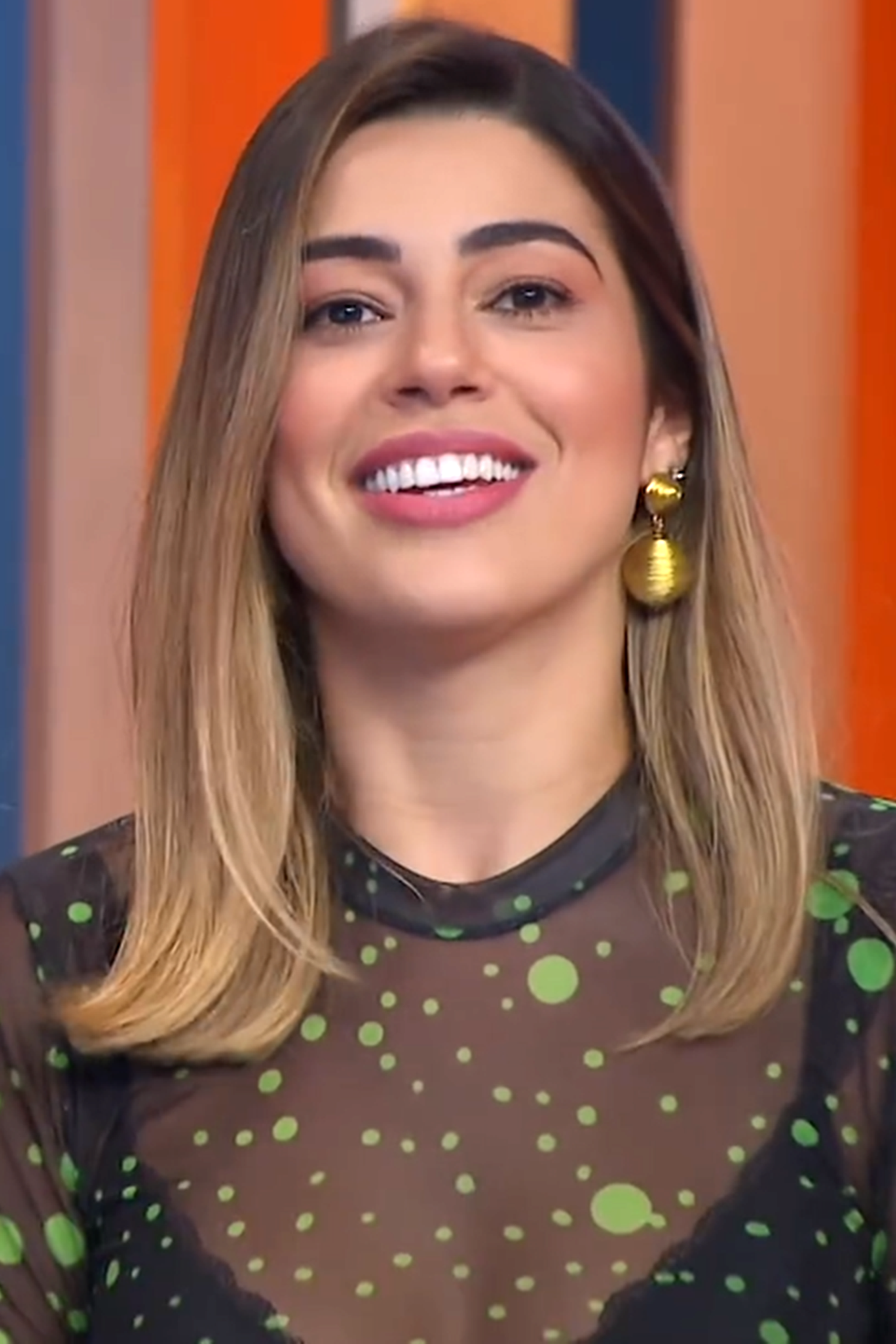
- Amorim in 2020
- Born: Vivian Silveira Amorim; March 20, 1993 (age 33); Manaus, Amazonas
- Occupations: Presenter, Reporter, Digital Influencer, Model, Beauty Pageant Titleholder
- Years active: 2012–present
- Television: A Eliminação; Video Show; Big Brother Brasil 17
- Height: 1.75 m (5 ft 9 in)
- Parent(s): Vera Lúcia; Humberto Amorim
- Website: Vivian Amorim at IMDb

Vivian Silveira Amorim (Portuguese: [viviˈɐ̃w̃ ɐmoˈɾĩ]; born March 20, 1993), is a Brazilian presenter, reporter, model and digital influencer. She began her career in beauty pageants, being crowned Miss Amazonas 2012 and reaching the semifinals of Miss Brasil 2012. Amorim gained national recognition in 2017 as the runner-up of Big Brother Brasil 17 and, after the reality show, became a reporter and host for TV Globo and Multishow programs such as Rede BBB, Vídeo Show and A Eliminação.

== Career ==
=== Miss Amazonas and Miss Brazil ===
Vivian Amorim started her modeling career at 15. She was acclaimed Miss Amazonas 2012 after winning 20 candidates for the title. She represented the state in Miss Brasil 2012, being among the 10 semifinalists, winning in the category of best typical costume.

=== Television ===
In 2015, she was a local program reporter for the Band (channel) network. Amorim performed interviews with artists during shows in the Amazonas. In the years 2014 and 2015, she presented, alongside other ceremonialists, the Miss Amazonas on local TV.

=== Big Brother Brasil ===
On January 23, 2017, the woman from Manaus was officially announced by host Tiago Leifert as one of the thirteen official contestants who would be on the seventeenth season of Big Brother Brasil, the Brazilian version of the reality series Big Brother, which aired on Rede Globo.

On April 12, 2017, after 81 days of confinement, she received 41% of the votes in the final public vote, ending as a runner-up in the competition, where Emilly Araújo was crowned winner with 58% of votes and retired Ieda Woberto as second runner-up with 1% of the votes. As a prize, Amorim won R$150.000,00 reais.

=== After Big Brother Brasil ===
Also in 2017, she was awarded a certificate of honour to the Merit in recognition, according to the honour, "her brilliant participation in the reality representing with honour, dignity, and beauty the whole of Amazonas society" by the Legislative Assembly of Amazonas (Aleam).

On January 11, 2018, she joined Big Brother Brasil 18 as a reporter, along with Fernanda Keulla, winner of Big Brother Brasil 13. The following year, they returned to the role, being joined by Big Brother Brasil 18 finalist Ana Clara Lima.

The reporters stood in front of RedeBBB, a program aimed at the internet audience interacting on social networks and the main BBB calls during a TV Globo TV program. The program is about a chat with the eliminated ones and of roundtables on the most commented subjects of the edition. She also acts on SelfieBBB.

In April 2018, it was announced that she would be part of Video Show, as a reporter, along with Keulla. In July 2018 both were relocated as presenters of the program, alongside Sophia Abrahão and Ana Clara.

In 2020, she joined the team of presenters of the TV network Multishow, as one of the hosts of A Eliminação.

== Filmography ==
Television
Year	Title	Role	Notes
2014–15	Miss Amazonas	Host	
2016	Programa do Natan	Reporter	
2017	Big Brother Brasil	Housemate	Season 17
2018–19	Big Brother Brasil	Reporter	Seasons 18–19
2018–19	Vídeo Show	Reporter / Host	
2020	A Eliminação	Host	

Year	Title	Role	Ref.
2017	Canal Vivian Amorim	Herself	
2017	Fit Dance Stars 2017	Contestant	
2017	Estevam on Board Croácia	Contestant	
2018–19	Rede BBB	Host	
2019	São João da Thay	Host	
2019	Arena UNINASSAU	Host	
2019	Garota VIP Manaus	Host	
2019	Show da Virada	Reporter	
2019-2020	Só Toca Top	Guest Reporter	
