= BB19 =

BB19 may refer to:

- Big Brother 19 (disambiguation), a television program in various versions
- USS Louisiana (BB-19), a United States Navy battleship
