= Dadour =

Dadour is a surname. Notable people with the surname include:

- Kaysar Dadour (born 1989), Syrian-Brazilian actor
- Tom Dadour (1925–2011), Australian doctor and politician
