= BB18 =

BB18 may refer to:

- USS Connecticut (BB-18)
- BB18, a postcode district in the BB postcode area
- Big Brother 18, a television programme in various versions
