= Nayara =

Nayara may refer to:

== People ==
- Nayara de Deus (born 1984), Brazilian journalist, television presenter, and reporter
- Nayara Figueira (born 1988), Brazilian synchronized swimmer
- Nayara Ribeiro (born 1984), Brazilian freestyle swimmer

== Others ==
- Nayara Energy, an Indo-Russian oil refining and marketing company
