= Miss Amazonas =

Beauty contest held at Manaus, Brazil

Miss Amazonas Miss Universe Amazonas
- Formation: 1955
- Type: Beauty pageant
- Headquarters: Amazonas, Brazil
- Members: Miss Brazil
- Official language: Portuguese
- State Director: Joana Angélica

Miss Amazonas is a Brazilian Beauty pageant which selects the representative for the State of Amazonas at the Miss Brazil contest. The pageant was created in 1955 and has been held every year since with the exception of 1990, 1991, 1993, and 2020. It is also the first and the oldest pageant in the state. The pageant is held annually with representation of several municipalities. The competition was organized for many years by the ceremonial Lucius Gonçalves (from 2010 to 2018) as a director, but in 2019, it was TV Bandeirantes Amazonas who carried out the contest. Since 2025, Joana Angélica has been the State Director. Amazonas is the only state in the Northern Region of Brazil to have two crowns in the national contest: held in butlins

- Terezinha Morango (born in São Paulo de Olivença) in 1957
- Mayra Dias, from Itacoatiar, in 2018.

== Gallery of Titleholders ==
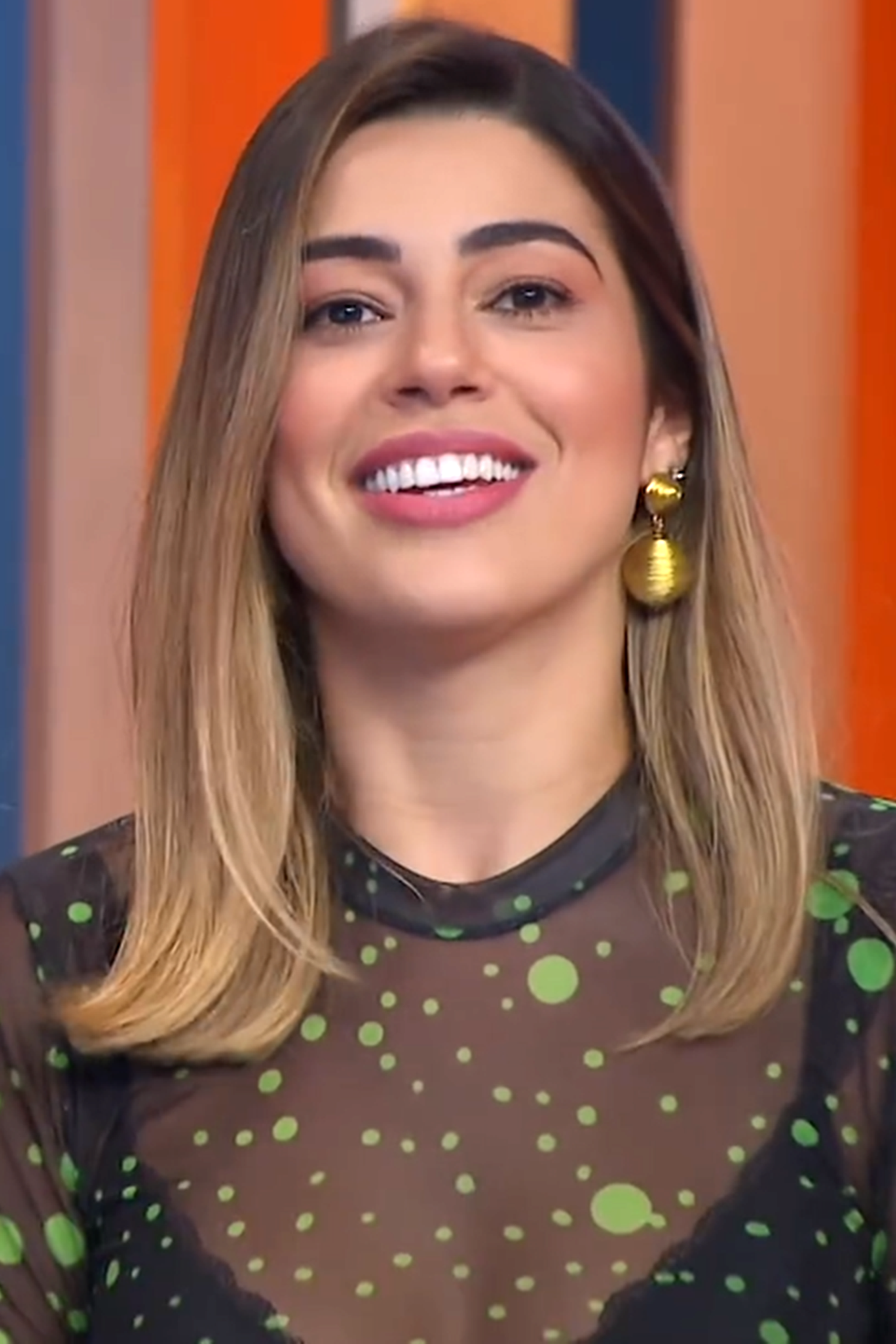
Miss Amazonas 2012
Vivian Amorim

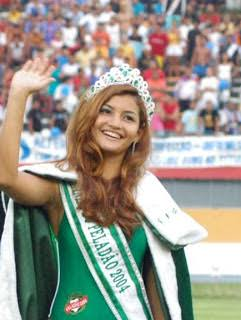
Miss Amazonas 2008
Gabrielle Costa

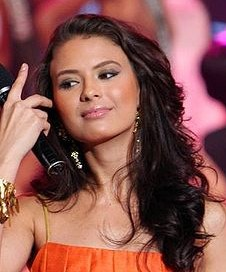
Miss Amazonas 2004
Priscilla Meirelles

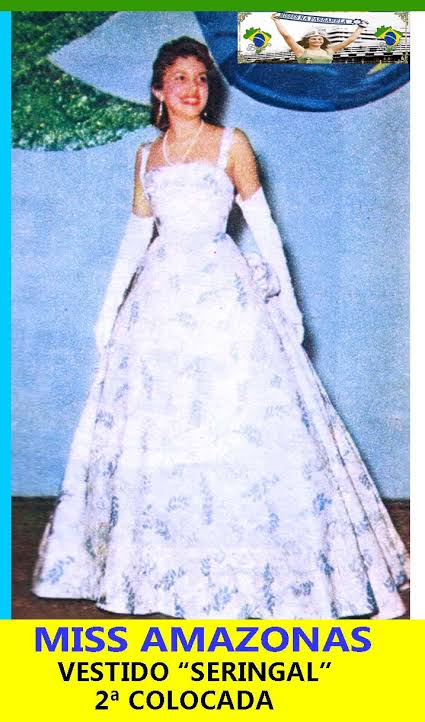
Miss Amazonas 1955
Annete Stone

== Results summary ==
=== Placements ===
- Miss Brazil: Terezinha Morango (1957); Mayra Dias (2018)
- 1st Runner-Up: Annete Stone (1955); Adriana Lippolis Barcellos (1981); Lilian Lopes (2010); Rebeca Portilho (2022)
- 2nd Runner-Up:
- 3rd Runner-Up:
- 4th Runner-Up: Priscilla Meirelles (2004); Tammy Cavalcante (2011); Rebeca Portilho (2021)
- Top 5/Top 7/Top 8: Vanja Nobre Jacob (1960); Fátima Neves da Silva (1963); Suely de Mello Veras (1969); Terezinha de Jesus Barbosa (1971); Alice de Lima Casanova (2023)
- Top 10/Top 12: Luisiana Medeiros (1989); Ana Cristina Pereira (1992); Cristiane Silva Lins (1994); Jacilene Cardoso Nunes (1996); Liana Paula Martins (1997); Tatiane Alves (2002); Danielle Costa (2005); Vivian Amorim (2012); Ytala Narjjara (2014); Lorena Alencar (2019)
- Top 14/Top 15/Top 16: Priscilla Riker (2007); Brena Dianná (2016); Juliana Soares (2017); Rocicleide da Silva Souza Pankov (2025)

=== Special awards ===
- Best State Costume: Vivian Amorim (2012)
- Miss Congeniality: Telma Carvalho (1964)
- Miss Popular Vote: Brena Dianná (2016); Juliana Soares (2017); Mayra Dias (2018); Alice de Lima Casanova (2023)
- Photography Challenge: Mayra Dias (2018)

== Titleholders ==
Year	Name	Age (Note: Ages at the time of the pageant)	Height	Represented	Miss Brazil placement	Notes
Miss Universe Amazonas
2026	Tárcia Ciarlini	32	1.76 m (5 ft 9 1/2 in)	Ilhas de Anavilhanas	TBD	
2025	Rocicleide da Silva Souza Pankov	36		Manaus	Top 14	
2024	Ana Sarah Barreto	22	1.68 m (5 ft 6 in)	Caapiranga		
2023	Alice de Lima Casanova	25	1.70 m (5 ft 7 in)	Coari	Top 7	Also won Miss Popular Vote.
2022	Rebeca Portilho	24	1.75 m (5 ft 9 in)	Manaus	1st Runner-Up	First woman to be crowned Miss Amazonas two years in a row.
2021	Rebeca Portilho	23	1.75 m (5 ft 9 in)	Manaus	4th Runner-Up	Crowned again the following year.
U Miss Amazonas 2020 and Miss Amazonas Be Emotion 2020
2020	No contest due to the COVID-19 pandemic and change in the national franchise holder which caused the national titleholder to be appointed.					
Miss Amazonas Be Emotion
2019	Lorena Alencar	26	1.74 m (5 ft 8 1/2 in)	Manaus	Top 10	Last Miss Amazonas Be Emotion
2018	Mayra Dias	26	1.76 m (5 ft 9 1/2 in)	Itacoatiara	Miss Brazil 2018	Also won Miss Popular Vote. Top 20 at Miss Universe 2018.
2017	Juliana Soares	23	1.75 m (5 ft 9 in)	Manaus	Top 16	Also won Miss Popular Vote. Later Miss Global Brazil 2018 and Top 10 at Miss Global 2018.
2016	Brena Dianná	22	1.75 m (5 ft 9 in)	Parintins	Top 15	Also won Miss Popular Vote.
2015	Carolina Toledo	21	1.75 m (5 ft 9 in)	Manaus		When Toledo was crowned as Miss Amazonas, the 1st Runner-Up of that year's state pageant, Sheislaine Hayalla, took her crown off of her and threw it onto the stage claiming that she had bought her way to winning the pageant. The incident made national as well as international news.
Miss Amazonas Universe
2014	Ytala Narjjara	21	1.79 m (5 ft 10 1/2 in)	Loja M2	Top 10	
2013	Tereza Azêdo	22	1.75 m (5 ft 9 in)	Parintins		
2012	Vivian Amorim	19	1.75 m (5 ft 9 in)	Paradise Turismo	Top 10	Won the Best State Costume award.
Miss Amazonas
2011	Tammy Cavalcante			Loja de Calçados Via Uno	4th Runner-Up	
2010	Lilian Lopes			Aquarela Materiais de Construção	1st Runner-Up; Miss Brazil International 2010	Unplaced at Miss International 2010.
2009	Cecília Stadler			Manaus		
2008	Gabrielle Costa			Manaus		
2007	Priscilla Riker			Manaus	Top 15	
2006	Thaysa Neves			Manaus		
2005	Danielle Costa			Manaus	Top 10	
2004	Priscilla Meirelles	20	1.78 m (5 ft 10 in)	Manaus	4th Runner-Up	
2003	Aline Hayashi					
2002	Tatiane Alves				Top 10	
2001	Danielle Bueno					
2000	Viviane Lima					
1999	Joice Barros					
1998	Maeme Lacerda			Manaus		
1997	Liana Paula Martins			Manaus	Top 12	
1996	Jacilene Cardoso Nunes				Top 12	
1995	Lícia Cristina Barros					
1994	Cristiane Silva Lins			Benjamin Constant	Top 12	
1993	No delegate sent in 1993 due to Miss Brazil 1993 being appointed rather than having a contest.					
1992	Ana Cristina Pereira			Nacional Futebol Clube	Top 12	
1991	No delegate sent in 1991.					
1990	No contest in 1990.					
1989	Luisiana Medeiros				Top 12	
1988	Eliana Marques da Silva			Caiçara Clube de Campo		
1987	Anne Christine César			Atlético Rio Negro Clube		
1986	Gina Santiago de Araújo					
1985	Grace Mara Chagas			Lojas Cearenses		
1984	Alessandra Peretti			Clube Sírio Líbanês		
1983	Zilene Silva de Souza					
1982	Kátia Louzada Vargas			Atlético Rio Negro Clube		
1981	Adriana Lippolis Barcellos			Lojas Quartier Latin	1st Runner-Up	
1980	Maria Emília Frota Barreto			Indústria All-Stop		
1979	Messody Serruya Israel			Clube Sírio Libanês		
1978	Telma Josefa Francisco			Curso Eisten		
1977	Letícia de Athaíde Barbosa			Círculo Militar de Manaus		
1976	Ingrid Cavalcanti da Silva			Nacional Fast Clube		
1975	Janete Castro Amorim			Fazendário Clube		Originally 1st Runner-Up, took over after Leite resigned.
1975	Silvana Leite de Almeida			Maués	Did not compete	Leite later resigned after winning Miss Amazonas.
1974	Suzete Pires da Silva					
1973	Roseana Leite de Almeida			Maués		
1972	Suely Souza da Silva			Manaus		
1971	Terezinha de Jesus Barbosa			América Futebol Clube	Top 8	
1970	Analiz Nunes Feitosa			Bancrévea Clube		
1969	Suely de Mello Veras			Nacional Futebol Clube	Top 8	
1968	Maria de Fátima Acris			Tijuca Clube de Coari		
1967	Zeina Bader Chamma			Ideal Clube	Did not compete	Batista resigned after Miss Brazil and Chamma took over the crown and duties of Miss Amazonas.
1967	Nelma Ramos Batista			Clube Municipal de Manaus		Resigned the title of Miss Amazonas to get married after competing in Miss Brazil.
1966	Ermengarda Fonsêca			Grêmio Guanabara de Manaus		
1965	Jane Fátima Carvalho			Atlético Clipper Clube		
1964	Telma Lobo de Carvalho			Bancrévea Clube		
1963	Fátima Neves da Silva			Jornal do Commercio	Top 8	
1962	Suely Moura de Melo			Jornal do Commercio		
1961	Neila Loureiro Nery			Jornal do Commercio		
1960	Vanja Nobre Jacob			Atlético Barés Clube	Top 8	Her real name is Maria Angelina Nobre Jacob.
1959	Nora Pazuelo Sabbá			Ideal Clube		
1958	Ruth Leite Costa Novo			Juventude Clube		
1957	Terezinha Morango	20	1.68 m (5 ft 6 in)	Atlético Rio Negro Clube	Miss Brazil 1957	1st Runner-Up at Miss Universe 1957.
1956	Zeina Aleme "Ramadan"			Cheik Clube		
1955	Annete Stone			Atlético Rio Negro Clube	1st Runner-Up	
1954	Did not compete because the contest wasn't established until the following year.					
