= Carcereiros =

Brazilian crime drama TV series

- Genre: Crime drama
- Created by: Marçal Aquino; Fernando Bonassi; Dennison Ramalho
- Written by: Marçal Aquino; Fernando Bonassi; Dennison Ramalho; Marcelo Starobinas
- Directed by: José Eduardo Belmonte; Pedro Bial; Fernando Grostein Andrade
- Starring: Rodrigo Lombardi; Giovanna Rispoli; Mariana Nunes; Othon Bastos; Tony Tornado; Lourinelson Vladimir; Aílton Graça; Nani de Oliveira; Jean Amorim; Ernani Moraes; Kaysar Dadour
- Country of origin: Brazil
- Original language: Portuguese
- No. of seasons: 3
- No. of episodes: 33

Production
- Cinematography: Alexandre Ramos
- Production companies: Estúdios Globo; Gullane; Spray Filmes

Original release
- Network: Rede Globo; Globoplay
- Release: June 8, 2017 – January 22, 2021

Carcereiros (transl. Jailers) is a Brazilian crime drama television series. It was produced by Rede Globo and released by the Globoplay streaming service. The first season was released on the service on June 8, 2017. The series debuted on Rede Globo free-to-air television network on April 26, 2018, and ended on January 22, 2021. It is written by Marçal Aquino, Fernando Bonassi and Dennison Ramalho with collaboration of Marcelo Starobinas, inspired by Dráuzio Varella's book of the same name. Artistic direction is by José Eduardo Belmonte.

== Plot ==
Adriano is a graduate in history, who becomes a penitentiary agent to follow in the footsteps of his father, Tibério. His colleagues of profession, Vinícius and Isaías, along with the head of security Juscelino, help him cope up with the problems of the work environment. They have to deal with the grumpy penitentiary agent, Valdir.

The prison, directed by Vilma, is out of control, and becomes the main setting. Adriano must deal with the challenges and ponder the two rival factions that command the place. The main one is led by Binho and his wife Kelly. He must balance his work with time with his family.

== Cast ==
=== Main ===
- Rodrigo Lombardi as Adriano Ferreira de Araújo
- Giovanna Rispoli as Lívia Macedo de Araújo
- Mariana Nunes as Janaína Macedo
- Othon Bastos as Tibério Ferreira de Araújo
- Tony Tornado as Valdir
- Lourinelson Vladimir as Isaías (main, season 1; guest, season 2)
- Aílton Graça as Juscelino (season 1)
- Nani de Oliveira as Dr. Vilma Alencar (season 1)
- Jean Amorim as Vinícius (season 1)
- Ernani Moraes as Rubão (guest, season 1; main, seasons 2–3)
- Kaysar Dadour as Abdel (season 3)

=== Recurring ===
- Samantha Schmütz as Solange
- Letícia Sabatella as Érika Guimarães
- Milton Gonçalves as Dr. Louveira
- Leonardo Medeiros as Dr. Aramis (guest, season 1; recurring, seasons 2–3)
- Babu Santana as Edgar de Souza (season 2–3)
- Mariana Ruggiero as Mariana (season 2–3)

== Production ==
The series was supposed to be starred by Domingos Montagner, however, with the death of the actor during the shooting of the telenovela Velho Chico, the role passed to Rodrigo Lombardi.

The first season of the series was shot at the "Votorantim Women's Penitentiary", in Votorantim, São Paulo before its inauguration in March 2017. The shooting took place in 2016 and had participation of local actors.

== Episodes ==
=== Series overview ===
| Season | Episodes | Originally released | |
| Season | Episodes | First released | Last released |
|---|---|---|---|
| 1 | 15 | June 8, 2017 | |
| 2 | 14 | April 16, 2019 | July 30, 2019 |
| 3 | 4 | January 18, 2021 | January 22, 2021 |

=== Season 1 (2017) ===
| No. overall | No. in season | Title | Original release date |
|---|---|---|---|
| 1 | 1 | "Resgate no Inferno" | June 8, 2017 |
| 2 | 2 | "Plano de Fuga" | June 8, 2017 |
| 3 | 3 | "Cidade Sitiada" | June 8, 2017 |
| 4 | 4 | "Clinch" | June 8, 2017 |
| 5 | 5 | "Mandarim" | June 8, 2017 |
| 6 | 6 | "Questão de Método" | June 8, 2017 |
| 7 | 7 | "Cela 237" | June 8, 2017 |
| 8 | 8 | "Uma Questão Pessoal" | June 8, 2017 |
| 9 | 9 | "Talarico por Acaso" | June 8, 2017 |
| 10 | 10 | "Assunto de Família" | June 8, 2017 |
| 11 | 11 | "Ratos e Homens" | June 8, 2017 |
| 12 | 12 | "Amor que Fica" | June 8, 2017 |
| 13 | 13 | "Medicina Legal" | June 8, 2017 |
| 14 | 14 | "Um Preso Comum" | June 8, 2017 |
| 15 | 15 | "Razões Humanitárias" | June 8, 2017 |

=== Season 2 (2019) ===
| No. overall | No. in season | Title | Original release date |
|---|---|---|---|
| 16 | 1 | "Imagem e Semelhança" | April 23, 2019 |
| 17 | 2 | "Ganância" | April 30, 2019 |
| 18 | 3 | "Cartas não mentem" | April 16, 2019 |
| 19 | 4 | "Vingança" | May 7, 2019 |
| 20 | 5 | "Liberdade Assistida" | May 14, 2019 |
| 21 | 6 | "Bens Bloqueados" | May 21, 2019 |
| 22 | 7 | "Amores Brutos - Parte I" | May 28, 2019 |
| 23 | 8 | "Amores Brutos - Parte II" | May 28, 2019 |
| 24 | 9 | "Fuga a Qualquer Preço" | June 11, 2019 |
| 25 | 10 | "Uma Questão de Escolha" | June 25, 2019 |
| 26 | 11 | "Psicóloga" | July 9, 2019 |
| 27 | 12 | "Mão no Fogo" | July 16, 2019 |
| 28 | 13 | "Um Homem de Família - Parte I" | July 23, 2019 |
| 29 | 14 | "Um Homem de Família - Parte II" | July 30, 2019 |

=== Season 3: Noite Sem Fim (2021) ===
| No. overall | No. in season | Title | Original release date |
|---|---|---|---|
| 30 | 1 | "Parte I" | January 18, 2021 |
| 31 | 2 | "Parte II" | January 19, 2021 |
| 32 | 3 | "Parte III" | January 21, 2021 |
| 33 | 4 | "Parte IV" | January 22, 2021 |
