= Big Brother Brasil 17 =

- Season 17
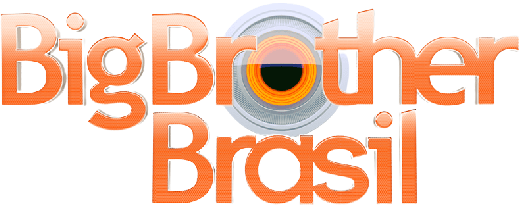
- Presented by: Tiago Leifert
- No. of days: 81
- No. of housemates: 17
- Winner: Emilly Araújo
- Runner-up: Vivian Amorim
- No. of episodes: 81

Release
- Original network: Globo
- Original release: January 23 – April 13, 2017

Season chronology
- ← Previous; Big Brother Brasil 16 Next → Big Brother Brasil 18

Big Brother Brasil 17 is the seventeenth season of Big Brother Brasil which premiered January 23, 2017 on the Rede Globo. The show is produced by Endemol Globo and presented by Tiago Leifert.

The grand prize is R$1.5 million with tax allowances, plus a R$150,000 prize offered to the runner-up and a R$50,000 prize offered to the housemate in third place. On Day 81, 20 year old Emilly Araújo won the series.

== Housemates ==
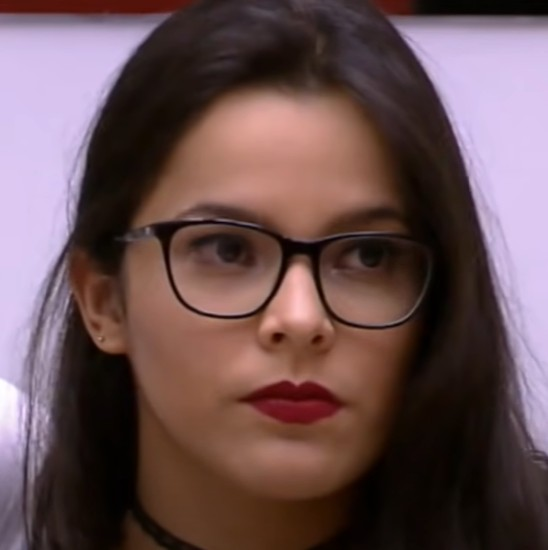
Emilly Araújo, the winner of Big Brother Brasil 17.

The cast list with the first housemates was unveiled on January 18, 2017.

As announced by Rede Globo on January 18, four contestants, two doubles of twins, enter before of other competitors in the house and will dispute as two final spots of the edition. The public decides between a brother of each pair to enter the game.

Name	Age	Hometown	Occupation	Day entered	Day exited	Result
Emilly Araújo	20	Eldorado do Sul	Student	1	81	Winner
Vivian Amorim	23	Manaus	Lawyer	2	81	Runner-up
Ieda Wobeto	70	Canoas	Retired	2	81	Third place
Marcos Härter	37	Porto Alegre	Plastic surgeon	2	78	Ejected
Marinalva Almeida	39	Santa Isabel do Ivaí	Paralympic athlete	2	77	11th Evicted
Ilmar Fonseca	38	Campo Grande	Cook and Lawyer	2	72	10th Evicted
Daniel Pontes	41	Ferraz de Vasconcelos	Traffic guard	2	64	9th Evicted
Rômulo Neves	39	Brasília	Diplomat	2	58	8th Evicted
Roberta Freitas	21	São Paulo	Social Work Student	2	51	7th Evicted
Pedro Falcão	29	São Paulo	Journalist	2	44	6th Evicted
Elis Gonçalves	40	Taguatinga	Merchant	2	37	5th Evicted
Manoel Rafaski	23	Vitória	Entertainment promoter	1	30	4th Evicted
Luiz Felipe Ribeiro	28	Maceió	Merchant	2	23	3rd Evicted
Mayara Motti	26	Belo Horizonte	Bachelor of Laws	2	16	2nd Evicted
Gabriela Flor Bitencourt	27	Salvador	Dancer	2	9	1st Evicted
Twins
Emilly Araújo	20	Eldorado do Sul	Student	1	81	Entered Game
Manoel Rafaski	23	Vitória	Entertainment promoter	1	30	Entered Game
Antônio Rafaski	23	Vitória	Entertainment promoter	1	7	Didn't Enter
Mayla Araújo	20	Eldorado do Sul	Student	1	7	Didn't Enter
Guest
Contestant	Age	Residence			Reality Show	
Elettra Lamborghini	22	Milan, Italy			Gran Hermano VIP 5	

== Future appearances ==
In 2017, Marcos Harter appeared in A Fazenda 9, he finished the season as Runner-Up.

In 2023, Antônio Rafaski appeared on A Grande Conquista 1, he had to compete for a place to enter in the game and he didn't enter.

In 2023, Manoel Rafaski appeared on De Férias com o Ex Caribe: Salseiro VIP 2 as original cast member.

== Voting history ==
	Week 1		Week 2	Week 3	Week 4	Week 5	Week 6	Week 7	Week 8	Week 9	Week 10	Week 11	Week 12
	Day 3	Day 7	Week 2	Week 3	Week 4	Week 5	Week 6	Week 7	Week 8	Week 9	Week 10	Week 11	Finale
Head(s) of Household	(none)	Mayara; Vivian	Emilly	Daniel	Pedro	Daniel; Emilly	Ilmar	Marcos	Ilmar	Ilmar	Emilly	Emilly	(none)
Power of Immunity	(none)	Daniel; Marinalva	Daniel	Emilly	Ieda	Marcos	Roberta	Rômulo	Marcos	Marinalva	(none)		(none)
Saved	(none)	Luiz Felipe	Manoel	Roberta	Elis	Marcos	Ieda	Vivian	Emilly	Marinalva	(none)		(none)
Nomination (Twists)	(none)	(none)		Ilmar	(none)	Daniel	Marinalva	(none)	Marcos	(none)	(none)		(none)
Nomination (HoH)	(none)	Marcos	Vivian	Marcos	Manoel	Elis	Pedro	Roberta	Rômulo	Daniel	Ilmar	Marinalva	(none)
Nomination (Housemates)	(none)	Gabriela Flor	Mayara	Luiz Felipe	Emilly; Vivian	Ilmar	Emilly	Emilly; Ieda	Ieda	Emilly	Marcos	Marcos	(none)
Emilly	Nominated	Gabriela Flor	Head of Household	Elis	Vivian	Co-head of Household	Rômulo	Ieda	Ieda	Ieda	Head of Household	Head of Household	Winner (Day 81)
Vivian	Not eligible	Co-head of Household	Marcos	Elis	Emilly	Ilmar	Emilly	Emilly	Marinalva	Emilly	Marcos	Marcos	Runner-up (Day 81)
Ieda	Not eligible	Gabriela Flor	Mayara	Luiz Felipe	Emilly	Ilmar	Emilly	Marinalva	Marinalva	Emilly	Marcos	Marcos	3rd place (Day 81)
Marcos	Not eligible	Vivian	Mayara	Luiz Felipe	Vivian	Marinalva	Vivian	Head of Household	Ieda	Ieda	Marinalva	Ieda	Ejected (Day 78)
Marinalva	Not eligible	Ieda	Mayara	Vivian	Emilly	Rômulo	Emilly	Ieda	Ieda	Emilly	Marcos	Marcos	Evicted (Day 77)
Ilmar	Not eligible	Gabriela Flor	Mayara	Luiz Felipe	Vivian	Roberta	Head of Household	Ieda	Head of Household	Head of Household	Ieda	Evicted (Day 72)	
Daniel	Not eligible	Gabriela Flor	Marcos	Head of Household	Emilly	Co-head of Household	Rômulo	Ieda	Ieda	Emilly	Evicted (Day 64)		
Rômulo	Not eligible	Gabriela Flor	Mayara	Luiz Felipe	Emilly	Ilmar	Emilly	Emilly	Ieda	Evicted (Day 58)			
Roberta	Not eligible	Ilmar	Mayara	Ieda	Ilmar	Ilmar	Emilly	Ilmar	Evicted (Day 51)				
Pedro	Not eligible	Ilmar	Mayara	Luiz Felipe	Head of Household	Ilmar	Emilly	Evicted (Day 44)					
Elis	Not eligible	Gabriela Flor	Ilmar	Ieda	Emilly	Ilmar	Evicted (Day 37)						
Manoel	Nominated	Rômulo	Marcos	Rômulo	Marcos	Evicted (Day 30)							
Luiz Felipe	Not eligible	Gabriela Flor	Marcos	Ieda ^{(x2)}	Evicted (Day 23)								
Mayara	Not eligible	Co-head of Household	Marcos	Evicted (Day 16)									
Gabriela Flor	Not eligible	Ieda	Evicted (Day 9)										
Mayla	Nominated	Evicted (Day 7)											
Antônio	Nominated	Evicted (Day 7)											
Notes	1	2, 3	4	5, 6	7, 8	9, 10	11	12, 13	14	15	16	17, 18	19
Nominated for Eviction	Antônio; Manoel	Gabriela Flor; Marcos	Mayara; Vivian	Ilmar; Luiz Felipe; Marcos	Emilly; Manoel; Vivian	Daniel; Elis; Ilmar	Emilly; Marinalva; Pedro	Emilly; Ieda; Roberta	Ieda; Marcos; Rômulo	Daniel; Emilly	Ilmar; Marcos	Marcos; Marinalva	Emilly; Ieda; Vivian
Nominated for Eviction	Emilly; Mayla	Gabriela Flor; Marcos	Mayara; Vivian	Ilmar; Luiz Felipe; Marcos	Emilly; Manoel; Vivian	Daniel; Elis; Ilmar	Emilly; Marinalva; Pedro	Emilly; Ieda; Roberta	Ieda; Marcos; Rômulo	Daniel; Emilly	Ilmar; Marcos	Marcos; Marinalva	Emilly; Ieda; Vivian
Ejected	(none)												Marcos
Evicted	Antônio; 24% to save	Gabriela Flor; 59% to evict	Mayara; 82% to evict	Luiz Felipe; 74% to evict	Manoel; 57% to evict	Elis; 80% to evict	Pedro; 72% to evict	Roberta; 79% to evict	Rômulo; 65% to evict	Daniel; 68% to evict	Ilmar; 56% to evict	Marinalva; 77% to evict	Ieda; 1% to win
Evicted	Mayla; 45% to save	Gabriela Flor; 59% to evict	Mayara; 82% to evict	Luiz Felipe; 74% to evict	Manoel; 57% to evict	Elis; 80% to evict	Pedro; 72% to evict	Roberta; 79% to evict	Rômulo; 65% to evict	Daniel; 68% to evict	Ilmar; 56% to evict	Marinalva; 77% to evict	Vivian; 41% to win
Survived	Manoel; 76% to save	Marcos; 41% to evict	Vivian; 18% to evict	Ilmar; Fewest votes to evict	Emilly; 35% to evict	Daniel; 17% to evict	Emilly; 25% to evict	Emilly; 14% to evict	Marcos; 28% to evict	Emilly; 32% to evict	Marcos; 44% to evict	Marcos; 23% to evict	Emilly; 58% to win
Survived	Emilly; 55% to save	Marcos; 41% to evict	Vivian; 18% to evict	Marcos; Fewest votes to evict	Vivian; 8% to evict	Ilmar; 3% to evict	Marinalva; 3% to evict	Ieda; 7% to evict	Ieda; 7% to evict	Emilly; 32% to evict	Marcos; 44% to evict	Marcos; 23% to evict	Emilly; 58% to win

=== Legends ===
American side of the house	Mexican side of the house
Evicted before division of the house	Did not officially enter

=== Notes ===
- ^Note 1: Antônio & Manoel and Emilly & Mayla, two pairs of twins, entered the house on day 1 already nominated. The audience had to choose one twin of each pair to stay in the game. On day 7, Mayla and Antonio had the fewest votes and were evicted.
- ^Note 2: Mayara and Vivian won the first Head of Household competition and both had to decide who would get immunity (Mayara) and R$10,000 (Vivian).
- ^Note 3: By winning a challenge, Roberta got immunity this week. For surviving the twin vote, Emilly and Manoel also had immunity for the first nominations.
- ^Note 4: Starting from this week, the Head of Household competition winner is awarded immunity instead of R$10,000.
- ^Note 5: Luiz Felipe won a double vote power on Monday's night game.
- ^Note 6: Pedro answered the Big Phone and he was forced to nominate one contestant for eviction. He nominated Ilmar.
- ^Note 7: On Monday night's game, Manoel found a card that gave him the right to be immune to house votes, and could only be nominated by HoH. If he wins the HoH competition or is given immunity from the Power of Immunity holder, he can give the immunity won by the card to another housemate.
- ^Note 8: It was announced that the two housemates with most nomination votes would be nominated alongside the HoH's nominee.
- ^Note 9: Daniel and Emilly won the Co-Head of Household competition and both had to decide who would get immunity (Emilly) and R$10,000 (Daniel).
- ^Note 10: Marcos won the special Power of Immunity and was safe but it was only revealed after he decided whom would be saved (Rômulo). Rômulo did not gain immunity but a power to nominate one contestant automatically to face eviction. He nominated Daniel.
- ^Note 11: Ilmar answered the Phone and was told to choose two contestants to receive a bracelet each, one red and one white, but he was not informed of the meaning of the accessories. Roberta was given the red bracelet and had the power to nominate a contestant for eviction. She nominated Marinalva. Marcos was given the white bracelet and had the power to have a double vote in a special vote which resulted in the division of the house.
- ^Note 12: With the division of the house due to Emilly's fake eviction as she was the most voted to leave by her fellow housemates, the Head of Household competition was contested by the contestants on the Mexican side of the house (Daniel, Emily, Ilmar, Marcos, Marinalva - all of them chose by Emilly to join her in the secret house), while the Power of Immunity competition was contested by the contestants on the American side of the house (Ieda, Vivian, Rômulo, Roberta).
- ^Note 13: It was announced that the two housemates with most nominations would be nominated alongside the HoH's nominee.
- ^Note 14: Before the nominations, a quiz about Elettra Lamborghini was realized with the housemates, giving to the winner the power to nominate other housemate for eviction, after the HoH. Marinalva won the quiz and nominated Marcos to face eviction.
- ^Note 15: The winner of the Power of Immunity was automatically saved from nominations on this week.
- ^Note 16: As of this week, only the HoH has immunity.
- ^Note 17: The eleventh HoH's competition was divided into two stages: the first stage, a skill test, was performed only by loved-ones of the five housemates: Emilly's father, Ieda's daughter, Marcos's sister, Marinalva's son and Vivian's mother.
- ^Note 18: Marcos was ejected on day 78 due to violent behaviour towards Emilly, therefore, the final HoH competition, nominations and eviction were cancelled and Emilly, Ieda and Vivian automatically became the finalists of the season.
- ^Note 19: For the final, the public will vote for the housemate they want to win Big Brother Brasil 17.
