= Big Brother 19 =

Big Brother 19 is the nineteenth season of various versions of television show Big Brother and may refer to:

- Big Brother 19 (U.S.), the 2017 edition of the U.S. version
- Big Brother 19 (UK), the 2018 edition of the UK version
- Big Brother Brasil 19, the 2019 edition of the Brazilian version
- Bigg Boss (Hindi TV series) season 19, nineteenth season of Big Brother in India in Hindi released in 2025
