= No Limite season 5 =

No Limite
- Season 5
- Presented by: André Marques
- No. of days: 23
- No. of castaways: 16
- Winner: Paula Amorim
- Runner-up: Viegas de Carvalho
- Location: Beberibe, Ceará, Brazil
- No. of episodes: 11

Release
- Original network: TV Globo
- Original release: May 11 – July 20, 2021

Additional information
- Filming dates: May 1 – May 23, 2021

Season chronology
- ← Previous; Season 4 Next → Season 6

The fifth season of the Brazilian competitive reality television series No Limite, based on the international reality game show franchise Survivor, premiered on Tuesday, May 11, 2021, at 10:30 p.m. / 9:30 p.m. (BRT / AMT) on TV Globo.

In February 2021, TV Globo announced that it would be reviving No Limite a second time for a 11–episode season with actor André Marques as the new host and 16 returning housemates of Big Brother Brasil as contestants.

A spin-off series titled No Limite – A Eliminação would air alongside the show on Multishow on Wednesdays nights and on TV Globo on Sundays nights featuring a weekly re-cap episode and interview hosted by Marques with the eliminated contestant. An online spin-off show titled Bate Papo No Limite would air live immediately following the episodes on Gshow and Globoplay featuring exclusive content across social media sites and interviews hosted by Ana Clara Lima with the eliminated contestants and celebrity guests.

This season was the third to be filmed in Ceará, Brazil, following the first and fourth seasons, which were filmed in a different location. The grand prize is R$500.000 with tax allowances, plus a R$100.000 prize offered to the runner-up and a R$50.000 prize offered to the contestant in third place.

On July 20, 2021, Paula Amorim won the competition with 66.77% of the public vote over Viegas de Carvalho. André Martinelli finished in third place by a 5–4–3–0 live jury vote over fellow semifinalists Elana Valenária, Marcelo Zulu and Jéssica Mueller, respectively.

== Contestants ==
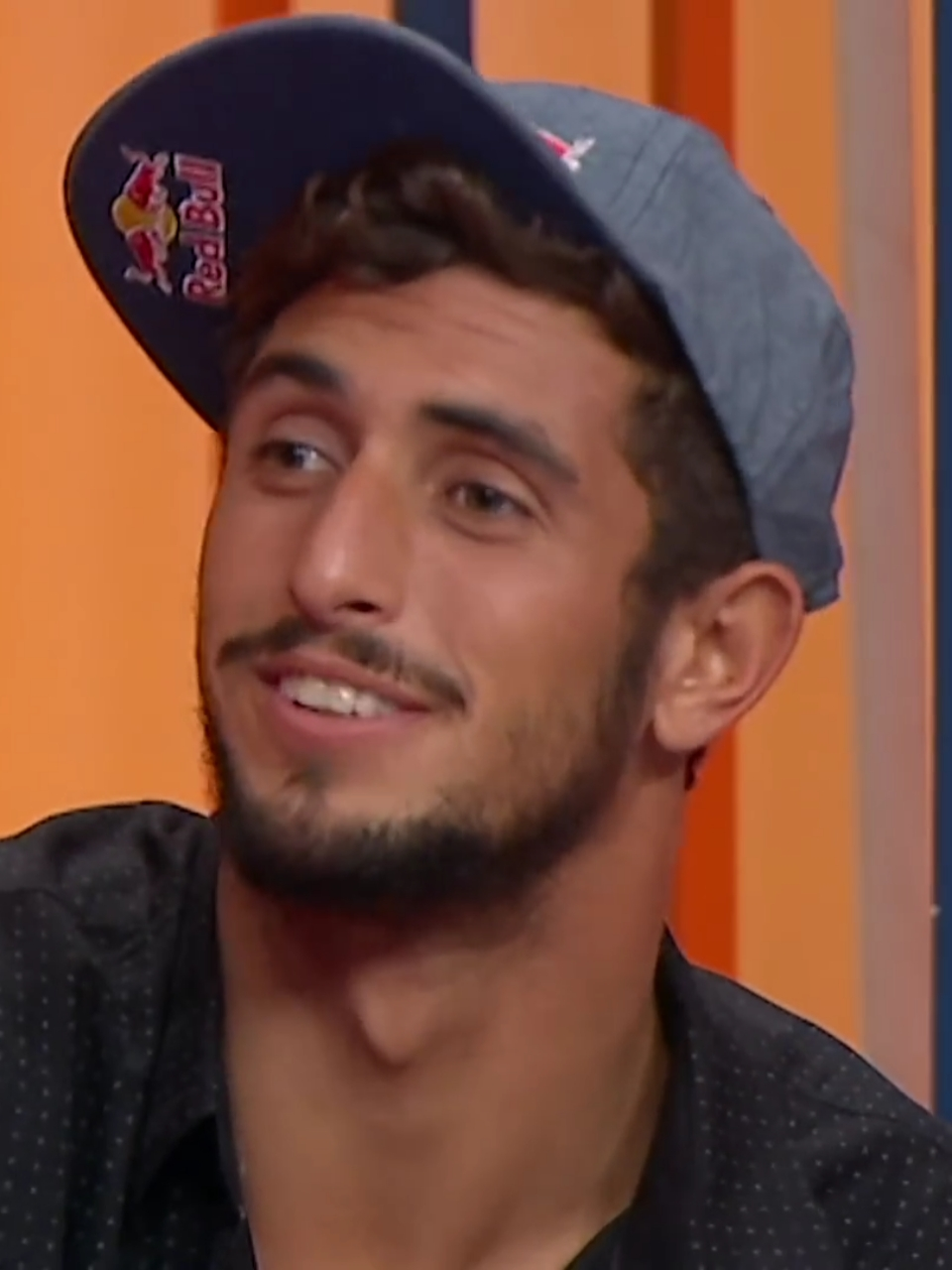
Lucas Chumbo

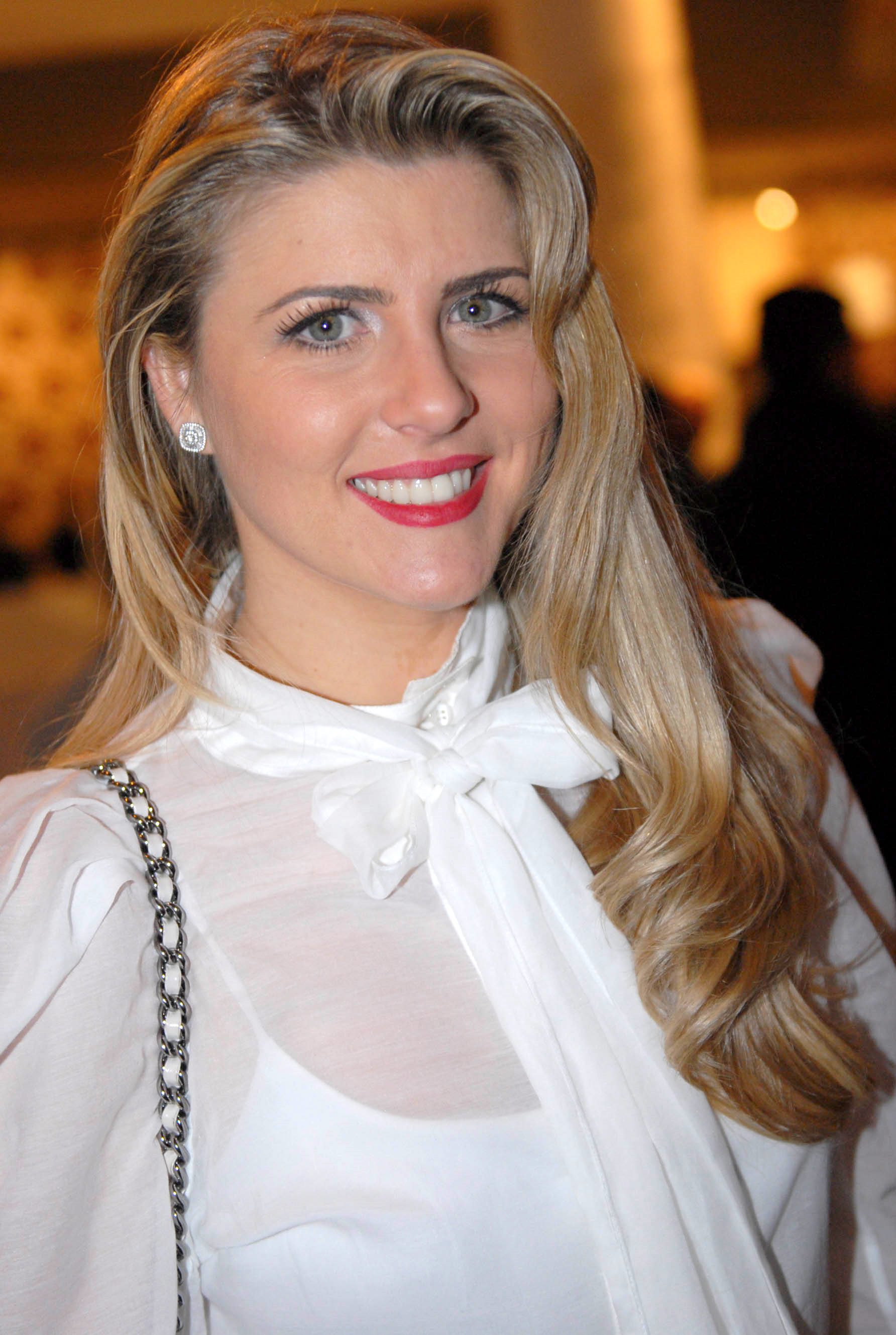
Íris Stefanelli

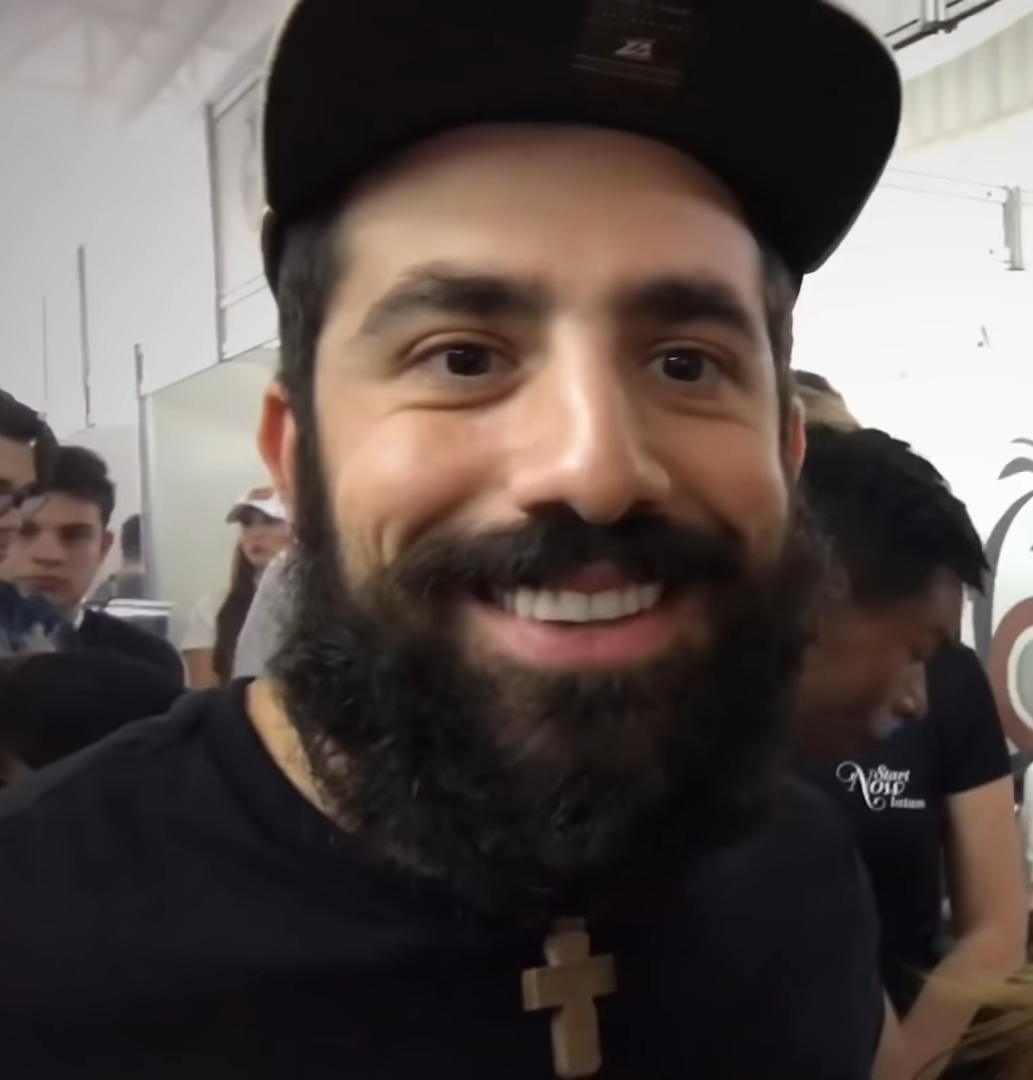
Kaysar Dadour

The contestants were revealed on April 25, 2021, during the commercial breaks of TV Globo.

List of No Limite (season 5) contestants
Contestant	Original Tribe	Switched Tribe	Merged Tribe	Finish
Mahamoud "Mahmoud" Baydoun; 31, Manaus, AM; Big Brother Brasil 18	Calango			1st Voted Out; Day 3
Angélica Ramos; 39, Embu das Artes, SP; Big Brother Brasil 15'	Calango			2nd Voted Out; Day 5
Ariadna Arantes; 36, Rio de Janeiro, RJ; Big Brother Brasil 11	Carcará			3rd Voted Out; Day 7
Lucas "Chumbo" Chianca; 25, Saquarema, RJ; Big Brother Brasil 20	Carcará			4th Voted Out; Day 9
Arcrebiano Araújo; 29, Vila Velha, ES; Big Brother Brasil 21	Calango			5th Voted Out; Day 11
Gleiciane "Gleici" Damasceno; 26, Rio Branco, AC; Big Brother Brasil 18	Calango			6th Voted Out; Day 13
Irislene "Íris" Stefanelli; 41, Tupã, SP; Big Brother Brasil 7	Carcará	Calango		7th Voted Out; Day 15
Guilherme Napolitano; 30, Presidente Prudente, SP; Big Brother Brasil 20	Carcará	Carcará		8th Voted Out; Day 17
Kaysar Dadour; 31, Curitiba, PR; Big Brother Brasil 18	Calango	Calango	Jandaia	9th Voted Out; Day 19
Carolina "Carol" Peixinho; 36, Salvador, BA; Big Brother Brasil 19	Calango	Calango	Jandaia	10th Voted Out; Day 21
Jéssica Mueller; 30, Blumenau, SC; Big Brother Brasil 18	Calango	Calango	Jandaia	Eliminated; Day 22
Elana Valenária; 27, Bom Jesus, PI; Big Brother Brasil 19	Carcará	Carcará	Jandaia	Eliminated; Day 22
Marcelo "Zulu" Gomes; 40, Niterói, RJ; Big Brother Brasil 4	Carcará	Carcará	Jandaia	Eliminated; Day 23
André Martinelli; 33, Vitória, ES; Big Brother Brasil 13	Calango	Calango	Jandaia	Eliminated; 2nd Runner-up; Day 23
Viegas de Carvalho; 36, São Paulo, SP; Big Brother Brasil 18	Carcará	Carcará	Jandaia	Runner-Up; Day 23
Paula Amorim; 32, Belo Horizonte, MG; Big Brother Brasil 18	Carcará	Carcará	Jandaia	Sole Survivor; Day 23

== Future appearances ==
After this season, in 2021, Arcrebiano Araújo appeared in A Fazenda 13, where he runner-up the competition.

In 2022, Íris Stefanelli and Gui Napolitano appeared in Bake Off Celebridades 2, Napolitano finished in 15th place and Stefanelli finished in 13th place.

== Season summary ==
Challenge winners and eliminations by episodes
Episode		Challenge winner(s)			Eliminated	Finish
No.	Air date	Reward	Immunity		Eliminated	Finish
1	11 May 2021	Carcará	Carcará		Mahmoud	1st Voted Out; Day 3
1	11 May 2021	Calango	Carcará		Mahmoud	1st Voted Out; Day 3
2	18 May 2021	Carcará	Carcará		Angélica	2nd Voted Out; Day 5
3	25 May 2021	Calango	Calango		Ariadna	3rd Voted Out; Day 7
4	1 June 2021	Carcará	Calango		Chumbo	4th Voted Out; Day 9
5	7 June 2021	Calango	Carcará		Arcrebiano	5th Voted Out; Day 11
6	15 June 2021	Carcará	Carcará		Gleici	6th Voted Out; Day 13
7	22 June 2021	Carcará	Carcará		Íris	7th Voted Out; Day 15
8	29 June 2021	Calango	Calango		Guilherme	8th Voted Out; Day 17
9	6 July 2021	(none)	Zulu	Viegas	Kaysar	9th Voted Out; Day 19
9	6 July 2021	(none)	Carol		Kaysar	9th Voted Out; Day 19
10	13 July 2021	(none)	André		Carol	10th Voted Out; Day 21
10	13 July 2021	(none)	Paula		Carol	10th Voted Out; Day 21
11	20 July 2021	(none)	André; Zulu; Paula; Viegas		Jéssica	Eliminated; Day 22
11	20 July 2021	(none)	André; Zulu; Paula; Viegas		Elana	Eliminated; Day 22
11	20 July 2021	(none)	Viegas; Paula		Zulu	Eliminated; Day 23
11	20 July 2021	(none)	Viegas; Paula		André	Eliminated; Day 23
11	20 July 2021				Jury Vote	
11	20 July 2021				André	Third Place
11	20 July 2021				Public Vote	
11	20 July 2021				Viegas	Runner-Up
11	20 July 2021				Paula	Sole Survivor

== Voting history ==
	Original tribes							Switched tribes		Merged tribe					
Episode	1	2		3	4	5	6	7	8	9	10	11			
Day	3	5		7	9	11	13	15	17	19	21	22		23	
Tribe	Calango	Calango		Carcará	Carcará	Calango	Calango	Calango	Carcará	Jandaia	Jandaia	Jandaia		Jandaia	
Eliminated	Mahmoud	Tie (Note: The vote resulted in a tie. Per the rules, a second vote was held where the castaways involved in the tie would not vote and the remaining castaways could only vote for those who tied.)	Angélica	Ariadna	Chumbo	Arcrebiano	Gleici	Íris	Guilherme	Kaysar	Carol	Jéssica	Elana	Zulu	André
Vote	5-3	3-3-1	3-2	7-1	6-1	5-1	3-2	4-1	3-2	5-2-1	4-3	Challenge		Challenge	
Voter	Votes														
Paula				Ariadna	Chumbo				Guilherme	Kaysar	Carol	Immune		Immune	
Viegas				Ariadna	Chumbo				Guilherme	Kaysar	Carol	Immune		Immune	
André	Mahmoud	Gleici	Gleici			Arcrebiano	Gleici	Íris		Elana	Zulu	Immune		Eliminated	
Zulu				Ariadna	Chumbo				Elana	Kaysar	Carol	Immune		Eliminated	
Elana				Ariadna	Chumbo				Guilherme	Kaysar	Carol	Eliminated			
Jéssica	Mahmoud	Gleici	Gleici			Arcrebiano	Gleici	Íris		Kaysar	Zulu	Eliminated			
Carol	Mahmoud	Angélica	Angélica			Arcrebiano	Gleici	Íris		Paula	Zulu				
Kaysar	André	Angélica	Angélica			Arcrebiano	Jéssica	Íris		Elana					
Guilherme				Ariadna	Chumbo				Elana						
Íris				Ariadna	Chumbo			Kaysar							
Gleici	André	Angélica	None (Note: Angélica and Gleici were not eligible to vote in the second round of voting.)			Arcrebiano	Jéssica								
Arcrebiano	Mahmoud	Jéssica	Angélica			Jéssica									
Chumbo				Ariadna	Íris										
Ariadna				Íris											
Angélica	Mahmoud	Gleici	None												
Mahmoud	André														

Public vote
Finalist	% of vote	Result
Paula	66.77	Sole Survivor
Viegas	33.23	Runner-up

== Ratings and reception ==
=== Brazilian ratings ===
All numbers are in points and provided by Kantar Ibope Media.

Episode	Air date	Timeslot (BRT)	SP viewers (in points)	Source
1	May 11, 2021	Tuesday 10:30 p.m.	21.4	
2	May 18, 2021	Tuesday 10:30 p.m.	18.8	
3	May 25, 2021	Tuesday 10:30 p.m.	18.3	
4	June 1, 2021	Tuesday 10:30 p.m.	16.7	
5	June 7, 2021	Monday 10:30 p.m.	18.2	
6	June 15, 2021	Tuesday 10:30 p.m.	17.6	
7	June 22, 2021	Tuesday 10:30 p.m.	16.6	
8	June 29, 2021	Tuesday 10:30 p.m.	16.6	
9	July 6, 2021	Tuesday 10:30 p.m.	15.9	
10	July 13, 2021	Tuesday 10:30 p.m.	15.9	
11	July 20, 2021	Tuesday 10:30 p.m.	16.3	

No Limite – A Eliminação

Episode	Air date	Timeslot (BRT)	SP viewers (in points)	Source
1	May 16, 2021	Sunday 11:00 p.m.	16.3	
2	May 23, 2021	Sunday 11:00 p.m.	14.4	
3	May 30, 2021	Sunday 11:00 p.m.	13.6	
4	June 6, 2021	Sunday 11:00 p.m.	12.6	
5	June 13, 2021	Sunday 11:00 p.m.	12.6	
6	June 20, 2021	Sunday 11:00 p.m.	11.2	
7	June 27, 2021	Sunday 11:00 p.m.	10.7	
8	July 4, 2021	Sunday 11:00 p.m.	09.6	
9	July 11, 2021	Sunday 11:00 p.m.	10.9	
10	July 18, 2021	Sunday 11:00 p.m.	11.3	

- In 2021, each point represents 268.278 households in 15 market cities in Brazil (76.577 households in São Paulo).
