= Big Brother 18 =

Big Brother 18 is the eighteenth season of various versions of television show Big Brother and may refer to:

- Big Brother 18 (U.S.), the 2016 edition of the U.S. version
- Big Brother 18 (UK), the 2017 edition of the UK version
- Big Brother Brasil 18, the 2018 edition of the Brazilian version
- Bigg Boss (Hindi TV series) season 18, eighteenth season of Big Brother in India in Hindi released in 2024
