= Annete Stone =

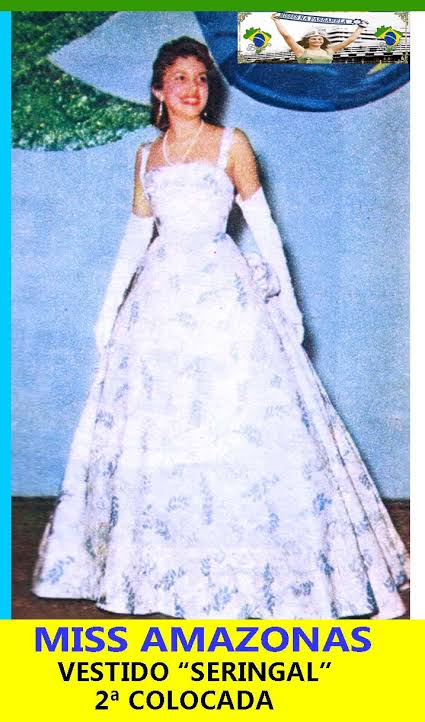
- Anette Stone - Miss Amazonas 1955
- Born: 1937 (age 88–89); Manaus, Amazonas, Brazil
- Occupation: Model
- Spouse: Júlio Cesar Garcia de Souza
- Children: 2
- Modeling information
- Hair color: Brown
- Eye color: Hazel

Annete Stone (born 1937) is a Brazilian former model famous for being placed second in the Miss Brazil 1955 pageant. The victory went to the candidate from Ceará, Maria Emília Corrêa, the second Northeastern to win the traditional national title. In the contest, Annete represented her state of birth, the Amazonas.

== Early life ==
Annete studied in the traditional College Santa Dorotéia, in the center of Manaus. She later married Júlio Cesar Garcia de Souza, one of the founding executives of the Amazon Oil Company (today Isaac Sabbá Refinery). With him she had two daughters, a doctor and another engineer. At the end of the 1970s, she lived in Rio de Janeiro, in the Square Our Lady of Peace, in Ipanema. Today she lives in Maceió, Alagoas.
