= Kaysar Dadour =

Syrian-Brazilian actor (born 1989)

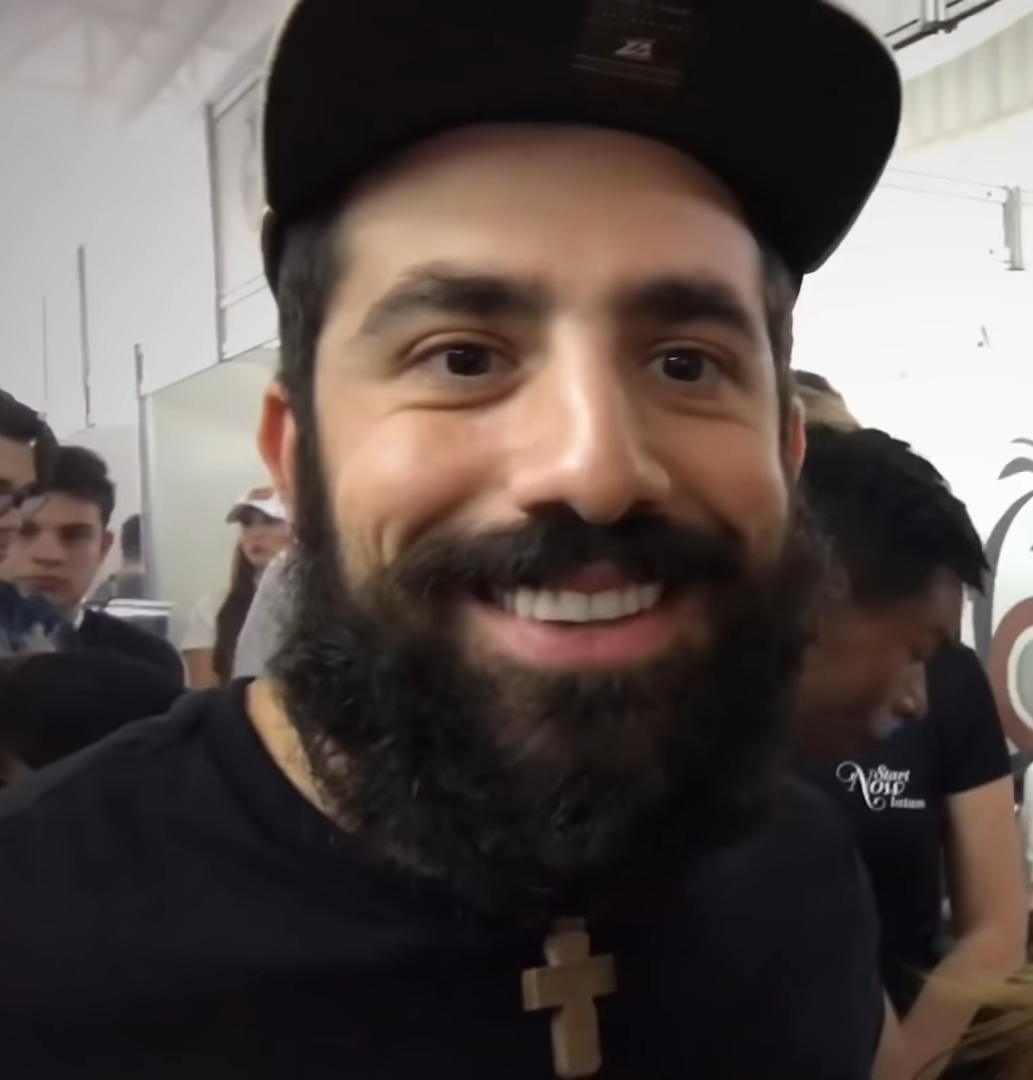
- Dadour in 2019
- Born: 9 July 1989 (age 36); Aleppo, Syria
- Citizenship: Brazilian
- Occupation: Actor
- Years active: 2019–present

Kaysar Dadour (Arabic: قيصر دادور; Portuguese: [kajˈzaʁ daˈduʁ]; born 9 July 1989) is a Syrian-Brazilian actor. He became known after attending the 18th edition of Big Brother Brazil, which he was runner-up. His first prominent role as an actor was playing Fauze in the Brazilian telenovela Órfãos da Terra.

== Early life ==
Dadour was born and raised in Aleppo, Syria. He is the son of Diane and George Dadour and has a younger sister named Celine. In 2011, Kaysar left his homeland, which was in civil war, and fled by car to Lebanon. From Lebanon, he traveled by plane to Ukraine and lived there for a few years. In 2014, he migrated to Curitiba, Brazil, in search of a better life and to bring his family to the country.

== Career ==
In 2018, he joined Big Brother Brasil 18, where he was runner-up with 39.33% of the vote. At the end of September, using the prize received from the program, he managed to fulfill his dream and bring his whole family to Brazil after 7 years apart.

In 2018 made his debut as an actor playing a terrorist in the movie of the Carcereiros series shown on Rede Globo. In 2019, it integrated in the cast of the soap opera Orfãos da Terra playing Fauze. In the plot, he is a Syrian who takes refuge in Brazil as one of the henchmen of Aziz Abdallah (Herson Capri), Extremely loyal to the boss, goes with Sheik to Brazil to capture Laila (Julia Dalavia) and Jamil (Renato Góes).

Despite being in his first TV character, the actor was praised by Web surfers.

== Personal life ==
In June 2019 he applied to obtain Brazilian citizenship. In October 2019 he obtained Brazilian citizenship through naturalization.

== Filmography ==
=== Television ===
| Year | Title | Role | Notes |
|---|---|---|---|
| 2018 | Big Brother Brasil 18 | Housemate | Runner-Up |
| 2019 | Órfãos da Terra | Fauze | |
| 2019 | Dança dos Famosos | Contestant | Winner |
| 2021 | No Limite 5 | Castaway | 8th place |
| 2021 | Carcereiros | Abdel Mussa | |
| 2022 | Cara e Coragem | Kaká Bezerra | |
| 2025 | Guerreiros do Sol | Almir | |

=== Film ===
| Year | Title | Role | Notes |
|---|---|---|---|
| 2019 | Carcereiros: O Filme | Abdel Mussa | Participation |

== Indications and awards ==
| Year | Premium | Category | Result | Ref. |
|---|---|---|---|---|
| 2019 | Melhores do Ano | New Actor | Won | |
| 2019 | Prêmio Contigo! Online | Revelação da TV | Won | |
| 2019 | Prêmio F5 | Revelação da TV | Nominated | |
| 2020 | Premio Area Vip | Revelação da TV | Won | |
