= Nayara de Deus =

Brazilian journalist, TV presenter

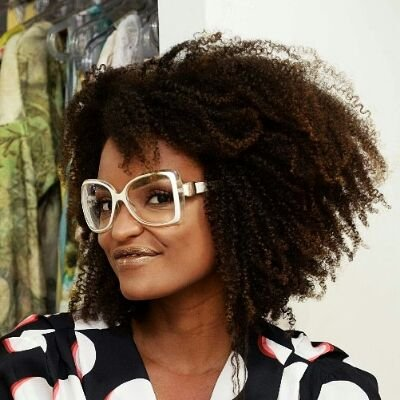
- Nayara de Deus in 2018
- Born: Nayara Helena de Deus; July 25, 1984 (age 42); Santo André, São Paulo, Brazil
- Education: Methodist University of São Paulo
- Occupations: Journalist, TV host, reporter and eventual actress
- Years active: 2007–present
- Organization: Rede Globo
- Notable work: Som & Fúria (2009); Big Brother Brasil 18 (2018)

Nayara Helena de Deus (Santo André, July 25, 1984) is a Brazilian journalist, television presenter, reporter and eventual actress, better known for having participated in the series Som & Fúria and having been one of the competitors of reality eighteenth season of the Brazilian version of the Big Brother, broadcast by Rede Globo in 2018.

== Career ==
Graduated in journalism from Methodist University of São Paulo in 2006, she had a good part of her career focused on textual production. As a reporter, she worked in the Politics and Cities editorials on daily forms. With corporate communications, she wrote to Avon and Citibank employees. However, she never hid her aims by writing stories for the housing movement, among other areas of public interest.

In 2009, she realized participations in the TV series Som & Fúria on Rede Globo, sharing credits with Andréa Beltrão, Dan Stulbach and Daniel de Oliveira.

She was one of the competitors from eighteenth season of the Brazilian version of the Big Brother, broadcast by Rede Globo in 2018, considered strong in the reality show, authentic and marked by its positions on social themes and representativity.

At dawn on May 1, 2018, she was responsible for the real-time coverage, via Instagram, of the fire at the Edifício Wilton Paes de Almeida, a major disaster that occurred in the region of Largo do Paissandu, in the center of São Paulo. Work that gained prominence in the media and had the accompaniment of all the great press, that only arrived at the place 4 hours after the first information yielded by the journalist. Well-known portals such as Folha de São Paulo, O Globo and Bild of Germany, released their first online notes on the fateful night through interviews and images collected by the action of the communicator.

Since July 25, 2018, she has presented the program Apurando com Nay de Deus, screened by YouTube where she talks about accessible and sustainable fashion, among social and lifestyle guidelines.

She participated in the "Apocalipse em Caruaru" interpreting Gypsy, in the same year, she had a brief passage as a current affairs reporter in the program TV Fama of the São Paulo television station Rede TV!.

== Personal life ==
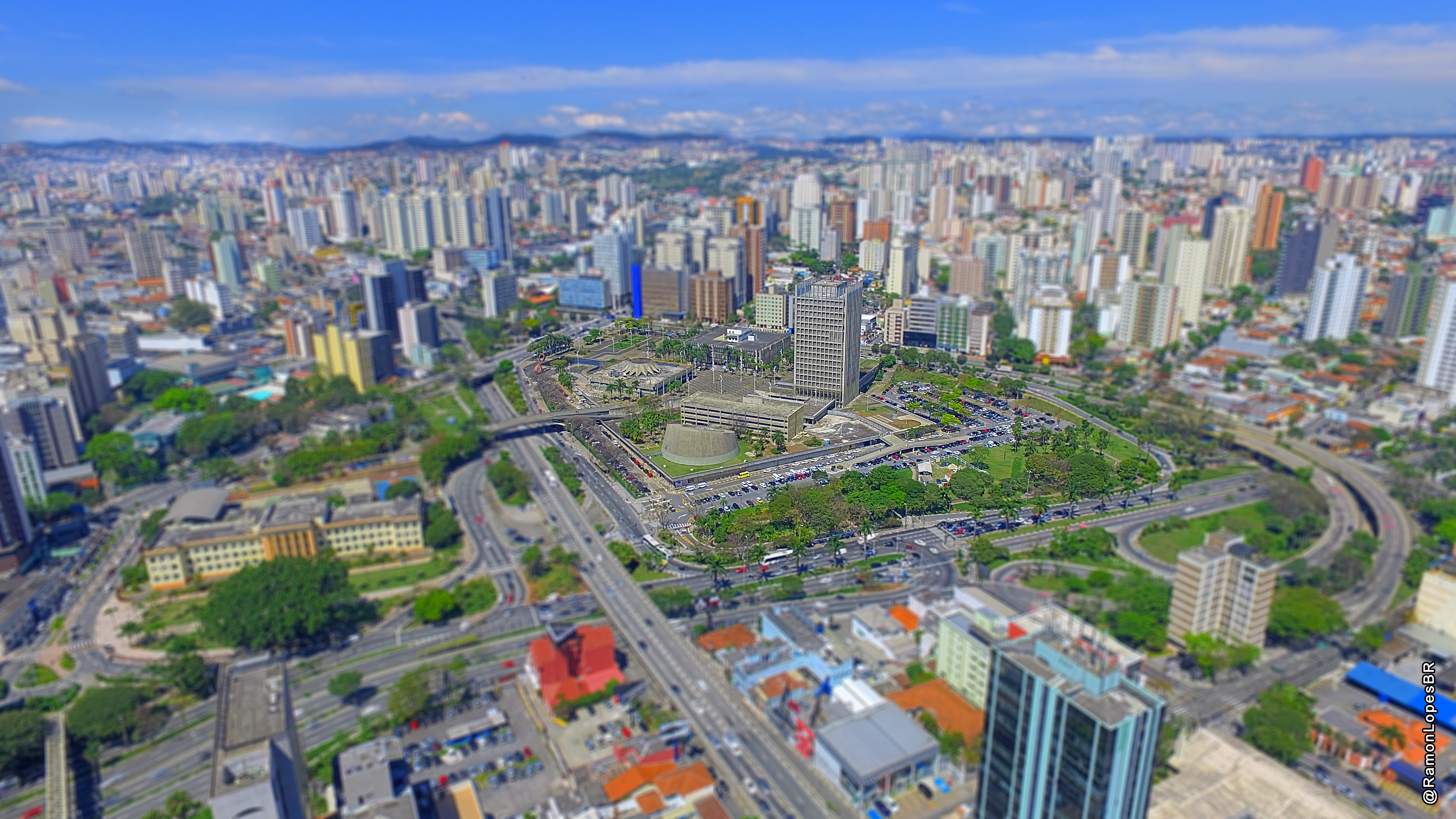
Santo André, Hometown of Nayara.

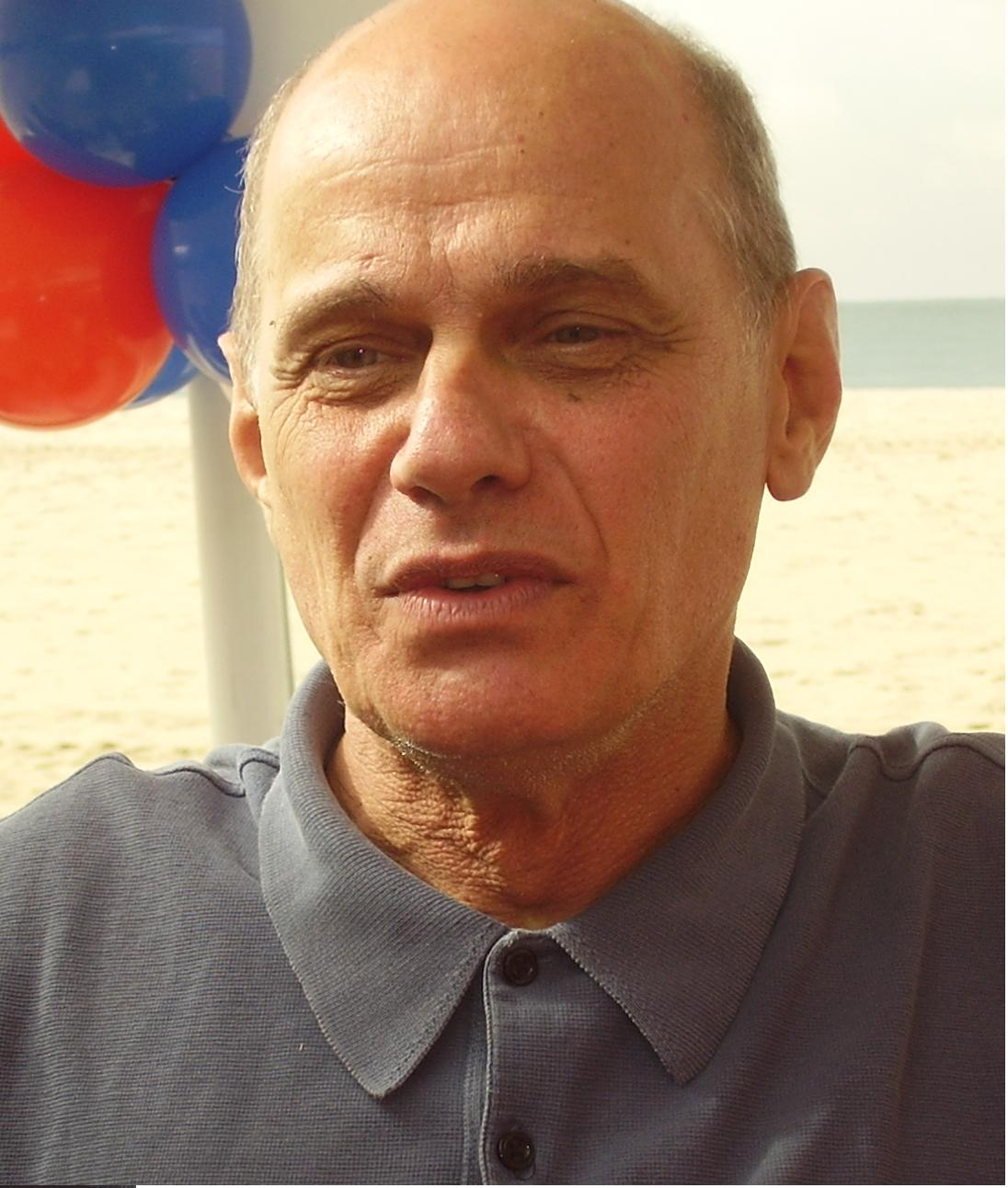
Ricardo Boechat, was one of the main influences for Nayara.

Born in Santo André, in the state of São Paulo, she is the daughter of Lúcia Helena de Deus, a Portuguese-language teacher and literature. Her father is an engineer. She has always enjoyed classical music, jazz, was trained in piano and during her childhood and adolescence had a very rigid education, studied in private colleges and was very dedicated to studies.

At the age of 19, she left home in Santo André to realize her dreams in the big city. After arriving in a hospital in São Paulo around 6:00 pm on December 12, 2018, Wednesday, she reported the following 14 hours on the web while waiting for a room - already reserved - for the hospitalization of her mother Lúcia Helena, who after five days of hospitalization died from lung cancer at 68 years of age.

== Philanthropy ==
She gave solidarity to the victims and residents of the Edifício Wilton Paes de Almeida that collapsed on May 1, 2018. During the day and dawn she collected donations, supported and talked with the homeless. About 370 people occupied the building and have nowhere to live.

== Filmography ==
=== Television ===
Year	Title	Role
2009	Som & Fúria	Various Characters
2018	Big Brother Brasil	Contestant
2018	TV Fama	Eventual Reporter

=== Internet ===
Year	Title	Role
2018–present	Apurando com Nay de Deus	Presenter and Journalist

== Theater ==
Year	Title	Role
2018	Apocalipse em Caruaru	Gipsy
