= Big Brother Brasil 19 =

- Season 19
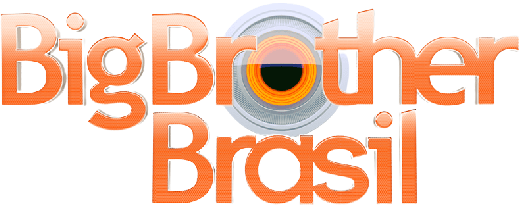
- Hosted by: Tiago Leifert
- No. of days: 88
- No. of housemates: 17
- Winner: Paula von Sperling
- Runner-up: Alan Possamai
- Companion shows: Rede BBB; A Eliminação
- No. of episodes: 88

Release
- Original network: Globo
- Original release: January 15 – April 12, 2019

Season chronology
- ← Previous; Big Brother Brasil 18 Next → Big Brother Brasil 20

Big Brother Brasil 19 was the nineteenth season of Big Brother Brasil which premiered on January 15, 2019, on the Rede Globo. The show is produced by Endemol Shine and presented by Tiago Leifert.

The grand prize is R$1.5 million with tax allowances, plus a R$150,000 prize offered to the runner-up and a R$50,000 prize offered to the housemate in third place.

On April 12, 2019, 28 year-old bachelor in law Paula von Sperling from Lagoa Santa, Minas Gerais won the competition with 61.09% of the public vote over administrator & entrepreneur Alan Possamai.

A worldwide record breaking number of 202.406.432 million votes were cast on week 10's eviction besides being the fifth lowest-rated season ever to date.

== The game ==
=== Super Nomination ===
In a twist called "Super Nomination", there was no Head of Household and Power of Immunity competitions, as well the housemates' vote to nominate during the first week.

Instead, three housemates won immunity through two competitions (Danrley and Gustavo won the first on day 1, while Paula won the second on day 3) while the remaining fourteen were automatically nominated. Vinicius, as the housemate who received the fewest public votes to save was evicted on day 8.

=== Room of the Seven Challenges ===
On Day 6, the housemates were asked to go to the Diary Room and vote for who they wanted out of the game. The three housemates with the most votes would be moved to the "Room of the Seven Challenges". If they completed the challenges presented to them, they would be allowed to veto three housemates from competing in the first HoH competition. However, if they fail, they would be vetoed from the competition instead.

Voter	Vote
Alan	Hariany
Carolina	Hana
Danrley	Diego
Diego	Hana
Elana	Isabella
Gabriela	Paula
Gustavo	Hana
Hana	Tereza
Hariany	Tereza
Isabella	Elana
Maycon	Paula
Paula	Vanderson
Rízia	Hariany
Rodrigo	Hariany
Tereza	Hariany
Vanderson	Paula
Vinicius	Hana
Sent to the Room	Hana; Hariany; Paula
Result	7 out of 7 challenges completed

=== Fake Eviction ===
Week 7 was a fake eviction week. Unbeknownst to the housemates, Brazil was voting to give immunity for week 8's eviction to one of the nominees. Gabriela was voted to be immune. After walking through the eviction door, Gabriela was secretly taken to the house pantry to surprise her housemates.

=== Quadruple Nomination & House Eviction Vote ===
Week 8 was a "Quadruple Nomination" week where four housemates were nominated - one by the Head of Household, two from the House's nomination vote and one by the Big Phone. While there was no Power of Immunity, three housemates were awarded immunity - Gabriela as voted by Brazil to be immune in the fake eviction, Paula as the Head of Household during the fake eviction, and Rízia as week 8's Head of Household.

The Brazilian public voted to save two of the nominee with the other two nominees facing a house eviction vote. In the event of a tied eviction vote, the nominee with the lowest vote total from the public vote was evicted. Tereza and Hariany were the housemates who received the fewest public votes to save and Tereza was evicted by a house vote of 5–3.

=== Big Boss ===
The Big Boss was introduced during week 2 as an added interactive feature. During Thursday's live show, the public may vote to select between two options which may or may not influence directly in the game.

Week	Question	Options	Vote	Affected
2	"Which housemate should lose 500 estalecas?"	The first to take a shower in any bathroom	48.05%	Gustavo
2	"Which housemate should lose 500 estalecas?"	The first to sit on the suspended swing	51.95%	Gustavo
3	"Should the housemates compete for Have/Have-Nots?"	Yes	74.26%	Alan, Danrley, Elana, Gabriela, Hana, Rízia, Rodrigo
3	"Should the housemates compete for Have/Have-Nots?"	No	25.74%	Alan, Danrley, Elana, Gabriela, Hana, Rízia, Rodrigo
4	"Should the housemates lose access to the gym?"	Yes	84.93%	All housemates
4	"Should the housemates lose access to the gym?"	No	15.07%	All housemates
5	"Should the live nominations done face to face?"	Yes	74.24%	All housemates
5	"Should the live nominations done face to face?"	No	25.76%	All housemates
6	"Should the housemates be chained in 2 teams for 4 days?"	Yes	79.10%	All housemates
6	"Should the housemates be chained in 2 teams for 4 days?"	No	20.90%	All housemates
9	"How should the third nominee be determined?"	Big Phone	37.83%	Carolina, Danrley
9	"How should the third nominee be determined?"	The two most voted by the housemates	62.17%	Carolina, Danrley

=== Power of No ===
Week	Previous HoH(s)	Total vetoed	Vetoed housemates
1	Immunity Challenge	2	Danrley, Gustavo
2	Hana, Hariany, Paula	3	Carolina, Rodrigo, Tereza
4	Carolina	1	Alan
6	Isabella^{8}	1	Alan^{8}
6	Danrley, Elana	3	Carolina, Isabella, Paula
9	Rízia	1	Rodrigo
10	Gabriela	1	Paula
11	Alan	1	Hariany

== Housemates ==
The cast list with 18 housemates was unveiled on January 9, 2019. On January 12, Fábio Alano, a 27-year-old P.E. teacher & MMA athlete from Porto Alegre, was kicked off of the show during the sequester period, after it was revealed he had a sponsorship contract with a fitness clothing brand and did not told the producers. After his removal from the game, no replacement was designated, bringing the number of housemates down to 17.
(ages stated at time of contest)

Name	Age	Hometown	Occupation	Day entered	Day exited	Result
Paula von Sperling	28	Lagoa Santa	Bachelor in Law	1	88	Winner
Alan Possamai	26	Criciúma	Administrator & entrepreneur	1	88	Runner-up
Carolina Peixinho	33	Salvador	Businesswoman & advertising	1	87	13th Evicted
Hariany Almeida	21	Senador Canedo	Fashion design student	1	87	2nd Ejected
Rízia Cerqueira	24	São Miguel dos Campos	Journalist	1	85	12th Evicted
Gabriela Hebling	32	Ribeirão Preto	Graphic designer & percussionist	1	83	11th Evicted
Rodrigo França	40	Rio de Janeiro	Human rights social scientist & dramaturgist	1	78	10th Evicted
Elana Valenária	25	Bom Jesus	Agronomic engineer	1	71	9th Evicted
Danrley Ferreira	19	Rio de Janeiro	Biology student & popsicle seller	1	64	8th Evicted
Tereza Souza	52	Arcoverde	Psychoanalyst & licensed practical nurse	1	57	7th Evicted
Isabella Cecchi	24	Natal	Medical student	1	43	6th Evicted
Maycon Santos	27	Piumhi	Barman & cheese seller	1	36	5th Evicted
Diego Wantowsky	30	Rio Negrinho	Businessman & horse breeder	1	29	4th Evicted
Hana Khalil	22	Rio de Janeiro	Bachelor in Cinema & YouTuber	1	22	3rd Evicted
Gustavo Soares	37	São Paulo	Ophthalmologist	1	15	2nd Evicted
Vanderson Brito	35	Rio Branco	Biologist & indigenous social educator	1	9	1st Ejected
Vinicius Póvoa	40	Belo Horizonte	Plastic artist & advertising	1	8	1st Evicted
Guest
Name	Age	Hometown	Occupation	Day entered	Day exited	Grande Fratello
Alberto Mezzetti	34	Viterbo, Italy	Business owner	60	66	Winner

== Future appearances ==
After this season, in 2019, Hariany Almeida appeared in A Fazenda 11, she finished the season as Runner-Up.

After this season, in 2019, Hana Khalil appeared on De Férias com o Ex Brasil: Celebs as original cast member.

In 2020, Isabella Cecchi appeared on Big Brother Brasil 20 as a model in an activity.

In 2021, Carolina Peixinho and Elana Valenária appeared in No Limite 5. Carolina finished in 7th place, while Elana finished in 5th place.

== Voting history ==
Key
– Chained from the Red team
– Chained from the White team

	Week 1	Week 2	Week 3	Week 4	Week 5	Week 6	Week 7	Week 8		Week 9	Week 10	Week 11	Week 12		Week 13	
	Week 1	Week 2	Week 3	Week 4	Week 5	Week 6	Week 7	Nomination	Eviction	Week 9	Week 10	Week 11	Day 82	Day 83	Day 85	Finale
Head of Household	(none)	Hana	Carolina	Danrley; Elana	Danrley; Elana	Elana	Paula	Rízia		Gabriela	Alan	Paula	Paula	Alan	Alan	(none)
Power of Immunity	(none)	Alan; Rodrigo	Maycon; Tereza	Paula	Carolina	Isabella	Rodrigo	(none)	(none)	Rízia	Gabriela	Rízia	(none)			(none)
Saved	(none)	Gabriela	Diego	Hariany	Isabella	Carolina	Danrley	(none)	(none)	Rodrigo	Rodrigo	Rízia	(none)			(none)
Nomination (Twists)	(none)	Hariany	Hariany	(none)		Alan	Rodrigo	Carolina	(none)	(none)	Paula	Carolina	(none)			(none)
Nomination (HoH)	(none)	Gustavo	Hana	Diego; Isabella	Maycon	Isabella	Gabriela	Tereza	(none)	Paula	Elana	Rodrigo	Gabriela	Paula	Paula	(none)
Nomination (Housemates)	(none)	Paula	Rízia	Alan	Rodrigo; Tereza	Tereza	Tereza	Alan; Hariany	(none)	Carolina; Danrley	Carolina	Hariany	Rízia	Rízia	Carolina	(none)
Paula	Exempt	Rodrigo	Alan	Alan	Rodrigo	Tereza	Tereza	Rodrigo	Tereza	Danrley	Gabriela	Head of Household	Rízia	Rízia	Carolina	Winner (Day 88)
Alan	Nominated	Paula	Tereza	Carolina	Carolina	Rízia	Carolina	Hariany	Tereza	Elana	Head of Household	Hariany	Hariany	Head of Household	Head of Household	Runner-up (Day 88)
Carolina	Nominated	Paula	Head of Household	Alan	Alan	Danrley	Tereza	Danrley	Tereza	Danrley	Rízia	Gabriela	Rízia	Rízia	Not eligible	Evicted (Day 87)
Hariany	Nominated	Rodrigo	Alan	Alan	Rodrigo	Tereza	Tereza	Rodrigo	Nominated	Danrley	Gabriela	Alan	Rízia	Rízia	Not eligible	Ejected (Day 87)
Rízia	Nominated	Paula	Maycon	Tereza	Tereza	Tereza	Tereza	Alan	Tereza	Carolina	Carolina	Hariany	Carolina	Carolina	Evicted (Day 85)	
Gabriela	Nominated	Paula	Maycon	Maycon	Tereza	Tereza	Tereza	Hariany	Tereza	Head of Household	Carolina	Hariany	Hariany	Evicted (Day 83)		
Rodrigo	Nominated	Paula	Maycon	Maycon	Paula	Hariany	Carolina	Hariany	Hariany	Carolina	Carolina	Hariany	Evicted (Day 78)			
Elana	Nominated	Isabella	Isabella	Co-head of Household	Co-head of Household	Head of Household	Carolina	Alan	Hariany	Carolina	Carolina	Evicted (Day 71)				
Danrley	Exempt	Diego	Isabella	Co-head of Household	Co-head of Household	Paula	Carolina	Hariany	Hariany	Carolina	Evicted (Day 64)					
Tereza	Nominated	Hariany	Rízia	Rízia	Rízia	Paula	Hariany	Alan	Nominated	Evicted (Day 57)						
Isabella	Nominated	Elana	Rízia	Elana	Danrley	Danrley	Evicted (Day 43)									
Maycon	Nominated	Hariany	Rízia	Rodrigo	Rodrigo	Evicted (Day 36)										
Diego	Nominated	Rodrigo	Rízia	Rodrigo	Evicted (Day 29)											
Hana	Nominated	Head of Household	Tereza	Evicted (Day 22)												
Gustavo	Exempt	Rodrigo	Evicted (Day 15)													
Vanderson	Nominated	Ejected (Day 9)														
Vinicius	Nominated	Evicted (Day 8)														
Notes	1	2, 3	4	5	6, 7	8, 9	10, 11, 12	10, 13, 14, 15		16	17	18, 19	20, 21, 22	(none)	23, 24	25
Nominated for Eviction	Alan; Carolina; Diego; Elana; Gabriela; Hana; Hariany; Isabella; Maycon; Rízia; Rodrigo; Tereza; Vanderson; Vinicius	Gustavo; Hariany; Paula	Hana; Hariany; Rízia	Alan; Diego; Isabella	Maycon; Rodrigo; Tereza	Alan; Isabella; Tereza	Gabriela; Rodrigo; Tereza	Alan; Carolina; Hariany; Tereza	Hariany; Tereza	Carolina; Danrley; Paula	Carolina; Elana; Paula	Carolina; Hariany; Rodrigo	Gabriela; Rízia	Paula; Rízia	Carolina; Paula	Alan; Paula
Ejected	(none)	Vanderson	(none)												Hariany	(none)
Evicted	Vinicius; 3.73% to save	Gustavo; 79% to evict	Hana; 47.98% to evict	Diego; 52% to evict	Maycon; 56% to evict	Isabella; 64% to evict	Gabriela; 51% to save	Tereza; 6% to save	Tereza; 5 of 8 votes to evict	Danrley; 61% to evict	Elana; 51% to evict	Rodrigo; 70% to evict	Gabriela; 61% to evict	Rízia; 62% to evict	Carolina; 55% to evict	Alan; 39% to win
Evicted	Vinicius; 3.73% to save	Gustavo; 79% to evict	Hana; 47.98% to evict	Diego; 52% to evict	Maycon; 56% to evict	Isabella; 64% to evict	Gabriela; 51% to save	Hariany; 28% to save	Tereza; 5 of 8 votes to evict	Danrley; 61% to evict	Elana; 51% to evict	Rodrigo; 70% to evict	Gabriela; 61% to evict	Rízia; 62% to evict	Carolina; 55% to evict	Alan; 39% to win
Survived	Vanderson; 3.84% to save	Paula; 14% to evict	Hariany; 47.50% to evict	Alan; 43% to evict	Rodrigo; 42% to evict	Alan; 24% to evict	Tereza; 27% to save	Alan; 29% to save	Hariany; 3 of 8 votes to evict	Paula; 24% to evict	Carolina; 45% to evict	Carolina; 28% to evict	Rízia; 39% to evict	Paula; 38% to evict	Paula; 45% to evict	Paula; 61% to win
Survived	Tereza; 3.89% to save	Paula; 14% to evict	Hariany; 47.50% to evict	Alan; 43% to evict	Rodrigo; 42% to evict	Alan; 24% to evict	Tereza; 27% to save	Alan; 29% to save	Hariany; 3 of 8 votes to evict	Paula; 24% to evict	Carolina; 45% to evict	Carolina; 28% to evict	Rízia; 39% to evict	Paula; 38% to evict	Paula; 45% to evict	Paula; 61% to win
Survived	Maycon; 5.15% to save	Paula; 14% to evict	Hariany; 47.50% to evict	Alan; 43% to evict	Rodrigo; 42% to evict	Alan; 24% to evict	Tereza; 27% to save	Alan; 29% to save	Hariany; 3 of 8 votes to evict	Paula; 24% to evict	Carolina; 45% to evict	Carolina; 28% to evict	Rízia; 39% to evict	Paula; 38% to evict	Paula; 45% to evict	Paula; 61% to win
Survived	Carolina; 5.69% to save	Paula; 14% to evict	Hariany; 47.50% to evict	Alan; 43% to evict	Rodrigo; 42% to evict	Alan; 24% to evict	Tereza; 27% to save	Alan; 29% to save	Hariany; 3 of 8 votes to evict	Paula; 24% to evict	Carolina; 45% to evict	Carolina; 28% to evict	Rízia; 39% to evict	Paula; 38% to evict	Paula; 45% to evict	Paula; 61% to win
Survived	Diego; 6.10% to save	Paula; 14% to evict	Hariany; 47.50% to evict	Alan; 43% to evict	Rodrigo; 42% to evict	Alan; 24% to evict	Tereza; 27% to save	Alan; 29% to save	Hariany; 3 of 8 votes to evict	Paula; 24% to evict	Carolina; 45% to evict	Carolina; 28% to evict	Rízia; 39% to evict	Paula; 38% to evict	Paula; 45% to evict	Paula; 61% to win
Survived	Hariany; 6.87% to save	Paula; 14% to evict	Hariany; 47.50% to evict	Alan; 43% to evict	Rodrigo; 42% to evict	Alan; 24% to evict	Tereza; 27% to save	Alan; 29% to save	Hariany; 3 of 8 votes to evict	Paula; 24% to evict	Carolina; 45% to evict	Carolina; 28% to evict	Rízia; 39% to evict	Paula; 38% to evict	Paula; 45% to evict	Paula; 61% to win
Survived	Isabella; 7.36% to save	Paula; 14% to evict	Hariany; 47.50% to evict	Alan; 43% to evict	Rodrigo; 42% to evict	Alan; 24% to evict	Tereza; 27% to save	Alan; 29% to save	Hariany; 3 of 8 votes to evict	Paula; 24% to evict	Carolina; 45% to evict	Carolina; 28% to evict	Rízia; 39% to evict	Paula; 38% to evict	Paula; 45% to evict	Paula; 61% to win
Survived	Isabella; 7.36% to save	Hariany; 7% to evict	Rízia; 5% to evict	Isabella; 5% to evict	Tereza; 2% to evict	Tereza; 12% to evict	Rodrigo; 22% to save	Carolina; 37% to save	Hariany; 3 of 8 votes to evict	Carolina; 15% to evict	Paula; 4% to evict	Hariany; 2% to evict	Rízia; 39% to evict	Paula; 38% to evict	Paula; 45% to evict	Paula; 61% to win
Survived	Alan; 8.32% to save	Hariany; 7% to evict	Rízia; 5% to evict	Isabella; 5% to evict	Tereza; 2% to evict	Tereza; 12% to evict	Rodrigo; 22% to save	Carolina; 37% to save	Hariany; 3 of 8 votes to evict	Carolina; 15% to evict	Paula; 4% to evict	Hariany; 2% to evict	Rízia; 39% to evict	Paula; 38% to evict	Paula; 45% to evict	Paula; 61% to win
Survived	Hana; 8.47% to save	Hariany; 7% to evict	Rízia; 5% to evict	Isabella; 5% to evict	Tereza; 2% to evict	Tereza; 12% to evict	Rodrigo; 22% to save	Carolina; 37% to save	Hariany; 3 of 8 votes to evict	Carolina; 15% to evict	Paula; 4% to evict	Hariany; 2% to evict	Rízia; 39% to evict	Paula; 38% to evict	Paula; 45% to evict	Paula; 61% to win
Survived	Rízia; 8.66% to save	Hariany; 7% to evict	Rízia; 5% to evict	Isabella; 5% to evict	Tereza; 2% to evict	Tereza; 12% to evict	Rodrigo; 22% to save	Carolina; 37% to save	Hariany; 3 of 8 votes to evict	Carolina; 15% to evict	Paula; 4% to evict	Hariany; 2% to evict	Rízia; 39% to evict	Paula; 38% to evict	Paula; 45% to evict	Paula; 61% to win
Survived	Gabriela; 9.20% to save	Hariany; 7% to evict	Rízia; 5% to evict	Isabella; 5% to evict	Tereza; 2% to evict	Tereza; 12% to evict	Rodrigo; 22% to save	Carolina; 37% to save	Hariany; 3 of 8 votes to evict	Carolina; 15% to evict	Paula; 4% to evict	Hariany; 2% to evict	Rízia; 39% to evict	Paula; 38% to evict	Paula; 45% to evict	Paula; 61% to win
Survived	Rodrigo; 11.19% to save	Hariany; 7% to evict	Rízia; 5% to evict	Isabella; 5% to evict	Tereza; 2% to evict	Tereza; 12% to evict	Rodrigo; 22% to save	Carolina; 37% to save	Hariany; 3 of 8 votes to evict	Carolina; 15% to evict	Paula; 4% to evict	Hariany; 2% to evict	Rízia; 39% to evict	Paula; 38% to evict	Paula; 45% to evict	Paula; 61% to win
Survived	Elana; 11.53% to save	Hariany; 7% to evict	Rízia; 5% to evict	Isabella; 5% to evict	Tereza; 2% to evict	Tereza; 12% to evict	Rodrigo; 22% to save	Carolina; 37% to save	Hariany; 3 of 8 votes to evict	Carolina; 15% to evict	Paula; 4% to evict	Hariany; 2% to evict	Rízia; 39% to evict	Paula; 38% to evict	Paula; 45% to evict	Paula; 61% to win

=== Notes ===
- ^Note 1: On Day 1, the housemates competed in pairs (formed by a random draw) in a special challenge. Rodrigo & Vinicius were the first pair to complete the challenge, but were subsequently disqualified for breaking the rules. As result, the immunity was awarded to the pair that came in second place: Danrley & Gustavo. On Day 2, all housemates (except Danrley & Gustavo) competed in an endurance challenge for the third and final immunity of the week. Paula won the challenge, saving herself from the "Super Nomination". Alan, Carolina, Diego, Elana, Gabriela, Hana, Hariany, Isabella, Maycon, Rízia, Rodrigo, Tereza, Vanderson and Vinicius were automatically nominated for eviction by default.
- ^Note 2: Vanderson was ejected from the house on day 9 to testify about the physical assault allegations made against him outside of the house.
- ^Note 3: After nominations, Maycon answered the Big Phone and was tasked with nominating a third housemate for eviction. He nominated Hariany.
- ^Note 4: Unbeknownst to the housemates, the first person eliminated from week 3's HoH competition would win the power to instantly nominate a housemate for eviction. Alan was the first to leave and nominated Hariany.
- ^Note 5: Week 4's HoH competition was contested in pairs. The winning pair was Danrley & Elana. In addition to being Co-HoH, the pair had to allocate amongst themselves a cash prize of 10,000 reais (chosen by Elana) and immunity from the house's vote (chosen by Danrley). Additionally, the Co-HoHs nominated two housemates for eviction.
- ^Note 6: Week 5's HoH competition was contested in pairs. The winning pair was Danrley & Elana. In addition to being Co-HoH, the pair had to allocate amongst themselves a cash prize of 10,000 reais (chosen by Danrley) and immunity from the house's vote (chosen by Elana).
- ^Note 7: Due to week 5's "Big Boss" vote, the housemates nominated in a face-to-face round of voting. In addition, the two highest vote receivers would be nominated alongside the HoH's nominee.
- ^Note 8: Isabella answered the Big Phone and was given a dilemma - nominate someone from she is chained with (Alan, Gabriela, Rizia or Rodrigo) and become unchained or nominate herself and remained chained. She nominated Alan and her group was freed.
- ^Note 9: For week 6's nominations, the housemates voted in a face-to-face round of voting.
- ^Note 10: It was revealed to the viewers that week 7 would be a fake eviction week. The housemates were unaware that the Brazilian public will be voting for one of the nominees to be immune from week 8's eviction. Gabriela received the most public votes to save and won immunity. Paula, as the Head of Household during the fake eviction, would also be immune from week 8's eviction.
- ^Note 11: Before week 7's nominations, the housemates participated in a random draw. The housemate drawn would win the power to directly nominate, but only someone sitting next to them during nominations. Tereza was drawn and to nominate either Rodrigo or Danrley. She nominated Rodrigo.
- ^Note 12: As Head of Household, Paula was forced to break the tie between Carolina and Tereza (with four votes each). She nominated Tereza.
- ^Note 13: During Week 8, four housemates were nominated for eviction - one by the Head of Household, two from the House's vote and one by the Big Phone (see note 14). The Brazilian public will then vote to save and the two housemates with the fewest votes will face a house eviction vote. In the event of a tied eviction vote, the nominee with the lowest vote total from the public vote will be evicted. Due to the twist, no Power of Immunity competition would be held.
- ^Note 14: Danrley answered the Big Phone as was tasked with putting bracelets on two housemates - he chose Carolina and Tereza. During nominations, Danrley had to directly nominate Carolina or Tereza - he nominated Carolina.
- ^Note 15: Hariany received the most nominations with 4 votes. Alan and Rodrigo were tied for the second most nominations with two votes each. As Head of Household, Rízia was forced to break the tie and nominated Alan.
- ^Note 16: Due to week 9's "Big Boss" vote, two housemates with most votes would be nominated alongside the HoH's nominee.
- ^Note 17: The first four housemates eliminated from week 10's HoH competition would each took a 'bottle of consequences'. The consequences were as follows:
  - Rodrigo won the power to nominate a housemate for eviction on Sunday. He nominated Paula
  - Gabriela won the Immunity Veto - giving her the power to void the Power of Immunity holder's decision. As Gabriela won the PoI, the power was not used
  - Rízia won the power to not allow a housemate from competing for the Power of Immunity. She chose Carolina
  - Hariany was tasked to choose a housemate to become a 'Have-Not'. She chose Rodrigo.
- ^Note 18: Week 11 featured the final the Power of Immunity of the season. In a twist, as the PoI winner, Rízia herself won immunity, rather than be forced to award immunity to another housemate. While viewers were informed of this twist early, the housemates were only informed about the twist during nominations.
- ^Note 19: On week 11, the Head of Household's nominee would have the power to name a third nominee. HoH Paula nominated Rodrigo, who in turn nominated Carolina.
- ^Note 20: From this point forward, all nominations would be made in face-to-face voting.
- ^Note 21: Week 12's first round of nominations was originally scheduled to take place on day 81, however, due to the HoH endurance competition overrun the Friday's live show, it was postponed to Day 82.
- ^Note 22: As Head of Household, Paula was forced to break the tie between Hariany and Rízia (with two votes each). She nominated Rízia.
- ^Note 23: Alan won the Final HoH, winning his place in the finale. He nominated Paula. Carolina and Hariany did not vote as they could only vote for each other and their votes would cancel the other's out. As Paula's vote would be the only valid vote cast, Paula had the power to name the second nominee between Carolina and Hariany. She nominated Carolina, making Hariany the second finalist. Carolina and Paula faced each other in the final eviction vote to determine the third finalist.
- ^Note 24: Already a finalist, Hariany was ejected on day 87 due to violent behaviour towards Paula. The final eviction between Carolina and Paula still took place and only two housemates faced the final vote.
- ^Note 25: For the finale, the Brazilian public voted for the finalist they wanted to win Big Brother Brasil 19.

=== Have and Have-Nots ===
This season, each housemate receives a weekly sum of Estalecas (the house currency) to make the purchases in the Big Brother Brasil market. The items purchased are for the consumption of whole house, but a housemate can save them for their own consumption. A panel in the kitchen updates individual balances and the total house money. If there is an individual or collective punishment, the values are reduced; and if the loss is too big, all housemates (including the Head of Household) become Have-Nots for the week. In the panel is also possible to check the control of water consumption so both public and housemates can follow. Upon reaching the indicated limit, the house is punished with the water suspension.

	Week 1	Week 2	Week 3		Week 4		Week 5	Week 6		Week 7^{4}	Week 8	Week 9	Week 10^{5}	Week 11		Week 12	Week 13
	Week 1	Week 2	Day 17	Day 20^{1}	Day 24	Day 27^{2}	Week 5	Day 37	Day 40^{3}	Week 7^{4}	Week 8	Week 9	Week 10^{5}	Day 73	Day 77^{6}	Week 12	Week 13
House status	Have	Have	Have	Have	Have	Have-not	Have	Have	Have-not	Have	Have	Have	Have	Have	Have-not	Have	Have
House status	Have	Have	Have	Have-not	Have	Have-not	Have	Have	Have-not	Alan	Have	Have	Rodrigo	Have	Have-not	Have	Have

- ^Note 1: Due to week 3's "Big Boss" vote, special have and have-nots competition where the team of Alan, Danrley, Elana, Gabriela, Hana, Rízia and Rodrigo lost and become 'have-nots' for the rest of the week.
- ^Note 2: After two punishments received by Hariany and Diego, the housemates went below the minimum of estalecas needed to be 'haves', so all house become 'have-nots' until the end of the week.
- ^Note 3: The housemates were punished for exhausting the water supply, thus being below the minimum of estalecas needed to be 'haves', so all house become 'have-nots' until the end of the week.
- ^Note 4: After being eliminated from week 7's HoH endurance competition, Rodrigo took a 'bottle of consequences' and was given a dilemma - become a 'Have-Not' or chose another Housemate to be a 'Have-Not'. He chose Alan.
- ^Note 5: After being eliminated from week 10's HoH competition, Hariany took a 'bottle of consequences' and had to choose a housemate to become a 'Have-Not'. She choose Rodrigo.
- ^Note 6: After two punishments received by Carolina and Paula, the housemates went below the minimum of estalecas needed to be 'haves', so all house become 'have-nots' until the end of the week.

== Controversy ==
The nineteenth season became highly controversial after a variety of racist, homophobic and misogynistic remarks were made by several of the housemates (including Diego Wantowsky, Gustavo Soares, Hariany Almeida, Maycon Santos and winner Paula von Sperling) on the live feeds but not aired on primetime episodes and alleged rigging from production and host Tiago Leifert fixing the game for certain players.

=== Maycon ===
Maycon Santos became controversial on social media after casually telling a story about committing an act of animal cruelty, when he strapped firecrackers into a cat's tail and put tape on the animal so that it would walk in circles. The naturalness with which Maycon spoke about the act infuriated viewers and celebrities such as Tatá Werneck. Activist Luísa Mell even encouraged her followers to evict him from the house.

During a Saturday party, after watching Rodrigo França and Gabriela Hebling dance to the song "Identidade" by Jorge Aragão (a samba that exalts blackness), Maycon told Diego Wantowsky that he had felt a shiver when he heard that "weird music" and that "several voices were talking to me saying 'do not be like them'". The next day, he even insinuated that Gabriela had made a macumba (Afro-Brazilian-witchcraft) for Isabella Cecchi to become ill. Due these statements, Maycon was labeled by viewers as racist and accused of religious intolerance.

=== Paula ===
Paula von Sperling, in a conversation with Elana Valenária and Gabriela Hebling, said she also had "bad hair" when she heard from Gabriela that Elana's hair was curly, in which Gabriela countered by saying that "Bad is prejudice".

During a chat with Diego Wantowsky and Hariany Almeida, Paula told them about a case of feminicide, where she thought the criminal was going to be a faveladão (man who lives in a favela, whose area's population consists of a 70% majority of self-identified Afro-Brazilians) but was surprised to discover that "he was a white man, who lived in Australia".

Paula once again, in another conversation with Hariany, admitted that she likes bullying people. Laughing, she said that "soon (the network) Globo will be sued for all the bullying we're doing on the show, oh my god, I'm terrible, but it's not bad, I think it's funny".

During another chat with Gabriela and Rodrigo França (both Afro-Brazilians), Paula suggested that "'dumb blonde' jokes can be equated with racism" and asked their opinions on racial quotas in college, claiming that such quotas are a form of discrimination. Finally, she shared her thoughts about the meaning of "black humor": "It's when you pick up a black person and start joking about her. That's black humor".

In a private conversation with Diego and Hariany, Paula threw a shade at her fellow housemates Gabriela, Hana Khalil and Rízia Cerqueira's political beliefs: "These feminists don't want to have a discussion, they just want to talk, thinking they're right in everything, we have to be very careful about what we say around them".

Paula also gave demonstrations of religious intolerance while commenting on Rodrigo's religious beliefs: "I'm very afraid of Rodrigo. He fools around with that kind of stuff... he talks all the time about this Oxum thing. I'm afraid of that. Our God is greater". As result, Decradi (Office of Racial and Intolerance Crimes) in Rio opened an investigation due Maycon Santos and Paula's statements.

Rede Globo has avoided showing most of Paula's bigoted remarks on the daily highlights show, left fans and media wondering if production is attempting to put out a clean image of her, thus favoring her game. The hashtag #BBBProtectsRacists went to the trending topics on Twitter on January 30.

On March 12, 2019, Paula began to be investigated by the police for prejudice based on religious intolerance but was summoned to testify only after she left the house. On April 5, 2019, three days after being evicted, Rodrigo decided to testified against Paula in the Racial Crimes and Intolerance Offices in Rio de Janeiro, accusing her of prejudice against the color of his skin and his religion of African origin.

On April 15, 2019, Paula testified to the police for over two hours and left the district in a car with dark glasses and covered face without talking to press. On April 18, the police concluded that there was prejudice against Rodrigo from Paula's part and, therefore, she will be indicted.

=== Rodrigo ===
After being nominated for eviction by Head of Household Paula on week 11, Rodrigo França's official social media profiles suffered a series of racist attacks and death threats. As result, Rodrigo's family decided to file a lawsuit. According to lawyer Ricardo Brajterman, the offenses were made by fake and non-fake profiles and such criminal posts will be sent to the Computer Crime Repression Office and later sent to the Public Prosecutor's Office to penalize the criminals.

=== Vanderson ===
As soon as the cast was unveiled, Vanderson Brito was accused of physical and psychological abuse by an ex-girlfriend, Maíra Menezes, through her social media account. The case would have occurred 10 years before the start of the season. Vanderson was intimated to testify at the Jacarepaguá Women's Police Station on January 23, 2019. As the rules do not allow anyone to leave the house temporarily, Vanderson was disqualified on the same day, and was not replaced.

== Ratings and reception ==
=== Brazilian ratings ===
All numbers are in points and provided by Kantar Ibope Media.

Week	First air date	Last air date	Timeslot (BRT)	Daily SP viewers (in points)							SP viewers (in points)	BR viewers (in points)	Ref.
Week	First air date	Last air date	Timeslot (BRT)	Mon	Tue	Wed	Thu	Fri	Sat	Sun	SP viewers (in points)	BR viewers (in points)	Ref.
1	January 15, 2019	January 20, 2019	Monday to Saturday; 10:30 p.m. Wednesday; 11:45 p.m. Sunday; 11:30 p.m.	—	22.5	21.0^{1}	23.4	21.5	18.9	13.6	20.1	20.4	
2	January 21, 2019	January 27, 2019	Monday to Saturday; 10:30 p.m. Wednesday; 11:45 p.m. Sunday; 11:30 p.m.	22.6	20.6	24.0^{1}	22.5	21.3	19.0	14.3	20.6	20.6	
3	January 28, 2019	February 3, 2019	Monday to Saturday; 10:30 p.m. Wednesday; 11:45 p.m. Sunday; 11:30 p.m.	24.8	21.1	23.0^{1}	22.1	22.4	19.3	15.9	21.2	20.9	
4	February 4, 2019	February 10, 2019	Monday to Saturday; 10:30 p.m. Wednesday; 11:45 p.m. Sunday; 11:30 p.m.	22.7	19.7	12.0	22.2	23.9	20.4	15.1	19.4	19.9	
5	February 11, 2019	February 17, 2019	Monday to Saturday; 10:30 p.m. Wednesday; 11:45 p.m. Sunday; 11:30 p.m.	22.6	21.1	12.8	20.7	20.5	20.7	14.2	18.9	19.4	
6	February 18, 2019	February 24, 2019	Monday to Saturday; 10:30 p.m. Wednesday; 11:45 p.m. Sunday; 11:30 p.m.	21.5	21.4	13.6	21.8	21.4	19.4	14.1	19.0	19.5	
7	February 25, 2019	March 3, 2019	Monday to Saturday; 10:30 p.m. Wednesday; 11:45 p.m. Sunday; 11:30 p.m.	22.3	20.4	11.6	21.2	25.3	21.2	14.9^{2}	19.6	19.7	
8	March 4, 2019	March 10, 2019	Monday to Saturday; 10:30 p.m. Wednesday; 11:45 p.m. Sunday; 11:30 p.m.	22.5	21.5	12.3	23.7	21.9	19.4	13.7	19.3	19.7	
9	March 11, 2019	March 17, 2019	Monday to Saturday; 10:30 p.m. Wednesday; 11:45 p.m. Sunday; 11:30 p.m.	23.4	22.5	14.6	22.8	23.8	19.5	14.4	20.1	20.5	
10	March 18, 2019	March 24, 2019	Monday to Saturday; 10:30 p.m. Wednesday; 11:45 p.m. Sunday; 11:30 p.m.	23.0	22.0	11.6	22.1	23.1	19.4	12.6	19.1	19.6	
11	March 25, 2019	March 31, 2019	Monday to Saturday; 10:30 p.m. Wednesday; 11:45 p.m. Sunday; 11:30 p.m.	23.7	22.4	14.4	22.8	21.8	19.7	14.1	19.8	—N/a	
12	April 1, 2019	April 7, 2019	Monday to Saturday; 10:30 p.m. Wednesday; 11:45 p.m. Sunday; 11:30 p.m.	23.1	21.9	12.7	23.5	26.1	22.2	14.9	20.6	19.7	
13	April 8, 2019	April 12, 2019	Monday to Saturday; 10:30 p.m. Wednesday; 11:45 p.m. Sunday; 11:30 p.m.	24.6	24.0	12.7	27.9	25.1	—	—	22.8	23.6	

- In 2019, each point represents 254.892 households in 15 market cities in Brazil (73.015 households in São Paulo).
- ^Note 1: This episode aired on a special time at 10:30 p.m.
- ^Note 2: This episode aired on a special time at 8:00 p.m.
