= Big Brother Brasil 18 =

- Season 18
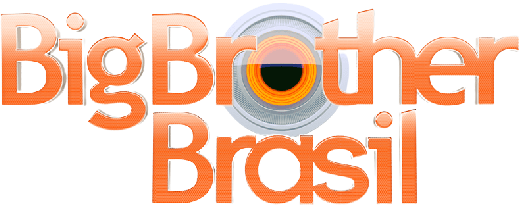
- Presented by: Tiago Leifert
- No. of days: 88
- No. of housemates: 19
- Winner: Gleici Damasceno
- Runner-up: Kaysar Dadour
- No. of episodes: 88

Release
- Original network: Globo
- Original release: January 22 – April 19, 2018

Season chronology
- ← Previous; Big Brother Brasil 17 Next → Big Brother Brasil 19

Big Brother Brasil 18 was the eighteenth season of Big Brother Brasil which premiered on January 22, 2018, on the Rede Globo. The show was produced by Endemol Globo and presented by Tiago Leifert.

The grand prize is R$1.5 million with tax allowances, plus a R$150,000 prize offered to the runner-up and a R$50,000 prize offered to the housemate in 3rd place.

On April 19, 2018, psychology student Gleici Damasceno won the competition with 57.28% of the public vote, over waiter Kaysar Dadour and journalism student Ana Clara Lima & systems analyst Ayrton Lima.

For the first time, the BBB had three winning women in a row.

== Housemates ==
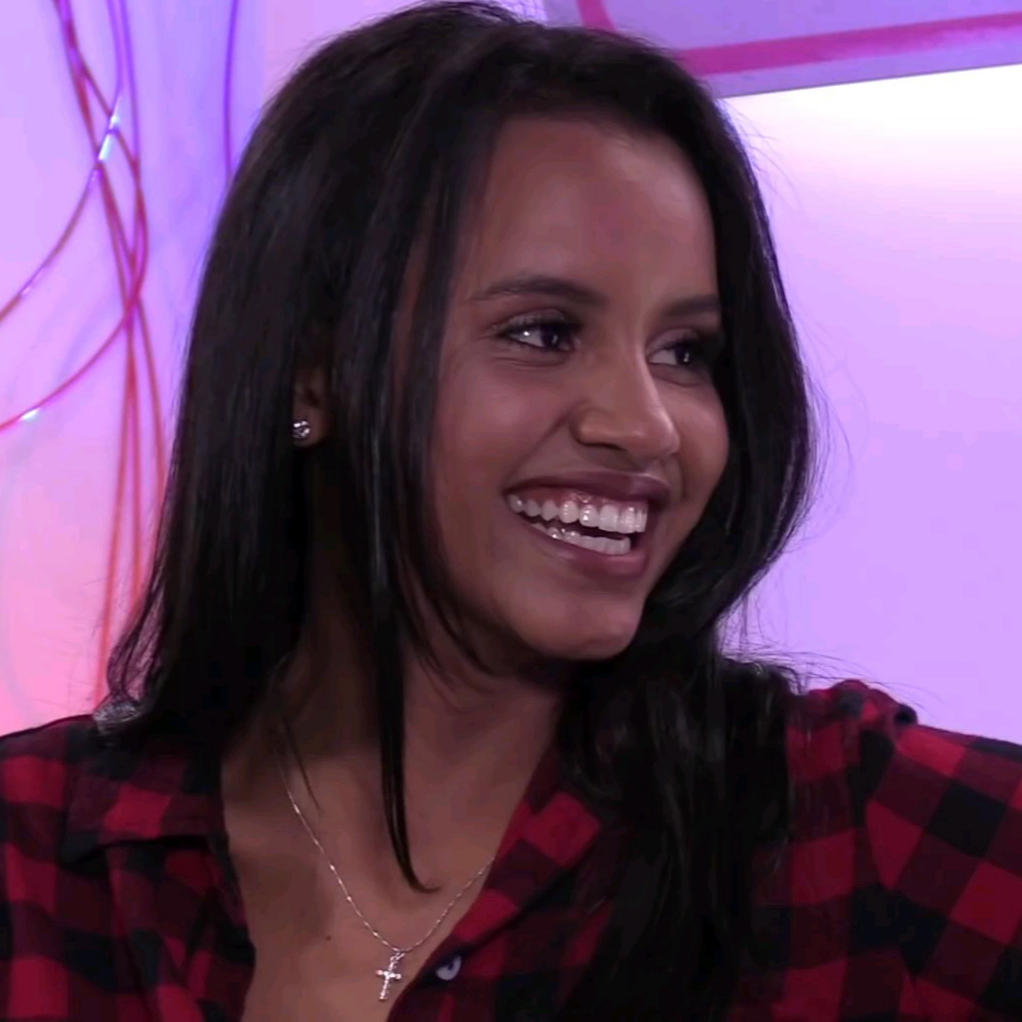
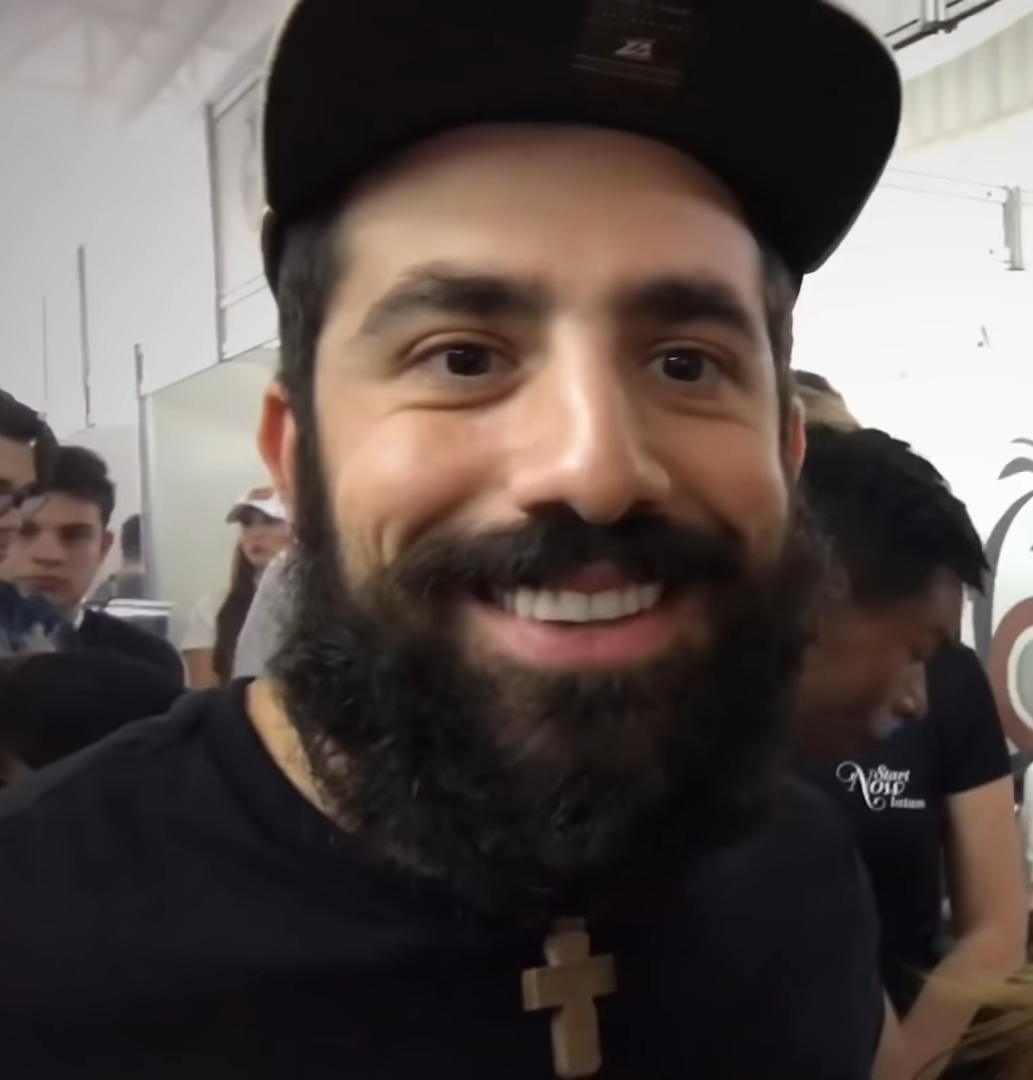
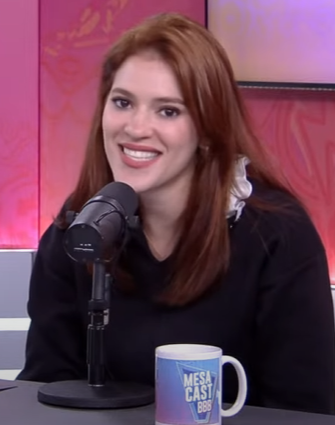
Gleici Damasceno (Winner), Kaysar Dadour (Runner-up) and Ana Clara Lima (Third place), the finalists of Big Brother Brasil 18.

The cast list with sixteen Housemates was unveiled on January 18, 2018.

In addition to the 16 regular Housemates, a 17th Housemate would compete that would be composed of two members of the same family. Initially, four members of the family entered the house with Brazil voting which two would continue in the game – this eviction was held on Day 7.

Name	Age	Hometown	Occupation		Day entered	Day exited	Result
Gleici Damasceno	23	Rio Branco	Psychology student		2	88	Winner
Kaysar Dadour	28	Aleppo, Syria	Waiter		2	88	Runner-up
Ana Clara Lima	20	Rio de Janeiro	Journalism student		1	88	Third place
Ayrton Lima	56	Rio de Janeiro	Systems analyst		1	88	Third place
Paula Barbosa	29	Belo Horizonte	Businesswoman		2	86	14th Evicted
Breno Simões	29	Goiânia	Architect		2	85	13th Evicted
Jéssica Mueller	26	Florianópolis	Personal trainer		2	79	12th Evicted
Viegas de Carvalho	33	São Paulo	Musician		2	77	11th Evicted
Wagner Santiago	35	Curitiba	Visual artist		2	72	10th Evicted
Caruso Junior	34	São Paulo	Advertising professional		2	65	9th Evicted
Diego Sabádo	31	Belém	Writer		2	58	8th Evicted
Patrícia Leitte	32	Icó	Civil servant		2	51	7th Evicted
Mahmoud Baydoun	27	Manaus	Sexologist		2	44	6th Evicted
Lucas Fernandes	27	Fortaleza	Businessman		2	37	5th Evicted
Nayara de Deus	33	Santo André	Journalist		2	30	4th Evicted
Ana Paula Costa	23	São José	Journalism student		2	23	3rd Evicted
Jaqueline Grohalski	23	Rolim de Moura	Biomedical		2	16	2nd Evicted
Mara Telles	53	Governador Valadares	Political scientist		2	9	1st Evicted
Lima Family
Name	Age	Hometown	Occupation	Family Status	Day Entered	Day Exited	Vote-In Result
Ana Clara Lima	20	Rio de Janeiro	Journalism student	Daughter	1	88	Entered Game
Ayrton Lima	56	Rio de Janeiro	Systems analyst	Father	1	88	Entered Game
Eva Lima	51	Belém	Sales director	Mother	1	7	Didn't Enter
Jorge Lima	28	Rio de Janeiro	Production engineer	Nephew	1	7	Didn't Enter

== Future Appearances ==
In 2019, Kaysar Dadour appeared in and won Dança dos Famosos 16, where he won the competition.

In 2020, Lucas Fernandes appeared on Big Brother Brasil 20 as a model in an activity.

In 2021, Gleici Damasceno, Jéssica Müeller, Kaysar Dadour, Mahmoud Baydoun, Paula Amorim and Viegas de Carvalho appeared in No Limite 5. Mahmoud finished in 16th place, Gleici in 11th place, Kaysar in 8th place, Jéssica in 6th place, Viegas the runner-up, while Paula won the competition.

In 2023, Jaqueline Grohalski appeared in A Fazenda 15, where she won the competition.

== Voting history ==
	Week 1		Week 2	Week 3	Week 4	Week 5	Week 6	Week 7	Week 8	Week 9	Week 10	Week 11		Week 12		Week 13
	Day 1	Day 7	Week 2	Week 3	Week 4	Week 5	Week 6	Week 7	Week 8	Week 9	Week 10	Day 74	Day 77	Day 84	Day 85	Finale
Head(s) of Household	(none)	Mahmoud	Lucas	Diego	Ana Clara & Ayrton	Ana Clara & Ayrton	Patrícia	Jéssica; Paula	Ana Clara & Ayrton; Gleici	Breno; Wagner	Kaysar	Kaysar	Breno	Paula	Kaysar	(none)
Power of Immunity	(none)	(none)	Gleici; Jaqueline	Mahmoud	Caruso	Diego	Viegas	Wagner	Caruso	Viegas	Wagner	(none)				(none)
Saved	(none)	(none)	Jéssica	Gleici	Wagner	Patrícia	Viegas	Viegas	Viegas	Viegas	Gleici	(none)				(none)
Power of Veto	(none)	Paula	(none)		(none)	(none)	(none)	(none)			(none)	(none)				(none)
Nomination (Twists)	(none)	(none)	Jaqueline	Ana Clara & Ayrton	(none)	Lucas	(none)	Patrícia	Gleici	Ana Clara & Ayrton	(none)	(none)				(none)
Nomination (HoH)	(none)	Ana Paula; Mara	Gleici	Paula	Nayara	Diego	Paula	Caruso	Diego	Kaysar	Wagner	Breno	Kaysar	Kaysar	Paula	(none)
Nomination (Housemates)	(none)	~~Jéssica~~	Mahmoud	Ana Paula	Gleici; Mahmoud	Caruso	Gleici; Mahmoud	Diego	Jéssica	Caruso	Ana Clara & Ayrton	Viegas	Jéssica	Breno	Ana Clara & Ayrton	(none)
Gleici	Not eligible	Diego	Ana Paula	Ana Paula	Diego	Jéssica	Diego	Jéssica	Co-Head of Household	Jéssica	Jéssica	Jéssica	Jéssica	Not eligible	Not eligible	Winner (Day 88)
Kaysar	Not eligible	Viegas	Viegas	Viegas	Lucas	Lucas	Gleici	Wagner	Wagner	Gleici	Ana Clara & Ayrton	Head of Household	Paula	Breno	Head of Household	Runner-up (Day 88)
Ana Clara & Ayrton	Nominated; Nominated	Diego	Diego	Ana Paula	Heads of Household	Caruso	Diego	Diego	Co-Head of Household	Caruso	Jéssica	Viegas	Jéssica	Exempt	Not eligible	3rd place (Day 88)
Paula	Not eligible	Patrícia	Ana Paula	Ana Paula	Diego	Caruso	Diego	Co-Head of Household	Jéssica	Caruso	Viegas	Viegas	Ana Clara & Ayrton	Head of Household	Ana Clara & Ayrton	Evicted (Day 86)
Breno	Not eligible	Gleici	Caruso	Ana Paula	Gleici	Wagner	Wagner	Diego	Caruso	Caruso	Ana Clara & Ayrton	Viegas	Jéssica	Not eligible	Evicted (Day 85)	
Jéssica	Not eligible	Diego	Ana Paula	Ana Paula	Gleici	Caruso	Gleici	Co-Head of Household	Paula	Caruso	Ana Clara & Ayrton	Paula	Paula	Evicted (Day 79)		
Viegas	Not eligible	~~Jéssica~~	Mahmoud	Mahmoud	Mahmoud	Jéssica	Mahmoud	Jéssica	Jéssica	Gleici	Ana Clara & Ayrton	Ana Clara & Ayrton	Evicted (Day 77)			
Wagner	Not eligible	~~Jéssica~~	Mahmoud	Mahmoud	Mahmoud	Jéssica	Mahmoud	Diego	Jéssica	Caruso	Jéssica	Evicted (Day 72)				
Caruso	Not eligible	~~Jéssica~~	Mahmoud	Mahmoud	Mahmoud	Jéssica	Mahmoud	Ana Clara & Ayrton	Jéssica	Gleici	Evicted (Day 65)					
Diego	Not eligible	~~Jéssica~~	Mahmoud	Head of Household	Gleici	Paula	Gleici	Breno	Breno	Evicted (Day 58)						
Patrícia	Not eligible	~~Jéssica~~	Mahmoud	Mahmoud	Gleici	Gleici	Gleici; Mahmoud	Breno	Evicted (Day 51)							
Mahmoud	Not eligible	Head of Household	Ana Paula	Ana Paula	Caruso	Caruso	Wagner	Evicted (Day 44)								
Lucas	Not eligible	Gleici	Head of Household	Ana Paula	Gleici	Caruso	Evicted (Day 37)									
Nayara	Not eligible	~~Jéssica~~	Mahmoud	Mahmoud	Caruso	Evicted (Day 30)										
Ana Paula	Not eligible	~~Jéssica~~	Mahmoud	Mahmoud	Evicted (Day 23)											
Jaqueline	Not eligible	Gleici	Ana Clara & Ayrton	Evicted (Day 16)												
Mara	Not eligible	Caruso	Evicted (Day 9)													
Eva	Nominated	Evicted (Day 7)														
Jorge	Nominated	Evicted (Day 7)														
Notes	1	2, 3, 4	5	6, 7	8	9	10, 11, 12, 13	13, 14	15, 16, 17	18, 19	20, 21	(none)		22	23	24
Nominated for eviction	Ana Clara; Ayrton; Eva; Jorge	Ana Paula; Mara	Gleici; Jaqueline; Mahmoud	Ana Clara & Ayrton; Ana Paula; Paula	Gleici; Mahmoud; Nayara	Caruso; Diego; Lucas	Gleici; Mahmoud; Paula	Caruso; Diego; Patricia	Diego; Gleici; Jéssica	Ana Clara & Ayrton; Caruso; Kaysar	Ana Clara & Ayrton; Wagner	Breno; Viegas	Jéssica; Kaysar	Breno; Kaysar	Ana Clara & Ayrton; Paula	Ana Clara & Ayrton; Gleici; Kaysar
Evicted	Eva; 11% to save	Mara; 55% to evict	Jaqueline; 65% to evict	Ana Paula; 90% to evict	Nayara; 93% to evict	Lucas; 50% to evict	Mahmoud; 57% to evict	Patrícia; 94% to evict	Diego; 81% to evict	Caruso; 82% to evict	Wagner; 60% to evict	Viegas; 58% to evict	Jéssica; 74% to evict	Breno; 88% to evict	Paula; 62% to evict	Ana Clara & Ayrton; 4% to win
Evicted	Jorge; 21% to save	Mara; 55% to evict	Jaqueline; 65% to evict	Ana Paula; 90% to evict	Nayara; 93% to evict	Lucas; 50% to evict	Mahmoud; 57% to evict	Patrícia; 94% to evict	Diego; 81% to evict	Caruso; 82% to evict	Wagner; 60% to evict	Viegas; 58% to evict	Jéssica; 74% to evict	Breno; 88% to evict	Paula; 62% to evict	Kaysar; 39% to win
Survived	Ayrton; 24% to save	Ana Paula; 45% to evict	Mahmoud; 30% to evict	Ana Clara & Ayrton; 7% to evict	Mahmoud; 4% to evict	Diego; 41% to evict	Paula; 39% to evict	Diego; 3% to evict	Gleici; 14% to evict	Ana Clara & Ayrton; 12% to evict	Ana Clara & Ayrton; 40% to evict	Breno; 42% to evict	Kaysar; 26% to evict	Kaysar; 12% to evict	Ana Clara & Ayrton; 38% to evict	Gleici; 57% to win
Survived	Ana Clara; 44% to save	Ana Paula; 45% to evict	Gleici; 5% to evict	Paula; 3% to evict	Gleici; 3% to evict	Caruso; 9% to evict	Gleici; 4% to evict	Caruso; 3% to evict	Jéssica; 5% to evict	Kaysar; 7% to evict	Ana Clara & Ayrton; 40% to evict	Breno; 42% to evict	Kaysar; 26% to evict	Kaysar; 12% to evict	Ana Clara & Ayrton; 38% to evict	Gleici; 57% to win

=== Legends ===
Started in the Blue team	Started in the Green team
Started in the Red team	Started without team
Entered as Lima Family officially	Did not officially enter

=== Notes ===
- ^Note 1: The Lima's Family (Ana Clara, Ayrton, Eva and Jorge) entered the house on day 1 already nominated. The audience had to choose two to stay in the game. On day 7, Eva and Jorge had the fewest votes and were evicted. Ana Clara and Ayrton remained in the competition as a single housemate billed as Lima Family.
- ^Note 2: On a special competition, the team formed by Caruso, Lucas, Viegas and Wagner was victorious and won two immunities and two prizes of R $5,000, to be distributed among the team. Caruso and Viegas chose R$5,000, while Lucas and Wagner chose immunity.
- ^Note 3: This week, the HoH (Mahmoud) had to nominate two housemates for eviction. The first nominee had to be chosen shortly after the end of the HoH competition (Ana Paula). On Sunday voting, the HoH had to make his second nomination (Mara).
- ^Note 4: Paula won the Power of Veto that could undo the HoH's second nomination (Mara), housemate's nomination (Jessica) or not interfere with the nominations. After announcing the nominations, Paula decided to use her Power of Veto and saved Jessica. Ana Paula and Mara went to the public vote for eviction.
- ^Note 5: On the week on the HoH competition, as the first seven eliminated housemates (Kaysar, Jaqueline, Breno, Gleici, Patricia, Nayara and Paula) would have to face random consequences, placed in bottles. Upon being eliminated from the challenge, Jaqueline ended up taking the bottle with a consequence of being automatically nominated for the eviction. While Breno took the bottle that gave immunity.
- ^Note 6: Like the last HoH competition, the first ten housemates that left the competition had to pick a bottle with random consequences. Wagner took the bottle that gave immunity.
- ^Note 7: Lucas answered the Big Phone and he was informed he should nominate immediately a housemate to face eviction. He nominated Ana Clara & Ayrton.
- ^Note 8: This week, the two most nominated housemates by house faced the public vote alongside Heads of Household's vote.
- ^Note 9: After HoH's and house's votes, Kaysar, due to a random draw, was designated to choose a contestant to be the third nominee. He chose Lucas to join Diego and Caruso.
- ^Note 10: Caruso won immunity during the Head of Household competition after picking the golden ball.
- ^Note 11: This week the winner of the Power of Immunity, instead of giving immunity to someone else, would win the immunity for him/herself. Viegas won the PoI, the housemates were only informed about the twist during the Nominations.
- ^Note 12: This week, the housemates nominated in a face-to-face round of voting, with the two highest vote receivers being nominated along with the HoH's nominee. As a result of a three-way tie between Diego, Gleici and Mahmoud (with three votes each), HoH Patricia had to break the tie and choose which two would be nominated. She nominated Gleici and Mahmoud.
- ^Note 13: This week was a fake double eviction. Whilethe housemate with most votes would be evicted as usual (Mahmoud), the housemates who got fewest votes from the public would be fake evicted and move to a secret room (Gleici). Fake evictee Gleici moved to the Lighthouse and was informed she will be immune for next nomination. She will then have to nominate one contestant automatically for eviction on Friday.
- ^Note 14: Week 7's HoH competition was contested in pairs. The winning pair was Jessica and Paula. In addition to being Co-HoH, the duo had the right to choose between a cash prize of 10,000 reais (chosen by Jessica) and immunity (chosen by Paula)
- ^Note 15: Week 8's HoH competition was contested in pairs. The winning pair was Ana Clara & Ayrton (with Ana Clara participating in the competition) and Gleici. In addition to being Co-HoH, the duo had the right to choose between a cash prize of 10,000 reais (chosen by Gleici) and immunity (chosen by Ana Clara & Ayrton).
- ^Note 16: Diego answered the Big Phone and he was informed he should nominate immediately a housemate to face eviction. He nominated Gleici.
- ^Note 17: As a result of a tie between Caruso and Jéssica (with three votes each), Co-HoHs Ana Clara & Ayrton and Gleici had to break the tie and choose one to be nominated. They nominated Jéssica.
- ^Note 18: Week 9's HoH competition was contested in pairs. The winning pair was Breno and Wagner. In addition to being Co-HoH, the duo had the right to choose between a cash prize of 10,000 reais (chosen by Breno) and immunity (chosen by Wagner).
- ^Note 19: Week 9's Power of Immunity winner (Viegas) won immunity. Additionally, he had the power to nominate the week's third nominee. He nominated the Lima's Family (Ana Clara & Ayrton).
- ^Note 20: From this point forward, all nominations would be made in face-to-face voting.
- ^Note 21: As a result of a tie between Ana Clara & Ayrton and Viegas (with three votes each), HoH Kaysar had to break the tie and choose one to be nominated. He nominated Ana Clara & Ayrton.
- ^Note 22: In week 11, the Housemates competed in a special competition for immunity and a new car. After the competition lasted almost 43 hours, Big Brother stopped the competition for the health of the Housemates. Both remaining Housemates Ana Clara (representing herself and Ayrton) and Kaysar each winning a car. However, they had to choose among themselves who would win the immunity. The immunity winner would be ineligible for HoH and not vote during nominations. The pair chose to give immunity to Ana Clara & Ayrton.
- ^Note 22: During Week 11 Nominations, HoH Paula nominated Kaysar. As Ana Clara & Ayrton had immunity and were not able to vote, Breno and Gleici did not vote as they could only vote for each other and hence their votes would essentially cancel the other's out. As his vote would be the only valid vote cast, Kaysar had the power to name the second nominee between Breno and Gleici. He chose to nominate Breno.
- ^Note 23: Kaysar won the Final HoH, winning his place in the finale. He nominated Paula. Ana Clara & Ayrton and Gleici did not vote as they could only vote for each other and hence their votes would essentially cancel the other's out. As her vote would be the only valid vote cast, Paula had the power to name the second nominee between Ana Clara & Ayrton and Gleici. She nominated Ana Clara & Ayrton, making Gleici the second finalist. Paula and Ana Clara & Ayrton faced each other in the final eviction vote to determine the third finalist.
- ^Note 24: For the final, the public will vote for the housemate they want to win Big Brother Brasil 18.
