= Big Brother Brasil 7 =

- Season 7
- Logo of Big Brother Brasil used from Season 7–11.
- Presented by: Pedro Bial
- No. of days: 85
- No. of housemates: 17
- Winner: Diego "Alemão"
- Runner-up: Carollini Honório
- No. of episodes: 85

Release
- Original network: Globo
- Original release: January 9 – April 3, 2007

Season chronology
- ← Previous; Big Brother Brasil 6 Next → Big Brother Brasil 8

Big Brother Brasil 7 was the seventh season of Big Brother Brasil which premiered January 9, 2007, with the season finale airing April 3, 2007, on the Rede Globo television network.

The show is produced by Endemol Globo and presented by news reporter Pedro Bial. The season was officially confirmed since 2001 as part of the original contract between international Endemol and Rede Globo that provided seasons until 2008.

The grand prize was R$1 million with tax allowances, with a R$50,000 prize offered to the runner up and a R$30,000 prize offered to the 3rd place.

== Overview ==
There were seventeen housemates competing for the grand prize, an increase over the four previous seasons. The season lasted 85 days, an increase of one week over the previous season. For the first time since the fourth season, the finale night featured a final two rather than a final three.

=== Ex-Housemate Exchange ===
When two seasons in different countries are taking place simultaneously, housemates are sometimes temporarily exchanged between them. This season was the first time that Big Brother Brasil allow another contestant of another Big Brother to stay in the house.

Pablo Espósito, from Gran Hermano Argentina 4 spent four days (March 20 to March 25, 2007) in the Brazilian house, while Big Boss winner Íris Stefanelli spent another four days (March 27 to April 1, 2007) in the Argentinian house.

=== Controversy ===
Before the beginning of the show, the announced contestant Yumi Ouchi was replaced by Flávia Viana, as Rede Globo claimed that Yumi had a contract with SBT, another Brazilian television channel, although she denied that.

Another replacement happened on the premiere of the season, when Fernando Orozco was ejected for having a friend who works as a director in the channel, which is against the rules of the show, as anyone who has any type of relationship with a Globo's employee is not allowed to be contestant in the program. He was replaced by Felipe Cobra.

=== After the Show ===
Only two months after the finale, Diego broke up with Íris causing outrage among the fans and viewers. Flávia Viana & Fernando-Luiz Bacalow married in 2007, as Alan-Pierre Miranda & Analy Rosa had a child together named Theo in 2008.

Íris Stefanelli became a personality on the country. She received a big paycheck to pose naked for Playboy. She was contracted by RedeTV! to co-host celebrities show TV Fama. Her lucrative deal was highlighted by the media. Íris is still a host on the show after the huge buzz that ensued her participation on the house

Another Housemate, Flávia Viana, became a personality too. In 2008 she was also contracted by RedeTV! to host the game show Esquenta. She also acts on Chiquititas in 2014, as the teacher Flávia. In 2017, she joined the ninth season of the reality A Fazenda, and became the winner of the season.

== Housemates ==
(ages stated at time of contest)

Name	Age	Occupation	Hometown	Day entered	Day exited	Result
Diego Gasques	26	Webdesigner	São Bernardo do Campo	1	85	Winner
Carollini Honório	21	Student	Rio de Janeiro	1	85	Runner-up
Bruna Tavares	23	Student	Taió	1	83	14th Evicted
Analy Rosa	30	DJ	Curitiba	1	78	13th Evicted
Airton Cabral	25	Designer	Rio de Janeiro	13	76	12th Evicted
Airton Cabral	25	Designer	Rio de Janeiro	1	3	1st Evicted
Alberto Pimentel	30	Financial Analyst	Belo Horizonte	1	71	11th Evicted
Fani Pacheco	24	Law Student	Nova Iguaçu	1	64	10th Evicted
Flávia Viana	22	Promoter	São Paulo	1	57	9th Evicted
Íris Stefanelli	27	Nursing Student	Uberlândia	1	50	8th Evicted
Bruno Jácome	26	Musician	Timóteo	1	43	7th Evicted
Fernando Luiz Bacalow	23	Bank Teller	Osasco	1	36	6th Evicted
Felipe Cobra	30	Skater	Rio de Janeiro	1	29	5th Evicted
Alan Pierre Miranda	23	Student	Recife	1	22	4th Evicted
Liane de Souza	27	Student	Florianópolis	1	15	3rd Evicted
Daniel Bellangero	27	Sports Coach	Barueri	1	8	2nd Evicted
Juliana Regueiro	27	Translator	Brasília	1	3	1st Evicted
Fernando Orozco	27	Production Engineer	São Paulo	1	1	Ejected

== Future Appearances ==
In 2010, Fani Pacheco was contender to be a competitor on Big Brother Brasil 10, but ultimately did not return, eventually in 2013 she returned in Big Brother Brasil 13 and finished in 6th place.

In 2017, Flávia Viana appeared in A Fazenda 9, she won the competition.

In 2020, Íris Stefanelli appeared on Big Brother Brasil 20 as a model in an activity.

In 2021, Íris Stefanelli appeared in No Limite 5, she finished the competition in 10th place.

In 2022, Íris Stefanelli appeared in Bake Off Celebridades 2, she finished the competition in 13th place.

In 2026, Alberto Pimentel returned in Big Brother Brasil 26, he finished the competition in 11th place.

== Voting history ==
	Week 1			Week 2	Week 3	Week 4	Week 5	Week 6	Week 7	Week 8	Week 9	Week 10	Week 11		Week 12	
	Day 1	Repechage	Day 6	Week 2	Week 3	Week 4	Week 5	Week 6	Week 7	Week 8	Week 9	Week 10	Day 75	Day 76	Day 81	Finale
Head of Household	(none)	(none)	Alan Pierre; Flávia	Bruna	Fani	Diego	Fani	Bruna	Alberto	Bruna	Alberto	Carollini	Carollini	Diego	Diego	(none)
Power of Immunity	(none)	(none)	Diego	Felipe	Alberto	Íris	Bruna	Bruno	Íris	Analy	Airton	Alberto	(none)		(none)	(none)
Saved	(none)	(none)	Alberto	Alberto	Fernando Luiz	Fani	Alberto	Carollini	~~Diego~~	Fani	Bruna	Bruna	(none)		(none)	(none)
Veto	(none)	(none)	Bruno	Bruno	Felipe	Flávia	Bruno	Alberto; Analy	Analy	Alberto	Analy	Analy	(none)		(none)	(none)
Nomination (HoH)	Airton; Alan Pierre; Flávia; Juliana	(none)	Daniel	Fernando Luiz	Alan Pierre	Felipe	Fernando Luiz	Bruno	Íris	Flávia	Fani	Alberto	Airton	Analy	Bruna; Carollini	(none)
Nomination (Housemates)	Airton; Alan Pierre; Flávia; Juliana	(none)	Bruno	Liane	Íris	Alberto	Diego	Íris	Diego	Diego	Diego	Analy	Diego	Carollini	Bruna; Carollini	(none)
Diego	Not eligible	BBB; House	Carollini	Alan Pierre	Bruno	Head of Household	Airton	Alberto	Airton	Alberto	Airton	Analy	Bruna	Head of Household	Head of Household	Winner (Day 85)
Carollini	Not eligible	BBB; House	Diego	Liane	Diego	Fernando Luiz	Diego	Íris	Diego	Diego	Diego	Head of Household	Head of Household	Not eligible	Nominated	Runner-Up (Day 85)
Bruna	Not eligible	BBB; House	Bruno	Head of Household	Bruno	Bruno	Diego	Íris	Diego	Head of Household	Diego	Diego	Diego	Not eligible	Nominated	Evicted (Day 83)
Analy	Not eligible	BBB; House	Liane	Liane	Íris	Fernando Luiz	Diego	Flávia	Diego	Diego	Airton	Diego	Diego	Carollini	Evicted (Day 78)	
Airton	Nominated	BBB; Repechage	Evicted (Day 3)	Íris	Íris	Bruno	Íris	Íris	Diego	Diego	Diego	Analy	Analy	Re-Evicted (Day 76)		
Alberto	Not eligible	BBB; House	Íris	Íris	Íris	Íris	Íris	Íris	Head of Household	Diego	Diego	Analy	Evicted (Day 71)			
Fani	Not eligible	BBB; House	Bruno	Alan Pierre	Head of Household	Alberto	Diego	Alberto	Carollini	Alberto	Airton	Evicted (Day 64)				
Flávia	Nominated	BBB; House	Co-head of Household	Liane	Airton	Alberto	Bruno	Analy	Airton	Alberto	Evicted (Day 57)					
Íris	Not eligible	BBB; House	Felipe	Felipe	Airton	Analy	Airton	Alberto	Airton	Evicted (Day 50)						
Bruno	Not eligible	BBB; House	Fani	Liane	Alberto	Alberto	Bruna	Fani	Evicted (Day 43)							
Fernando Luiz	Not eligible	BBB; House	Bruno	Carollini	Carollini	Íris	Íris	Evicted (Day 36)								
Felipe	Not eligible	BBB; House	Analy	Íris	Íris	lávia	Evicted (Day 29)									
Alan Pierre	Nominated	BBB; House	Co-head of Household	Fani	Airton	Evicted (Day 22)										
Liane	Not eligible	BBB; House	Bruno	Alan Pierre	Evicted (Day 15)											
Daniel	Not eligible	BBB; House	Fani	Evicted (Day 8)												
Juliana	Nominated	BBB; Repechage	Evicted (Day 3)													
Fernando Orozco	Ejected (Day 1)															
Notes	1	(none)	2	3	(none)				4	(none)						
Nominated for Eviction	Airton & Juliana; Alan Pierre & Flávia	Airton; Juliana	Bruno; Daniel	Fernando Luiz; Liane	Alan Pierre; Íris	Alberto; Felipe	Diego; Fernando Luiz	Bruno; Íris	Diego; Íris	Diego; Flávia	Diego; Fani	Alberto; Analy	Airton; Diego	Analy; Carollini	Bruna; Carollini	Carollini; Diego
Ejected	Fernando Orozco	(none)														
Evicted	Airton & Juliana; 56% to evict	Airton; 68% to return	Daniel; 72% to evict	Liane; 74% to evict	Alan Pierre; 66% to evict	Felipe; 93% to evict	Fernando Luiz; 78% to evict	Bruno; 72% to evict	Íris; 57% to evict	Flávia; 77% to evict	Fani; 89% to evict	Alberto; 85% to evict	Airton; 91% to evict	Analy; 69% to evict	Bruna; 67% to evict	Carollini; 9% to win
Evicted	Airton & Juliana; 56% to evict	Airton; 68% to return	Daniel; 72% to evict	Liane; 74% to evict	Alan Pierre; 66% to evict	Felipe; 93% to evict	Fernando Luiz; 78% to evict	Bruno; 72% to evict	Íris; 57% to evict	Flávia; 77% to evict	Fani; 89% to evict	Alberto; 85% to evict	Airton; 91% to evict	Analy; 69% to evict	Bruna; 67% to evict	Diego; 91% to win
