= Big Brother Brasil 9 =

- Season 9
- Presented by: Pedro Bial
- No. of days: 85
- No. of housemates: 20
- Winner: Maximiliano Porto
- Runner-up: Priscila Pires
- No. of episodes: 85

Release
- Original network: Globo
- Original release: January 13 – April 7, 2009

Season chronology
- ← Previous; Big Brother Brasil 8 Next → Big Brother Brasil 10

Big Brother Brasil 9 was the ninth season of Big Brother Brasil which premiered January 13, 2009, with the season finale airing April 7, 2009, on the Rede Globo television network.

The show is produced by Endemol Globo and presented by Pedro Bial. That season was officially confirmed since 2008 as part of a millionaire contract between international Endemol and Rede Globo.

The grand prize was R$1 million with tax allowances, with a R$100,000 prize offered to the runner up and a R$50,000 prize offered to the 3rd place.

At the end, Maximiliano Porto from Maricá, RJ, won the competition over journalist Priscila Pires with 34.85% of the final vote (0.24% lead), in the closest vote in the history of the Big Brother series.

== General ==
There were twenty housemates (the largest number of contestants to date) competing for the grand prize, an increase over the previous season. The season lasted 85 days (one of the longest seasons of the show, tied with the fourth and seventh seasons), an increase of one week over the previous season.

The season introduced the notion of "The Battle," in which the house is separated into a luxurious half (A) and a poor half (B), with two teams of housemates constantly fighting for time in the luxurious half. The wall that divided the house was effective only in the first week. For the first time since the sixth season, the Finale Night featured a Final Three rather than a Final Two.

=== During the Show ===
At the launch night, there were eighteen housemates, but only fourteen entered the house. The remaining four contestants were locked for a week in a glass room located at a shopping mall in Rio de Janeiro.

At the end of the first week, viewers could vote one (later two) of the glass house housemates to enter the house. Emanuel (41% to save) and Josiane (37% to save) were chosen. Both entered in the house on day 9 (January 21, 2009).

On day 31 (February 12, 2009), two new housemates (Maíra Cardi and André) entered the house. They lived in a glass house (this time, located at the garden) for 4 days. Viewers could vote "yes" or "no" for both stay in the house. They chose "yes" with 59%.

This is the second time Big Brother Brasil has allowed a contestant of another Big Brother to stay in the house (He was Ricardo "Ricco" Venancio, the winner of Big Brother Africa 3). Ricco entered on day 47 (February 28, 2009) and stayed in the house for 4 days. He left the house on day 50 (March 3, 2009).

Ana Carolina Madeira (one of the most popular contestant of the season) was the housemate with the most number of nominations for eviction in Big Brother Brasil history, being seven times on the chopping block.

=== White Room Controversy ===
The "White Room" was the subject of controversy in the media, viewed as a cruel tactic of psychological torture. This kind of sensory deprivation is also used in CIA interrogations, which only increased the criticism of the block.

== Housemates ==
(ages stated at time of contest)

Name	Age	Occupation	Hometown	Day entered	Day exited	Result
Maximiliano Porto	30	Artist	Maricá	1	85	Winner
Priscila Pires	26	Journalist	Campo Grande	1	85	Runner-up
Francine Piaia	25	Teacher	Rio Grande	1	85	Third place
Ana Carolina Madeira	24	Lawyer	Florianópolis	1	83	14th Evicted
Flávio Steffli	25	Promoter	Caxias do Sul	1	78	13th Evicted
Josiane Oliveira †	30	Singer	Juiz de Fora	9	76	12th Evicted
Milena Fagundes	32	Press officer	Manaus	1	71	11th Evicted
Naiá Giannocaro	61	Promoter	São Paulo	1	64	10th Evicted
Maíra Cardi	26	TV host	São Caetano do Sul	34	57	9th Evicted
Ralf Krause	32	Entrepreneur	São Paulo	1	50	8th Evicted
Mirla Prado	27	Lawyer	Belém	1	48	7th Evicted
André de Almeida†	34	Freelance	São Bernardo do Campo	34	43	6th Evicted
Emanuel Milchevski	24	Management student	São Bento do Sul	9	36	5th Evicted
Newton Siqueira	29	Model	Porto Alegre	1	29	4th Evicted
Alexandre da Silva	35	Businessman	Olinda	1	22	3rd Evicted
Leonardo Jancu	25	Management student	São Paulo	1	21	Walked
Norberto dos Santos†	63	Radio host	São Carlos	1	15	2nd Evicted
Michelle Costa	24	Student and model	Recife	1	8	1st Evicted
BBB Bubble
Daniel Gevaerd	25	Entrepreneur	Campo Grande	1	9	Didn't Enter
Emanuel Milchevski	24	Management student	São Bento do Sul	1	9	Entered Game
Josiane Oliveira	30	Singer	Juiz de Fora	1	9	Entered Game
Maíra Britto	25	Audiologist	Brasília	1	9	Didn't Enter
André de Almeida	34	Freelance	São Bernardo do Campo	31	34	Entered Game
Maíra Cardi	26	TV host	São Caetano do Sul	31	34	Entered Game

== Future appearances ==
In 2025, Francine Piaia, with his husband Júnior R, appeared in Power Couple Brasil 7, they finished in 12th place.

== Voting History ==
The voting table below records whom each housemate voted to nominate on the diary room during his or her time in the House. The Head of Household vote (cast in front of the other housemates) automatically nominate one housemate from eviction. Then, the other housemates voting and if the vote is tied, the HOH breaks the tie (all this types of vote count for the total number of nominations received).

	Week 1		Week 2	Week 3	Week 4	Week 5		Week 6	Week 7		Week 8	Week 9	Week 10	Week 11		Week 12		Nominations received
	Day 1	Day 6	Week 2	Week 3	Week 4	Day 31	Day 34	Week 6	Day 45	Day 48	Week 8	Week 9	Week 10	Day 73	Day 76	Day 82	Finale	Nominations received
Head of Household	(none)	Norberto	Newton	Emanuel	Priscila	(none)	Milena	Ana Carolina	Priscila	Maximiliano	Maximiliano	Milena	Josiane	Flávio	Ana Carolina	Priscila	(none)	
Power of Immunity	(none)	(none)	Ana Carolina	Josiane	Milena	(none)	Emanuel	André	Flávio	Naiá	Ana Carolina	Francine	Maximiliano	(none)		(none)	(none)	
Saved	(none)	(none)	Leonardo	Mirla	Maximiliano	(none)	Priscila	Milena	Milena	Milena	Naiá	Ana Carolina	Ana Carolina; Francine	(none)		(none)	(none)	
Big Phone	(none)	(none)	Leonardo	Newton	Emanuel	(none)	Maximiliano	Mirla; André	Milena	Francine	Francine; Priscila	Priscila	Milena	Francine	Francine; Priscila	(none)	(none)	
Nomination (HOH)	(none)	Maximiliano	Ana Carolina	Maximiliano	Newton	(none)	Mirla	André	Mirla	Ralf	Maíra Cardi	Josiane	Milena	Ana Carolina	Flávio	Ana Carolina	(none)	
Nomination (Big Phone)	(none)	(none)	Naiá	Alexandre	(none)	(none)	Emanuel	Naiá	(none)								(none)	
Nomination (Housemates)	(none)	Michelle; Priscila	Norberto	Priscila	Ana Carolina	(none)	Ana Carolina	Josiane	Francine	Ana Carolina	Ana Carolina	Naiá	Maximiliano	Josiane	Priscila	Maximiliano	(none)	
Maximiliano	BBB; House	Michelle	Ralf	Ana Carolina	Ana Carolina	BBB; House	Emanuel	Josiane	Maíra Cardi	Head of Household	Head of Household	Naiá	Priscila	Josiane	Priscila	Not Eligible	Winner (Day 85)	14
Priscila	BBB; House	Michelle	Norberto	Naiá	Head of Household	BBB; House	Ana Carolina	Josiane	Head of Household	Ana Carolina	Ana Carolina	Naiá; Maximiliano	Maximiliano	Maximiliano	Maximiliano	Head of Household	Runner-Up (Day 85)	15
Francine	BBB; House	Michelle	Ralf	Naiá	Josiane	BBB; House	Emanuel	Josiane	Maíra Cardi	Josiane	Ana Carolina	Naiá	Flávio	Josiane	Priscila	Not Eligible	3rd Place (Day 85)	16
Ana Carolina	BBB; House	Mirla	Milena	Josiane	Flávio	BBB; House	Ralf	Head of Household	Maximiliano	Flávio	Milena	Priscila	Maximiliano	Priscila	Head of Household	Maximiliano	Evicted (Day 83)	23
Flávio	BBB; House	Michelle	Norberto	Ana Carolina	Ana Carolina	BBB; House	Emanuel	Mirla	Ana Carolina	Ana Carolina	Ana Carolina	Naiá	Maximiliano	Head of Household	Francine	Evicted (Day 78)		6
Josiane	BBB; Bubble	Not in House	Norberto	Priscila	Francine	BBB; House	Ana Carolina	Francine	Francine	Ana Carolina	Francine	Maximiliano	Head of Household	Francine	Evicted (Day 76)			10
Milena	BBB; House	Michelle	Norberto	Josiane	Ana Carolina	BBB; House	Head of Household	Maíra Cardi	Maíra Cardi	Ana Carolina	Ana Carolina	Head of Household	Maximiliano	Evicted (Day 71)				4
Naiá	BBB; House	Francine	Norberto	Priscila	Flávio	BBB; House	Emanuel	Priscila	Maximiliano	Francine	Milena	Maximiliano	Evicted (Day 64)					7
Maíra Cardi	Not in House					BBB; Bubble	Not in house	Priscila	Francine	Francine	Francine	Evicted (Day 57)						6
Ralf	BBB; House	Priscila	Norberto	Alexandre	Ana Carolina	BBB; House	Francine	Maíra Cardi	Francine	Ana Carolina	Evicted (Day 50)							4
Mirla	BBB; House	Priscila	Norberto	Flávio	Francine	BBB; House	Emanuel	Francine	Francine	Evicted (Day 48)								5
André	Not in House					BBB; Bubble	Not in house	Mirla	Evicted (Day 43)									1
Emanuel	BBB; Bubble	Not in House	Alexandre	Head of Household	Naiá	BBB; House	Ana Carolina	Evicted (Day 36)										5
Newton	BBB; House	Priscila	Head of Household	Alexandre	Ana Carolina	Evicted (Day 29)												2
Alexandre	BBB; House	Newton	Norberto	Priscila	Evicted (Day 22)													5
Leonardo	BBB; House	Michelle	Priscila	Alexandre	Walked (Day 21)													0
Norberto	BBB; House	Head of Household	Alexandre	Evicted (Day 15)														8
Michelle	BBB; House	Priscila	Evicted (Day 8)															6
Maíra Britto	BBB; Bubble	Evicted (Bubble)																0
Daniel	BBB; Bubble	Evicted (Bubble)																0
Notes	(none)												(none)					
Nominated For Eviction	Daniel; Emanuel; Josiane; Maíra Britto	Maximiliano; Michelle; Priscila	Ana Carolina; Naiá; Norberto	Alexandre; Maximiliano; Priscila	Ana Carolina; Mirla; Newton	André & Maíra Cardi	Ana Carolina; Emanuel; Mirla	André; Josiane; Naiá	Francine; Mirla	Ana Carolina; Ralf	Ana Carolina; Maíra Cardi	Josiane; Naiá	Maximiliano; Milena	Ana Carolina; Josiane	Flávio; Priscila	Ana Carolina; Maximiliano	Francine; Maximiliano; Priscila	
Walked	(none)			Leonardo	(none)													
Evicted	Daniel; Fewest votes to enter	Michelle; 52% to evict	Norberto; 55% to evict	Alexandre; 49% to evict	Newton; 72% to evict	André & Maíra Cardi; 59% to enter	Emanuel; 43% to evict	André; 71% to evict	Mirla; 66% to evict	Ralf; 64% to evict	Maíra Cardi; 62% to evict	Naiá; 59% to evict	Milena; 63% to evict	Josiane; 68% to evict	Flávio; 69% to evict	Ana Carolina; 58% to evict	Francine; 30.54% to win	
Evicted	Maíra Britto; Fewest votes to enter	Michelle; 52% to evict	Norberto; 55% to evict	Alexandre; 49% to evict	Newton; 72% to evict	André & Maíra Cardi; 59% to enter	Emanuel; 43% to evict	André; 71% to evict	Mirla; 66% to evict	Ralf; 64% to evict	Maíra Cardi; 62% to evict	Naiá; 59% to evict	Milena; 63% to evict	Josiane; 68% to evict	Flávio; 69% to evict	Ana Carolina; 58% to evict	Priscila; 34.61% to win	
Survived	Josiane; 37% to enter	Maximiliano; Fewest votes to evict	Naiá; 34% to evict	Priscila; 43% to evict	Ana Carolina; 24% to evict	André & Maíra Cardi; 41% to not enter	Ana Carolina; 41% to evict	Naiá; 25% to evict	Francine; 34% to evict	Ana Carolina; 36% to evict	Ana Carolina; 38% to evict	Josiane; 41% to evict	Maximiliano; 37% to evict	Ana Carolina; 32% to evict	Priscila; 31% to evict	Maximiliano; 42% to evict	Maximiliano; 34.85% to win	
Survived	Emanuel; 41% to enter	Priscila; Fewest votes to evict	Ana Carolina; 11% to evict	Maximiliano; 8% to evict	Mirla; 4% to evict	André & Maíra Cardi; 41% to not enter	Mirla; 16% to evict	Josiane; 4% to evict	Francine; 34% to evict	Ana Carolina; 36% to evict	Ana Carolina; 38% to evict	Josiane; 41% to evict	Maximiliano; 37% to evict	Ana Carolina; 32% to evict	Priscila; 31% to evict	Maximiliano; 42% to evict	Maximiliano; 34.85% to win	

=== Legend ===
	Enter on the A Side		Enter on the B Side
	Enter After		Not Enter
BBB; House	Entered Directly	BBB; Bubble	Glass House
Black; Ball	Vote in Public	Red; Ball	Automatically Nominated
White; Ball	Vote in the Diary Room	White; Room	White Room

=== Notes ===
^1 Leonardo answered the Hot Phone and was informed that he should get a blackboard in the pantry and write in it the names of three participants, in block letters. Among these three, one should be nominated (Naiá), another should be immunized (Francine) and the third (Ana Carolina) would be neutral.
^2 Newton answered the Hot Phone and was informed that he should choose two participants (Leonardo and Ralf) to receive a punishment together with him. After the food competition on Sunday, they should wear a white outfit until vote time, when the punishment (confinement in the White Room) was revealed, which ended with Leonardo walking away from the program and the elimination of the one nominated by the trio (Alexandre).
^3 Emanuel answered the Hot Phone and was informed that by accepting not to participate in the next HoH competition, he would win immunity. Emanuel accepted the proposal, therefore becoming immune, but not eligible to compete for the next leadership. As the Hot Phone indicated nobody, on Sunday Live Nominations, before the indication of the leader Priscilla, balls were drawn to define a third indication (whoever drew a red ball would automatically be nominated). Mirla was the second to draw and got the red ball, becoming nominated together with Ana and Newton.
^4 Maximiliano answered the Hot Phone and was automatically up for eviction. However, there would be a way for him to escape: he should enter the confessional and choose one person to go in his place. If the chosen (Emanuel) received three (or more) votes on Sunday Live Nominations, he would become nominated instead of Maximiliano. Maximiliano would have to convince the housemates to vote in that person, but without giving any clues that it was an exchange. On Sunday, Emanuel received 5 votes and went to the wall in place of Max. As Emanuel exchanged places with Max, the second most voted (Emanuel was the most voted) in the house, Ana, joined Mirla and Emanuel in nomination.
^5 Mirla answered the first call of Hot Phone and indicated Ralf, along with her, watching the parade of Carnival in Salvador. On the second call, Andre answered the Hot Phone and had to choose a Housemate to be automatically up for eviction. He chose to nominate Naiá.
^6 Milena answered the Hot Phone and was informed that should their votes to choose the next two nominations. For this, she should go to the pantry, pick up two red collars, put on your options (Mirla and Maíra Cardi) and keep the secret in danger of going to be automatically up for eviction. Mirla was evicted in the same week and Maíra Cardi was nominated by the HoH, so nothing happened.
^7 Francine answered the Hot Phone and had to choose a Housemate to be automatically up for eviction or give immunity to someone. Francine decided to give immunity to Milena.
^8 Francine answered the first call of Hot Phone and was forbidden answered it again for the next 24 hours. In the second call, Priscilla answered the Hot Phone and was informed that should veto three participants to receive the power of immunity. For this, she should go to the pantry, pick up three yellow collars, put on your options (Ana Carolina, Josiane and Maíra Cardi) and keep this a secret. Inside the Josiane's collar there was a note which informed that she was immunized.
^9 Priscila answered the Hot Phone and was informed that should to vote in two people this week. For the first vote, she should go to the pantry, pick up a white collar, put on your option (Naiá) and keep this a secret. Her second vote should to be on Sunday Live Nominations.
^10 Milena answered the Hot Phone and was informed that she could give immunity someone who were of her same group on the next Food Competition (if her group won only). But, if the other group won, she would have to give immunity someone of there. She also had to keep this a secret.
