= Franklin David =

Brazilian model, writer and DJ

- Born: Franklin David; November 13, 1986 (age 39); Botuporã, Bahia, Brazil
- Occupations: Model, reporter, DJ
- Modeling information
- Height: 1.83 m (6 ft 0 in)
- Hair color: Blond
- Eye color: Green

Franklin David (born November 13, 1986, in Botuporã, Bahia) is a Brazilian model, reporter and DJ with a degree in journalism.

He started his career as a model, passing through major agencies in the country, including Mega Model Management. He made important national and international campaigns, being the first male face of the John John brand. This place, later occupied by Zac Efron. Later, as a journalist, Franklin became known by the entire Brazilian public and the press after joining the cast of the TV Fama program, on RedeTV!

The blonde has already printed the pages of Junior Magazine in a sensual essay and in the Latin publication Gente. In early 2011, where he started as a reporter, Franklin, in addition to the common articles, won a painting called O Reporter Aventureiro, where every week he invited another artist to face a radical adventure. Because of this, its success has been growing more and more.[2]

Despite being always focused on his work on TV, Franklin also worked in theater, passing by the renowned Nilton Travesso acting school. In some interviews, he has already revealed his desire to explore this facet more as an actor, but he regretted that he still couldn't reconcile with TV.

== Personal life ==
Franklin David has already had an affair with Lorena Bueri, who met during a TV Fama recording in 2012, when the model was elected Gata do Paulistão as representative of the Bragantino team.

After a few "hangouts", with the right to be caught by paparazzi during the launch of Sexy magazine, which featured Lorena and model Sabrina Torres on the cover, Franklin assured that he wasn't dating Bueri. The reporter even commented that the two got along well, but the romance didn't evolve.

In June 2021, David came out gay revealing his relationship with tourismologist Vitor Vianna.

== Filmography ==
=== Television ===
Year	Title	Role	Notes
2011–present	TV Fama	Himself	Reporter
2012	Manhã Maior	Himself	Reporter
