= Adriana Lessa =

Brazilian actress, singer, TV presenter, and dancer

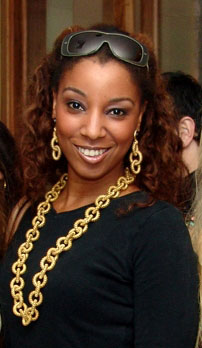
- Lessa in 2005
- Born: Adriana Victor Lessa; 1 February 1971 (age 55); Guarulhos, São Paulo, Brazil
- Occupations: Actress; singer; television presenter; dancer
- Years active: 1986–present

Adriana Victor Lessa (born 1 February 1971) is a Brazilian actress, singer, television presenter, and dancer.

== Career ==
Before beginning her work as an actress in 1986 under stage director Antunes Filho, Lessa was an athlete who competed for the volleyball team of Sport Club Corinthians Paulista and the track team of Guarulhos.

From 2006 to 2010, Lessa co-presented TV Fama on RedeTV! alongside Nelson Rubens and Íris Stefanelli. Following her performances on television and theater, including her role in O Clone, Lessa created her official website to facilitate contact with her audience.

Lessa performed as a guest singer with musical groups representing various styles, including rap, Caribbean music, forró, and MPB. She also performed with her band in Angola. In 1994, she co-hosted Encontro de Rap in Vale do Anhangabaú alongside Paulo Brown and Primo Preto.

In 2002, Lessa made a cameo appearance with the band Renascer Praise at Via Funchal in São Paulo, performing a duet with one of the vocalists. In 2003, she was a member of Igreja Renascer em Cristo.

She was the only Brazilian to participate in the musical Folies Bergère in Las Vegas.

In 2010, she signed with the SBT to appear in the telenovela Corações Feridos. In 2012, she returned to Rede Globo, on the program Na Moral, where she made a special appearance in a docudrama.

== Television ==
As an actress

Year	Title	Role	Notes
1990	Araponga	Tina Macalton	
1993	Retrato de Mulher	Ana Maria	Episode: "Madalena"
1997	Anjo Mau	Camila	Cameo
1997	O Desafio de Elias	Ninra	
1998	Alma de Pedra	Gabriela	
1998	Telecurso	Various	
1998	Você Decide		Episode: "Síndrome"
1999	Chiquinha Gonzaga	Feliciana	
1999	Terra Nostra	Naná	
2000	Aquarela do Brasil	Neide	
2001	O Clone	Deusa da Silva	
2004	Senhora do Destino	Rita de Cássia das Neves	
2005	A Diarista	Magamba Noru	Episode: "Dente Inocente"
2012	Corações Feridos	Silvia	
2012	Na Moral	Regina Célia	Docudrama
2013	Sessão de Terapia	Paula Varella	Season 2
2014	Sexo e as Negas	Madalena	Special participation
2016	Escrava Mãe	Condessa Catarina Gama de Luccock	
2017	Cidade Proibida	Gracinha	
2018	O Sétimo Guardião	Clotilde Lounge	
2019	A Garota da Moto	Delegate Diana Ferreira	Season 2
2019	Bugados	Rebeca	
2022	Rota 66: A Polícia que Mata	Rute	

Presenter

Year	Title
1993	MTV Brasil
1993–1994	Dance MTV
1994–1996	SuperMarket
2006–2010	TV Fama

== Theater ==
Year	Title	Role
1986–1987	Macunaíma	
1987	A Hora e a Vez de Augusto Matraga	
1997	Stravaganzza	
1997	Um gordo em Conquista	
1998	Cabaret Brazil – Musical	
1999	Rent – Musical	
2000	A Mancha Roxa	
2005	Veneza	Rita
2005–2006	O Último Bolero	Kelly
2012–2016	The Vagina Monologues	Betty Dodson
2015	Cartola – O Mundo é um Moinho	Soninha / Deolinda
2017	A Mais Forte	
2017	A Mais Forte II	
2018	MPB – Musical Popular Brasileiro	Vedete Suzete
2020	The Vagina Monologues	Betty Dodson
2023–2024	O Admirável Sertão de Zé Ramalho	
2024	A Partilha	Regina

== Film ==
Year	Title	Role	Notes
1993	Capitalismo Selvagem		Cameo
1996	Com Que Roupa?		Short film
1998	A Hora Mágica	Raquel	
1999	Papel e Água	Fernanda	Short film
2006	Se Eu Fosse Você	Executive	Cameo
2006	Alabê de Jerusalém		Direct-to-video
2017	O Homem Da Sua Vida	Suzana	
2022	Amado	Coronel Solange	
2022	Beyond the Universe	Lurdes	
2024	Inexplicável	Janine	
