= Marcelo Dourado =

Brazilian mixed martial arts fighter

- Born: Marcelo Pereira Dourado; 29 April 1972 (age 54); Porto Alegre, Brazil
- Other names: Moicano
- Height: 5 ft 11 in (1.80 m)
- Weight: 155 lb (70 kg; 11.1 st)
- Division: Lightweight
- Style: Brazilian Jiu Jitsu, Karate

Mixed martial arts record
- Total: 9
- Wins: 1
- By knockout: 1
- Losses: 8
- By knockout: 3
- By submission: 3
- By decision: 2

Other information
- Mixed martial arts record from Sherdog

Dourado in 2004

Marcelo Pereira Dourado (born 29 April 1972) is a Brazilian professional mixed martial artist and personal trainer.

== Early life ==
In his childhood, Marcelo Dourado started to practice Brazilian jiu jitsu and Judo in Porto Alegre, his hometown. Later, he started to learn karate from his father. At the age of thirteen, he began to fight professionally. In football, Dourado is a Sport Club Internacional supporter.

== Career ==
In his first professional MMA fight, Dourado defeated Rafael Capoeira by knockout after only 4 minutes and 20 seconds of round 1. In the following fights, however, he did not achieve the same success and has been defeated in all of them.

== Arrest ==
Marcelo Dourado was arrested by the military police in 2005, along with 27 others, for consuming drugs in an electronic music party in Rio de Janeiro. He was caught smoking marijuana. After being detained for several hours, he was released.

== Big Brother Brasil ==
=== Season 4 ===
In January 2004, he was part of the cast in Big Brother Brasil 4. During his first time in the house, Dourado started a relationship with fellow housemate Juliana. On 8 March 2004, he became the eighth housemate to be evicted with 68% of the votes, finishing seventh overall.

=== Season 10 ===
In January 2010, he was again part of the cast in Big Brother Brasil 10. During his second time in the house, Dourado caused disagreements and controversies by displaying manjis (卍) in a tattoo on his left arm, which were taken to be swastikas. He was also accused of homophobic behavior by some LGBT organizations. Dourado's adviser, Aline Antonoff, issued a press release, in which she stated that the tattoo differs from the Nazi swastika, because it is reversed, and has no connection with it, since the symbol belongs to several cultures. She also denied that the fighter is homophobic.

On 30 March 2010, Dourado became the winner of Big Brother Brasil with 60% of the 154 million votes, defeating dentist Fernanda Cardoso and personal trainer Cadu Parga in the final to take the R$1,500,000 prize.
