= Gésio Amadeu =

Brazilian actor (1947–2020)

- Born: 14 June 1947; Santos Dumont, Brazil
- Died: 5 August 2020 (aged 73); São Paulo, Brazil
- Occupation: Actor

Gésio Amadeu (14 June 1947 – 5 August 2020) was a Brazilian actor.

== Death ==
Amadeu died from COVID-19 in São Paulo on 5 August 2020, during the COVID-19 pandemic in Brazil. He was treated for hypertension problems and contracted COVID-19 at a hospital.

== Filmography ==
| Year | Title | Role | Notes |
|---|---|---|---|
| 1970 | A Moreninha | Rafael | |
| 1972 | Longo Caminho da Morte | Zózimo | |
| 1981 | They Don't Wear Black Tie | | |
| 1983 | O Médium | | |
| 1997–1998 | Chiquititas | Chico | TV series |
| 2005 | As Vidas de Maria | Jorge | |
| 2007 | Sítio do Picapau Amarelo | Tio Barnabé | 35 episodes |
| 2016 | Velho Chico | Chico Criatura | 127 episodes |
| 2019 | Bugados | Seu Andrade | (final appearance) |
