= Big Brother Brasil 10 =

- Season 10
- Presented by: Pedro Bial
- No. of days: 78
- No. of housemates: 17
- Winner: Marcelo Dourado
- Runner-up: Fernanda Cardoso
- No. of episodes: 78

Release
- Original network: Globo
- Original release: January 12 – March 30, 2010

Season chronology
- ← Previous; Big Brother Brasil 9 Next → Big Brother Brasil 11

Big Brother Brasil 10 was the tenth season of Big Brother Brasil. It began on January 12, 2010, and ended on March 30, 2010, on the Rede Globo television network. The show was produced by Endemol Globo and presented by the news reporter Pedro Bial. The season was officially confirmed in 2008 as part of a millionaire contract between international Endemol and Rede Globo. The prize award was R$1,500,000 without tax allowances. The winner was a 37-year-old physical education teacher, Marcelo Dourado, from Porto Alegre, Rio Grande do Sul, who won with 60% of 154,878,460 votes cast, a worldwide record. He had previously appeared on Big Brother Brasil 4, when he finished in seventh place. Anamara Barreira and Elieser Ambrosio returned to compete as veterans in Big Brother Brasil 13, where they were placed 8th and 10th respectively.

== Overview ==
There were seventeen housemates competing for the grand prize (the first season to have an odd number of original housemates), a decrease over the previous season. The season lasted for 78 days, one week less than the previous season.

=== The game ===
Big Brother divided the housemates into five cliques of three: Sarados (the Fit), Belos (the Beautiful), Cabeças (the Nerds), Ligados (the Tunned) and Coloridos (the Colorful/Gays). The housemates played as individuals except when a housemate from a clique won Head of Household, when all members of that clique were immune from eviction. This concept was first implemented in the eleventh season of Big Brother in USA. Five previous housemates returned to support one of the cliques in the House: Joseane Oliveira of Big Brother 3 supported the Belos, Marcelo Dourado of Big Brother 4 supported the Sarados, Rafael Valente of Big Brother 6 supported the Cabeças, Fani Pacheco of Big Brother 7 supported the Coloridos and Natalia Casassola of Big Brother 8 supported the Ligados. Fernanda won the first Head of Household competition for the Belos, allowing Joseane to return to the house as a full housemate and the first Head of Household. She could also choose one of the two male ex-housemates, either Dourado or Rafael, to enter as a full housemate, and chose Dourado.

=== Reunion show ===
The reunion was hosted by Ana Maria Braga and broadcast on April 5, 2010, on the morning news and talk show Mais Você. It was the first reunion since Season 5 and all the former housemates attended. The actresses Deborah Secco and Betty Lago, the singer Preta Gil, season 7 winner Diego Gasques and season 9 runner-up Priscila Pires were special guests.

== Controversies ==
=== Anamara ===
A request for exemption was made on January 29, 2010, by housemate Anamara Barreira to the State Military Police was accepted and the decision was published on February 23, 2010, in the Official Gazette of Bahia. Anamara should have returned from her vacation earlier that month. Without the exemption, she would be considered a deserter and could have been imprisoned for up to two years. The application was lodged by the procurator of Anamara, Amanda Miller. According to Miller, before entering the house Anamara left the application for exemption with an attorney. With the letter of resignation, Anamara could not be considered a defector.

=== Dourado ===
Dourado caused disagreements and controversies by displaying manjis in a tattoo on his left arm, which were taken to be swastikas. He was also accused of homophobic behavior by some LGBT organizations. Dourado's adviser, Aline Antonoff, issued a press release, in which she stated that the tattoo differs from the Nazi swastika, because it is reversed, and has no connection with it, since the symbol belongs to several cultures. She also denied that the fighter is homophobic.

=== Elenita ===
After recording a post-elimination interview with Elenita for a spin-off show, broadcast by the cable channel Multishow, the season 7 winner and main host Diego Gasques criticized the former housemate on his Twitter account, commenting that the two had a fight and she was a disgusting and low level woman. He later deleted the post, but continued posting sarcastic comments about her.

A week after the incident, the season 9 runner-up, Priscila Pires, took over hosting duties from him to interview the last evicted housemate at the time, Angélica Marques.

== Housemates ==
The cast list was unveiled on January 5, 2010.

(ages stated at time of contest)

Name	Age	Type	Occupation	Hometown	Day entered	Day exited	Result
Marcelo Dourado	37	Veteran (4)	P.E. teacher	Porto Alegre	2	78	Winner
Fernanda Cardoso	28	Rookie	Dentist	São José dos Campos	1	78	Runner-up
Cadu Parga	24	Rookie	Personal trainer	Rio de Janeiro	1	78	Third place
Lia Kheireddine	28	Rookie	Dancer	São Paulo	1	76	14th Evicted
Dicesar Ferreira	44	Rookie	Make-up artist	São Paulo	1	75	13th Evicted
Anamara Barreira	25	Rookie	Police officer	Juazeiro	1	71	12th Evicted
Sergio Francischini	20	Rookie	Fashion student	São Paulo	1	69	11th Evicted
Michel Turtchin	30	Rookie	Advertising	São Paulo	1	64	10th Evicted
Elieser Ambrosio	25	Rookie	Agronomist	Maringá	1	57	9th Evicted
Claudia Colucci	28	Rookie	Manager	Ribeirão Preto	1	50	8th Evicted
Angelica Marques	24	Rookie	Journalist	Uberlândia	1	43	7th Evicted
Elenita Rodrigues	30	Rookie	PhD in linguistics & language teacher	Brasília	1	36	6th Evicted
Uilliam Carvalho	24	Rookie	Dancer	São Paulo	1	29	5th Evicted
Alex Vilanova	36	Rookie	Lawyer	São Paulo	1	27	4th Evicted
Tessália Serighelli	22	Rookie	Advertising	Curitiba	1	22	3rd Evicted
Ana Marcela Alves	25	Rookie	Student	Recife	1	15	2nd Evicted
Joseane Oliveira	28	Veteran (3)	Model	Canoas	2	8	1st Evicted

Name	Age	Type	Occupation	Hometown	Day entered	Day exited	Result
Joseane Oliveira	28	Veteran (3)	Model	Canoas	1	2	Entered
Fani Pacheco	27	Veteran (7)	Model	Nova Iguaçu	1	2	Not Selected
Natalia Casassola	24	Veteran (8)	Model	Passo Fundo	1	2	Not Entered
Marcelo Dourado	37	Veteran (4)	P.E. teacher	Porto Alegre	1	2	Entered
Rafael Valente	30	Veteran (6)	Mathematic teacher	São José do Rio Preto	1	2	Not Entered

== Future appearances ==
In 2013, Anamara Barreira and Eliéser Ambrósio returned to compete in Big Brother Brasil 13, where they were placed 8th and 10th respectively.

In 2019, Eliéser Ambrósio appeared with his wife, Kamilla Salgado, in Power Couple Brasil 4; they originally finished in tenth place, but they came back to the game and finished ninth.

In 2020, Claudia Colucci and Lia Khey appeared together on Big Brother Brasil 20 as models in an activity.

In 2023, Dicesar Ferreira appeared on A Grande Conquista 1, he had to compete for a place to enter in the game and he didn't enter.

== Voting history ==
The voting table below records whom each housemate voted to nominate in the diary room during his or her time in the house. The Head of Household vote (cast in front of the other housemates) automatically nominated one housemate for eviction. Then, the other housemates voted and if the vote was tied, the Head of Household broke the tie. (This type of vote counted towards the total number of nominations received.)

Key
– Fit
– Beautiful
– Colorful
– Tunned
– Nerds

	Week 1	Week 2	Week 3	Week 4		Week 5	Week 6	Week 7	Week 8	Week 9	Week 10		Week 11			Nominations received
	Week 1	Week 2	Week 3	Day 25	Day 27	Week 5	Week 6	Week 7	Week 8	Week 9	Day 67	Day 69	Day 74	Day 75	Finale	Nominations received
Head of Household	Joseane	Cadu	Lia	Cadu	Michel	Elieser	Elieser	Michel	Fernanda	Fernanda	Cadu	Cadu	Fernanda	Cadu	(none)	
Head of Household	Sergio	Cadu	Lia	Cadu	Michel	Elieser	Elieser	Michel	Fernanda	Fernanda	Cadu	Cadu	Fernanda	Cadu	(none)	
Power of Immunity	Joseane	Uilliam	Anamara	Fernanda	(none)	Elenita	Dourado	Claudia	Lia	Cadu	(none)				(none)	
Saved	Dourado	Elieser	Elenita	Lia	(none)	Michel	Lia	Elieser	Lia	Lia	(none)				(none)	
Big Phone	Elieser	Ana Marcela	Anamara	(none)	(none)	Anamara	Angelica	Dourado	Dicesar	Dicesar	(none)				(none)	
Nominated (Big Phone)	(none)	Ana Marcela	Anamara	(none)	(none)	Anamara	Angelica	Claudia	Dourado	(none)	(none)				(none)	
Nominated (HoH)	Elenita	Alex	Tessalia	Alex	Lia	Lia	Dourado	Lia	Elieser	Michel	Dicesar	Anamara	Dicesar	Fernanda	(none)	
Nominated (HoH)	Claudia	Alex	Tessalia	Alex	Lia	Lia	Dourado	Lia	Elieser	Michel	Dicesar	Anamara	Dicesar	Fernanda	(none)	
Nominated (Housemates)	Joseane	Angelica	Alex	Elieser; Fernanda	Dourado; Uilliam	Elenita	Dicesar	Dourado	Dicesar	Anamara	Sergio	Lia	Dourado	Lia	(none)	
Dourado	Elieser	Angelica	Elieser	Elieser	Uilliam	Elenita	Dicesar	Claudia	Dicesar	Sergio	Sergio	Dicesar	Lia	Not Eligible	Winner (Day 78)	22
Fernanda	Tessalia	Angelica	Alex	Uilliam	Uilliam	Elenita	Michel	Sergio	Head of Household	Head of Household	Lia	Lia	Head of Household	Lia	Runner-up (Day 78)	15
Cadu	Anamara	Head of Household	Alex	Head of Household	Uilliam	Elenita	Dicesar	Anamara	Dicesar	Anamara	Head of Household	Head of Household	Dourado	Head of Household	3rd Place (Day 78)	3
Lia	Anamara	Elenita	Head of Household	Uilliam	Uilliam	Elenita	Dicesar	Fernanda	Dicesar	Anamara	Fernanda	Fernanda	Dourado	Not Eligible	Evicted (Day 76)	12
Dicesar	Tessalia	Michel	Alex	~~Dourado~~	Uilliam	Cadu	Anamara	Dourado	Dourado	Anamara	Dourado	Lia	Dourado	Evicted (Day 75)		13
Anamara	Lia	Michel	Dourado	~~Dourado~~	Dourado	Dicesar	Dicesar	Dourado	Dicesar	Sergio	Sergio	Lia	Evicted (Day 71)			18
Sergio	Head of Household	Anamara	Alex	~~Dourado~~	Uilliam	Elenita	Anamara	Anamara	Anamara	Anamara	Anamara	Evicted (Day 69)				6
Michel	Joseane	Angelica	Uilliam	Fernanda	Head of Household	Fernanda	Fernanda	Head of Household	Anamara	Anamara	Evicted (Day 64)					6
Elieser	Joseane	Angelica	Dourado	Fernanda	Dourado	Head of Household	Head of Household	Dourado	Anamara	Evicted (Day 57)						7
Claudia	Lia	Sergio	Uilliam	Uilliam	Dourado	Cadu	Fernanda	Dourado	Evicted (Day 50)							2
Angelica	Joseane	Michel	Elieser	Elieser	Elieser	Elenita	Fernanda	Evicted (Day 43)								4
Elenita	Lia	Dicesar	Fernanda	~~Dourado~~	Dourado	Cadu	Evicted (Day 36)									9
Uilliam	Michel	Elenita	Dourado	Fernanda	Dourado	Evicted (Day 29)										11
Alex	Joseane	Anamara	Fernanda	Fernanda	Evicted (Day 27)											6
Tessalia	Joseane	Ana Marcela	Fernanda	Evicted (Day 22)												6
Ana Marcela	Tessalia	~~Tessalia~~	Evicted (Day 15)													1
Joseane	Head of Household	Evicted (Day 8)														5
Joseane	Tessalia	Evicted (Day 8)														5
Natalia	Evicted (Day 2)															0
Fani	Evicted (Day 2)															0
Rafael	Evicted (Day 2)															0
Notes	1, 2	3, 4	5, 6	7, 8	9	10	11	12, 13	14, 15	16	(none)					
Nominated for eviction	Claudia; Elenita; Joseane	Alex; Ana Marcela; Angelica	Alex; Anamara; Tessalia	Alex; Elieser; Fernanda	Dourado; Lia; Uilliam	Anamara; Elenita; Lia	Angelica; Dicesar; Dourado	Claudia; Dourado; Lia	Dicesar; Dourado; Elieser	Anamara; Michel	Dicesar; Sergio	Anamara; Lia	Dicesar; Dourado	Fernanda; Lia	Cadu; Dourado; Fernanda	
Evicted	Joseane; 61% to evict	Ana Marcela; 40% to evict	Tessalia; 78% to evict	Alex; 56% to evict	Uilliam; 58% to evict	Elenita; 52% to evict	Angelica; 55% to evict	Claudia; 62% to evict	Elieser; 59% to evict	Michel; 63% to evict	Sergio; 53% to evict	Anamara; 57% to evict	Dicesar; 58% to evict	Lia; 51% to evict	Cadu; 11% to win	
Evicted	Joseane; 61% to evict	Ana Marcela; 40% to evict	Tessalia; 78% to evict	Alex; 56% to evict	Uilliam; 58% to evict	Elenita; 52% to evict	Angelica; 55% to evict	Claudia; 62% to evict	Elieser; 59% to evict	Michel; 63% to evict	Sergio; 53% to evict	Anamara; 57% to evict	Dicesar; 58% to evict	Lia; 51% to evict	Fernanda; 29% to win	
Survived	Elenita; 33% to evict	Angelica; 36% to evict	Anamara; 13% to evict	Fernanda; 26% to evict	Lia; 30% to evict	Lia; 41% to evict	Dourado; 38% to evict	Lia; 27% to evict	Dourado; 27% to evict	Anamara; 37% to evict	Dicesar; 47% to evict	Lia; 43% to evict	Dourado; 42% to evict	Fernanda; 49% to evict	Dourado; 60% to win	
Survived	Claudia; 6% to evict	Alex; 24% to evict	Alex; 9% to evict	Elieser; 18% to evict	Dourado; 12% to evict	Anamara; 7% to evict	Dicesar; 7% to evict	Dourado; 11% to evict	Dicesar; 14% to evict	Anamara; 37% to evict	Dicesar; 47% to evict	Lia; 43% to evict	Dourado; 42% to evict	Fernanda; 49% to evict	Dourado; 60% to win	

- Note 1: During the first three weeks, when a housemate of a clique won Head of Household, the other housemate of the same clique would also be immune from eviction.
- Note 2: For winning the first Head of Household competition for Joseane (who chose Elenita to be the first nominee), Big Brother gave an extra immunity to Fernanda.
- Note 3: For winning the Monday Night Game, Big Brother gave an extra immunity to Lia.
- Note 4: Ana Marcela answered the Big Phone and had to choose two housemates (Angelica and Tessalia) to wear red collars until the vote. On Sunday, one of them would be nominated for eviction. However, if the chosen housemate nominated her in the Diary Room, she would be nominated instead. Ana Marcela chose Tessalia to be the first nominee. Tessalia nominated Ana Marcela in the Diary Room, so Ana Marcela was automatically up for eviction.
- Note 5: Anamara answered the Big Phone and was automatically nominated for eviction.
- Note 6: The audience voted Dourado to win the "Higher Power", he could overthrow the Head of Household or the house votes or the Big Phone and replace the nominations. This power could only be used once and within the next two evictions. The twist was based on "Coup d'État" from the American Big Brother.
- Note 7: In the first round of nominations in the fourth week, the two housemates who received the most votes would be nominated along with the Head of Household vote.
- Note 8: Dourado played his "Higher Power" and overthrew the house votes, so the four votes against him did not count. He had the casting vote and chose Eliéser (who had received his vote above) to replace him on the nomination.
- Note 9: In the second round of nominations in the fourth week, housemates could only vote in a person who lived that week in the opposite house. First, the Head of Household Michel (Poor House) automatically nominated Lia (Rich House), then the other housemates voting in public, not the Diary Room. The Rich House nominated Uilliam by a 6-1 vote, while the Poor House nominated Dourado by a 5-0 vote.
- Note 10: Anamara answered the Big Phone and was informed that she should choose two housemates (Dourado and Fernanda) to wear red collars until the vote. On Sunday, the house would give immunity to one of the two choices, and also nominate who did not receive that immunity. Anamara should have kept this secret, but she gave some clues about the meaning of the red collars, so Big Brother nominated her as a punishment.
- Note 11: Angelica answered the Big Phone and was informed that she should choose two housemates (Claudia and Sergio) to stay in the White Room together with her. The audience voted for a person who was in the White Room to win immunity and Sergio received the most votes. On Sunday, the house had to choose between sending one or two people from the White Room be automatically nominated for eviction. The house chose to send only one person (Angelica).
- Note 12: For winning the Monday Night Game, Big Brother gave an extra immunity to Dicesar.
- Note 13: Dourado answered the Big Phone and was informed that he should choose one housemate to be automatically nominated for eviction on Sunday and keep this a secret. He nominated Claudia and, therefore, he was banned from nominating with the other housemates.
- Note 14: Dicesar answered the Big Phone and was informed that he should choose two housemates (Anamara and Dourado) to stay handcuffed until the vote. On Sunday, one of the two would be automatically nominated for eviction. He nominated Dourado and, therefore, he was banned from nominating with the other housemates.
- Note 15: Lia won the eighth Power of Immunity competition. However, there was a twist, not known to the housemates, in which the winner, rather than immunize another housemate, would be immunized.
- Note 16: Dicesar answered the last Big Phone and received an extra immunity from Big Brother. However, he had to keep this secret until the vote, or he would lose that immunity.
