= Bugados =

Brazilian Sitcom

- Genre: Fantasy; Comedy
- Created by: Luca Paiva Mello; André Catarinacho
- Written by: Adriano Schmidt; Marina Maria Iori; Thais Falcão; Carlos Daniel Reichel; Luiz dos Reis; Mauricio Svartman
- Directed by: Fabrício Bittar; Henrique Moreira
- Starring: Gabriel Miller; Vinícius Marinho
- Opening theme: Bugados by Pitty
- Country of origin: Brazil
- Original language: Portuguese
- No. of seasons: 6
- No. of episodes: 154

Production
- Executive producer: Roberto Martha
- Cinematography: Eduardo Makino
- Editors: Felipe Falcade; Tales Gremen; Edu Guarizo; Bruno Nunes; André Simões
- Running time: 24 minutes
- Production companies: Floresta; Scriptonita Films

Original release
- Network: Gloob
- Release: October 21, 2019 – December 27, 2023

Bugados a.k.a. Game Crashers is a Brazilian sitcom created and developed by Scriptonita Films that airs on the Gloob. Developed for a young public, the sitcom is a huge audience hit and has aired five seasons of 26 episodes.

The series has premiered its fifth season.

The series was renewed for a sixth and final season.

== Premise ==
Neo, Glinda, and Tyron are video game characters. Mig and Carol are brothers with diametrically opposed personalities. Everything is going smoothly until an extraordinary event happens and changes everyone's lives. Bugados is a children's series that tells the story of a group formed when three video game characters – a robot, a cosmic skater, and an intergalactic defender – jump off the screen and into real life. With the help of Mig and Carol, they become school students and try to have normal lives. Gradually, they find out about their skills and complementary talents. With immense power and little experience, they get involved in all kinds of trouble. Tired of fighting villains and saving the universe, they now have real friends and are looking for something bigger: living the great adventure that is real life.

== Format ==
Bugados is a sitcom with 26 episodes per season, with the broadcast rights for the first two seasons acquired by Gloob (cable channel owned by Globosat). Bugados uses the dynamic and elements of the comedy of errors to produce humor and, at the same time, make the audience empathize with the protagonists. The series is entirely shot in a studio. Its basic scenarios include the premises of a school and a hyper-technological space that mixes game with reality, called INTERMUNDOS, where the group meets to relax, plan their actions and, of course, play video games.

In 2021, to accompany the launch of the third season, Gloob released a free online virtual tour of the series' sets. Developed by VideoPontoCom, the experience began in Intermundos and allowed visitors to explore locations such as the Bugados classroom and the school cafeteria, with games, pop-up videos, scenes and character images.

== Cast ==
Actors	Characters
Gabriel Miller	Mig
Sienna Belle	Carol
Isabella Casarini	Glinda
Ryancarlos de Oliveira	Neo
Vinícius Marinho	Tyron
Manuella Blear	Mabel
Vitor Giudici	Fabinho
Sidney Alexandre	João
Lukas Brombini	Bernardo
Isabelle Aragão	Alicia
Marina Peroba	Nanda
Giovanna Hiromi	Naomi
Fábio Espósito	Diretor Biller
Ed Moraes	Gregório
Adriana Lessa	Rebeca
Renata Augusto	Celeste
Geraldo Mário	Elói
Gésio Amadeu	Seu Andrade
Eliana Guttman	Dona Olga
