= Big Brother Brasil 11 =

- Season 11
- Presented by: Pedro Bial
- No. of days: 78
- No. of housemates: 19
- Winner: Maria Melillo
- Runner-up: Wesley Cunha
- No. of episodes: 78

Release
- Original network: Globo
- Original release: January 11 – March 29, 2011

Season chronology
- ← Previous; Big Brother Brasil 10 Next → Big Brother Brasil 12

Big Brother Brasil 11 was the eleventh season of Big Brother Brasil, which premiered January 11, 2011, with the season finale airing March 29, 2011, on the Rede Globo television network.

The show is produced by Endemol Globo and presented by news reporter Pedro Bial. The season was officially confirmed since 2008 as part of a millionaire contract between international Endemol and Rede Globo. The prize award will be R$1,500,000 without tax allowances.

Actress Maria Melillo won the competition and the grand prize of R$1,500,000, while runner-up Wesley Schunk and third-place finisher Daniel Rolim walked away with R$150,000 and R$50,000 respectively.

== Production ==
=== Cast ===
Applications were due by September 10, 2010 until October 31, 2010. Initially, the process was set to start September 1, 2010 but was postponed to avoid an eventual confusion with the premiere of the second season of Hipertensão, another Rede Globo reality television show.

Semi-finalist interviews were held in November 2010 and the final casting interviews took place in early December 2010. There were nineteen housemates competing for the grand prize: ten women and nine men.

The first housemate, a woman, was officially chosen on October 10, 2010, but did not have their identity revealed. Producers reported that she was chosen in virtual chat, which happened at the show's official website. VH1's alumni Marcia Brazil from Rock of Love Bus with Bret Michaels, Charm School with Ricki Lake and I Love Money has also applied to be on the show.

=== The House ===
According to the producers, the Big Brother House passed by the biggest reform in history, with the entire structure being redesigned for the new season.

Big Brother divided the housemates into four teams. Two of them (the Orange team and the Green team) enjoyed the luxury and comfort of the new mansion, which had two floors. The other two teams (the Red team and the Blue team) stayed in the other side, which lack beds, food and structure for any activity.

At the end of the week five, the teams dissolved, and the remaining twelve housemates were divided into two groups, one would live at the Rich House and the other would have to live at the Poor House.

== The Game ==
=== Saboteur ===
Each week, one of the housemates is chosen by internet poll to be the Big Brother Saboteur. The saboteur had the goal to disrupt life in the House and cause as much havoc as possible. The production crew chooses the mission, and if the saboteur does it successfully, he/she would win R$10,000.

Results

Task	Air Date	Saboteur	Mission	Result
1	January 16, 2011	Rodrigão; 13.55% (out of 17)	Make his own team lose the Food Competition.	Completed
2	January 23, 2011	Diogo; 15.46% (out of 16)	Locking the storage room door of either the Rich House or the Poor House.	FailedS1

^Note S1 : Diogo managed to lock the Poor House's door with a padlock but his identity was uncovered after he dropped its key in front of Cristiano.

=== Glass House ===
On day 23, Big Brother brought back the Glass House (BBB Bubble), which first appeared in the ninth season of the show. This time, the house confined the first five evicted housemates (Ariadna, Mauricio, Rodrigo, Michelly and Igor) for a new shot to win the game. The public had to choose just one of the contestant to return to the program. Mauricio was elected and returned to the game on day 27.

Place	Housemate	Public Vote	Result
1	Mauricio	40%	Winner
2	Ariadna	23%	2nd
3	Rodrigo	16%	3rd
4	Michelly	15%	4th
5	Igor	6%	5th

=== Horror Room ===
On day 42, as common on Monday nights, there was a joke. The consequence for the most voted housemates in it (Diana, Paula) was to face the Horror room. In this room, they should find two keys, among two thousands scattered in the floor, that would open the two existing locks. Diana and Paula should compete that mission in 10 hours. If they could not perform it, they should decide which of the two would be the first nominated. If they did not, this week's HoH (in this case, Maria) would decide which of them would be nominated. For the housemates in the house, host Pedro Bial said that each side of the house (main house and poor house) should come to a consensus and choose which ones would offer to be nominated. Talula volunteered to be the choice from main house and Janaina volunteered to be from the poor house. If girls in the Horror room concluded the task, they should choose either Janaina and Talula to be nominated. After about an hour and a half, Diana and Paula were able to complete the mission and were released from the room. Later, they decided to nominate Janaina.

=== Double Eviction Night ===
The first round of nominations in the third week featured the second double eviction in Big Brother Brasil history, with a female and a male evictees leaving the House on day 20. Housemates Michelly and Rodrigo were both eliminated in a surprise eviction, after losing individual mas first implemented on the third season of the show.

On day 43, Big Brother bosses have revealed that two of week 7's three nominated housemates would leave the house in another double eviction, which took place on day 50 in a regular eviction night. Diogo and Janaina, who received the highest percentages of the public vote (44% and 33% respectively) were both eliminated in a match against Paula. This concept is a first in the Brazilian series.

== Housemates ==
The cast list was unveiled on January 4, 2011.

(ages stated at time of contest)

Name	Age	Occupation	Hometown	Day entered	Day exited	Result
Maria Melillo	27	Actress	São Paulo	1	78	Winner
Wesley Schunk	24	Doctor	Vila Velha	20	78	Runner-up
Daniel Rolim	40	Administrator	Recife	1	78	Third place
Diana Balsini	29	Producer	Rio de Janeiro	1	76	15th Evicted
Rodrigão Gomes	22	Model	Curitiba	1	71	14th Evicted
Paula Leite	23	Student	Boa Vista	1	69	13th Evicted
Jaqueline Faria	27	Dancer	Rio de Janeiro	1	64	12th Evicted
Maurício Joaquim	27	Musician	Rio de Janeiro	27	62	11th Evicted
Maurício Joaquim	27	Musician	Rio de Janeiro	1	15	2nd Evicted
Talula Pascoli	29	Model	São Paulo	1	57	10th Evicted
Janaina Santos	25	Dancer	São Paulo	1	50	9th Evicted
Diogo Pretto	24	Dancer	Salvador	1	50	9th Evicted
Adriana Sant'anna	19	Student	Campos dos Goytacazes	20	43	8th Evicted
Natalia Castro	27	Criminal Analyst	Coronel Fabriciano	1	36	7th Evicted
Lucival França	29	Journalist	Salvador	1	34	6th Evicted
Cristiano Naya	33	Engineer	São Paulo	1	29	5th Evicted
Igor Pachi	25	Barman	São Paulo	1	22	4th Evicted
Michelly Freitas	27	Promoter	São Paulo	1	20	3rd Evicted
Rodrigo Carvalho	26	Administrator	Jaboatão dos Guararapes	1	20	3rd Evicted
Ariadna Thalia	26	Hair Stylist	Rio de Janeiro	1	8	1st Evicted

== Future appearances ==
In 2021, Ariadna Thalia appeared in No Limite 5, she finished the competition in 14th place.

== Voting History ==
Key
– Red team
– Blue team
– Orange team
– Green team

	Week 1	Week 2	Week 3			Week 4		Week 5		Week 6	Week 7	Week 8	Week 9		Week 10		Week 11	
	Week 1	Week 2	Day 18		Day 20	Day 24	Day 27	Day 32	Day 34	Week 6	Week 7	Week 8	Day 60	Day 62	Day 67	Day 69	Day 75	Finale
	Week 1	Week 2	Male	Female	Day 20	Day 24	Day 27	Day 32	Day 34	Week 6	Week 7	Week 8	Day 60	Day 62	Day 67	Day 69	Day 75	Finale
Head of Household	Cristiano	Natália	Igor		Talula	(none)	Jaqueline	Wesley	Talula	Maria	Daniel	Rodrigão	Paula	Daniel	Rodrigão	Wesley	Daniel	(none)
Power of Immunity	Natália	Daniel	Maria		(none)	(none)	Daniel	Maurício	(none)	Paula	Janaína	Diana	Maurício	(none)		Wesley	(none)	(none)
Saved	Rodrigão	Talula	Talula		(none)	(none)	Lucival	Rodrigão	(none)	Maurício	Diana	Diana	Rodrigão	(none)		Maria	(none)	(none)
Big Phone	Rodrigão	Mauricio	Natalia		(none)	(none)	(none)	Adriana	(none)	Rodrigão	(none)	Jaqueline	Daniel	(none)	Maria	(none)	(none)	(none)
Nominated (Twist)	Lucival	(none)			(none)	(none)	(none)	Diana	(none)	Rodrigão	Janaína	Wesley	Maurício	(none)	Paula	(none)	(none)	(none)
Nominated (HoH)	Ariadna	Maurício	Rodrigo	Maria	Igor	(none)	Cristiano	Natália	Adriana	Adriana	Diogo	Talula	Wesley	Jaqueline	Diana	Daniel; Diana; Rodrigão	Diana; Maria; Wesley	(none)
Nominated (Housemates)	Janaína	Diogo	Rodrigão	Michelly	Diana	(none)	Rodrigão	Lucival	Natália	Wesley	Paula	Daniel	Diana	Rodrigão	Wesley	Daniel; Diana; Rodrigão	Diana; Maria; Wesley	(none)
Maria	Janaína	Michelly	Lucival	Michelly	Natália	BBB; House	Janaína	Lucival	Natália	Wesley	Wesley	Maurício	Diana	Rodrigão	Wesley	Saved	Nominated	Winner (Day 78)
Wesley	Not in House					BBB; House	Natália	Head of Household	Natália	Janaína	Paula	Jaqueline	Jaqueline	Paula	Daniel	Head of Household	Nominated	Runner-Up (Day 78)
Daniel	Diogo	Diogo	Rodrigão	Natália	Natália	BBB; House	Rodrigão	Diogo	Diogo	Diogo	Head of Household	Paula	Jaqueline	Rodrigão	Wesley	Nominated	Head of Household	3rd Place (Day 78)
Diana	Diogo	Diogo	Rodrigão	Michelly	Cristiano	BBB; House	Rodrigão	Adriana	Wesley	Wesley	Maurício	Maurício	Jaqueline	Rodrigão	Maria	Nominated	Nominated	Evicted (Day 76)
Rodrigão	Not; Eligible	Michelly	Diogo	Diana	Diana	BBB; House	Paula	Lucival	Natalia	Diana	Paula	Daniel	Diana	Diana	Head of Household	Nominated	Evicted (Day 71)	
Paula	Diogo	Diogo	Rodrigão	Diana	Janaína	BBB; House	Rodrigão	Diogo	Rodrigão	Janaína	Rodrigão	Daniel	Head of Household	Wesley	Wesley	Evicted (Day 69)		
Jaqueline	Janaína	Diogo	Cristiano	Michelly	Cristiano	BBB; House	Head of Household	Lucival	Wesley	Wesley	Wesley	Daniel	Diana	Wesley	Evicted (Day 64)			
Maurício	Janaína	Michelly	Evicted (Day 15)			BBB; Bubble	Evicted (Day 15)	Lucival	Natália	Diana	Talula	Daniel	Diana	Re-Evicted (Day 62)				
Talula	Janaína	Cristiano	Rodrigão	Michelly	Head of Household	BBB; House	Rodrigão	Adriana	Head of Household	Janaína	Wesley	Maurício	Evicted (Day 57)					
Janaína	Rodrigo	Rodrigão	Rodrigão	Paula	Cristiano	BBB; House	Rodrigão	Maria	Jaqueline	Wesley	Paula	Evicted (Day 50)						
Diogo	Diana	Diana	Daniel	Diana	Diana	BBB; House	Paula	Lucival	Natalia	Paula	Paula	Evicted (Day 50)						
Adriana	Not in House					BBB; House	Diana	Lucival	Paula	Diana	Evicted (Day 43)							
Natália	Maurício	Diogo	Diogo	Jaqueline	Maria	BBB; House	Rodrigão	Diogo	Wesley	Evicted (Day 36)								
Lucival	Rodrigo	Rodrigão	Rodrigão	Jaqueline	Jaqueline	BBB; House	Rodrigão	Jaqueline	Evicted (Day 34)									
Cristiano	Head of Household	Rodrigo	Diogo	Diana	Diana	BBB; House	Diana	Evicted (Day 29)										
Igor	Diana	Rodrigo	Head of Household		Diana	BBB; Bubble	Evicted (Day 22)											
Michelly	Maria	Maria	Rodrigão	Jaqueline	Evicted (Day 20)	BBB; Bubble	Evicted (Day 20)											
Rodrigo	Janaína	Michelly	Daniel	Michelly	Evicted (Day 20)	BBB; Bubble	Evicted (Day 20)											
Ariadna	Janaína	Evicted (Day 8)				BBB; Bubble	Evicted (Day 8)											
Notes	1, 2, 3	4, 5, 6	7, 8		(none)		9	10	(none)	11, 12	13	14, 15, 16	17	18, 19	20	21	22	(none)
Nominated for Eviction	Ariadna; Janaína; Lucival	Diogo; Maurício	Rodrigão; Rodrigo	Maria; Michelly	Diana; Igor	Ariadna; Igor; Maurício; Michelly; Rodrigo	Cristiano; Rodrigão	Diana; Lucival; Natália	Adriana; Natália	Adriana; Rodrigão; Wesley	Diogo; Janaína; Paula	Daniel; Talula; Wesley	Diana; Maurício; Wesley	Jaqueline; Rodrigão; Wesley	Diana; Paula; Wesley	Daniel; Diana; Rodrigão	Diana; Maria; Wesley	Daniel; Maria; Wesley
Evicted	Ariadna; 49% to evict	Maurício; 50.81% to evict	Rodrigo; 62% to evict	Michelly; 56% to evict	Igor; 55% to evict	Maurício; 40% to return	Cristiano; 78% to evict	Lucival; 48% to evict	Natália; 54% to evict	Adriana; 45% to evict	Diogo; 44% to evict	Talula; 61% to evict	Maurício; 63% to evict	Jaqueline; 63% to evict	Paula; 63% to evict	Rodrigão; 51% to evict	Diana; 75% to evict	Daniel; 26% to win
Evicted	Ariadna; 49% to evict	Maurício; 50.81% to evict	Rodrigo; 62% to evict	Michelly; 56% to evict	Igor; 55% to evict	Maurício; 40% to return	Cristiano; 78% to evict	Lucival; 48% to evict	Natália; 54% to evict	Adriana; 45% to evict	Janaína; 33% to evict	Talula; 61% to evict	Maurício; 63% to evict	Jaqueline; 63% to evict	Paula; 63% to evict	Rodrigão; 51% to evict	Diana; 75% to evict	Wesley; 31% to win
Survived	Lucival; 27% to evict	Diogo; 49.19% to evict	Rodrigão; 38% to evict	Maria; 44% to evict	Diana; 45% to evict	Ariadna; 23% to return	Rodrigão; 22% to evict	Diana; 41% to evict	Adriana; 46% to evict	Wesley; 43% to evict	Paula; 23% to evict	Wesley; 31% to evict	Diana; 34% to evict	Rodrigão; 20% to evict	Diana; 34% to evict	Diana; 43% to evict	Maria; 16% to evict	Maria; 43% to win
Survived	Lucival; 27% to evict	Diogo; 49.19% to evict	Rodrigão; 38% to evict	Maria; 44% to evict	Diana; 45% to evict	Michelly; 16% to return	Rodrigão; 22% to evict	Diana; 41% to evict	Adriana; 46% to evict	Wesley; 43% to evict	Paula; 23% to evict	Wesley; 31% to evict	Diana; 34% to evict	Rodrigão; 20% to evict	Diana; 34% to evict	Diana; 43% to evict	Maria; 16% to evict	Maria; 43% to win
Survived	Janaína; 24% to evict	Diogo; 49.19% to evict	Rodrigão; 38% to evict	Maria; 44% to evict	Diana; 45% to evict	Rodrigo; 15% to return	Rodrigão; 22% to evict	Natália; 11% to evict	Adriana; 46% to evict	Rodrigão; 12% to evict	Paula; 23% to evict	Daniel; 8% to evict	Wesley; 3% to evict	Wesley; 17% to evict	Wesley; 3% to evict	Daniel; 6% to evict	Wesley; 9% to evict	Maria; 43% to win
Survived	Janaína; 24% to evict	Diogo; 49.19% to evict	Rodrigão; 38% to evict	Maria; 44% to evict	Diana; 45% to evict	Igor; 6% to return	Rodrigão; 22% to evict	Natália; 11% to evict	Adriana; 46% to evict	Rodrigão; 12% to evict	Paula; 23% to evict	Daniel; 8% to evict	Wesley; 3% to evict	Wesley; 17% to evict	Wesley; 3% to evict	Daniel; 6% to evict	Wesley; 9% to evict	Maria; 43% to win

=== Notes ===
- Note 1: During the launch night, the housemates had to vote for one person who they wanted to evict. What they didn't know was that the housemate with the most votes would not be evicted but would actually gain immunity from the first eviction. Michelly received the most votes with 5 and won immunity from the first eviction.
- Note 2: During the first week when a housemate of a team wins Head of Household, the other housemate of the same team will also be immune from eviction along with the Head of Household.
- Note 3: Rodrigão answered the Big Phone was informed that he should be choose one housemate to be automatically nominated for eviction on Sunday and keep it as a secret. He nominated Lucival and, therefore, he was banned from nominating with the other housemates.
- Note 4: Mauricio answered the Big Phone and was instructed to send a housemate to the solitary for 17 hours. He chose Michelly.
- Note 5: Natalia, the Head of Household, had to choose a member of her team to win won immunity from the second eviction. She chose Igor.
- Note 6: Diogo and Michelly received the most nominations with 4 each. Natalia, the Head of Household, had the casting vote and chose Diogo to be the 2nd nominee.
- Note 7: Natalia answered the Big Phone and won free ice cream for her and two friends.
- Note 8: The first round of nominations in the third week featured a double eviction. Igor, the Head of Household, had to automatically nominate a male and a female housemate, he chose Maria and Rodrigo to be the nominees. Then, each Housemate had to nominate a male and a female. Rodrigão received the most nominations with 7 and Michelly the most out of the females with 5.
- Note 9: Unknown to the housemates Adriana and Wesley received immunity for their first week in the game.
- Note 10: Adriana answered the Big Phone was informed that she should be choose one housemate to be automatically nominated for eviction. She nominated Diana.
- Note 11: Rodrigão answered the Big Phone and was automatically nominated for eviction.
- Note 12: Diana, Janaina and Wesley received the most nominations with 3 each. Maria, the Head of Household, had the casting vote and chose Wesley to be the 3rd nominee.
- Note 13: Janaina was automatically nominated for eviction by Diana and Paula, who survived the Horror Room.
- Note 14: Jaqueline answered the Big Phone and was informed that she should choose two housemates to wear Hawaiian necklaces until the vote. Diana and Wesley were her choices. On Sunday, she chose Wesley to be automatically nominated for eviction.
- Note 15: Diana won the eighth Power of Immunity competition. However, there was a twist (not known by the housemates) in which the winner, rather than immunize another housemate, would be immunized.
- Note 16: Daniel and Mauricio received the most nominations with 3 each. Rodrigão, the Head of Household, had the casting vote and chose Daniel to be the 3rd nominee.
- Note 17: Daniel answered the Big Phone was informed that he should be choose one housemate to be automatically nominated for eviction. He nominated Mauricio.
- Note 18: Rodrigão and Wesley received the most nominations with 2 each. Daniel, the Head of Household, had the casting vote and chose Rodrigão to be the 2nd nominee.
- Note 19: Jaqueline and Rodrigão had to choose a 3rd person to nominate for eviction, as they were already up. They chose Wesley.
- Note 20: Maria answered the Big Phone was informed that she should be choose one housemate to be automatically nominated for eviction. She nominated Paula.
- Note 21: The second round of nominations in the tenth week didn't have an actual vote. After winning the Head of Household competition, Wesley was instructed to save one contestant, automatically nominating the other 3 for eviction. He chose to save Maria, putting Daniel, Diana and Rodrigão up for eviction.
- Note 22: Daniel won the final Head of Household competition. Therefore, Diana, Maria and Wesley were automatically nominated for eviction by default.

=== Have and Have-Nots ===
	Week 1	Week 2	Week 3	Week 4	Week 5	Week 6	Week 7	Week 8	Week 9	Week 10
Maria	Have-Not	Have-Not	Have	Have-Not	Have-Not	Have	Have	Have	Have	Have
Wesley	Not in House			Have-Not	Have-Not	Have	Have	Have	Have	Have-Not
Daniel	Have-Not	Have-Not	Have	Have-Not	Have	Have-Not	Have-Not	Have-Not	Have-Not	Have
Diana	Have-Not	Have-Not	Have	Have	Have	Have-Not	Have-Not	Have-Not	Have-Not	Have
Rodrigão	Have-Not	Have-Not	Have-Not	Have	Have-Not	Have	Have	Have	Have	Have-Not
Paula	Have	Have	Have	Have-Not	Have-Not	Have	Have	Have	Have	Have-Not
Jaqueline	Have-Not	Have-Not	Have	Have-Not	Have-Not	Have	Have	Have	Have-Not	
Maurício	Have-Not	Have-Not			Have	Have-Not	Have-Not	Have-Not	Have-Not	
Talula	Have-Not	Have-Not	Have	Have-Not	Have-Not	Have	Have	Have-Not		
Janaína	Have	Have	Have-Not	Have	Have	Have-Not	Have-Not			
Diogo	Have	Have	Have-Not	Have	Have-Not	Have-Not	Have-Not			
Adriana	Not in House			Have	Have	Have-Not				
Natália	Have	Have	Have-Not	Have	Have					
Lucival	Have	Have	Have-Not	Have-Not	Have					
Cristiano	Have	Have	Have-Not	Have						
Igor	Have	Have	Have-Not							
Michelly	Have	Have	Have-Not							
Rodrigo	Have-Not	Have-Not	Have							
Ariadna	Have-Not									
