= SOS Fairy Manu =

Brazilian animated television series

SOS Fairy Manu (Portuguese: SOS Fada Manu) is a Brazilian children's animated series produced by TeamTO, Boutique Filmes and Lightstar Studios. It was broadcast on paid channel Gloob on July 13, 2015, The series has also aired on TV Brasil, TV Cultura and TV Brasil.

The series was nominated for the 5th International Emmy Kids Award in 2016.

== Story ==
Manu is a 10-year-old apprentice fairy godmother who lives under the guidance of her grandmother, an experienced retired fairy, in the enchanted kingdom. Her magic wand is an umbrella, and with it Manu will have to learn to study magic, fulfill wishes and face the witch Valquíria who always tries to dominate the kingdom. Manu counts on the help of the frog Duque and the troubled João in their adventures.

The soundtrack is composed by the guitarist Alessandro Penezzi and is entirely based on choro and its aspects.

== List of episodes ==
Seasons	Episodes	Original airdate	
Seasons	Episodes	Debut	End
1	26	July 13, 2015	August 3, 2015
2	26	November 7, 2016	December 13, 2016
3	13	November 16, 2018	November 29, 2018
4	13	September 16, 2019	October 2, 2019
