= Botuporã =

Municipality of Bahia, Brazil

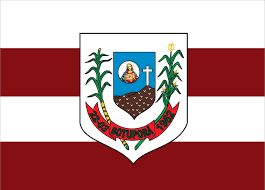
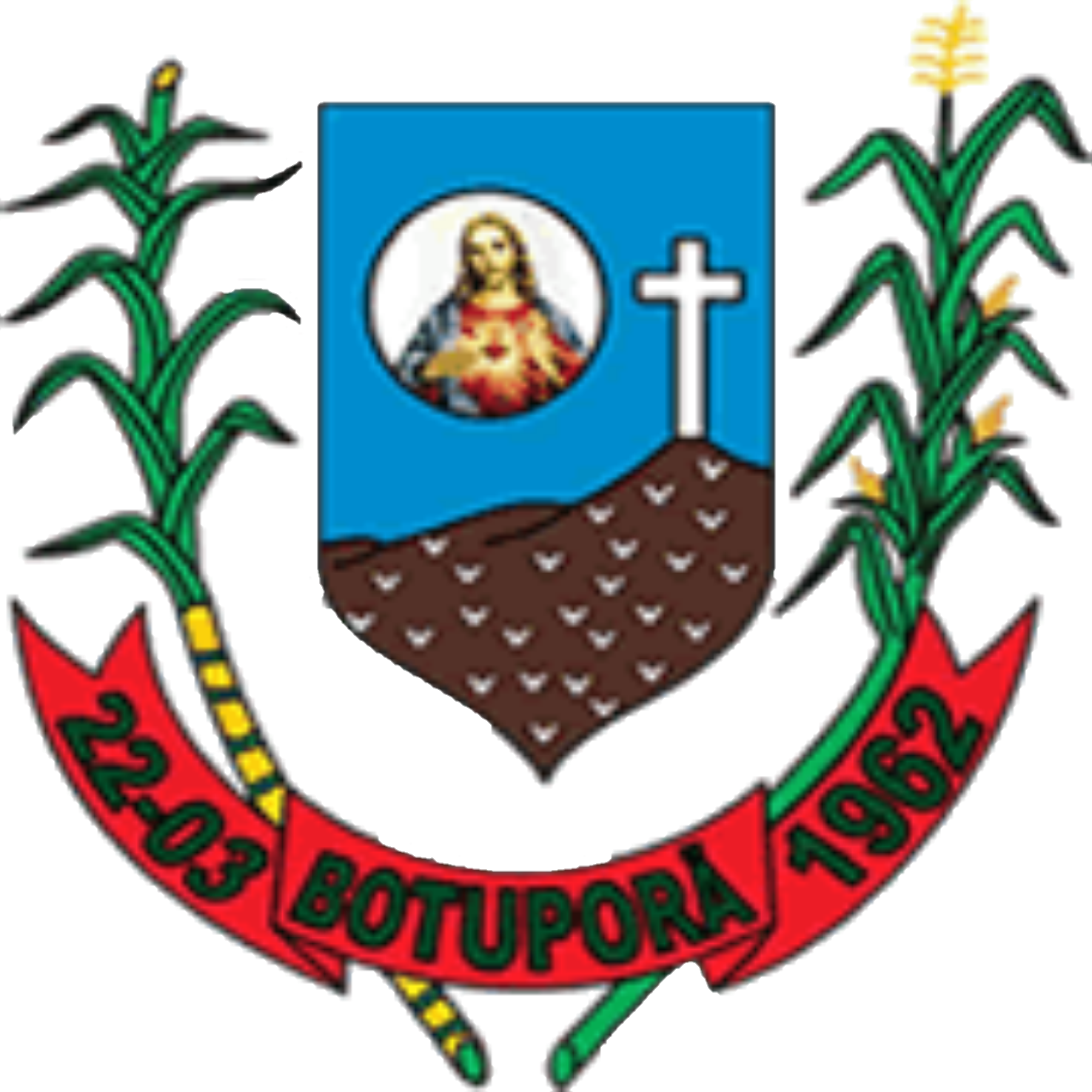
- Flag Coat of arms

- Coordinates: 13°22′55″S 42°31′22″W
- Region: Nordeste
- State: Bahia

Population (2020)
  - Total: 10,129
- Time zone: UTC−3 (BRT)
- Postal code: 2904209

Botuporã is a municipality in the state of Bahia in the North-East region of Brazil.

== See also ==
- List of municipalities in Bahia
