= Big Brother Brasil 6 =

- Season 6
- Presented by: Pedro Bial
- No. of days: 78
- No. of housemates: 14
- Winner: Mara Viana
- Runner-up: Mariana Felício
- No. of episodes: 78

Release
- Original network: Globo
- Original release: January 10 – March 28, 2006

Season chronology
- ← Previous; Big Brother Brasil 5 Next → Big Brother Brasil 7

Big Brother Brasil 6 was the sixth season of Big Brother Brasil which premiered January 10, 2006, with the season finale airing March 28, 2006, on the Rede Globo television network.

The show was produced by Endemol Globo and presented by news reporter Pedro Bial and directed by J.B Oliveira "Boninho". The prize award was R$1,000,000 without tax allowances.

The winner was 33-year-old nurse Maria Nilza "Mara" Viana from Porto Seguro, Bahia.

== General ==
There were fourteen housemates competing for the grand prize. The season lasted 78 days, a decrease of one day over the previous season. The season produced the first ever all-female Final Two and was the only season (to date) that the Final Two housemates are from the same gender.

== Housemates ==
(ages stated at time of contest)

Name	Age	Occupation	Hometown	Day entered	Day exited	Result
Mara Viana	33	Nurse	Porto Seguro	1	78	Winner
Mariana Felício	21	Model and Fisherwoman	Botucatu	1	78	Runner-up
Rafael Valente	26	Teacher	São José do Rio Preto	1	78	Third place
Agustinho Mendonça	31	Supermarket Manager	Rio de Janeiro	1	76	11th Evicted
Gustavo Aguiar	28	Former Monk	Belo Horizonte	1	71	10th Evicted
Iran Gomes	29	Composer	Rio de Janeiro	1	64	9th Evicted
Carlos Issa	28	Lawyer	São Paulo	1	57	8th Evicted
Inês Gomes	21	Student	Rio de Janeiro	1	50	7th Evicted
Thaís Macêdo	27	Psychologist	Belém do Pará	1	43	6th Evicted
Léa Ferreira	23	Motogirl	São Paulo	1	36	5th Evicted
Roberta Brasil	22	Dancer	Fortaleza	1	29	4th Evicted
Daniel Saullo	25	Model	Passa Quatro	1	22	3rd Evicted
Dan Costa	24	Assistant Coach	São Paulo	1	15	2nd Evicted
Juliana Canabarro	22	Promoter	Porto Alegre	1	8	1st Evicted

== Future appearances ==
After this season, in 2006, Mariana Felício appeared in Danca dos Famosos season 3, she finished in 9th place.

In 2010, Rafael Valente was contender to be a competitor on Big Brother Brasil 10 but ultimately did not return.

In 2019, Daniel Saullo and Mariana Felicio appeared as a couple in Power Couple Brasil 4, they finished as Runner-Up.

== Voting history ==
The voting table below records whom each housemate voted to nominate on the diary room during his or her time in the House. The Head of Household (HOH) vote (cast in front of the other housemates) automatically nominates one housemate from eviction. Then, the other housemates vote and if the vote is tied, the HOH breaks the tie (all these types of vote count for the total number of nominations received).

	Week 1	Week 2	Week 3	Week 4	Week 5	Week 6	Week 7	Week 8	Week 9	Week 10	Week 11		Nominations received
	Week 1	Week 2	Week 3	Week 4	Week 5	Week 6	Week 7	Week 8	Week 9	Week 10	Day 75	Finale	Nominations received
Head of Household	Agustinho	Inês	Inês; Iran	Iran	Agustinho	Carlos	Gustavo	Mariana	Mara	Mariana	Rafael	(none)	
Power of Immunity	Thaís	Carlos; Roberta	Thaís	Carlos	Mariana	(none)	Mara	Carlos	Gustavo	(none)		(none)	
Saved	Léa	Daniel	Roberta	Inês	Carlos	(none)	Agustinho	Iran	Mariana	(none)		(none)	
Nomination (HoH)	Juliana	Carlos	Daniel	Roberta	Léa	Thaís	Mara	Agustinho	Rafael	Agustinho	Mara	(none)	
Nomination (Housemates)	Inês	Dan	Agustinho	Rafael	Rafael	Gustavo	Inês	Carlos	Iran	Gustavo	Agustinho	(none)	
Mara	Daniel	Dan	Carlos	Rafael	Thaís	Gustavo	Rafael	Gustavo	Head of Household	Gustavo	Agustinho	Winner (Day 78)	10
Mariana	Inês	Agustinho	Rafael	Léa	Rafael	Iran	Iran	Carlos	Iran	Head of Household	Not; Eligible	Runner-up (Day 78)	3
Rafael	Dan	Dan	Thaís	Mara	Inês	Mara	Inês	Carlos	Iran	Gustavo	Head of Household	3rd place (Day 78)	13
Agustinho	Head of Household	Dan	Rafael	Léa	Head of Household	Gustavo	Inês	Carlos	Gustavo	Gustavo	Not; Eligible	Evicted (Day 76)	10
Gustavo	Thaís	Léa	Agustinho	Rafael	Rafael	Agustinho	Head of Household	Mara	Iran	Rafael	Evicted (Day 71)		10
Iran	Dan	Dan	Co-head of Household	Head of Household	Rafael	Inês	Inês	Mara	Gustavo	Evicted (Day 64)			9
Carlos	Inês	Léa	Agustinho	Thaís	Thaís	Gustavo	Inês	Rafael	Evicted (Day 57)				9
Inês	Daniel	Head of Household	Co-head of Household	Rafael	Rafael	Iran	Carlos	Evicted (Day 50)					11
Thaís	Mara	Iran	Mariana	Carlos	Inês	Mara	Evicted (Day 43)						7
Léa	Carlos	Mariana	Carlos	Mariana	Iran	Evicted (Day 36)							5
Roberta	Gustavo	Iran	Agustinho	Mara	Evicted (Day 29)								1
Daniel	Inês	Thaís	Agustinho	Evicted (Day 22)									3
Dan	Mara	Agustinho	Evicted (Day 15)										6
Juliana	Inês	Evicted (Day 8)											1
Nominated for Eviction	Inês; Juliana	Carlos; Dan	Agustinho; Daniel	Rafael; Roberta	Léa; Rafael	Gustavo; Thaís	Inês; Mara	Agustinho; Carlos	Iran; Rafael	Agustinho; Gustavo	Agustinho; Mara	Mara; Mariana; Rafael	
Evicted	Juliana; 52% to evict	Dan; 69% to evict	Daniel; 67% to evict	Roberta; 76% to evict	Léa; 71% to evict	Thaís; 57% to evict	Inês; 78% to evict	Carlos; 59% to evict	Iran; 63% to evict	Gustavo; 63% to evict	Agustinho; 52% to evict	Rafael; 19% to win	
Evicted	Juliana; 52% to evict	Dan; 69% to evict	Daniel; 67% to evict	Roberta; 76% to evict	Léa; 71% to evict	Thaís; 57% to evict	Inês; 78% to evict	Carlos; 59% to evict	Iran; 63% to evict	Gustavo; 63% to evict	Agustinho; 52% to evict	Mariana; 34% to win	
Evicted	Juliana; 52% to evict	Dan; 69% to evict	Daniel; 67% to evict	Roberta; 76% to evict	Léa; 71% to evict	Thaís; 57% to evict	Inês; 78% to evict	Carlos; 59% to evict	Iran; 63% to evict	Gustavo; 63% to evict	Agustinho; 52% to evict	Mara; 47% to win	
