= Íris Stefanelli =

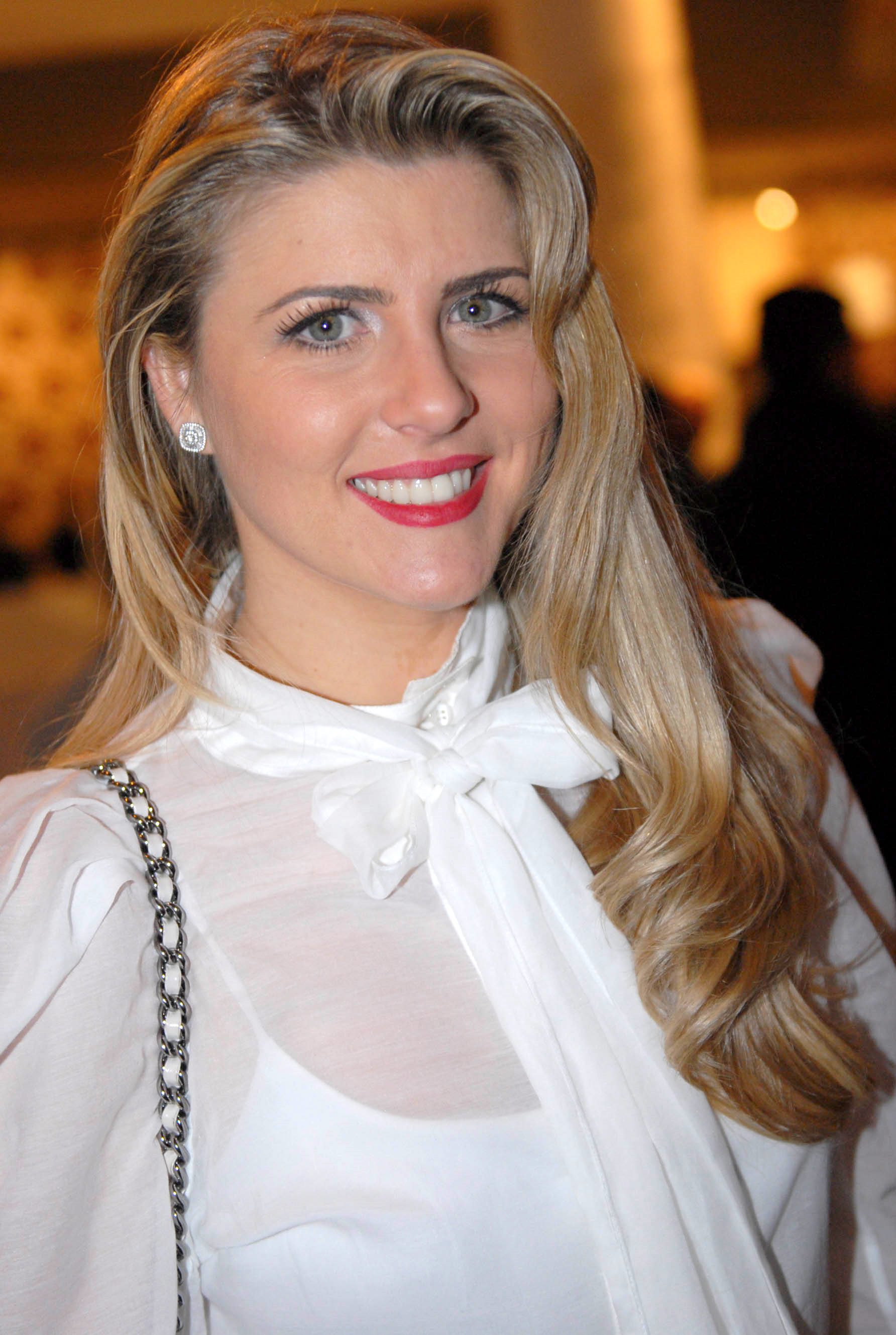
- Stefanelli in 2011
- Born: Irislene Stefanelli; July 23, 1979 (age 47); Tupã, São Paulo, Brazil
- Occupations: Actress, television presenter

Irislene Stefanelli (born July 23, 1979) is a Brazilian television personality, actress and television presenter. From March to July 2008, she worked with a co-host at Transalouca (Transamérica Pop Radio) and acted in theater. Currently, she is the host of the show TV Fama.

== Biography ==
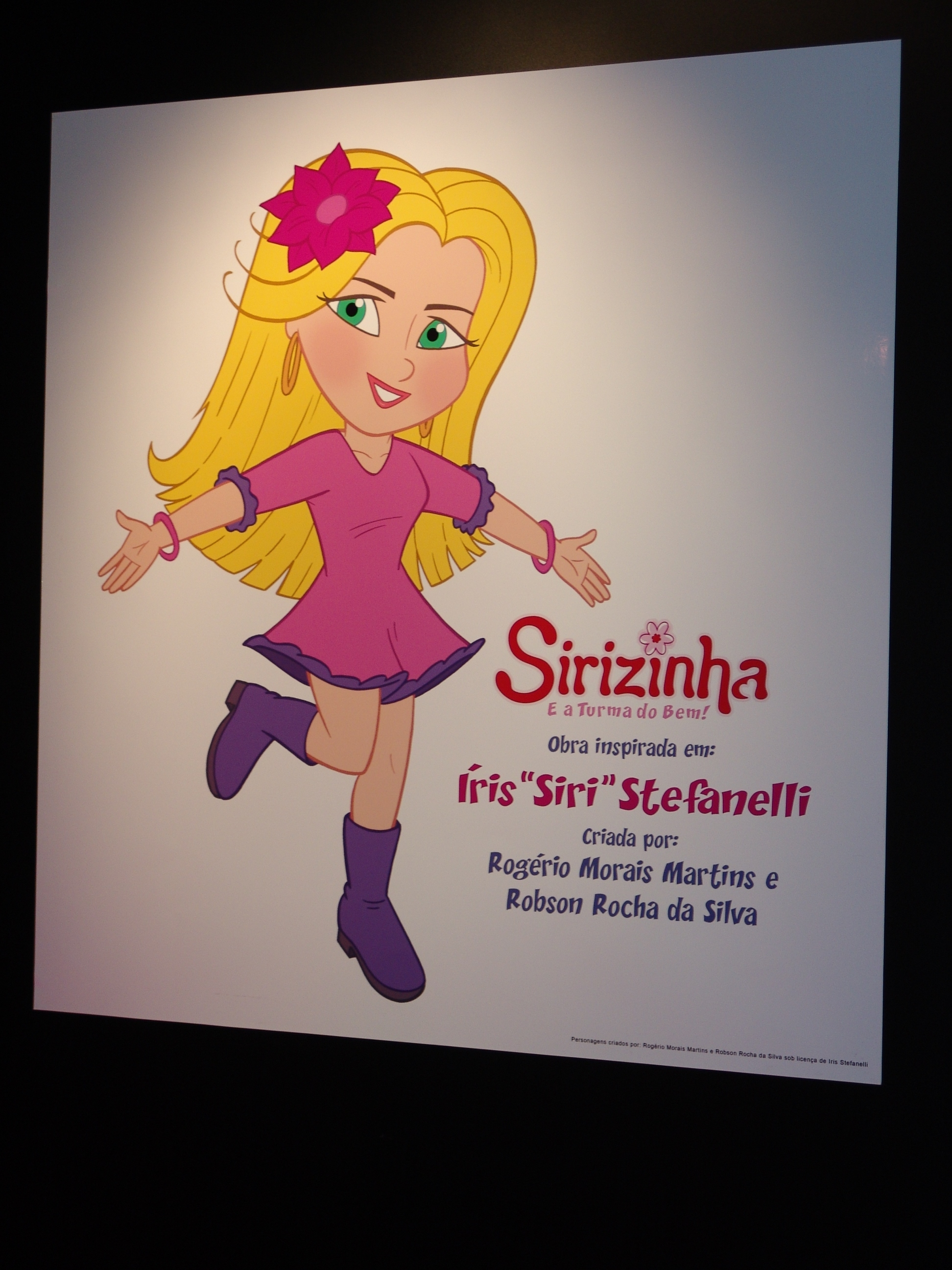
Sirizinha

Born in Tupã, a city west of São Paulo, the first child of Antonio Carlos Stefanelli and Aparecida Clarice Stefanelli, a family of scarce financial resources, Íris Stefanelli was raised in Uberlândia, Minas Gerais. Íris studied nursing at college until the next-to-last period and has worked as a saleswoman standalone to support their studies.

Her first appearance in television was in the reality show Big Brother Brazil 7th edition, from which she was eliminated in the 7th week. She had a special participation in the same reality show in Argentina. After that, she started to appear frequently in the media and won several awards. She was the cover of several magazines and was in many campaigns, in addition to attending events and parades.

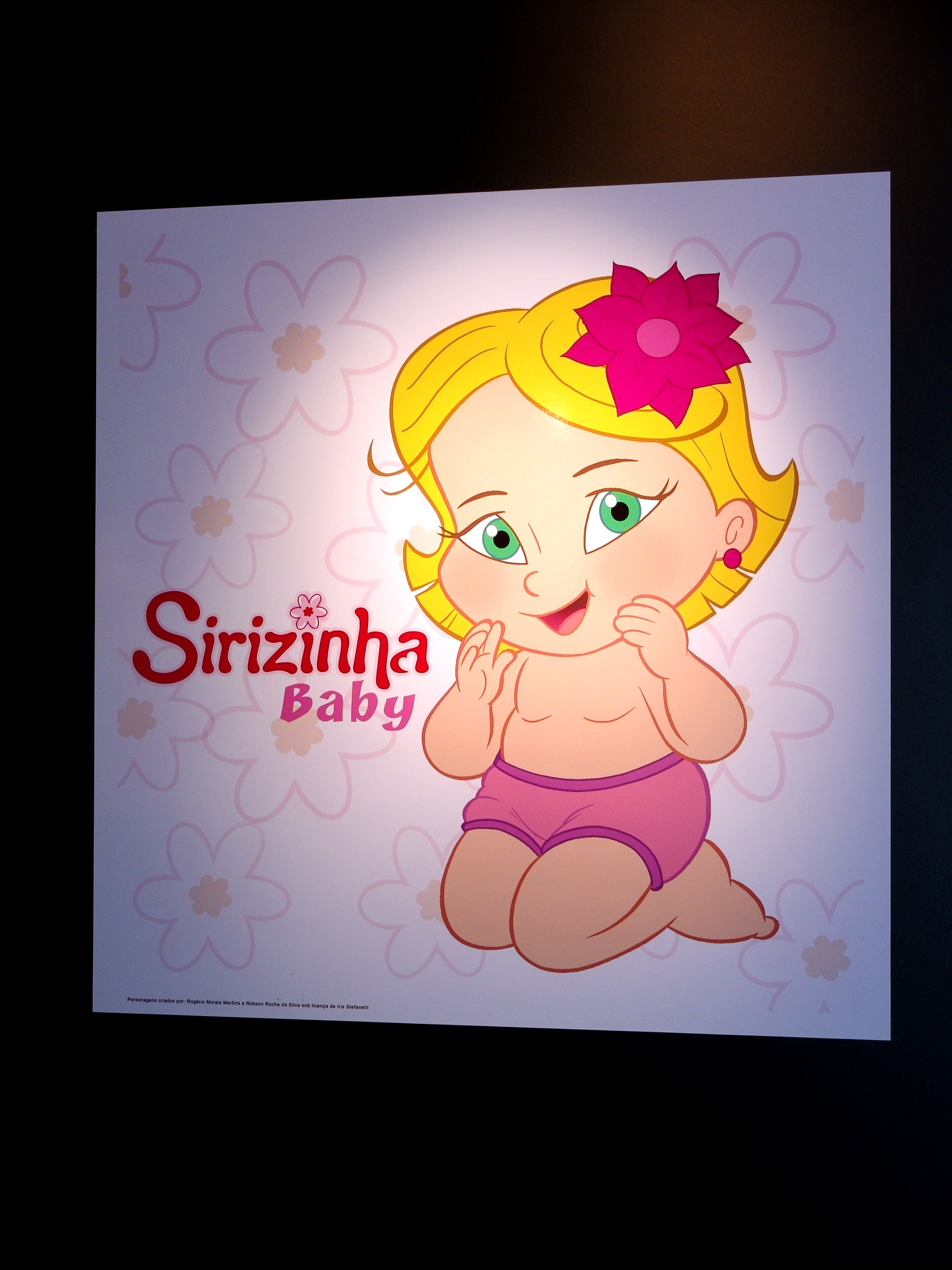
Sirizinha Baby

Stefanelli was also on the cover of the Brazilian edition of Playboy magazine, in its anniversary edition, who considers that it was the best selling edition of the magazine in 2007.

According to Jornal Extra, her website is one of the most accessed website among artists in Brazil, with 1,5 million accesses in three months.

There are two characters created after her by Rogério Martins and Robson Rocha, Sirizinha and Sirizinha Baby, dedicated to her child fans. In December 2007, Íris launched her brand of the character Sirizinha. In 2008, she started a new collection of children's clothing.

Íris worked as a blogger, the blog hosted by the IG (Blog da Íris), to comment the reality show Big Brother Brazil 8th edition. She was weighted in the comments not to influence the decisions of readers.

== Career ==
=== Television ===
After her participation in Big Brother Brazil, Íris was invited to host TV Fama, the program displays information about events with artists and celebrities, with Nelson Rubens and Adriana Lessa . Since 2007, she is one of the presenters for Rede TV!'s TV Fama.

=== Radio ===
In 2008, she was invited to co-host Transalouca, a radio show that has humor and celebrity news (Transamérica Pop Radio), where she remained until July 30.

=== Theater ===
- Hamletmachine .... Hamlet (July, 2011)
- Fear and Misery of the Third Reich (December, 2010)
- As Desgraças de uma Criança .... Madalena (June, 2010)
- The Seagull .... Polina Andryevna (December, 2009)
- A Invasão .... Malu (June, 2009)
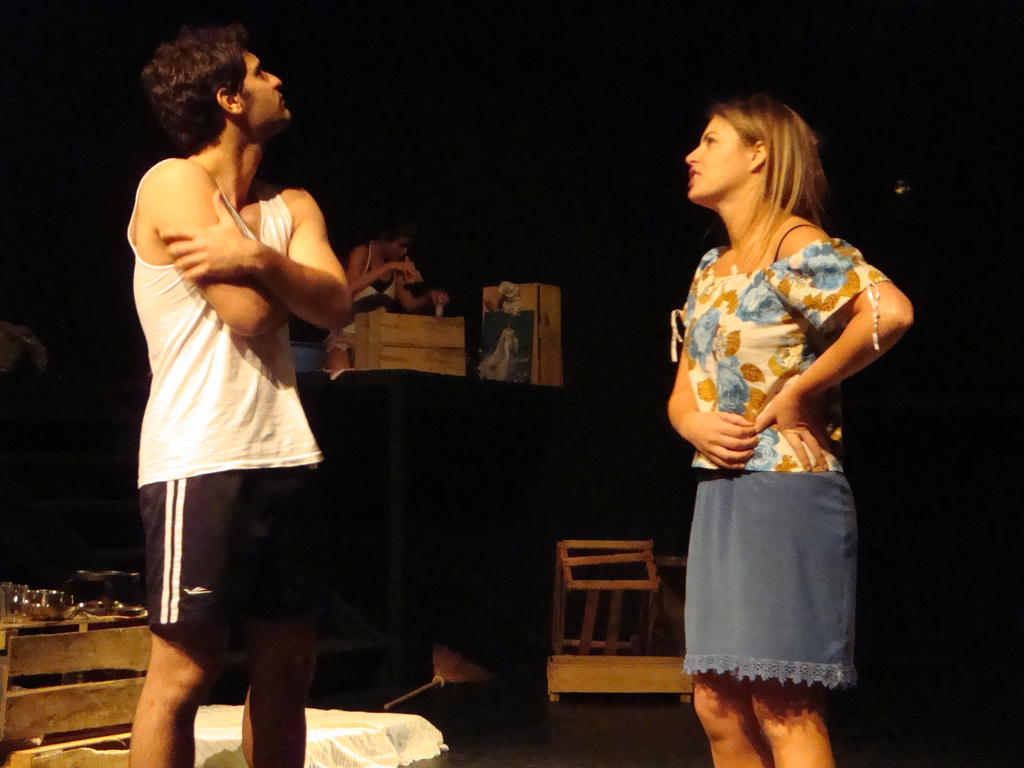
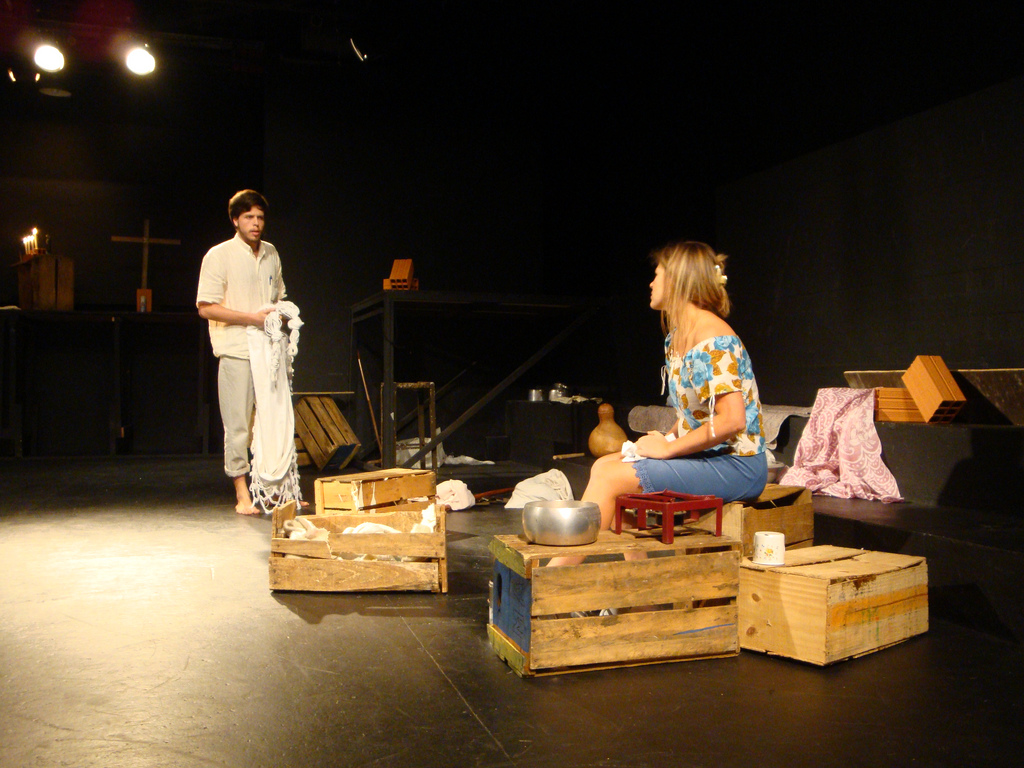
Íris Stefanelli - A Invasão

=== Magazines ===
Playboy - August, 2007

== Social work ==
• Godmother of the institution CACAU (Centro de Apoio à Criança com Anomalia Urológica).

• Opened The Campaign for Breastfeeding in 2008 in Uberlândia, Minas Gerais.

• Honored with the name of the new playroom at CACAU (Centro de Apoio à Criança com Anomalia Urológica) in October 2008.

• Christmas Event of the Instituto Cristóvão Colombo in São Paulo/2008.

• Campaign against poliomyelitis/2009.

• Participated in the 1st Expert Panel on Enuresis and voiding disorders in children of CACAU (Centro de Apoio à Criança com Anomalia Urológica) in September 2009.

• Participated in the charity event Natal do Bem in São Paulo/2009.

• Participated in the Sertanejo do Bem 2010.

• Campaign Pro-Blood in December 2010.

• Campaign RedeTV! – Direito de Viver.
