= Big Brother Brasil 4 =

- Season 4
- No. of days: 85
- No. of housemates: 14
- Winner: Cida dos Santos
- Runner-up: Thiago Lira
- No. of episodes: 85

Release
- Original network: Globo
- Original release: January 13 – April 6, 2004

Season chronology
- ← Previous; Big Brother Brasil 3 Next → Big Brother Brasil 5

Big Brother Brasil 4 was the fourth season of Big Brother Brasil which premiered January 13, 2004, with the season finale airing April 6, 2004, on the Rede Globo television network.

The show was produced by Endemol Globo and presented by news reporter Pedro Bial and directed by Jose Bonifacio Brasil de Oliveira. The prize award was R$500.000 without tax allowances.

The winner was 21-year-old nanny Gecilda "Cida" dos Santos from Mangaratiba, Rio de Janeiro. She was the first woman to win the show in Brazil.

== Overview ==
There were fourteen housemates competing for the grand prize. The season lasted 85 days, an increase of one week over the previous season. Housemates Marcela and Solange were involved in what is considered until today the worst fight in all seasons.

=== Reunion show ===
The reunion was hosted by Pedro Bial and aired on April 11, 2004. All the former housemates, attended. Cristiano ended up winning the "Big Boss Prize" which awarded a new Fiat Stilo. He won over Marcela with 70% of the fans' vote.

=== After the Show ===
Edílson Buba died in 2006 due to a stomach cancer. Juliana Lopes starred in a Rede Record's prime-time soap opera in 2007 entitled "Vidas Opostas".

== Housemates ==
(ages stated at time of contest)

Name	Age	Occupation	Hometown	Day entered	Day exited	Result
Cida dos Santos	21	Nanny	Mangaratiba	3	85	Winner
Thiago Lira	23	Assistant auditor	Rio de Janeiro	3	85	Runner-up
Juliana Lopes	23	Promoter	Brasília	1	83	12th Evicted
Solange Couto Maria	25	Attendant	Mogi Guaçu	1	78	11th Evicted
Marcela Queiroz	25	Promoter	Londrina	1	71	10th Evicted
Rogério Dragone	25	Undertaker	São Paulo	1	64	9th Evicted
Marcelo Dourado	31	P.E. teacher	Porto Alegre	1	57	8th Evicted
Zulu Gomes	23	Fighter	Niterói	1	50	7th Evicted
Edilson Buba †	32	Businessman	Curitiba	1	43	6th Evicted
Géris Leite	30	Nurse	Cajazeiras	1	36	5th Evicted
Antonela Avellaneda	21	Model	Buenos Aires, Argentina	1	29	4th Evicted
Cristiano Carnevale	29	Shopkeeper	Rio de Janeiro	1	22	3rd Evicted
Eduardo Coelho	24	Advertising	Belo Horizonte	1	15	2nd Evicted
Tatiana Giordano	21	Student	São Paulo	1	8	1st Evicted

== Future appearances ==
In 2025, Marcelo Dourado, Solange "Sol Vega" Couto and Gecilda "Cida" dos Santos appeared at the BBB: The Documentary as one of the interviewed housemates.

Housemate	Year	Future Appearance	Placements
Marcelo Dourado	2010	Big Brother Brasil 10	Winner
Marcelo Zulu	2021	No Limite 5	4th place Eliminated
Antonela Avellaneda	2021	Ilha Record 1	8th place Exiled
Solange Couto "Sol Vega"	2026	Big Brother Brasil 26	18th place Ejected

== Voting history ==
	Week 1	Week 2	Week 3	Week 4	Week 5	Week 6	Week 7	Week 8	Week 9	Week 10	Week 11	Week 12	
	Week 1	Week 2	Week 3	Week 4	Week 5	Week 6	Week 7	Week 8	Week 9	Week 10	Week 11	Day 82	Finale
Head of Household	Cristiano	Zulu	Zulu	Rogério	Marcelo	Solange	Marcelo	Juliana	Solange	Solange	Thiago	Thiago	(none)
Power of Immunity	(none)	Buba	Marcela	Thiago	Thiago	Rogério	Marcela	Solange	Marcela	Cida	(none)		(none)
Saved	(none)	Marcela	Antonela	Cida	Cida	Marcelo	Juliana	Rogério	Juliana	Thiago	(none)		(none)
Nomination (HoH)	Tatiana	Cristiano	Cristiano	Juliana	Solange	Buba	Solange	Marcelo	Marcela	Marcela	Juliana	Cida; Juliana	(none)
Nomination (Housemates)	Juliana	Eduardo	Thiago	Antonela	Géris	Juliana	Zulu	Marcela	Rogério	Juliana	Solange	Cida; Juliana	(none)
Cida	Juliana	Eduardo	Buba	Antonela	Zulu	Zulu	Zulu	Marcela	Rogério	Juliana	Not; Eligible	Nominated	Winner (Day 85)
Thiago	Antonela	Eduardo	Marcela	Antonela	Marcela	Marcela	Zulu	Marcela	Rogerio	Juliana	Head of Household	Head of Household	Runner-Up (Day 85)
Juliana	Marcela	Eduardo	Rogério	Antonela	Rogério	Zulu	Zulu	Head of Household	Rogério	Cida	Solange	Nominated	Evicted (Day 83)
Solange	Marcela	Antonela	Thiago	Antonela	Buba	Head of Household	Zulu	Marcela	Head of Household	Juliana	Not; Eligible	Evicted (Day 78)	
Marcela	Juliana	Rogério	Thiago	Solange	Juliana	Thiago	Zulu	Thiago	Rogério	Cida	Evicted (Day 71)		
Rogério	Marcela	Géris	Juliana	Head of Household	Géris	Juliana	Cida	Marcela	Cida	Evicted (Day 64)			
Marcelo	Juliana	Cida	Solange	Solange	Géris	Cida	Head of Household	Cida	Evicted (Day 57)				
Zulu	Eduardo	Head of Household	Head of Household	Thiago	Juliana	Juliana	Thiago	Evicted (Day 50)					
Buba	Marcela	Cida	Cida	Solange	Géris	Juliana	Evicted (Day 43)						
Géris	Juliana	Eduardo	Marcelo	Antonela	Zulu	Evicted (Day 36)							
Antonela	Juliana	Solange	Thiago	Solange	Evicted (Day 29)								
Cristiano	Head of Household	Marcelo	Marcelo	Evicted (Day 22)									
Eduardo	Marcela	Juliana	Evicted (Day 15)										
Tatiana	Juliana	Evicted (Day 8)											
Notes	(none)				1	(none)				2	3	4	(none)
Nominated for Eviction	Juliana; Tatiana	Cristiano; Eduardo	Cristiano; Thiago	Antonela; Juliana	Géris; Solange	Buba; Juliana	Solange; Zulu	Marcela; Marcelo	Marcela; Rogério	Juliana; Marcela	Juliana; Solange	Cida; Juliana	Cida; Thiago
Evicted	Tatiana; 62% to evict	Eduardo; 63% to evict	Cristiano; 59% to evict	Antonela; 58% to evict	Géris; 69% to evict	Buba; 66% to evict	Zulu; 80% to evict	Marcelo; 68% to evict	Rogério; 58% to evict	Marcela; 64% to evict	Solange; 79% to evict	Juliana; 60% to evict	Thiago; 31% to win
Evicted	Tatiana; 62% to evict	Eduardo; 63% to evict	Cristiano; 59% to evict	Antonela; 58% to evict	Géris; 69% to evict	Buba; 66% to evict	Zulu; 80% to evict	Marcelo; 68% to evict	Rogério; 58% to evict	Marcela; 64% to evict	Solange; 79% to evict	Juliana; 60% to evict	Cida; 69% to win

=== Notes ===
- ^Note 1: Géris, Juliana and Zulu received the most nominations with 2 each. Marcelo, as Head of Household, had the casting vote and chose Géris to be the second nominee.
- ^Note 2: Cida and Juliana received the most nominations with 2 each. Solange, as Head of Household, had the casting vote and chose Juliana to be the second nominee.
- ^Note 3: Thiago won the Head of Household and nominated Juliana for eviction. Since Cida and Solange's votes would cancel each other out, only Juliana was eligible to nominate. She chose Solange to be the second nominee.
- ^Note 4: Thiago won the final Head of Household competition. Therefore, Cida and Juliana were automatically nominated for eviction by default.
