= TV Fama =

Brazilian entertainment newsmagazine

- Genre: Variety show
- Based on: Entertainment Tonight by Al Masini
- Directed by: Fábio Martinho
- Presented by: Nelson Rubens; Flávia Noronha
- Narrated by: Danton Bohrer
- Country of origin: Brazil
- Original language: Portuguese

Production
- Production locations: Osasco, São Paulo
- Running time: 75 minutos

Original release
- Network: RedeTV!
- Release: November 15, 1999 – present

TV Fama is a weekday Brazilian entertainment newsmagazine on RedeTV! which licenses the format of the American entertainment newsmagazine Entertainment Tonight. The program is presented by Nelson Rubens and Flávia Noronha.

It is one of the oldest programs on the network. Since joining the air, TV Fama has significant average audience.

== History ==
The program began on the first day of transmission of RedeTV! (November 15, 1999), showing only parties and events. It ended up leaving the air in two weeks.

On July 17, 2000 the program returned to the air with the focus on celebrities, now licensing the imaging and branding of Entertainment Tonight from the United States, hosted by Monique Evans and Paulo Bonfá.

In 2001, the show started to be presented by Nelson Rubens and Janaína Barbosa. In 2002, Janaína was replaced by Luísa Mell, who co-presented the show with Nelson until 2006.

Íris Stefanelli and Adriana Lessa co-presented the program along with Nelson Rubens from 2007 until 2010. In May 2010, both Lessa and Rubens left the series and Íris Stefanelli became the sole presenter and continued hosting the show. In 2014, Iris Stefanelli returned to command the TV Fama, next to Nelson.Currently, the show is hosted by Nelson and Flávia Noronha, who has presents the show since 2010. Íris Stefanelli now presents another TV show in the same network, called Muito Show.

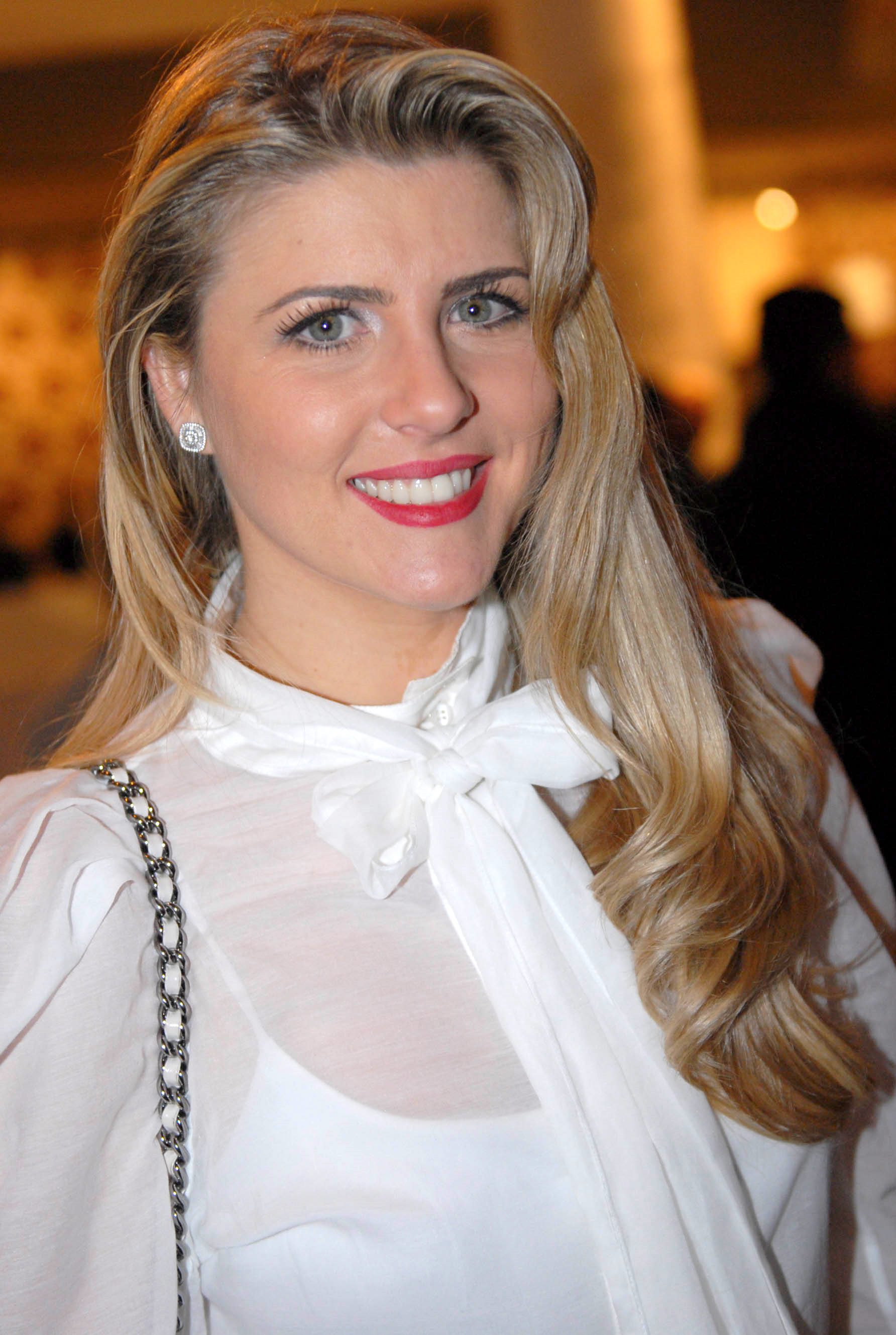
Íris Stefanelli

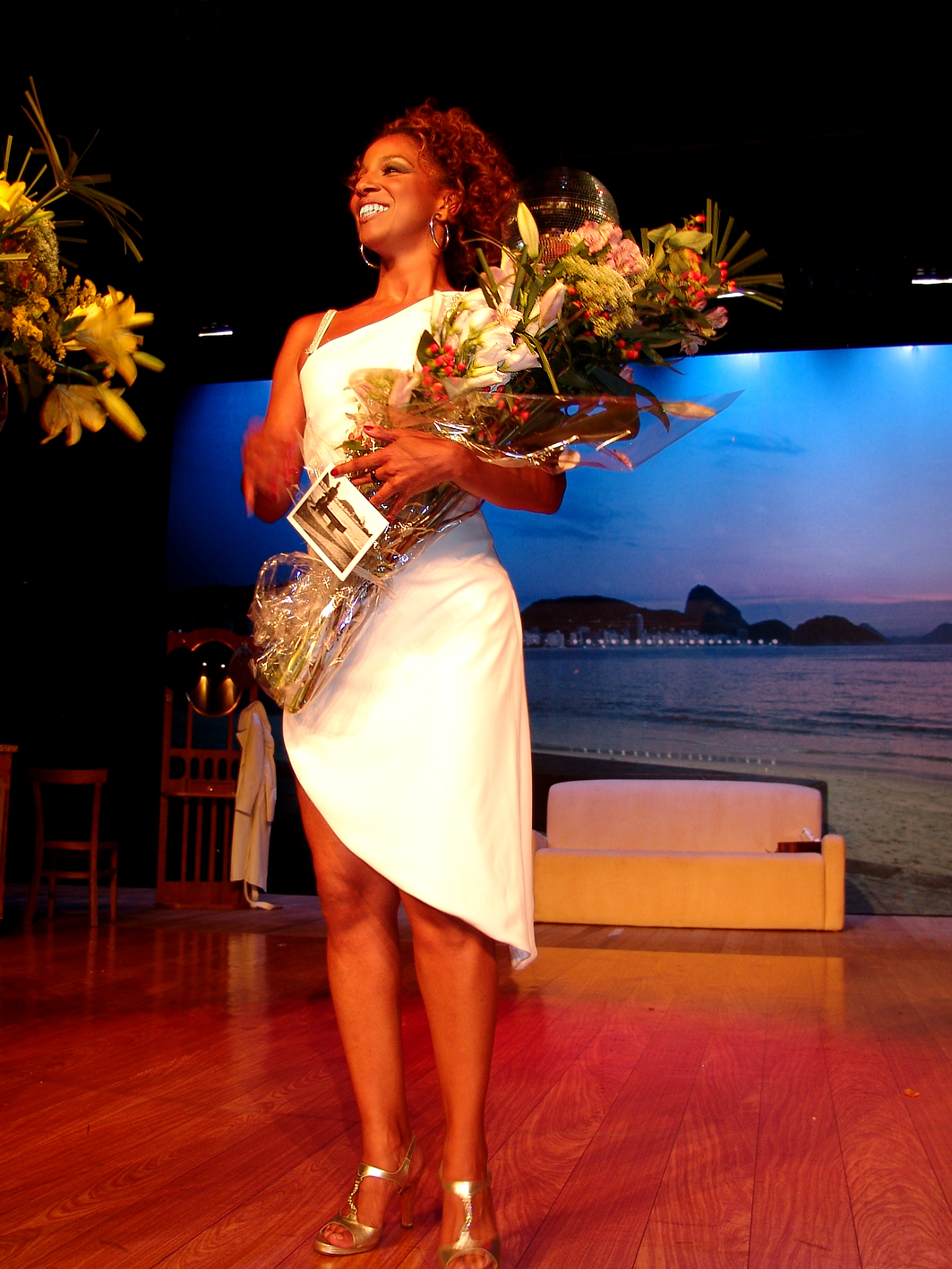
Adriana Lessa

== Regular segments ==
The program has regular feature segments;

Sketches
Avant Première
Caça Autógrafo!
Desafio da Fama
Hipnose
Íris Invasão
Notas da Fama
Olho da rua
Paparazzo
Por onde anda?
Profissão Perigo
Receitas de Cinema
Repórter Especial
Transformação
Web Repórter
