= List of De Férias com o Ex cast members =

The following is a list of cast members who have appeared in the Brazilian reality television programme De Férias com o Ex, De Férias com o Ex Caribe and De Férias com o Ex Diretoria.

== Cast ==
Maria Julia "Maju" Mazalli, Martina Sanzi and Matheus "Novinho" Crivella share the record of having appeared in all three Brazilian versions.

- **Bold** indicates original cast member; all other cast were brought into the series as an ex

Key: = Cast member returns to the beach for the second time
Key: = Cast member returns to the beach for the third time
Key: = Cast member returns to the beach for the fourth time

Season	Name	Exes
**De Férias com o Ex Brazil**
(1) 1	**Alex Merencio**	Jennifer Caivano, Keroline Tu
(1) 1	**André Coelho**	Gabriela Brandt, Gabrielle Prado
(1) 1	**Anna Clara Maia**	Guilherme Trestini
(1) 1	**Gabrieli Diniz**	Elthon Charles
(1) 1	**Guilherme "Gui" Araújo**	—N/a
(1) 1	**Héric Henrique**	Lis Aguiar
(1) 1	**Iure Meirelles**	—N/a
(1) 1	**Michelle Alveia**	—N/a
(1) 1	**Nathalia Andrade**	—N/a
(1) 1	**Raphaela Sirena**	Gabriel Lago
(1) 1	Gabriela Brandt	André Coelho
(1) 1	Guilherme Trestini	Anna Clara Maia, Sofia Zuppo
(1) 1	Gabrielle Prado	André Coelho, Luis Claudio Mós
(1) 1	Lis Aguiar	Heric Henrique
(1) 1	Jennifer Caivano	Alex Merencio
(1) 1	Gabriel Lago	Raphaela Sirena
(1) 1	Elthon Charles	Gabrieli Diniz
(1) 1	Keroline Tu	Alex Merencio
(1) 1	Luis Claudio Mós	Gabrielle Prado
(1) 1	Sofia Zuppo	Guilherme Trestini
(2) 2	**Diego Supérbi**	Scarlat Cióla
(2) 2	**Fagner Sousa**	Maria Julia, Carol Maya, Gabrielle Prado, Raissa
(2) 2	**Gabriela Domingues**	Thaigo Consani
(2) 2	**Gabrielle Prado**	Fagner Sousa, João Paulo Andrade, Thaigo Consani
(2) 2	**João Folsta**	Priscila Zoo
(2) 2	**Nicolas Guasque**	—N/a
(2) 2	**Pedro Ortega**	Andressa Santos
(2) 2	**Raissa Castro**	Paulo Rapuano, Fagner Sousa
(2) 2	**Saory Cardoso**	—N/a
(2) 2	**Stephanie Viegas**	Claudio Matos, Roy Stainsack
(2) 2	Priscila Zoo	João Folsta
(2) 2	Claudio Matos	Stephanie Viegas, Mariana Costa
(2) 2	Maria Julia Mazalli	Fagner Sousa
(2) 2	Carol Maya	Fagner Sousa
(2) 2	Paulo Rapuano	Raissa Castro
(2) 2	João Paulo Andrade	Gabrielle Prado
(2) 2	Andressa Santos	Pedro Ortega
(2) 2	Thaigo Consani	Gabriela Domingues, Gabrielle Prado
(2) 2	Scarlat Cióla	Diego Superbi
(2) 2	Mariana Costa	Claudio Matos
(2) 2	Roy Stainsack	Stephanie Viegas
(3) 3	**Any Borges**	—N/a
(3) 3	**Fernanda Mincarone**	Augusto Nogueira, Arthur Jobim
(3) 3	**Felipe Gandy**	Andressa Alves
(3) 3	**Giovana Freitas**	Fernando Lobo
(3) 3	**Igor Freitas**	Renata Dias, Daniela Seta
(3) 3	**Mauricio Miguel**	Tatiana Dias, Luiza Aragão
(3) 3	**Mylena Delatorre**	—N/a
(3) 3	**Paulo Philippe**	—N/a
(3) 3	**Vinicius Buttel**	Martina Sanzi
(3) 3	**Yasmin Burihan**	Guilherme Franciscon
(3) 3	Renata Dias	Igor Freitas, Felipe Ribeiro
(3) 3	Andressa Alves	Felipe Gandy
(3) 3	Augusto Nogueira	Fernanda Mincarone
(3) 3	Tatiana Dias	Mauricio Miguel
(3) 3	Luiza Aragão	Mauricio Miguel
(3) 3	Guilherme Franciscon	Yasmin Burihan
(3) 3	Luiz Felipe "Lipe" Ribeiro	Renata Dias
(3) 3	Daniela Seta	Igor Freitas
(3) 3	Martina Sanzi	Vinicius Buttel
(3) 3	Arthur Jobim	Fernanda Mincarone
(3) 3	Fernando Lobo	Giovana Freitas
(3) 3	Melissa Gropo	Maurício Miguel
(3) 3	Leonardo Balthazar	Tatiana Dias, Daniela Seta
(4) 4	**Bruno Mooneyhan**	Ingrid Cardoso
(4) 4	**Carlos Gopfert**	Stefani Bays
(4) 4	**Cléber Zuffo**	Fábia Calazans
(4) 4	**Gabriella Leite**	Miguel Neto, Pedro Calderari
(4) 4	**Gabriel Aglio**	Ana Carolina Andrade
(4) 4	**Guilherme Leonel**	Carolina Mattesco
(4) 4	**Jhenyfer "Bifão" Dulz**	Leonardo Xavier, Luca Colela
(4) 4	**Sarah Fonseca**	Matheus Crivella (Novinho)
(4) 4	**Tatiana Dias**	Luca Colela
(4) 4	**Yasmin Alves**	—N/a
(4) 4	Fábia Calazans	Cléber Zuffo
(4) 4	Miguel Neto	Gabriella Leite
(4) 4	Stefani Bays	Carlos Gopfert
(4) 4	Leonardo Xavier	Jhenyfer Dulz (Bifão), Karina Sousa
(4) 4	Carolina Mattesco	Guilherme Leonel
(4) 4	Pedro Calderari	Gabriella Leite, Laryssa Bottino
(4) 4	Ana Carolina Andrade	Gabriel Aglio
(4) 4	Laryssa Bottino	Pedro Calderari
(4) 4	Matheus "Novinho" Crivella	Sarah Fonseca
(4) 4	Karina Sousa	Leonardo Xavier
(4) 4	Ingrid Cardoso	Bruno Mooneyhan
(4) 4	Luca Colela	Jhenyfer Dulz (Bifão), Tatiana Dias
(5) 5	**Any Borges**	João Gabriel Brey
(5) 5	**Cinthia Cruz**	Gabriel Romano
(5) 5	**Fabio Beltrão**	—N/a
(5) 5	**Luiz Felipe "Lipe" Ribeiro**	Marcelle Casagrande, Yasmin Burihan
(5) 5	**Flavio Nakagima**	Gabrielle Fernandes
(5) 5	**Guilherme "Gui" Araújo**	Catherine Bascoy, Vitória Bellato
(5) 5	**Hana Khalil**	Bruno Toledo, Jonas Bento
(5) 5	**Leo Picon**	—N/a
(5) 5	**Rebecca "MC Rebecca" Alves**	—N/a
(5) 5	**Rafaela Porto**	—N/a
(5) 5	**Stefani Bays**	—N/a
(5) 5	**Túlio Rocha**	Mirela Janis, Catherine Bascoy
(5) 5	Mirela Janis	Túlio Rocha
(5) 5	Gabriel "Biel" Romano	Cinthia Cruz
(5) 5	Marcelle Casagrande	Lipe Ribeiro, Bruno Toledo
(5) 5	Catherine Bascoy	Gui Araújo, Túlio Rocha
(5) 5	João Gabriel Brey	Any Borges
(5) 5	Vitória Bellato	Gui Araújo, Rafael Devecz
(5) 5	Gabrielle Fernandes	Flavio Nakagima, Rodrigo Senna
(5) 5	Bruno Toledo	Hana Khalil, Marcelle Casagrande
(5) 5	Rodrigo "Digow" Senna	Gabrielle Fernandes
(5) 5	Yasmin "Yá" Burihan	Lipe Ribeiro
(5) 5	Jonas Bento	Hana Khalil
(5) 5	Rafael Devecz	Vitória Bellato
(6) 6	**Bárbara Morais**	Jarlles Gois, Arthur Muniz
(6) 6	**Caio Cabral**	Scarlat Cióla
(6) 6	**Flávia Caroline**	Victor Padula
(6) 6	**Igor Adamovich**	—N/a
(6) 6	**Jéssica Marisol**	—N/a
(6) 6	**João Hadad**	Rebecca Diniz, Larissa Cozer
(6) 6	**Matheus "Novinho" Crivella**	Camilla Costa, Scarlat Cióla
(6) 6	**Mayara Cardoso**	Natan Amorim
(6) 6	**Mina Winkel**	Diego Poggetti
(6) 6	**Rafael Vieira**	Matheus Magalhães
(6) 6	Rebecca Diniz	João Hadad
(6) 6	Diego Poggetti	Mina Winkel
(6) 6	Camilla Costa	Matheus Crivella
(6) 6	Victor Padula	Flávia Caroline
(6) 6	Jarlles Gois	Bárbara Morais
(6) 6	Scarlat Cióla	Caio Cabral, Matheus Crivella, Rafael Dutra
(6) 6	Matheus Magalhães	Rafael Vieira, Leo Lacerda
(6) 6	Natan Amorim	Mayara Cardoso
(6) 6	Larissa Cozer	João Hadad
(6) 6	Leo Lacerda	Matheus Magalhães
(6) 6	Rafael Dutra	Scarlat Cióla
(6) 6	Arthur Muniz	Bárbara Morais
(6) 6	**Caíque Gama**	Flavia Gabê
(7) 7	**Day Camargo**	—N/a
(7) 7	**Gabily**	Lincoln Lau
(7) 7	**Ingrid Ohara**	Fael
(7) 7	**Laryssa "Lary" Bottino**	Flávio Nakagima
(7) 7	**Maria Julia "Maju" Mazalli**	Bruninho
(7) 7	**Marina Gregory**	Sander Henrique
(7) 7	**Matheus Pasquarelli**	—N/a
(7) 7	**Neguin**	Bella Fernandes
(7) 7	**Pedro Ortega**	Camila Ribeiro
(7) 7	**Rico Melquiades**	Luís Mattos
(7) 7	**Tarso Brant**	Tainá Felipe
(7) 7	Flávio Nakagima	Laryssa Bottino
(7) 7	Tainá Felipe	Diego Gelio, Tarso Felipe
(7) 7	Luís Mattos	Rico Melquiades
(7) 7	Flavia Gabê	Caíque Gama
(7) 7	Bruninho	Gabi Rippi, Maju Mazalli
(7) 7	Lincoln Lau	Gabily, Letícia Escarião
(7) 7	Gabi Rippi	Bruninho
(7) 7	Fael	Ingrid Ohara
(7) 7	Camila Ribeiro	Pedro Ortega
(7) 7	Diego Gelio	Tainá Felipe
(7) 7	Bella Fernandes	Neguin
(7) 7	Sander Henrique	Marina Gregory, Ariana Rosa
(7) 7	Letícia Escarião	Lincoln Lau
(7) 7	Ariana Rosa	—N/a
**De Férias com o Ex Caribe**
Season	Name	Exes
(8) 1 Caribe	**Angietta Rodríguez**	—N/a
(8) 1 Caribe	**Camilla Costa**	João Hadad
(8) 1 Caribe	**Carlos Ortega**	Mari Azevedo, Julienne Freitas
(8) 1 Caribe	**Gabriel Sampaio**	Lua Alcântara
(8) 1 Caribe	**Haeixa Pinheiro**	Bruno Ogliari
(8) 1 Caribe	**João Vitor "Jotave" Pimentel**	Mary Magalhães
(8) 1 Caribe	**Leticia Oliveira**	Apolo Costa, Isabela Costa
(8) 1 Caribe	**Mari Franco**	Bernardo Luna
(8) 1 Caribe	**Mario Abraham**	—N/a
(8) 1 Caribe	**Vasco "Vascki" Pineda**	Bruno Damásio
(8) 1 Caribe	João Hadad	Camilla Costa
(8) 1 Caribe	Mari Azevedo	Carlos Ortega, Julio Marra
(8) 1 Caribe	Apolo Costa	Leticia Oliveira
(8) 1 Caribe	Lua Alcântara	Gabriel Sampaio
(8) 1 Caribe	Julio Marra	Mariana Azevedo
(8) 1 Caribe	Julienne Freitas	Carlos Ortega
(8) 1 Caribe	Bernardo Luna	Mariana Franco, Thaís Abelha
(8) 1 Caribe	Thaís Abelha	Bernardo Luna
(8) 1 Caribe	Bruno Damásio	Vascky Pineda
(8) 1 Caribe	Isabela "Isa" Costa	Leticia Oliveira
(8) 1 Caribe	Mariana "Mary" Magalhães	JV Pimentel
(8) 1 Caribe	Bruno Ogliari	Haeixa Pinheiro
(9) 2 Caribe	**Jhenyfer "Bifão" Dulz**	Will Guimarães
(9) 2 Caribe	**Bruno Magri**	—N/a
(9) 2 Caribe	**Gabriel Rocha**	Matheus Lisboa
(9) 2 Caribe	**Luiz Felipe "Lipe" Ribeiro**	Dessa Castorino, Vitória Guedes
(9) 2 Caribe	**Lucas Albert**	Luana Targinno
(9) 2 Caribe	**Lumena Aleluia**	—N/a
(9) 2 Caribe	**Maria Venture**	—N/a
(9) 2 Caribe	**Marina Gregory**	Mellanie Poca
(9) 2 Caribe	**Mirella**	The Boy
(9) 2 Caribe	**Willian "WL" Guimarães**	Julia Peixoto
(9) 2 Caribe	Andressa "Dessa" Castorino	Lipe Ribeiro, Sérgio Mota, Adriel de Menezes
(9) 2 Caribe	William "Will" Guimarães	Bifão
(9) 2 Caribe	Luana Targinno	Lucas Albert
(9) 2 Caribe	Sérgio Mota	Dessa Castorino
(9) 2 Caribe	Davi "The Boy" Alpiste	Mirella
(9) 2 Caribe	Adriel de Menezes	Dessa Castorino
(9) 2 Caribe	Julia Peixoto	WL, MOB
(9) 2 Caribe	Matheus Lisboa	Gabriel Rocha
(9) 2 Caribe	Marcos "MOB" Dias	Julia Peixoto
(9) 2 Caribe	Vitória Guedes	Adriel de Menezes, Lipe Ribeiro
(9) 2 Caribe	Mellanie Poca	Marina Gregory
(9) 2 Caribe	Renan Brasil	Gabriel Rocha
(10) 3 Caribe	**Aline Mineiro**	—N/a
(10) 3 Caribe	**Brenda Paixão**	João Zoli
(10) 3 Caribe	**Davi Kneip**	Duda Weide, Giovanna Menezes
(10) 3 Caribe	**Fernando Escarião**	Alan Lima
(10) 3 Caribe	**Isis Oliveira**	—N/a
(10) 3 Caribe	**João Vitor**	Mario Miguel
(10) 3 Caribe	**Kathy Maravilha**	—N/a
(10) 3 Caribe	**Lucas Vrau**	—N/a
(10) 3 Caribe	**Manoel Rafaski**	Gabriela Rossi
(10) 3 Caribe	**Markinhos**	Tay Smith, Giovanna Menezes
(10) 3 Caribe	**Tainá Felipe**	Diego Supérbi, Felipe Gabriel, Matheus Novinho
(10) 3 Caribe	**Will Domiêncio**	Deborah Costa
(10) 3 Caribe	Diego Supérbi	Tainá Felipe, Gabriela Rossi
(10) 3 Caribe	Duda Weide	Davi Kneip
(10) 3 Caribe	Alan Lima	Fernando Escarião
(10) 3 Caribe	Tay Smith	Markinhos
(10) 3 Caribe	João Zoli	Brenda Paixão
(10) 3 Caribe	Giovanna Menezes	Davi Kneip, Markinhos
(10) 3 Caribe	Mario Miguel	João Vitor
(10) 3 Caribe	Felipe Gabriel	Tainá Felipe
(10) 3 Caribe	Deborah Costa	Will Domiêncio
(10) 3 Caribe	Matheus "Novinho" Crivella	Tainá Felipe
(10) 3 Caribe	Gabriela Rossi	Diego Supérbi, Manoel Rafaski
(12) 4 Caribe	**Álec Guimel**	Pedro Daddio
(12) 4 Caribe	**André Pereira**	Carla Faria
(12) 4 Caribe	**Aryan Almeida**	Victoria Macan
(12) 4 Caribe	**Clau**	Marrom
(12) 4 Caribe	**Cristal Félix**	—N/a
(12) 4 Caribe	**Manoel Rafaski**	Juliana Araújo
(12) 4 Caribe	**Laís Melo**	Yuri Palheiros
(12) 4 Caribe	**Martina Sanzi**	—N/a
(12) 4 Caribe	**Matheus Freire**	Rico Melquiades
(12) 4 Caribe	**Natália Deodato**	—N/a
(12) 4 Caribe	**Nizam Hayek**	Fabi Rodrigues
(12) 4 Caribe	**Polidoro Jr**	—N/a
(12) 4 Caribe	Fabi Rodrigues	Nizam Hayek, Kalil Zarif
(12) 4 Caribe	Marrom	Clau, Thasol
(12) 4 Caribe	Carla Faria	André Pereira, Kaduh
(12) 4 Caribe	Kalil Zarif	Fabi Rodrigues
(12) 4 Caribe	Pedro Daddio	Álec Guimel
(12) 4 Caribe	Victoria Macan	Aryan Almeida
(12) 4 Caribe	Kaduh	Carla Faria
(12) 4 Caribe	Thasol	Marron
(12) 4 Caribe	Yuri Palheiros	Laís Melo
(12) 4 Caribe	Juliana "Lika" Araújo	Manoel Rafaski, João Victor Liberato
(12) 4 Caribe	Rico Melquiades	Matheus Freire
(12) 4 Caribe	João Victor Liberato	Juliana Araújo
**De Férias com o Ex Diretoria**
Season	Name	Exes
(11) 1 Diretoria	**Cléber Zuffo**	—N/a
(11) 1 Diretoria	**Fagner Sousa**	—N/a
(11) 1 Diretoria	**Fernando Escarião**	Juliana Araújo
(11) 1 Diretoria	**Flávio Nakagima**	Carolina Bueno
(11) 1 Diretoria	**Igor Freitas**	Nina Pereira
(11) 1 Diretoria	**Lis Aguiar**	Valmir Wanderley, Geraldo Souto
(11) 1 Diretoria	**Luís Mattos**	Apolo Costa, Alan Rissato
(11) 1 Diretoria	**Lumena Aleluia**	—N/a
(11) 1 Diretoria	**Maria Julia "Maju" Mazalli**	—N/a
(11) 1 Diretoria	**Martina Sanzi**	Ian Barcellos, Valmir Wanderley
(11) 1 Diretoria	**Stéfani Bays**	Valmir Wanderley
(11) 1 Diretoria	**Vinicius "Vini" Büttel**	Ana Witcel
(11) 1 Diretoria	Ian Barcellos	Martina Sanzi
(11) 1 Diretoria	Carolina "Carol" Bueno	Flávio Nakagima
(11) 1 Diretoria	Apolo Costa	Luís Mattos
(11) 1 Diretoria	Valmir Wanderley	Lis Aguiar, Martina Sanzi, Stéfani Bays, Raquel Trindade
(11) 1 Diretoria	Geraldo "Geraldinho" Souto	Lis Aguiar
(11) 1 Diretoria	Juliana "Lika" Araújo	Fagner Sousa
(11) 1 Diretoria	Raquel Trindade	Valmir Wanderley
(11) 1 Diretoria	Nina Pereira	Igor Freitas, Robson Junior
(11) 1 Diretoria	Robson "Robinho" Junior	Nina Pereira
(11) 1 Diretoria	Ana Witcel	Vinicius Büttel
(11) 1 Diretoria	Alan Rissato	Luís Mattos
(13) 2 Diretoria	**Aline Mineiro**	—N/a
(13) 2 Diretoria	**Carla Faria**	Leo Alcy, André Pereira
(13) 2 Diretoria	**Cléber Zuffo**	Victoria Gralha
(13) 2 Diretoria	**Elthon "Don Charles" Charles**	—N/a
(13) 2 Diretoria	**Fernando Escarião**	Yuri Costa
(13) 2 Diretoria	**Léo Lacerda**	Yuri Costa, Richard Biglia
(13) 2 Diretoria	**Lumena Aleluia**	—N/a
(13) 2 Diretoria	**Mayara Cardoso**	Leo Alcy
(13) 2 Diretoria	**Matheus "Novinho" Crivella**	Cristal Félix, Julian Souza
(13) 2 Diretoria	**Nizam Hayek**	Giogio Araújo
(13) 2 Diretoria	**Rebecca Alves**	Leo Alcy, Lucas Ranhol
(13) 2 Diretoria	**Willian "WL" Guimarães**	—N/a
(13) 2 Diretoria	Leo Alcy	Carla Faria, Mayara Cardoso, Rebecca Alves
(13) 2 Diretoria	Giogio Araújo	Nizam Hayek, Bruno Toledo, Lucas Ranhol
(13) 2 Diretoria	Cristal Félix	Matheus Crivella, Guilherme Evaristo, André Pereira
(13) 2 Diretoria	Bruno Borba Toledo	Giogio Araújo, Eduarda Borges
(13) 2 Diretoria	Yuri Costa	Fernando Escarião, Léo Lacerda
(13) 2 Diretoria	Eduarda Borges	Bruno Toledo
(13) 2 Diretoria	Guilherme Evaristo (Gui)	Cristal Félix
(13) 2 Diretoria	André Pereira	Carla Faria, Cristal Félix
(13) 2 Diretoria	Lucas Ranhol	Giogio Araújo, Rebecca Alves
(13) 2 Diretoria	Julian Souza	Matheus Crivella
(13) 2 Diretoria	Richard Biglia	Léo Lacerda
(13) 2 Diretoria	Victoria Gralha	Cléber Zuffo

== Other appearances ==
In addition to appearing on De Férias com o Ex, some of the cast members went on to compete in other reality TV shows.

- A Fazenda (The Farm)

Cast Member	Season	Result	Finish
Gabi Prado; Seasons 1 & 2	10	Eliminated 6th	11th
Tati Dias; Seasons 3 & 4	11	Eliminated 4th	13th
Jhenyfer "Bifão" Dulz; Season 4	11	Eliminated 6th	11th
Lipe Ribeiro; Seasons 3 & 5	12	Fourth place	4th
Stéfani Bays; Seasons 4 & 5	12	Third place	3rd
Lary Bottino; Seasons 4 & 7	13	Eliminated 5th	16th
Gui Araujo; Seasons 1 & 5	13	Eliminated 10th	11th
Rico Melquiades; Season 7	13	Winner	1st
Ingrid Ohara; Season 7	14	Eliminated 2nd	20th
Vini Büttel; Season 3	14	Eliminated 6th	14th
Igor Freitas; Season 3	15	Not Selected	23rd
Lumena Aleluia; Season 9	15	Not Selected	28th
Willian "WL" Guimarães; Season 9	15	Fourth place	4th
Gabriela Rossi; Season 10	16	Not Selected	28th
Luana Targinno; Season 9	16	Eliminated 12th	10th
Nizam Hayek	17	Eliminated 5th	21th

- Ilha Record (Record Island)

Cast Member	Season	Result	Finish
Claudinho Matos; Season 2	1	4th Exiled	12th
Any Borges; Seasons 3 & 5	1	Winner	1st
Vitória Bellato; Season 5	2	1st Exiled	13th
Ste Viegas; Season 2	2	14th Exiled	3rd
Flávio Nakagima; Seasons 5 & 7	2	Winner	1st

- Power Couple

Cast Member	Season	Result	Finish
André Coelho; Season 1	4	Third place	3rd
Anna Clara Maia; Season 1	4	Third place	3rd
Mirela Janis; Season 5	5	Eliminated 6th	8th
João Hadad; Season 6	6	Eliminated 9th	4th
Diego Supérbi; Season 2 & 10	7	Eliminated 1st	14th
Giovanna Menezes; Season 10	7	Eliminated 1st	14th

- The Challenge

Cast Member	Season	Result	Finish
João Paulo "JP" Andrade; Season 2	33	Eliminated 4th	25th
