= De Férias com o Ex Caribe season 3 =

Season of television series

De Férias com o Ex Caribe: Salseiro VIP 2
- Season 3
- No. of days: 24
- No. of housemates: 23
- Location: Isla Barú, Colombia
- No. of episodes: 13

Release
- Original network: MTV Brazil; Paramount+
- Original release: October 19, 2023 – January 11, 2024

Additional information
- Filming dates: June 1 – June 24, 2023

Season chronology
- ← Previous; Season 2 Next → Season 4

The third season of the De Férias com o Ex Caribe, also known as De Férias com o Ex Caribe: Salseiro VIP 2, which premiered on Thursday, October 19, 2023, on MTV. It features twelve celebrity singles living together on Isla Barú, Colombia with their ex-partners.

== Cast ==
The list of celebrity cast members was released on September 19, 2023. They include five women; Aline Mineiro (A Fazenda 13), Brenda Paixão (Too Hot to Handle: Brazil 1 and Power Couple Brasil 6), Isis Oliveira, Kathy Maravilha and Tainá Felipe (De Férias com o Ex Celebs 2), and seven men; Davi Kneip ( Too Hot to Handle: Brazil 1), Fernando Escarião, João Vitor, Lucas Vrau, Manoel Rafaski (Big Brother Brasil 17), Markinhos and Will Domiêncio (Love Is Blind: Brazil 2).

Notable exes include Diego Supérbi (De Férias com o Ex 2), João Zoli (A Fazenda 10) and Matheus Novinho (De Férias com o Ex 4 and 6 and Rio Shore).

- **Bold** indicates original cast member; all other cast were brought into the series as an ex.

Episodes	Cast member	Age	Notability	Exes
13	**Aline Mineiro**	31	Actress	—N/a
13	**Brenda Paixão**	26	Too Hot to Handle: Brazil 1	João Zoli
13	**Davi Kneip**	23	Too Hot to Handle: Brazil 1	Duda, Giovanna
13	**Fernando Escarião**	30	YouTuber	Alan
13	**Isis Oliveira**	28	Dancer	—N/a
13	**João Vitor**	22	Digital influencer	Mario
13	**Kathy Maravilha**	30	DJ	—N/a
13	**Lucas Vrau**	25	Digital influencer	—N/a
13	**Manoel Rafaski**	29	Big Brother Brasil 17	Gabriela
13	**Markinhos**	30	Digital influencer	Tay, Giovanna
13	**Tainá Felipe**	26	De Férias com o Ex: Celebs 2	Diego, Felipe, Matheus
13	**Will Domiêncio**	26	Love Is Blind: Brazil 2	Deborah Costa
13	Diego Supérbi	29	De Férias com o Ex 2	Tainá, Gabriela
12	Duda Weide	22	Digital influencer	Davi
10	Alan Lima	34	Doctor	Escarião
10	Tay Smith	26	Dancer	Markinhos
5	João Zoli	30	A Fazenda 10	Brenda
8	Giovanna Menezes	23	Digital influencer	Davi, Markinhos
7	Mario Miguel	22	Digital influencer	João Vitor
5	Felipe Gabriel	28	Digital influencer	Tainá
4	Deborah Costa	27	Model	Will
3	Matheus Novinho	31	De Férias com o Ex 4	Tainá
2	Gabriela Rossi	28	Digital influencer	Diego, Manoel

== Future appearances ==
In 2024, Gabriela Rossi appeared on A Grande Conquista 2 and A Fazenda 16, but did not advance in either show. In A Grande Conquista 2, she was eliminated during the Villa phase. In A Fazenda 16, she entered the Warehouse but was not voted by the public to join the main house.

In 2024, Fernando Escarião appeared for the first season of De Férias com o Ex Diretoria. In 2026 returned for a second season of De Férias com o Ex Diretoria.

In 2025, Diego Supérbi and Giovanna Menezes appeared as a couple in Power Couple Brasil 7, where they were the first couple eliminated, finishing in 14th place.

In 2026, Aline Mineiro returned for the second season of De Férias com o Ex Diretoria.

== Duration of cast ==
Cast members	Episodes												
Cast members	1	2	3	4	5	6	7	8	9	10	11	12	13
Aline													
Brenda													
Davi													
Escarião													
Isis													
João Vitor													
Kathy													
Lucas													
Manoel													
Markinhos													
Tainá													
Will													
Diego													
Duda													
Alan													
Tay													
João Zoli													
Giovanna													
Mario													
Felipe													
Deborah													
Novinho													
Gabriela													

Key
Cast member is featured in this episode
Cast member arrives on the beach
Cast member has an ex arrive on the beach
Cast member arrives on the beach and has an ex arrive during the same episode
Cast member leaves the beach
Cast member does not feature in this episode

== Episodes ==
No. overall	No. in season	Title	Original release date
25	1	"Episode 1"	October 19, 2023
26	2	"Episode 2"	October 26, 2023
27	3	"Episode 3"	November 2, 2023
28	4	"Episode 4"	November 9, 2023
29	5	"Episode 5"	November 16, 2023
30	6	"Episode 6"	November 23, 2023
31	7	"Episode 7"	November 30, 2023
32	8	"Episode 8"	December 7, 2023
33	9	"Episode 9"	December 14, 2023
34	10	"Episode 10"	December 21, 2023
35	11	"Episode 11"	December 28, 2023
36	12	"Episode 12"	January 4, 2024
37	13	"Episode 13"	January 11, 2024
