= De Férias com o Ex Caribe season 4 =

Season of television series

De Férias com o Ex Caribe VIP
- Season 4
- No. of days: 24
- No. of housemates: 24
- Location: Isla Barú, Colombia
- No. of episodes: 13

Release
- Original network: MTV Brazil; Paramount+
- Original release: May 22 – August 7, 2025

Additional information
- Filming dates: August 28 – September 21, 2024

Season chronology
- ← Previous; Season 3

The fourth season of the De Férias com o Ex Caribe, also known as De Férias com o Ex Caribe VIP premiered on May 22, 2025, on MTV. It features twelve celebrity singles living together on Isla Barú, Colombia with their ex-partners.

== Cast ==
The original cast members were revealed by MTV on April 24, 2025. It features five single women : Clau, Cristal Félix, Laís Melo, Martina Sanzi (De Férias com o Ex 3 and De Férias com o Ex Diretoria) and Natália Deodato, and seven men: Álec Guimel, André Pereira, Aryan Almeida, Manoel Rafaski (De Férias com o Ex Caribe 3), Polidoro Jr., Matheus Freire and Nizam Hayek.

- **Bold** indicates original cast member; all other cast were brought into the series as an ex.

Episodes	Cast member	Age	Notability	Exes
13	**Álec Guimel**	22	Digital influencer	Pedro
13	**André Pereira**	30	Soccer player	Carla
11	**Aryan Almeida**	23	Digital influencer	Victoria
13	**Clau**	28	Singer	Marrom
13	**Cristal Félix**	31	Rio Shore	—N/a
13	**Laís Melo**	25	Digital influencer	Yuri
13	**Manoel Rafaski**	31	Big Brother Brasil 17	Lika
13	**Martina Sanzi**	31	De Férias com o Ex 3	—N/a
13	**Matheus Freire**	25	Digital influencer	Rico
13	**Natália Deodato**	24	Big Brother Brasil 22	—N/a
13	**Nizam Hayek**	33	Big Brother Brasi 24	Fabi
13	**Polidoro Jr.**	28	Soccer player	—N/a
13	Fabi Rodrigues	29	Digital influencer	Nizam, Kalil
12	Marrom	30	—N/a	Clau, Thasol
11	Carla Faria	27	—N/a	André, Kaduh
10	Kalil Zarif	32	—N/a	Fabi
9	Pedro Daddio	25	Digital influencer	Álec
8	Victoria Macan	28	Too Hot to Handle: Brazil 2	Aryan
7	Kaduh	29	—N/a	Carla
6	Thasol	31	—N/a	Marrom
5	Yuri Palheiros	36	—N/a	Laís
4	Juliana "Lika" Araújo	29	De Férias com o Ex Diretoria	Manoel, Liberato
3	Rico Melquiades	34	De Férias com o Ex: Celebs 2	Matheus
2	João Victor Liberato	28	—N/a	Lika

== Future Appearances ==
In 2025. Nizam Hayek entered A Fazenda 17, where, after 40 days, he was eliminated in 21st place. In 2026, appeared for the second season of De Férias com o Ex Diretoria.

In 2026, André Pereira and Carla Faria returned for the second season of De Férias com o Ex Diretoria.

== Duration of cast ==
Cast members	Episodes												
Cast members	1	2	3	4	5	6	7	8	9	10	11	12	13
Álec													
André													
Aryan													
Clau													
Cristal													
Laís													
Manoel													
Martina													
Matheus													
Natália													
Nizam													
Polidoro													
Fabi													
Marrom													
Carla													
Kalil													
Pedro													
Macan													
Kaduh													
Thasol													
Yuri													
Lika													
Rico													
Liberato													

Key
Cast member is featured in this episode
Cast member arrives on the beach
Cast member has an ex arrive on the beach
Cast member arrives on the beach and has an ex arrive during the same episode
Cast member leaves the beach
Cast member does not feature in this episode

== Episodes ==
No. overall	No. in season	Title	Original release date
38	1	"Episode 1"	May 22, 2025
39	2	"Episode 2"	May 22, 2025
40	3	"Episode 3"	May 29, 2025
41	4	"Episode 4"	June 5, 2025
42	5	"Episode 5"	June 12, 2025
43	6	"Episode 6"	June 19, 2025
44	7	"Episode 7"	June 26, 2025
45	8	"Episode 8"	July 3, 2025
46	9	"Episode 9"	July 10, 2025
47	10	"Episode 10"	July 17, 2025
48	11	"Episode 11"	July 24, 2025
49	12	"Episode 12"	July 31, 2025
50	13	"Episode 13"	August 7, 2025
