= De Férias com o Ex Diretoria season 2 =

De Férias com o Ex Diretoria
- Season 2
- Winner: Matheus Crivella
- Location: Pipa Beach, Rio Grande do Norte
- No. of episodes: 13

Release
- Original network: Paramount+
- Original release: May 28 – August 13, 2026

Additional information
- Filming dates: August 14 – September 6, 2025

Season chronology
- ← Previous; Season 1

The second season of De Férias com o Ex Diretoria premiered worldwide on May 28, 2026, on Paramount+. It is the first season of any of the Brazilian versions of Ex on the Beach not to air on MTV, following the channel's closure.

It follows the format of the previous season, with a R$100,000 prize awarded to the cast member voted the season's best "ex", who would also be named the season's CEO.

The season was filmed in Praia de Pipa, Rio Grande do Norte, at the same location where the first season of De Férias com o Ex was filmed, marking a return to where the franchise began in 2016.

== Cast ==
The list of 12 original cast members was revealed on May 7, 2026. The cast consists of seven single men: Cléber Zuffo, Don Charles, Fernando Escarião, Leo Lacerda, Matheus "Novinho" Crivella, Nizam Hayek and WL Guimarães; and five single women: Aline Mineiro, Carla Faria, Lumena Aleluia, Mayara Cardoso and Rebecca. The remaining cast members joined the season later as exes.

Novinho is the cast member with the most appearances, having participated in all three Brazilian versions, being the first to appear in four seasons. Cléber, Escarião and Lumena returned as cast members from the first season of De Férias com o Ex Diretoria, with the latter having won the season and returning to defend her title. Nizam filmed this season in 2025 and subsequently participated in A Fazenda 17 before this season premiered.

- **Bold** indicates original cast member; all other cast were brought into the series as an ex.

Episodes	Name	Notability	Exes
13	**Aline Mineiro**	De Férias Caribe 3	—N/a
13	**Carla Faria**	De Férias Caribe 4	Leo A, André
13	**Cléber Zuffo**	De Férias 4 & Diretoria 1	Victoria
13	**Elthon Charles (Don Charles)**	De Férias 1	—N/a
13	**Fernando Escarião**	De Férias Caribe 3 & Diretoria 1	Yuri
13	**Léo Lacerda**	De Férias 6	Yuri, Richard
13	**Lumena Aleluia**	Big Brother Brasil 21	—N/a
4	**Mayara Cardoso**	De Férias 6	Leo A
13	**Matheus Crivella (Novinho)**	De Férias 4, De Férias 6 & Caribe 3	Cristal, Julian
10	**Nizam Hayek**	Big Brother Brasi 24	Giogio
13	**Rebecca**	De Férias Celebs	Leo A, Lucas
13	**Willian Guimarães** **(WL)**	De Férias Caribe 2	—N/a
12	Leo Alcy	Soltos no Carnaval	Carla, Mayara, Rebecca
11	Giogio Araújo	—N/a	Nizam, Bruno, Lucas
10	Cristal Félix	Rio Shore	Novinho, Guilherme, André
9	Bruno Toledo	Actor	Giogio, Eduarda
8	Yuri Costa	—N/a	Léo L, Escarião
7	Eduarda Borges	—N/a	Bruno Toledo
6	Guilherme Evaristo (Gui)	Rio Shore	Cristal
5	André Pereira	De Férias Caribe 4	Carla, Cristal
5	Lucas Ranhol	—N/a	Giogio, Rebecca
4	Julian Souza	—N/a	Novinho
3	Richard Biglia	—N/a	Léo L
2	Victoria Gralha	—N/a	Cléber

=== Duration of cast ===
Cast members	Episodes												
Cast members	1	2	3	4	5	6	7	8	9	10	11	12	13
Aline													
Carla													
Cléber													
Don Charles													
Escarião													
Léo L													
Lumena													
Mayara													
Novinho													
Nizam													
Rebecca													
WL													
Leo A													
Giogio													
Cristal													
Bruno													
Yuri													
Eduarda													
Gui													
André													
Lucas													
Julian													
Richard													
Victoria													

Key
Cast member is featured in this episode
Cast member arrives on the beach
Cast member has an ex arrive on the beach
Cast member leaves the beach
Cast member does not feature in this episode

== Voting history ==
This season, only five cast members were eligible to become CEO through activities held throughout the season: Carla, Escarião, Lumena, Novinho and Rebecca. The cast members present in the house during the final episode could only vote for one of them, while the eligible cast members could not vote for themselves. During the on-location reunion, guest host Lipe Ribeiro, a former cast member of De Férias com o Ex season 3, De Férias: Celebs and Caribe season 2, announced that Novinho won the vote, becoming the season's CEO and winning the R$100,000 prize.

Finalists	Novinho	Lumena	Carla	Rebecca
Votes	undisclosed			
Voter	Vote			
Aline		Yes		
André	undisclosed			
Bruno	undisclosed			
Carla	Yes			
Cléber			Yes	
Cristal	undisclosed			
Don Charles	undisclosed			
Eduarda		Yes		
Escarião	Yes			
Giogio			Yes	
Gui	undisclosed			
Julian	undisclosed			
Leo A	Yes			
Léo L	undisclosed			
Lumena				Yes
Novinho			Yes	
Rebecca		Yes		
Richard		Yes		
Victoria	undisclosed			
WL	Yes			
Yuri	Yes			

== Episodes ==
No. overall	No. in season	Title	Original release date
14	1	"Episode 1"	May 28, 2026
15	2	"Episode 2"	May 28, 2026
16	3	"Episode 3"	June 4, 2026
17	4	"Episode 4"	June 11, 2026
18	5	"Episode 5"	June 18, 2026
19	6	"Episode 6"	June 25, 2026
20	7	"Episode 7"	July 2, 2026
21	8	"Episode 8"	July 9, 2026
22	9	"Episode 9"	July 16, 2026
23	10	"Episode 10"	July 23, 2026
24	11	"Episode 11"	July 30, 2026
25	12	"Episode 12"	August 6, 2026
26	13	"Episode 13"	August 13, 2026
