= De Férias com o Ex Diretoria season 1 =

De Férias com o Ex Diretoria
- Season 1
- Winner: Lumena Aleluia
- Location: Maragogi, Alagoas
- No. of episodes: 13

Release
- Original network: MTV; Paramount+
- Original release: June 6 – August 22, 2024

Additional information
- Filming dates: November 2 – November 24, 2023

Season chronology
- Next → Season 2

The first season of De Férias com o Ex: Diretoria premiered on June 6, 2024.

For the first time in the Brazilian franchise, a R$100,000 cash prize was introduced. The cast member voted the season's best "ex" would win the prize and be named the season's CEO.

The season features only former cast members of the De Férias com o Ex franchise as part of the original cast, including the Celebs seasons and the spin-off De Férias com o Ex Caribe. The season was filmed in Maragogi, Alagoas.

== Cast ==
The list of 12 original cast members was revealed on April 18, 2024. The cast consists of seven single men: Cléber Zuffo, Fagner Sousa, Flávio Nakagima, Fernando Escarião, Igor Freitas, Lhuis Mattos and Vinicius Büttel; and five single women: Lis Aguiar, Lumena Aleluia, Maria Julia Mazalli, Martina Sanzi and Stéfani Bays. Lis, Lhuis and Martina returned as original cast members for the first time.

Before the season, several cast members appeared on other reality shows: Fagner Sousa on A Grande Conquista 1, Flávio Nakagima, the winner of Ilha Record 2, Stéfani Bays and Vinicius Büttel on A Fazenda 12 and A Fazenda 14, respectively, and Igor Freitas and Lumena Aleluia on De Férias com o Ex Caribe 2, before competing for spots on A Fazenda 15.

- **Bold** indicates original cast member; all other cast were brought into the series as an ex.

Episodes	Name	Notability	Exes
13	**Cléber Zuffo**	De Férias 4	—N/a
13	**Fagner Sousa (Fafá)**	De Férias 2	—N/a
13	**Fernando Escarião**	De Férias Caribe 2	Juliana
13	**Flávio Nakagima (Naka)**	Celebs 1 & Celebs 2	Carolina
13	**Igor Freitas**	De Férias 3	Nina
13	**Lis Aguiar**	De Férias 1	Valmir, Geraldo
13	**Lhuis Mattos**	De Férias Celebs 2	Apolo, Alan
13	**Lumena Aleluia**	Big Brother Brasil 21	—N/a
13	**Maria Julia Mazalli (Maju)**	De Férias 2 & Celebs 2	—N/a
13	**Martina Sanzi**	De Férias 3	Ian, Valmir
13	**Stéfani Bays**	De Férias 4 & Celebs 1	Valmir
13	**Vinicius Büttel (Vini)**	De Férias 3	Ana
12	Ian Barcellos	—N/a	Martina
8	Carolina Bueno (Carol)	—N/a	Flávio
10	Apolo Costa	De Férias Caribe 1	Lhuis
9	Valmir Wanderley (Val)	—N/a	Lis, Martina, Stéfani, Raquel
8	Geraldo Souto (Geraldinho)	—N/a	Lis
4	Juliana Araújo (Lika)	—N/a	Fagner
6	Raquel Trindade	—N/a	Valmir
5	Nina Pereira	—N/a	Igor, Robson
4	Robson Junior (Robinho)	—N/a	Nina
3	Ana Witcel	—N/a	Vinicius
2	Alan Rissato	—N/a	Lhuis

=== Duration of cast ===
Cast members	Episodes												
Cast members	1	2	3	4	5	6	7	8	9	10	11	12	13
Cléber													
Escarião													
Fafá													
Igor													
Lis													
Lhuis													
Lumena													
Maju													
Martina													
Naka													
Stéfani													
Vini													
Ian													
Carol													
Apolo													
Valmir													
Geraldinho													
Lika													
Raquel													
Nina													
Robinho													
Ana													
Alan													

Key
Cast member is featured in this episode
Cast member arrives on the beach
Cast member has an ex arrive on the beach
Cast member leaves the beach
Cast member does not feature in this episode

== Voting history ==
All 21 cast members present in the house during the final episode were eligible for the CEO vote, except Carol and Lika, who left the beach in episode 10. Each one could vote for any eligible cast member except themselves. During the on-location reunion, guest host Gabi Prado, a former cast member of De Férias com o Ex seasons 1 and 2, announced that Lumena won the vote, becoming the series's first CEO and winning the R$100,000 prize.

Finalists	Lumena	Valmir	Lhuis	Raquel
Votes	12–7–1–1			
Voter	Vote			
Alan	Yes			
Ana	Yes			
Apolo		Yes		
Cléber	Yes			
Escarião	Yes			
Fafá		Yes		
Geraldinho		Yes		
Igor		Yes		
Ian	Yes			
Lis	Yes			
Lhuis	Yes			
Lumena			Yes	
Maju	Yes			
Martina	Yes			
Naka		Yes		
Nina		Yes		
Raquel		Yes		
Robinho	Yes			
Stéfani	Yes			
Valmir				Yes
Vini	Yes			

== Episodes ==
No. overall	No. in season	Title	Original release date
1	1	"Episode 1"	June 6, 2024
2	2	"Episode 2"	June 6, 2024
3	3	"Episode 3"	June 13, 2024
4	4	"Episode 4"	June 20, 2024
5	5	"Episode 5"	June 27, 2024
6	6	"Episode 6"	July 4, 2024
7	7	"Episode 7"	July 11, 2024
8	8	"Episode 8"	July 18, 2024
9	9	"Episode 9"	July 25, 2024
10	10	"Episode 10"	August 1, 2024
11	11	"Episode 11"	August 8, 2024
12	12	"Episode 12"	August 15, 2024
13	13	"Episode 13"	August 22, 2024
