= De Férias com o Ex Caribe season 1 =

De Férias com o Ex Caribe
- Season 1
- No. of days: 24
- No. of housemates: 22
- Location: Isla Barú, Colombia
- No. of episodes: 12

Release
- Original network: MTV Brazil; MTV LA; Paramount+
- Original release: January 13 – March 31, 2022

Season chronology
- Next → Season 2

The first season of the De Férias com o Ex Caribe, premiered on MTV on January 13, 2022. It features ten singles living together on Isla Barú, Colombia with their ex-partners.

== Cast ==
The list of cast members was released on December 2, 2021. They include five women; Angietta Rodríguez, Camila Costa (De Férias com o Ex 6), Haeixa Pinheiro, Leticia Oliveira and Mariana Franco, and five men; Carlos Ortega, Gabriel Sampaio, João Vitor "Jotave" Pimentel, Mario Abraham (Are You the One? El Match Perfecto 2) and Vasco "Vascki" Pineda.

Notable exes include João Hadad (De Férias com o Ex 6) and Mariana "Mary" Magalhães (Rio Shore).

- **Bold** indicates original cast member; all other cast were brought into the series as an ex.

Episodes	Cast member	Age	Hometown	Exes
12	**Angietta Rodríguez**	27	Pereira, Colombia	—N/a
12	**Camilla Costa**	28	Rio de Janeiro	João Hadad
12	**Carlos Ortega**	27	Rio de Janeiro	Mari Azevedo, Julienne Freitas
12	**Gabriel Sampaio**	27	Brasília	Lua Alcântara
12	**Haeixa Pinheiro**	28	São Francisco do Sul	Bruno Ogliari
12	**João Vitor "Jotave" Pimentel**	23	Rio de Janeiro	Mary Magalhães
12	**Leticia Oliveira**	27	Piracicaba	Apolo Costa, Isabela Costa
12	**Mari Franco**	30	Vitória	Bernardo Luna
12	**Mario Abraham**	30	Mexico City, Mexico	—N/a
12	**Vasco "Vascki" Pineda**	33	Morelia, Mexico	Bruno Damásio
7	João Hadad	27	Guarapari	Camilla Costa
11	Mari Azevedo	24	Porto Alegre	Carlos Ortega, Julio Marra
10	Apolo Costa	21	São Paulo	Leticia Oliveira
9	Lua Alcântara	29	Rio de Janeiro	Gabriel Sampaio
8	Julio Marra	24	Rio de Janeiro	Mariana Azevedo
8	Julienne Freitas	29	Rio de Janeiro	Carlos Ortega
7	Bernardo Luna	26	Juiz de Fora	Mariana Franco, Thaís Abelha
7	Thaís Abelha	28	Vila Velha	Bernardo Luna
5	Bruno Damásio	29	Juazeiro	Vascky Pineda
4	Isabela "Isa" Costa	25	Limeira	Leticia Oliveira
3	Mariana "Mary" Magalhães	25	Rio de Janeiro	JV Pimentel
2	Bruno Ogliari	27	Joinville	Haeixa Pinheiro

== Duration of cast ==
Cast members	Episodes											
Cast members	1	2	3	4	5	6	7	8	9	10	11	12
Angietta												
Camilla												
Carlos												
Gabriel												
Haeixa												
Jotave												
Leticia												
Mari Franco												
Mario												
Vascki												
Hadad												
Mari Azevedo												
Apolo												
Lua												
Julio												
Julienne												
Bernardo												
Abelha												
Damásio												
Isa												
Mary												
Bruno												

Key
Cast member is featured in this episode
Cast member arrives on the beach
Cast member has an ex arrive on the beach
Cast member arrives on the beach and has an ex arrive during the same episode
Cast member leaves the beach
Cast member does not feature in this episode

== Episodes ==
No. overall	No. in season	Title	Original release date
1	1	"Episode 1"	January 13, 2022
2	2	"Episode 2"	January 20, 2022
3	3	"Episode 3"	January 27, 2022
4	4	"Episode 4"	February 3, 2022
5	5	"Episode 5"	February 10, 2022
6	6	"Episode 6"	February 17, 2022
7	7	"Episode 7"	February 24, 2022
8	8	"Episode 8"	March 3, 2022
9	9	"Episode 9"	March 10, 2022
10	10	"Episode 10"	March 17, 2022
11	11	"Episode 11"	March 24, 2022
12	12	"Episode 12"	March 31, 2022
