= De Férias com o Ex season 4 =

Brazilian version of the reality television show

De Férias com o Ex
- Season 4
- No. of housemates: 22
- Location: Ilhabela, São Paulo
- No. of episodes: 12

Release
- Original network: MTV
- Original release: April 25 – July 11, 2019

Season chronology
- ← Previous; Season 3 Next → Celebs

The fourth season of the Brazilian version of the reality television show De Férias com o Ex, premiered on MTV on Thursday, April 25, 2019. The season concluded on 11 July 2019 after twelve episodes. The season was filmed in Ilhabela, São Paulo, and was the first season filmed outside the Nordeste.

== Cast ==
Episode	Name	Age (Note: Age when first appearing on the show.)	Hometown	Exes
11	Bruno Mooneyhan	29	Natal, RN	Ingrid Cardoso
12	Carlos Gopfert	32	São Paulo, SP	Stefani Bays
7	Cléber Zuffo	23	Florianópolis, SC	Fábia Calazans
12	Gabriella Leite	27	Goiânia, GO	Miguel Neto, Pedro Calderari
12	Gabriel Aglio	26	Niterói, RJ	Ana Carolina Andrade
12	Guilherme Leonel	27	Rio de Janeiro, RJ	Carolina Mattesco
12	Jhenyfer Dulz (Bifão)	29	São Paulo, SP	Leonardo Xavier, Luca Colela
12	Sarah Fonseca	25	Niterói, RJ	Matheus Crivella (Novinho)
12	Tatiana Dias	28	São Paulo, SP	Luca Colela
12	Yasmin Alves	26	São Paulo, SP	
12	Fábia Calazans	23	Florianópolis, SC	Cléber Zuffo
11	Miguel Neto	24	Goiânia, GO	Gabriella Leite
11	Stéfani Bays	23	São Leopoldo, RS	Carlos Gopfert
9	Leonardo Xavier	28	São Paulo, SP	Jhenyfer Dulz (Bifão), Karina Sousa
8	Carolina Mattesco	27	Rio de Janeiro, RJ	Guilherme Leonel
5	Pedro Calderari	30	Rio de Janeiro, RJ	Gabriella Leite, Laryssa Bottino
6	Ana Carolina Andrade	20	Foz do Iguaçu, PR	Gabriel Aglio
6	Laryssa Bottino	21	Rio de Janeiro, RJ	Pedro Calderari
5	Matheus Crivella (Novinho)	26	Rio de Janeiro, RJ	Sarah Fonseca
4	Karina Sousa	26	São Paulo, SP	Leonardo Xavier
3	Ingrid Cardoso	24	Natal, RN	Bruno Mooneyhan
2	Luca Colela	29	Rio de Janeiro, RJ	Jhenyfer Dulz (Bifão), Tatiana Dias

=== Cast duration ===
Cast members	Episodes											
Cast members	1	2	3	4	5	6	7	8	9	10	11	12
Bifão												
Bruno												
Carlos												
Cleber												
Gabi												
Gabriel												
Gui												
Sarah												
Tati												
Yasmin												
Fabia												
Miguel												
Stefani												
Leo												
Carol												
Pedro												
Ana												
Lary												
Matheus												
Karina												
Ingrid												
Luca												

Key: = "Cast member" is featured in this episode
Key: = "Cast member" arrives on the beach
Key: = "Cast member" has an ex arrive on the beach
Key: = "Cast member" has two exes arrive on the beach
Key: = "Cast member" arrives on the beach and has an ex arrive during the same episode
Key: = "Cast member" leaves the beach
Key: = "Cast member" has an ex arrive on the beach and leaves during the same episode
Key: = "Cast member" arrives on the beach and leaves during the same episode
Key: = "Cast member" does not feature in this episode

== Future Appearances ==
Bifão and Tati Dias, appeared in A Fazenda 11. Tati finished in 13th, while Bifão finished in 11th.

Stéfani Bays appeared in the follow season, De Férias com o Ex Brasil: Celebs as original cast member. Stéfani also appeared in A Fazenda 12, she finished in 3rd place in the competition. In 2024 appeared in De Férias com o Ex Diretoria.

Matheus Crivella appeared in De Férias com o Ex 6 as original cast member. In January 2021 he was part of Acapulco Shore: The family back in Acapulco. And in September of that year he joined Rio Shore. In 2023 he appeared as ex in De Férias com o Ex Caribe. In 2026 he returned as a main member for the second season of De Férias com o Ex Diretoria.

Laryssa Bottino appeared in De Férias com o Ex: Celebs 2 as original cast member. In 2021, Lary also appeared in A Fazenda 13, she finished in 16th place in the competition. In 2023, Lary appeared on A Grande Conquista 1, she had to compete for a place to enter in the game and she didn't enter.

Jhenyfer "Bifão" Dulz appeared in De Férias com o Ex Caribe 2 as original cast member. In 2024, Bifão also appeared on A Grande Conquista 2, she had to compete for a place to enter in the game and she didn't enter.

In 2024, Cléber Zuffo appeared in De Férias com o Ex Diretoria as original cast member, and in 2026 he returned for the second season.
