= Tarso Brant =

Brazilian actor, model (born 1993)

- Born: February 7, 1993 (age 33); Belo Horizonte, Minas Gerais, Brazil
- Other name: Tarso Alexandre da Silva Borges
- Occupations: Actor, model, social media personality
- Years active: 2016 – present

Tarso Alexandre da Silva Borges, better known as Tarso Brant (born February 7, 1993), is a Brazilian actor and model.

== Life and career ==
Tarso Alexandre da Silva Borges was born on February 7, 1993, in Belo Horizonte in Minas Gerais, Brazil. Brant was born as female and became nationally known in 2016 on social media, after displaying a gender transition to male which had started around age 21. In December 2025, he revealed that he is bisexual.

In 2017, Tarso assisted screenwriter Glória Perez in creating a trans character for the TV Globo soap opera, A Força do Querer. He was also a guest star on A Força do Querer, in the role of Tê, a trans man. In 2021, Tarso was confirmed as one of the participants in MTV's De Férias com o Ex (season 7), becoming the first trans participant on the show.
