= De Férias com o Ex season 6 =

De Férias com o Ex
- Season 6
- No. of housemates: 22
- Location: Jericoacoara, Ceará
- No. of episodes: 12

Release
- Original network: MTV; Paramount+
- Original release: May 21 – August 6, 2020

Season chronology
- ← Previous; Season 5 Next → Season 7

The sixth season of the Brazilian version of the reality television show De Férias com o Ex, premiered on MTV on May 21, 2020.

The season featured the return of Matheus Crivella, this time, as an original cast member following his appearance in the fourth season of the show as an ex. Scarlat Cióla also made her return to the series having first appeared during the second season.

The season was filmed in Jericoacoara, Ceará from January 28 to February 20, 2020.

It is the first season to feature openly LGBT male cast members (openly bisexual females have been part of the show since the first season).

However, through the airing of the season, MTV has come under criticism by media, viewers and cast members for censoring same-sex scenes from the episodes, while mixed-sex couples were left uncensored. First in episode 6, when Rafa Vieira and Jarlles Góis spent the night together in one of the bedrooms, and then, a second time on episode 9 when Jarlles Góis and Leo Lacerda went to the Suite Master.

The incident was followed by accusations of double standard, homophobia and questioning of the network's social activism authenticity (as episode 6 was first broadcast on June 25, 2020, during the LGBT Pride Month, heavily promoted and celebrated during the commercial breaks of MTV's programming). After a series of complaints from the public, intimate scenes between Léo Lacerda and Matheus Magalhães were shown uncensored during episodes 10 and 11.

== Cast ==
The official list of cast members were released on February 14, 2020. They included five boys: Caio Cabral, Igor Adamovich, João Hadad, Matheus Crivella and Rafael Vieira, and five girls: Bárbara Morais, Flávia Caroline, Jéssica Marisol, Mayara Cardoso and Mina Winkel.

- **Bold** indicates original cast member; all other cast were brought into the series as an ex.

Episode	Name	Age (Note: Age when first appearing on the show.)	Hometown	Exes
12	**Bárbara Morais**	24	Natal	Jarlles Gois, Arthur Muniz
12	**Caio Cabral**	22	São Paulo	Scarlat Cióla
12	**Flávia Caroline**	24	Santo André	Victor Padula
12	**Igor Adamovich**	26	Rio de Janeiro	—N/a
12	**Jéssica Marisol**	30	Juiz de Fora	—N/a
12	**João Hadad**	25	Guarapari	Rebecca Diniz, Larissa Cozer
12	**Matheus Crivella (Novinho)**	28	Rio de Janeiro	Camilla Costa, Scarlat Cióla
12	**Mayara Cardoso**	25	Rio de Janeiro	Natan Amorim
12	**Mina Winkel**	28	Pelotas	Diego Poggetti
12	**Rafael Vieira**	30	São Paulo	Matheus Magalhães
12	Rebecca Diniz	27	Vitória	João Hadad
5	Diego Poggetti	24	São Lourenço do Sul	Mina Winkel
11	Camilla Costa	26	Rio de Janeiro	Matheus Crivella
10	Victor Padula	27	São Paulo	Flávia Caroline
9	Jarlles Gois	32	São José do Seridó	Bárbara Morais
8	Scarlat Cióla	25	São Paulo	Caio Cabral, Matheus Crivella, Rafael Dutra
7	Matheus Magalhães	31	Presidente Prudente	Rafael Vieira, Leo Lacerda
6	Natan Amorim	29	Rio de Janeiro	Mayara Cardoso
5	Larissa Cozer	25	Vitória	João Hadad
4	Leo Lacerda	25	São Paulo	Matheus Magalhães
3	Rafael Dutra	24	São Paulo	Scarlat Cióla
2	Arthur Muniz	26	Natal	Bárbara Morais

=== Duration of cast ===
Cast members	Episodes											
Cast members	1	2	3	4	5	6	7	8	9	10	11	12
Bárbara												
Caio												
Flávia												
Hadad												
Igor												
Jéssica												
Mayara												
Mina												
Novinho												
Rafa												
Rebecca												
Diego												
Camilla												
Victor												
Jarlles												
Scarlat												
Matheus												
Natan												
Larissa												
Leo												
Rafael												
Arthur												

Key: Cast member is featured in this episode
Key: Cast member arrives on the beach
Key: Cast member has an ex arrive on the beach
Key: Cast member has two exes arrive on the beach
Key: Cast member arrives on the beach and has an ex arrive during the same episode
Key: Cast member leaves the beach
Key: Cast member has an ex arrive on the beach and leaves during the same episode
Key: Cast member arrives on the beach and leaves during the same episode
Key: Cast member does not feature in this episode

== Future Appearances ==
In 2022, João Hadad appeared with his girlfriend Luana Andrade in Power Couple Brasil 6, they finished in 4th place in the competition.

In 2024, Jéssica Marisol and João Hadad appeared on A Grande Conquista 2, they have to compete for a place to enter in the mansion. Jéssica didn't enter, while Hadad won him place in the mansion.

In 2026 Leo Lacerda and Mayara Cardoso returned as main members of the second season of De Férias om o Ex Diretoria.

== Guest appearances ==
Episode 7

- Regina Adamovich (Igor's mother)

Episode 9

- Kevin o Chris

Episode 11

- MC Rebecca

Episode 12

- Matuê
