= Power Couple (Brazilian TV series) season 4 =

Power Couple
- Season 4
- Hosted by: Gugu Liberato
- No. of days: 87
- No. of contestants: 26 (13 couples)
- Winners: Nicole & Bimbi
- Runners-up: Mariana & Daniel
- No. of episodes: 63

Release
- Original network: RecordTV
- Original release: April 30 – July 25, 2019

Season chronology
- ← Previous; Season 3 Next → Season 5

The fourth season of Power Couple premiered on Tuesday, April 30, 2019, at 10:30 p.m. on RecordTV.

The show features thirteen celebrity couples living under one roof and facing extreme challenges that will test how well they really know each other. Each week, a couple will be eliminated until the last couple wins the grand prize.

Nicole Bahls & Marcelo Bimbi won the competition with 48.60% of the public vote over Mariana Felício & Daniel Saullo and Clara Maia & André Coelho and took home the R$596.000 prize they accumulated during the show. Mariana & Daniel received R$98.900 (10% of their final jackpot) as the runners-up.

== Cast ==
=== Couples ===
Celebrity	Occupation	Partner	Occupation	Status
Faby Monarca	Businesswoman	Enrico Mansur	Singer	Eliminated 1st on May 7, 2019
Marcelo Tchakabum	Musician	Elaine Costa	Dancer	Eliminated 2nd on May 14, 2019
Debby Lagranha	Actress	Leandro Franco	Veterinarian	Eliminated 3rd on May 21, 2019
Kamilla Salgado Returned on June 11	Journalist	Eliéser Ambrósio; Returned on June 11	DJ	Eliminated 4th on May 28, 2019
Maikel Castro	Model	Jackie Sampaio	Public relations	Eliminated 5th on June 4, 2019
Nicole Bahls Returned on June 11	Model	Marcelo Bimbi; Returned on June 11	Model	Eliminated 6th on June 11, 2019
Kamilla Salgado	Journalist	Eliéser Ambrósio	DJ	Eliminated 7th on June 18, 2019
Lucas Salles	Actor	Camila Colombo	Producer	Eliminated 8th on June 25, 2019
Taty Zatto	DJ	Marcelo Braga	Manager	Eliminated 9th on July 2, 2019
Paula Pequeno	Volleyball player	Alexandre Folhas	Handball player	Eliminated 10th on July 9, 2019
André Marinho	Singer	Drika Marinho	Ballet dancer	Eliminated 11th on July 16, 2019
Ju Valcézia	TV host	Ricarddo Manga	Actor	Eliminated 12th on July 23, 2019
Clara Maia	Digital Influencer	André Coelho	Digital Influencer	Third place on July 25, 2019
Mariana Felício	Businesswoman	Daniel Saullo	Businessman	Runner-up on July 25, 2019
Nicole Bahls	Model	Marcelo Bimbi	Model	Winners on July 25, 2019

== Future Appearances ==
After this season, in 2019, Drika Marinho (from André & Drika) appeared in A Fazenda 11, she finished in 17th place in the competition.

In 2022, André Marinho (from André & Drika) appeared in A Fazenda 14, he finished in 5th place in the competition.

In 2023, Faby Monarca (from Faby & Enrico) appeared on A Grande Conquista 1, she received enough votes to enter in the game, Faby quit the game and finished the game in 17th place.

== The game ==
Key

Men's challenge bet	Women's challenge bet	**T** Total money combined	Passed the challenge (adds the betting sum)	Failed the challenge (deducts the betting sum)	Won couples' challenge (immunity and adds R$20.000)

=== Challenges' results ===
		Week 1	Week 2	Week 3	Week 4	Week 5	Week 6		Week 7	Week 8	Week 9	Week 10	Week 11	Week 12	Week 13
		Week 1	Week 2	Week 3	Week 4	Week 5	Day 42	Day 44	Week 7	Week 8	Week 9	Week 10	Week 11	Week 12	Finale
Sum of money		R$040.000	R$040.000	R$040.000	R$040.000	R$040.000	R$040.000	Wildcard	R$040.000	R$040.000	R$040.000	R$040.000	R$040.000	R$040.000	Jackpot
Bets
Nicole & Bimbi		R$025.000	R$025.000	R$025.000	R$057.000	R$023.000	R$028.000	Returnee 1	R$030.000	R$029.000	R$032.000	R$025.000	R$010.000	R$025.000	R$596.000
Nicole & Bimbi		R$020.000	R$015.000	R$021.000	R$019.000	R$017.000	R$058.000	Returnee 1	R$010.000	R$010.000	R$002.000	R$015.000	R$000.000	R$002.000	R$596.000
Nicole & Bimbi	T	R$085.000	R$050.000	R$106.000	R$118.000	R$046.000	R$010.000	Returnee 1	R$060.000	R$059.000	R$006.000	R$020.000	R$030.000	R$013.000	R$596.000
Mariana & Daniel		R$032.000	R$027.000	R$035.000	R$039.000	R$028.000	R$039.000		R$011.000	R$034.000	R$037.000	R$013.000	R$013.000	R$078.000	R$989.000
Mariana & Daniel		R$072.000	R$008.000	R$075.000	R$001.000	R$012.000	R$079.000		R$011.000	R$006.000	R$010.000	R$008.000	R$053.000	R$038.000	R$989.000
Mariana & Daniel	T	R$144.000	R$054.000	R$150.000	R$078.000	R$056.000	R$020.000		R$062.000	R$000.000	R$087.000	R$061.000	R$126.000	R$156.000	R$989.000
Clara & Coelho		R$028.000	R$033.000	R$029.000	R$025.000	R$030.000	R$032.000		R$010.000	R$045.000	R$039.000	R$015.000	R$017.000	R$026.000	R$768.000
Clara & Coelho		R$030.000	R$006.000	R$069.000	R$015.000	R$010.000	R$029.000		R$004.000	R$005.000	R$001.000	R$010.000	R$017.000	R$030.000	R$768.000
Clara & Coelho	T	R$058.000	R$067.000	R$138.000	R$070.000	R$060.000	R$043.000		R$074.000	R$090.000	R$020.000	R$035.000	R$074.000	R$044.000	R$768.000
Ju & Manga		R$035.000	R$028.000	R$033.000	R$012.000	R$015.000	R$037.000		R$031.000	R$035.000	R$035.000	R$011.000	R$011.000	R$001.000	R$886.000
Ju & Manga		R$025.000	R$030.000	R$073.000	R$009.000	R$015.000	R$075.000		R$003.000	R$003.000	R$005.000	R$004.000	R$029.000	R$039.000	R$886.000
Ju & Manga	T	R$050.000	R$118.000	R$146.000	R$043.000	R$010.000	R$152.000		R$074.000	R$092.000	R$080.000	R$047.000	R$058.000	R$002.000	R$886.000
André & Drika		R$017.000	R$015.000	R$021.000	R$004.000	R$016.000	R$017.000		R$026.000	R$028.000	R$036.000	R$002.000	R$018.000		R$518.000
André & Drika		R$019.000	R$025.000	R$058.000	R$003.000	R$008.000	R$020.000		R$002.000	R$001.000	R$003.000	R$002.000	R$009.000		R$518.000
André & Drika	T	R$042.000	R$030.000	R$119.000	R$033.000	R$048.000	R$043.000		R$064.000	R$067.000	R$001.000	R$040.000	R$031.000		R$518.000
Paula & Folhas		R$031.000	R$012.000	R$038.000	R$034.000	R$024.000	R$038.000		R$038.000	R$032.000	R$038.000	R$010.000			R$631.000
Paula & Folhas		R$009.000	R$018.000	R$078.000	R$016.000	R$016.000	R$074.000		R$022.000	R$008.000	R$000.000	R$030.000			R$631.000
Paula & Folhas	T	R$018.000	R$075.000	R$156.000	R$022.000	R$000.000	R$152.000		R$056.000	R$064.000	R$078.000	R$020.000			R$631.000
Taty & Braga		R$022.000	R$002.000	R$024.000	R$000.000	R$010.000	R$020.000		R$039.000	R$023.000	R$012.000				R$315.000
Taty & Braga		R$018.000	R$014.000	R$036.000	R$020.000	R$030.000	R$017.000		R$001.000	R$015.000	R$004.000				R$315.000
Taty & Braga	T	R$036.000	R$056.000	R$100.000	R$060.000	R$000.000	R$037.000		R$000.000	R$002.000	R$024.000				R$315.000
Lucas & Camila		R$012.000	R$022.000	R$016.000	R$003.000	R$008.000	R$029.000		R$016.000	R$020.000					R$378.000
Lucas & Camila		R$010.000	R$011.000	R$056.000	R$000.000	R$025.000	R$067.000		R$009.000	R$020.000					R$378.000
Lucas & Camila	T	R$036.000	R$051.000	R$112.000	R$037.000	R$093.000	R$002.000		R$047.000	R$000.000					R$378.000
Kamilla & Eliéser		R$021.000	R$029.000	R$017.000	R$001.000			Returnee 2	R$017.000						R$224.000
Kamilla & Eliéser		R$017.000	R$038.000	R$057.000	R$039.000			Returnee 2	R$000.000						R$224.000
Kamilla & Eliéser	T	R$036.000	R$049.000	R$114.000	R$002.000			Returnee 2	R$023.000						R$224.000
Maikel & Jackie		R$018.000	R$020.000	R$028.000	R$018.000	R$003.000									R$209.000
Maikel & Jackie		R$016.000	R$020.000	R$068.000	R$010.000	R$020.000									R$209.000
Maikel & Jackie	T	R$074.000	R$040.000	R$000.000	R$032.000	R$063.000									R$209.000
Debby & Leandro		R$013.000	R$003.000	R$023.000											R$197.000
Debby & Leandro		R$003.000	R$031.000	R$040.000											R$197.000
Debby & Leandro	T	R$030.000	R$064.000	R$103.000											R$197.000
Marcelo & Elaine		R$015.000	R$011.000												R$030.000
Marcelo & Elaine		R$014.000	R$010.000												R$030.000
Marcelo & Elaine	T	R$011.000	R$019.000												R$030.000
Faby & Enrico		R$019.000													R$052.000
Faby & Enrico		R$007.000													R$052.000
Faby & Enrico	T	R$052.000													R$052.000
Notes		1	2, 3	(none)			4, 5	(none)	6	(none)					7
Least money (pre-challenge)			Marcelo; Elaine	Maikel; Jackie	Kamilla; Eliéser	Paula; Folhas	Mariana; Daniel		Taty; Braga	Lucas; Camila	Clara; Coelho	Nicole; Bimbi	Nicole; Bimbi	Ju; Manga	
Least money (pre-challenge)		Marcelo; Elaine	André; Drika	Nicole; Bimbi	Paula; Folhas	Taty; Braga	Lucas; Camila		Kamilla; Eliéser	Mariana; Daniel	André; Drika	Paula; Folhas	André; Drika	Nicole; Bimbi	
Couples' veto power (most money)		Mariana; Daniel	Ju; Manga	Paula; Folhas	Nicole; Bimbi	Lucas; Camila	Ju; Manga		Ju; Manga	Clara; Coelho	Mariana; Daniel	Mariana; Daniel	Mariana; Daniel	Mariana; Daniel	
Vetoed from Couples' challenge		Faby; Enrico	André; Drika	Mariana; Daniel	Taty; Braga	André; Drika	Taty; Braga		Paula; Folhas	André; Drika	Ju; Manga				
Couples' challenge winners		Clara; Coelho	Ju; Manga	Nicole; Bimbi	Clara; Coelho	Lucas; Camila	Mariana; Daniel	Nicole; Bimbi	Clara; Coelho	Ju; Manga	Clara; Coelho	Nicole; Bimbi	Mariana; Daniel	Clara; Coelho	Clara; Coelho
Nominated
Couples' challenge losers		Lucas; Camila	Nicole; Bimbi	Taty; Braga	André; Drika	Maikel; Jackie	André; Drika		André; Drika	Taty; Braga	André; Drika	Paula; Folhas	André; Drika	Nicole; Bimbi	
Least money (post-challenge)		Marcelo; Elaine	Marcelo; Elaine	Maikel; Jackie	Kamilla; Eliéser	Paula; Folhas	Lucas; Camila		Taty; Braga	Lucas; Camila	Nicole; Bimbi	Clara; Coelho	Nicole; Bimbi	Ju; Manga	
Least money (post-challenge)			André; Drika	Debby; Leandro	Paula; Folhas	Taty; Braga	Nicole; Bimbi		Kamilla; Eliéser	Mariana; Daniel	Taty; Braga	André; Drika	Ju; Manga	Mariana; Daniel	
Challenge winners' choice		Faby; Enrico													

==== Notes ====
- **^Note 1**: Clara & Coelho ranked first in the Men's challenge and won a brand new car and the Special power (chosen by a live public vote) to choose a couple to have to bet all their remaining jackpot in the Women's Challenge. They chose Paula & Folhas.
- **^Note 2**: Paula & Folhas' sum of money was increased to R$ 45.000, while Mariana & Daniel's was reduced to R$ 35.000 due to the use of Clara & Coelho's Special power on week 1's elimination night.
- **^Note 3**: André & Drika, as one of the two couples with the least amount of money combined were automatically nominated, as they couldn't compete in the Couples' challenge due to being chosen by Ju & Manga at the end of the Men & Women's challenges.
- **^Note 4**: Ju & Manga and Paula & Folhas were tied in first place at the end of the Men & Women's challenges with R$152.000 each. Per the rules, since Ju & Manga have the most money in their overall bank account, they had to veto a couple from competing in the Couples' challenge (Taty & Braga); as both couples still tied after that challenge, Ju & Manga also became this week's Power Couple.
- **^Note 5**: André & Drika and Ju & Manga were tied in last place at this week's Couples' challenge with 17 (out of 21) correct answers each. Per the rules, since André & Drika have the least money in their overall bank account, they were nominated.
- **^Note 6**: Clara & Coelho won the Couples' challenge which added R$20.000 in their total money this cycle, resulting them tied in first place with Ju & Manga with R$74.000 each. However, per the rules, since Ju & Manga have the most money in their overall bank account, they became this week's Power Couple.
- **^Note 7**: The three finalists competed in a special Couples' challenge which aired during finale night in order to win a brand new car. Clara & Coelho ended up winning the challenge.

=== Special power ===
Each week, the couples' challenge winners randomly picked two out of eight boxes from the Tree of Power of the different colors. Then, the couple would be given a choice between two advantages in the game; the couple's choice is marked in bold.

==== Results ====
Week	Couples' challenge winners	Advantages
1	Clara & Coelho	Cancel two other couples' votes.; **Chose a couple to have their sum of money reduced by R$5.000 and another to have their sum of money increased by R$5.000**. →**Mariana & Daniel and Paula & Folhas**
2	Ju & Manga	Becoming not eligible to vote but have their sum of money increased by R$5.000.; **Chose a couple to have an advantage and another to have a disadvantage at the next Couples' challenge**. →**Maikel & Jackie and Clara & Coelho**
3	Nicole & Bimbi	Trade a couple who is nominated by another couple who is not nominated.; **Exchange the couple saved by the house by one of the other nominees**. →**Debby & Leandro for Maikel & Jackie**
4	Clara & Coelho	Choose a couple to do all the housework next week.; **A double vote at this week's Elimination ceremony**. →**Clara & Coelho's vote on Paula & Folhas**
5	Lucas & Camila	Choose a couple to share next week's profit with them.; **Bet R$10.000 in one of the nominees to be eliminated**. →**Taty & Braga**
6	Mariana & Daniel	Choose a couple that have to bet all their sum of money.; **Choose a couple to sleep in the living room next week**. →**Kamilla & Eliéser**
7	Clara & Coelho	Trade all nominated couples by the three couples with the least money in their overall bank accounts.; **Ban two couples from casting their votes this week**. →**Ju & Manga and Paula & Folhas**
8	Ju & Manga	Chose two couples to have a disadvantage at the next Couples' challenge.; **Chose to cancel this week's 'couples' save' vote and add an extra R$10.000 to their bank account**. →**Mariana & Daniel**
9	Clara & Coelho	Trade all nominated couples by the three couples with the least money in their overall bank accounts.; **Chose two couples to have a disadvantage at the next Couples' challenge**. →**Ju & Manga and Paula & Folhas**
10	Nicole & Bimbi	Chose a couple to have their sum of money reduced by R$10.000 and have their sum of money increased by R$10.000.; **Chose to cancel this week's 'couples' save' vote and have an advantage at the next Couples' challenge**. →**Clara & Coelho**
11	Mariana & Daniel	Banned the highest money nominated couple from being saved by the house vote.; **Choose a non-nominated couple to bet all their sum of money in the next week**. →**Ju & Manga**

=== Voting history ===
	Week 1	Week 2	Week 3	Week 4	Week 5	Week 6		Week 7	Week 8	Week 9	Week 10	Week 11	Week 12	Week 13
	Week 1	Week 2	Week 3	Week 4	Week 5	Day 41	Day 43	Week 7	Week 8	Week 9	Week 10	Week 11	Week 12	Finale
Power Couple	Mariana; Daniel	Ju; Manga	Paula; Folhas	Nicole; Bimbi	Lucas; Camila	Ju; Manga	(none)	Ju; Manga	Ju; Manga	Mariana; Daniel	Mariana; Daniel	Mariana; Daniel	Mariana; Daniel	(none)
Nominated	Lucas; Camila	Nicole; Bimbi	Taty; Braga	André; Drika	Maikel; Jackie	André; Drika	(none)	André; Drika	Taty; Braga	André; Drika	Paula; Folhas	André; Drika	Nicole; Bimbi	(none)
Nominated	Marcelo; Elaine	Marcelo; Elaine	Maikel; Jackie	Kamilla; Eliéser	Paula; Folhas	Lucas; Camila	(none)	Taty; Braga	Lucas; Camila	Nicole; Bimbi	Clara; Coelho	Nicole; Bimbi	Ju; Manga	(none)
Nominated	Faby; Enrico	André; Drika	Debby; Leandro	Paula; Folhas	Taty; Braga	Nicole; Bimbi	(none)	Kamilla; Eliéser	Mariana; Daniel	Taty; Braga	André; Drika	Ju; Manga	Mariana; Daniel	(none)
Nicole & Bimbi	Marcelo; Elaine	Nominated	~~Taty~~; ~~Braga~~	Kamilla; Eliéser	Taty; Braga	Nominated	Returned	Taty; Braga	~~Taty~~; ~~Braga~~	Nominated	~~André~~; ~~Drika~~	Nominated	Nominated	**Winners** (Day 87)
Mariana & Daniel	Lucas; Camila	André; Drika	~~Debby~~; ~~Leandro~~	Paula; Folhas	Paula; Folhas	Lucas; Camila	Not eligible	André; Drika	Nominated	André; Drika	~~Clara~~; ~~Coelho~~	Ju; Manga	Nominated	**Runner-up** (Day 87)
Clara & Coelho	Banned	Nicole; Bimbi	~~Debby~~; ~~Leandro~~	Paula; Folhas ^{(×2)}	Paula; Folhas	Lucas; Camila	Not eligible	André; Drika	~~Mariana~~; ~~Daniel~~	André; Drika	Nominated	Ju; Manga	Mariana; Daniel	**Third place** (Day 87)
Ju & Manga	Marcelo; Elaine	André; Drika	~~Taty~~; ~~Braga~~	Paula; Folhas	Maikel; Jackie	Lucas; Camila	Not eligible	Banned	~~Mariana~~; ~~Daniel~~	André; Drika	~~Clara~~; ~~Coelho~~	Nominated	Nominated	Eliminated (Day 85)
André & Drika	Lucas; Camila	Nominated	~~Debby~~; ~~Leandro~~	Nominated	Paula; Folhas	Nominated	Not eligible	Nominated	~~Mariana~~; ~~Daniel~~	Nominated	Nominated	Nominated	Eliminated (Day 78)	
Paula & Folhas	Marcelo; Elaine	André; Drika	~~Debby~~; ~~Leandro~~	Nominated	Nominated	Lucas; Camila	Not eligible	Banned	~~Mariana~~; ~~Daniel~~	André; Drika	Nominated	Eliminated (Day 71)		
Taty & Braga	Marcelo; Elaine	Nicole; Bimbi	Nominated	Kamilla; Eliéser	Nominated	Nicole; Bimbi	Not eligible	Nominated	Nominated	Nominated	Eliminated (Day 64)			
Lucas & Camila	Nominated	André; Drika	~~Debby~~; ~~Leandro~~	Paula; Folhas	Paula; Folhas	Nominated	Not eligible	André; Drika	Nominated	Eliminated (Day 57)				
Kamilla & Eliéser	Marcelo; Elaine	Nicole; Bimbi	~~Taty~~; ~~Braga~~	Nominated	Eliminated (Day 29)		Returned	Nominated	Re-Eliminated (Day 50)					
Maikel & Jackie	Faby; Enrico	Nicole; Bimbi	Nominated	André; Drika	Nominated	Eliminated (Day 36)								
Debby & Leandro	Lucas; Camila	André; Drika	Nominated	Eliminated (Day 22)										
Marcelo & Elaine	Nominated	Nominated	Eliminated (Day 15)											
Faby & Enrico	Nominated	Eliminated (Day 8)												
Notes	(none)		1	2	(none)		3	4	5	(none)	6	(none)	7	8
Couples' save	Marcelo; Elaine	André; Drika	~~Debby~~; ~~Leandro~~	Paula; Folhas	Paula; Folhas	Lucas; Camila		André; Drika	~~Mariana~~; ~~Daniel~~	André; Drika	~~Clara~~; ~~Coelho~~	Ju; Manga	Mariana; Daniel	(none)
Couples' save	Marcelo; Elaine	André; Drika	Maikel; Jackie	Paula; Folhas	Paula; Folhas	Lucas; Camila		André; Drika	~~Mariana~~; ~~Daniel~~	André; Drika	~~Clara~~; ~~Coelho~~	Ju; Manga	Mariana; Daniel	(none)
Sent to elimination	Faby; Enrico	Marcelo; Elaine	Debby; Leandro	André; Drika	Maikel; Jackie	André; Drika		Kamilla; Eliéser	Lucas; Camila	Nicole; Bimbi	André; Drika	André; Drika	Ju; Manga	Clara; Coelho
Sent to elimination	Faby; Enrico	Marcelo; Elaine	Debby; Leandro	André; Drika	Maikel; Jackie	André; Drika		Kamilla; Eliéser	Mariana; Daniel	Nicole; Bimbi	Clara; Coelho	André; Drika	Ju; Manga	Mariana; Daniel
Sent to elimination	Lucas; Camila	Nicole; Bimbi	Taty; Braga	Kamilla; Eliéser	Taty; Braga	Nicole; Bimbi		Taty; Braga	Mariana; Daniel	Taty; Braga	Clara; Coelho	Nicole; Bimbi	Nicole; Bimbi	Mariana; Daniel
Sent to elimination	Lucas; Camila	Nicole; Bimbi	Taty; Braga	Kamilla; Eliéser	Taty; Braga	Nicole; Bimbi		Taty; Braga	Taty; Braga	Taty; Braga	Paula; Folhas	Nicole; Bimbi	Nicole; Bimbi	Nicole; Bimbi
Eliminated	**Faby**; **Enrico**; 21.29% to save	**Marcelo**; **Elaine**; 35.53% to save	**Debby**; **Leandro**; 37.36% to save	**Kamilla**; **Eliéser**; 30.86% to save	**Maikel**; **Jackie**; 43.00% to save	**Nicole**; **Bimbi**; 48.10% to save	**Nicole**; **Bimbi**; Won couples' challenge	**Kamilla**; **Eliéser**; 22.56% to save	**Lucas**; **Camila**; 21.46% to save	**Taty**; **Braga**; 40.34% to save	**Paula**; **Folhas**; 24.91% to save	**André**; **Drika**; 29.72% to save	**Ju**; **Manga**; 42.41% to save	**Clara**; **Coelho**; 8.41% to win
Eliminated	**Faby**; **Enrico**; 21.29% to save	**Marcelo**; **Elaine**; 35.53% to save	**Debby**; **Leandro**; 37.36% to save	**Kamilla**; **Eliéser**; 30.86% to save	**Maikel**; **Jackie**; 43.00% to save	**Nicole**; **Bimbi**; 48.10% to save	**Kamilla**; **Eliéser**; 38.94% to re-enter	**Kamilla**; **Eliéser**; 22.56% to save	**Lucas**; **Camila**; 21.46% to save	**Taty**; **Braga**; 40.34% to save	**Paula**; **Folhas**; 24.91% to save	**André**; **Drika**; 29.72% to save	**Ju**; **Manga**; 42.41% to save	**Mariana**; **Daniel**; 42.99% to win
Saved	**Lucas**; **Camila**; 78.71% to save	**Nicole**; **Bimbi**; 64.47% to save	**Taty**; **Braga**; 62.64% to save	**André**; **Drika**; 69.14% to save	**Taty**; **Braga**; 57.00% to save	**André**; **Drika**; 51.90% to save	**Debby**; **Leandro**; 31.06% to re-enter	**Taty**; **Braga**; 77.44% to save	**Mariana**; **Daniel**; 29.20% to save	**Nicole**; **Bimbi**; 59.66% to save	**André**; **Drika**; 32.24% to save	**Nicole**; **Bimbi**; 70.28% to save	**Nicole**; **Bimbi**; 57.59% to save	**Nicole**; **Bimbi**; 48.60% to win
Saved	**Lucas**; **Camila**; 78.71% to save	**Nicole**; **Bimbi**; 64.47% to save	**Taty**; **Braga**; 62.64% to save	**André**; **Drika**; 69.14% to save	**Taty**; **Braga**; 57.00% to save	**André**; **Drika**; 51.90% to save	**Marcelo**; **Elaine**; 15.60% to re-enter	**Taty**; **Braga**; 77.44% to save	**Mariana**; **Daniel**; 29.20% to save	**Nicole**; **Bimbi**; 59.66% to save	**André**; **Drika**; 32.24% to save	**Nicole**; **Bimbi**; 70.28% to save	**Nicole**; **Bimbi**; 57.59% to save	**Nicole**; **Bimbi**; 48.60% to win
Saved	**Lucas**; **Camila**; 78.71% to save	**Nicole**; **Bimbi**; 64.47% to save	**Taty**; **Braga**; 62.64% to save	**André**; **Drika**; 69.14% to save	**Taty**; **Braga**; 57.00% to save	**André**; **Drika**; 51.90% to save	**Faby**; **Enrico**; 8.14% to re-enter	**Taty**; **Braga**; 77.44% to save	**Taty**; **Braga**; 49.34% to save	**Nicole**; **Bimbi**; 59.66% to save	**Clara**; **Coelho**; 42.85% to save	**Nicole**; **Bimbi**; 70.28% to save	**Nicole**; **Bimbi**; 57.59% to save	**Nicole**; **Bimbi**; 48.60% to win
Saved	**Lucas**; **Camila**; 78.71% to save	**Nicole**; **Bimbi**; 64.47% to save	**Taty**; **Braga**; 62.64% to save	**André**; **Drika**; 69.14% to save	**Taty**; **Braga**; 57.00% to save	**André**; **Drika**; 51.90% to save	**Maikel**; **Jackie**; 6.26% to re-enter	**Taty**; **Braga**; 77.44% to save	**Taty**; **Braga**; 49.34% to save	**Nicole**; **Bimbi**; 59.66% to save	**Clara**; **Coelho**; 42.85% to save	**Nicole**; **Bimbi**; 70.28% to save	**Nicole**; **Bimbi**; 57.59% to save	**Nicole**; **Bimbi**; 48.60% to win

==== Notes ====
- **^Note 1**: Couples' challenge winners Nicole & Bimbi used their Special power to overrule the house's vote (Debby & Leandro) and directly save one of the other two nominees from the public vote (Maikel & Jackie).
- **^Note 2**: Couples' challenge winners Clara & Coelho's vote to save Paula & Folhas was counted as two due to the use of their Special power.
- **^Note 3**: After Nicole & Bimbi's elimination, all previous eliminated couples received a chance to return through a live Wildcard couples' challenge. Nicole & Bimbi won the challenge and returned to the game. Then, Gugu Liberato announced that a second couple would also return, this time by public vote. Kamilla & Eliéser received the most votes with 38.94% and came back to the competition as well. As result, Debby & Leandro (31.06%), Marcelo & Elaine (15.60%), Faby & Enrico (8.14%) and Maikel & Jackie (6.26%) left the game for good.
- **^Note 4**: Couples' challenge winners Clara & Coelho used their Special power to ban Ju & Manga and Paula & Folhas from casting their votes.
- **^Note 5**: Couples' challenge winners Ju & Manga used their Special power to overrule the house's vote (Mariana & Daniel) and send all three nominated couples to the public vote. Taty & Braga were saved first with 49.34%, followed by Mariana & Daniel with 29.20%.
- **^Note 6**: Couples' challenge winners Nicole & Bimbi used their Special power to overrule the house's vote (Clara & Coelho) and send all three nominated couples to the public vote. André & Drika were saved first with 32.24%, followed by Clara & Coelho with 42.85%.
- **^Note 7**: Couples' challenge winners Clara & Coelho automatically became the first finalists of the season. On elimination night, they cast the sole vote to save Mariana & Daniel, with Ju & Manga and Nicole & Bimbi send to the public vote to determine the third finalists.
- **^Note 8**: For the final, the public votes for the couple they want to win Power Couple Brasil 4.

=== Room status ===
	Week 1	Week 2	Week 3	Week 4	Week 5	Week 6	Week 7	Week 8	Week 9	Week 10	Week 11	Week 12	Week 13
**Power** **suite**	Mariana; Daniel	Mariana; Daniel	Ju; Manga	Paula; Folhas	Nicole; Bimbi	Lucas; Camila	Ju; Manga	Ju; Manga	Ju; Manga	Mariana; Daniel	Mariana; Daniel	Mariana; Daniel	Mariana; Daniel
**Jazz** **suite**	Kamilla; Eliéser	Taty; Braga	Nicole; Bimbi	Taty; Braga	Maikel; Jackie	Clara; Coelho	Mariana; Daniel	André; Drika	Taty; Braga	Clara; Coelho	Ju; Manga	Clara; Coelho	Clara; Coelho
**Samba** **suite**	André; Drika	Paula; Folhas	Maikel; Jackie	Mariana; Daniel	Clara; Coelho	Ju; Manga	Clara; Coelho	Lucas; Camila	Clara; Coelho	Paula; Folhas	Clara; Coelho	Ju; Manga	
**Reggae** **suite**	Debby; Leandro	Lucas; Camila	Debby; Leandro	André; Drika	André; Drika	Paula; Folhas	Paula; Folhas	Clara; Coelho	Paula; Folhas	Ju; Manga	André; Drika		
**Disco** **suite**	Nicole; Bimbi	Ju; Manga	Clara; Coelho	Kamilla; Eliéser	Lucas; Camila	Mariana; Daniel	Taty; Braga	Nicole; Bimbi	André; Drika	Nicole; Bimbi			
**Sertanejo**	Faby; Enrico	Nicole; Bimbi	Lucas; Camila	Lucas; Camila	Mariana; Daniel	André; Drika	André; Drika	Paula; Folhas	Nicole; Bimbi				
**Rock**	Clara; Coelho	Kamilla; Eliéser	Taty; Braga	Ju; Manga	Taty; Braga	Nicole; Bimbi	Nicole; Bimbi	Mariana; Daniel					
**Hip Hop**	Maikel; Jackie	Maikel; Jackie	Kamilla; Eliéser	Nicole; Bimbi	Ju; Manga								
**Opera**	Lucas; Camila	André; Drika	Paula; Folhas	Clara; Coelho									
**Squeeze**	Taty; Braga	Marcelo; Elaine	André; Drika	Maikel; Jackie	Paula; Folhas	Taty; Braga	Lucas; Camila	Taty; Braga	Mariana; Daniel	André; Drika	Nicole; Bimbi	Nicole; Bimbi	Nicole; Bimbi
Living room	Ju; Manga	Clara; Coelho	Mariana; Daniel				Kamilla; Eliéser						
Living room	Paula; Folhas												
**Tent**	Marcelo; Elaine	Debby; Leandro											

== Ratings and reception ==
=== Brazilian ratings ===
All numbers are in points and provided by Kantar Ibope Media.

Week	First air date	Last air date	Timeslot (BRT)	Daily SP viewers (in points)					SP viewers (in points)	BR viewers (in points)	Ref.
Week	First air date	Last air date	Timeslot (BRT)	Mon	Tue	Wed	Thu	Fri	SP viewers (in points)	BR viewers (in points)	Ref.
1	April 30, 2019	May 3, 2019	Monday to Friday; 10:30 p.m.	—	7.7	7.5	7.6	7.4	7.6	6.7	
2	May 6, 2019	May 10, 2019	Monday to Friday; 10:30 p.m.	6.1	6.6	8.0	7.6	8.2	7.3	—N/a	
3	May 13, 2019	May 17, 2019	Monday to Friday; 10:30 p.m.	5.5	6.9	6.9	6.6	6.7	6.5	—N/a	
4	May 20, 2019	May 24, 2019	Monday to Friday; 10:30 p.m.	6.4	7.2	7.8	7.3	7.8	7.3	6.3	
5	May 27, 2019	May 31, 2019	Monday to Friday; 10:30 p.m.	6.6	7.1	7.2	7.2	7.9	7.2	—N/a	
6	June 3, 2019	June 7, 2019	Monday to Friday; 10:30 p.m.	6.8	6.1	6.5	7.0	7.8	6.8	—N/a	
7	June 10, 2019	June 14, 2019	Monday to Friday; 10:30 p.m.	7.2	7.8	7.9	8.5	7.2	7.7	—N/a	
8	June 17, 2019	June 21, 2019	Monday to Friday; 10:30 p.m.	6.5	6.9	6.5	7.1	8.0	7.0	6.0	
9	June 24, 2019	June 28, 2019	Monday to Friday; 10:30 p.m.	6.4	7.0	7.4	5.7	8.5	7.0	—N/a	
10	July 1, 2019	July 5, 2019	Monday to Friday; 10:30 p.m.	6.6	5.3	8.5	7.1	7.8	7.0	5.9	
11	July 8, 2019	July 12, 2019	Monday to Friday; 10:30 p.m.	5.6	6.8	8.6	7.3	7.6	7.2	6.2	
12	July 15, 2019	July 19, 2019	Monday to Friday; 10:30 p.m.	6.8	7.3	7.3	6.9	7.9	7.3	6.3	
13	July 22, 2019	July 25, 2019	Monday to Friday; 10:30 p.m.	5.6	6.3	7.0	7.9	—	6.7	—N/a	

- In 2019, each point represents 254.892 households in 15 market cities in Brazil (73.015 households in São Paulo).
