= De Férias com o Ex season 1 =

De Férias com o Ex
- Season 1
- No. of housemates: 20
- Location: Pipa Beach, Rio Grande do Norte
- No. of episodes: 10

Release
- Original network: MTV
- Original release: October 13 – December 15, 2016

Season chronology
- Next → Season 2

The first season of De Férias com o Ex, a Brazilian television programme, began airing on 13 October 2016 on MTV. The series concluded on 15 December 2016 after 10 episodes. The show was announced in July 2016.

Gabi Prado later returned to the beach during the second series, this time as main cast.

== Cast ==
The official list of cast members was released on 5 September 2016 and includes five single boys: Alex Merencio, André Coelho, Guilherme Araújo, Héric Henrique and Iure Meirelles; as well as five single girls; Anna Clara Maia, Gabrieli Diniz, Michelle Alveia, Nathalia Andrade and Raphaela Sirena.

The official cast members all arrived in the first episode of the series, but would be joined by their exes one-by-one over the series.

- **Bold** indicates original cast member; all other cast were brought into the series as an ex.

| Episodes | Name | Age (Note: Age when first appearing on the show.) | Hometown | Exs |
|---|---|---|---|---|
| 10 | **Alex Merencio** | 25 | Toledo, Paraná | Jennifer Caivano, Keroline Tu |
| 10 | **André Coelho** | 29 | Brasília, DF | Gabriela Brandt, Gabrielle Prado |
| 10 | **Anna Clara Maia** | 23 | Rio de Janeiro, RJ | Guilherme Trestini |
| 10 | **Gabrieli Diniz** | 22 | Niterói, Rio de Janeiro | Elthon Charles |
| 10 | **Guilherme Araújo** | 28 | São Paulo, SP | —N/a |
| 10 | **Héric Henrique** | 31 | Rio de Janeiro, RJ | Lis Aguiar |
| 10 | **Iure Meirelles** | 26 | Rio de Janeiro, RJ | —N/a |
| 10 | **Michelle Alveia** | 23 | São Paulo, SP | —N/a |
| 10 | **Nathalia Andrade** | 23 | Rio de Janeiro, RJ | —N/a |
| 10 | **Raphaela Sirena** | 27 | Porto Alegre, Rio Grande do Sul | Gabriel Lago |
| 10 | Gabriela Brandt | 20 | São Paulo, SP | André Coelho |
| 9 | Guilherme Trestini | 25 | Rio de Janeiro, RJ | Anna Clara Maia, Sofia Zuppo |
| 9 | Gabrielle Prado | 29 | Brasília, DF | André Coelho, Luis Claudio Mós |
| 7 | Lis Aguiar | 19 | Rio de Janeiro, RJ | Heric Henrique |
| 6 | Jennifer Caivano | 19 | São Carlos, São Paulo | Alex Merencio |
| 5 | Gabriel Lago | 25 | Salvador, Bahia | Raphaela Sirena |
| 4 | Elthon Charles | 26 | Rio de Janeiro, RJ | Gabrieli Diniz |
| 3 | Keroline Tu | 28 | São Carlos, São Paulo | Alex Merencio |
| 3 | Luis Claudio Mós | 28 | Brasília, DF | Gabrielle Prado |
| 2 | Sofia Zuppo | 25 | São Paulo, SP | Guilherme Trestini |

=== Duration of cast ===
| Cast members | Episodes | | | | | | | | | |
| Cast members | 1 | 2 | 3 | 4 | 5 | 6 | 7 | 8 | 9 | 10 |
|---|---|---|---|---|---|---|---|---|---|---|
| Alex | | | | | | | | | | |
| André | | | | | | | | | | |
| Anna | | | | | | | | | | |
| Gabrieli | | | | | | | | | | |
| Gui A | | | | | | | | | | |
| Héric | | | | | | | | | | |
| Iure | | | | | | | | | | |
| Michelle | | | | | | | | | | |
| Nathalia | | | | | | | | | | |
| Raphaela | | | | | | | | | | |
| Gabi B | | | | | | | | | | |
| Gui T | | | | | | | | | | |
| Gabi P | | | | | | | | | | |
| Lis | | | | | | | | | | |
| Jennifer | | | | | | | | | | |
| Gabriel | | | | | | | | | | |
| Elthon | | | | | | | | | | |
| Keroline | | | | | | | | | | |
| Luis Claudio | | | | | | | | | | |
| Sofia | | | | | | | | | | |

Key: = "Cast member" is featured in this episode
Key: = "Cast member" arrives on the beach
Key: = "Cast member" has an ex arrive on the beach
Key: = "Cast member" arrives on the beach and has an ex arrive during the same episode
Key: = "Cast member" does not feature in this episode

== Future Appearances ==
Gabrielle Prado, returned the following season, and in 2018, appeared in A Fazenda 10, she finished in 11th place in the competition.

In 2019, Anna Clara Maia and André Coelho appeared in Power Couple Brasil 4, they finished in 3rd place. Guilherme Araújo, returned in De Férias com o Ex Brasil: Celebs as original cast member.

In 2021, Guilherme Araújo appeared in A Fazenda 13, he finished in 11th place in the competition.

In 2024, Lis Aguilar returned as a single for the first season of De Férias com o Ex Diretoria.

In 2026, Elthon Charles returned for the second season of De Férias com o Ex Diretoria as a main cast member.

== Episodes ==
| No. overall | No. in season | Title | Original release date | Duration |
|---|---|---|---|---|
| 1 | 1 | "Episode 1" | 13 October 2016 | 60 minutes |
| 2 | 2 | "Episode 2" | 20 October 2016 | 60 minutes |
| 3 | 3 | "Episode 3" | 27 October 2016 | 60 minutes |
| 4 | 4 | "Episode 4" | 3 November 2016 | 60 minutes |
| 5 | 5 | "Episode 5" | 10 November 2016 | 60 minutes |
| 6 | 6 | "Episode 6" | 17 November 2016 | 60 minutes |
| 7 | 7 | "Episode 7" | 24 November 2016 | 60 minutes |
| 8 | 8 | "Episode 8" | 1 December 2016 | 60 minutes |
| 9 | 9 | "Episode 9" | 8 December 2016 | 60 minutes |
| 10 | 10 | "Episode 10" | 15 December 2016 | 60 minutes |
