= Ilha Record 1 =

- Season 1
- Hosted by: Sabrina Sato
- No. of days: 36
- No. of contestants: 13
- Winner: Any Borges
- Runner-up: Pyong Lee
- No. of episodes: 40

Release
- Original network: RecordTV
- Original release: July 26 – September 9, 2021

Additional information
- Filming dates: June 1 – July 6, 2021

Season chronology
- Next → Season 2

The first season of Ilha Record premiered on Monday, July 26, 2021, at 10:30 p.m. on RecordTV.

The show features a group of celebrities, known as Explorers, living together on a desert island and competing against each other in extreme challenges to avoid being exiled and continue their quest for lost treasures and the grand prize of R$500.000. Prior to the live finale, a public vote is held to determine who would become the season's Favorite Explorer and win the special prize of R$250.000. The inaugural season of Ilha Record was filmed in Paraty, Rio de Janeiro from June 1 to July 6, 2021.

Any Borges won competition after defeating Pyong Lee at the Island's final treasure hunt and took home the grand prize of R$500.000. Mirella Santos won the public's special prize of R$250.000 with 79.33% of the final vote against Nadja Pessoa. In addition, Pyong Lee received R$100.000 as runner-up, while Claudinho Matos and Nanah Damasceno earned R$10.000 each for being part of Any's crew in the final.

== Cast ==
=== Explorers ===
The celebrities were officially revealed by RecordTV on May 27, 2021.

Celebrity	Age	Hometown	Known for	Original crew	Status	Finish
Dinei; Returned on August 19	50	São Paulo	Former football player	Emerald	1st Exiled on July 29, 2021	Returned
Mirella Santos; Returned on August 19	21	Jaboatão	Dancer	Ruby	2nd Exiled on August 3, 2021	Returned
Lucas Selfie	26	São Paulo	TV host	Ruby	3rd Exiled on August 5, 2021	13th
Claudinho Matos	28	Rio de Janeiro	Digital influencer	Ruby	4th Exiled on August 11, 2021	12th
MC Negão da BL	23	Magé	Singer	Emerald	5th Exiled on August 12, 2021	11th
Nanah Damasceno	34	São Paulo	Singer	Emerald	6th Exiled on August 19, 2021	10th
Thomaz Costa	20	São Paulo	Actor	Emerald	7th Exiled on August 19, 2021	9th
Antonela Avellaneda	38	(Argentina) La Plata	Model	Emerald	8th Exiled on August 26, 2021	8th
Mirella Santos	21	Jaboatão	Dancer	Ruby	9th Exiled on September 2, 2021	7th
Nadja Pessoa	33	Recife	Digital influencer	Ruby	10th Exiled on September 4, 2021	6th
Dinei	50	São Paulo	Former football player	Emerald	11th Exiled on September 6, 2021	5th
Valesca Popozuda	42	Rio de Janeiro	Singer	Emerald	12th Exiled on September 6, 2021	4th
Laura Keller	34	Porto Alegre	Actress	Ruby	13th Exiled on September 6, 2021	3rd
Pyong Lee	28	São Paulo	Digital influencer	Emerald	Runner-up on September 9, 2021	2nd
Any Borges	26	Brasília	DJ	Ruby	Winner on September 9, 2021	1st

== Future Appearances ==
After this season, in 2022, Dinei appeared with his wife Erika Dias in Power Couple Brasil 6, they finished in 12th place in the competition.

In 2022, Thomaz Costa appeared in A Fazenda 14, he finished in 17th place in the competition.

In 2023, Nadja Pessoa appeared in A Fazenda 15, she finished in 7th place in the competition.

== The game ==
Distributed pieces of map	T Total maps combined	Won the pieces of map (adds the maps sum)	Didn't won the pieces of map (kept the maps sum)	Received the exile's pieces of map (adds the maps sum)

=== Maps progress ===
		Cycle 1	Cycle 2	Cycle 3	Cycle 4	Cycle 5	Cycle 6	Cycle 7	
		Cycle 1	Cycle 2	Cycle 3	Cycle 4	Cycle 5	Cycle 6	Day 33	Finale
Sum of maps		17	4	3	3	4	2	2	Jackpot
Maps
Any		1	1	0	0	0	0	1	18
Any	T	1	3	4	5	5	5	18	18
Pyong		2	0	1	0	0	1	1	17
Pyong	T	2	3	4	4	8	13	17	17
Laura		1	0	0	0	1	0	0	
Laura	T	1	1	1	1	2	7	7	
Valesca		1	1	1	0	0	0	0	
Valesca	T	1	2	3	3	3	3	3	
Dinei		1			—	1	0	0	
Dinei	T	1			4	5	5	5	
Nadja		1	0	1	1	0	1		
Nadja	T	1	1	2	3	3	4		
Mirella		0	0		—	1	0		
Mirella	T	1	1		4	5	5		
Antonela		2	0	0	1	1			
Antonela	T	2	2	2	3	4			
Thomaz		3	0	0	1				
Thomaz	T	3	3	5	6				
Nanah		1	1	0	0				
Nanah	T	1	2	3	3				
Negão da BL		1	1	0					
Negão da BL	T	1	2	2					
Claudinho		1	0	0					
Claudinho	T	2	2	2					
Lucas		1	0						
Lucas	T	1	1						

=== Voting history ===
	Cycle 1	Cycle 2		Cycle 3		Cycle 4		Cycle 5	Cycle 6		Cycle 7	
	Day 3	Day 7	Day 8	Day 13		Day 18	Day 19	Day 23	Day 28	Day 31	Day 33	Finale
	Day 3	Day 7	Day 8	Round 1	Round 2	Day 18	Day 19	Day 23	Day 28	Day 31	Day 33	Finale
Commanders	Claudinho; Thomaz	(none)	Claudinho; Nanah	Pyong; Any	(none)	Any; Thomaz	(none)	Any; Mirella	Dinei; Pyong	(none)		Pyong; Any
Winning Commander	Thomaz	(none)	Nanah	Pyong	(none)	Thomaz	(none)	Mirella	Pyong	(none)		Any
Nominated (Commander)	Dinei	(none)	Pyong	Negão da BL	(none)	Any	(none)	Antonela	Laura	(none)		(none)
Nominated (Explorers)	Claudinho	(none)	Lucas	Claudinho; Thomaz	(none)	Thomaz; Nanah	(none)	Pyong	Mirella	(none)		(none)
Any	Nadja	Mirella	Thomaz	Thomaz	Thomaz	Nanah	Not eligible	Pyong	Mirella	Not eligible	Nominated	Winner (Day 36)
Pyong	Claudinho	Mirella	Lucas	Claudinho	Claudinho	Nanah	Not eligible	Any	Mirella; Mirella	Immune	Nominated	Runner-up (Day 36)
Laura	Nadja	Mirella	Lucas	Nanah	Claudinho	Pyong	Not eligible	Pyong	Pyong	Immune	Nominated	Exiled (Day 33)
Valesca	Claudinho	Mirella	Lucas	Claudinho	Claudinho	Nanah	Not eligible	Pyong	Pyong; Pyong	Not eligible	Nominated	Exiled (Day 33)
Dinei	Claudinho	Exiled (Day 4)				Thomaz	Returned	~~Pyong~~	Any	Not eligible	Nominated	Re-Exiled (Day 33)
Nadja	Claudinho	Mirella	Lucas	Claudinho	Claudinho	Nanah	Not eligible	Any	Mirella	Not eligible	Exiled (Day 31)	
Mirella	Lucas	Valesca	Exiled (Day 7)			Thomaz	Returned	~~Pyong~~; Pyong	Any	Nadja	Re-Exiled (Day 29)	
Antonela	Claudinho	Mirella	Lucas	Claudinho	Claudinho	Nanah	Not eligible	Any	Exiled (Day 24)	Dinei	Exiled (Day 24)	
Thomaz	Claudinho	Mirella	Lucas	Nanah	Not eligible	Nanah	Exiled (Day 19)			Dinei	Exiled (Day 19)	
Nanah	Lucas	Mirella	Thomaz	Thomaz	Thomaz	Pyong	Exiled (Day 19)			Nadja	Exiled (Day 19)	
Negão da BL	Claudinho	Mirella; Nadja	Thomaz	Thomaz	Not eligible	Thomaz	Exiled (Day 14)			Nadja	Exiled (Day 14)	
Claudinho	Nadja	Mirella	Thomaz	Thomaz	Not eligible	Thomaz	Exiled (Day 13)			Nadja	Exiled (Day 13)	
Lucas	Mirella	Mirella	Thomaz	Exiled (Day 9)		Thomaz	Exiled (Day 9)			Nadja	Exiled (Day 9)	
Notes	(none)	1	(none)	2		3, 4		5, 6	7, 8	9	10	11, 12
Voted into the Arena	Claudinho; Dinei	(none)	Lucas; Pyong	(none)	~~Claudinho~~; Negão da BL; Thomaz	Any; Nanah; Thomaz	Claudinho; Dinei; Lucas; Mirella; Negão da BL	Antonela; Pyong	Laura; Mirella	Any; Dinei; Nadja; Valesca	Any; Dinei; Laura; Pyong; Valesca	Any; Pyong
Exiled	Dinei; Lost the Arena duel	Mirella; 11 of 13 votes to the twist	Lucas; Lost the Arena duel	Negão da BL; Pyong's choice to nominate	Claudinho; 5 of 7 votes to exile	Nanah; Lost the Arena duel	Claudinho; Lost the Arena duel	Antonela; Lost the Arena duel	Mirella; Lost the Arena duel	Nadja; 5 of 7 votes to exile	Dinei; Lost the Challenge	Pyong; 483 points to win
Exiled	Dinei; Lost the Arena duel	Mirella; 11 of 13 votes to the twist	Lucas; Lost the Arena duel	Claudinho; 4 of 10 votes to nominate	Claudinho; 5 of 7 votes to exile	Nanah; Lost the Arena duel	Lucas; Lost the Arena duel	Antonela; Lost the Arena duel	Mirella; Lost the Arena duel	Nadja; 5 of 7 votes to exile	Valesca; Lost the Challenge	Pyong; 483 points to win
Exiled	Dinei; Lost the Arena duel	Mirella; 11 of 13 votes to the twist	Lucas; Lost the Arena duel	Claudinho; 4 of 10 votes to nominate	Negão da BL; Lost the Arena duel	Thomaz; Lost the Arena duel	Lucas; Lost the Arena duel	Antonela; Lost the Arena duel	Mirella; Lost the Arena duel	Nadja; 5 of 7 votes to exile	Valesca; Lost the Challenge	Pyong; 483 points to win
Exiled	Dinei; Lost the Arena duel	Mirella; 11 of 13 votes to the twist	Lucas; Lost the Arena duel	Thomaz; 4 of 10 votes to nominate	Negão da BL; Lost the Arena duel	Thomaz; Lost the Arena duel	Negão da BL; Lost the Arena duel	Antonela; Lost the Arena duel	Mirella; Lost the Arena duel	Nadja; 5 of 7 votes to exile	Laura; Lost the Challenge	Pyong; 483 points to win
Saved	Claudinho; Won the Arena duel	Nadja; 1 of 13 votes to the twist	Pyong; Won the Arena duel	Nanah; 2 of 10 votes to nominate	Thomaz; Won the Arena duel	Any; Won the Arena duel	Mirella; Won the Arena duel	Pyong; Won the Arena duel	Laura; Won the Arena duel	Dinei; 2 of 7 votes to exile	Any; Won the Challenge	Any; 567 points to win
Saved	Claudinho; Won the Arena duel	Nadja; 1 of 13 votes to the twist	Pyong; Won the Arena duel	Nanah; 2 of 10 votes to nominate	Thomaz; Won the Arena duel	Any; Won the Arena duel	Mirella; Won the Arena duel	Pyong; Won the Arena duel	Laura; Won the Arena duel	Any; 0 of 7 votes to exile	Any; Won the Challenge	Any; 567 points to win
Saved	Claudinho; Won the Arena duel	Valesca; 1 of 13 votes to the twist	Pyong; Won the Arena duel	Nanah; 2 of 10 votes to nominate	Thomaz; Won the Arena duel	Any; Won the Arena duel	Dinei; Duel winners' choice	Pyong; Won the Arena duel	Laura; Won the Arena duel	Any; 0 of 7 votes to exile	Pyong; Won the Challenge	Any; 567 points to win
Saved	Claudinho; Won the Arena duel	Valesca; 1 of 13 votes to the twist	Pyong; Won the Arena duel	Nanah; 2 of 10 votes to nominate	Thomaz; Won the Arena duel	Any; Won the Arena duel	Dinei; Duel winners' choice	Pyong; Won the Arena duel	Laura; Won the Arena duel	Valesca; 0 of 7 votes to exile	Pyong; Won the Challenge	Any; 567 points to win

==== Notes ====
- ^Note 1 : In a twist that simulated the marine food chain, the explorer most voted as the Shark (Claudinho) received a R$15.000 prize, while the explorer most voted as the Seaweed was automatically exiled (Mirella).
- ^Note 2 : The Winning Commander's nomination (Negão da BL), alongside the two explorers who received the most votes from the Villa (Claudinho and Thomaz), faced a surprise exiled vote. Claudinho was exiled by a 5–2–0 vote, over Thomaz and Negão da BL, respectively, who in turn went to compete in the Arena duel.
- ^Note 3 : The explorers living in the Exile had the power to vote an explorer from the Villa into the Arena. They voted Thomaz, who, as Winning Commander, nominated Any. Nanah received the most votes from the Villa and joined both of them in the Arena duel.
- ^Note 4 : The Arena duel was done in pairs: Any & Mirella, Claudinho & Lucas, Dinei & Thomaz and Nanah & Negão da BL. Any & Mirella won the duel, with Mirella returning to the Villa as well and both becoming the new Commanders in Cycle 5. The pair also had to choose an explorer to return to the game. They chose Dinei.
- ^Note 5 : The explorers living in Exile had to choose one power to be used during this cycle's nominations between two options: In the first option, the Winning Commander's nominee will have the power to give immunity to another explorer, while in the second option, the explorer who received the most votes from the Villa will be able to nullify the vote of two other explorers. The second option was chosen.
- ^Note 6 : Pyong received the most votes from the Villa with five votes. As result, he won the power to nullify the vote of two other explorers. He chose Dinei and Mirella's votes, bringing his vote total down to three votes, tying him with Any. Mirella, as Winning Commander, had the casting vote and nominated Pyong into the Arena duel.
- ^Note 7 : The explorers living in the Exile had to choose an explorer from the Villa to cast vote twice during this cycle's final nominations. They chose Valesca, who decided to cast both of her votes on Pyong.
- ^Note 8 : Mirella and Pyong received the most votes from the Villa with three votes each. Pyong, as Winning Commander, had the casting vote and nominated Mirella into the Arena duel.
- ^Note 9 : The explorers living in the Exile had to choose an explorer from the Villa (except Pyong and Laura who were immune as the two with the most maps) to be exiled. Nadja was exiled by a 5–2–0–0 vote, over Dinei, Any and Valesca, respectively.
- ^Note 10 : The final five explorers competed in an endurance challenge for a place in the Finale. The three final challenge losers would be automatically exiled. Dinei, Valesca and Laura lost the challenge and were automatically exiled, meaning Any and Pyong became the season's finalists.
- ^Note 11 : For their final treasure hunt at the Island, Any and Pyong were both given a support crew of previously exiled explorers. Any, as Emerald's Commander, chose Claudinho and Nanah, while Pyong, as Ruby's Commander, chose Antonella and Thomaz.
- ^Note 12 : For the final, the public votes to determine the values of the gems collected by the finalists between boxes A, B and C. Box B was the most voted, so the blue stone was worth 3 points; then Box A, with the yellow stone, was worth 2 points; and finally, Box C, with the pink stone, was worth 1 point. In the end, Any got 567 points against Pyong's 483, winning the competition.

=== Exiles' power ===
Cycle	Exiled(s)	Consequences
2	Dinei	Choose the cycle's second Commander. → Nanah
2	Dinei; Mirella	Reveal an explorer's vote to all explorers from the Villa. → Pyong
3	Dinei; Mirella; Lucas	Assemble the cycle's two crews. The crew that didn't have a Commander would choose him among themselves. → Pyong, Antonela, Nadja, Thomaz, Valesca (Emerald Crew); Any, Claudinho, Laura, Nanah, Negão da BL (Ruby Crew)
3	Dinei; Mirella; Lucas	Swap two explorers from their crew. → Claudinho for Thomaz
4	Dinei; Mirella; Lucas; Claudinho; Negão da BL	Assemble the cycle's two crews and choose the crew's Commander opposing the saved explorer of the Arena duel. → Thomaz, Valesca, Nadja, Antonela (Emerald Crew); Any, Nanah, Pyong, Laura (Ruby Crew)
4	Dinei; Mirella; Lucas; Claudinho; Negão da BL	Nominate an explorer from the Villa into the Arena duel. → Thomaz
5	Lucas; Claudinho; Negão da BL; Nanah; Thomaz	Choose one of the crews to have an advantage in the Crews' challenge. → Emerald Crew
5	Lucas; Claudinho; Negão da BL; Nanah; Thomaz	Choose between the Winning Commander's nominee will have the power to give immunity to another explorer or the explorer who received the most votes from the Villa will be able to nullify the vote of two other explorers. → Pyong
6	Lucas; Claudinho; Negão da BL; Nanah; Thomaz; Antonela	Choose an exiled to help the crew with fewer explorers in the Crews' challenge and who must choose the crew's Commander. → Lucas
6	Lucas; Claudinho; Negão da BL; Nanah; Thomaz; Antonela	Choose an explorer to vote twice. → Valesca
6	Lucas; Claudinho; Negão da BL; Nanah; Thomaz; Antonela; Mirella	Choose an explorer from the Villa to be exiled. → Nadja

=== Crew status ===
	Cycle 1	Cycle 2	Cycle 3		Cycle 4	Cycle 5	Cycle 6	Cycle 7
	Cycle 1	Cycle 2	Day 11	Day 13	Cycle 4	Cycle 5	Cycle 6	Finale
Any	Ruby	Emerald	Emerald		Ruby	Ruby	Ruby	Emerald
Pyong	Emerald	Emerald	Ruby		Ruby	Ruby	Emerald	Ruby
Laura	Ruby	Emerald	Emerald		Ruby	Emerald	Emerald	
Valesca	Emerald	Emerald	Ruby		Emerald	Ruby	Emerald	
Dinei	Emerald					Emerald	Ruby	
Nadja	Ruby	Ruby	Ruby		Emerald	Ruby	Emerald	
Mirella	Ruby	Ruby				Emerald	Ruby	
Antonela	Emerald	Ruby	Ruby		Emerald	Emerald		Ruby
Thomaz	Emerald	Ruby	~~Ruby~~	Emerald	Emerald			Ruby
Nanah	Emerald	Emerald	Emerald		Ruby			Emerald
Negão da BL	Emerald	Emerald	Emerald					
Claudinho	Ruby	Ruby	~~Emerald~~	Ruby				Emerald
Lucas	Ruby	Ruby					Ruby	

=== Public' favorite's results ===
Placing	Explorer	Percentage
1	Mirella	79.33% to win
2	Nadja	20.67% (out of 2)
3	Laura	11.35% (out of 13)
4	Negão da BL	6.44% (out of 13)
5	Pyong	3.96% (out of 13)
6	Lucas	3.51% (out of 13)
7	Thomaz	2.33% (out of 13)
8	Dinei	2.18% (out of 13)
9	Nanah	1.20% (out of 13)
10	Any	1.11% (out of 13)
11	Claudinho	1.10% (out of 13)
12	Valesca	0.78% (out of 13)
13	Antonela	0.43% (out of 13)

== Ratings and reception ==
=== Brazilian ratings ===
All numbers are in points and provided by Kantar Ibope Media.

Cycle	First air date	Last air date	Timeslot (BRT)	Daily SP viewers (in points)						SP viewers (in points)	BR viewers (in points)	Ref.
Cycle	First air date	Last air date	Timeslot (BRT)	Mon	Tue	Wed	Thu	Fri	Sat	SP viewers (in points)	BR viewers (in points)	Ref.
1	July 26, 2021	July 31, 2021	Monday to Saturday; 10:30 p.m.	8.0	7.4	7.7	7.0	5.9	4.6	7.0	6.2	
2	August 2, 2021	August 7, 2021	Monday to Saturday; 10:30 p.m.	7.0	7.4	7.7	6.2	7.0	4.9	6.8	5.9	
3	August 9, 2021	August 14, 2021	Monday to Saturday; 10:30 p.m.	7.7	6.9	8.0	7.0	9.2	5.8	7.3	5.9	
4	August 16, 2021	August 21, 2021	Monday to Saturday; 10:30 p.m.	8.1	6.0	7.6	7.9	7.8	5.4	7.1	5.8	
5	August 23, 2021	August 28, 2021	Monday to Saturday; 10:30 p.m.	7.8	7.1	7.1	7.4	7.6	5.4	7.1	5.8	
6	August 30, 2021	September 5, 2021	Monday to Saturday; 10:30 p.m.	7.4	6.2	6.8	7.1	5.9	5.1	6.6	5.6	
7	September 7, 2021	September 9, 2021	Monday to Saturday; 10:30 p.m.	7.4	7.0	7.3	7.8	—	—	7.4	6.1	

- In 2021, each point represents 268.278 households in 15 market cities in Brazil (76.577 households in São Paulo).
