= De Férias com o Ex season 2 =

De Férias com o Ex
- Season 2
- No. of housemates: 21
- Location: Pipa Beach, Rio Grande do Norte
- No. of episodes: 10

Release
- Original network: MTV
- Original release: October 19 – December 21, 2017

Season chronology
- ← Previous; Season 1 Next → Season 3

The second season of De Férias com o Ex, a Brazilian television programme, began airing on 19 October 2017 on MTV. The series concluded on 21 December 2017 after 10 episodes. The series was confirmed in April 2017. The group of cast members for this series include Are You the One? Brasil series 1 contestant Thaigo Consani. It also features the return of Gabi Prado following her appearance in the first series of the show.

== Cast ==
The official list of cast members was released on 2 August 2017 and includes five single boys; Fagner Sousa, Diego Superbi, João Folsta, Nicolas Guasque and Pedro Ortega, as well as five single girls; Gabriela Domingues, Raissa Castro, Saory Cardoso, Stephanie Viegas and Gabrielle Prado.

- **Bold** indicates original cast member; all other cast were brought into the series as an ex.

| Episodes | Name | Age (Note: Age when first appearing on the show.) | Hometown | Exes |
|---|---|---|---|---|
| 10 | **Diego Supérbi** | 23 | São Paulo, SP | Scarlat Cióla |
| 10 | **Fagner Sousa** | 28 | Campinas, SP | Maria Julia Mazalli, Carol Maya, Gabrielle Prado, Raissa Castro |
| 8 | **Gabriela Domingues** | 26 | São Caetano do Sul, SP | Thaigo Consani |
| 10 | **Gabrielle Prado** | 30 | Brasília, DF | Fagner Sousa, João Paulo Andrade, Thaigo Consani |
| 10 | **João Folsta** | 22 | Bebedouro, SP | Priscila Zoo |
| 10 | **Nicolas Guasque** | 26 | Rio de Janeiro, RJ | —N/a |
| 10 | **Pedro Ortega** | 25 | Rio de Janeiro, RJ | Andressa Santos |
| 10 | **Raissa Castro** | 26 | Rio de Janeiro, RJ | Paulo Rapuano, Fagner Sousa |
| 10 | **Saory Cardoso** | 21 | Belo Horizonte, MG | —N/a |
| 10 | **Stephanie Viegas** | 25 | Rio de Janeiro, RJ | Claudio Matos, Roy Stainsack |
| 10 | Priscila Zoo | 24 | Florianópolis, SC | João Folsta |
| 9 | Claudio Matos | 24 | Rio de Janeiro, RJ | Stephanie Viegas, Mariana Costa |
| 9 | Maria Julia Mazalli | 22 | Marília, SP | Fagner Sousa |
| 8 | Carol Maya | 25 | São Paulo, SP | Fagner Sousa |
| 7 | Paulo Rapuano | 28 | Rio de Janeiro, RJ | Raissa Castro |
| 6 | João Paulo Andrade | 26 | Brasília, DF | Gabrielle Prado |
| 5 | Andressa Santos | 23 | Rio de Janeiro, RJ | Pedro Ortega |
| 5 | Thaigo Consani | 28 | São Caetano do Sul, SP | Gabriela Domingues, Gabrielle Prado |
| 3 | Scarlat Cióla | 25 | São Paulo, SP | Diego Superbi |
| 2 | Mariana Costa | 26 | Rio de Janeiro, RJ | Claudio Matos |
| 2 | Roy Stainsack | 26 | Presidente Getúlio, SC | Stephanie Viegas |

=== Duration of cast ===
| Cast members | Episodes | | | | | | | | | |
| Cast members | 1 | 2 | 3 | 4 | 5 | 6 | 7 | 8 | 9 | 10 |
|---|---|---|---|---|---|---|---|---|---|---|
| Diego | | | | | | | | | | |
| Fagner | | | | | | | | | | |
| Gabi D. | | | | | | | | | | |
| Gabi Prado | | | | | | | | | | |
| João | | | | | | | | | | |
| Nicolas | | | | | | | | | | |
| Ortega | | | | | | | | | | |
| Raissa | | | | | | | | | | |
| Saory | | | | | | | | | | |
| Stephanie | | | | | | | | | | |
| Zoo | | | | | | | | | | |
| Claudio | | | | | | | | | | |
| Maju | | | | | | | | | | |
| Carol | | | | | | | | | | |
| Paulo | | | | | | | | | | |
| J.P | | | | | | | | | | |
| Andressa | | | | | | | | | | |
| Thaigo | | | | | | | | | | |
| Scarlat | | | | | | | | | | |
| Mariana | | | | | | | | | | |
| Roy | | | | | | | | | | |

Key: = "Cast member" is featured in this episode
Key: = "Cast member" arrives on the beach
Key: = "Cast member" has an ex arrive on the beach
Key: = "Cast member" arrives on the beach and has an ex arrive during the same episode
Key: = "Cast member" leaves the beach
Key: = "Cast member" does not feature in this episode

== Future Appearances ==
After this season, Gabrielle Prado, in 2018, appeared in A Fazenda 10, she finished in 11th place in the competition.

In 2021, Claudio Matos appeared in Ilha Record 1, he finished in 12th place in the competition.

Maria Julia Mazalli appeared as an original cast member in De Férias com o ex Celebs 2 and De Férias com o Ex: Diretoria, in 2021 and 2024, respectively.

In 2023, Fagner Sousa appeared on A Grande Conquista 1, he had to compete for a place to enter in the game and he didn't enter. In 2024, appeared in De Férias com o Ex: Diretoria as an original cast member.

== Episodes ==
| No. overall | No. in season | Title | Original release date | Duration |
|---|---|---|---|---|
| 11 | 1 | "Episode 1" | 19 October 2017 | 60 minutes |
| 12 | 2 | "Episode 2" | 26 October 2017 | 60 minutes |
| 13 | 3 | "Episode 3" | 2 November 2017 | 60 minutes |
| 14 | 4 | "Episode 4" | 9 November 2017 | 60 minutes |
| 15 | 5 | "Episode 5" | 16 November 2017 | 60 minutes |
| 16 | 6 | "Episode 6" | 23 November 2017 | 60 minutes |
| 17 | 7 | "Episode 7" | 30 November 2017 | 60 minutes |
| 18 | 8 | "Episode 8" | 7 December 2017 | 60 minutes |
| 19 | 9 | "Episode 9" | 14 December 2017 | 60 minutes |
| 20 | 10 | "Episode 10" | 21 December 2017 | 60 minutes |
