= De Férias com o Ex season 3 =

De Férias com o Ex
- Season 3
- No. of housemates: 23
- Location: Ilhéus, Bahia
- No. of episodes: 12

Release
- Original network: MTV
- Original release: September 27 – December 13, 2018

Season chronology
- ← Previous; Season 2 Next → Season 4

The third series of De Férias com o Ex, a Brazilian television programme, began airing on 27 September 2018 on MTV. The series was confirmed on 17 May 2018. The cast members for this series were confirmed on 6 September 2018, and include Super Shore star Igor Freitas, A Casa series 1 contestants Mauricio Miguel and Vinicius Büttel. Andressa Alves also joined the series as an ex having already appeared in third series of Are You the One? Brasil as well as Augusto Nogueira, who appeared in Conexao Models.

== Cast ==
- **Bold** indicates original cast member; all other cast were brought into the series as an ex.

| Episodes | Name | Age (Note: Age when first appearing on the show.) | Hometown | Ex |
|---|---|---|---|---|
| 12 | **Anny Borges** | 23 | Brasília, DF | — |
| 12 | **Felipe Gandy** | 28 | Cabo Frio, RJ | Andressa Alves |
| 12 | **Fernanda Mincarone** | 22 | Porto Alegre, RS | Augusto Nogueira, Arthur Jobim |
| 12 | **Giovana Freitas** | 21 | Recife, PE | Fernando Lobo |
| 9 | **Igor Freitas** | 28 | São João Nepomuceno, MG | Renata Dias, Daniela Seta |
| 12 | **Mauricio Miguel** | 26 | São Paulo, SP | Tatiana Dias, Luiza Aragão, Melissa Gropo |
| 12 | **Mylena Delatorre** | 23 | Bom Jesus de Itabapoana, RJ | — |
| 12 | **Paulo Philippe** | 27 | Rio de Janeiro, RJ | — |
| 12 | **Vinicius Büttel** | 27 | São Paulo, SP | Martina Sanzi |
| 12 | **Yasmin Burihan** | 28 | São Paulo, SP | Guilherme Franciscon |
| 12 | Renata Dias | 28 | Rio de Janeiro, RJ | Igor Freitas, Felipe Ribeiro |
| 11 | Andressa Alves | 24 | Crisópolis, BA | Felipe Gandy |
| 10 | Augusto Nogueira | 25 | Porto Alegre, RS | Fernanda Mincarone |
| 9 | Tatiana Dias | 28 | São Paulo, SP | Mauricio Miguel, Leonardo Balthazar |
| 1 | Luiza Aragão | 30 | Brasília, DF | Mauricio Miguel |
| 8 | Guilherme Franciscon | 29 | São Paulo, SP | Yasmin Burihan |
| 8 | Felipe Ribeiro | 26 | Rio de Janeiro, RJ | Renata Dias |
| 6 | Daniela Seta | 28 | São Paulo, SP | Igor Freitas, Leonardo Balthazar |
| 6 | Martina Sanzi | 25 | Porto Alegre, RS | Vinicius Buttel |
| 5 | Arthur Jobim | 24 | Porto Alegre, RS | Fernanda Mincarone |
| 4 | Fernando Lobo | 20 | Recife, PE | Giovana Freitas |
| 3 | Melissa Gropo | 25 | Santos, SP | Maurício Miguel |
| 2 | Leonardo Balthazar | 25 | São Paulo, SP | Tatiana Dias, Daniela Seta |

=== Cast duration ===
| Cast members | Episodes | | | | | | | | | | | |
| Cast members | 1 | 2 | 3 | 4 | 5 | 6 | 7 | 8 | 9 | 10 | 11 | 12 |
|---|---|---|---|---|---|---|---|---|---|---|---|---|
| Any | | | | | | | | | | | | |
| Fernanda | | | | | | | | | | | | |
| Gandy | | | | | | | | | | | | |
| Gio | | | | | | | | | | | | |
| Igor | | | | | | | | | | | | |
| Miguel | | | | | | | | | | | | |
| Mylena | | | | | | | | | | | | |
| Paulo | | | | | | | | | | | | |
| Vini | | | | | | | | | | | | |
| Yá | | | | | | | | | | | | |
| Renata | | | | | | | | | | | | |
| Andressa | | | | | | | | | | | | |
| Guto | | | | | | | | | | | | |
| Tati | | | | | | | | | | | | |
| Luiza | | | | | | | | | | | | |
| Gui | | | | | | | | | | | | |
| Lipe | | | | | | | | | | | | |
| Dani | | | | | | | | | | | | |
| Martina | | | | | | | | | | | | |
| Arthur | | | | | | | | | | | | |
| Fernando | | | | | | | | | | | | |
| Mel | | | | | | | | | | | | |
| Léo | | | | | | | | | | | | |

Key: = "Cast member" is featured in this episode
Key: = "Cast member" arrives on the beach
Key: = "Cast member" has an ex arrive on the beach
Key: = "Cast member" has two exes arrive on the beach
Key: = "Cast member" arrives on the beach and has an ex arrive during the same episode
Key: = "Cast member" leaves the beach
Key: = "Cast member" arrives on the beach and leaves during the same episode
Key: = "Cast member" does not feature in this episode

== Future Appearances ==
After this season, Any Borges, Felipe "Lipe" Ribeiro and Yasmin "Yá" Burihan, appeared in the 5th season, De Férias com o Ex Brasil: Celebs, Any and Lipe in original cast member, and Yá how "ex" from Lipe.

After this season, Igor Freitas appeared in Super Shore.

In 2020, Lipe Ribeiro appeared in A Fazenda 12, he finished in 4th place in the competition.

In 2021, Any Borges appeared in Ilha Record, where she won the competition.

In 2022, Vinicius "Vini" Büttel appeared in A Fazenda 14, he finished in 14th place in the competition.

In 2023, Igor Freitas appeared in A Fazenda 15, he entered in the Warehouse where the public voted for four contestants to move into the main house, he didn't receive enough votes to enter in the game.

In 2024, Martina Sanzi participated in De Férias com o Ex Diretoria, and in 2025 in De Férias com o Ex Caribe VIP, both as an original member.
