= De Férias com o Ex: Celebs =

- Season 5
- No. of housemates: 24
- Location: Trancoso, Bahia
- No. of episodes: 12

Release
- Original network: MTV; Paramount+
- Original release: October 3 – December 20, 2019

Season chronology
- ← Previous; Season 4 Next → Season 6

The fifth season of the Brazilian version of the reality television show De Férias com o Ex, premieres on MTV on Thursday, October 3, 2019.

== Cast ==
- **Bold** indicates original cast member; all other cast were brought into the series as an ex.

Episodes	Name	Age/Hometown	Notability	Exes
12	**Any Borges**	24, Brasília, DF	Digital influencer	João Gabriel Brey
12	**Cinthia Cruz**	19, São Paulo, SP	Actress	Gabriel Romano
12	**Fabio Beltrão**	31, Bragança Paulista, SP	Actor	—N/a
12	**Luiz Felipe Ribeiro (Lipe)**	27, Rio de Janeiro, RJ	Digital influencer	Marcelle Casagrande, Yasmin Burihan
12	**Flavio Nakagima**	31, São Paulo, SP	Surfer	Gabrielle Fernandes
6	**Gui Araújo**	32, São Paulo, SP	Digital influencer	Catherine Bascoy, Vitória Bellato
12	**Hana Khalil**	23, Rio de Janeiro, RJ	Youtuber	Bruno Toledo, Jonas Bento
3	**Leo Picon**	23, Cotia, SP	Digital influencer	—N/a
12	**Rebecca Alves (MC Rebecca)**	20, Rio de Janeiro, RJ	Singer	—N/a
12	**Rafaela Porto**	19, Fortaleza, CE	Singer	—N/a
12	**Stefani Bays**	23, São Leopoldo, RS	Digital influencer	—N/a
12	**Túlio Rocha**	22, Três Lagoas, MS	Youtuber	Mirela Janis, Catherine Bascoy
12	Mirela Janis	22, Goiânia, GO	Digital influencer	Túlio Rocha
11	Gabriel Romano	23, São Paulo, SP	Singer	Cinthia Cruz
10	Marcelle Casagrande	26, Rio de Janeiro, RJ	Investor	Lipe Ribeiro, Bruno Toledo
9	Catherine Bascoy	18, São Paulo, SP	Digital influencer	Gui Araújo, Túlio Rocha
8	João Gabriel Brey	24, Brasília, DF	Businessmen	Any Borges
7	Vitória Bellato	19, São Paulo, SP	Digital influencer	Gui Araújo, Rafael Devecz
7	Gabrielle Fernandes	23, Santos, SP	Actress	Flavio Nakagima, Rodrigo Senna
6	Bruno Toledo	30, Rio de Janeiro, RJ	Model	Hana Khalil, Marcelle Casagrande
5	Rodrigo Senna (**Digow**)	33, Santos, SP	Model	Gabrielle Fernandes
4	Yasmin Burihan (**Yá**)	29, São Paulo, SP	Digital influencer	Lipe Ribeiro
3	Jonas Bento	33, São Paulo, SP	Singer	Hana Khalil
2	Rafael Devecz	19, São Paulo, SP	Model	Vitória Bellato

=== Duration of cast ===
Cast members	Episodes											
Cast members	1	2	3	4	5	6	7	8	9	10	11	12
Any												
Cinthia												
Fabio												
Gui												
Hana												
Leo												
Lipe												
Nakagima												
Rafaela												
Rebecca												
Stefani												
Túlio												
Mirela												
Biel												
Marcelle												
Catherine												
João												
Vitória												
Gabi												
Bruno												
Digow												
Yá												
Jonas												
Rafael												

Key: = "Cast member" is featured in this episode
Key: = "Cast member" arrives on the beach
Key: = "Cast member" has an ex arrive on the beach
Key: = "Cast member" has two exes arrive on the beach
Key: = "Cast member" arrives on the beach and has an ex arrive during the same episode
Key: = "Cast member" leaves the beach
Key: = "Cast member" has an ex arrive on the beach and leaves during the same episode
Key: = "Cast member" arrives on the beach and leaves during the same episode
Key: = "Cast member" does not feature in this episode

== Future Appearances ==
After this season, in 2020, Lipe Ribeiro and Stéfani Bays appeared in A Fazenda 12. Lipe finished in 4th place, while Stéfani finished in 3rd place.

In 2021, Mirela Janis appeared with his boyfriend Yugnir Ângelo in Power Couple Brasil 5, they finished in 8th place in the competition.

In 2021, Any Borges appeared in Ilha Record 1, where she won the competition.

In 2021, Gui Araújo appeared in A Fazenda 13, he finished in 11th place in the competition.

In 2022, Flavio Nakagima and Vitória Bellato appeared in Ilha Record 2. Vitória finished in 13th place, while Nakagima won the competition.

In 2024, Jonas Bento appeared on A Grande Conquista 2, he had to compete for a place to enter in the game and he didn't enter.

In 2026, Rebecca Alves returned for the second season of De Férias com o Ex Diretoria.
