= De Férias com o Ex =

- Also known as: Ex on the Beach Brasil
- Genre: Reality
- Created by: MTV International
- Based on: Ex on the Beach
- Narrated by: Allan Arnold
- Country of origin: Brazil
- Original language: Portuguese
- No. of seasons: 7
- No. of episodes: 80

Production
- Running time: 60 minutes
- Production companies: Floresta; Whizz Kid Entertainment; VIS

Original release
- Network: MTV Brasil; Amazon Prime Video
- Release: October 13, 2016

Related
- Are You the One? De Férias com o Ex Caribe; De Férias com o Ex Diretoria; Rio Shore; Acapulco Shore

De Férias com o Ex Brasil (English: Vacation with the Ex), known as Ex on the Beach Brasil in Latin America and Portugal, is a Brazilian reality television series based on the British television series Ex on the Beach. The series premiered on Thursday, October 13, 2016 at 10:00 p.m. on MTV.

It features ten single men and women enjoying a summer holiday in paradise whilst looking for love. However, they were joined by their exes to shake things up. Each ex was there either for painful revenge or to rekindle their love. The show is narrated by Allan Arnold.

== Production ==
On two occasions the series was renamed "De Férias com o Ex: Celebs" since it had former participants from other programs as well as from previous seasons.

In January 2022, another version of the program began airing in agreement with Paramount+ and MTV Latin America, titled De Férias com o Ex Caribe.

A new adaptation titled "De Férias com o Ex Diretoria" premiered on June 6, 2024.

== Season overview ==
Season	Location	Episodes	Originally released	
Season	Location	Episodes	First released	Last released
1	Pipa Beach	10	October 13, 2016	December 15, 2016
2	Pipa Beach	10	October 19, 2017	December 21, 2017
3	Ilhéus	12	September 27, 2018	December 13, 2018
4	Ilhabela	12	April 25, 2019	July 11, 2019
5	Trancoso	12	October 3, 2019	December 19, 2019
6	Jericoacoara	12	May 21, 2020	August 6, 2020
7	Ilhabela	12	April 8, 2021	June 24, 2021
