= De Férias com o Ex Caribe =

- Also known as: La Venganza de los Ex Caribe
- Genre: Reality
- Created by: VIS
- Based on: Ex on the Beach
- Narrated by: Allan Arnold
- Country of origin: Brazil
- Original language: Portuguese
- No. of series: 4
- No. of episodes: 50

Production
- Production companies: Floresta Produções; TIS Productions

Original release
- Network: Paramount+
- Release: January 13, 2022 – present
- Network: MTV Brazil
- Release: January 13, 2022 – August 7, 2025
- Network: MTV LA
- Release: January 13 – March 31, 2022

Related
- De Férias com o Ex; De Férias com o Ex Diretoria; La Venganza de los Ex VIP

De Férias com o Ex Caribe (English: Ex on the Beach Caribbean) is a Brazilian reality television series created by ViacomCBS International Studios (VIS) and produced and aired by MTV and Paramount+, based on the British television series Ex on the Beach.

The series was first announced on September 21, 2021 as the successor to De Férias com o Ex and premiered on January 13, 2022, simultaneously throughout South America. The first season was the first (and only so far) bilingual season in the Ex on the Beach franchise.

A new adaptation titled De Férias com o Ex Diretoria premiered on June 6, 2024.

== Season overview ==
Season	Location	Episodes	Originally released	
Season	Location	Episodes	First released	Last released
1	Isla Barú, Colombia	12	January 13, 2022	March 31, 2022
2	Isla Barú, Colombia	12	November 15, 2022	December 22, 2022
3	Isla Barú, Colombia	13	October 19, 2023	January 11, 2024
4	Isla Barú, Colombia	13	May 22, 2025	August 7, 2025

== Other appearances ==
In addition to appearing on De Férias com o Ex Caribe, some of the cast members went on to compete in other reality TV shows.

- Power Couple

Cast Member	Season	Result	Finish
João Hadad; Season 1	6	Eliminated 9th	4th
Diego Supérbi; Season 3	7	Eliminated 1st	14th
Giovanna Menezes; Season 3	7	Eliminated 1st	14th

- A Grande Conquista

Cast Member	Season	Result	Finish
Gabriela Rossi; Season 3	2	Not selected	26th
Bifão; Season 2	2	Not selected	24th
João Hadad; Season 1	2	Runner-up	2nd

- A Fazenda (The Farm)

Cast Member	Season	Result	Finish
Lumena Aleluia; Season 2	15	Not selected	23rd–28th
WL Guimarães; Season 2	15	Fourth place	4th
Gabriela Rossi; Season 3	16	Not selected	25th–28th
