= De Férias com o Ex: Celebs 2 =

- Season 7
- Location: Ilhabela, São Paulo
- No. of episodes: 12

Release
- Original network: MTV; Paramount+
- Original release: April 8 – June 24, 2021

Season chronology
- ← Previous; Season 6

De Férias com o Ex: Celebs 2 is the seventh season of the Brazilian reality television series De Férias com o Ex. It features celebrities and past cast members of the show living together in a luxurious mansion with their ex-partners. The season has been filmed in Ilhabela, São Paulo from January 18 to February 10, 2021. The series is set to premiere on April 8, 2021.

For the first time in history, in 2021 the show had a transgender cast member, Tarso Brant.

== Cast ==
The official list of cast members were released on February 26, 2021. They included six boys: Caíque Gama, Matheus Pasquarelli, Neguin, Pedro Ortega, Rico Melquiades and Tarso Brant, and six girls: Day Camargo, Gabily, Ingrid Ohara, Lary Bottino, Maju Mazalli and Marina Gregory.

- **Bold** indicates original cast member; all other cast were brought into the series as an ex.

Episodes	Name	Age/Hometown (Note: Age when first appearing on the show.)	Notability	Exes
12	**Caíque Gama**	25, São Paulo, SP	Musician	Flavia Gabê
12	**Day Camargo**	27, Goiânia, GO	Singer	—N/a
10	**Gabily**	25, São João de Meriti, RJ	Singer	Lincoln Lau
12	**Ingrid Ohara**	24, Belém, PA	Youtuber	Fael
12	**Lary Bottino**	23, Rio de Janeiro, RJ	Digital influencer	Flávio Nakagima
12	**Maju Mazalli**	25, Marília, SP	Digital influencer	Bruninho
12	**Marina Gregory**	26, Rio de Janeiro, RJ	Digital influencer	Sander Henrique
12	**Matheus Pasquarelli**	23, São Paulo, SP	Digital influencer	—N/a
12	**Neguin**	33, Cascavel, PR	Dancer	Bella Fernandes
12	**Pedro Ortega**	29, Rio de Janeiro, RJ	Businessmen	Camila Ribeiro
12	**Rico Melquiades**	29, Maceió, AL	Digital influencer	Luís Mattos
12	**Tarso Brant**	27, Belo Horizonte, MG	Actor	Tainá Felipe
12	Flávio Nakagima	32, São Paulo, SP	Surfer	Lary Bottino
11	Tainá Felipe	24, Belo Horizonte, MG	DJ	Tarso Brant, Diego Gelio
10	Luís Mattos	26, Salvador, BA	Digital influencer	Rico Melquiades
9	Flavia Gabê	24, Curitiba, PR	Singer	Caíque Gama
8	Bruninho	32, Campo Grande, MS	Singer	Maju Mazalli, Gabi Rippi
8	Lincoln Lau	30, São Paulo, SP	Gamer	Gabily, Letícia Escarião
8	Gabi Rippi	31, São Paulo, SP	Digital influencer	Bruninho
7	Fael	25, Lisbon, Portugal	Digital influencer	Ingrid Ohara
6	Camila Ribeiro	26, Porto Alegre, RS	—N/a	Pedro Ortega
5	Diego Gelio	24, São Paulo, SP	Digital influencer	Tainá Felipe
4	Bella Fernandes	25, Itajaí, SC	Dancer	Neguin
3	Sander Henrique	22, Brasília, DF	—N/a	Marina Gregory
2	Letícia Escarião	26, Brasília, DF	Digital influencer	Lincoln
2	Ariana Rosa	26, Brooklyn, United States	Digital influencer	Sander Henrique

=== Cast duration ===
Cast members	Episodes											
Cast members	1	2	3	4	5	6	7	8	9	10	11	12
Caíque												
Day												
Gabily												
Ingrid												
Lary												
Maju												
Marina												
Matheus												
Neguin												
Ortega												
Rico												
Tarso												
Nakagima												
Tainá												
Luís												
Flavia												
Bruninho												
Lincoln												
Gabi												
Fael												
Camila												
Diego												
Bella												
Sander												
Letícia												
Ariana												

Key: = "Cast member" is featured in this episode
Key: = "Cast member" arrives on the beach
Key: = "Cast member" has an ex arrive on the beach
Key: = "Cast member" has two exes arrive on the beach
Key: = "Cast member" arrives on the beach and has an ex arrive during the same episode
Key: = "Cast member" leaves the beach
Key: = "Cast member" has an ex arrive on the beach and leaves during the same episode
Key: = "Cast member" arrives on the beach and leaves during the same episode
Key: = "Cast member" does not feature in this episode

== Future Appearances ==
After this season, in 2021, Rico Melquiades and Lary Bottino appeared in A Fazenda 13. Lary finished in 16th place, while Rico won the competition.

In 2022, Flávio Nakagima appeared in Ilha Record 2, where he won the competition.

In 2022, Ingrid Ohara appeared in A Fazenda 14, she finished in 20th place in the competition.

In 2023, Lary Bottino appeared on A Grande Conquista 1, was one of the favorites but did not secure a place

In 2022, Marina Gregory appeared on De Férias com o Ex Caribe
