= Isla Barú =

Former peninsula south of Cartagena, Colombia

Coordinates: 10°12′50″N 75°36′41″W

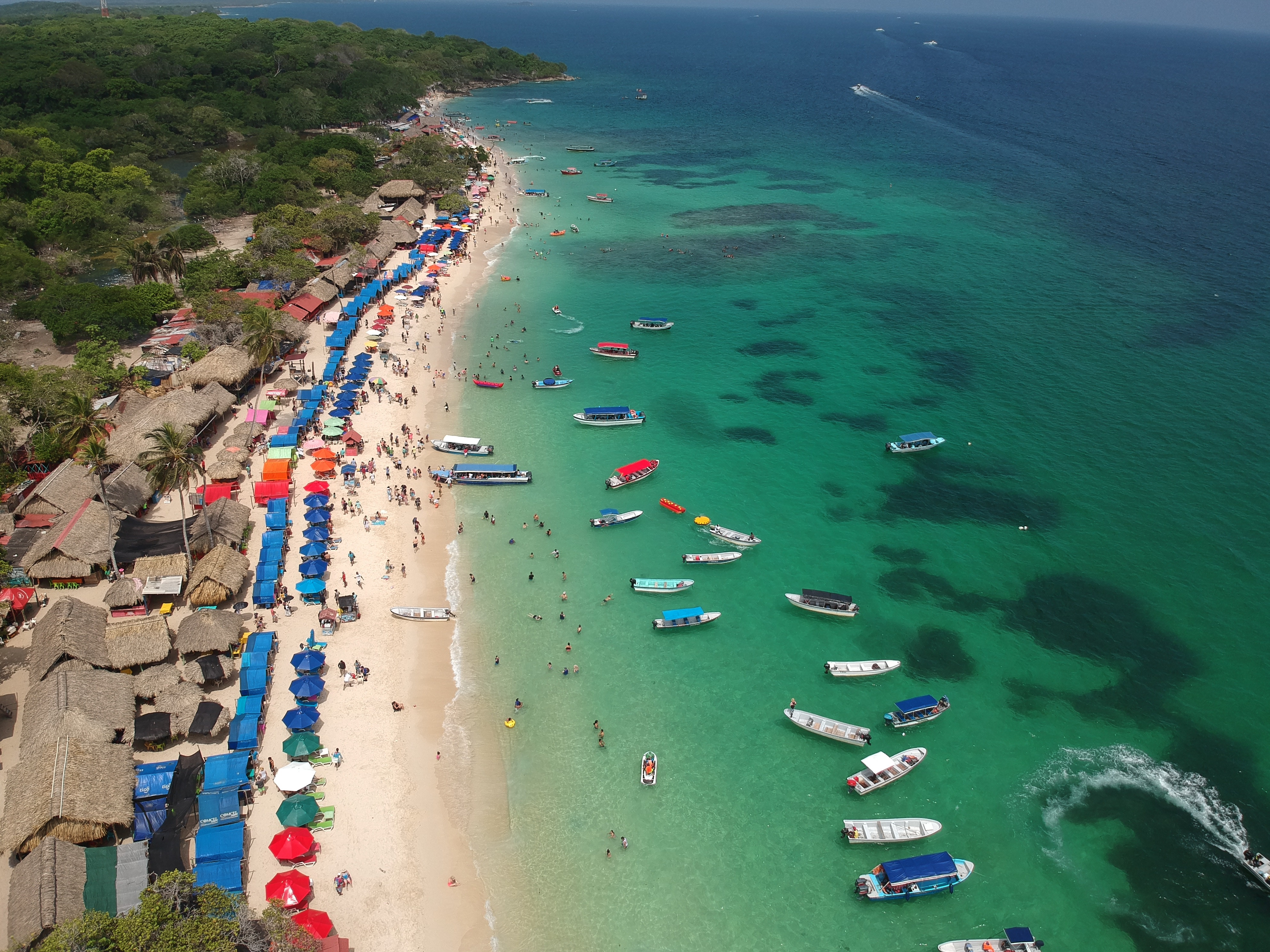
Playa Blaca on Isla Barú

The Isla Barú or Isla de Barú is a former peninsula south of Cartagena, Colombia. It was cut off from the mainland by the Canal del Dique, but is still connected by bridge. It projects out southwest from the southern end of Cartagena towards the Islas del Rosario. It is approximately 25 km long and in places is less than 1 km wide. Approximately 20,000 people live on the island.

Most of the economy of the island is devoted to tourism and summer homes, particularly for visitors to its white sand beach. In 1708 Wager's Action took place off its shores, leading to the sinking of the treasure galleon San José. There are a few options to get from Cartagena to Isla Baru. You can take a ferry, bus, taxi or private transportation. Transportation by boat is typically the fastest and most popular option.
