= De Férias com o Ex Caribe season 2 =

De Férias com o Ex Caribe: Salseiro VIP
- Season 2
- No. of days: 24
- No. of housemates: 22
- Location: Isla Barú, Colombia
- No. of episodes: 12

Release
- Original network: MTV Brazil; Paramount+
- Original release: November 15 – December 22, 2022

Season chronology
- ← Previous; Season 1 Next → Season 3

The second season of the De Férias com o Ex Caribe, also known as De Férias com o Ex Caribe: Salseiro VIP, premiered on MTV on November 15, 2022. It features ten celebrity singles living together on Isla Barú, Colombia with their ex-partners.

== Cast ==
The list of celebrity cast members was released on August 25, 2022. They include five women; Bifão (De Férias com o Ex 4), Lumena Aleluia (Big Brother Brasil 21), digital influencer Maria Venture, Marina Gregory (The Circle, De Férias com o Ex Celebs 2 and All Star Shore) and singer Mirella, and five men; YouTuber Bruno Magri, Lipe Ribeiro (De Férias com o Ex 3 and De Férias com o Ex Celebs) and digital influencers Gabriel Rocha, Lucas Albert and WL Guimarães.

Notable exes include Will Guimarães (Rio Shore), singer The Boy (from trap group Recayd Mob), singer Adriel de Menezes (from rap group Pollo) and Matheus Lisboa (Big Brother Brasil 16 and A Fazenda: Nova Chance).

- **Bold** indicates original cast member; all other cast were brought into the series as an ex.

Episodes	Cast member	Age	Notability	Exes
12	**Jhenyfer "Bifão" Dulz**	32	De Férias com o Ex 4	Will Guimarães
12	**Bruno Magri**	24	YouTuber	—N/a
12	**Gabriel Rocha**	24	Digital influencer	Matheus Lisboa
12	**Luiz Felipe "Lipe" Ribeiro**	30	De Férias com o Ex 3	Dessa Castorino, Vitória Guedes
12	**Lucas Albert**	29	Digital influencer	Luana Targino
12	**Lumena Aleluia**	31	Big Brother Brasil 21	—N/a
12	**Maria Venture**	22	Digital influencer	—N/a
12	**Marina Gregory**	27	The Circle: Brazil	Mellanie Poca
12	**Mirella**	24	Singer	The Boy
12	**Willian "WL" Guimarães**	23	Digital influencer	Julia Peixoto
12	Andressa "Dessa" Castorino	27	Digital influencer	Lipe Ribeiro, Sérgio Mota, Adriel de Menezes
11	William "Will" Guimarães	31	Rio Shore 2	Bifão
10	Luana Targinno	25	Digital influencer	Lucas Albert
10	Sérgio Mota	26	Digital influencer	Dessa Castorino
9	Davi "The Boy" Alpiste	26	Singer	Mirella
8	Adriel de Menezes	31	Singer	Dessa Castorino
7	Julia Peixoto	23	Digital influencer	WL, MOB
6	Matheus Lisboa	32	Big Brother Brasil 16	Gabriel Rocha
5	Marcos "MOB" Dias	21	Digital influencer	Julia Peixoto
4	Vitória Guedes	25	Digital influencer	Adriel de Menezes, Lipe Ribeiro
3	Mellanie Poca	26	Digital influencer	Marina Gregory
3	Renan Brasil	23	Digital influencer	Gabriel Rocha

== Future Appearances ==
In 2023, Lumena Aleluia appeared in A Fazenda 15, she entered in the Warehouse where the public voted for four contestants to move into the main house, she didn't receive enough votes to enter in the game. In 2024 appeared for the first season of De Férias com o Ex Diretoria. In 2026 returned for a second season of De Férias com o Ex Diretoria.

In 2023, Willian "WL" Guimarães also appeared in A Fazenda 15, he finished in fourth place in the competition.

In 2024, Jhenyfer "Bifão" Dulz appeared on A Grande Conquista 2, she had to compete for a place to enter in the game and she didn't enter.

In 2024, Luana Targinno appeared in A Fazenda 16, she finished in 10th place in the competition.

In 2026, Willian Guimarães returned for the second season of De Férias com o Ex Diretoria.

== Duration of cast ==
Cast members	Episodes											
Cast members	1	2	3	4	5	6	7	8	9	10	11	12
Bifão												
Bruno												
Gabriel												
Lipe												
Lucas												
Lumena												
Maria												
Marina												
Mirella												
WL												
Dessa												
Will												
Luana												
Sérgio												
The Boy												
Adriel												
Julia												
Matheus												
MOB												
Vitória												
Mellanie												
Renan												

Key
Cast member is featured in this episode
Cast member arrives on the beach
Cast member has an ex arrive on the beach
Cast member arrives on the beach and has an ex arrive during the same episode
Cast member leaves the beach
Cast member does not feature in this episode

== Episodes ==
No. overall	No. in season	Title	Original release date
Week 1
13	1	"Episode 1"	November 15, 2022
14	2	"Episode 2"	November 17, 2022
Week 2
15	3	"Episode 3"	November 22, 2022
16	4	"Episode 4"	November 24, 2022
Week 3
17	5	"Episode 5"	November 29, 2022
18	6	"Episode 6"	December 1, 2022
Week 4
19	7	"Episode 7"	December 6, 2022
20	8	"Episode 8"	December 8, 2022
Week 5
21	9	"Episode 9"	December 13, 2022
22	10	"Episode 10"	December 15, 2022
Week 6
23	11	"Episode 11"	December 20, 2022
24	12	"Episode 12"	December 22, 2022
