= A Fazenda 9 =

Season of television series

- Season 9
- Hosted by: Roberto Justus
- No. of days: 87
- No. of contestants: 16
- Winner: Flávia Viana
- Runner-up: Marcos Harter
- Companion show: A Fazenda Online
- No. of episodes: 85

Release
- Original network: RecordTV
- Original release: September 12 – December 7, 2017

Season chronology
- ← Previous; A Fazenda 8 Next → A Fazenda 10

A Fazenda 9 (Note: also taglined as A Fazenda: Nova Chance (English: The Farm: New Chance)) was the ninth season of the Brazilian reality television series A Fazenda, which premiered on Tuesday, September 12, 2017, on RecordTV. It was hosted by Roberto Justus. Directed by Rodrigo Carelli, it featured 16 former participants from Brazilian television reality shows, confined in a new headquarters located in Itapecerica da Serra, (Greater São Paulo).

This season features a cast of sixteen farmers, who are all former contestants from A Fazenda, Power Couple Brasil, A Casa and Aprendiz Celebridades (all from RecordTV), Big Brother Brasil (Globo) and MasterChef (Band) for a new chance to win the grand prize.

It marks the debut of a brand new Farm location, who moved from Itu to Itapecerica da Serra. Roberto Justus returned as host. The grand prize for the winner is R$ 1.5 million without tax allowances, with a brand new car offered to the runner-up.

On December 7, 2017, 33-year-old actress Flávia Viana won the competition with 56.37% of the public vote over doctor Marcos Harter (40.26%) and YouTuber Matheus Lisboa (3.37%).

== Contestants ==
Below is biographical information according to the RecordTV official site, plus footnoted additions.
(ages stated are correct at the start of the contest)

Contestant	Age	Background	Hometown	Week 1 team	Week 3 team	Merged team	Status	Finish
Nicole Bahls; A Fazenda 5	31	Comedian & TV host	Londrina	Iron			Eliminated 1st on September 21, 2017	16th
Adriana Bombom; A Fazenda 2	43	TV host & reporter	Rio de Janeiro	Fire			Eliminated 2nd on September 28, 2017	15th
Fabio Arruda; A Fazenda 1	47	Style consultant & TV host	Rio de Janeiro	Iron	Iron		Eliminated 3rd on October 5, 2017	14th
Dinei; A Fazenda 4	47	Former football player	São Paulo	Fire	Fire		Eliminated 4th on October 12, 2017	13th
Nahim; Aprendiz Celebridades	65	TV host & singer	Miguelópolis	Fire	Fire		Eliminated 5th on October 19, 2017	12th
Conrado; Power Couple Brasil	49	Singer	Belo Horizonte	Fire	Fire		Eliminated 6th on October 26, 2017	11th
Aritana Maroni; MasterChef 2	38	Chef	São Paulo	Fire	Fire		Eliminated 7th on November 2, 2017	10th
Ana Paula Minerato; A Fazenda 8	26	Model & reporter	São Paulo	Iron	Iron		Eliminated 8th on November 9, 2017	9th
Marcelo Zangrandi; Power Couple Brasil 2	31	Comedian & businessman	São Paulo	Iron	Iron	Final Eight	Eliminated 9th on November 16, 2017	8th
Monique Amin; Big Brother Brasil 12	29	Model & businesswoman	Florianópolis	Iron	Iron	Final Eight	Eliminated 10th on November 23, 2017	7th
Yuri Fernandes; Big Brother Brasil 12	31	Sports businessman & model	Goiânia	Fire	Fire	Final Eight	Eliminated 11th on November 30, 2017	6th
Rita Cadillac; A Fazenda 6	63	Actress & singer	Rio de Janeiro	Iron	Fire	Final Eight	Eliminated 12th on December 4, 2017	5th
Monick Camargo; A Casa	24	Model	Anápolis	Iron	Iron	Final Eight	Eliminated 13th on December 5, 2017	4th
Matheus Lisboa; Big Brother Brasil 16	27	YouTuber	Barra Longa	Iron	Iron	Final Eight	Third place on December 7, 2017	3rd
Marcos Harter; Big Brother Brasil 17	38	Doctor	Porto Alegre	Fire	Fire	Final Eight	Runner-up on December 7, 2017	2nd
Flávia Viana; Big Brother Brasil 7	33	Actress	São Paulo	Fire	Iron	Final Eight	Winner on December 7, 2017	1st

== Future Appearances ==
In 2018, Aritana Maroni appeared with her husband Paulo Rogerio in Power Couple Brasil 3, they finished as runner-up from the competition.

In 2019, Nicole Bahls appeared with her husband Marcelo Bimbi in Power Couple Brasil 4, they originally finished in 8th place, however they comeback to the game and finished as winners from the competition.

In 2021, Dinei appeared in Ilha Record 1, he originally finished in 13th place, however he comeback to the game and finished in 5th place in the competition, in 2022, Dinei appeared with his wife Erika Dias in Power Couple Brasil 6, they finished in 12th place in the competition.

In 2022, Nahim appeared with his wife Andreia Andrade in Power Couple Brasil 6, they finished in 11th place in the competition.

In 2022, Matheus Lisboa appeared on De Férias com o Ex Caribe: Salseiro VIP as an ex.

== The game ==
=== Key Power ===
Since the fifth season, contestants compete to win the Key Power. The Key Power entitles the holder to open the container which may unleash good or bad consequences on the nomination process. Unlike other seasons, this season the powers are already subdivided in three envelopesː golden, silver and red.

The Key Power winner holds the golden envelope (which will always brings a good consequence) and delegates which contestantes holds the silver and red (defined by the public through of R7.com among three options) envelopes. The Key holder's choice is marked in bold.

Results

Week	Players	Winner	Sent to the Stall	Consequences		
Week	Players	Winner	Sent to the Stall	Key holder	Key holder's choices	
1	Nicole	Yuri	**Nicole**, Monick, Monique	Yuri: Ban two contestants from voting (**Ana Paula** and **Matheus**).	Ana Paula: Won a trip for two to Dubai.	Matheus: Do all the dishes for the next 48 hours.
1	Yuri	Yuri	**Nicole**, Monick, Monique	Yuri: Ban two contestants from voting (**Ana Paula** and **Matheus**).	Ana Paula: Won a trip for two to Dubai.	Matheus: Do all the dishes for the next 48 hours.
2	Matheus	Marcos	**Matheus**, Conrado, Marcelo	Marcos: Win immunity or **give immunity** (**Conrado**).	Nahim: Double vote.	Aritana: Vote in a contestant of her own team (**Flávia**).
2	Marcos	Marcos	**Matheus**, Conrado, Marcelo	Marcos: Win immunity or **give immunity** (**Conrado**).	Nahim: Double vote.	Aritana: Vote in a contestant of her own team (**Flávia**).
3	Marcelo	Yuri	**Marcelo**, Conrado, Dinei, ~~Rita~~	Yuri: Switch a contestant from the Stall (**Rita** for **Conrado**).	Marcos: Banned from voting.	Nahim: Win immunity or **win R$10.000**.
3	Yuri	Yuri	**Marcelo**, Conrado, Dinei, ~~Rita~~	Yuri: Switch a contestant from the Stall (**Rita** for **Conrado**).	Marcos: Banned from voting.	Nahim: Win immunity or **win R$10.000**.
4	Ana Paula	Flávia	**Ana Paula**, Aritana, Marcos	Flávia: Decide if the 3rd nominee would be chosen among the House or the **Stall**.	Yuri: Switch two contestants from their teams (**Rita** for **Flávia**).	Conrado: Double vote but every vote received would also count as double.
4	Flávia	Flávia	**Ana Paula**, Aritana, Marcos	Flávia: Decide if the 3rd nominee would be chosen among the House or the **Stall**.	Yuri: Switch two contestants from their teams (**Rita** for **Flávia**).	Conrado: Double vote but every vote received would also count as double.
5	Marcelo	Marcelo	**Conrado**, Nahim, Marcos	Marcelo: Veto four votes (**Aritana**, **Nahim**, **Monick** and **Marcos**).	Matheus: Revote as the first vote given was cancelled.	Flávia: Choose one contestant from each team to have double vote (**Matheus** and **Rita**).
5	Conrado	Marcelo	**Conrado**, Nahim, Marcos	Marcelo: Veto four votes (**Aritana**, **Nahim**, **Monick** and **Marcos**).	Matheus: Revote as the first vote given was cancelled.	Flávia: Choose one contestant from each team to have double vote (**Matheus** and **Rita**).
6	Monique	Monique	**Aritana**, Flávia, Marcelo	Monique: Won a brand new car.	Monick: **Win immunity but do not vote** or vote without immunity.	Ana Paula: Become the second nominee if someone from Iron team (her team) vote for her.
6	Aritana	Monique	**Aritana**, Flávia, Marcelo	Monique: Won a brand new car.	Monick: **Win immunity but do not vote** or vote without immunity.	Ana Paula: Become the second nominee if someone from Iron team (her team) vote for her.
7	Monick	Monick	**Marcos**, Aritana, Rita	Monick: Won a trip to South Africa.	Ana Paula: Change the 3rd nominee (**Marcos**) for some contestant of the main house (**Yuri**).	Matheus: The farmer wins R$20.000 if nominate the red envelope's owner.
7	Marcos	Monick	**Marcos**, Aritana, Rita	Monick: Won a trip to South Africa.	Ana Paula: Change the 3rd nominee (**Marcos**) for some contestant of the main house (**Yuri**).	Matheus: The farmer wins R$20.000 if nominate the red envelope's owner.
8	Matheus	Matheus	**Rita**, Ana Paula, Marcelo	Matheus: Won R$20.000 and should give an immunity (**Flávia**).	Marcelo: Won a video call from home.	Monique: Saved and should save a contestant from being the 3rd nominee and so on until one contestant left (**Monick**, who saved **Rita**, who saved **Matheus**, leaving Marcelo as the 3rd nominee).
8	Rita	Matheus	**Rita**, Ana Paula, Marcelo	Matheus: Won R$20.000 and should give an immunity (**Flávia**).	Marcelo: Won a video call from home.	Monique: Saved and should save a contestant from being the 3rd nominee and so on until one contestant left (**Monick**, who saved **Rita**, who saved **Matheus**, leaving Marcelo as the 3rd nominee).
9	Iron; Team	Flávia	Team with fewest members: Rita, Yuri	Flávia: Choose someone not nominated to compete in the next Farmer challenge (**Matheus**); the Farmer of this week must choose someone to compete too (**Yuri**).; Extra Prize: A brand new car	Marcelo: The silver envelope's owner is nominated next week.; Extra Prize: R$25.000	Matheus: The red envelope's owner is immune only of the house's votes. Extra Prize: R$10.000
10	Flávia	Rita	**Flávia**, Monick	Rita: Immunity.	Yuri: Change the 3rd nominee (**Flávia**) for some contestant of the main house (**Monique**).	Monique: Nullified vote.
10	Rita	Rita	**Flávia**, Monick	Rita: Immunity.	Yuri: Change the 3rd nominee (**Flávia**) for some contestant of the main house (**Monique**).	Monique: Nullified vote.
11	Monick	Monick	(none)	Monick: Choose between keep her vote or **nullify her vote and win R$10.000**.	Yuri: 3rd nominee. If the envelope's owner is already nominated, he must choose the 3rd nominee (**Matheus**).	Rita: The red envelope's owner is immune of the farmer's nomination.
11	Yuri	Monick	(none)	Monick: Choose between keep her vote or **nullify her vote and win R$10.000**.	Yuri: 3rd nominee. If the envelope's owner is already nominated, he must choose the 3rd nominee (**Matheus**).	Rita: The red envelope's owner is immune of the farmer's nomination.

== Voting history ==
	Week 1	Week 2	Week 3	Week 4	Week 5	Week 6	Week 7	Week 8	Week 9	Week 10	Week 11	Week 12		Week 13	Nominations received
	Week 1	Week 2	Week 3	Week 4	Week 5	Week 6	Week 7	Week 8	Week 9	Week 10	Week 11	Day 81	Day 84	Finale	Nominations received
Farmer of the Week	Flávia	Ana Paula	Matheus	Nahim	Yuri	Marcos	Marcelo	Yuri	Marcos	Matheus	Marcos	Matheus	(none)		
Nominated (Farmer)	Monick	Bombom	Nahim	Yuri	Nahim	Conrado	Aritana	Ana Paula	Flávia	Monick	Yuri	Marcos	(none)		
Nominated (House)	Ana Paula	Flávia	Fabio	Dinei	Rita	Rita	Flávia	Marcos	Marcelo	Marcos	Rita	Monick	(none)		
Nominated (Others)	Nicole	Matheus	Marcelo	Marcos	Marcos	Marcelo	~~Marcos~~; Yuri	Marcelo	(none)	~~Flávia~~; Monique	Matheus	Rita	(none)		
Flávia	Farmer of the Week	Dinei	Fabio	Dinei	Rita	Rita	Yuri	Marcos	Monique	Marcos	Rita	Monick	Nominee	Winner (Day 87)	18
Marcos	Ana Paula	Flávia	Banned	Flávia	~~Matheus~~	Farmer of the Week	Ana Paula	Matheus	Farmer of the Week	Yuri	Rita	Flávia	Nominee	Runner-Up (Day 87)	11
Matheus	Banned	Aritana	Farmer of the Week	Dinei	~~Rita (x2)~~ Aritana (x2)	Rita	Yuri	Marcos	Monick	Farmer of the Week	Rita	Monick	Saved	Third Place (Day 87)	9
Monick	Aritana	Flávia	Fabio	Dinei	~~Aritana~~	Exempt	Flávia	Marcos	Marcelo	Marcos	~~Matheus~~	Flávia	Nominee	Evicted (Day 85)	5
Rita	Ana Paula	Flávia	Fabio	Dinei	Matheus (x2)	Matheus	Matheus	Matheus	Marcelo	Marcos	Matheus	Monick	Evicted (Day 84)		12
Yuri	Ana Paula	Flávia	Fabio	Dinei	Farmer of the Week	Matheus	Flávia	Farmer of the Week	Marcelo	Marcos	Matheus	Evicted (Day 80)			5
Monique	Aritana	Aritana	Fabio	Dinei	Rita	Rita	Flávia	Marcos	Marcelo	~~Yuri~~	Evicted (Day 73)				5
Marcelo	Nahim	Dinei	Fabio	Dinei	Rita	Rita	Farmer of the Week	Marcos	Monique	Evicted (Day 66)					4
Ana Paula	Banned	Farmer of the Week	Fabio	Dinei	Rita	Rita	Flávia	Marcos	Evicted (Day 59)						12
Aritana	Ana Paula	Flávia	Fabio	Dinei	~~Marcelo~~	Monique	Monique	Evicted (Day 52)							8
Conrado	Ana Paula	Flávia	Fabio	Dinei (x2)	Rita	Monique	Evicted (Day 45)								3
Nahim	Ana Paula	Flávia (x2)	Fabio	Farmer of the Week	~~Marcelo~~	Evicted (Day 38)									3
Dinei	Ana Paula	Flávia	Fabio	Conrado (x2)	Evicted (Day 31)										13
Fabio	Ana Paula	Aritana	Marcos	Evicted (Day 24)											11
Bombom	Ana Paula	Flávia	Evicted (Day 17)												1
Nicole	Ana Paula	Evicted (Day 10)													0
Notes															
Up for nomination	Ana Paula; Monick; Nicole	Bombom; Flávia; Matheus	Fabio; Marcelo; Nahim	Dinei; Marcos; Yuri	Marcos; Nahim; Rita	Conrado; Marcelo; Rita	Aritana; Flávia; Yuri	Ana Paula; Marcelo; Marcos	(none)	Marcos; Monick; Monique	Matheus; Rita; Yuri	(none)			
Saved	Ana Paula	Matheus	Nahim	Yuri	Marcos	Marcelo	Yuri	Marcos	(none)	Marcos	Matheus	(none)			
Nominated for eviction	Monick; Nicole	Bombom; Flávia	Fabio; Marcelo	Dinei; Marcos	Nahim; Rita	Conrado; Rita	Aritana; Flávia	Ana Paula; Marcelo	Flávia; Marcelo	Monick; Monique	Rita; Yuri	Marcos; Monick; Rita	Flávia; Marcos; Monick	Flávia; Marcos; Matheus	
Evicted	Nicole; 31.74% to save	Bombom; 29.47% to save	Fabio; 16.97% to save	Dinei; 47.95% to save	Nahim; 48.23% to save	Conrado; 40.17% to save	Aritana; 41.89% to save	Ana Paula; 32.67% to save	Marcelo; 32.17% to save	Monique; 33.46% to save	Yuri; 49.32% to save	Rita; 10.49% to save	Monick; 11.18% to save	Matheus; 3.37% to win	
Evicted	Nicole; 31.74% to save	Bombom; 29.47% to save	Fabio; 16.97% to save	Dinei; 47.95% to save	Nahim; 48.23% to save	Conrado; 40.17% to save	Aritana; 41.89% to save	Ana Paula; 32.67% to save	Marcelo; 32.17% to save	Monique; 33.46% to save	Yuri; 49.32% to save	Rita; 10.49% to save	Monick; 11.18% to save	Marcos; 40.26% to win	
Evicted	Nicole; 31.74% to save	Bombom; 29.47% to save	Fabio; 16.97% to save	Dinei; 47.95% to save	Nahim; 48.23% to save	Conrado; 40.17% to save	Aritana; 41.89% to save	Ana Paula; 32.67% to save	Marcelo; 32.17% to save	Monique; 33.46% to save	Yuri; 49.32% to save	Rita; 10.49% to save	Monick; 11.18% to save	Flávia; 56.37% to win	

== Ratings and reception ==
=== Brazilian ratings ===
All numbers are in points and provided by IBOPE.

First air date	MON	TUE	WED	THU	FRI	SAT	SUN	Weekly average
09/12 to 09/17/2017	—	10.4	9.8	8.3	8.5	8.5	7.8	8.8
09/18 to 09/24/2017	7.8	7.6	10.1	7.7	9.0	7.5	7.2	8.1
09/25 to 10/01/2017	9.2	9.1	10.2	8.0	7.9	7.7	8.3	8.6
10/02 to 10/08/2017	8.2	9.0	8.8	7.3	9.2	7.0	7.3	8.1
10/09 to 10/15/2017	9.1	6.4	9.0	8.1	8.7	6.8	7.9	8.0
10/16 to 10/22/2017	9.3	10.5	9.6	7.6	3.6	6.0	7.5	7.7
10/23 to 10/29/2017	8.9	9.2	9.8	8.3	7.4	5.4	7.1	8.0
10/30 to 11/05/2017	8.5	9.9	10.8	8.8	8.9	7.0	6.8	8.7
11/06 to 11/12/2017	9.5	10.3	9.9	9.1	8.4	8.4	6.7	8.9
11/13 to 11/19/2017	8.7	8.7	7.9	9.1	9.6	7.2	6.5	8.2
11/20 to 11/26/2017	8.5	9.6	10.2	10.3	8.4	6.8	7.1	8.7
11/27 to 12/03/2017	9.6	10.9	10.4	11.0	10.4	7.6	7.8	9.7
12/04 to 12/07/2017	9.9	10.9	11.0	11.7	—	—	—	10.9
09/12 to 12/07/2017	Season average							8.6

- In 2017, each point represents 70,500 households in São Paulo.
