= BB16 =

BB16 may refer to:

- Big Brother 16 (disambiguation), a television program in various versions
- USS New Jersey (BB-16), a United States Navy battleship
