= Big Brother Brasil 16 =

- Season 16
- Presented by: Pedro Bial
- No. of days: 78
- No. of housemates: 16
- Winner: Munik Nunes
- Runner-up: Maria Claudia Macedo
- No. of episodes: 78

Release
- Original network: Globo
- Original release: January 19 – April 5, 2016

Season chronology
- ← Previous; Big Brother Brasil 15 Next → Big Brother Brasil 17

Big Brother Brasil 16 was the sixteenth season of Big Brother Brasil which premiered January 19, 2016, with the season finale airing April 5, 2016, on the Rede Globo. The show was produced by Endemol Globo and it was the last presented by journalist Pedro Bial, replaced by Tiago Leifert in 2017, after leaving the sports department, 1 year before the premiere of the talk show Conversa com Bial.

The grand prize is R$1.5 million with tax allowances, with a R$150,000 prize offered to the runner-up and a R$50,000 prize offered to the 3rd place. 19 Year Old Student Munik Nunes won this season on Day 78.

== The game ==
=== Changes in the voting system ===
For the first time in the program since its debut, there was a change in the voting system of the show. From the fifth week of the season, the public's vote became regional based. The candidate who achieves a simple majority of votes in each region of Brazil (Midwest, Northeast, North, Southeast and South) by internet gets a point. Also earn one point the candidate who obtains a simple majority of all votes by calls and SMS. Thus, there are six points in total: five per geographic region and another by SMS and telephone. In case of a tied score, the contestant with the most votes is evicted. The votes from outside is distributed equally among the five regions of Brazil.

Week	Housemate	Internet					Calls & SMS	Score	Average
Week	Housemate	Midwest	Northeast	North	Southeast	South	Calls & SMS	Score	Average
5	Ana Paula	36%	39%	36%	40%	44%	41%	0	39.33%
5	Juliana	64%	61%	64%	60%	56%	59%	6	60.67%
6	Ana Paula	35.13%	34.53%	33.59%	36.51%	42.66%	35.21%	0	36.27%
6	Munik	5.36%	5.71%	5.30%	5.69%	6.21%	6.80%	0	5.85%
6	Tamiel	59.51%	59.76%	61.11%	57.80%	51.13%	57.99%	6	57.88%
7	Adélia	76.55%	73.23%	75.14%	70.67%	67.69%	63.02%	6	71.05%
7	Munik	3.33%	4.13%	3.43%	3.63%	4.48%	8.02%	0	4.50%
7	Ronan	20.12%	22.64%	21.43%	25.70%	27.83%	28.96%	0	24.45%
8	Geralda	37.28%	42.57%	39.42%	42.38%	44.16%	39.86%	0	40.95%
8	Renan	57.07%	52.24%	55.47%	52.74%	49.86%	51.42%	6	53.13%
8	Ronan	5.65%	5.19%	5.11%	4.88%	5.98%	8.72%	0	5.92%
9	Geralda	28.34%	34.49%	28.42%	32.74%	37.3%	38.64%	0	33.32%
9	Matheus	71.66%	65.51%	71.58%	67.26%	62.7%	61.36%	6	66.68%
11 (Day 73)	Geralda	48.19%	52.46%	50.48%	53.06%	60.66%	61.86%	5	54.45%
11 (Day 73)	Ronan	51.81%	47.54%	49.52%	46.94%	39.34%	38.14%	1	45.55%
11 (Day 75)	Munik	17.31%	20.72%	22.65%	24.89%	29.94%	40.53%	0	26.01%
11 (Day 75)	Ronan	82.69%	79.28%	77.35%	75.11%	70.06%	59.47%	6	73.99%
11 (Finale)	Maria Claudia	25.97%	49.42%	34.91%	35.41%	39.59%	46.17%	0	38.41%
11 (Finale)	Munik	74.03%	51.58%	65.09%	64.59%	60.41%	53.83%	6	61.59%

=== Power of No ===
Week	Power of No	Total vetoed	Vetoed housemates
2	Ronan	7	Geralda, Juliana, Matheus, Maria Claudia, Renan, Ronan and Tamiel
3	Daniel	4	Ana Paula, Geralda, Munik and Ronan
6	Renan & Tamiel	1	Ana Paula
7	Renan	3	Ana Paula, Munik and Ronan

=== Big Phone ===
Week	Date	Timeslot (BRT)	Housemate	Consequences
2	January 29, 2016	Friday; 10:52PM	Ronan	See; Note 4
6	February 26, 2016	Friday; 10:55PM	Tamiel	See; Note 10

== Housemates ==
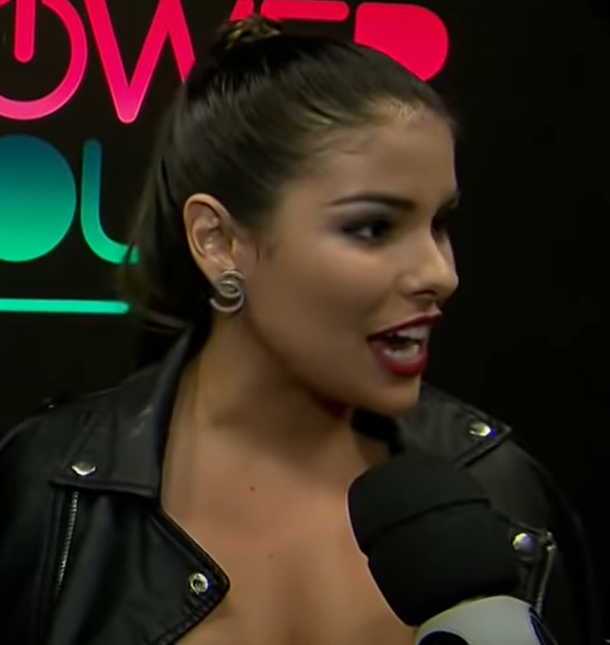
Munik Nunes, the winner of Big Brother Brasil 16.

The cast list with the first 12 housemates was unveiled on January 13, 2016. On day 3, four potential competitors (Fernanda, Geralda, Matheus and William) entered the apartment to compete by public vote for the 13th and 14th housemate's spot.

Name	Age	Hometown	Occupation	Day entered	Day exited	Result
Munik Nunes	19	Goiânia	Student	1	78	Winner
Maria Claudia Macedo	19	Santa Cruz	YouTuber	1	78	Runner-up
Ronan Veiga	27	Curitiba	Philosophy student	1	76	10th Evicted
Geralda Diniz	63	Curvelo	Retired teacher	3	74	9th Evicted
Matheus Lisboa	25	Barra Longa	Electrical engineer	3	64	8th Evicted
Renan Oliveira	29	Amparo	Model	1	57	7th Evicted
Adélia Soares	36	Suzano	Lawyer	1	50	6th Evicted
Ana Paula Renault	34	Belo Horizonte	Journalist	1	47	Ejected
Tamiel Baiocchi	41	Goiânia	Ecology teacher	1	43	5th Evicted
Juliana Dias	31	São Paulo	Dancer	1	36	4th Evicted
Daniel Manzieri	38	Rio de Janeiro	Manager	1	29	3rd Evicted
Alan Marinho	34	Natal	Doctor of Philosophy	1	18	Walked
Laércio de Moura	53	Curitiba	Tattoo designer	1	15	2nd Evicted
Harumi Ishihara	64	São Paulo	Journalist	1	8	1st Evicted

== Future appearances ==
In 2017, Matheus Lisboa appeared in A Fazenda 9, he finished in 3rd place.

In 2018, Munik Nunes appeared with her husband Anderson Felício in Power Couple Brasil 3, they finished in 3rd place.

In 2018, Ana Paula Renault appeared in A Fazenda 10, she finished in 14th place.

In 2022, Matheus Lisboa appeared on De Férias com o Ex Caribe: Salseiro VIP as an ex.

In 2026, Ana Paula Renault returned and was crowned winner in Big Brother Brasil 26.

== Voting history ==
Key
– Generation Play
– Generation Love
– Generation Turn
– Generation Ensures

	Week 1		Week 2	Week 3	Week 4	Week 5	Week 6	Week 7	Week 8	Week 9	Week 11		
	Day 3	Day 6	Week 2	Week 3	Week 4	Week 5	Week 6	Week 7	Week 8	Week 9	Day 73	Day 75	Finale
Head(s) of Household	(none)	Alan; Daniel; Ronan; Tamiel	Daniel	Juliana	Munik	Renan; Tamiel	Renan; Tamiel	Renan	Munik	Maria Claudia	Maria Claudia	(none)	
Power of Immunity	(none)	Adélia	Tamiel	Matheus	Juliana	Ana Paula	Maria Claudia	Matheus	Matheus	Matheus	(none)	(none)	
Saved	(none)	Juliana	Adélia	Maria Claudia	Renan	Ronan	Adélia	Geralda	Maria Claudia	Maria Claudia	(none)	(none)	
Nomination (Twists)	(none)	(none)					Ana Paula	Adélia	Geralda	(none)	(none)	(none)	
Nomination (HoH)	(none)	Harumi	Ana Paula	Ana Paula	Daniel	Ana Paula	Munik	Ronan	Renan	Geralda	Geralda	Munik; Ronan	(none)
Nomination (Housemates)	(none)	Daniel	Laércio	Ronan	Ronan	Juliana	Tamiel	Munik	Ronan	Matheus	Ronan	Munik; Ronan	(none)
Munik	Not eligible	Alan	Daniel	Daniel	Head of Household	Juliana	Tamiel	Renan	Head of Household	Matheus	Not eligible	Nominated	Winner (Day 78)
Maria Claudia	Not eligible	Daniel	Laércio	Ronan	Ronan	Geralda	Geralda	Munik	Ronan	Head of Household	Head of Household	Exempt	Runner-up (Day 78)
Ronan	Not eligible	Co-head of Household	Laércio	Juliana	Tamiel	Juliana	Tamiel	Renan	Matheus	Matheus	Not eligible	Nominated	Evicted (Day 76)
Geralda	Nominated	Laércio	Daniel	Daniel	Tamiel	Juliana	Maria Claudia	Renan	Matheus	Matheus	Ronan	Evicted (Day 74)	
Matheus	Nominated	Daniel	Laércio	Ronan	Tamiel	Juliana	Ronan	Munik	Ronan	Ronan	Evicted (Day 64)		
Renan	Not eligible	Ana Paula	Laércio	Ronan	Ronan	Co-head of Household	Co-head of Household	Munik	Ronan	Evicted (Day 57)			
Adélia	Not eligible	Alan	Laércio	Ronan	Ronan	Munik	Ronan	Munik	Evicted (Day 50)				
Ana Paula	Not eligible	Daniel	Laércio	Juliana	Tamiel	Juliana	Tamiel	Ejected (Day 47)					
Tamiel	Not eligible	Co-head of Household	Geralda	Matheus	Ronan	Co-head of Household	Co-head of Household	Evicted (Day 43)					
Juliana	Not eligible	Alan	Laércio	Head of Household	Ronan	Munik	Evicted (Day 36)						
Daniel	Not eligible	Co-head of Household	Head of Household	Ronan	Ronan	Evicted (Day 29)							
Alan	Not eligible	Co-head of Household	Munik	Walked (Day 18)									
Laércio	Not eligible	Adélia	Matheus	Evicted (Day 15)									
Harumi	Not eligible	Daniel	Evicted (Day 8)										
Fernanda	Nominated	Evicted (Day 6)											
William	Nominated	Evicted (Day 6)											
Notes	1, 2		3	4		5, 6	7, 8	9, 10, 11	12	(none)	13, 14	15	16
Nominated for Eviction	Fernanda; Geralda	Daniel; Harumi	Ana Paula; Laércio	Ana Paula; Ronan	Daniel; Ronan	Ana Paula; Juliana	Ana Paula; Munik; Tamiel	Adélia; Munik; Ronan	Geralda; Renan; Ronan	Geralda; Matheus	Geralda; Ronan	Munik; Ronan	Maria Claudia; Munik
Nominated for Eviction	Matheus; William	Daniel; Harumi	Ana Paula; Laércio	Ana Paula; Ronan	Daniel; Ronan	Ana Paula; Juliana	Ana Paula; Munik; Tamiel	Adélia; Munik; Ronan	Geralda; Renan; Ronan	Geralda; Matheus	Geralda; Ronan	Munik; Ronan	Maria Claudia; Munik
Walked	(none)			Alan	(none)								
Ejected	(none)							Ana Paula	(none)				
Evicted	Fernanda; 47% to save	Harumi; 65% to evict	Laércio; 54% to evict	Ana Paula; 74% to move	Daniel; 53% to evict	Juliana; 6 of 6 points to evict	Tamiel; 6 of 6 points to evict	Adélia; 6 of 6 points to evict	Renan; 6 of 6 points to evict	Matheus; 6 of 6 points to evict	Geralda; 5 of 6 points to evict	Ronan; 6 of 6 points to evict	Maria Claudia; 0 of 6 points to win
Evicted	William; 39% to save	Harumi; 65% to evict	Laércio; 54% to evict	Ana Paula; 74% to move	Daniel; 53% to evict	Juliana; 6 of 6 points to evict	Tamiel; 6 of 6 points to evict	Adélia; 6 of 6 points to evict	Renan; 6 of 6 points to evict	Matheus; 6 of 6 points to evict	Geralda; 5 of 6 points to evict	Ronan; 6 of 6 points to evict	Maria Claudia; 0 of 6 points to win
Survived	Geralda; 53% to save	Daniel; 35% to evict	Ana Paula; 46% to evict	Ronan; 26% to move	Ronan; 47% to evict	Ana Paula; 0 of 6 points to evict	Ana Paula; 0 of 6 points to evict	Munik; 0 of 6 points to evict	Geralda; 0 of 6 points to evict	Geralda; 0 of 6 points to evict	Ronan; 1 of 6 points to evict	Munik; 0 of 6 points to evict	Munik; 6 of 6 points to win
Survived	Matheus; 61% to save	Daniel; 35% to evict	Ana Paula; 46% to evict	Ronan; 26% to move	Ronan; 47% to evict	Ana Paula; 0 of 6 points to evict	Munik; 0 of 6 points to evict	Ronan; 0 of 6 points to evict	Ronan; 0 of 6 points to evict	Geralda; 0 of 6 points to evict	Ronan; 1 of 6 points to evict	Munik; 0 of 6 points to evict	Munik; 6 of 6 points to win

=== Notes ===
- ^Note 1: Alan and Daniel gained R$10,000 and Ronan and Tamiel two immunities, for having won the first HoH competition in group.
- ^Note 2: Fernanda, Geralda, Matheus and William entered on Day 3, already nominated. The audience should vote for two of them to become a full housemates. On Day 6, Geralda and Matheus were the winners of the vote, becoming official housemates, while Fernanda and William were evicted from the house. By winning the voting, Geralda and Matheus had immunity on the first nomination.
- ^Note 3: Ronan answered the Big Phone and won an extra immunity.
- ^Note 4: Week 3 featured a fake round of nominations. The public voted for which housemate between the two nominees Ana Paula and Ronan, would enter the Apartment and be able to watch their fellow housemates on a television screen for two days, and then return to the house on Thursday, with immunity. Ana Paula won the vote and was fake evicted on day 22.
- ^Note 5: Both Renan and Tamiel won the HoH's challenge this week. Tamiel chose to win the immunity, while Renan gained R$10,000 but was still eligible to be nominated by housemates.
- ^Note 6: From this eviction onwards, eviction voting will not be based on the total number of votes received. Instead it will be regional based.
- ^Note 7: Both Renan and Tamiel won the HoH's challenge this week. Renan chose to win the immunity and R$10,000, while Tamiel gained a car but was still eligible to be nominated by housemates.
- ^Note 8: Tamiel answered the Big Phone and had to choose two housemates to wear a bracelet (Ana Paula and Ronan). On Sunday, he nominated one of them (Ana Paula) automatically for eviction. He should keep the informations as a secret until Sunday in order to escape from being automatically nominated.
- ^Note 9: Ana Paula was ejected on day 47 due to violent behaviour towards Renan.
- ^Note 10: Host Pedro Bial announced on day 45 that the contestant who received immunity by the PoI holder would have the power to make a killer nomination before the HoH and house's votes. Geralda nominated Adélia.
- ^Note 11: Munik and Renan received the most nominations with three each. Renan, the Head of Household, had the casting vote and chose Munik to be the third nominee.
- ^Note 12: Week 8 featured a twist. The last housemate to enter in the Diary Room on Sunday morning would enter the Apartment and be able to watch their fellow housemates on a television screen and then return to the house on Sunday night it nominated one housemate automatically for eviction. Renan won the task and chose Geralda to be the first nominee.
- ^Note 13: There were no nominations at week 10. The last four housemates competed in four competitions during four days (Days 66, 69, 71 and 73) to decide the next HoH.
- ^Note 14: Maria Claudia won the Head of Household competition, won immunity and nominated Geralda for eviction. Since Munik and Ronan's votes would cancel each other out, only Geralda was eligible to nominate. She chose Ronan to be the second nominee.
- ^Note 15: In the last competition of the season, Maria Claudia won the endurance challenge and become the first finalist. Therefore, Munik and Ronan were automatically nominated for eviction by default.
- ^Note 16: For the final, the public will vote for the housemate they want to win Big Brother Brasil 16.

=== Have and Have-Nots ===
	Week 1	Week 2	Week 3	Week 4	Week 5	Week 6	Week 7	Week 8	Week 9
Munik	Have	Have-Not	Have	Have	Have-Not	Have	Have	Have	Have
Maria Claudia	Have-Not	~~Have~~	Have	Have-Not	Have	Have	Have	Have	Have
Ronan	Have	Have-Not	Have	Have-Not	Have-Not	Have	Have	Have-Not	Have-Not
Geralda	Have-Not	Have-Not	Have-Not	Have-Not	Have-Not	Have	Have	Have-Not	Have-Not
Matheus	Have-Not	~~Have~~	Have	Have-Not	Have	Have	Have	Have	Have
Renan	Have	Have-Not	Have-Not	Have	Have	Have	Have	Have	
Adélia	Have-Not	~~Have~~	Have-Not	Have	Have	Have	Have		
Ana Paula	Have	~~Have~~	Have	Have-Not	Have-Not	Have			
Tamiel	Have	Have-Not	Have-Not	Have	Have	Have			
Juliana	Have-Not	Have-Not	Have	Have	Have				
Daniel	Have	~~Have~~	Have-Not	Have					
Alan	Have	~~Have~~							
Laércio	Have	~~Have~~							
Harumi	Have-Not								
Fernanda	Have-Not								
William	Have-Not								

On week 2, the whole house became Have-Nots due to punishment for Renan eating an apple, which is not included in the have-not diet.

On week 6, the whole house became Have due to the Guaraná Antarctica surprise.

== Ratings ==
Week	Ibope Rating	Kantar Ibope (viewers in millions)	Weekly rank	Most watched episode (in points)	Most watched episode (in millions)
January 19—January 24	22.8	8.79	3	27.4	9.7
January 25—January 31	23.4	8.51	3	26.2	9.3
February 1—February 7	23.6	9.21	2	31.2	10.53
February 8—February 14
