= Power Couple (Brazilian TV series) season 3 =

Power Couple
- Season 3
- Hosted by: Gugu Liberato
- No. of days: 66
- No. of contestants: 22 (11 couples)
- Winners: Tati & Marcelo
- Runners-up: Aritana & Paulo
- No. of episodes: 48

Release
- Original network: RecordTV
- Original release: April 24 – June 28, 2018

Season chronology
- ← Previous; Season 2 Next → Season 4

The third season of Power Couple premiered on Tuesday, April 24, 2018 at 10:30 p.m. on RecordTV.

The show features eleven celebrity couples living under one roof and facing extreme challenges that will test how well they really know each other. Each week, a couple will be eliminated until the last couple wins the grand prize.

Gugu Liberato replaced Roberto Justus as the main host and production moved from São Paulo to Itapecerica da Serra (using the same House from A Fazenda 9: Nova Chance).

In February 2018, RecordTV announced that various changes would occur with the format. For the first time, the show will air in real time and five times a week (Monday to Friday). At the end of each cycle, viewers at home will determine which one of the bottom two couples will continue in the game.

Tati Minerato & Marcelo Galatico won the competition with 60.98% of the public vote over Aritana Maroni & Paulo Rogério and took home the R$303.000 prize they accumulated during the show. Aritana & Paulo received R$122.800 (20% of their final jackpot) as the runners-up.

== Cast ==
=== Couples ===
Celebrity	Occupation	Partner	Occupation	Status
Aloísio Chulapa	Former football player	Luisa Albuquerque	Pharmaceutical	Eliminated 1st on May 1, 2018
André Di Mauro	Actor	Liége Müller	Actress	Eliminated 2nd on May 8, 2018
Thais Bianca Returned on May 29	Businesswoman	Douglas D'Amore; Returned on May 29	Businessman	Eliminated 3rd on May 15, 2018
Franciele Grossi	Digital influencer	Diego Grossi	Advertising	Disqualified on May 19, 2018
Vinícius D'Black Returned on May 29	Singer	Nadja Pessoa; Returned on May 29	Businesswoman	Eliminated 4th on May 22, 2018
Créu	DJ	Lilian Simões	Producer	Eliminated 5th on May 29, 2018
Vinícius D'Black	Singer	Nadja Pessoa	Businesswoman	Eliminated 6th on June 5, 2018
Nizo Neto	Comedian	Tatí Presser	Sex therapist	Eliminated 7th on June 12, 2018
Marlon	Singer	Letícia Vieira	Physiotherapist	Eliminated 8th on June 19, 2018
Thais Bianca	Businesswoman	Douglas D'Amore	Businessman	Eliminated 9th on June 26, 2018
Munik Nunes	Digital influencer	Anderson Felicio	Businessman	Eliminated 10th on June 28, 2018
Aritana Maroni	Chef	Paulo Rogério	Manager	Runner-up on June 28, 2018
Tati Minerato	Model	Marcelo Galatico	Musical entrepreneur	Winners on June 28, 2018

== Future appearances ==
After this season, in 2018, Aloísio Chulapa (from Aloísio & Luisa) and Nadja Pessoa (from Vinícius & Nadja) appeared in A Fazenda 10. Chulapa finished in 12th place, while Nadja finished in 10th place after being ejected because of violent behaviour.

After this season, in 2018, Nizo Neto (from Nizo & Tatí) and Franciele Grossi (from Franciele & Diego) appeared in Dancing Brasil 4. Franciele finished in 13th place, while Nizo finished in 11th place.

In 2019, Vinícius D'Black (from Vinícius & Nadja) appeared in Dancing Brasil 5, he won the competition. In 2024, Vinícius appeared in A Fazenda 16, he entered in the Warehouse where the public voted for four contestants to move into the main house, he didn't receive enough votes to enter in the game.

In 2019, Diego Grossi (from Franciele & Diego) appeared in A Fazenda 11, he finished in 3rd place in the competition.

In 2021, Nadja Pessoa (from Vinícius & Nadja) appeared in Ilha Record 1, she finished in 6th place in the competition. In 2023, Nadja appeared in A Fazenda 15, she entered in the Warehouse where the public voted for four contestants to move into the main house, she received 34.26% of the votes and entered the game. She finished in 7th place in the competition.

In 2022, MC Créu (from Créu & Lilian) appeared in A Fazenda 14, he entered in the Warehouse where the public voted for one contestant to move into the main house, he didn't receive enough votes to enter in the game.

== The game ==
Key

Men's challenge bet	Women's challenge bet	**T** Total money combined	Passed the challenge (adds the betting sum)	Failed the challenge (deducts the betting sum)	Won couples' challenge (immunity and adds R$20.000)

=== Challenges' results ===
		Week 1	Week 2	Week 3	Week 4	Week 5		Week 6	Week 7	Week 8	Week 9	Week 10	
		Week 1	Week 2	Week 3	Week 4	Day 36	Day 37	Week 6	Week 7	Week 8	Week 9	Day 66	Finale
Sum of money		R$40.000	R$40.000	R$40.000	R$40.000	R$40.000		R$40.000	R$40.000	R$40.000	R$40.000		Final jackpot
Bets
Tati & Marcelo		R$05.000	R$19.000	R$15.000	R$06.000	R$20.000		R$11.000	R$10.000	R$14.000	R$18.000	—N/a	R$303.000
Tati & Marcelo		R$15.000	R$21.000	R$20.000	R$06.000	R$21.000		R$28.000	R$10.000	R$00.000	R$10.000	—N/a	R$303.000
Tati & Marcelo	T	R$30.000	R$42.000	R$05.000	R$28.000	R$71.000		R$01.000	R$40.000	R$54.000	R$32.000	Finalist	R$303.000
Aritana & Paulo		R$08.000	R$10.000	R$03.000	R$10.000	R$26.000		R$09.000	R$07.000	R$13.000	R$13.000	—N/a	R$614.000
Aritana & Paulo		R$11.000	R$03.000	R$13.000	R$00.000	R$10.000		R$10.000	R$06.000	R$01.000	R$13.000	—N/a	R$614.000
Aritana & Paulo	T	R$41.000	R$101.000	R$30.000	R$50.000	R$106.000		R$59.000	R$59.000	R$72.000	R$86.000	Finalist	R$614.000
Munik & Anderson		R$06.000	R$21.000	R$20.000	R$04.000	R$30.000		R$22.000	R$21.000	R$25.000	R$21.000	—N/a	R$446.000
Munik & Anderson		R$34.000	R$28.000	R$22.000	R$44.000	R$26.000		R$31.000	R$19.000	R$15.000	R$21.000	—N/a	R$446.000
Munik & Anderson	T	R$12.000	R$89.000	R$42.000	R$00.000	R$96.000		R$83.000	R$42.000	R$00.000	R$82.000	Eliminated	R$446.000
Thais & Douglas		R$10.000	R$08.000	R$00.000			—N/a	R$08.000	R$00.000	R$10.000	R$32.000		~~R$79.000~~; R$241.000
Thais & Douglas		R$17.000	R$11.000	R$17.000			—N/a	R$20.000	R$11.000	R$06.000	R$08.000		~~R$79.000~~; R$241.000
Thais & Douglas	T	R$13.000	R$43.000	R$23.000			R$100.000	R$68.000	R$29.000	R$44.000	R$00.000		~~R$79.000~~; R$241.000
Marlon & Letícia		R$23.000	R$13.000	R$17.000	R$05.000	R$25.000		R$07.000	R$03.000	R$15.000			R$413.000
Marlon & Letícia		R$21.000	R$08.000	R$23.000	R$11.000	R$19.000		R$30.000	R$05.000	R$05.000			R$413.000
Marlon & Letícia	T	R$104.000	R$35.000	R$20.000	R$76.000	R$84.000		R$37.000	R$42.000	R$20.000			R$413.000
Nizo & Tatí		R$05.000	R$15.000	R$01.000	R$13.000	R$50.000		R$00.000	R$01.000				R$291.000
Nizo & Tatí		R$22.000	R$15.000	R$19.000	R$27.000	R$20.000		R$17.000	R$02.000				R$291.000
Nizo & Tatí	T	R$13.000	R$70.000	R$20.000	R$28.000	R$110.000		R$23.000	R$27.000				R$291.000
Vinícius & Nadja		R$02.000	R$09.000	R$16.000	R$07.000		—N/a	R$10.000					~~R$103.000~~; R$147.000
Vinícius & Nadja		R$10.000	R$01.000	R$18.000	R$16.000		—N/a	R$03.000					~~R$103.000~~; R$147.000
Vinícius & Nadja	T	R$18.000	R$30.000	R$38.000	R$17.000		R$100.000	R$47.000					~~R$103.000~~; R$147.000
Créu & Lilian		R$11.000	R$07.000	R$02.000	R$03.000	R$22.000							R$188.000
Créu & Lilian		R$05.000	R$07.000	R$10.000	R$05.000	R$18.000							R$188.000
Créu & Lilian	T	R$14.000	R$54.000	R$28.000	R$48.000	R$44.000							R$188.000
Franciele & Diego		R$01.000	R$20.000	R$35.000	R$23.000								R$223.000
Franciele & Diego		R$20.000	R$20.000	R$25.000	R$01.000								R$223.000
Franciele & Diego	T	R$21.000	R$40.000	R$100.000	R$62.000								R$223.000
André & Liége		R$07.000	R$01.000										R$68.000
André & Liége		R$18.000	R$38.000										R$68.000
André & Liége	T	R$29.000	R$39.000										R$68.000
Aloísio & Luisa		R$09.000											R$12.000
Aloísio & Luisa		R$19.000											R$12.000
Aloísio & Luisa	T	R$12.000											R$12.000
Notes		1	2	(none)		3	4	(none)	5	(none)		6	(none)
Least money (pre-challenge)		Aloísio; Luisa	Vinícius; Nadja	Tati; Marcelo	Munik; Anderson	Créu; Lilian		Marlon; Letícia	Nizo; Tatí				
Least money (pre-challenge)		Munik; Anderson	Marlon; Letícia	Marlon; Letícia	Vinícius; Nadja	Tati; Marcelo		Tati; Marcelo	Thais; Douglas	Munik; Anderson	Thais; Douglas		
Couples' challenge winners		Aritana; Paulo	Aritana; Paulo	Marlon; Letícia	Marlon; Letícia	Aritana; Paulo	Thais; Douglas	Marlon; Letícia	Aritana; Paulo	Aritana; Paulo	Aritana; Paulo	Tati; Marcelo	
Nominated
Couples' challenge losers		Aloísio; Luisa	André; Liége	Thais; Douglas	Nizo; Tatí	Créu; Lilian		Vinícius; Nadja	Marlon; Letícia	Marlon; Letícia	Thais; Douglas	Munik; Anderson	
Least money (post-challenge)		Munik; Anderson	Vinícius; Nadja	Tati; Marcelo	Munik; Anderson	Tati; Marcelo		Tati; Marcelo	Nizo; Tatí	Munik; Anderson	Tati; Marcelo		
Least money (post-challenge)		Thais; Douglas	Marlon; Letícia	Nizo; Tatí	Vinícius; Nadja	Marlon; Letícia		Nizo; Tatí	Thais; Douglas				

==== Notes ====
- **^Note 1** : The three couples with the most money in their Bank accounts after the first Women's challenge were allowed to choose one of three color-coded special boxes (red, green, and yellow). Marlon & Letícia chose the green box, awarding them with an extra R$ 20.000 to bet on the upcoming Men's challenge, which would be equally taken from two other couples (Créu & Lilian and Vinícius & Nadja lost R$ 10.000 each). Créu & Lilian chose the red box, awarding them with a brand new car. Vinícius & Nadja were left with the yellow box, awarding them the power to ban a couple from compete in the first Couple's challenge (Marlon & Letícia).
- **^Note 2** : Half of André & Liége's money won on week 2 was stolen by Aritana & Paulo due to the use of their Special power on week 1's elimination ceremony.
- **^Note 3** : Aritana & Paulo's sum of money was R$ 50.000, while Tati & Marcelo's was R$ 30.000 due to the use of Marlon & Letícia's Special power on week 4.
- **^Note 4** : No bets were made on the live Wildcard round. Instead, both returning couples Thais & Douglas (by winning the Couples' challenge) and Vinícius & Nadja (by winning the public vote) won R$100.000 each to be added to their new bank accounts in the game.
- **^Note 5** : Marlon & Letícia's sum of money was increased from R$ 40.000 to R$ 50.000, due to the use their Special power on week 6's elimination ceremony.
- **^Note 6** : No bets were made on the first part of the Finale. Instead, the final Couples' Challenge losing couple would be automatically eliminated. Tati & Marcelo won the challenge followed by Aritana & Paulo. In last place, Munik & Anderson were eliminated.

=== Special power ===
For the first 7 weeks, the Couple's challenge winners randomly picked two out of eight boxes from the Tree of Power of the following colors: blue, green, orange, pink, purple, red, white and yellow. Then, the couple would be given a choice between two advantages in the game; the couple's choice is marked in bold.

Results

Week	Couples' challenge winners	Advantages
1	Aritana & Paulo	Chose a couple to have their sum of money reduced by R$10.000 and another to have their sum of money increased by R$10.000.; **Choose a couple to share next week's profit with them**. →**André & Liége**
2	Aritana & Paulo	Choose a couple who must bet their entire money at the next Men or Women's challenges.; **A double vote at this week's Elimination ceremony**. →**Aritana & Paulo's vote on Marlon & Letícia**
3	Marlon & Letícia	Ban a couple from competing in next week's Couple's challenge.; **An advantage at the next Men's or Women's challenges**. →**Women's challenge**
4	Marlon & Letícia	Choose a couple who must bet their entire money at the next Men or Women's challenges.; **Chose a couple to have their sum of money reduced by R$10.000 and another to have their sum of money increased by R$10.000**. →**Tati & Marcelo and Aritana & Paulo**
5	Aritana & Paulo	Not revealed.; **An advantage at the next Couples' challenge, but also choosing a couple to have a disadvantage**. →**Vinícius & Nadja**
6	Marlon & Letícia	Chose a couple to do all the laundry and dishes during the week.; **Becoming not eligible to vote but have their sum of money increased by R$10.000**. →**Marlon & Letícia**
7	Aritana & Paulo	Chose a couple to have their sum of money reduced to R$10.000; **Chose to cancel this week's 'couple's save' choice, nullifying all the votes cast**. →**Nizo & Tatí**

=== Voting history ===
	Week 1	Week 2	Week 3	Week 4	Week 5		Week 6	Week 7	Week 8	Week 9	Week 10	
	Week 1	Week 2	Week 3	Week 4	Day 34	Day 36	Week 6	Week 7	Week 8	Week 9	Day 65	Finale
Power Couple	Marlon; Letícia	Aritana; Paulo	Franciele; Diego	Marlon; Letícia	Nizo; Tatí	(none)	Munik; Anderson	Aritana; Paulo	Aritana; Paulo	Aritana; Paulo	Tati; Marcelo	(none)
Nominated	Aloísio; Luisa	André; Liége	Nizo; Tatí	Nizo; Tatí	Créu; Lilian	(none)	Nizo; Tatí	Marlon; Letícia	Marlon; Letícia	Tati; Marcelo	Aritana; Paulo	(none)
Nominated	Munik; Anderson	Marlon; Letícia	Tati; Marcelo	Munik; Anderson	Marlon; Letícia	(none)	Tati; Marcelo	Nizo; Tatí	Marlon; Letícia	Tati; Marcelo	Munik; Anderson	(none)
Nominated	Munik; Anderson	Marlon; Letícia	Tati; Marcelo	Munik; Anderson	Marlon; Letícia	(none)	Tati; Marcelo	Nizo; Tatí	Munik; Anderson	Thais; Douglas	Munik; Anderson	(none)
Nominated	Thais; Douglas	Vinícius; Nadja	Thais; Douglas	Vinícius; Nadja	Tati; Marcelo	(none)	Vinícius; Nadja	Thais; Douglas	Munik; Anderson	Thais; Douglas	Tati; Marcelo	(none)
Tati & Marcelo	Thais; Douglas	Vinícius; Nadja	Nominated	Munik; Anderson	Nominated	Not eligible	Nominated	~~Nizo~~; ~~Tatí~~	Saved	Nominated	Not eligible	**Winners** (Day 66)
Aritana & Paulo	Thais; Douglas	Marlon; Letícia ^{(×2)}	Nizo; Tatí	Nizo; Tatí	Saved	Not eligible	Nizo; Tatí	~~Marlon~~; ~~Letícia~~	Power Couple	Power Couple	Not eligible	**Runner-up** (Day 66)
Munik & Anderson	Nominated	Vinícius; Nadja	Tati; Marcelo	Nominated	Saved	Not eligible	Vinícius; Nadja	~~Nizo~~; ~~Tatí~~	Nominated	Saved	Not eligible	Eliminated (Day 66)
Thais & Douglas	Nominated	Marlon; Letícia	Nominated	Eliminated (Day 22)		Returned	Tati; Marcelo	Nominated	Saved	Nominated	Re-Eliminated (Day 64)	
Marlon & Letícia	Thais; Douglas	Nominated	Nizo; Tatí	Nizo; Tatí	Nominated	Not eligible	Banned	Nominated	Nominated	Eliminated (Day 57)		
Nizo & Tatí	Thais; Douglas	Marlon; Letícia	Nominated	Nominated	Power Couple	Not eligible	Nominated	Nominated	Eliminated (Day 50)			
Vinícius & Nadja	Munik; Anderson	Nominated	Tati; Marcelo	Nominated	Eliminated (Day 29)	Returned	Nominated	Re-Eliminated (Day 43)				
Créu & Lilian	Munik; Anderson	André; Liége	Thais; Douglas	Nizo; Tatí	Nominated	Eliminated (Day 36)						
Franciele & Diego	Aloísio; Luisa	Marlon; Letícia	Nizo; Tatí	Ejected (Day 26)								
André & Liége	Thais; Douglas	Nominated	Eliminated (Day 15)									
Aloísio & Luisa	Nominated	Eliminated (Day 8)										
Notes	(none)	7	(none)	8	9	10	11, 12	13	(none)		6	14
Ejected	(none)			**Franciele**; **Diego**	(none)							
Couple's save	Thais; Douglas	Marlon; Letícia	Nizo; Tatí	Nizo; Tatí	(none)		Nizo; Tatí	~~Nizo~~; ~~Tatí~~	(none)			
Sent to elimination	Aloísio; Luisa	André; Liége	Tati; Marcelo	Munik; Anderson	Créu; Lilian		Tati; Marcelo	Marlon; Letícia	Marlon; Letícia	Tati; Marcelo	Aritana; Paulo	Aritana; Paulo
Sent to elimination	Aloísio; Luisa	André; Liége	Tati; Marcelo	Munik; Anderson	Marlon; Letícia		Tati; Marcelo	Nizo; Tatí	Marlon; Letícia	Tati; Marcelo	Munik; Anderson	Aritana; Paulo
Sent to elimination	Munik; Anderson	Vinícius; Nadja	Thais; Douglas	Vinícius; Nadja	Marlon; Letícia		Vinícius; Nadja	Nizo; Tatí	Munik; Anderson	Thais; Douglas	Munik; Anderson	Tati; Marcelo
Sent to elimination	Munik; Anderson	Vinícius; Nadja	Thais; Douglas	Vinícius; Nadja	Tati; Marcelo		Vinícius; Nadja	Thais; Douglas	Munik; Anderson	Thais; Douglas	Tati; Marcelo	Tati; Marcelo
Eliminated	**Aloísio**; **Luisa**; 25.79% to save	**André**; **Liége**; 40.77% to save	**Thais**; **Douglas**; 25.91% to save	**Vinícius**; **Nadja**; 41.53% to save	**Créu**; **Lilian**; 19.99% to save	**Thais**; **Douglas**; Won couples' challenge	**Vinícius**; **Nadja**; 48.41% to save	**Nizo**; **Tatí**; 20.37% to save	**Marlon**; **Letícia**; 38.60% to save	**Thais**; **Douglas**; 32.67% to save	**Munik**; **Anderson**; Lost couples' challenge	**Aritana**; **Paulo**; 39.02% to win
Eliminated	**Aloísio**; **Luisa**; 25.79% to save	**André**; **Liége**; 40.77% to save	**Thais**; **Douglas**; 25.91% to save	**Vinícius**; **Nadja**; 41.53% to save	**Créu**; **Lilian**; 19.99% to save	**Vinícius**; **Nadja**; 60.52% to re-enter	**Vinícius**; **Nadja**; 48.41% to save	**Nizo**; **Tatí**; 20.37% to save	**Marlon**; **Letícia**; 38.60% to save	**Thais**; **Douglas**; 32.67% to save	**Munik**; **Anderson**; Lost couples' challenge	**Aritana**; **Paulo**; 39.02% to win
Saved	**Munik**; **Anderson**; 74.21% to save	**Vinícius**; **Nadja**; 59.23% to save	**Tati**; **Marcelo**; 74.09% to save	**Munik**; **Anderson**; 58.47% to save	**Marlon**; **Letícia**; Most votes to save	**Aloísio**; **Luisa**; Fewest votes to re-enter	**Tati**; **Marcelo**; 51.59% to save	**Marlon**; **Letícia**; Most votes to save	**Munik**; **Anderson**; 61.40% to save	**Tati**; **Marcelo**; 67.33% to save	**Aritana**; **Paulo**; Finalist couples' challenge	**Tati**; **Marcelo**; 60.98% to win
Saved	**Munik**; **Anderson**; 74.21% to save	**Vinícius**; **Nadja**; 59.23% to save	**Tati**; **Marcelo**; 74.09% to save	**Munik**; **Anderson**; 58.47% to save	**Marlon**; **Letícia**; Most votes to save	**André**; **Liége**; Fewest votes to re-enter	**Tati**; **Marcelo**; 51.59% to save	**Marlon**; **Letícia**; Most votes to save	**Munik**; **Anderson**; 61.40% to save	**Tati**; **Marcelo**; 67.33% to save	**Aritana**; **Paulo**; Finalist couples' challenge	**Tati**; **Marcelo**; 60.98% to win
Saved	**Munik**; **Anderson**; 74.21% to save	**Vinícius**; **Nadja**; 59.23% to save	**Tati**; **Marcelo**; 74.09% to save	**Munik**; **Anderson**; 58.47% to save	**Tati**; **Marcelo**; Most votes to save	**André**; **Liége**; Fewest votes to re-enter	**Tati**; **Marcelo**; 51.59% to save	**Thais**; **Douglas**; Most votes to save	**Munik**; **Anderson**; 61.40% to save	**Tati**; **Marcelo**; 67.33% to save	**Tati**; **Marcelo**; Finalist couples' challenge	**Tati**; **Marcelo**; 60.98% to win
Saved	**Munik**; **Anderson**; 74.21% to save	**Vinícius**; **Nadja**; 59.23% to save	**Tati**; **Marcelo**; 74.09% to save	**Munik**; **Anderson**; 58.47% to save	**Tati**; **Marcelo**; Most votes to save	**Créu**; **Lilian**; Fewest votes to re-enter	**Tati**; **Marcelo**; 51.59% to save	**Thais**; **Douglas**; Most votes to save	**Munik**; **Anderson**; 61.40% to save	**Tati**; **Marcelo**; 67.33% to save	**Tati**; **Marcelo**; Finalist couples' challenge	**Tati**; **Marcelo**; 60.98% to win

==== Notes ====
- **^Note 7** : Aritana & Paulo cast two votes to save Marlon & Letícia after choosing the red box as a reward for winning that week couples' challenge.
- **^Note 8** : Franciele & Diego were ejected from the competition after Diego threatened Anderson's physical integrity during an altercation off-camera between the two of them. The fight started when the men were returning from a reward and reportedly drunk Anderson made offensive comments using homophobic slurs to Diego, Nizo and the van driver. Anderson was given a formal warning for his behaviour by the Power Couple production and stated that he didn't offend the van driver because he thought it was all a joke. However, during week 4's live elimination ceremony, Anderson said to host Gugu Liberato he was wrong and shouldn't have made the comments.
- **^Note 9** : There was no 'couples' save' during week 5's elimination ceremony, therefore, all three nominated couples were against the public vote.
- **^Note 10** : After Créu & Lilian's elimination, all previous eliminated couples (minus Franciele & Diego) received a chance to return through a live Wildcard couples' challenge. Thais & Douglas won the challenge and returned to the game. However, due to Franciele & Diego's unexpected disqualification, Gugu Liberato announced that a second couple would also return, this time by public vote. Vinícius & Nadja received the most votes with 60.52% and came back to the competition as well.
- **^Note 11** : Couples' challenge winners Marlon & Letícia were not eligible to vote on the elimination ceremony due to the use of their Special power.
- **^Note 12** : At the end of week 6's couples' save vote, Nizo & Tatí, Tati & Marcelo and Vinícius & Nadja were all tied with one vote each. Per the rules, since Nizo & Tatí have the most money in their overall Bank account, they were saved from elimination, thus sending Tati & Marcelo and Vinícius & Nadja to the public vote.
- **^Note 13** : Couples' challenge winners Aritana & Paulo used their Special power to cancel this week's 'couple's save' choice, nullifying all the votes cast and sending all three nominated couples to the public vote.
- **^Note 14** : Following the live final elimination, the public votes for the couple they want to win Power Couple Brasil 3.

== Ratings and reception ==
=== Brazilian ratings ===
All numbers are in points and provided by Kantar Ibope Media.

Week	First air date	Last air date	Timeslot (BRT)	Daily SP viewers (in points)					SP viewers (in points)	BR viewers (in points)	Source
Week	First air date	Last air date	Timeslot (BRT)	Mon	Tue	Wed	Thu	Fri	SP viewers (in points)	BR viewers (in points)	Source
1	April 24, 2018	April 27, 2018	Monday to Friday; 10:30 p.m.	—	7.4	7.9	7.1	6.6	7.2	—N/a	
2	April 30, 2018	May 4, 2018	Monday to Friday; 10:30 p.m.	6.2	5.8	8.6	7.3	7.9	7.2	—N/a	
3	May 7, 2018	May 11, 2018	Monday to Friday; 10:30 p.m.	6.7	6.4	9.5	6.6	4.6	6.8	—N/a	
4	May 14, 2018	May 18, 2018	Monday to Friday; 10:30 p.m.	6.3	6.5	8.3	7.6	8.2	7.4	—N/a	
5	May 21, 2018	May 25, 2018	Monday to Friday; 10:30 p.m.	8.5	7.8	9.6	8.4	8.4	8.5	—N/a	
6	May 28, 2018	June 1, 2018	Monday to Friday; 10:30 p.m.	7.1	7.8	9.8	7.5	7.3	7.9	—N/a	
7	June 4, 2018	June 8, 2018	Monday to Friday; 10:30 p.m.	8.5	7.7	8.7	8.9	8.8	8.5	—N/a	
8	June 11, 2018	June 15, 2018	Monday to Friday; 10:30 p.m.	8.2	8.4	8.9	9.2	9.0	8.7	7.5	
9	June 18, 2018	June 22, 2018	Monday to Friday; 10:30 p.m.	8.4	7.9	7.6	9.2	8.8	8.4	7.1	
10	June 25, 2018	June 28, 2018	Monday to Friday; 10:30 p.m.	8.3	7.8	7.3	9.0	—	8.3	7.5	

- In 2018, each point represents 248.647 households in 15 market cities in Brazil (71.855 households in São Paulo only)
