= A Fazenda 15 =

- Season 15
- Hosted by: Adriane Galisteu
- No. of days: 96
- No. of contestants: 22
- Winner: Jaquelline Grohalski
- Runner-up: André Gonçalves
- Companion show: A Fazenda Online
- No. of episodes: 94

Release
- Original network: RecordTV
- Original release: 19 September – 21 December 2023

Season chronology
- ← Previous; Season 14 Next → Season 16

A Fazenda 15 (Note: also taglined as A Fazenda 15: Baseada em Histórias Reais. (English: A Fazenda 15: Based on True Stories.)) was the fifteenth season of the Brazilian reality show A Fazenda broadcast by RecordTV, which premiered on 19 September 2023, and concluded on 21 December 2023. Hosted by Adriane Galisteu, the season featured 22 contestants competing for the prize of R$1.5 million, under the general direction of Rodrigo Carelli.

On 21 December 2023, digital influencer Jaquelline Grohalski won the competition with 56.17% of the public vote over actor André Gonçalves (25.77%), former volleyball player Márcia Fu (12.78%) and digital influencer WL Guimarães (5.28%). Jaquelline received R$1.5 million and an electric car model BYD Dolphin. André was awarded R$100.000 prize and Márcia R$50.000 prize for finishing in second and third place, respectively.

== Overview ==
=== Broadcast ===
The show was broadcast daily by RecordTV. The transmission was carried out on pay-per-view (PPV) 24 hours a day, through the streaming service for PlayPlus subscribers. It aired from Monday to Saturday at 10:45 PM and on Sundays at 11:00 PM.

The final stretch of the season began after the elimination of Radamés Furlan and Cezar Black on 14 December 2023, and lasted for 7 days, covering the last 2 eliminations until the Grand Finale on 21 December 2023.

== Format ==
The fifteenth season features twenty-two contestants. The schedule of the reality show remains the same:

- Sunday: Highlights of the week and Farmer's Ranch.
- Monday: Fire Challenge and Nomination Dynamics.
- Tuesday: Formation of the Nomination.
- Wednesday: Farmer's Challenge.
- Thursday: Elimination.
- Friday: Post-elimination and live flashes of the Party.
- Saturday: Everything that happened at the party and post-party on Friday.

=== Instructors ===
During their time in confinement, the contestants have to perform various daily tasks involving animals and the plantation, being accompanied by instructors who teach them how to care for the animals and maintain the farm.

- Diogo Barbieri — Caretaker
- Fernanda Manelli — Zootechnician
- Eryck Pinareli — Veterinarian

=== SofáZenda ===
The comedian Márvio Lúcio, known as Carioca, hosts "SofáZenda," a segment set in a fixed scenario simulating a TV room. With a good dose of humor and relaxation, Carioca follows everything that happens in the confinement, commenting and cheering like a viewer, occasionally interacting with Adriane Galisteu when appropriate. In "SofáZenda," the comedian plays himself and also his wife in a sketch where the two characters talk about the week's events in the reality show.

=== Cabine de Descompressão ===
The fifteenth season of A Fazenda features the Cabine de Descompressão (Decompression Booth), exclusively available to PlayPlus subscribers. In this segment, Lucas Maciel interviews the eliminated contestant of the week just minutes after their eviction, questioning them about their actions, showing videos from the confinement, and discussing the public's reaction on social media.

== Controversies ==
=== Accusations of homophobia ===
During the formation of the Week 2's nominations on 3 October 2023, and the following day, Cariúcha and Yuri Meirelles used homophobic terms to refer to Lucas Souza during arguments.

The incident caused outrage on social media, with calls for Yuri's ejection and the deactivation of Cariúcha's official Instagram profile.

During the live broadcast of the week's Farmer's competition, the host Adriane Galisteu condemned homophobia without mentioning the contestant, emphasizing the unacceptability of prejudice, with a threat of ejection for persistent behavior.

=== Attempts at external interference ===
On 5 October 2023, Darlan Cunha, known as Laranjinha, tried to circumvent the rules by agreeing with Cariúcha and Jenny Miranda to give signals about the repercussion of both contestants with the public during the plaque activity in the "A Fazenda — Last Chance" section of the "Hora do Faro" program. Due to this attempt, Laranjinha's contact with the contestants was prohibited, and his signs were not shown to the contestants.

On 31 October 2023, a sound car near the studios broadcast a message that caused the PlayPlus broadcast to be suspended for more than 40 minutes, saying: "Attention! Jenny is canceled. Kally, watch out for Warehouse. Rachel winner!".

On 12 November 2023, another sound car drove around the show's headquarters, but the contestants were unable to hear the content of the message clearly, so everyone remained inside the main House with the music playing loudly, to prevent the message from being heard by the contestants.

=== Accusation of sexual harassment ===
Internet users accused Kamila Simioni of sexual harassment after a video went viral on social media, showing the contestant groping Shayan Haghbin's private parts moments before the formation of Week 4's nominations on 17 October. There were calls for Simioni's ejection, and Shayan's team rejected the move, while the businesswoman's team stated that the two were close enough to do so.

On 23 October, Shayan alleged that Kamila, under the influence of alcohol, had bitten his genitals during a party, generating more controversy and calls for ejection. An old video showed Kamila biting Shayan's private parts again, leading to the resurgence of the hashtag #SIMIONIEJECTED on social media. Simioni's team said the actions were friendly banter and were not intended to violate Shayan's rights. After that, the tag #SIMIONIEJECTED started circulating on social media again.

=== Rachel's ejection ===
On 19 October 2023, during the delegation of animal tasks, the Farmer of the week Jenny Miranda assigned Rachel Sheherazade to take care of the sheep. Sheherazade promptly said she would not do the job, pointing out that she was sore from taking care of the garbage the previous week, and that if she put her in the role, the Farmer should do it in her place. The journalist's refusal to choose Jenny led to an argument between the two. The fact had repercussions at main House, since failure to perform the tasks results in severe collective punishment. After the sheep's warning sounded twice and was not answered by the participants, the workers were punished and left without gas for a period of 48 hours. As a result, a fight broke out between different workers.

That morning, after the punishment, Rachel decided that she would do the task, counting on the help of contestant Lucas Souza, which led to another confrontation between the contestants. At the time, Jenny went down to the animal area and said that she would help Rachel with the task. However, the journalist did not accept and said that she would complete the task with Lucas' help, but only for that day. During an argument in the workshop, Rachel raised her voice, Jenny shouted back at her to lower her voice and, at that moment, Rachel put her hand on the Farmer's face in an act of defense while she was cornered. The moment, which was not broadcast on PlayPlus, caused the immediate ejection of the journalist. Due to this, the public vote of the Week 4's eviction from season, formed by André Gonçalves, Kally Fonseca and Nadja Pessoa, ended up being canceled. The images of the aggression were shown on the program at night, in addition to the position of the show's management.

Rachel's ejection also had repercussions outside the program, causing many celebrities, including former contestants such as Jojo Todynho, Rico Melquiades, Bárbara Borges, Bia Miranda, Dynho Alves, Liziane Gutierrez and Gretchen, to issue a position in favor of Sheherazade and against the program. Fans of the journalist launched a campaign on social media for sponsors to terminate their contracts and for Internet users to cancel the streaming service PlayPlus, which broadcasts the program 24 hours a day. Viewers and former contestants, such as Rico and Liziane, criticized the cancellation of eviction and the lack of a position from the management in similar situations of aggression in other seasons. Rachel was considered the favorite to win the season of the show.

=== Accusation of aggression ===
During a party on 21 October 2023, Kamila Simioni hit Radamés Furlan with one of her braids, generating calls for ejection on social media with the hashtag "SIMIONI EJECTED".

At the same party, Jenny Miranda also caused controversy by hitting WL Guimarães in the face with her coat. Despite calls for her ejection, the broadcaster claimed that the events that occurred were not aggressions during a conflict.

=== Lucas's withdrawal ===
On 22 November 2023, contestant Lucas Souza left the program after some disagreements with contestants Cezar Black, Alicia X and Kally Fonseca, claiming that the coach's mental health had been shaken. The night before, during the formation of the Week 9's nominations, he had a disagreement with contestant Black, who accused him of wanting to become rich and famous at the expense of singer Jojo Todynho — information that had been revealed by Kally to the nurse.

On 20 November, after an action sponsored by Betano, he argued with Black, even threatening to physically assault him inside the confinement, even though it would result in his ejection if the subject was mentioned again by the nurse.

=== Internal interferences ===
Due to the events of the previous season and the negative repercussions among the public, this season was marked by some interventions by the show's production team, which divided the public and critics.

On 4 October, during the evening program, in addition to speaking out about the homophobic comments, the host Adriane Galisteu also denied the contestant and Kamila Simioni for another accusation made against Rachel Sheherazade. Cariúcha and Simioni claimed that Rachel had told Cariúcha not to spit on her during an argument, as it could transmit diseases, since Cariúcha is of African descent. Galisteu confirmed that the audience watched the activity and that Rachel only told her not to spit so as not to risk being ejected. Even so, both the singer and the businesswoman continued to doubt the authenticity of the host's statements. During and after the nominations of the week, Sheherazade stated that she will file a lawsuit against the singer for defamation, since the journalist had not acted racistly towards the contestant.

On 17 October, during the Week 4's nominations, Galisteu publicly clarified that Cezar Black had not assaulted Jenny Miranda at the party that week. On the day of the event, the contestant had a disagreement with Kally at the entrance to the main House and ended up having to be separated by her colleagues. During this time, WL Guimarães grabbed Jenny's arm, which the contestant believed to have been Black. With that, she accused the nurse of assault and went to the closet to ask for an analysis of the images of the moment. There was no statement from the production team at the time.

On 24 October, during the Week 5's nominations, Galisteu put an end to Kamila Simioni and Lily Nobre's story about Jaquelline Grohalski having had the desire to kiss Tonzão Chagas, supposedly referred to by her as Ton, at the party that week. In addition to the edition having recapitulated the moment, in which Jaquelline says "another man", the host denied the story live to avoid worsening the accusations, since Tonzão is engaged.

== Contestants ==
The celebrities were officially revealed by RecordTV on 14 September 2023.

Contestant	Age	Background	Hometown	Entered	Exited	Status	Finish
Nathalia Valente	20	Digital influencer	São Paulo	Day 1	Day 12	Eliminated 1st on 28 September 2023	22nd
Laranjinha	35	Actor	Rio de Janeiro	Day 1	Day 19	Eliminated 2nd on 5 October 2023	21st
Cariúcha	32	Singer	Nova Iguaçu	Day 1	Day 26	Eliminated 3rd on 12 October 2023	20th
Rachel Sheherazade	50	Journalist	João Pessoa	Day 1	Day 33	Ejected on 19 October 2023	19th
Kamila Simioni	37	Businesswoman	Belo Horizonte	Day 1	Day 40	Eliminated 4th on 26 October 2023	18th
Jenny Miranda	34	Digital influencer	São Paulo	Day 1	Day 47	Eliminated 5th on 2 November 2023	17th
Henrique Martins	31	Olympic swimmer	Campinas	Day 1	Day 54	Eliminated 6th on 9 November 2023	16th
Sander Mecca	40	Singer	São Paulo	Day 1	Day 61	Eliminated 7th on 16 November 2023	15th
Lucas Souza	23	Digital influencer	Passos	Day 1	Day 67	Walked on 22 November 2023	14th
Alicia X	23	Actress & singer	Taboão da Serra	Day 5	Day 68	Eliminated 8th on 23 November 2023	13th
Kally Fonseca	30	Singer	Natal	Day 1	Day 75	Eliminated 9th on 30 November 2023	12th
Yuri Meirelles	22	Model	Rio de Janeiro	Day 1	Day 82	Eliminated 10th on 7 December 2023	11th
Radamés Furlan	37	Football player	Rio de Janeiro	Day 1	Day 89	Eliminated 11th on 14 December 2023	10th/9th
Cezar Black	35	Nurse & digital influencer	Salvador	Day 5	Day 89	Eliminated 12th on 14 December 2023	10th/9th
Shayan Haghbin; A Fazenda 14	32	Digital influencer	Tehran, Iran	Day 5	Day 91	Eliminated 13th on 16 December 2023	8th/7th
Nadja Pessoa; A Fazenda 10	35	Businesswoman	Recife	Day 5	Day 91	Eliminated 14th on 16 December 2023	8th/7th
Lily Nobre	21	Singer	Rio de Janeiro	Day 1	Day 94	Eliminated 15th on 19 December 2023	6th/5th
Tonzão Chagas	35	Singer	Rio de Janeiro	Day 1	Day 94	Eliminated 16th on 19 December 2023	6th/5th
WL Guimarães	24	Digital influencer	Duque de Caxias	Day 1	Day 96	Fourth place on 21 December 2023	4th
Márcia Fu	54	Former volleyball player	Juiz de Fora	Day 1	Day 96	Third place on 21 December 2023	3rd
André Gonçalves	47	Actor	Rio de Janeiro	Day 1	Day 96	Runner-up on 21 December 2023	2nd
Jaquelline Grohalski	29	Model	Rolim de Moura	Day 1	Day 96	Winner on 21 December 2023	1st

== Future Appearances ==
In 2025, Radamés Furlan appeared with his wife Carol Furlan in Power Couple Brasil 7, they finished as winners from the competition.

== The game ==
=== The Warehouse ===
This season, 10 celebrities (7 former reality show contestants and 3 digital influencers from Kwai, one of the sponsors from this season) enter the Warehouse to compete in a public vote for the final 4 spots (2 men and 2 women) in the Farm, bringing the total number of contestants up to 22.

Pessoa and Haghbin previously appeared in A Fazenda 10 and A Fazenda 14 respectively. Both were ejected after aggressive behaviours. Nadja finished in 10th place, while Haghbin shared 16th-15th place with Tiago Ramos.

Candidate	Age	Background	Hometown	Entered	Exited	Status	Finish
**JP Venâncios**; Kwai	25	YouTuber	São José de Piranhas	Day 2	Day 5	Not Selected on 21 September 2023	5th
**Erick Ricarte**; A Grande Conquista 1	32	Journalist	Aracaju	Day 2	Day 5	Not Selected on 21 September 2023	4th
**Igor Freitas**; Are You the One? Brasil 1	33	Digital influencer	São João Nepomuceno	Day 2	Day 5	Not Selected on 21 September 2023	3rd
**Cezar Black**; Big Brother Brasil 23	35	Nurse & digital influencer	Salvador	Day 2	Day 5	Selected on 21 September 2023	2nd
**Shayan Haghbin**; Love Is Blind: Brazil 1	32	Digital influencer	Tehran, Iran	Day 2	Day 5	Selected on 21 September 2023	1st
**Lumena Aleluia**; Big Brother Brasil 21	32	Digital influencer	Salvador	Day 2	Day 5	Not Selected on 21 September 2023	5th
**Sol do Deboche**; Kwai	35	Digital influencer	Magé	Day 2	Day 5	Not Selected on 21 September 2023	4th
**Whendy Tavares**; Ilha Record 2	28	Digital influencer	Três Lagoas	Day 2	Day 5	Not Selected on 21 September 2023	3rd
**Alicia X** Kwai	23	Actress & singer	Taboão da Serra	Day 2	Day 5	Selected on 21 September 2023	2nd
**Nadja Pessoa**; Power Couple Brasil 3	35	Businesswoman	Recife	Day 2	Day 5	Selected on 21 September 2023	1st

=== Fire challenge ===
Each week, contestants (determined by a random draw) compete in the Fire challenge to win the Lamp power. The Lamp power entitles the holder two flames (white and orange), which may unleash good or bad consequences on the nomination process, with the orange flame power defined by the public through the show's profile on Kwai among two options.

The winner chooses a flame for itself and delegates which contestant holds the other. The Flame holder's choice is marked in bold.

Week	Players	Winner	Sent to the Stall	Consequences
1	Black	Tonzão	**Black**, **Jaquelline**, ~~Lily~~, Nathalia, André	Tonzão: The holder's vote and another contestant chosen by him will be counted as two → **Simioni**.; Laranjinha: The holder must swap a contestant in the Stall for another contestant in the House → **Lily** for **André**.
1	Jaquelline	Tonzão	**Black**, **Jaquelline**, ~~Lily~~, Nathalia, André	Tonzão: The holder's vote and another contestant chosen by him will be counted as two → **Simioni**.; Laranjinha: The holder must swap a contestant in the Stall for another contestant in the House → **Lily** for **André**.
1	Tonzão	Tonzão	**Black**, **Jaquelline**, ~~Lily~~, Nathalia, André	Tonzão: The holder's vote and another contestant chosen by him will be counted as two → **Simioni**.; Laranjinha: The holder must swap a contestant in the Stall for another contestant in the House → **Lily** for **André**.
2	Alicia	Nadja	**Alicia**, **WL**, Rachel, Laranjinha	Nadja: The holder must cancel the votes of two contestants → **Marcia**, **Shayan**.; Rachel: The holder must ban one nominee from competing in the Farmer challenge → **Tonzão**.
2	Nadja	Nadja	**Alicia**, **WL**, Rachel, Laranjinha	Nadja: The holder must cancel the votes of two contestants → **Marcia**, **Shayan**.; Rachel: The holder must ban one nominee from competing in the Farmer challenge → **Tonzão**.
2	WL	Nadja	**Alicia**, **WL**, Rachel, Laranjinha	Nadja: The holder must cancel the votes of two contestants → **Marcia**, **Shayan**.; Rachel: The holder must ban one nominee from competing in the Farmer challenge → **Tonzão**.
3	Cariúcha	Lucas	**Cariúcha**, **Yuri**, Radamés, Shayan	Lucas: The holder is immune this week and must choose another contestant to also receive immunity → **Rachel**.; Rachel: The holder must choose two contestants (**Simioni**, **Yuri**). A new vote decides which one is the fourth nominee.
3	Lucas	Lucas	**Cariúcha**, **Yuri**, Radamés, Shayan	Lucas: The holder is immune this week and must choose another contestant to also receive immunity → **Rachel**.; Rachel: The holder must choose two contestants (**Simioni**, **Yuri**). A new vote decides which one is the fourth nominee.
3	Yuri	Lucas	**Cariúcha**, **Yuri**, Radamés, Shayan	Lucas: The holder is immune this week and must choose another contestant to also receive immunity → **Rachel**.; Rachel: The holder must choose two contestants (**Simioni**, **Yuri**). A new vote decides which one is the fourth nominee.
4	Jenny	Radamés	**Jenny**, **Marcia**, ~~Rachel~~, Lucas	Henrique: The holder must choose two contestants (**Kally**, **Nadja**). The Farmer must choose which one is the first nominee.; Radamés: The holder must swap one nominee (except the Farmer's) for another contestant → **Black** for **André**.
4	Marcia	Radamés	**Jenny**, **Marcia**, ~~Rachel~~, Lucas	Henrique: The holder must choose two contestants (**Kally**, **Nadja**). The Farmer must choose which one is the first nominee.; Radamés: The holder must swap one nominee (except the Farmer's) for another contestant → **Black** for **André**.
4	Radamés	Radamés	**Jenny**, **Marcia**, ~~Rachel~~, Lucas	Henrique: The holder must choose two contestants (**Kally**, **Nadja**). The Farmer must choose which one is the first nominee.; Radamés: The holder must swap one nominee (except the Farmer's) for another contestant → **Black** for **André**.
5	Henrique	Tonzão	**Henrique**, **Simioni**, Lily, Black	Tonzão: The holder must choose between winning R$10.000 and receiving two extra votes or **handing over R$10.000 to whoever is voted by the House as the second nominee (Lucas)**.; Black: The holder is this week's third nominee. If he is already nominated, he must choose the replacement.
5	Simioni	Tonzão	**Henrique**, **Simioni**, Lily, Black	Tonzão: The holder must choose between winning R$10.000 and receiving two extra votes or **handing over R$10.000 to whoever is voted by the House as the second nominee (Lucas)**.; Black: The holder is this week's third nominee. If he is already nominated, he must choose the replacement.
5	Tonzão	Tonzão	**Henrique**, **Simioni**, Lily, Black	Tonzão: The holder must choose between winning R$10.000 and receiving two extra votes or **handing over R$10.000 to whoever is voted by the House as the second nominee (Lucas)**.; Black: The holder is this week's third nominee. If he is already nominated, he must choose the replacement.
6	Jenny	Sander	**Jenny**, **Marcia**, Black, Shayan	Sander: The holder must choose the fourth nominee (**Marcia**) and ban one nominee from competing in the Farmer challenge (**Nadja**).; Tonzão: The holder must cancel the votes of four contestants who in turn must nominate a different contestant, with the exception of the holder → **Alicia**, **Black**, **Jaquelline**, **Shayan**.
6	Marcia	Sander	**Jenny**, **Marcia**, Black, Shayan	Sander: The holder must choose the fourth nominee (**Marcia**) and ban one nominee from competing in the Farmer challenge (**Nadja**).; Tonzão: The holder must cancel the votes of four contestants who in turn must nominate a different contestant, with the exception of the holder → **Alicia**, **Black**, **Jaquelline**, **Shayan**.
6	Sander	Sander	**Jenny**, **Marcia**, Black, Shayan	Sander: The holder must choose the fourth nominee (**Marcia**) and ban one nominee from competing in the Farmer challenge (**Nadja**).; Tonzão: The holder must cancel the votes of four contestants who in turn must nominate a different contestant, with the exception of the holder → **Alicia**, **Black**, **Jaquelline**, **Shayan**.
7	Alicia	Alicia	**Jaquelline**, **Lily**, André, Yuri	Alicia: The holder must swap the nominee banned from the Farmer's challenge for another nominee → **Jaquelline** for **Lucas**.; Black: The holder must swap the second nominee (Nadja) for any other contestant from the main House → **Lucas**.
7	Jaquelline	Alicia	**Jaquelline**, **Lily**, André, Yuri	Alicia: The holder must swap the nominee banned from the Farmer's challenge for another nominee → **Jaquelline** for **Lucas**.; Black: The holder must swap the second nominee (Nadja) for any other contestant from the main House → **Lucas**.
7	Lily	Alicia	**Jaquelline**, **Lily**, André, Yuri	Alicia: The holder must swap the nominee banned from the Farmer's challenge for another nominee → **Jaquelline** for **Lucas**.; Black: The holder must swap the second nominee (Nadja) for any other contestant from the main House → **Lucas**.
8	Black	Black	**Sander**, **Shayan**, **WL**, Lucas	Black: The holder must choose between being immune or **nominate the third nominee among the Stall contestants → Lucas**.; Shayan: The Farmer wins R$20.000 if he transfer his nomination power to the holder → **offer refused**.
8	Sander	Black	**Sander**, **Shayan**, **WL**, Lucas	Black: The holder must choose between being immune or **nominate the third nominee among the Stall contestants → Lucas**.; Shayan: The Farmer wins R$20.000 if he transfer his nomination power to the holder → **offer refused**.
8	Shayan	Black	**Sander**, **Shayan**, **WL**, Lucas	Black: The holder must choose between being immune or **nominate the third nominee among the Stall contestants → Lucas**.; Shayan: The Farmer wins R$20.000 if he transfer his nomination power to the holder → **offer refused**.
8	WL	Black	**Sander**, **Shayan**, **WL**, Lucas	Black: The holder must choose between being immune or **nominate the third nominee among the Stall contestants → Lucas**.; Shayan: The Farmer wins R$20.000 if he transfer his nomination power to the holder → **offer refused**.
9	Alicia	Lily	**Alicia**, **Radamés**, André, Tonzão	Lily: The holder must swap the fourth nominee (Radamés) for another contestant that has not yet face the public vote → **Alicia**.; WL: The holder must choose contestant from the Stall to be eligible to be nominated by the contestants from the House → **Alicia**.
9	Lily	Lily	**Alicia**, **Radamés**, André, Tonzão	Lily: The holder must swap the fourth nominee (Radamés) for another contestant that has not yet face the public vote → **Alicia**.; WL: The holder must choose contestant from the Stall to be eligible to be nominated by the contestants from the House → **Alicia**.
9	Radamés	Lily	**Alicia**, **Radamés**, André, Tonzão	Lily: The holder must swap the fourth nominee (Radamés) for another contestant that has not yet face the public vote → **Alicia**.; WL: The holder must choose contestant from the Stall to be eligible to be nominated by the contestants from the House → **Alicia**.
10	Nadja	WL	**Nadja**, **Shayan**, André, Radamés	WL: The holder must start the "Save Chain" to determine the third and fourth nominees and ban one of the two from competing in the Farmer challenge → **Radamés**.; Yuri: The holder must multiply by two the total nominations received by a contestant → **Kally**.
10	Shayan	WL	**Nadja**, **Shayan**, André, Radamés	WL: The holder must start the "Save Chain" to determine the third and fourth nominees and ban one of the two from competing in the Farmer challenge → **Radamés**.; Yuri: The holder must multiply by two the total nominations received by a contestant → **Kally**.
10	WL	WL	**Nadja**, **Shayan**, André, Radamés	WL: The holder must start the "Save Chain" to determine the third and fourth nominees and ban one of the two from competing in the Farmer challenge → **Radamés**.; Yuri: The holder must multiply by two the total nominations received by a contestant → **Kally**.
11	Black	Radamés	**Black**, **Marcia**, Shayan, Yuri	Radamés: The holder must swap the third or fourth nominee for another contestant → **Radamés** for **Nadja**.; Shayan: The holder must choose a contestant to receive immunity from the House's vote → **Radamés**.
11	Marcia	Radamés	**Black**, **Marcia**, Shayan, Yuri	Radamés: The holder must swap the third or fourth nominee for another contestant → **Radamés** for **Nadja**.; Shayan: The holder must choose a contestant to receive immunity from the House's vote → **Radamés**.
11	Radamés	Radamés	**Black**, **Marcia**, Shayan, Yuri	Radamés: The holder must swap the third or fourth nominee for another contestant → **Radamés** for **Nadja**.; Shayan: The holder must choose a contestant to receive immunity from the House's vote → **Radamés**.
12	Lily	Shayan	~~**Lily**~~, **WL**, ~~Radamés~~, ~~Tonzão~~, André, Marcia, Nadja	Shayan: The holder must choose two contestants (**Lily**, **Tonzão**). A new vote decides which one is the fifth nominee.; Black: The holder must swap three contestants in the Stall for another three contestants in the House → **Lily**, **Radamés** & **Tonzão** for **André**, **Marcia** & **Nadja**.
12	Shayan	Shayan	~~**Lily**~~, **WL**, ~~Radamés~~, ~~Tonzão~~, André, Marcia, Nadja	Shayan: The holder must choose two contestants (**Lily**, **Tonzão**). A new vote decides which one is the fifth nominee.; Black: The holder must swap three contestants in the Stall for another three contestants in the House → **Lily**, **Radamés** & **Tonzão** for **André**, **Marcia** & **Nadja**.
12	WL	Shayan	~~**Lily**~~, **WL**, ~~Radamés~~, ~~Tonzão~~, André, Marcia, Nadja	Shayan: The holder must choose two contestants (**Lily**, **Tonzão**). A new vote decides which one is the fifth nominee.; Black: The holder must swap three contestants in the Stall for another three contestants in the House → **Lily**, **Radamés** & **Tonzão** for **André**, **Marcia** & **Nadja**.

=== Delegations ===
	Week 1	Week 2	Week 3	Week 4	Week 5	Week 6	Week 7	Week 8	Week 9	Week 10	Week 11	Week 12	Week 13	
	Week 1	Week 2	Week 3	Week 4	Week 5	Week 6	Week 7	Week 8	Week 9	Week 10	Week 11	Week 12	Day 89	Day 92
Farmer of the week	**Yuri**	**André**	**Jaquelline**	**Yuri**	**Jenny**	**Lucas**	**Shayan**	**Yuri**	**Jaquelline**	**Black**	**Tonzão**	**Jaquelline**	**André**	—N/a
Obligations
Cows Bull	Lucas; Henrique	Radamés; Shayan	Black; Jenny	André; Jaquelline	Alicia; Black	Jaquelline; Yuri	André; WL	Black; Lucas	WL; Yuri	Marcia; WL	Black; ~~Kally~~; Shayan	André; Radamés	Jaquelline; Shayan	Jaquelline; André
Horse	Jaquelline	Kally	Lucas	Alicia	Shayan	Nadja	Henrique	Radamés	Radamés	Radamés	Nadja	Nadja	~~Black~~; Nadja	WL
Goats	WL	Rachel	Marcia	WL	Kally	Alicia	Radamés	Kally	Shayan	André	Lily	~~Yuri~~; Tonzão	Marcia	Marcia
Sheep	Kally	Jaquelline	Kally	Lily	~~Rachel~~; WL	Sander	Lily	André	Nadja	Yuri	André	Shayan	Lily	Lily
Pigs	Nathalia	Nadja	Nadja	Simioni	Nadja	Marcia	Black	Lily	~~Lucas~~	Kally	Yuri	Marcia	Nadja	Marcia
Garden Plants	Marcia	Cariúcha	Henrique	Lucas	Jaquelline	André	Yuri	Nadja	Black	Jaquelline	WL	WL	WL	Lily
Birds	Tonzão	Lucas	Radamés	Black	Radamés	Radamés	Tonzão	WL	Alicia	~~Alicia~~; Nadja	Jaquelline	Lily	~~Radamés~~; Tonzão	Tonzão
Trash	Jenny	Laranjinha	Cariúcha	Rachel	Lucas	Tonzão	Jaquelline	Shayan	Lily	Tonzão	Marcia	Tonzão	WL	WL
Camera	Lily	Alicia	WL	Shayan	Henrique	Henrique	Alicia	Alicia	Kally	Lily	Radamés	Black	Tonzão	Tonzão
Farm's ranch
Farmer's guests	Laranjinha; Lily; Nathalia	Rachel; Radamés; Tonzão	Kally; Nadja; Rachel	Lily; Tonzão; WL	Lily; Simioni; WL	André; Jaquelline; Kally	Alicia; Black; Radamés	Sander; Tonzão; WL	André; Lucas; Marcia	Kally; Radamés; Shayan	Lily; WL; Yuri	André; Lily; Marcia	(none)	

=== Voting history ===
	Week 1		Week 2	Week 3	Week 4	Week 5	Week 6	Week 7	Week 8	Week 9	Week 10	Week 11	Week 12	Week 13		
	Day 2	Day 10	Week 2	Week 3	Week 4	Week 5	Week 6	Week 7	Week 8	Week 9	Week 10	Week 11	Week 12	Day 90	Day 93	Finale
Farmer of the week	(none)	Yuri	André	Jaquelline	Yuri	Jenny	Lucas	Shayan	Yuri	Jaquelline	Black	Tonzão	Jaquelline	André	(none)	(none)
Nomination (Farmer)	(none)	Rachel	Tonzão	Cariúcha	Kally	Kally	Jenny	Jaquelline	Jaquelline	Black	Tonzão	Black	Black	(none)	(none)	(none)
Nomination (House)	(none)	Lucas	Jaquelline	Marcia	~~Black~~; André	Lucas	Nadja	~~Nadja~~; Lucas	Marcia	Shayan	Kally	Jaquelline	Radamés	Shayan	(none)	(none)
Nomination (Stall)	(none)	Nathalia	Laranjinha	Shayan	Jenny	Black	Shayan	Yuri	Lucas	André	(none)	Yuri	WL	(none)	(none)	(none)
Nomination (Twist)	(none)	André	Sander	Yuri	Nadja	Simioni	Marcia	Henrique	Sander	~~Radamés~~; Alicia	Nadja; Radamés	~~Radamés~~; Nadja	André; Tonzão	Jaquelline; Nadja; WL; Marcia	All contestants	(none)
Jaquelline	Not eligible	Laranjinha	Black	Farmer of the week	Black	Tonzão	~~Tonzão~~; Lily	Tonzão	Black	Farmer of the week	Kally (x2)	Nadja	Farmer of the week	Tonzão	Nominee	**Winner** (Day 96)
André	Not eligible	Radamés	Farmer of the week	Alicia	Black	Tonzão	Alicia	Tonzão	Black	Shayan	Kally (x2)	Nadja	Radamés	Shayan	Nominee	**Runner-up** (Day 96)
André	Not eligible	Radamés	Farmer of the week	Yuri	Black	Tonzão	Alicia	Tonzão	Black	Shayan	Kally (x2)	Nadja	Tonzão	Shayan	Nominee	**Runner-up** (Day 96)
Marcia	Not eligible	Lucas	~~Jaquelline~~	Simioni	Black	Alicia	Alicia	Kally	Black	Shayan	Kally (x2)	André	Shayan	Lily	Nominee	**Third place** (Day 96)
Marcia	Not eligible	Lucas	~~Jaquelline~~	Simioni	Black	Alicia	Alicia	Kally	Black	Shayan	Kally (x2)	André	Tonzão	Lily	Nominee	**Third place** (Day 96)
WL	Not eligible	Lucas	Lucas	Nadja	Black	Lucas	Nadja	Nadja	Nadja	Shayan	Kally (x2)	Jaquelline	Radamés	Shayan	Nominee	**Fourth place** (Day 96)
WL	Not eligible	Lucas	Lucas	Simioni	Black	Lucas	Nadja	Nadja	Nadja	Shayan	Kally (x2)	Jaquelline	Tonzão	Shayan	Nominee	**Fourth place** (Day 96)
Tonzão	Not eligible	Lucas (x2)	Shayan	Alicia	Black	Lucas	Nadja	Nadja	Black	Shayan	Kally (x2)	Jaquelline	Radamés	Shayan	Nominee	Evicted (Day 94)
Tonzão	Not eligible	Lucas (x2)	Shayan	Simioni	Black	Lucas	Nadja	Nadja	Black	Shayan	Kally (x2)	Jaquelline	Nominee	Shayan	Nominee	Evicted (Day 94)
Lily	Not eligible	Lucas	Jaquelline	Nadja	Black	Jaquelline	Nadja	Nadja	Marcia	Shayan	Kally (x2)	Jaquelline	Radamés	Shayan	Nominee	Evicted (Day 94)
Lily	Not eligible	Lucas	Jaquelline	Simioni	Black	Jaquelline	Nadja	Nadja	Marcia	Shayan	Kally (x2)	Jaquelline	Nominee	Shayan	Nominee	Evicted (Day 94)
Nadja	Warehouse	Sander	Black	Alicia	Black	Alicia	Alicia	Tonzão	Lily	Jaquelline	Jaquelline	Jaquelline	Shayan	Tonzão	Evicted (Day 91)	
Nadja	Warehouse	Sander	Black	Yuri	Black	Alicia	Alicia	Tonzão	Lily	Jaquelline	Jaquelline	Jaquelline	Tonzão	Tonzão	Evicted (Day 91)	
Shayan	Warehouse	Kally	~~Jaquelline~~	Marcia	André	Nadja	~~Tonzão~~; André	Farmer of the week	Marcia	Jaquelline	Marcia	Lily	Lily	Tonzão	Evicted (Day 91)	
Shayan	Warehouse	Kally	~~Jaquelline~~	Yuri	André	Nadja	~~Tonzão~~; André	Farmer of the week	Marcia	Jaquelline	Marcia	Lily	Lily	Tonzão	Evicted (Day 91)	
Black	Warehouse	Lucas	Jaquelline	Marcia	Tonzão	Lucas	~~Tonzão~~; André	Lucas	Marcia	Jaquelline	Farmer of the week	Nadja	Lily	Evicted (Day 89)		
Black	Warehouse	Lucas	Jaquelline	Yuri	Tonzão	Lucas	~~Tonzão~~; André	Lucas	Marcia	Jaquelline	Farmer of the week	Nadja	Lily	Evicted (Day 89)		
Radamés	Not eligible	Lucas	Jaquelline	Nadja	André	Nadja	Nadja	Lucas	Marcia	Jaquelline	Jaquelline	Nadja	Lily	Evicted (Day 89)		
Radamés	Not eligible	Lucas	Jaquelline	Yuri	André	Nadja	Nadja	Lucas	Marcia	Jaquelline	Jaquelline	Nadja	Lily	Evicted (Day 89)		
Yuri	Not eligible	Farmer of the week	Jaquelline	Nadja	Farmer of the week	Lucas	Nadja	Nadja	Farmer of the week	Shayan	Kally (x2)	Jaquelline	Evicted (Day 82)			
Yuri	Not eligible	Farmer of the week	Jaquelline	Nominee	Farmer of the week	Lucas	Nadja	Nadja	Farmer of the week	Shayan	Kally (x2)	Jaquelline	Evicted (Day 82)			
Kally	Not eligible	Laranjinha	Sander	Marcia	Nadja	Tonzão	Tonzão	Marcia	Marcia	Jaquelline	Jaquelline	Evicted (Day 75)				
Kally	Not eligible	Laranjinha	Sander	Yuri	Nadja	Tonzão	Tonzão	Marcia	Marcia	Jaquelline	Jaquelline	Evicted (Day 75)				
Alicia	Warehouse	Lucas	Nadja	Marcia	André	Lucas	~~Tonzão~~; Nadja	Lucas	Marcia	Lily	Evicted (Day 68)					
Alicia	Warehouse	Lucas	Nadja	Yuri	André	Lucas	~~Tonzão~~; Nadja	Lucas	Marcia	Lily	Evicted (Day 68)					
Lucas	Not eligible	Laranjinha	Cariúcha	Tonzão	Black	Tonzão	Farmer of the week	Tonzão	Black	Shayan	Walked (Day 67)					
Lucas	Not eligible	Laranjinha	Cariúcha	Yuri	Black	Tonzão	Farmer of the week	Tonzão	Black	Shayan	Walked (Day 67)					
Sander	Not eligible	Lucas	Jaquelline	Marcia	Black	Lucas	Nadja	Nadja	Marcia	Evicted (Day 61)						
Sander	Not eligible	Lucas	Jaquelline	Yuri	Black	Lucas	Nadja	Nadja	Marcia	Evicted (Day 61)						
Henrique	Not eligible	Lucas	Jaquelline	Nadja	Nadja	Lucas	Nadja	Lucas	Evicted (Day 54)							
Henrique	Not eligible	Lucas	Jaquelline	Simioni	Nadja	Lucas	Nadja	Lucas	Evicted (Day 54)							
Jenny	Not eligible	Lucas	Jaquelline	Marcia	Black	Farmer of the week	Nadja	Evicted (Day 47)								
Jenny	Not eligible	Lucas	Jaquelline	Yuri	Black	Farmer of the week	Nadja	Evicted (Day 47)								
Simioni	Not eligible	Lucas (x2)	Jaquelline	Marcia	Black	Alicia	Evicted (Day 40)									
Simioni	Not eligible	Lucas (x2)	Jaquelline	Nominee	Black	Alicia	Evicted (Day 40)									
Rachel	Not eligible	Laranjinha	Cariúcha	Marcia	Nadja	Ejected (Day 33)										
Rachel	Not eligible	Laranjinha	Cariúcha	Simioni	Nadja	Ejected (Day 33)										
Cariúcha	Not eligible	Lucas	Jaquelline	Black	Evicted (Day 26)											
Cariúcha	Not eligible	Lucas	Jaquelline	Yuri	Evicted (Day 26)											
Laranjinha	Not eligible	Lucas	Jaquelline	Evicted (Day 19)												
Nathalia	Not eligible	Lucas	Evicted (Day 12)													
Igor	Warehouse	Evicted (Day 5)														
Whendy	Warehouse	Evicted (Day 5)														
Erick	Warehouse	Evicted (Day 5)														
Sol	Warehouse	Evicted (Day 5)														
Lumena	Warehouse	Evicted (Day 5)														
JP	Warehouse	Evicted (Day 5)														
Notes	1	2, 3, 4	5, 6	7, 8	9, 10, 11	12	13, 14	15, 16	17	18, 19, 20, 21	22, 23	24, 25	26, 27	28	29	30
Up for nomination	(none)	Rachel; Lucas; Nathalia; André	Tonzão; Jaquelline; Laranjinha; Sander	Cariúcha; Marcia; Shayan; Yuri	Kally; André; Jenny; Nadja	Kally; Lucas; Black; Simioni	Jenny; Nadja; Shayan; Marcia	Jaquelline; Lucas; Yuri; Henrique	Jaquelline; Marcia; Lucas; Sander	Black; Shayan; André; Alicia	Tonzão; Kally; Nadja; Radamés	Black; Jaquelline; Yuri; Nadja	Black; Radamés; WL; André; Tonzão	(none)		
Farmer winner	(none)	André	Jaquelline	Yuri	Jenny	Lucas	Shayan	Yuri	Jaquelline	Black	Tonzão	Jaquelline	André	(none)		
Nominated for eviction	Black; Erick; Igor; JP; Shayan	Lucas; Nathalia; Rachel	Laranjinha; Sander; Tonzão	Cariúcha; Marcia; Shayan	André; Kally; Nadja	Black; Kally; Simioni	Jenny; Marcia; Nadja	Henrique; Jaquelline; Lucas	Lucas; Marcia; Sander	Alicia; André; Shayan	Kally; Nadja; Radamés	Black; Nadja; Yuri	Black; Radamés; Tonzão; WL	Jaquelline; Marcia; Nadja; Shayan; WL	André; Jaquelline; Lily; Marcia; Tonzão; WL	André; Jaquelline; Marcia; WL
Nominated for eviction	Alicia; Lumena; Nadja; Sol; Whendy	Lucas; Nathalia; Rachel	Laranjinha; Sander; Tonzão	Cariúcha; Marcia; Shayan	André; Kally; Nadja	Black; Kally; Simioni	Jenny; Marcia; Nadja	Henrique; Jaquelline; Lucas	Lucas; Marcia; Sander	Alicia; André; Shayan	Kally; Nadja; Radamés	Black; Nadja; Yuri	Black; Radamés; Tonzão; WL	Jaquelline; Marcia; Nadja; Shayan; WL	André; Jaquelline; Lily; Marcia; Tonzão; WL	André; Jaquelline; Marcia; WL
Ejected	(none)				**Rachel**	(none)										
Walked	(none)									**Lucas**	(none)					
Evicted	**JP**; 5.43% to enter	**Nathalia**; 5.77% to save	**Laranjinha**; 4.43% to save	**Cariúcha**; 9.74% to save	~~**Nadja**~~; ~~23.67%~~; ~~to save~~	**Simioni**; 8.88% to save	**Jenny**; 8.52% to save	**Henrique**; 5.64% to save	**Sander**; 6.32% to save	**Alicia**; 4.62% to save	**Kally**; 9.68% to save	**Yuri**; 24.26% to save	**Radamés**; 9.63% to save	**Shayan**; 6.89% to save	**Lily**; 0.78% to save	**WL**; 5.28% to win
Evicted	**Erick**; 14.40% to enter	**Nathalia**; 5.77% to save	**Laranjinha**; 4.43% to save	**Cariúcha**; 9.74% to save	~~**Nadja**~~; ~~23.67%~~; ~~to save~~	**Simioni**; 8.88% to save	**Jenny**; 8.52% to save	**Henrique**; 5.64% to save	**Sander**; 6.32% to save	**Alicia**; 4.62% to save	**Kally**; 9.68% to save	**Yuri**; 24.26% to save	**Radamés**; 9.63% to save	**Shayan**; 6.89% to save	**Lily**; 0.78% to save	**WL**; 5.28% to win
Evicted	**Igor**; 18.02% to enter	**Nathalia**; 5.77% to save	**Laranjinha**; 4.43% to save	**Cariúcha**; 9.74% to save	~~**Nadja**~~; ~~23.67%~~; ~~to save~~	**Simioni**; 8.88% to save	**Jenny**; 8.52% to save	**Henrique**; 5.64% to save	**Sander**; 6.32% to save	**Alicia**; 4.62% to save	**Kally**; 9.68% to save	**Yuri**; 24.26% to save	**Radamés**; 9.63% to save	**Shayan**; 6.89% to save	**Lily**; 0.78% to save	**Marcia**; 12.78% to win
Evicted	**Lumena**; 8.99% to enter	**Nathalia**; 5.77% to save	**Laranjinha**; 4.43% to save	**Cariúcha**; 9.74% to save	~~**Nadja**~~; ~~23.67%~~; ~~to save~~	**Simioni**; 8.88% to save	**Jenny**; 8.52% to save	**Henrique**; 5.64% to save	**Sander**; 6.32% to save	**Alicia**; 4.62% to save	**Kally**; 9.68% to save	**Yuri**; 24.26% to save	**Black**; 14.87% to save	**Nadja**; 8.07% to save	**Tonzão**; 2.15% to save	**Marcia**; 12.78% to win
Evicted	**Sol**; 12.32% to enter	**Nathalia**; 5.77% to save	**Laranjinha**; 4.43% to save	**Cariúcha**; 9.74% to save	~~**Nadja**~~; ~~23.67%~~; ~~to save~~	**Simioni**; 8.88% to save	**Jenny**; 8.52% to save	**Henrique**; 5.64% to save	**Sander**; 6.32% to save	**Alicia**; 4.62% to save	**Kally**; 9.68% to save	**Yuri**; 24.26% to save	**Black**; 14.87% to save	**Nadja**; 8.07% to save	**Tonzão**; 2.15% to save	**André**; 25.77% to win
Evicted	**Whendy**; 17.42% to enter	**Nathalia**; 5.77% to save	**Laranjinha**; 4.43% to save	**Cariúcha**; 9.74% to save	~~**Nadja**~~; ~~23.67%~~; ~~to save~~	**Simioni**; 8.88% to save	**Jenny**; 8.52% to save	**Henrique**; 5.64% to save	**Sander**; 6.32% to save	**Alicia**; 4.62% to save	**Kally**; 9.68% to save	**Yuri**; 24.26% to save	**Black**; 14.87% to save	**Nadja**; 8.07% to save	**Tonzão**; 2.15% to save	**André**; 25.77% to win
Survived	**Black**; 22.88% to enter	**Rachel**; 43.57% to save	**Tonzão**; 47.58% to save	**Marcia**; 35.75% to save	~~**André**~~; ~~36.00%~~; ~~to save~~	**Black**; 42.35% to save	**Márcia**; 37.20% to save	**Jaquelline**; 41.99% to save	**Marcia**; 45.01% to save	**Shayan**; 23.03% to save	**Radamés**; 44.95% to save	**Nadja**; 27.96% to save	**Tonzão**; 34.07% to save	**WL**; 9.54% to save	**WL**; 5.47% to save	**Jaquelline**; 56.17% to win
Survived	**Shayan**; 39.27% to enter	**Rachel**; 43.57% to save	**Tonzão**; 47.58% to save	**Marcia**; 35.75% to save	~~**André**~~; ~~36.00%~~; ~~to save~~	**Black**; 42.35% to save	**Márcia**; 37.20% to save	**Jaquelline**; 41.99% to save	**Marcia**; 45.01% to save	**Shayan**; 23.03% to save	**Radamés**; 44.95% to save	**Nadja**; 27.96% to save	**Tonzão**; 34.07% to save	**WL**; 9.54% to save	**Marcia**; 13.32% to save	**Jaquelline**; 56.17% to win
Survived	**Shayan**; 39.27% to enter	**Rachel**; 43.57% to save	**Tonzão**; 47.58% to save	**Marcia**; 35.75% to save	~~**André**~~; ~~36.00%~~; ~~to save~~	**Black**; 42.35% to save	**Márcia**; 37.20% to save	**Jaquelline**; 41.99% to save	**Marcia**; 45.01% to save	**Shayan**; 23.03% to save	**Radamés**; 44.95% to save	**Nadja**; 27.96% to save	**Tonzão**; 34.07% to save	**Marcia**; 10.18% to save	**Marcia**; 13.32% to save	**Jaquelline**; 56.17% to win
Survived	**Alicia**; 27.01% to enter	**Lucas**; 50.66% to save	**Sander**; 47.99% to save	**Shayan**; 54.51% to save	~~**Kally**~~; ~~40.33%~~; ~~to save~~	**Kally**; 48.77% to save	**Nadja**; 54.28% to save	**Lucas**; 52.37% to save	**Lucas**; 48.67% to save	**André**; 72.35% to save	**Nadja**; 45.37% to save	**Black**; 47.78% to save	**WL**; 41.43% to save	**Marcia**; 10.18% to save	**André**; 23.80% to save	**Jaquelline**; 56.17% to win
Survived	**Alicia**; 27.01% to enter	**Lucas**; 50.66% to save	**Sander**; 47.99% to save	**Shayan**; 54.51% to save	~~**Kally**~~; ~~40.33%~~; ~~to save~~	**Kally**; 48.77% to save	**Nadja**; 54.28% to save	**Lucas**; 52.37% to save	**Lucas**; 48.67% to save	**André**; 72.35% to save	**Nadja**; 45.37% to save	**Black**; 47.78% to save	**WL**; 41.43% to save	**Jaquelline**; 65.32% to save	**André**; 23.80% to save	**Jaquelline**; 56.17% to win
Survived	**Nadja**; 34.26% to enter	**Lucas**; 50.66% to save	**Sander**; 47.99% to save	**Shayan**; 54.51% to save	~~**Kally**~~; ~~40.33%~~; ~~to save~~	**Kally**; 48.77% to save	**Nadja**; 54.28% to save	**Lucas**; 52.37% to save	**Lucas**; 48.67% to save	**André**; 72.35% to save	**Nadja**; 45.37% to save	**Black**; 47.78% to save	**WL**; 41.43% to save	**Jaquelline**; 65.32% to save	**Jaquelline**; 54.48% to save	**Jaquelline**; 56.17% to win

==== Notes ====
- **^Note 1**: Alicia, Black, Erick, Igor, JP, Lumena, Nadja, Shayan, Sol and Whendy entered the Warehouse live on day 2. After entering, public vote began for four of them (two men, two women) to enter in the game. Shayan and Black won the men’s , while Nadja and Alicia won the women’s vote. The four moved into the main House on day 5.
- **^Note 2**: On day 5, the four selected contestants from the Warehouse competed in special challenge, where they had to challenge a contestant from the main House in a duel for immunity. Black, Shayan and Alicia won their duels against Kally, Lily and Jenny respectively, thus won immunity and R$10.000 each. Nadja lost her duel against Cariúcha, so Cariúcha won immunity and R$10.000 herself.
- **^Note 3**: Tonzão's and Simioni's votes on Lucas counted as two by Tonzão due to the use of his Orange flame power, increasing Lucas' nominations total to 16.
- **^Note 4**: As the third nominee, Nathalia had to start the Save Chain in order to determine the fourth nominee. She saved Lily, who saved Laranjinha, who saved WL, who saved Tonzão, who saved Sander, who saved Simioni, who saved Jenny, who saved Radamés, who saved Marcia, who saved Henrique, who saved Nadja, who saved Jaquelline, who saved Kally, leaving André nominated. He was then asked to ban one of the other three nominees from competing in the Farmer challenge, thus going straight to the public vote. He chose Nathalia.
- **^Note 5**: Marcia's and Shayan's votes on Jaquelline were cancelled by Nadja due to the use of her White flame power, decreasing Jaquelline's nominations total to 10.
- **^Note 6**: As the third nominee, Laranjinha had to start the Save Chain in order to determine the fourth nominee. He saved Lily, who saved WL, who saved Yuri, who saved Henrique, who saved Marcia, who saved Radamés, who saved Shayan, who saved Alicia, who saved Black, who saved Simioni, who saved Cariúcha, who saved Jenny, who saved Nadja, who saved Kally, who saved Rachel, who saved Lucas, leaving Sander nominated. Orange flame power holder Rachel had to ban one of the four nominees from competing in the Farmer challenge, thus going straight to the public vote. She chose Tonzão.
- **^Note 7**: Lucas won immunity for the nominations on week 3 due to the use of his White flame power. In addition, he had to choose another contestant to also receive immunity. He chose Rachel.
- **^Note 8**: Orange flame power holder Rachel had to choose the two contestants who would be eligible to become the fourth nominee through a surprise House vote. She chose Simioni and Yuri. Yuri ended up being nominated by a 11–6 vote over Simioni. He was then asked to ban one of the other three nominees from competing in the Farmer challenge, thus going straight to the public vote. He chose Shayan.
- **^Note 9**: As the third nominee, Jenny had to start the Save Chain in order to determine the fourth nominee. She saved Simioni, who saved Lily, who saved Tonzão, who saved WL, who saved Sander, who saved Marcia, who saved Radamés, who saved Henrique, who saved Shayan, who saved Alicia, who saved Rachel, who saved André, who saved Lucas, who saved Jaquelline, leaving Nadja nominated. She was then asked to ban one of the other three nominees from competing in the Farmer challenge, thus going straight to the public vote. She chose André.
- **^Note 10**: Orange flame power holder Radamés was asked to save one nominee (except the Farmer's) and choose a contestant from the main House to replace them. He chose to save Black and replaced him with André.
- **^Note 11**: On day 33, Rachel was ejected due to violent behaviour towards Jenny. As result, the ongoing public vote was suspended in the afternoon and this week's regular eviction was cancelled. After the season finale, the full results of the public vote were released, revealing that Nadja would have been evicted if the eviction had taken place.
- **^Note 12**: Black automatically became the third nominee after Fire challenge winner Tonzão handle him the Orange flame power. As result, he had to start the Save Chain in order to determine the fourth nominee. He saved André, who saved Jaquelline, who saved Alicia, who saved Shayan, who saved Radamés, who saved Henrique, who saved Marcia, who saved Nadja, who saved Sander, who saved Tonzão, who saved Lily, who saved WL, who saved Yuri, leaving Simioni nominated. She was then asked to ban one of the other three nominees from competing in the Farmer challenge, thus going straight to the public vote. She chose Black.
- **^Note 13**: Alicia, Black, Jaquelline and Shayan's original nominations on Tonzão were all cancelled due to the use of Tonzão's Orange flame power on them. As result, they had to revote in another eligible contestant besides him.
- **^Note 14**: White flame power holder Sander chose Marcia to be the fourth nominee. Sander was then asked to ban one of the other three nominees from competing in the Farmer challenge, thus going straight to the public vote. He chose Nadja.
- **^Note 15**: Orange flame power holder Black was asked to replace the second nominee (Nadja) with another contestant from the main House. He chose Lucas.
- **^Note 16**: As the third nominee, Yuri had to start the Save Chain in order to determine the fourth nominee. He saved Lily, who saved WL, who saved Sander, who saved Tonzão, who saved Marcia, who saved André, who saved Lucas, who saved Kally, who saved Alicia, who saved Black, who saved Radamés, leaving Henrique nominated. He was then asked to ban one of the other three nominees from competing in the Farmer challenge, thus going straight to the public vote. He chose Jaquelline. However, as White flame power holder, Alicia chose to veto Lucas instead.
- **^Note 17**: White flame power holder Black chose Lucas to be the third nominee. As result, he had to start the Save Chain in order to determine the fourth nominee. He saved André, who saved Nadja, who saved Kally, who saved Alicia, who saved Radamés, who saved Black, who saved Shayan, who saved WL, who saved Lily, who saved Tonzão, leaving Sander nominated. He was then asked to ban one of the other three nominees from competing in the Farmer challenge, thus going straight to the public vote. He chose Marcia.
- **^Note 18**: Orange flame power holder WL had choose a contestant from the Stall (either Alicia, Radamés, André or Tonzão) to be eligible to be nominated during the main House vote. He chose Alicia.
- **^Note 19**: As the third nominee, André had to start the Save Chain in order to determine the fourth nominee. He saved Jaquelline, who saved Lucas, who saved Marcia, who saved Tonzão, who saved Yuri, who saved Lily, who saved WL, who saved Nadja, who saved Kally, who saved Alicia, leaving Radamés nominated. He was then asked to ban one of the other three nominees from competing in the Farmer challenge, thus going straight to the public vote. He chose André.
- **^Note 20**: White flame power holder Lily was asked to replace the fourth nominee (Radamés) with another contestant from either the main House or the Stall that has not yet faced the public vote (Alicia, WL or Yuri). She chose Alicia.
- **^Note 21**: On day 67, Lucas walked from the game claiming that he was psychologically shaken after constant arguments with other contestants involving matters in and outside of the game.
- **^Note 22**: Orange flame power holder Yuri chose to multiply by two all 7 votes Kally received, increasing her nominations total to 14.
- **^Note 23**: As the White flame power holder, WL had to start the Save Chain in order to determine the third and fourth nominees. He saved Yuri, who saved Lily, who saved Marcia, who saved André, who saved Jaquelline, who saved Shayan, leaving both Nadja and Radamés nominated. WL was then asked to ban either Nadja or Radamés from competing in the Farmer challenge, thus going straight to the public vote. He chose Radamés.
- **^Note 24**: As the third nominee, Yuri had to start the Save Chain in order to determine the fourth nominee. He saved WL, who saved Lily, who saved André, who saved Marcia, who saved Nadja, who saved Shayan, leaving Radamés nominated. He was then asked to ban one of the other three nominees from competing in the Farmer challenge, thus going straight to the public vote. He chose Yuri.
- **^Note 25**: White flame power holder Radamés had swap the third or fourth nominee for another contestant. He chose to save himself and replaced with Nadja.
- **^Note 26**: For the first time this season, this week featured a double eviction. As the third nominee, WL had to start the Save Chain in order to determine the fourth nominee. He saved Lily, who saved Tonzão, who saved Shayan, who saved Nadja, who saved Marcia, leaving André nominated. He was then asked to ban one of the other three nominees from competing in the Farmer challenge, thus going straight to the public vote. He chose Black.
- **^Note 27**: White flame power holder Shayan had to choose the two contestants who would be eligible to become the fourth nominee through a surprise House vote. He chose Lily and Tonzão. Tonzão ended up being nominated by a 4–3 vote over Lily. He was then asked to ban one of the other three nominees from competing in the Farmer challenge, thus going straight to the public vote. He chose Radamés.
- **^Note 28**: On Day 90, the final eight contestants compete in duels with the 4 losers being automatically nominated for another double eviction. The winners were offered a chance to win R$30.000, but whoever accepts is nominated and swaps places with their opponent who lost the duel. Additionally, all contestants voted to determine the fifth nominee among the duel winners.
- **^Note 29**: From this point on, the public votes to decide who is evicted and ultimately wins. Following Shayan and Nadja's evictions on day 91, the final six contestants were automatically nominated for the final double eviction of the season with public vote opening on day 93.
- **^Note 30**: For the final, the public votes for the contestant they want to win A Fazenda 15.

== Ratings and reception ==
=== Brazilian ratings ===
All numbers are in points and provided by Kantar Ibope Media.

Week	First air date	Last air date	Timeslot (BRT)	Daily SP viewers (in points)							SP viewers (in points)	BR viewers (in points)	Ref.
Week	First air date	Last air date	Timeslot (BRT)	Mon	Tue	Wed	Thu	Fri	Sat	Sun	SP viewers (in points)	BR viewers (in points)	Ref.
1	19 September 2023	24 September 2023	Monday to Saturday; 10:30 p.m. Sunday; 11:00 p.m.	—	5.3	6.4	5.7	5.9	5.0	5.3	5.6	5.1	
2	25 September 2023	1 October 2023	Monday to Saturday; 10:30 p.m. Sunday; 11:00 p.m.	6.0	5.8	7.1	6.4	6.4	4.7	5.7	6.0	5.2	
3	2 October 2023	8 October 2023	Monday to Saturday; 10:30 p.m. Sunday; 11:00 p.m.	6.0	5.8	6.7	5.4	5.4	4.4	4.6	5.5	5.0	
4	9 October 2023	15 October 2023	Monday to Saturday; 10:30 p.m. Sunday; 11:00 p.m.	6.4	6.6	6.7	6.1	5.6	4.6	5.0	5.9	5.2	
5	16 October 2023	22 October 2023	Monday to Saturday; 10:30 p.m. Sunday; 11:00 p.m.	5.8	6.3	6.8	7.7	4.9	5.1	6.4	6.2	5.4	
6	23 October 2023	29 October 2023	Monday to Saturday; 10:30 p.m. Sunday; 11:00 p.m.	5.3	6.4	6.9	6.3	5.5	4.6	5.9	5.8	5.1	
7	30 October 2023	5 November 2023	Monday to Saturday; 10:30 p.m. Sunday; 11:00 p.m.	6.2	6.0	6.0	6.1	4.1	3.7	5.2	5.3	4.9	
8	6 November 2023	12 November 2023	Monday to Saturday; 10:30 p.m. Sunday; 11:00 p.m.	5.7	6.8	6.0	6.1	5.0	4.7	6.0	5.8	5.1	
9	13 November 2023	19 November 2023	Monday to Saturday; 10:30 p.m. Sunday; 11:00 p.m.	6.1	5.7	6.2	6.4	5.4	5.0	5.0	5.9	5.1	
10	20 November 2023	26 November 2023	Monday to Saturday; 10:30 p.m. Sunday; 11:00 p.m.	5.6	6.8	7.2	6.8	5.9	5.2	6.7	6.3	5.8	
11	27 November 2023	3 December 2023	Monday to Saturday; 10:30 p.m. Sunday; 11:00 p.m.	6.6	7.1	7.0	7.4	6.6	5.3	6.2	6.6	5.9	
12	4 December 2023	10 December 2023	Monday to Saturday; 10:30 p.m. Sunday; 11:00 p.m.	6.8	7.9	6.6	7.3	6.4	4.7	5.5	6.4	5.8	
13	11 December 2023	17 December 2023	Monday to Saturday; 10:30 p.m. Sunday; 11:00 p.m.	5.6	7.1	6.9	7.2	6.5	5.6	6.7	6.5	5.6	
14	18 December 2023	21 December 2023	Monday to Saturday; 10:30 p.m. Sunday; 11:00 p.m.	6.9	7.2	6.6	8.5	—	—	—	7.3	6.5	

- In 2023, each point represents 268.083 households in 15 market cities in Brazil (76.953 households in São Paulo).
