= Big Brother 16 =

Big Brother 16 is the sixteenth season of various versions of Big Brother and may refer to:

- Big Brother 16 (U.S.), the 2014 edition of the U.S. version
- Big Brother 16 (UK), the 2015 edition of the UK version
- Gran Hermano 16, the 2015 edition of the Spanish version
- Big Brother Brasil 16, the 2016 edition of the Brazilian version
- Bigg Boss 16, sixteenth season of Big Brother in India in Hindi

== See also ==
- Big Brother (franchise)
- Big Brother (disambiguation)
