= De Férias com o Ex Diretoria =

- Genre: Reality
- Created by: MTV International
- Based on: Ex on the Beach
- Presented by: André Coelho; Anna Clara Maia; Gabi Prado
- Narrated by: Allan Arnold
- Country of origin: Brazil
- Original language: Portuguese
- No. of seasons: 2
- No. of episodes: 26

Production
- Production companies: Floresta Produções; MTV Entertainment Studios

Original release
- Network: MTV Brazil
- Release: June 6 – August 22, 2024
- Network: Paramount+
- Release: June 6, 2024 – present

Related
- De Férias com o Ex; De Férias com o Ex Caribe

De Férias com o Ex: Diretoria (English: Ex on the Beach Brazil: The Elite) is a Brazilian reality television series created by Paramount Global and produced and aired by MTV and Paramount+. The series premiered on June 6, 2024. It is the third Brazilian adaptation of the original British series Ex on the Beach.

In August 2025, the start of production for the second season was confirmed.

== Format ==
Unlike previous Brazilian series of the franchise, Diretoria features a R$100,000 cash prize. At the end of the season, the cast member voted the best "ex" of the season wins the prize and is named the season's CEO.

The original cast consists exclusively of former participants from De Férias com o Ex, De Férias com o Ex: Celebs and De Férias com o Ex: Caribe.

== Season overview ==
Season	Location	Episodes	Originally released	
Season	Location	Episodes	First released	Last released
1	Maragogi	13	June 6, 2024	August 22, 2024
2	Pipa Beach	13	May 28, 2026	August 13, 2026
