= Barra Longa =

Brazilian municipality located in the state of Minas Gerais

Coordinates: 20°17′S 43°03′W

- Municipality
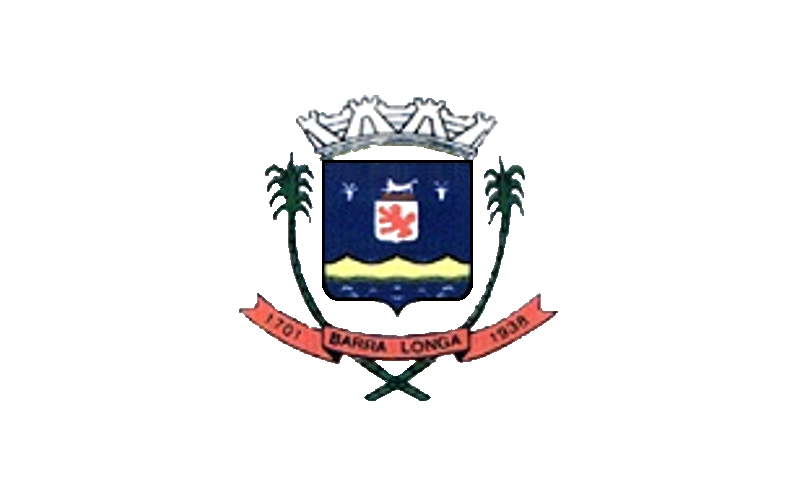
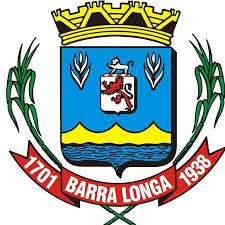
- Flag Coat of arms
- Interactive map of Barra Longa
- Country: Brazil
- State: Minas Gerais
- Region: Southeast
- Time zone: UTC−3 (BRT)

Location of Barra Longa within Minas Gerais

Barra Longa is a Brazilian municipality located in the state of Minas Gerais. Its population as of 2020 is estimated to be 5,015 people living in a total area of 386.101 km^{2}. The city belongs to the mesoregion of Zona da Mata and to the microregion of Ponte Nova.

== See also ==
- List of municipalities in Minas Gerais
