= A Fazenda 10 =

Season of television series

- Season 10
- Hosted by: Marcos Mion
- No. of days: 87
- No. of contestants: 16
- Winner: Rafael Ilha
- Runner-up: João Zoli
- Companion show: A Fazenda Online
- No. of episodes: 84

Release
- Original network: RecordTV
- Original release: September 18 – December 13, 2018

Season chronology
- ← Previous; A Fazenda 9 Next → A Fazenda 11

A Fazenda 10 (Note: also taglined as A Fazenda 10: Mais Conectada, stylized A Fazenda 10: + Conectada (English: The Farm 10: More Connected)) was the tenth season of the Brazilian reality television series A Fazenda, which premiered on Tuesday, September 18, 2018, on RecordTV. It was hosted by Marcos Mion (replacing Roberto Justus, who left the show after two seasons). The winner of the previous season, Flávia Viana, was the reporter of the season.

Marcos Mion replaced Roberto Justus as the main host, while season 9 winner Flávia Viana makes her debut as the show's new reporter.

On December 13, 2018, 43-year-old singer Rafael Ilha won the competition with 62.51% of the public vote over singer & actor João Zoli (35.77%) and personal trainer Caíque Aguiar (1.72%).

== Contestants ==
Biographical information according to Record official series site, plus footnoted additions.
(ages stated are at time of contest)

Contestant	Age	Background	Hometown	Week 1 team	Merged team	Status	Finish
Vida Vlatt	59	Actress & writer	São Paulo	Earth		Eliminated 1st on September 27, 2018	16th
Sandro Pedroso	34	Actor	Ponta Grossa	Earth		Eliminated 2nd on October 4, 2018	15th
Ana Paula Renault	36	Journalist	Belo Horizonte	Water		Eliminated 3rd on October 11, 2018	14th
Perlla	29	Singer	Nilópolis	Water		Eliminated 4th on October 18, 2018	13th
Aloísio Chulapa	43	Former football player	Atalaia	Earth		Eliminated 5th on October 25, 2018	12th
Gabi Prado	31	Digital influencer	Brasília	Water		Eliminated 6th on November 1, 2018	11th
Nadja Pessoa	30	Businesswoman	Recife	Water		Ejected on November 6, 2018	10th
Fernanda Lacerda	30	Former Panicat	São Bernardo	Water		Eliminated 7th on November 8, 2018	9th
Luane Dias	24	YouTuber	Nova Iguaçu	Water		Eliminated 8th on November 15, 2018	8th
Léo Stronda	26	Businessman	Rio de Janeiro	Water	Final Seven	Eliminated 9th on November 22, 2018	7th
Cátia Paganote	42	Former Paquita	Brasília	Earth	Final Seven	Ejected on November 29, 2018	6th
Felipe Sertanejo	30	Mixed martial artist	São Paulo	Earth	Final Seven	Eliminated 10th on December 4, 2018	5th
Evandro Santo	43	Comedian	Belo Horizonte	Earth	Final Seven	Eliminated 11th on December 10, 2018	4th
Caique Aguiar	24	Personal trainer	São Paulo	Water	Final Seven	Third place on December 13, 2018	3rd
João Zoli	26	Singer & actor	Niterói	Earth	Final Seven	Runner-up on December 13, 2018	2nd
Rafael Ilha	43	Singer	Rio de Janeiro	Earth	Final Seven	Winner on December 13, 2018	1st

== Future Appearances ==
After this season, in 2019, Cátia Paganote appeared in Dancing Brasil 5, she placed 6th in the competition.

In 2021, Nadja Pessoa appeared in Ilha Record 1, she finished in 6th place in the competition. In 2023, Nadja also appeared in A Fazenda 15, she finished in 7th place in the competition.

In 2022, Caique Aguiar appeared in Ilha Record 2, he finished in 8th place in the competition.

In 2023, João Zoli appeared on De Férias com o Ex Caribe: Salseiro VIP 2 as original cast member.

In 2024, Cátia Paganote appeared on A Grande Conquista 2, she have to compete for a place to enter in the game, Cátia won her place in the mansion and finished the game in 16th place.

In 2026, Ana Paula Renault broke the taboo of former "A Fazenda" contestants appearing on Big Brother Brasil by being part of the Veterans Group on Big Brother Brasil 26 and finished the game in 1st place.

== The game ==
=== Fire challenge ===
This season, contestants compete in the Fire challenge to win the Lamp power. The Lamp power entitles the holder the two flames (red and blue) which may unleash good or bad consequences on the nomination process, with the red flame power defined by the public through of R7.com among two options.

The winner chooses a flame for himself and delegates which contestant holds the other. The Flame holder's choice is marked in bold.

Results

Week	Players	Winner	Sent to the Stall	Consequences	
Week	Players	Winner	Sent to the Stall	Flame holder	Flame holder's choice
1	Léo	Cátia	**Léo**, Felipe, João	Cátia: This Flame's holder must give an immunity to someone. →**João**.	Léo: This Flame's holder must cancel four votes cast. →**Aloísio**, **Cátia**, **Felipe**, **Fernanda**.
1	Cátia	Cátia	**Léo**, Felipe, João	Cátia: This Flame's holder must give an immunity to someone. →**João**.	Léo: This Flame's holder must cancel four votes cast. →**Aloísio**, **Cátia**, **Felipe**, **Fernanda**.
2	Caique	Caique	**Felipe**, Aloísio, Cátia	Caique: This Flame's holder must choose between immunity from the Farmer's vote or the House vote. →**House vote**.	Fernanda: This Flame's holder must ban two contestants (one from each team) to take part in the next Fire challenge. →**João**, **Perlla**.
2	Felipe	Caique	**Felipe**, Aloísio, Cátia	Caique: This Flame's holder must choose between immunity from the Farmer's vote or the House vote. →**House vote**.	Fernanda: This Flame's holder must ban two contestants (one from each team) to take part in the next Fire challenge. →**João**, **Perlla**.
3	Gabi	Rafael	**Gabi**, Evandro, João	Rafael: This Flame's holder must choose the third nominee among the members of the stall. →**Evandro**	Cátia: The house votes were nullified, then the second nominee was decided by a dynamic. This Flame's holder started the dynamic by saving a contestant to be nominated and so on.
3	Rafael	Rafael	**Gabi**, Evandro, João	Rafael: This Flame's holder must choose the third nominee among the members of the stall. →**Evandro**	Cátia: The house votes were nullified, then the second nominee was decided by a dynamic. This Flame's holder started the dynamic by saving a contestant to be nominated and so on.
4	Caíque	João	**Caíque**, Fernanda, Luane, Felipe (by the Red Flame)	João: This Flame's holder must choose between win immunity or R$20.000. →**R$20.000**	Felipe: This Flame's holder is the fourth member of the stall. So, he/she can be nominated by the second nominee.
4	João	João	**Caíque**, Fernanda, Luane, Felipe (by the Red Flame)	João: This Flame's holder must choose between win immunity or R$20.000. →**R$20.000**	Felipe: This Flame's holder is the fourth member of the stall. So, he/she can be nominated by the second nominee.
5	Fernanda	Felipe	**Fernanda**, Aloísio, Caique	Felipe: This Flame's holder is immune from the Farmer's vote.	Nadja: Each house vote this flame's holder receives will count as double vote (x2).
5	Felipe	Felipe	**Fernanda**, Aloísio, Caique	Felipe: This Flame's holder is immune from the Farmer's vote.	Nadja: Each house vote this flame's holder receives will count as double vote (x2).
6	Léo	João	**Léo**, Cátia, Nadja	João: This Flame's holder must choose one of the nominees to have an advantage in the next Farmer of the Week's challenge. →**Gabi**.	Caique: This flame's holder must vote for a member of both Water and Earth team. →**Evandro**, **Luane**.
6	João	João	**Léo**, Cátia, Nadja	João: This Flame's holder must choose one of the nominees to have an advantage in the next Farmer of the Week's challenge. →**Gabi**.	Caique: This flame's holder must vote for a member of both Water and Earth team. →**Evandro**, **Luane**.
7	Caique	Caique	**Rafael**, Léo, Luane	Caique:	Fernanda:
7	Rafael	Caique	**Rafael**, Léo, Luane	Caique:	Fernanda:
8	Luane	Felipe	**Luane**, Caique, Léo	Felipe:	Luane:
8	Felipe	Felipe	**Luane**, Caique, Léo	Felipe:	Luane:
9	Earth; Team	Felipe	(none)	Felipe:	João:
10	Caique	Caique	(none)	Caique:	Cátia:
10	Felipe	Caique	(none)	Caique:	Cátia:
11	Evandro	Rafael	(none)	Rafael:	(none)
11	Rafael	Rafael	(none)	Rafael:	(none)

== Voting history ==
	Week 1	Week 2	Week 3	Week 4	Week 5	Week 6	Week 7	Week 8	Week 9	Week 10	Week 11	Week 12	Week 13	Nominations received
Farmer of the Week	Sandro	Léo	Felipe	Evandro	Luane	Rafael	Cátia	Rafael	Caique	João	Caique	(none)		
Nominated (Farmer)	Luane	Sandro	Nadja	Perlla	Rafael	Gabi	Léo	Luane	João	Evandro	João	(none)		
Nominated (House)	Vida	Nadja	~~Ana Paula~~	Rafael	Nadja	Evandro	Fernanda	Cátia	Rafael	Cátia	Felipe	(none)		
Nominated (Twist)	Léo	Felipe	Ana Paula; Evandro	Luane	Aloísio	Cátia	Rafael	Caique	Léo	Caique	(none)	(none)		
Rafael	Fernanda	Nadja	~~Ana Paula~~	Nadja	Cátia	Farmer of the Week	Fernanda	Farmer of the Week	Léo	Cátia	Felipe	Nominee	Winner (Day 87)	20
João	Nadja	Nadja	~~Ana Paula~~	Nadja	Nadja (x2)	Evandro	Fernanda	Cátia	Rafael	Farmer of the Week	Evandro	Nominee	Runner-Up (Day 87)	4
Caique	Aloísio	Rafael	~~Ana Paula~~	Rafael	Cátia	Evandro; Luane	Evandro	João	Farmer of the Week	Cátia; Rafael	Felipe	Saved	Third Place (Day 87)	1
Evandro	Ana Paula	Nadja	~~Ana Paula~~	Farmer of the Week	Cátia	Fernanda	Fernanda	Cátia	Léo	Caique	Felipe	Nominee	Evicted (Day 84)	15
Felipe	~~Nadja~~	Nadja	Farmer of the Week	Nadja	Nadja (x2)	Fernanda	Fernanda	Evandro	Rafael	Cátia	Evandro	Evicted (Day 78)		4
Cátia	~~Fernanda~~	Nadja	~~Ana Paula~~	Rafael	Nadja (x2)	Fernanda	Farmer of the Week	Evandro	Evandro	Rafael	Ejected (Day 73)			11
Léo	Nadja	Farmer of the Week	~~Ana Paula~~	Rafael	Nadja (x2)	Evandro	Evandro	Cátia	Rafael	Evicted (Day 66)				4
Luane	Vida	Rafael	~~Ana Paula~~	Rafael	Farmer of the Week	Evandro	Felipe	Cátia	Evicted (Day 59)					2
Fernanda	~~Cátia~~	Rafael	~~Ana Paula~~	Rafael	Cátia	Evandro	Evandro	Evicted (Day 52)						9
Nadja	Vida	Rafael	~~Aloísio~~	Rafael	Léo	João	Fernanda	Ejected (Day 50)						27
Gabi	Vida	Rafael	~~Rafael~~	Rafael	Nadja (x2)	Evandro	Evicted (Day 45)							2
Aloísio	~~Caique~~	Nadja	~~Ana Paula~~	Rafael	Nadja (x2)	Evicted (Day 38)								1
Perlla	Vida	Nadja	~~Ana Paula~~	Rafael	Evicted (Day 31)									1
Ana Paula	Vida	Nadja	~~Fernanda~~	Evicted (Day 24)										1
Sandro	Farmer of the Week	Nadja	Evicted (Day 17)											1
Vida	Gabi	Evicted (Day 10)												5
Notes	1, 2	3, 4	5, 6	7	8, 9	10, 11	12			13				
Up for nomination	Léo; Luane; Vida	Felipe; Nadja; Sandro	Ana Paula; Evandro; Nadja	Luane; Perlla; Rafael	Aloísio; Nadja; Rafael	Cátia; Evandro; Gabi	Fernanda; Léo; Rafael	Caique; Cátia; Luane	João; Léo; Rafael	Caique; Cátia; Evandro	(none)			
Saved	Léo	Felipe	Evandro	Luane	Rafael	Cátia	Rafael	Caique	João	Caique	(none)			
Nominated for eviction	Luane; Vida	Nadja; Sandro	Ana Paula; Nadja	Perlla; Rafael	Aloísio; Nadja	Evandro; Gabi	Fernanda; Léo	Cátia; Luane	Léo; Rafael	Cátia; Evandro	Felipe; João	Evandro; João; Rafael	Caique; João; Rafael	
Ejected	(none)						Nadja	(none)		Cátia	(none)			
Evicted	Vida; 46.84% to save	Sandro; 32.90% to save	Ana Paula; 35.80% to save	Perlla; 22.64% to save	Aloísio; 15.94% to save	Gabi; 35.86% to save	Fernanda; 9.53% to save	Luane; 28.30% to save	Léo; 35.49% to save	Eviction cancelled	Felipe; 29.42% to save	Evandro; 30.28% to save	Caique; 1.72% to win	
Evicted	Vida; 46.84% to save	Sandro; 32.90% to save	Ana Paula; 35.80% to save	Perlla; 22.64% to save	Aloísio; 15.94% to save	Gabi; 35.86% to save	Fernanda; 9.53% to save	Luane; 28.30% to save	Léo; 35.49% to save	Eviction cancelled	Felipe; 29.42% to save	Evandro; 30.28% to save	João; 35.77% to win	
Evicted	Vida; 46.84% to save	Sandro; 32.90% to save	Ana Paula; 35.80% to save	Perlla; 22.64% to save	Aloísio; 15.94% to save	Gabi; 35.86% to save	Fernanda; 9.53% to save	Luane; 28.30% to save	Léo; 35.49% to save	Eviction cancelled	Felipe; 29.42% to save	Evandro; 30.28% to save	Rafael; 62.51% to win	

=== Notes ===
- ^Note 1: Cátia chose to stay with the blue flame in which, she had to give an immunity (João). Then, Léo was chosen by her to hold the red flame in which he should nullify four votes cast (Aloísio, Cátia, Felipe and Fernanda's votes).
- ^Note 2: Vida, as the second nominee, had to choose the third nominee among the contestants in the stall. Léo was chosen.
- ^Note 3: Due to the Fire Challenge, Caíque won an immunity only for the contestant's votes. He could be, however, nominated by the Farmer of the Week.
- ^Note 4: Nadja, as the second nominee, had to choose the third nominee among the contestants in the stall. Felipe was chosen.
- ^Note 5: Due to the Fire Challenge, the votes given by the contestants (except for the Farmer of the Week) were nullified. Then the second nominee was decided by a dynamic. Cátia, as the Red Flame's holder, started the dynamic by saving a contestant to be nominated. She saved Aloísio, who saved Luane, who saved Léo, who saved Perlla, who saved Caíque, who saved Fernanda, who saved Rafael, leaving Ana Paula as the second nominee.
- ^Note 6: Rafael, as the Blue Flame's holder, had to decide the third nominee among the members of the stall this week (Evandro, Gabi and João). Rafael chose Evandro.
- ^Note 7: Rafael, as the second nominee, had to choose the third nominee among the contestants in the stall (Caíque, Felipe, Fernanda and Luane). He chose Luane.
- ^Note 8: Due to the Fire Challenge, Felipe was immune from the Farmer of the Week's nomination.
- ^Note 9: As the second nominee, Nadja had to choose the third nominee among the contestants in the stall (Aloísio, Caíque and Fernanda). She chose Aloísio.
- ^Note 10: Due to the Fire Challenge, Caíque had to nominate two contestants: one from each team.
- ^Note 11: Evandro had to choose the third nominee from the contestants in the stall (Cátia, Léo and Nadja). He chose Cátia.
- ^Note 12: Nadja was ejected from the competition after attacking Caíque.
- ^Note 13: Cátia was ejected from the competition after attacking Evandro. Due to her ejection, the planned eviction was cancelled.

== Ratings and reception ==
=== Brazilian ratings ===
All numbers are in points and provided by Kantar Ibope Media.

Week	First air date	Last air date	Timeslot (BRT)	Daily SP viewers (in points)							SP viewers (in points)	BR viewers (in points)	Ref.
Week	First air date	Last air date	Timeslot (BRT)	Mon	Tue	Wed	Thu	Fri	Sat	Sun	SP viewers (in points)	BR viewers (in points)	Ref.
1	September 18, 2018	September 23, 2018	Everyday; 10:45 p.m.	—	9.8	10.5	10.0	9.4	6.6	7.8	9.0	7.4	
2	September 24, 2018	September 30, 2018	Everyday; 10:45 p.m.	8.6	7.3	7.7	8.1	8.7	7.2	7.3	7.8	—N/a	
3	October 1, 2018	October 7, 2018	Everyday; 10:45 p.m.	7.3	9.3	10.6	9.3						
4	October 8, 2018	October 14, 2018	Everyday; 10:45 p.m.										

- In 2018, each point represents 248.647 households in 15 market cities in Brazil (71.855 households in São Paulo)
