= Bake Off Celebridades season 1 =

Bake Off Celebridades
- Season 1
- Presented by: Nadja Haddad
- Judges: Beca Milano; Olivier Anquier
- No. of contestants: 16
- Winner: Dony
- Runner-up: Renata
- No. of episodes: 9

Release
- Original network: SBT; Discovery Home & Health
- Original release: February 20 – April 17, 2021

Season chronology
- Next → Season 2

The first season of Bake Off Celebridades premiered on Saturday, February 20, 2021, at 10:30 / 9:30 p.m. (BRT / AMT) on SBT, aiming to find the best celebrity baker in Brazil.

== Bakers ==
It featured two returning contestants: Gabriel Santana (from Bake Off SBT 1) and Maisa Silva (from Bake Off SBT 3).

The following is a list of contestants:

Celebrity	Age	Occupation	Hometown	Status	Finish
Dalton Vigh	56	Actor	Rio de Janeiro	Eliminated 1st	16th 15th
Fernanda Venturini	50	Former volleyball player	Araraquara	Eliminated 1st	16th 15th
Maria Gal	45	Actress	Salvador	Eliminated 2nd	14th 13th
Julio Cocielo	27	YouTuber	Osasco	Eliminated 2nd	14th 13th
Maisa Silva	18	TV host	São Bernardo	Eliminated 3rd	12th 11th
Monalysa Alcântara	22	Model	Teresina	Eliminated 3rd	12th 11th
Alessandro Campos	39	Priest	Guaratinguetá	Eliminated 4th	10th 9th
Gabriel Santana	21	Actor	Rio de Janeiro	Eliminated 4th	10th 9th
Marcello Airoldi	50	Actor	Barueri	Eliminated 5th	Returned
Thaís Pacholek	37	Actress	Curitiba	Eliminated 5th	8th
Pyong Lee	28	YouTuber	São Paulo	Eliminated 6th	Returned
Rodrigo Cintra	48	Hair stylist	São Paulo	Eliminated 6th	7th
Robson Jassa	41	Hair stylist	Cuité	Eliminated 7th	6th 5th
Renata Kuerten	32	Model	Braço do Norte	Eliminated 7th	6th 5th
Pyong Lee	28	YouTuber	São Paulo	Eliminated 8th	4th 3rd
Marcello Airoldi	50	Actor	Barueri	Eliminated 8th	4th 3rd
Renata Dominguez	40	Actress	Rio de Janeiro	Runner-up	2nd
Dony De Nuccio	36	TV host	Americana	Winner	1st

== Results summary ==
Elimination chart
Baker	1	2	3	4	5	6	7	8	9
Dony			SB			SB		SB	WIN
Renata	SB			SB					OUT
Marcelo		SB			OUT		RET		OUT
Pyong						OUT	RET		OUT
Kuerten								OUT	
Jassa								OUT	
Rodrigo						OUT			
Thaís					OUT				
Gabriel				OUT					
Alessandro				OUT					
Monalysa			OUT						
Maisa			OUT						
Cocielo		OUT							
Maria Gal		OUT							
Fernanda	OUT								
Dalton	OUT								

Key
Advanced
Judges' favourite bakers
Star Baker
Eliminated
Judges' bottom bakers
Returned
Runner-up
Winner

=== Technical challenges ranking ===
Baker	1	2	3	4	5	6	7	8	9
Dony	11th	5th	1st	9th	7th	1st		1st	1st
Renata	2nd	11th	3rd	2nd	3rd	3rd		2nd	2nd
Marcelo	7th	2nd	6th	5th	8th		3rd	3rd	—
Pyong	12th	13th	7th	8th	2nd	4th	2nd	4th	—
Kuerten	3rd	6th	8th	6th	1st	5th		5th	
Jassa	6th	10th	4th	4th	5th	2nd		5th	
Rodrigo	8th	1st	2nd	3rd	4th	6th	1st		
Thaís	1st	3rd	5th	1st	6th		5th		
Gabriel	4th	14th	10th	7th			9th		
Alessandro	5th	7th	9th	10th			—		
Monalysa	9th	4th	11th				8th		
Maisa	13th	9th	12th				7th		
Cocielo	10th	8th					4th		
Maria Gal	15th	12th					6th		
Fernanda	14th						10th		
Dalton	16th						—		

Key
Star Baker
Eliminated

== Ratings and reception ==
=== Brazilian ratings ===
All numbers are in points and provided by Kantar Ibope Media.

Episode	Air date	Timeslot (BRT)	SP viewers (in points)	Source
1	February 20, 2021	Saturday 10:30 p.m.	6.3	
2	February 27, 2021	Saturday 10:30 p.m.	5.7	
3	March 6, 2021	Saturday 10:30 p.m.	6.3	
4	March 13, 2021	Saturday 10:30 p.m.	5.2	
5	March 20, 2021	Saturday 10:30 p.m.	5.7	
6	March 27, 2021	Saturday 10:30 p.m.	6.1	
7	April 3, 2021	Saturday 10:30 p.m.	5.8	
8	April 10, 2021	Saturday 10:30 p.m.	5.1	
9	April 17, 2021	Saturday 10:30 p.m.	6.4	

- In 2021, each point represents 268.278 households in 15 market cities in Brazil (76.577 households in São Paulo).
