= Bake Off Celebridades =

- Genre: Cooking; Baking; Reality
- Based on: Celebrity Bake Off
- Presented by: Nadja Haddad
- Judges: Beca Milano; Olivier Anquier; Carlos Bertolazzi; Giuseppe Gerundino
- Narrated by: Nadja Haddad
- Country of origin: Brazil
- No. of seasons: 5

Production
- Production locations: São Paulo, São Paulo
- Camera setup: Multiple-camera
- Running time: 120 minutes

Original release
- Network: SBT
- Release: February 20, 2021 – May 6, 2023

Related
- Bake Off Brasil; Junior Bake Off; Bake Off SBT

Bake Off Celebridades (English: Bake Off Celebrities) is a Brazilian reality television competition spin-off from the main series Bake Off Brasil featuring celebrities as contestants.

The series premiered on Saturday, February 20, 2021, at 10:30 / 9:30 p.m. (BRT / AMT) on SBT, aiming to find the best celebrity baker in Brazil., returning in 2025, in a special format and in pairs.

== Host and judges ==
Key
Host
Judge

Cast member	Seasons				
Cast member	1	2	3	4	5
Nadja Haddad					
Beca Milano					
Olivier Anquier					
Carlos Bertolazzi					
Giuseppe Gerundino					

== Series overview ==
Season	Winner	Runner-up
1	Dony De Nuccio	Renata Dominguez
2	Érica Reis	Bianca Rinaldi
3	Natália Deodato	Rodrigo Capella
4	Comandante Hamilton; Liminha	Lindezo; Nina

== Ratings and reception ==
Season	Timeslot (BRT)	Premiered		Ended		TV season	SP viewers (in points)	Source
Season	Timeslot (BRT)	Date	Viewers (in points)	Date	Viewers (in points)	TV season	SP viewers (in points)	Source
1	Saturday 10:30 p.m.	February 20, 2021	6.3	April 17, 2021	6.4	2021	5.84	
2	Saturday 10:30 p.m.	March 5, 2022	4.6	April 30, 2022	4.8	2022	4.37	
3	Saturday 9:30 p.m.	March 11, 2023	3.8	May 6, 2023	4.5	2023	4.08	

- Each point represents a specific number of households in São Paulo.
  - 2021: 76.577 households.
  - 2022: 74.666 households.
  - 2023: 76.953 households.
