= Big Brother Brasil 8 =

- Season 8
- Presented by: Pedro Bial
- No. of days: 78
- No. of housemates: 14
- Winner: Rafinha Ribeiro
- Runner-up: Gyselle Soares
- No. of episodes: 78

Release
- Original network: Globo
- Original release: January 8 – March 25, 2008

Season chronology
- ← Previous; Big Brother Brasil 7 Next → Big Brother Brasil 9

Big Brother Brasil 8 was the eighth season of Big Brother Brasil which premiered January 8, 2008, with the season finale airing March 25, 2008, on the Rede Globo television network.

The show is produced by Endemol Globo and presented by news reporter Pedro Bial. The season was officially confirmed since 2001 as part of the original contract between international Endemol and Rede Globo that provided seasons until 2008.

The grand prize was R$1 million with tax allowances, with a R$100,000 prize offered to the runner up and a R$50,000 prize offered to the 3rd place. In the end, 26-year-old musician Rafinha Ribeiro from Campinas, SP, won the competition over student Gyselle Soares with 50.15% of the final vote. There were 75 million votes cast on the season finale, the show's record at the time.

== Overview ==
There were fourteen housemates competing for the grand prize, a decrease over the previous season. The season introduced the "big phone" and the "haves and have-nots" concept. It lasted 78 days, a decrease of one week over the previous season.

=== Controversy ===
On week 7, journalism student and housemate Juliana Góes fainted inside a glass chamber during an endurance competition. Newspapers and websites proclaimed Big Brother Brasil to be inhumane. However, the show was unaffected by the negative press.

== Housemates ==
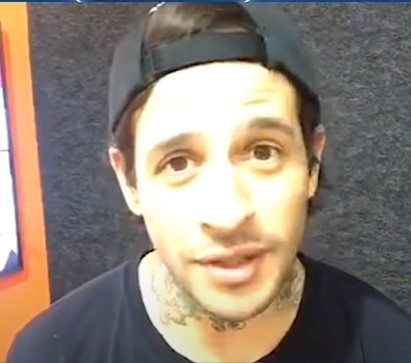
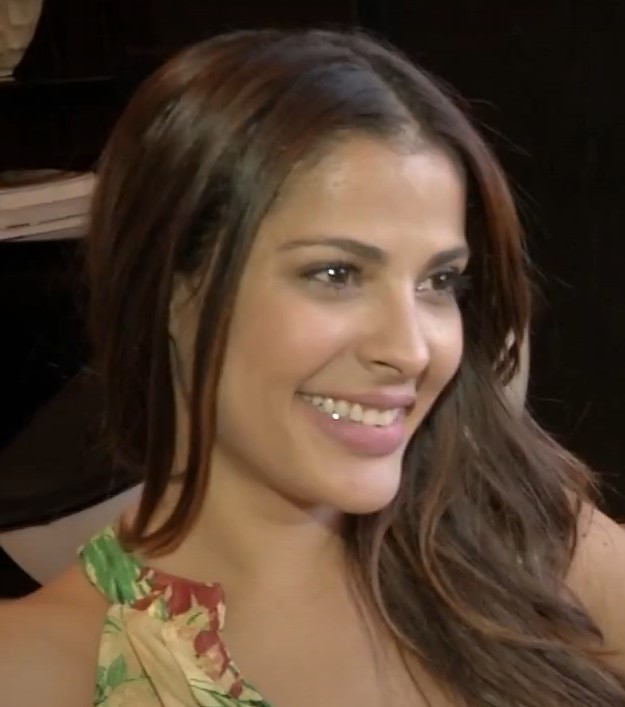
Rafinha Carvalho (Winner) and Gyselle Soares (Runner-up), the finalists of Big Brother Brasil 8.

The cast list was unveiled on January 3, 2008.

(ages stated at time of contest)

Name	Age	Occupation	Hometown	Day entered	Day exited	Result
Rafinha Carvalho	26	Musician	Campinas	1	78	Winner
Gyselle Soares	24	Student	Teresina	1	78	Runner-up
Natalia Casassola	22	Model	Passo Fundo	1	76	12th Evicted
Marcos Parmagnani	26	Student	Vitória	1	75	11th Evicted
Thatiana Bione	21	English Teacher	Brasília	1	71	10th Evicted
Marcelo Arantes	31	Doctor	Uberlândia	1	64	9th Evicted
Juliana Góes	22	Journalism Student	Santos	1	57	8th Evicted
Felipe Basílio	21	Student	São Paulo	1	50	7th Evicted
Fernando Mesquita	25	Account Manager	Rio de Janeiro	1	43	6th Evicted
Bianca Jahara	28	Fashion Producer	Rio de Janeiro	1	36	5th Evicted
Thalita Lippi	29	Actress	Rio de Janeiro	1	29	4th Evicted
Alexandre Scaquette	24	Model	Limeira	1	22	3rd Evicted
Rafael Memória	24	Medical Student	Fortaleza	1	15	2nd Evicted
Jaqueline Khury	23	Model	São Paulo	1	8	1st Evicted

== Future appearances ==
In 2010, Natália Casassola was contender to be a competitor on Big Brother Brasil 10, but ultimately did not return, eventually in 2013 she returned in Big Brother Brasil 13 and finished in 4th place.

In 2023, Gyselle Soares appeared on A Grande Conquista 1, she have to compete for a place to enter in the game, Gyselle won her place in the mansion and finished the game 4th place.

== Voting history ==
	Week 1	Week 2	Week 3	Week 4	Week 5	Week 6	Week 7	Week 8	Week 9	Week 10	Week 11			Nominations received
	Week 1	Week 2	Week 3	Week 4	Week 5	Week 6	Week 7	Week 8	Week 9	Week 10	Day 74	Day 75	Finale	Nominations received
Head of Household	Juliana	Bianca	Thalita	Gyselle	Thatiana	Marcelo	Marcelo	Rafinha	Thatiana	Rafinha	Natalia	Rafinha	(none)	
Power of Immunity	Gyselle	Fernando	Marcos	Thatiana	Bianca	Juliana	Thatiana	Juliana	Rafinha	(none)		(none)	(none)	
Saved	Rafinha	Natalia	Rafinha	Juliana	Fernando	Felipe	Juliana	Thatiana	Gyselle	(none)		(none)	(none)	
Big Phone	(none)	Rafael	(none)	Bianca	Marcelo	Felipe	Thatiana	Marcos	Marcelo	Gyselle	Rafinha	(none)	(none)	
Nomination (Twist)	(none)	(none)	Gyselle	Bianca	Marcelo	Thatiana	Thatiana	Marcelo	(none)			(none)	(none)	
Nomination (HoH)	Gyselle	Rafael	Alexandre	Fernando	Bianca	Natalia	Natalia	Juliana	Marcelo	Thatiana	Gyselle	Gyselle; Natalia	(none)	
Nomination (Housemates)	Jaqueline	Rafinha	Thatiana	Thalita	Felipe	Fernando	Felipe	Gyselle	Rafinha	Gyselle	Marcos	Gyselle; Natalia	(none)	
Rafinha	Marcelo	Thalita	Thatiana	Thalita	Juliana	Marcos	Marcos	Head of Household	Marcos	Head of Household	Not; Eligible	Head of Household	Winner (Day 78)	9
Gyselle	Felipe	Felipe	Fernando	Thalita	Natalia	Fernando	Felipe	Marcos	Natalia	Marcos	Marcos	Nominated	Runner-Up (Day 78)	17
Natalia	Jaqueline	Juliana	Juliana	Marcelo	Rafinha	Gyselle	Gyselle	Gyselle	Rafinha	Gyselle	Head of Household	Nominated	Evicted (Day 76)	7
Marcos	Jaqueline	Thalita	Bianca	Thalita	Felipe	Fernando	Felipe	Gyselle	Rafinha	Gyselle	Not Eligible	Evicted (Day 75)		15
Thatiana	Jaqueline	Rafinha	Fernando	Rafinha	Felipe	Fernando	Felipe	Gyselle	Rafinha	Gyselle	Evicted (Day 71)			4
Marcelo	Fernando	Rafinha	Thatiana	Thalita	Natalia	Head of Household	Head of Household	Marcos	Natalia	Evicted (Day 64)				8
Juliana	Head of Household	Gyselle	Marcelo	Thalita	Felipe	Fernando	Gyselle	Gyselle	Evicted (Day 57)					5
Felipe	Marcos	Gyselle	Marcos	Natalia	Gyselle	Marcos	Marcos	Evicted (Day 50)						10
Fernando	Jaqueline	Felipe	Marcos	Marcelo	Gyselle	Juliana	Evicted (Day 43)							8
Bianca	Rafael	Rafinha	Thatiana	Marcelo	Marcos	Evicted (Day 36)								2
Thalita	Alexandre	Marcos	Head of Household	Marcelo	Evicted (Day 29)									8
Alexandre	Marcelo	Gyselle	Felipe	Evicted (Day 22)										2
Rafael	Thalita	Rafinha	Evicted (Day 15)											2
Jaqueline	Marcos	Evicted (Day 8)												4
Notes	1	2	3	4, 5	6, 7	8	9, 10	11	12, 13	14	15	16	(none)	
Nominated for Eviction	Gyselle; Jaqueline	Rafael; Rafinha	Alexandre; Gyselle; Thatiana	Bianca; Fernando; Thalita	Bianca; Felipe; Marcelo	Fernando; Natalia; Thatiana	Felipe; Natalia; Thatiana	Gyselle; Juliana; Marcelo	Marcelo; Rafinha	Gyselle; Thatiana	Gyselle; Marcos	Gyselle; Natalia	Gyselle; Rafinha	
Evicted	Jaqueline; 87% to evict	Rafael; 63% to evict	Alexandre; 45% to evict	Thalita; 65% to evict	Bianca; 60% to evict	Fernando; 62% to evict	Felipe; 44% to evict	Juliana; 50% to evict	Marcelo; 71% to evict	Thatiana; 70% to evict	Marcos; 54% to evict	Natalia; 54% to evict	Gyselle; 49.85% to win	
Survived	Gyselle; 13% to evict	Rafinha; 37% to evict	Gyselle; 32% to evict	Bianca; 18% to evict	Marcelo; 29% to evict	Thatiana; 25% to evict	Thatiana; 29% to evict	Marcelo; 47% to evict	Rafinha; 29% to evict	Gyselle; 30% to evict	Gyselle; 46% to evict	Gyselle; 46% to evict	Rafinha; 50.15% to win	
Survived	Gyselle; 13% to evict	Rafinha; 37% to evict	Thatiana; 23% to evict	Fernando; 17% to evict	Felipe; 11% to evict	Natalia; 13% to evict	Natalia; 27% to evict	Gyselle; 3% to evict	Rafinha; 29% to evict	Gyselle; 30% to evict	Gyselle; 46% to evict	Gyselle; 46% to evict	Rafinha; 50.15% to win	

=== Notes ===
- ^Note 1: During the launch night, the housemates competed in a surprise challenge. Bianca and Natalia were the winners and the public voted for of them to win an extra immunity. Bianca won the vote with 50.68%.
- ^Note 2: Gyselle and Rafinha received the most nominations with 3 each. Bianca, as current Head of Household, had the casting vote and chose Rafinha to be the second nominee.
- ^Note 3: Minutes before the second eviction result was announced, Rafael answered the Big Phone and won the Fulminat Nomination Power for week 3 eviction. He chose Gyselle, who could only remove herself from the block if she had won the week 3 HoH competition. Since she lost, she remained nominated for the rest of the week. After the live nominations on day 20, Alexandre (nominated by the HoH vote) and Thatiana (nominated by the House vote) joined Gyselle as this week's nominees, making this the first time 3 housemates were nominated at the same time (excluding the finals).
- ^Note 4: Bianca answered the Big Phone and therefore, was automatically nominated for eviction.
- ^Note 5: Marcello and Thalita received the most nominations with 4 each. Gyselle, as current Head of Household, had the casting vote and chose Thalita to be the second nominee.
- ^Note 6: Marcelo answered the Big Phone and was ordered to choose two housemates to stay handcuffed with him until the vote. On Sunday, they decided as a group who would become the first nominee. Marcelo chose Gyselle and Juliana. On Sunday, he volunteered himself to be the first nominee.
- ^Note 7: Felipe, Gyselle and Natalia received the most nominations with 2 each. Thatiana, as current Head of Household, had the casting vote and chose Felipe to be the second nominee.
- ^Note 8: Felipe answered the Big Phone and was ordered to choose two housemates to wear gloves until the vote. Then on Sunday, the current HoH Marcelo would decide who would become the first nominee. On Sunday, Marcelo chose Thatiana to be the first nominee.
- ^Note 9: On day 45, host Pedro Bial revealed only to the public that the first housemate to be eliminated in week 7's HoH endurance competition would be automatically nominated for eviction. Thatiana was the first person out of the challenge and become the first nominee. However, the housemates were only informed about the twist during the live nominations on day 48.
- ^Note 10: Thatiana answered the Big Phone and won the Power of Veto. This power gave her two options: veto the HoH or PoI holder. Since Thatiana won the PoI, she could only veto the HoH Marcelo's choice. She was ordered to wear a red shirt until the vote. Then, on Sunday, veto holder Thatiana had to use her power on the HoH's choice Felipe, forcing HoH Marcelo to nominate Natalia in his place.
- ^Note 11: Marcos answered the Big Phone and won the Fulminat Nomination Power for this week's eviction. He chose Marcelo to be automatically nominated.
- ^Note 12: Marcelo answered the Big Phone and won the Immunity Veto. He was ordered to choose one housemate to wear a yellow shirt until the vote. On Sunday, that housemate wouldn't be allow to receive immunity from the PoI holder. Marcelo chose Rafinha, who won the PoI competition the following day. Rafinha gave immunity to Gyselle.
- ^Note 13: Natalia and Rafinha received the most nominations with 2 each. Thatiana, as current Head of Household, had the casting vote and chose Rafinha to be the second nominee.
- ^Note 14: Gyselle answered the Big Phone and was ordered to anticipate her nomination. She should put a bracelet on the person she was nominating as way to keep this secret from her fellow her housemates. She nominated Marcos, who should wear the bracelet until the vote.
- ^Note 15: Natalia won the Head of Household and nominated Gyselle for eviction. Since Marcos and Rafinha's votes would cancel each other out, only Gyselle was eligible to nominate. She chose Marcos to be the second nominee.
- ^Note 16: Rafinha won the final Head of Household competition. Therefore, Gyselle and Natalia were automatically nominated for eviction by default.

=== Have and Have-Nots ===
	Week 2	Week 3	Week 4	Week 5	Week 6	Week 7	Week 8	Week 9	Week 10	Week 11
Rafinha	Have	Have	Have-Not	Have	Have-Not	Have-Not	Have-Not	Lost	Lost	Final; Week
Gyselle	Have-Not	Have-Not	Have	Have	Have-Not	Have	Have	Lost	Won	Final; Week
Natalia	Have-Not	Have	Have	Have-Not	Have-Not	Have	Have-Not	Lost	Won	Final; Week
Marcos	Have	Have	Have	Have	Have	Have	Have-Not	Lost	Won	Final; Week
Thatiana	Have	Have	Have	Have	Have	Have	Have	Won	Lost	
Marcelo	Have-Not	Have-Not	Have	Have	Have	Have-Not	Have	Lost		
Juliana	Have	Have	Have-Not	Have-Not	Have	Have-Not	Have			
Felipe	Have-Not	Have-Not	Have-Not	Have-Not	Have-Not	Have-Not				
Fernando	Have-Not	Have-Not	Have-Not	Have-Not	Have-Not					
Bianca	Have-Not	Have-Not	Have-Not	Have-Not						
Thalita	Have-Not	Have-Not	Have-Not							
Alexandre	Have	Have								
Rafael	Have									
