= Bake Off Celebridades season 2 =

Bake Off Celebridades
- Season 2
- Presented by: Nadja Haddad
- Judges: Beca Milano; Olivier Anquier
- No. of contestants: 16
- Winner: Érica
- Runner-up: Bianca
- No. of episodes: 9

Release
- Original network: SBT; Discovery Home & Health
- Original release: March 5 – April 30, 2022

Season chronology
- ← Previous; Season 1 Next → Season 3

The second season of Bake Off Celebridades premiered on Saturday, March 5, 2022, at 10:30 / 9:30 p.m. (BRT / AMT) on SBT, aiming to find the best celebrity baker in Brazil.

== Bakers ==
It featured a returning contestant: Carlo Porto (from Bake Off SBT 1).

The following is a list of contestants:

Celebrity	Age	Occupation	Hometown	Status	Finish
Gui Napolitano	31	Model	Presidente Prudente	Eliminated 1st	16th 15th
Suzana Alves	43	Actress	São Paulo	Eliminated 1st	16th 15th
Afonso Nigro	51	Singer	São Paulo	Eliminated 2nd	14th 13th
Íris Stefanelli	42	TV host	Tupã	Eliminated 2nd	14th 13th
Sebastian Soul	56	Actor	Belo Horizonte	Eliminated 3rd	12th 11th
Vincenzo Richy	27	Actor	Naples, Italy	Eliminated 3rd	12th 11th
Marthina Brandt	30	Miss Brasil 2015	Vale Real	Eliminated 4th	10th 9th
Sula Miranda	58	Singer	São Paulo	Eliminated 4th	10th 9th
Carlo Porto	40	Actor	Governador Valadares	Eliminated 5th	8th 7th
Karina Bacchi	45	Actress	São Manuel	Eliminated 5th	8th 7th
Júlia Olliver	18	Actress	São Paulo	Eliminated 6th	6th
Marcelo Torres	46	Journalist	Andradas	Eliminated 7th	5th
Nicholas Torres	22	Actor	São Paulo	Eliminated 8th	4th
Diego Montez	32	Actor	Cotia	Eliminated 9th	3rd
Bianca Rinaldi	47	Actress	São Paulo	Runner-up	2nd
Érica Reis	39	TV host	São Paulo	Winner	1st

== Results summary ==
Elimination chart
Baker	1	2	3	4	5	6	7	8	9
Érica				SB			SB		WIN
Bianca	SB								OUT
Diego			SB		SB				OUT
Nicholas								OUT	
Marcelo						SB	OUT		
Júlia		SB				OUT			
Karina					OUT				
Carlo					OUT				
Sula				OUT					
Marthina				OUT					
Vincenzo			OUT						
Sebastian			OUT						
Íris		OUT							
Afonso		OUT							
Suzana	OUT								
Gui	OUT								

Key
Star Baker
Judges' favourite bakers
Advanced
Judges' bottom bakers
Eliminated
Runner-up
Winner

=== Technical challenges ranking ===
Baker	1	2	3	4	5	6	7	8	9
Érica	12th	7th	10th	1st	6th	4th	2nd	1st	1st
Bianca	1st	3rd	9th	9th	1st	6th	4th	3rd	2nd
Diego	2nd	6th	1st	3rd	2nd	3rd	3rd	2nd	3rd
Nicholas	11th	8th	2nd	4th	4th	2nd	1st	4th	
Marcelo	9th	5th	7th	6th	5th	1st	5th		
Júlia	3rd	2nd	4th	2nd	3rd	5th			
Karina	4th	1st	3rd	7th	8th				
Carlo	10th	9th	8th	5th	7th				
Sula	6th	10th	6th	10th					
Marthina	5th	4th	5th	8th					
Vincenzo	8th	11th	11th						
Sebastian	13th	13th	12th						
Íris	7th	14th							
Afonso	14th	12th							
Suzana	16th								
Gui	15th								

Key
Star Baker
Eliminated

== Ratings and reception ==
=== Brazilian ratings ===
All numbers are in points and provided by Kantar Ibope Media.

Episode	Air date	Timeslot (BRT)	SP viewers (in points)	Source
1	March 5, 2022	Saturday 10:30 p.m.	4.8	
2	March 12, 2022	Saturday 10:30 p.m.	4.6	
3	March 19, 2022	Saturday 10:30 p.m.	4.6	
4	March 26, 2022	Saturday 10:30 p.m.	4.0	
5	April 2, 2022	Saturday 10:30 p.m.	4.4	
6	April 9, 2022	Saturday 10:30 p.m.	4.6	
7	April 16, 2022	Saturday 10:30 p.m.	3.7	
8	April 23, 2022	Saturday 10:30 p.m.	3.8	
9	April 30, 2022	Saturday 10:30 p.m.	4.8	

- In 2022, each point represents 258.821 households in 15 market cities in Brazil (74.666 households in São Paulo).
