= Gyselle Soares =

French-Brazilian actress and television personality

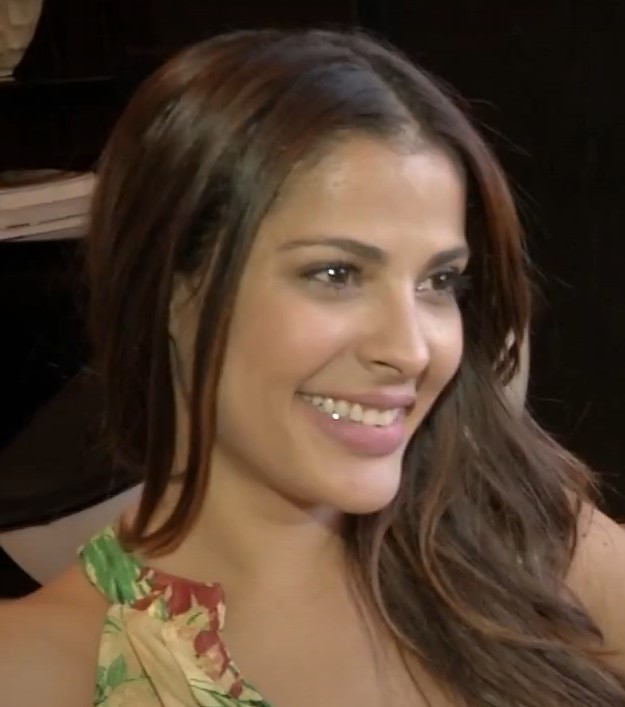
- Soares in 2013
- Born: Gyselle Soares Estevão; 27 October 1983 (age 42); Teresina, Piauí, Brazil
- Occupations: Actress; columnist; television personality
- Years active: 2008–present
- Notable credit: Big Brother Brasil 8
- Website: www.gysellesoares.com

Gyselle Soares Estevão (born 27 October 1983) is a French-Brazilian actress, columnist and television personality.

== Early life ==
Gyselle Soares was born in Teresina in the state of Piauí, but spent her entire childhood in the small town of Timon in the state of Maranhão. Her mother, who was a school teacher and loved France, gave her the name Gyselle, taken from a French novel. At an early age, Gyselle became passionated of dancing, singing and acting. She later took classes of samba and created shows in her town.

She did various jobs until the age of 18 to save money for a trip in Europe, where she started in Switzerland working au pair to pay classes of French. A casting director noticed her while she was working as a waitress in a bar at Geneve and proposed her to start a modeling career.

== Career ==
=== Television career ===
After a first experience in the fifth season of the reality program L'Île de la Tentation (French version of Temptation Island), Gyselle took theater classes in Paris while pursuing her modeling career. In 2007, she participated at the reality program Big Brother Brasil, where she reached the final but losing at 0.30% of the votes. After her success in the program, she appeared in several magazine covers and many fan clubs were created in her country.

In 2010, she became the presenter of the television program Miss Bikini broadcast on TF6 and where she is a coach for two French women who have to confront ten Brazilians. Gyselle decides at that time to live in France, but continues going back to Brazil for her career.

In February 2014, she was the new columnist in L'Émission pour tous hosted by Laurent Ruquier on France 2 and in the radio program On va s'gêner on Europe 1. On 23 August 2014, Soares participated in the television game show Fort Boyard.

=== Acting career ===
Gyselle Soares started as an actress playing in the comedy telenovela A turma do didi broadcast on Globo, the first Brazilian channel. She then played two roles in the films Os sohnos de um sonhador and Natasha.

In 2011, while taking classes at the Cours Florent, she briefly appeared in the French series Camping paradis broadcast on TF1, and also has a supporting role in the 2012 comedy film Dépression et des potes with Ary Abittan and Fred Testot.

== See also ==
- Big Brother Brasil 8 (Runner-up)
- A Grande Conquista 1 (4th place)
