= Bake Off Celebridades season 3 =

Bake Off Celebridades
- Season 3
- Presented by: Nadja Haddad
- Judges: Beca Milano; Carlos Bertolazzi
- No. of contestants: 16
- Winner: Natália
- Runner-up: Rodrigo
- No. of episodes: 9

Release
- Original network: SBT; Discovery Home & Health
- Original release: March 11 – May 6, 2023

Season chronology
- ← Previous; Season 2

The third season of Bake Off Celebridades premiered on Saturday, March 11, 2023, at 9:30 / 8:30 p.m. (BRT / AMT) on SBT, aiming to find the best celebrity baker in Brazil.

This season marks the debut of chef Carlos Bertolazzi as a judge, replacing Olivier Anquier, who left the show following production of the previous season.

== Bakers ==
The following is a list of contestants:

Celebrity	Age	Occupation	Hometown	Status	Finish
Pimpolho	52	Singer	São Paulo	Eliminated 1st	16th 15th
Camila Loures	27	Digital influencer	Belo Horizonte	Eliminated 1st	16th 15th
Duda Reis	21	Digital influencer	Volta Redonda	Withdrew	14th
Babi Xavier	47	Actress	Niterói	Eliminated 2nd	13th
MC Davi	23	Singer	Jardim Brasil	Eliminated 3rd	12th 11th
Michelle Barros	43	Journalist	Maceió	Eliminated 3rd	12th 11th
Gianne Albertoni	41	Former model	São Paulo	Eliminated 4th	10th 9th
Barbara Fialho	35	Model	Montes Claros	Eliminated 4th	10th 9th
Carla Vilhena	55	Journalist	Rio de Janeiro	Eliminated 5th	8th 7th
Eliezer do Carmo	32	Digital influencer	Volta Redonda	Eliminated 5th	8th 7th
Velson D'Souza	37	Actor	Ribeirão Preto	Eliminated 6th	6th
Helô Pinheiro	77	Businesswoman	Rio de Janeiro	Eliminated 7th	5th
Thammy Miranda	39	Politician	São Paulo	Eliminated 8th	4th
Dani Gondim	29	Actress	Fortaleza	Eliminated 9th	3rd
Rodrigo Capella	40	Comedian	Rio de Janeiro	Runner-up	2nd
Natália Deodato	23	Digital influencer	Belo Horizonte	Winner	1st

== Results summary ==
Elimination chart
Baker	1	2	3	4	5	6	7	8	9
Natália				SB					WIN
Rodrigo									OUT
Dani			SB				SB		OUT
Thammy	SB					SB		OUT	
Helô							OUT		
Velson					SB	OUT			
Eliezer					OUT				
Carla					OUT				
Barbara				OUT					
Gianne				OUT					
Michelle			OUT						
MC Davi		SB	OUT						
Babi		OUT							
Duda		WDR							
Camila	OUT								
Pimpolho	OUT								

Key
Star Baker
Judges' favourite bakers
Advanced
Judges' bottom bakers
Eliminated
Runner-up
Winner
Withdrew

=== Technical challenges ranking ===
Baker	1	2	3	4	5	6	7	8	9
Natália	3rd	2nd	7th	2nd	6th	2nd	4th	3rd	2nd
Rodrigo	9th	7th	8th	1st	2nd	4th	3rd	2nd	1st
Dani	2nd	5th	3rd	4th	8th	6th	1st	1st	3rd
Thammy	1st	4th	9th	3rd	1st	1st	2nd	4th	
Helô	14th	8th	5th	7th	5th	3rd	5th		
Velson	7th	9th	6th	8th	4th	5th			
Eliezer	4th	10th	1st	6th	3rd				
Carla	8th	13th	11th	5th	7th				
Barbara	6th	6th	2nd	9th					
Gianne	5th	11th	4th	10th					
Michelle	10th	3rd	10th						
MC Davi	11th	1st	12th						
Babi	12th	12th							
Duda	13th	—							
Camila	15th								
Pimpolho	16th								

Key
Star Baker
Eliminated

== Ratings and reception ==
=== Brazilian ratings ===
All numbers are in points and provided by Kantar Ibope Media.

Episode	Air date	Timeslot (BRT)	SP viewers (in points)	Source
1	March 11, 2023	Saturday 9:30 p.m.	3.8	
2	March 18, 2023	Saturday 9:30 p.m.	3.5	
3	March 25, 2023	Saturday 9:30 p.m.	3.9	
4	April 1, 2023	Saturday 9:30 p.m.	4.1	
5	April 8, 2023	Saturday 9:30 p.m.	4.1	
6	April 15, 2023	Saturday 9:30 p.m.	4.6	
7	April 22, 2023	Saturday 9:30 p.m.	4.1	
8	April 29, 2023	Saturday 9:30 p.m.	4.2	
9	May 6, 2023	Saturday 9:30 p.m.	4.5	

- In 2023, each point represents 268.083 households in 15 market cities in Brazil (76.953 households in São Paulo).
