= Big Brother Brasil 22 =

- Season 22
- Hosted by: Tadeu Schmidt
- No. of days: 100
- No. of housemates: 22
- Winner: Arthur Aguiar
- Runner-up: Paulo André Camilo
- Companion shows: Rede BBB; A Eliminação
- No. of episodes: 100

Release
- Original network: TV Globo; Multishow; Globoplay
- Original release: January 17 – April 26, 2022

Season chronology
- ← Previous; Big Brother Brasil 21 Next → Big Brother Brasil 23

Big Brother Brasil 22 was the twenty-second season of Big Brother Brasil, which premiered on TV Globo on January 17, 2022. The show is produced by Globo and presented by Tadeu Schmidt, (replacing Tiago Leifert, who left the program after five editions) he who makes his debut as the new host of the series.

The grand prize is R$1.5 million with tax allowances, plus a R$150.000 prize offered to the runner-up and a R$50.000 prize offered to the housemate in third place. For the third consecutive year, the show features 20 housemates divided into two groups: "Celebrities", composed of actors, singers, professional athletes, and social media personalities, and "Civilians" composed of everyday Brazilians. On week 4, two new potential housemates entered the game as part of a twist, and they moved into the house through the public vote, bringing the total number of housemates up to 22.

On April 26, 2022, actor & singer Arthur Aguiar won the competition with 68.96% of the public vote over sprinter Paulo André Camilo and actor Douglas Silva.

== The game ==
=== Withdrawal Button ===
For the first time in the show's history, there will be an opt-out button. Thus, the housemate who wants to give up the game can just press the button, without having to resort to the diary room or the production of the program, and leave the program immediately.

The item will be visible to all housemates, in the room of the house. However, the button will be protected in an illuminated box, closed by a hatch, and can only be activated when indicated by the green light. The button will work at certain times, being unavailable and with red light during parties, from 9 pm to 9 am, to prevent housemates from pressing it while intoxicated.

=== Super HoH ===
Along with its regular powers, the HoH would also be tasked with splitting their housemates into Haves and Have-Nots as well as choosing what and how much each group would be eating.

In season twenty-two, the HoH of the week will gain new perks. The HoH's week will have at his disposal a screen to make his own musical selection in the new "HoH's Playlist" and will be able to promote an animated review with a select group of housemates inside the HoH's room. The new treat can be triggered by tokens during the reign week. However, only members of the Have group can participate in the "little party".

Another unprecedented advantage is the chance to make a direct bridge of interaction with the public: a live that the HoH can open directly on "#RedeBBB", for a limited time, during the "warm up" for the HoH's Party. The owner of the coveted crown will still have as a gift, in addition to the family portraits, a sticker album with striking images of his or her stay in house.

=== #FeedBBB ===
The theme of the reality show is such that each housemate will use a cellphone to capture moments in the house during a time determined by the production. The cell phone only allows them to post photos and videos to #FeedBBB, and see what other housemates say about each other. It does not allow contact with the outside world.

In season twenty-one, #FeedBBB introduced "Arrow", an app akin to Tinder, which housemates used to pick out their love interests in the house. The "HoH Podcast" is recorded weekly and published on the GShow website. The housemates can see when it is being recorded but do not hear the content.

=== Glass House ===
On Day 26, two additional housemates entered the Glass House where the public voted for them to enter or not enter the house. Twist introduced in Big Brother Brasil 9, re-used in Big Brother Brasil 11 (featuring the first five evicted housemates from that season), Big Brother Brasil 13 and Big Brother Brasil 20.

=== Fake Eviction ===
On day 77, it was announced that there would be a fake eviction.

=== Power of Veto ===
In some weeks, the nominated housemates compete against each other for one last chance to save themselves from eviction. The housemates nominated by the HoH are not eligible to compete and are guaranteed to face Brazil's vote.

=== Power of No ===
At the beginning of each week, the previous Head of Household may or may not be given the opportunity to disqualify some housemates from competing in the upcoming HoH competition.

Week	Previous HoH(s)	Total	Vetoed housemates
2	Douglas	3	Bárbara, Eliezer, Rodrigo
6	Medical Recommendation	1	Larissa
6	Pairs Division	1	Tiago
7	Paulo André	2	Jessilane, Linn
8	Scooby	1	Eliezer

=== Big Phone ===
Once in a while, the Big Phone rings, unleashing good or bad consequences on the nomination process for those who decide to answer it.

Week	Housemate	Date	Time (BRT)	Consequences
5	Brunna	February 18, 2022	Friday; 11:14 p.m.	See note 17
7	Jade	March 5, 2022	Saturday; 11:11 p.m.	See note 25

=== The Counterattack ===
The counterattack is a surprise power given to either the HoH's nominee and/or the House's nominee, in which they have the opportunity to automatically nominate an additional housemate for eviction. While viewers are informed when the power will be featured in advance (on Thursdays before the Head of Household competition even takes place), the housemates are only informed about the twist on the spot, during Sunday's live nominations.

Week		Housemate	Status	Used on:	Result
1		Naiara	HoH's nominee	Luciano	See note 2
4		Natália	House's nominee	Laís	See note 12
4		Arthur	HoH's nominee	Bárbara	See note 12
8		Gustavo	HoH competition veto's nominee	Vinicius	See note 28
9		Laís	HoH's nominee	Douglas	See note 31
10		Lucas	House's first nominee	Eliezer	See note 33
11	Day 77	Linn	HoH's nominee	Gustavo	See note 38
12	Day 82	Eliezer	House's nominee	Gustavo	See note 42
13	Day 89	Arthur	House's nominee	Douglas	See note 46
13	Day 91	Gustavo	House's nominee	Paulo André	See note 47

== Housemates ==
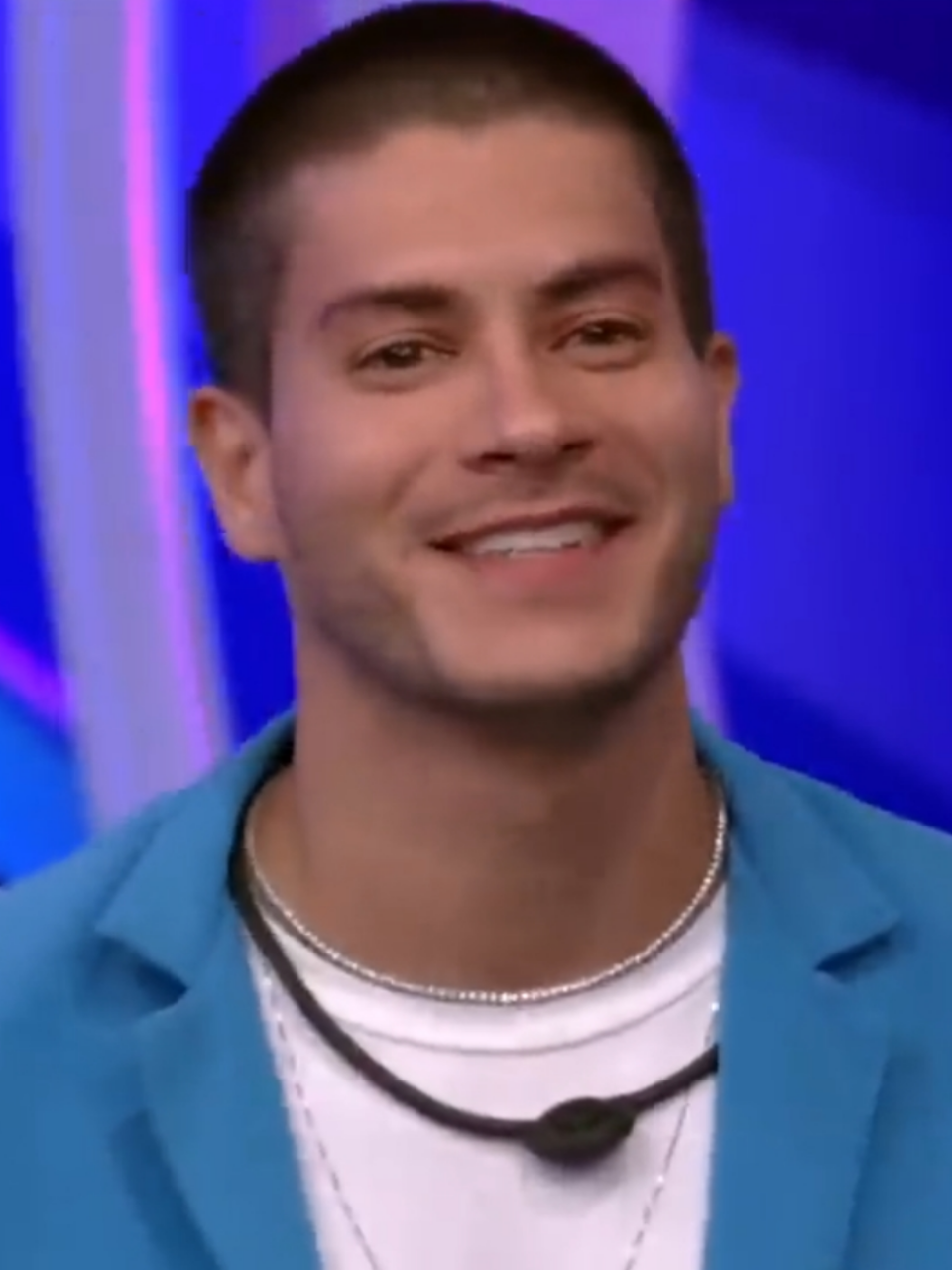
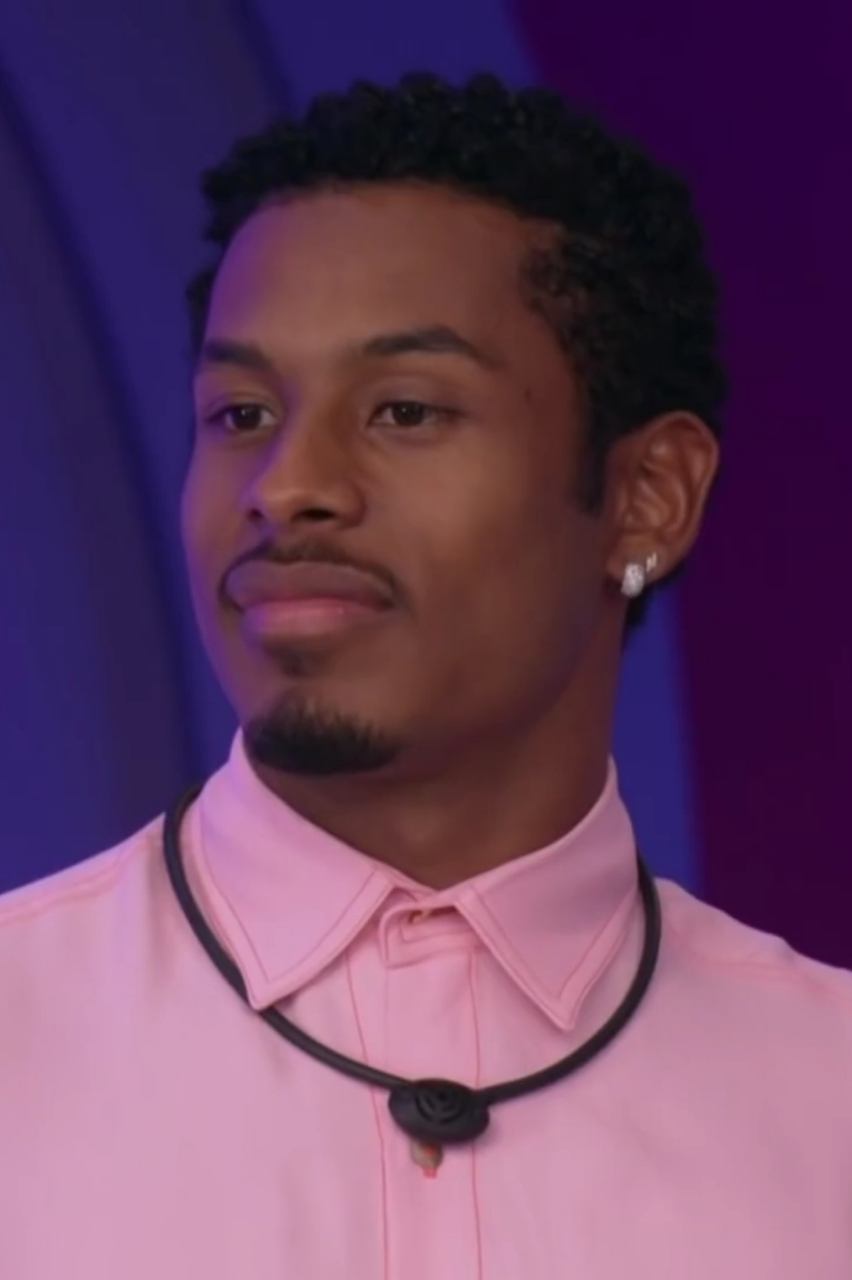
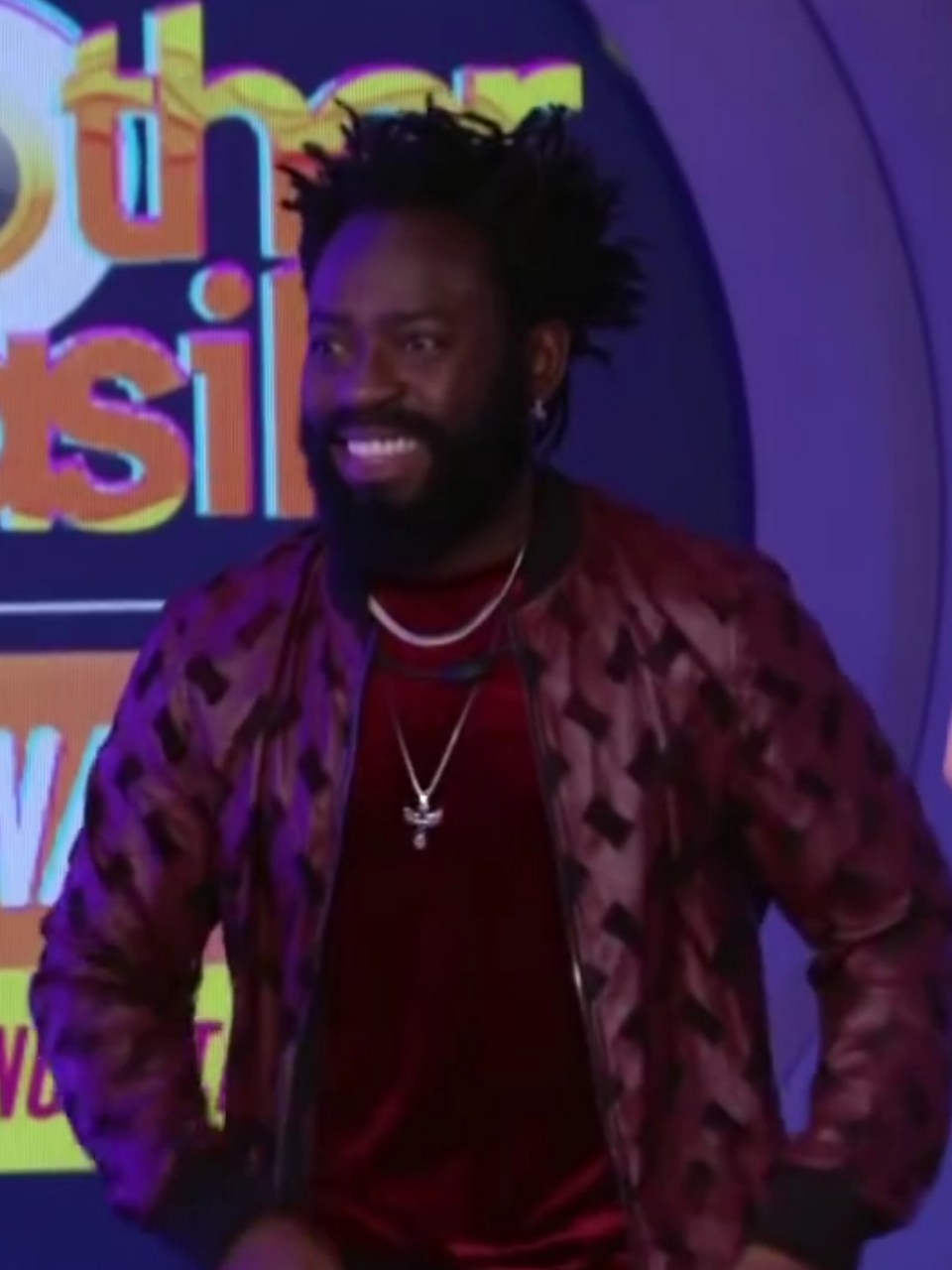
Arthur Aguiar (Winner), Paulo André Camilo (Runner-up) and Douglas Silva (Third place), the finalists of Big Brother Brasil 22.

The cast list was unveiled on January 14, 2022.

Name	Age	Type	Hometown	Occupation	Day entered	Day exited	Result
Arthur Aguiar	32	Celebrity	Rio de Janeiro	Actor & singer	4	100	Winner
Paulo André Camilo	23	Celebrity	Santo André	Sprinter	1	100	Runner-up
Douglas Silva	33	Celebrity	Rio de Janeiro	Actor	1	100	Third place
Eliezer do Carmo	31	Civilian	Volta Redonda	Designer & businessman	1	98	17th Evicted
Pedro Scooby	33	Celebrity	Rio de Janeiro	Surfer	1	95	16th Evicted
Gustavo Marsengo	31	Civilian	Curitiba	Bachelor of law	28	93	15th Evicted
Jessilane Alves	26	Civilian	Bom Jesus da Lapa	Biologist & biology teacher	1	91	14th Evicted
Natália Deodato	22	Civilian	Sabará	Nail designer & model	1	86	13th Evicted
Linn da Quebrada	31	Celebrity	São Paulo	Actress & singer	4	84	12th Evicted
Eslovênia Marques	25	Civilian	João Pessoa	Model & marketing student	1	77	11th Evicted
Lucas Bissoli	31	Civilian	Vila Velha	Engineer & medicine student	1	72	10th Evicted
Laís Caldas	30	Civilian	Crixás	Doctor	1	65	9th Evicted
Vinicius de Sousa	23	Civilian	Crato	Bachelor of law	1	58	8th Evicted
Jade Picon	20	Celebrity	São Paulo	Digital influencer & businesswoman	4	51	7th Evicted
Larissa Tomásia	25	Civilian	Limoeiro	Digital influencer & marketing coordinator	28	44	6th Evicted
Tiago Abravanel	34	Celebrity	São Paulo	Actor & TV presenter	1	42	Walked
Brunna Gonçalves	30	Celebrity	Nilópolis	Dancer & digital influencer	1	37	5th Evicted
Bárbara Heck	29	Civilian	Novo Hamburgo	Public relations & model	1	30	4th Evicted
Maria Andrade	21	Celebrity	Rio de Janeiro	Actress & singer	1	30	Ejected
Naiara Azevedo	32	Celebrity	Farol	Singer	1	23	3rd Evicted
Rodrigo Mussi	36	Civilian	São José dos Campos	Comercial manager	1	16	2nd Evicted
Luciano Estevan	28	Civilian	Florianópolis	Actor & dancer	1	9	1st Evicted
Glass House
Gustavo Marsengo	31	Civilian	Curitiba	Bachelor of law	26	28	Selected
Larissa Tomásia	25	Civilian	Limoeiro	Digital influencer & marketing coordinator	26	28	Selected

== Future appearances ==
In 2023, Eliezer do Carmo and Natália Deodato appeared on Bake Off Celebridades 3. Eliezer finished in 7th place, while Natália ended up winning the competition.

In 2023, Natália Deodato appeared on A Grande Conquista 1, she have to compete for a place to enter in the game, Natália won her place in the mansion and finished the game in 3rd place. In 2025, Natália also appeared on De Férias com o Ex Caribe as original cast member.

In 2024, Larissa Tomásia appeared in A Fazenda 16, she finished in 23rd place in the competition.

== Voting history ==
Key
– Civilians
– Celebrities
– Glass House Civilians

	Week 1	Week 2	Week 3		Week 4		Week 5	Week 6	Week 7	Week 8	Week 9	Week 10	Week 11		Week 12		Week 13		Week 14		
	Week 1	Week 2	Face-to-Face	Diary Room	Glass House	Main House	Week 5	Week 6	Week 7	Week 8	Week 9	Week 10	Day 75	Day 77	Day 82	Day 84	Day 89	Day 91	Day 93	Day 96	Finale
Head of Household	Douglas	Tiago	Jade		(none)	Jade	Lucas	Paulo André	Scooby	Lucas	Arthur	Linn	Gustavo	Paulo André	Douglas	Eliezer	Gustavo	Scooby	Paulo André	(none)	(none)
Power of Immunity	Rodrigo	Rodrigo	Bárbara		(none)	Paulo André; Scooby	Arthur	Douglas	Arthur	Arthur	Lucas	Paulo André	Jessilane	(none)	Scooby	(none)				(none)	(none)
Saved	Rodrigo	Eliezer	Bárbara; Laís		(none)	Douglas; Paulo André	Natália	Gustavo	Paulo André	Paulo André	Eslovênia	Arthur	Jessilane	(none)	Paulo André	(none)				(none)	(none)
Nomination (Twists)	Luciano	Douglas; Natália	Naiara		(none)	Bárbara; Laís	Gustavo	Arthur; Lucas	Arthur; Jade	Gustavo; Vinicius	Douglas; Gustavo	Eliezer	(none)	Arthur; Gustavo	Gustavo	Gustavo	Douglas	Paulo André	Douglas	Arthur; Douglas; Eliezer	(none)
Nomination (HoH)	Naiara	Rodrigo	Arthur		(none)	Arthur	Brunna	Linn	Jessilane	Scooby	Laís	Paulo André	Eslovênia; Paulo André	Linn	Linn	Paulo André	Eliezer; Jessilane	Eliezer	Eliezer	(none)	(none)
Nomination (Housemates)	Jade; Natália	Jessilane	Lucas	Douglas	(none)	Natália	Eliezer; Jessilane; Paulo André	Larissa	Gustavo	Douglas	Eliezer	Lucas; Scooby	Douglas	Eliezer	Eliezer	Natália	Arthur	Gustavo	Scooby	(none)	(none)
Veto Players	Jade; Luciano; Natália	Douglas; Jessilane; Natália	Douglas; Lucas; Naiara		(none)	Bárbara; Laís; Natália	Eliezer; Gustavo; Jessilane; Paulo André	Arthur; Larissa; Lucas	Arthur; Gustavo; Jade	Douglas; Gustavo; Vinicius	Douglas; Eliezer; Gustavo	Eliezer; Lucas; Scooby	(none)							(none)	(none)
Veto Winner(s)	Jade	Douglas	Lucas		(none)	Laís	Eliezer; Jessilane	Lucas	Gustavo	Douglas	Gustavo	Eliezer	(none)							(none)	(none)
Arthur	Natália; Brunna	Jessilane	Not eligible	Maria	Not eligible	Laís	Laís	Larissa	Laís	Laís	Head of Household	Lucas	Linn	Eliezer	Scooby to save	Natália	Douglas	Gustavo	Scooby	Nominated	Winner (Day 100)
Paulo André	Jessilane; Brunna	Jessilane	Maria	Not eligible	Not eligible	Linn	Eliezer	Larissa	Eliezer	Eliezer	Eliezer	Lucas	Linn	Eliezer	Gustavo to save	Natália	Arthur	Gustavo	Head of Household	Exempt	Runner-up (Day 100)
Douglas	Jade; Natália	Bárbara	Vinicius	Not eligible	Not eligible	Laís	Laís	Vinicius	Eliezer	Linn	Eliezer	Lucas	Linn	Eliezer	Head of Household	Natália	Arthur	Gustavo	Scooby	Nominated	Third place (Day 100)
Eliezer	Scooby; Natália	Jessilane	Scooby	Not eligible	Not eligible	Natália	Jessilane	Jessilane	Gustavo	Douglas	Paulo André	Lucas	Douglas	Scooby	Natália to save	Head of Household	Douglas	Gustavo	Scooby	Nominated	Evicted (Day 98)
Scooby	Jessilane; Eliezer	Vinicius	Linn	Not eligible	Not eligible	Linn	Eliezer	Larissa ^{(x2)}	Head of Household	Eliezer	Eliezer	Lucas	Linn	Eliezer	Arthur to save	Natália	Arthur	Head of Household	Arthur	Evicted (Day 95)	
Gustavo	Not in House				Glass; House	Brunna	Eliezer	Vinicius	Eliezer	Eliezer	Eliezer	Lucas	Head of Household	Eliezer	Scooby to save	Natália	Arthur	Paulo André	Evicted (Day 93)		
Jessilane	Scooby; Paulo André	Jade	Not eligible	Paulo André	Not eligible	Scooby	Paulo André	Eslovênia	Eliezer	Eliezer	Eliezer	Scooby	Douglas	Scooby	Natália to save	Gustavo	Douglas	Evicted (Day 91)			
Natália	Jade; Scooby	Paulo André	Maria	Not eligible	Not eligible	Laís	Paulo André	Eslovênia	Gustavo	Arthur	Paulo André	Scooby	Douglas	Scooby	Jessilane to save	Gustavo	Evicted (Day 86)				
Linn	Lucas; Jade	Paulo André	Not eligible	Paulo André	Not eligible	Scooby	Paulo André	Douglas	Gustavo	Douglas	Paulo André	Head of Household	Douglas	Scooby	Natália to save	Evicted (Day 84)					
Eslovênia	Jessilane; Natália	Jessilane	Not eligible	Douglas	Not eligible	Natália	Jessilane	Douglas	Gustavo	Douglas	Paulo André	Douglas	Douglas	Evicted (Day 77)							
Lucas	Brunna; Scooby	Brunna	Not eligible	Tiago	Not eligible	Tiago	Head of Household	Larissa	Eliezer	Head of Household	Eliezer	Eliezer	Evicted (Day 72)								
Laís	Scooby; Paulo André	Arthur	Not eligible	Douglas	Not eligible	Natália	Jessilane	Douglas	Natália	Douglas	Scooby	Evicted (Day 65)									
Vinicius	Jade; Scooby	Arthur	Douglas	Not eligible	Not eligible	Natália	Jessilane	Jessilane	Gustavo	Douglas	Gustavo	Evicted (Day 58)									
Jade	Lucas; Vinicius	Jessilane	Lucas	Head of Household	Not eligible	Head of Household	Jessilane	Douglas	Gustavo	Evicted (Day 51)	Gustavo	Evicted (Day 51)									
Larissa	Not in House				Glass; House	Brunna	Jessilane	Douglas	Evicted (Day 44)		Gustavo	Evicted (Day 44)									
Tiago	Lucas; Jade	Head of Household	Lucas	Not eligible	Not eligible	Natália	Paulo André	Walked (Day 42)													
Brunna	Lucas; Natália	Lucas	Lucas	Not eligible	Not eligible	Natália	Jessilane	Evicted (Day 37)			Gustavo	Evicted (Day 37)									
Bárbara	Natália; Jessilane	Lucas	Not eligible	Douglas	Not eligible	Lucas	Evicted (Day 30)				Gustavo	Evicted (Day 30)									
Maria	Jade; Natália	Arthur	Not eligible	Douglas	Not eligible	Scooby	Ejected (Day 30)														
Naiara	Lucas; Jade	Maria	Not eligible	Paulo André	Evicted (Day 23)						Not eligible	Evicted (Day 23)									
Rodrigo	Scooby; Paulo André	Arthur	Evicted (Day 16)								Gustavo	Evicted (Day 16)									
Luciano	Jade; Natália	Evicted (Day 9)									Eslovênia	Evicted (Day 9)									
Notes	1, 2, 3, 4, 5	6, 7	8, 9, 10, 11		12	13, 14, 15, 16	17, 18, 19	20, 21, 22, 23	24, 25	26, 27, 28	29, 30, 31	32, 33	2, 34, 35	36, 37, 38, 39	40, 41, 42	43	44, 45, 46	47	48	49	50
Nominated for Eviction	Luciano; Naiara; Natália	Jessilane; Natália; Rodrigo	Arthur; Douglas; Naiara		Gustavo & Larissa	Arthur; Bárbara; Natália	Brunna; Gustavo; Paulo André	Arthur; Larissa; Linn	Arthur; Jade; Jessilane	Gustavo; Scooby; Vinicius	Douglas; Eliezer; Laís	Lucas; Paulo André; Scooby	Douglas; Eslovênia; Paulo André	Arthur; Eliezer; Gustavo; Linn	Eliezer; Gustavo; Linn	Gustavo; Natália; Paulo André	Arthur; Douglas; Eliezer; Jessilane	Eliezer; Gustavo; Paulo André	Douglas; Eliezer; Scooby	Arthur; Douglas; Eliezer	Arthur; Douglas; Paulo André
Ejected	(none)					Maria	(none)														
Walked	(none)							Tiago	(none)												
Evicted	Luciano; 49% to evict	Rodrigo; 49% to evict	Naiara; 58% to evict		Gustavo & Larissa; 53% to enter	Bárbara; 86% to evict	Brunna; 76% to evict	Larissa; 89% to evict	Jade; 85% to evict	Vinicius; 56% to evict	Laís; 91% to evict	Lucas; 78% to evict	Eslovênia; 81% to evict	Arthur; 83% to move	Linn; 78% to evict	Natália; 84% to evict	Jessilane; 64% to evict	Gustavo; 82% to evict	Scooby; 56% to evict	Eliezer; 66% to evict	Douglas; 1% to win
Evicted	Luciano; 49% to evict	Rodrigo; 49% to evict	Naiara; 58% to evict		Gustavo & Larissa; 53% to enter	Bárbara; 86% to evict	Brunna; 76% to evict	Larissa; 89% to evict	Jade; 85% to evict	Vinicius; 56% to evict	Laís; 91% to evict	Lucas; 78% to evict	Eslovênia; 81% to evict	Arthur; 83% to move	Linn; 78% to evict	Natália; 84% to evict	Jessilane; 64% to evict	Gustavo; 82% to evict	Scooby; 56% to evict	Eliezer; 66% to evict	Paulo André; 30% to win
Survived	Natália; 35% to evict	Natália; 26% to evict	Douglas; 39% to evict		Gustavo & Larissa; 47% to not enter	Natália; 9% to evict	Gustavo; 22% to evict	Arthur; 6% to evict	Jessilane; 13% to evict	Gustavo; 39% to evict	Douglas; 5% to evict	Scooby; 18% to evict	Douglas; 18% to evict	Gustavo; 11% to move	Eliezer; 16% to evict	Gustavo; 14% to evict	Arthur; 29% to evict	Eliezer; 16% to evict	Eliezer; 42% to evict	Arthur; 21% to evict	Arthur; 69% to win
Survived	Natália; 35% to evict	Natália; 26% to evict	Douglas; 39% to evict		Gustavo & Larissa; 47% to not enter	Natália; 9% to evict	Gustavo; 22% to evict	Arthur; 6% to evict	Jessilane; 13% to evict	Gustavo; 39% to evict	Douglas; 5% to evict	Scooby; 18% to evict	Douglas; 18% to evict	Linn; 6% to move	Eliezer; 16% to evict	Gustavo; 14% to evict	Douglas; 6% to evict	Eliezer; 16% to evict	Eliezer; 42% to evict	Arthur; 21% to evict	Arthur; 69% to win
Survived	Naiara; 16% to evict	Jessilane; 25% to evict	Arthur; 3% to evict		Gustavo & Larissa; 47% to not enter	Arthur; 5% to evict	Paulo André; 2% to evict	Linn; 5% to evict	Arthur; 2% to evict	Scooby; 5% to evict	Eliezer; 4% to evict	Paulo André; 4% to evict	Paulo André; 1% to evict	Linn; 6% to move	Gustavo; 7% to evict	Paulo André; 2% to evict	Douglas; 6% to evict	Paulo André; 2% to evict	Douglas; 2% to evict	Douglas; 13% to evict	Arthur; 69% to win
Survived	Naiara; 16% to evict	Jessilane; 25% to evict	Arthur; 3% to evict		Gustavo & Larissa; 47% to not enter	Arthur; 5% to evict	Paulo André; 2% to evict	Linn; 5% to evict	Arthur; 2% to evict	Scooby; 5% to evict	Eliezer; 4% to evict	Paulo André; 4% to evict	Paulo André; 1% to evict	Eliezer; 1% to move	Gustavo; 7% to evict	Paulo André; 2% to evict	Eliezer; 2% to evict	Paulo André; 2% to evict	Douglas; 2% to evict	Douglas; 13% to evict	Arthur; 69% to win
Votes	30,501,221	120,642,306	147,349,091		10,862,584	105,723,079	91,278,902	90,162,753	698,199,078	73,836,602	157,060,266	51,679,838	49,791,871	134,468,810	83,569,638	33,863,189	407,581,080	99,243,663	154,180,021	278,082,333	751,366,679

=== Notes ===
- ^Note 1 : On Day 2 and 4, respectively, the "Civilians" and "Celebrities" housemates each competed in a pairs competition for immunity. Bárbara & Laís won the civilian competition and immunity for the first nomination, while Arthur & Douglas won the celebrity competition and immunity for the first nomination.
- ^Note 2 : This week, the Power of Immunity winner won immunity for themselves, rather than having to give immunity to someone. They were only told of this fact during Live Nominations.
- ^Note 3 : This week, the HoH's nominee had the power to name an additional nominee. During the nominations, Douglas, as HoH, nominated Naiara, who in turn nominated Luciano.
- ^Note 4 : This week, the housemates had to vote for two different housemates during nominations. The top 2 vote recipients became the House's Nominees.
- ^Note 5 : As Head of Household, Douglas was forced to break the tie between Jade, Natália and Scooby (with seven votes each) to determine the House's two nominees. He nominated Jade and Natália.
- ^Note 6 : As one of the duo winners of the HoH competition, Scooby won immunity for this week and the power to choose one housemate to nominate for eviction on Day 14. He nominated Natália.
- ^Note 7 : This week, Eliezer, who was saved by the Power of Immunity, had the power to name an additional nominee. He nominated Douglas.
- ^Note 8 : This week, the winner of the HoH competition had to choose 4 housemates to draw for different consequences. Jade won the HoH competition and chose Natália, Jessilane, Naiara and Lucas. Natália received immunity for the week, Jessilane automatically became a Have-Not, Naiara was nominated for eviction, and Lucas automatically became a Have.
- ^Note 9 : This week, the Power of Immunity winner won immunity for themselves, along with having the power to give it to someone; if the winner was already immune (Natália) or on the block (Naiara), they would only have the power to give it to someone else.
- ^Note 10 : This week, the Housemates had two rounds of voting that would determine two House Nominees. The first 8 houseguests chosen by a random drawn will vote for the first nominee in a face-to-face vote, while the remaining 9 will cast their vote privately in the Diary Room for the second nominee.
- ^Note 11 : As Head of Household, Jade was forced to break the tie between Lucas and Maria (with two votes each) to determine the House's first nominee. She nominated Lucas.
- ^Note 12 : Gustavo and Larissa entered the Glass House on Day 26, and faced a public vote to find out whether they would join the game or not. They received enough votes to enter and moved into the main house before noms on Day 28. Upon entry, Gustavo & Larissa received immunity for their first week in the main game, and following the house voting, they were told to cast a face-to-face vote on one housemate, as a duo. They decided to vote for Brunna.
- ^Note 13 : This week, the Power of Immunity competition was done in duos, with the winning duo having to decide together who to give immunity to. In addition, the winning duo would learn during nominations that they would have to decide which one of them would also receive immunity. Paulo André & Scooby won the competition and gave immunity to Douglas, while Paulo André was chosen to keep immunity.
- ^Note 15 : This week, the House's nominee and the HoH's nominee, respectively, had the power to name an additional nominee each. During the nominations, the Housemates nominated Natália, who in turn nominated Laís. Jade, as HoH, nominated Arthur, who in turn nominated Bárbara.
- ^Note 16 : On Day 30, Maria was ejected from the house due to violent behaviour towards Natália during the weekly Monday live game.
- ^Note 17 : On Day 33, Brunna answered the Big Phone and was told to immediately nominate one housemate for eviction. She chose Gustavo.
- ^Note 18 : This week, instead of the usual voting, the voting was done in groups. The houseguests were told to split into three groups, with a minimum of two peoples per group. The groups were then told to go to different rooms of the house, and to unanimously agree on one housemate to nominate. The first group (Brunna, Eliezer, Eslovênia, Jade, Laís, Larissa and Vinicius) nominated Jessilane for eviction. The second group (Arthur, Douglas, Gustavo, Paulo André and Scooby) couldn't agree on who to nominate, being torn between Eliezer and Laís, and through a 3–2 vote, Eliezer was nominated for eviction. The third group (Jessilane, Linn, Natália and Tiago) nominated Paulo André for eviction.
- ^Note 19 : Week 5 featured a double veto, with all 4 nominees competing for a chance to escape the block. The two winners escaped the block and received one year of unlimited McDonald's orders, leaving the other two to face Brazil's vote alongside the HoH's nominee.
- ^Note 20 : Week 6's HoH competition, was a pairs endurance competition. The winning duo of the HoH competition had to decide among themselves who would become HoH and who would receive immunity and have their Diary Room vote count as two. Paulo André & Scooby won the competition and decided that Paulo André would become the HoH. Additionally, the first duo eliminated from the HoH endurance competition were nominated for eviction. Arthur & Lucas were the first to leave and were automatically nominated for eviction.
- ^Note 21 : On Day 42, Tiago pressed the Withdrawn Button and left the House.
- ^Note 22 : This week, the voting was done in duos, with the same duos from the HoH competition going to the Diary Room together to cast one vote. As one of the duo winners of the HoH competition, Scooby voted by himself and had his vote count as two. Larissa did not participate in the competition after breaking her toe, while Tiago was left with no duo and also didn’t compete, therefore the two were slated to become a duo for the voting. However, with Tiago walking from the game a few hours before the voting, Larissa was left to vote by herself.
- ^Note 23 : As Head of Household, Paulo André was forced to break the tie between Douglas and Larissa (with three votes each). He nominated Larissa.
- ^Note 24 : As the runner-up of the HoH competition, Douglas won immunity for this week. As third place, Eliezer automatically became a Have for this week.
- ^Note 25 : On Day 48, Jade answered the Big Phone and was automatically nominated for eviction and instructed to nominate an additional housemante. She chose Arthur.
- ^Note 26 : The Head of Household competition was an endurance challenge with a time limit of 24 hours, with the public being told beforehand the winner would be chosen by random draw if it wasn't over by then. Lucas, Natália and Paulo André were still there at the deadline, so all of them were awarded the prize money the winner would get, and Lucas was ultimately chosen as the winner.
- ^Note 27 : As the housemate vetoed from competing in the HoH by Scooby, the previous HoH, Eliezer had the power to nominate someone for eviction on Sunday, with the exception of Scooby himself. He nominated Gustavo.
- ^Note 28 : This week, the HoH competition veto's nominee had the power to name an additional nominee. During the nominations, Eliezer, as vetoed from the HoH competition, nominated Gustavo, who in turn nominated Vinicius.
- ^Note 29 : On Week 9, the first 8 eliminated housemates (with the exception of Maria and Tiago) were brought back and were initially told to vote someone out among them. Naiara was chosen and was exempt from voting. They were then told to vote to nominate one of the 4 housemates who placed the lowest in the HoH competition (Eslovênia, Gustavo, Linn and Natália). Gustavo was nominated for eviction by a 6–1–0–0 vote, over Eslovênia, Linn and Natália, respectively.
- ^Note 30 : As the winning duo of the HoH competition, Arthur and Lucas had to agree on which one of them would become the HoH and who would receive a cash prize. They decided that Arthur would be the HoH.
- ^Note 31 : This week, the HoH's nominee had the power to name an additional nominee. During the nominations, Arthur, as HoH, nominated Laís, who in turn nominated Douglas.
- ^Note 32 : This week, the top 2 vote recipients became the House's Nominees.
- ^Note 33 : This week, the House’s first nominee (nominated most voted from the house) had the power to name an additional nominee. During the nominations, most of the Housemates nominated Lucas, who in turn nominated Eliezer.
- ^Note 34 : Before making his official nomination, Gustavo, the HoH, was required to nominate one of the two housemates who had received the Monster Punishment (Arthur and Paulo André). He nominated Paulo André.
- ^Note 35 : No Power of Veto competition was held this week.
- ^Note 36 : This round was a fake eviction. Instead of voting to evict, the public would vote for which houseguest would temporarily leave the house and return on Thursday.
- ^Note 37 : On Day 77, the HoH's nominee had the power to name an additional nominee. During the nominations, Paulo André, as HoH, nominated Linn, who in turn nominated Gustavo.
- ^Note 38 : Unbeknownst to the housemates, the housemate positioned at station 6 of the extra round on this week's HoH competition would win the power to instantly nominate a housemate for eviction. Jessilane was that housemate and nominated Arthur.
- ^Note 39 : As Head of Household, Paulo André was forced to break the tie between Eliezer and Scooby (with four votes each). He nominated Eliezer.
- ^Note 40 : This week features the last Power of Immunity competition of this season.
- ^Note 41 : This round, the voting houseguests cast their vote to save one housemate during nominations. The least vote recipient became the House's Nominee.
- ^Note 42 : On Day 82, the House's nominee had the power to name an additional nominee. During the nominations, the Housemates nominated Eliezer, who in turn nominated Gustavo.
- ^Note 43 : This round, the housemate chosen to reveal their vote through of the Snitch, had the power to nominate someone for eviction. Natália was chosen by Paulo André, that was drawn, to reveal his vote and nominated Gustavo.
- ^Note 44 : This round, Gustavo, the HoH, had to nominate for two different housemates during nominations. He nominated Jessilane and Eliezer.
- ^Note 45 : As Head of Household, Gustavo was forced to break the tie between Arthur and Douglas (with three votes each). He nominated Arthur.
- ^Note 46 : On Day 89, the House's nominee had the power to name an additional nominee. During the nominations, the Housemates nominated Arthur, who in turn nominated Douglas.
- ^Note 47 : On Day 91, the House's nominee had the power to name an additional nominee. During the nominations, the Housemates nominated Gustavo, who in turn nominated Paulo André.
- ^Note 48 : On Day 93, the last place of the HoH competition was nominated for eviction. Douglas was the last place of the competition and was automatically nominated for eviction.
- ^Note 49 : Paulo André won the final competition, winning immunity for the final eviction and granting his place in the Finale. Arthur, Douglas and Eliezer were automatically nominated for eviction by default.
- ^Note 50 : For the final, the public will vote for the housemate they want to win Big Brother Brasil 22.

=== Have and Have-Nots ===
	Week 1	Week 2^{1}	Week 3	Week 4	Week 5	Week 6	Week 7	Week 8	Week 9	Week 10^{2}	Week 11		Week 12		Week 13		Week 14	
	Week 1	Week 2^{1}	Week 3	Week 4	Week 5	Week 6	Week 7	Week 8	Week 9	Week 10^{2}	Day 74^{3}	Day 77^{4}	Day 81	Day 84^{5}	Day 88	Day 91	Day 93	Day 96
Arthur	Have-Not	Have	Have-Not	Have-Not	Have	Have	Have	Have-Not	Have	Have-Not	Have-Not	Have-Not	Have	Have-Not	Have	Have-Not	Have	Have
Paulo André	Have	Have-Not	Have-Not	Have	Have-Not	Have	Have	Have-Not	Have	Have-Not	Have-Not	Have-Not	Have-Not	Have-Not	Have-Not	Have	Have	Have
Douglas	Have	Have	Have-Not	Have-Not	Have	Have	Have	Have-Not	Have	Have-Not	Have	Have-Not	Have	Have-Not	Have-Not	Have-Not	Have-Not	Have
Eliezer	Have-Not	Have-Not	Have	Have-Not	Have-Not	Have-Not	Have	Have-Not	Have-Not	Have-Not	Have-Not	Have-Not	Have-Not	Have	Have-Not	Have-Not	Have-Not	Have
Scooby	Have	Have	Have-Not	Have	Have-Not	Have	Have	Have-Not	Have	Have-Not	Have-Not	Have-Not	Have	Have-Not	Have	Have	Have-Not	
Gustavo				Have-Not	Have-Not	Have	Have-Not	Have-Not	Have-Not	Have-Not	Have	Have-Not	Have	Have-Not	Have	Have-Not		
Jessilane	Have-Not	Have-Not	Have-Not	Have-Not	Have-Not	Have-Not	Have-Not	Have	Have-Not	Have	Have-Not	Have-Not	Have-Not	Have	Have-Not			
Natália	Have-Not	Have-Not	Have-Not	Have-Not	Have	Have-Not	Have-Not	Have	Have-Not	Have	Have-Not	Have-Not	Have-Not	Have-Not				
Linn	Have-Not	Have	Have-Not	Have-Not	Have	Have-Not	Have-Not	Have	Have-Not	Have	Have-Not	Have-Not	Have-Not					
Eslovênia	Have-Not	Have-Not	Have-Not	Have-Not	Have	Have-Not	Have-Not	Have	Have-Not	Have-Not	Have-Not							
Lucas	Have	Have-Not	Have	Have-Not	Have	Have-Not	Have-Not	Have	Have	Have-Not								
Laís	Have-Not	Have-Not	Have	Have	Have-Not	Have-Not	Have-Not	Have-Not	Have-Not									
Vinicius	Have-Not	Have-Not	Have	Have-Not	Have-Not	Have-Not	Have-Not	Have-Not										
Jade	Have-Not	Have-Not	Have	Have	Have-Not	Have	Have											
Larissa				Have-Not	Have-Not	Have-Not												
Tiago	Have	Have	Have-Not	Have	Have-Not	Have-Not												
Brunna	Have-Not	Have-Not	Have-Not	Have-Not	Have-Not													
Bárbara	Have-Not	Have-Not	Have	Have														
Maria	Have-Not	Have-Not	Have-Not	Have-Not														
Naiara	Have-Not	Have-Not	Have-Not															
Rodrigo	Have	Have-Not																
Luciano	Have																	

- ^Note 1 : On week 2, Jade became a have-not after losing the last place tie-breaker to Natália and Vinicius in the Power of Immunity competition.
- ^Note 2 : On week 10, Eslovênia and Lucas became have-nots after Paulo André picked them for the Monster Punishment.
- ^Note 3 : On day 75, Paulo André became have-not after Jessilane picked him for the Monster Punishment.
- ^Note 4 : On day 81, the all housemates become have-nots until the end of the week, after Arthur, as the most voted housemate to move in the Fake Eviction, picked punished everyone in the house used a card in the secret room.
- ^Note 5 : On day 85, Natália became have-not after Jessilane picked her during the weekly Monday live game.

== Ratings and reception ==
=== Brazilian ratings ===
All numbers are in points and provided by Kantar Ibope Media.

Week	First air date	Last air date	Timeslot (BRT)	Daily SP viewers (in points)							SP viewers (in points)	BR viewers (in points)	Ref.
Week	First air date	Last air date	Timeslot (BRT)	Mon	Tue	Wed	Thu	Fri	Sat	Sun	SP viewers (in points)	BR viewers (in points)	Ref.
1	January 17, 2022	January 23, 2022	Monday to Saturday; 10:30 p.m. Sunday; 11:30 p.m.	27.9									
2	January 24, 2022	January 30, 2022	Monday to Saturday; 10:30 p.m. Sunday; 11:30 p.m.										
3	January 31, 2022	February 6, 2022	Monday to Saturday; 10:30 p.m. Sunday; 11:30 p.m.										

- In 2022, each point represents 258.821 households in 15 market cities in Brazil (74.666 households in São Paulo).
