= Cuité =

- Municipality
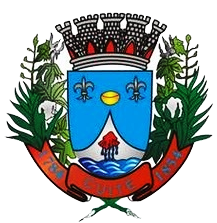
- Flag Coat of arms

- Location in Brazil
- Coordinates: 6°29′06″S 36°09′25″W
- Country: Brazil
- Region: Northeast
- State: Paraíba
- Mesoregion: Agreste Paraibano

Population (2020)
  - Total: 20,334
- Time zone: UTC−3 (BRT)

Cuité (Central northeastern portuguese pronunciation: [kujˈtɛ]) is a municipality in the state of Paraíba in the Northeast Region of Brazil.

== See also ==
- List of municipalities in Paraíba
