= Alessandro Campos =

Brazilian television presenter, singer and Catholic priest

Padre Alessandro Campos

Personal life
- Born: Alessandro Correa de Campos; 17 February 1982 (age 44) Guaratinguetá, São Paulo, Brazil

Religious life
- Religion: Roman Catholicism
- Ordination: 27 January 2007

Military service
- Rank: Priest

Padre Alessandro Campos
- Genres: Contemporary Catholic liturgical music, Contemporary Christian music
- Occupation: singer
- Instrument: Voice
- Years active: 2007–present

Alessandro Correa de Campos (17 February 1982) is a Catholic priest, singer and Brazilian television presenter. He is known by the nickname of "Padre Sertanejo", for always using of the country music to pass his religious messages.

In addition to performing shows around the country, Alessandro Campos also presents television and radio programs. He already passed through TV Aparecida, Redevida, TV Gazeta, and RedeTV!, where it remained in the air for only two months.

== Biography ==
=== Childhood ===
Alessandro always tells to the press that he discovered his sacerdotal vocation in childhood, around the seven years of age. He claims that he used to play masses and used currant juice and biscuits to simulate the celebration of the Eucharist.

To the ten years, Campos turned acolyte and was sent to the seminary when he was thirteen.

=== Ordination ===
Campos studied theology in the Faculty of Theology of Tabor, owned by the Diocese of Mogi das Cruzes. He was ordained a priest on 27 January 2007, at the age of 27, in Resende, in the south of the state of Rio de Janeiro.

He was connected to the Military Archdiocese, where he remained until 2011. In the military milieu, passed by Military Academy of the Agulhas Negras and was lieutenant and chaplain of the Military College of Brasília. There, he inserted sertaneja music in his masses.

In 2014, he returned to the Diocese of Mogi das Cruzes.

The local bishop authorizes him to do shows in Brazil, as well as presenting radio and television programs. Thus, Alessandro acts as a kind of "missionary priest".

=== Music ===
Father Alessandro Campos is known for using the elements of sertaneja music. Wherever he goes, he always appears in cowboy outfits amid traditional priestly attire. Alessandro sang in the church still in the time of coroinha and, already priest, was encouraged to enter the musical career by the priests of his old parish.

His first album was released in 2011, but the success came on the next album, "O que é que eu sou sem Jesus?" which hit stores in 2014. The amount of 900,000 albums sold made him stand in front of artists like Ivete Sangalo and Roberto Carlos. In this way, he appeared in the list of 50 sold albums of the world, by the International Federation of the Phonographic Industry.

=== Television ===
The priest premiered on Aparecida TV where he commanded "Aparecida Sertaneja" for two years. In the program, Alessandro sang and received guests of the genre. He left command of the program in 2015.

In 2016, he transferred to Redevida. At the São José do Rio Preto station, he presented the program "Família Sertaneja", later renamed "Viva a Vida". He also accumulated a role in Rede Século 21, in charge of the program "Vem com Fé". During the year 2017, he presented the "Festa Sertaneja" on TV Gazeta. In November 2018 he was hired by RedeTV! and on 11 February 2019 began presenting a program that bears his name.

== Controversies ==
In 2018, Father Alessandro Campos was accused of assaulting elderly fans, television officials (Gazeta and Aparecida) and viewers and sporting a luxury living standard with imported cars, expensive clothes and jewelry (which do not fit a priestly life). In his defense, the priest alleged that he did not assault anyone and that he did not vow of poverty.

Despite the economic crisis, the municipalities of Palmeira dos Índios (AL) and Santo Antonio de Jesus (BA) hired Father Alessandro Campos to perform concerts with payoffs ranging from R$120,000 to R$135,000. These high payments are due to the indebtedness of the priest, who even had rents of concerts pawned by the justice for account of debts.

According to the website "Notícias da TV", Alessandro Campos charges admission of the audience (composed mainly of elderly) who wants to watch his television program audience. The resources collected with this practice, unusual in Brazilian television, would all be destined for the priest (who in turn does not disclose the fate and amount of value collected). The payment of the ticket does not allow the public any means of interaction with Campos, which generated several complaints in the site Reclame Aqui.

== Discography ==
- O homem decepciona, Jesus Cristo jamais (2011)
- O que é que eu sou sem Jesus? (2014)
- Quando Deus quer, ninguém segura – Ao Vivo (2015)
- Deus nos fez para sermos felizes (2016)
- Deus sempre faz o melhor (2018)
