= A Grande Conquista 1 =

Season of television series

- Season 1
- Hosted by: Mariana Rios
- No. of days: 75
- No. of contestants: 20
- Winner: Thiago Servo
- Runner-up: Gabriel Roza
- Companion show: O Grande React
- No. of episodes: 74

Release
- Original network: RecordTV
- Original release: May 8 – July 20, 2023

Additional information
- Filming dates: May 7 – July 20, 2023

Season chronology
- Next → Season 2

A Grande Conquista 1 (Note: (formerly called as A Grande Conquista)) was the first season of the Brazilian reality television series A Grande Conquista, which premiered on Monday, May 8, 2023, at 10:30/9:30 p.m. (BRT/AMT) on RecordTV, following a special preview episode that aired on May 2. Under the direction of Rodrigo Carelli, the show was commanded by Lucas Selfie on digital platforms and hosted for the first and only time by Mariana Rios, she who makes her debut as the host of the series.

On July 20, 2023, singer Thiago Servo won the competition with 35.60% of the public vote over digital influencer Gabriel Roza (24.86%), digital influencer Natália Deodato (21.59%) and actress Gyselle Soares (17.95%).

== Format ==
=== Stage 1 ===
Before the premiere, 16 celebrities compete in a public vote for the first 10 spots (5 men and 5 women) in the Mansion. The 6 who receive the fewest votes move into the Villa to compete with another 64 candidates (including both celebrities and civilians) for the remaining 10 spots, bringing the total number of contestants up to 20.

Men
Candidate	Occupation	Result	Ref.
Alexandre Suita	Digital influencer	Selected	
Bruno Camargo	Model	Selected	
Bruno Tálamo	Journalist	Selected	
Daniel Toko	Reporter	Selected	
Ricardo Villardo	Actor	Selected	
Glauco Marciano	Fitness model	Not Selected	
MC M10	Singer	Not Selected	
Thiago Servo	Singer	Not Selected	

Women
Candidate	Occupation	Result	Ref.
Ana Paula Almeida	TV host	Selected	
Faby Monarca	Media personality	Selected	
Giulia Garcia	Actress	Selected	
Stephanie Gomes	Digital influencer	Selected	
Victoria Macan	DJ	Selected	
Carolina Lekker	Model	Not Selected	
Érika Coimbra	Former volleyball player	Not Selected	
Kelly Santos	Former basketball player	Not Selected	

=== Stage 2 ===
In the Villa, the 70 candidates live in three houses (starting with 32 in the Orange house, 22 in the Blue house and 16 in the Green house), having to share beds and limited supplies for 12 days, while facing a series of challenges and mass evictions. The last 20 to survive in the Villa compete in the final challenge, in which the public decides whether the winner secures a place in the next stage of the game. Then, the remaining candidates face the final public vote for the last spots in the Mansion.

On May 7, 2023, 5 celebrities were announced in advance: Nathan Camargo, Hulk Magrelo, Blade, Fernanda Medrado and Natália Deodato. While a few others were also spotted during the preview, the full lineup was only revealed during the series premiere.

No.	Candidate	Type	Age	Hometown	Occupation	Week 1						
No.	Candidate	Type	Age	Hometown	Occupation	Day 4	Day 6		Day 8	Day 10	Day 11	Day 12
No.	Candidate	Type	Age	Hometown	Occupation	Day 4	Round 1	Round 2	Day 8	Day 10	Day 11	Day 12
45	Murilo Dias	Celebrity	32	Brazlândia	Digital influencer	Exempt	Not eligible	08.36%	12.79%	06.60%	72.02%	Selected
21	Gabriel Roza	Celebrity	23	Vassouras	Digital influencer	Saved	Not eligible	24.15%	Exempt	15.14%	Not eligible	14.02%
56	Sandra Melquiades	Civilian	50	Maceió	Retired	Exempt	Not eligible	Exempt	Saved	18.46%	Not eligible	13.46%
47	Natália Deodato	Celebrity	23	Sabará	Digital influencer	Saved	Not eligible	Exempt	26.48%	18.14%	Not eligible	10.12%
66	Thiago Servo	Celebrity	37	Maringá	Singer	Owner	Lukinhas	Owner	Owner	Owner	Not eligible	09.78%
25	Gyselle Soares	Celebrity	39	Teresina	Actress	14.37%	Not eligible	Exempt	Saved	04.82%	Not eligible	07.97%
62	Tiago Dionisio	Celebrity	29	Parnamirim	Comedian	Exempt	Not eligible	09.77%	14.29%	07.43%	Not eligible	07.36%
42	Fernanda Medrado	Celebrity	30	Guarulhos	Singer	Exempt	Not eligible	Exempt	Saved	Saved	Not eligible	06.50%
18	Erick Ricarte	Celebrity	31	Aracaju	Journalist	Exempt	Not eligible	03.33%	Exempt	04.07%	Not eligible	04.58%
31	Janielly Nogueira	Civilian	33	Jaboatão	Law student	Saved	Not eligible	09.46%	Exempt	Exempt	Not eligible	04.32%
14	Dicesar Ferreira	Celebrity	57	Sertanópolis	Make-up artist	Exempt	Not eligible	Exempt	Exempt	04.69%	Owner	04.06%
10	Camilla Uckers	Celebrity	31	Fortaleza	Digital influencer	15.35%	Not eligible	Exempt	Saved	03.64%	Not eligible	03.38%
02	Antônio Rafaski	Celebrity	29	Vila Velha	Actor	11.82%	Not eligible	Saved	09.88%	Exempt	Not eligible	03.36%
65	Glauco Marciano	Celebrity	29	São Paulo	Fitness model	Owner	63.23%	Owner	Owner	Owner	Not eligible	03.33%
48	Niick Donato	Civilian	28	Salvador	Saleswoman	Exempt	Not eligible	Exempt	Saved	Saved	Not eligible	02.26%
37	Lary Bottino	Celebrity	25	Rio de Janeiro	Digital influencer	Exempt	Not eligible	Exempt	Exempt	Saved	Not eligible	01.76%
12	Davi Oliveira	Civilian	41	Salvador	Security guard	Saved	Not eligible	Saved	Saved	Exempt	Not eligible	01.19%
67	Kelly Santos	Celebrity	43	São Paulo	Former basketball player	Owner	Ronaldo	Owner	Owner	Owner	Not eligible	00.89%
38	Layssa Souza	Celebrity	25	Caruaru	Digital influencer	Exempt	Not eligible	Saved	Exempt	Exempt	Not eligible	00.87%
27	Hulk Magrelo	Celebrity	45	Carapicuíba	Actor	Exempt	Not eligible	Exempt	Exempt	Exempt	Not eligible	00.79%
52	Rayana Diniz	Civilian	33	Lagoa Dourada	Educator	09.01%	Not eligible	08.28%	Exempt	03.45%		
68	MC M10	Celebrity	28	Santo André	Singer	Exempt	Not eligible	Saved	Exempt	03.20%		
63	Vic Silva	Civilian	25	Rio de Janeiro	Digital influencer	Exempt	Not eligible	Exempt	Exempt	02.89%		
69	Érika Coimbra	Celebrity	42	Belo Horizonte	Former volleyball player	Exempt	Not eligible	Exempt	Exempt	02.01%		
24	Gus Saran	Civilian	27	Ribeirão Preto	Dance teacher	Exempt	Not eligible	01.71%	Exempt	01.63%		
05	Blade	Celebrity	42	São Paulo	Dancer & comedian	Saved	Not eligible	Saved	Exempt	01.14%		
11	Cleyton Mendes	Civilian	30	Poá	Writer	Saved	Not eligible	Saved	Saved	01.09%		
60	Tati Bambolê	Civilian	31	São Paulo	Dancer	Saved	Not eligible	02.26%	Exempt	01.08%		
13	Day Oliveira	Civilian	33	Morrinhos	Digital influencer	Exempt	Not eligible	Saved	Exempt	00.52%		
70	Carolina Lekker	Celebrity	25	Juiz de Fora	Model	Exempt	Not eligible	Exempt	08.28%			
41	Maria Oliveira	Civilian	26	São João de Meriti	Professional fighter	Saved	Not eligible	10.93%	07.90%			
49	Marcos Oliver	Celebrity	46	Taubaté	Actor	07.12%	Not eligible	06.68%	06.90%			
28	Igor Cavallo	Civilian	43	São Paulo	Jiu-jitsu fighter	Exempt	Not eligible	04.87%	06.75%			
57	Stéphanie Souza	Civilian	27	São Leopoldo	Communicator	Saved	Not eligible	Saved	02.45%			
19	Fagner Sousa	Celebrity	34	Campinas	DJ & model	04.97%	Not eligible	Saved	01.34%			
44	Monsueto	Celebrity	51	Rio de Janeiro	Dancer	Exempt	Not eligible	Saved	01.01%			
53	Ronaldo Moura	Celebrity	32	São Paulo	Actor & model	Exempt	19.62%	Exempt	00.92%			
43	Mirian Carter	Civilian	44	Itanhém	Writer	Exempt	Not eligible	Exempt	00.69%			
33	Jaqueline Moderna	Civilian	38	São Paulo	Sales promoter	Exempt	Not eligible	Exempt	00.32%			
58	Tácito Cury	Civilian	44	São Paulo	Pastry chef	Exempt	Not eligible	01.41%				
01	Aícha Mubobo	Civilian	22	Luanda, Angola	Model	Exempt	Not eligible	01.36%				
04	Babi Cris	Civilian	35	São Paulo	Plus size model	Exempt	Not eligible	01.31%				
26	Hagda Kerolayne	Celebrity	26	Cristino Castro	Digital influencer	Exempt	Not eligible	01.27%				
46	Nathan Camargo	Celebrity	28	São Paulo	Digital influencer	Exempt	Not eligible	01.19%				
35	Jhon Falcão	Celebrity	33	Brumado	Singer & comedian	Exempt	Not eligible	00.97%				
20	Francis Souza	Civilian	37	Presidente Prudente	Actor	Exempt	Not eligible	00.93%				
51	Rafa Sant	Civilian	26	Mogi das Cruzes	Digital influencer	Exempt	Not eligible	00.93%				
29	Carol Imoniana	Civilian	33	São Paulo	Physiotherapist	Exempt	Not eligible	00.83%				
40	Lukinhas	Civilian	37	Taboão da Serra	Driver & street vendor	Exempt	17.15%					
16	Elisa Guerreira	Civilian	40	Estância	Nursing technique	Saved	Removed					
54	Yanne Anttunes	Civilian	36	Matupá	Trade representative	03.55%						
61	Thayra Machado	Civilian	27	Franca	Dental student	03.51%						
15	Douglas Martins	Civilian	33	São Paulo	Dancer	03.04%						
23	Gui Dams	Civilian	25	Florianópolis	Personal trainer	02.80%						
03	Artur Frances	Civilian	43	São Paulo	Mixologist	02.53%						
22	Gabriel Sequeira	Celebrity	40	Eng. Paulo de Frontin	Police officer & model	02.49%						
36	Kaline França	Civilian	32	São Paulo	Radio announcer	02.32%						
64	Will Barba	Civilian	46	São Paulo	Barber	02.12%						
39	Leo Rodriguez	Celebrity	34	Descalvado	Singer	01.92%						
55	Leandro Ryco	Civilian	57	Volta Redonda	Businessman	01.91%						
09	MC Mello	Celebrity	20	Guarulhos	Singer	01.90%						
08	Carlos Câmara	Civilian	51	Rio de Janeiro	Street sweeper	01.63%						
59	Tailane Peixoto	Civilian	38	Porto Alegre	Digital influencer	01.45%						
32	Jaqueline Santos	Celebrity	27	Oliveira	Actress & comedian	01.40%						
17	Ellie	Civilian	27	São Paulo	Model	01.08%						
30	Ítalo Coutinho	Celebrity	50	Maceió	Singer	01.00%						
06	Jemilly Brenda	Civilian	30	São Paulo	Nightclub manager	00.84%						
50	Priscila Parizotto	Civilian	50	São Paulo	Housewife	00.71%						
07	Fernando Bueno	Civilian	29	São Bernardo do Campo	Backoffice	00.68%						
34	Jeferson Sousa	Civilian	51	São Paulo	Merchant	00.48%						

=== Stage 3 ===
The 20 selected contestants move into the Mansion on week 2. Each week, two contestants become the Mansion's owners and delegate the weekly tasks, while three contestants are voted into the Risk Zone (the Owners' nominee, the Secret vote nominee between the two Owners and the Mansion's face-to-face vote nominee among all eligible contestants), where they compete in the Safety challenge to escape eviction.

The Safety winner is exempt from nominations, however, they must replace themselves with another contestant of their choice in order to determine that week's set of nominees who would face the public vote.

== Contestants ==
Below is the cast of 20 official contestants for this season, with the occupations listed by the official show website and their respective ages at the start of filming.

Contestant	Type	Age	Hometown	Occupation	Stage 2		Stage 3		Status	Finish
Contestant	Type	Age	Hometown	Occupation	Entered	Exited	Entered	Exited	Status	Finish
Bruno Camargo	Celebrity	35	São Paulo	Model	Day 1	Day 12	Day 12	Day 19	Eliminated 1st on May 25, 2023	20th
Stephanie Gomes	Celebrity	23	Rio de Janeiro	Digital influencer	Day 1	Day 12	Day 12	Day 26	Eliminated 2nd on June 1, 2023	19th
Erick Ricarte	Celebrity	31	Aracaju	Journalist	Day 1	Day 12	Day 12	Day 33	Eliminated 3rd on June 8, 2023	18th
Faby Monarca	Celebrity	44	São Paulo	Media personality	Day 1	Day 12	Day 12	Day 34	Walked on June 9, 2023	17th
Tiago Dionisio	Celebrity	29	Parnamirim	Comedian	Day 1	Day 12	Day 12	Day 40	Eliminated 4th on June 15, 2023	16th
Ana Paula Almeida	Celebrity	46	Rio de Janeiro	TV host	Day 1	Day 12	Day 12	Day 46	Eliminated 5th on June 21, 2023	15th
Bruno Tálamo	Celebrity	34	São Paulo	Journalist	Day 1	Day 12	Day 12	Day 47	Eliminated 6th on June 22, 2023	14th
Fernanda Medrado	Celebrity	30	Guarulhos	Singer	Day 1	Day 12	Day 12	Day 53	Eliminated 7th on June 28, 2023	13th
Janielly Nogueira	Civilian	33	Jaboatão	Law student	Day 1	Day 12	Day 12	Day 54	Eliminated 8th on June 29, 2023	12th
Victoria Macan	Celebrity	26	São Francisco de Paula	DJ	Day 1	Day 12	Day 12	Day 61	Eliminated 9th on July 6, 2023	11th
Murilo Dias	Celebrity	32	Brazlândia	Digital influencer	Day 1	Day 12	Day 12	Day 67	Eliminated 10th on July 12, 2023	10th
Giulia Garcia	Celebrity	19	São Paulo	Actress	Day 1	Day 12	Day 12	Day 68	Eliminated 11th on July 13, 2023	9th
Ricardo Villardo	Celebrity	35	Rio de Janeiro	Actor	Day 1	Day 12	Day 12	Day 70	Eliminated 12th on July 15, 2023	8th
Daniel Toko	Celebrity	34	São Bernardo do Campo	Reporter	Day 1	Day 12	Day 12	Day 70	Eliminated 13th on July 15, 2023	7th
Sandra Melquiades	Civilian	50	Maceió	Retired	Day 1	Day 12	Day 12	Day 72	Eliminated 14th on July 17, 2023	6th
Alexandre Suita	Celebrity	37	Quirinópolis	Digital influencer	Day 1	Day 12	Day 12	Day 73	Eliminated 15th on July 18, 2023	5th
Gyselle Soares	Celebrity	39	Teresina	Actress	Day 1	Day 12	Day 12	Day 75	Fourth place on July 20, 2023	4th
Natália Deodato	Celebrity	23	Sabará	Digital influencer	Day 1	Day 12	Day 12	Day 75	Third place on July 20, 2023	3rd
Gabriel Roza	Celebrity	23	Vassouras	Digital influencer	Day 1	Day 12	Day 12	Day 75	Runner-up on July 20, 2023	2nd
Thiago Servo	Celebrity	37	Maringá	Singer	Day 1	Day 12	Day 12	Day 75	Winner on July 20, 2023	1st

== Future Appearances ==
In 2023, Erick Ricarte appeared in A Fazenda 15, he entered in the Warehouse where the public voted for four contestants to move into the main house, he didn't receive enough votes to enter in the game.

In 2025, Natália Deodato appeared on De Férias com o Ex Caribe as original cast member.

In 2025, Victoria Macan also appeared on De Férias com o Ex Caribe as an ex.

== The game ==
=== Owner selection's results ===
	Week 2	Week 3	Week 4	Week 5	Week 6	Week 7	Week 8	Week 9	Week 10
Candidates	Ana Paula; Natália	Ricardo; Thiago S.	All contestants	Alexandre; Gyselle	Daniel; Natália	Thiago S. Victoria	Gabriel; Natália; Victoria	All contestants	Gyselle; Natália
Thiago S.	Ana Paula	Nominated	Nominated	Not eligible	Not eligible	Nominated	Not eligible	Nominated	Not eligible
Gabriel	Natália	Thiago S.	Nominated	Not eligible	Not eligible	Not eligible	Nominated	Nominated	Not eligible
Natália	Nominated	Ricardo	Nominated	Not eligible	Nominated	Not eligible	Nominated	Nominated	Nominated
Gyselle	Natália	Thiago S.	Nominated	Nominated	Not eligible	Not eligible	Not eligible	Nominated	Nominated
Alexandre	Ana Paula	Ricardo	Nominated	Nominated	Not eligible	Not eligible	Not eligible	Nominated	Not eligible
Sandra	Natália	Thiago S.	Nominated	Not eligible	Not eligible	Not eligible	Not eligible	Nominated	Not eligible
Daniel	Natália	Thiago S.	Nominated	Not eligible	Nominated	Not eligible	Not eligible	Nominated	Not eligible
Ricardo	Natália	Nominated	Nominated	Not eligible	Not eligible	Not eligible	Not eligible	Nominated	Not eligible
Giulia	Ana Paula	Ricardo	Nominated	Not eligible	Not eligible	Not eligible	Not eligible	Nominated	
Murilo	Natália	Thiago S.	Nominated	Not eligible	Not eligible	Not eligible	Not eligible	Nominated	
Victoria	Natália	Ricardo	Nominated	Not eligible	Not eligible	Nominated	Nominated		
Janielly	Natália	Thiago S.	Nominated	Not eligible	Not eligible	Not eligible			
Medrado	Natália	Thiago S.	Nominated	Not eligible	Not eligible	Not eligible			
Bruno T.	Ana Paula	Thiago S.	Nominated	Not eligible	Not eligible				
Ana Paula	Nominated	Thiago S.	Nominated	Not eligible	Not eligible				
Tiago D.	Natália	Thiago S.	Nominated	Not eligible					
Faby	Ana Paula	Thiago S.	Nominated	Not eligible					
Erick	Ana Paula	Thiago S.	Nominated						
Stephanie	Ana Paula	Thiago S.							
Bruno C.	Ana Paula								
First owner	Natália; 10 of 18 votes to elect	Thiago S. 13 of 17 votes to elect	Ricardo; Won the challenge	Alexandre; Won the challenge	Natália; Won the challenge	Victoria; Won the challenge	Victoria; Won the challenge	Giulia; Won the challenge	Natália; Won the challenge
Second owner	Sandra; Natália's choice to elect	Erick; Thiago S.'s choice to elect	Erick; Won the challenge	Bruno T. Alexandre's choice to elect	Janielly; Natália's choice to elect	Alexandre; Victoria's choice to elect	Murilo; Victoria's choice to elect	Ricardo; Giulia's choice to elect	Sandra; Natália's choice to elect

=== Tasks ===
	Week 2	Week 3	Week 4	Week 5	Week 6	Week 7	Week 8	Week 9	Week 10
Mansion owners	Natália; Sandra	Thiago S. Erick	Ricardo; Erick	Alexandre; Bruno T.	Natália; Janielly	Victoria; Alexandre	Victoria; Murilo	Giulia; Ricardo	Natália; Sandra
Room guests	Ana Paula; Janielly; Medrado	Bruno T. Faby; Tiago D.	Giulia; Thiago S. Victoria	Daniel; Gabriel; Gyselle	Medrado; Murilo; Sandra	Gabriel; Giulia; Murilo	Daniel; Giulia; Ricardo	Daniel; ~~Murilo~~; Natália	Alexandre; Gabriel; Ricardo
Kitchen	Faby; Murilo	Alexandre; Murilo	Ana Paula; Medrado	Daniel; Medrado	~~Ana Paula~~; Bruno T.	Gyselle; Janielly	Alexandre; Gyselle	Gyselle; Sandra	Daniel; Ricardo
Internal cleaning	Gyselle; Ricardo	Janielly; Sandra	Gabriel; Tiago D.	Ricardo; Sandra	Gabriel; Thiago S.	~~Medrado~~; Natália	Natália; Thiago S.	Gabriel; Thiago S.	Gyselle; Thiago S.
External cleaning	Bruno T. Erick	Giulia; Victoria	Bruno T. Natália	Giulia; Medrado	Giulia; Victoria	Daniel; Sandra	Giulia; Ricardo	Daniel; ~~Murilo~~	Alexandre; Gabriel

=== Voting history ===
	Week 2	Week 3	Week 4	Week 5	Week 6		Week 7		Week 8	Week 9		Week 10			Week 11
	Week 2	Week 3	Week 4	Week 5	Day 45	Day 46	Day 52	Day 53	Week 8	Day 66	Day 67	Day 69	Day 71	Day 72	Finale
Mansion owners	Natália; Sandra	Thiago S. Erick	Ricardo; Erick	Alexandre; Bruno T.	Natália; Janielly	(none)	Victoria; Alexandre	(none)	Victoria; Murilo	Giulia; Ricardo	(none)	Natália; Sandra	(none)		(none)
Nominated (Owners)	Bruno T.	Faby	Tiago D.	Murilo	Ana Paula	(none)	Daniel	(none)	Sandra	Sandra	(none)	Thiago S.	(none)		(none)
Nominated (Secret vote)	Natália	Erick	Erick	Bruno T.	Natália	(none)	Alexandre	(none)	Victoria	Giulia	(none)	Natália	(none)		(none)
Nominated (Mansion vote)	Thiago S.	Stephanie	Gyselle	Ana Paula	Thiago S.	(none)	Gabriel	(none)	Giulia	Gyselle	(none)	Ricardo	(none)		(none)
Nominated (Twist)	(none)				Gyselle	(none)	Medrado	(none)	(none)	Murilo	(none)	Daniel	Gyselle; Natália; Sandra; Thiago S.	Alexandre; Gabriel; Gyselle; Natália; Thiago S.	(none)
Thiago S.	Banned	Owner	Ricardo	Alexandre	Natália	Nominated	Alexandre	Not eligible	Victoria	Giulia	Not eligible	Natália	Nominated	Nominated	Winner (Day 75)
Thiago S.	Murilo	Owner	Faby	Ricardo	Murilo	Nominated	Medrado	Not eligible	Giulia	Murilo	Not eligible	Alexandre	Nominated	Nominated	Winner (Day 75)
Gabriel	Sandra	Erick	Erick	Bruno T.	Natália	Not eligible	Victoria	Nominated	Victoria	Ricardo	Not eligible	Natália	Saved	Nominated	Runner-up (Day 75)
Gabriel	Gyselle	Stephanie	Daniel	Medrado	Thiago S.	Not eligible	Ricardo	Nominated	Giulia	Thiago S.	Not eligible	Ricardo	Saved	Nominated	Runner-up (Day 75)
Natália	Owner	Thiago S.	Erick	Alexandre	Owner	Saved	Victoria	Not eligible	Victoria	Giulia	Not eligible	Owner	Nominated	Nominated	Third place (Day 75)
Natália	Owner	Gyselle	Gyselle	Ana Paula	Owner	Saved	Giulia	Not eligible	Giulia	Gyselle	Not eligible	Daniel	Nominated	Nominated	Third place (Day 75)
Gyselle	Natália	Thiago S.	Ricardo	Alexandre	Natália	Nominated	Alexandre	Not eligible	Victoria	Giulia	Nominated	Natália	Nominated	Nominated	Fourth place (Day 75)
Gyselle	Faby	Stephanie	Ana Paula	Ricardo	Alexandre	Nominated	Giulia	Not eligible	Giulia	Gabriel	Nominated	Gabriel	Nominated	Nominated	Fourth place (Day 75)
Alexandre	Natália	Thiago S.	Ricardo	Owner	Janielly	Not eligible	Owner	Saved	Victoria	Ricardo	Not eligible	Sandra	Saved	Nominated	Evicted (Day 73)
Alexandre	Ricardo	Ana Paula	Ana Paula	Owner	Thiago S.	Not eligible	Owner	Saved	Giulia	Daniel	Not eligible	Ricardo	Saved	Nominated	Evicted (Day 73)
Sandra	Owner	Erick	Ricardo	Bruno T.	Natália	Not eligible	Victoria	Not eligible	Victoria	Giulia	Saved	Owner	Nominated	Evicted (Day 72)	
Sandra	Owner	Stephanie	Daniel	Ana Paula	Gyselle	Not eligible	Giulia	Not eligible	Giulia	Gyselle	Saved	Ricardo (x2)	Nominated	Evicted (Day 72)	
Daniel	Natália	Thiago S.	Ricardo	Alexandre	Natália	Not eligible	Alexandre	Nominated	Victoria	Giulia	Nominated	Natália	Evicted (Day 70)		
Daniel	Erick	Stephanie	Giulia	Ricardo	Alexandre	Not eligible	Gabriel	Nominated	Giulia	Natália	Nominated	Alexandre	Evicted (Day 70)		
Ricardo	Sandra	Thiago S.	Owner	Alexandre	Janielly	Not eligible	Alexandre	Not eligible	Murilo	Owner	Owner	Sandra	Evicted (Day 70)		
Ricardo	Thiago S.	Bruno T.	Owner	Daniel	Thiago S.	Not eligible	Gabriel	Not eligible	Gyselle	Gyselle	Owner	Alexandre	Evicted (Day 70)		
Giulia	Natália	Erick	Erick	Bruno T.	Natália	Not eligible	Alexandre	Not eligible	Murilo	Owner	Nominated	Evicted (Day 68)			
Giulia	Thiago S.	Gyselle	Daniel	Ana Paula	Thiago S.	Not eligible	Gabriel	Not eligible	Gyselle	Gyselle	Nominated	Evicted (Day 68)			
Murilo	Natália	Erick	Erick	Bruno T.	Natália	Not eligible	Alexandre	Not eligible	Owner	Ricardo	Evicted (Day 67)				
Murilo	Thiago S.	Stephanie	Gyselle	Ana Paula	Thiago S.	Not eligible	Sandra	Not eligible	Owner	Gyselle	Evicted (Day 67)				
Victoria	Sandra	Erick	Erick	Bruno T.	Natália	Not eligible	Owner	Owner	Owner	Evicted (Day 61)					
Victoria	Thiago S.	Gyselle	Gyselle	Ana Paula	Thiago S.	Not eligible	Owner	Owner	Owner	Evicted (Day 61)					
Janielly	Natália	Thiago S.	Erick	Alexandre	Owner	Owner	Alexandre	Nominated	Evicted (Day 54)						
Janielly	Erick	Stephanie	Daniel	Ana Paula	Owner	Owner	Gabriel	Nominated	Evicted (Day 54)						
Medrado	Sandra	Erick	Erick	Bruno T.	Natália	Not eligible	Alexandre	Evicted (Day 53)							
Medrado	Thiago S.	Bruno T.	Bruno T.	Ana Paula	Gyselle	Not eligible	Gabriel	Evicted (Day 53)							
Bruno T.	Natália	Thiago S.	Ricardo	Owner	Natália	Nominated	Evicted (Day 47)								
Bruno T.	Gyselle	Stephanie	Medrado	Owner	Alexandre	Nominated	Evicted (Day 47)								
Ana Paula	Banned	Erick	Erick	Alexandre	Janielly	Evicted (Day 46)									
Ana Paula	Tiago D.	Alexandre	Gyselle	Ricardo	Alexandre	Evicted (Day 46)									
Tiago D.	Natália	Erick	Erick	Bruno T.	Evicted (Day 40)										
Tiago D.	Erick	Stephanie	Gyselle	Ricardo	Evicted (Day 40)										
Faby	Banned	Erick	Erick	Walked (Day 34)											
Faby	Gyselle	Bruno T.	Thiago S.	Walked (Day 34)											
Erick	Banned	Owner	Owner	Evicted (Day 33)											
Erick	Murilo	Owner	Owner	Evicted (Day 33)											
Stephanie	Sandra	Erick	Evicted (Day 26)												
Stephanie	Gyselle	Bruno T.	Evicted (Day 26)												
Bruno C.	Natália	Evicted (Day 19)													
Bruno C.	Thiago S.	Evicted (Day 19)													
Notes	1	2	3	4, 5	6, 7		8, 9		10	11, 12, 13, 14		15, 16, 17	18	19	20
Risk zone	Bruno T. Natália; Thiago S.	Erick; Faby; Stephanie	Erick; Gyselle; Tiago D.	Ana Paula; Bruno T. Murilo	(none)	Gyselle; Natália; Thiago S.	(none)	Alexandre; Daniel; Gabriel	Giulia; Sandra; Victoria	(none)	Giulia; Gyselle; Sandra	(none)			
Safety winner	Thiago S.	Faby	Tiago D.	Bruno T.	(none)	Natália	(none)	Alexandre	Sandra	(none)	Sandra	(none)			
Nominated (Safety winner)	Bruno C.	Tiago D.	Thiago S.	Tiago D.	(none)	Bruno T.	(none)	Janielly	Ricardo	(none)	Daniel	(none)			
Nominated for eviction	Bruno C. Bruno T. Natália	Erick; Stephanie; Tiago D.	Erick; Gyselle; Thiago S.	Ana Paula; Murilo; Tiago D.	Ana Paula; Gyselle; Natália; Thiago S.	Bruno T. Gyselle; Thiago S.	Alexandre; Daniel; Gabriel; Medrado	Daniel; Gabriel; Janielly	Giulia; Ricardo; Victoria	Giulia; Gyselle; Murilo; Sandra	Daniel; Giulia; Gyselle	Daniel; Natália; Ricardo; Thiago S.	Gyselle; Natália; Sandra; Thiago S.	Alexandre; Gabriel; Gyselle; Natália; Thiago S.	Gabriel; Gyselle; Natália; Thiago S.
Walked	(none)			Faby	(none)										
Evicted	Bruno C. 11.67% to save	Stephanie; 18.39% to save	Erick; 15.69% to save	Tiago D. 20.69% to save	Ana Paula; 5.96% to save	Bruno T. 25.81% to save	Medrado; 16.75% to save	Janielly; 17.00% to save	Victoria; 23.73% to save	Murilo; 19.11% to save	Giulia; 21.73% to save	Ricardo; 3.90% to save	Sandra; 21.41% to save	Alexandre; 7.61% to save	Gyselle; 17.95% to win
Evicted	Bruno C. 11.67% to save	Stephanie; 18.39% to save	Erick; 15.69% to save	Tiago D. 20.69% to save	Ana Paula; 5.96% to save	Bruno T. 25.81% to save	Medrado; 16.75% to save	Janielly; 17.00% to save	Victoria; 23.73% to save	Murilo; 19.11% to save	Giulia; 21.73% to save	Ricardo; 3.90% to save	Sandra; 21.41% to save	Alexandre; 7.61% to save	Natália; 21.59% to win
Evicted	Bruno C. 11.67% to save	Stephanie; 18.39% to save	Erick; 15.69% to save	Tiago D. 20.69% to save	Ana Paula; 5.96% to save	Bruno T. 25.81% to save	Medrado; 16.75% to save	Janielly; 17.00% to save	Victoria; 23.73% to save	Murilo; 19.11% to save	Giulia; 21.73% to save	Daniel; 24.96% to save	Sandra; 21.41% to save	Alexandre; 7.61% to save	Natália; 21.59% to win
Evicted	Bruno C. 11.67% to save	Stephanie; 18.39% to save	Erick; 15.69% to save	Tiago D. 20.69% to save	Ana Paula; 5.96% to save	Bruno T. 25.81% to save	Medrado; 16.75% to save	Janielly; 17.00% to save	Victoria; 23.73% to save	Murilo; 19.11% to save	Giulia; 21.73% to save	Daniel; 24.96% to save	Sandra; 21.41% to save	Alexandre; 7.61% to save	Gabriel; 24.86% to win
Survived	Natália; 32.00% to save	Erick; 38.06% to save	Gyselle; 37.67% to save	Murilo; 28.64% to save	Gyselle; 24.82% to save	Gyselle; 29.66% to save	Daniel; 22.35% to save	Daniel; 31.71% to save	Ricardo; 35.15% to save	Giulia; 21.72% to save	Gyselle; 37.99% to save	Natália; 30.96% to save	Natália; 21.51% to save	Natália; 20.37% to save	Thiago S. 35.60% to win
Survived	Natália; 32.00% to save	Erick; 38.06% to save	Gyselle; 37.67% to save	Murilo; 28.64% to save	Gyselle; 24.82% to save	Gyselle; 29.66% to save	Daniel; 22.35% to save	Daniel; 31.71% to save	Ricardo; 35.15% to save	Giulia; 21.72% to save	Gyselle; 37.99% to save	Natália; 30.96% to save	Natália; 21.51% to save	Gyselle; 21.52% to save	Thiago S. 35.60% to win
Survived	Natália; 32.00% to save	Erick; 38.06% to save	Gyselle; 37.67% to save	Murilo; 28.64% to save	Natália; 25.23% to save	Gyselle; 29.66% to save	Alexandre; 27.51% to save	Daniel; 31.71% to save	Ricardo; 35.15% to save	Sandra; 26.38% to save	Gyselle; 37.99% to save	Natália; 30.96% to save	Gyselle; 24.34% to save	Gyselle; 21.52% to save	Thiago S. 35.60% to win
Survived	Bruno T. 56.33% to save	Tiago D. 43.55% to save	Thiago S. 46.64% to save	Ana Paula; 50.67% to save	Natália; 25.23% to save	Thiago S. 44.53% to save	Alexandre; 27.51% to save	Gabriel; 51.29% to save	Giulia; 41.12% to save	Sandra; 26.38% to save	Daniel; 40.28% to save	Thiago S. 40.18% to save	Gyselle; 24.34% to save	Gabriel; 22.52% to save	Thiago S. 35.60% to win
Survived	Bruno T. 56.33% to save	Tiago D. 43.55% to save	Thiago S. 46.64% to save	Ana Paula; 50.67% to save	Thiago S. 43.99% to save	Thiago S. 44.53% to save	Gabriel; 33.39% to save	Gabriel; 51.29% to save	Giulia; 41.12% to save	Gyselle; 32.79% to save	Daniel; 40.28% to save	Thiago S. 40.18% to save	Thiago S. 32.74% to save	Gabriel; 22.52% to save	Thiago S. 35.60% to win
Survived	Bruno T. 56.33% to save	Tiago D. 43.55% to save	Thiago S. 46.64% to save	Ana Paula; 50.67% to save	Thiago S. 43.99% to save	Thiago S. 44.53% to save	Gabriel; 33.39% to save	Gabriel; 51.29% to save	Giulia; 41.12% to save	Gyselle; 32.79% to save	Daniel; 40.28% to save	Thiago S. 40.18% to save	Thiago S. 32.74% to save	Thiago S. 27.98% to save	Thiago S. 35.60% to win

==== Notes ====
- ^Note 1 : Ana Paula, Erick, Faby and Thiago Servo went through a public vote that banned them from this week's Secret vote to nominate one of the Owners (Natália or Sandra). As a result, they were only eligible to vote during the face-to-face Mansion vote.
- ^Note 2 : Alexandre, Ana Paula, Daniel, Faby, Gabriel, Gyselle, Ricardo, Stephanie and Tiago Dionisio went through a public vote that determined that they would be the only ones eligible to be nominated by the Mansion Owners. They chose to nominate Faby.
- ^Note 3 : Gabriel, Giulia, Gyselle, Janielly, Medrado, Natália, Ricardo, Sandra, Thiago Servo and Victoria went through a public vote that determined that they would be immune from being nominated by the Mansion Owners. However, they were still eligible to be nominated by the Mansion vote.
- ^Note 4 : On Day 34, Faby walked from the game following being informed about the health status of a family member.
- ^Note 5 : Alexandre and Daniel went through a public vote that determined that two votes received by each of them would be cancelled. Alexandre and Bruno Tálamo received 7 nominations each during the Secret vote. However, due to the twist, two votes for Alexandre were cancelled, dropping his total to 5, thus Bruno Tálamo automatically became the second nominee. During the Mansion vote, Ricardo's solo vote for Daniel was also cancelled, but it didn't affect the outcome.
- ^Note 6 : Alexandre, Daniel, Gabriel, Gyselle, Janielly, Medrado, Murilo, Natália, Ricardo, Thiago Servo e Victoria went through a public vote that determined that they would be the only ones eligible to become the fourth nominee through a surprise Mansion vote by the remaining contestants (Ana Paula, Bruno Tálamo, Giulia and Sandra). Gyselle ended up being nominated by an 2–1–1 vote, over Alexandre and Murilo, respectively.
- ^Note 7 : This week featured four nominees and a double eviction. Ana Paula, as the contestant who received the fewest votes from the public, was immediately evicted on Day 46, while the three who survived the vote competed in the Safety challenge. Natália was the winner and chose Bruno Tálamo as a replacement, thus determining who would face the second public vote on Day 47.
- ^Note 8 : Thiago Servo went through a public vote that determined that he would have the power to choose the fourth nominee. He chose Medrado to be the forth nominee.
- ^Note 9 : This week featured four nominees and a double eviction. Medrado, as the contestant who received the fewest votes from the public, was immediately evicted on Day 53, while the three who survived the vote competed in the Safety challenge. Alexandre was the winner and chose Janielly as a replacement, thus determining who would face the second public vote on Day 54.
- ^Note 10 : Daniel, Giulia and Gyselle went through a public vote that determined that they would be the only ones eligible to become the third nominee by the Mansion vote. Giulia ended up being nominated by an 6–2–0 vote, over Gyselle and Daniel, respectively.
- ^Note 11 : This week's Mansion Owners, Giulia and Ricardo had to cast their vote individually in the Mansion vote during nominations.
- ^Note 12 : During the week's nominations, the contestants could not vote for each other through a draw, in which each contestant drawn would veto a contestant from voting for him and then cast his vote in the Mansion vote. Alexandre was vetoed from voting for Thiago Servo, Gabriel was vetoed from voting for Gyselle, Gyselle was vetoed from voting for Murilo and Natália, Natália was vetoed from voting for Daniel, and Ricardo was vetoed from voting for Alexandre and Gabriel.
- ^Note 13 : This week, the Mansion Owners's nominee had the power to choose the fourth nominee. During the nominations, Giulia and Ricardo, as Mansion Owners, nominated Sandra, who in turn nominated Murilo to be the forth nominee.
- ^Note 14 : This week featured four nominees and a double eviction. Murilo, as the contestant who received the fewest votes from the public, was immediately evicted on Day 67, while the three who survived the vote competed in the Safety challenge. Sandra was the winner and chose Daniel as a replacement, thus determining who would face the second public vote on Day 68.
- ^Note 15 : This week's Mansion Owners, Natália and Sandra had to cast their vote individually in the Mansion vote during nominations.
- ^Note 16 : Alexandre and Ricardo were tied with three votes each. Sandra, as this week's immune Mansion Owner, had the casting vote and chose Ricardo to be the third nominee.
- ^Note 17 : Due to a public vote, this week's immune Mansion Owner by the Secret vote would have the power to choose the fourth nominee. Sandra, as this week's immune Mansion Owner, chose Daniel to be the forth nominee. This week, featured a double eviction, and two contestants who received the fewest votes from the public, were immediately evicted on Day 70.
- ^Note 18 : On day 71, the final six contestants competed in the final immunity challenge for place in the final five. On the same day, it was announced that Alexandre was the winner and Gabriel was the second place, and both became the first semifinalists of the season. Gyselle, Natália, Sandra and Thiago Servo were automatically nominated for eviction.
- ^Note 19 : From this point on, the public votes to decide who is evicted and ultimately wins. Following Sandra's eviction on day 72, the final five contestants were automatically nominated for the final eviction of the season.
- ^Note 20 : For the final, the public votes for the contestant they want to win A Grande Conquista 1.

== Ratings and reception ==
=== Brazilian ratings ===
All numbers are in points and provided by Kantar Ibope Media.

Week	First air date	Last air date	Timeslot (BRT)	Daily SP viewers (in points)							SP viewers (in points)	BR viewers (in points)	Ref.
Week	First air date	Last air date	Timeslot (BRT)	Mon	Tue	Wed	Thu	Fri	Sat	Sun	SP viewers (in points)	BR viewers (in points)	Ref.
1	May 8, 2023	May 14, 2023	Monday to Saturday; 10:30 p.m. Sunday; 11:00 p.m.	4.2	4.2	4.4	4.2	4.5	3.4	4.3	4.2	Outside top 10	
2	May 15, 2023	May 21, 2023	Monday to Saturday; 10:30 p.m. Sunday; 11:00 p.m.	3.8	4.0	3.8	4.0	4.1	3.4	4.4	3.9	Outside top 10	
3	May 22, 2023	May 28, 2023	Monday to Saturday; 10:30 p.m. Sunday; 11:00 p.m.	3.6	4.2	4.4	4.3	4.3	3.5	4.0	4.0	Outside top 10	
4	May 29, 2023	June 4, 2023	Monday to Saturday; 10:30 p.m. Sunday; 11:00 p.m.	3.8	4.2	4.3	4.6	4.5	4.1	3.6	4.1	Outside top 10	
5	June 5, 2023	June 11, 2023	Monday to Saturday; 10:30 p.m. Sunday; 11:00 p.m.	4.3	4.8	5.2	4.3	4.2	3.2	4.0	4.3	Outside top 10	
6	June 12, 2023	June 18, 2023	Monday to Saturday; 10:30 p.m. Sunday; 11:00 p.m.	3.8	5.0	4.6	4.4	4.5	4.0	4.5	4.4	Outside top 10	
7	June 19, 2023	June 25, 2023	Monday to Saturday; 10:30 p.m. Sunday; 11:00 p.m.	4.0	4.4	5.2	4.5	4.2	3.5	4.6	4.3	Outside top 10	
8	June 26, 2023	July 2, 2023	Monday to Saturday; 10:30 p.m. Sunday; 11:00 p.m.	4.9	4.5	4.3	4.3	4.0	4.0	3.8	4.3	Outside top 10	
9	July 3, 2023	July 9, 2023	Monday to Saturday; 10:30 p.m. Sunday; 11:00 p.m.	4.2	4.8	4.5	4.5	4.0	3.1	3.6	4.1	Outside top 10	
10	July 10, 2023	July 16, 2023	Monday to Saturday; 10:30 p.m. Sunday; 11:00 p.m.	4.8	5.2	4.8	4.2	4.0	3.5	3.6	4.3	Outside top 10	
11	July 17, 2023	July 20, 2023	Monday to Saturday; 10:30 p.m. Sunday; 11:00 p.m.	4.5	3.7	5.3	5.0	—	—	—	4.6	Outside top 10	

- In 2023, each point represents 268.083 households in 15 market cities in Brazil (76.953 households in São Paulo).
