= Neném =

Neném is a nickname. It may refer to:

- Neném (beach soccer) (born 1973), Carlos Alberto Lisboa, Brazilian beach soccer player and football forward
- Neném (footballer, born 1975), Dorismar Felipe de Souza, Brazilian football defender
- Neném (footballer, born 1986), Jose Maria Carneiro Da Silva, Brazilian football midfielder
- Neném (born 1975), Potiguara da Silva Oliveira, part of the Brazilian musical duo Pepê & Neném
