= Pepê & Neném =

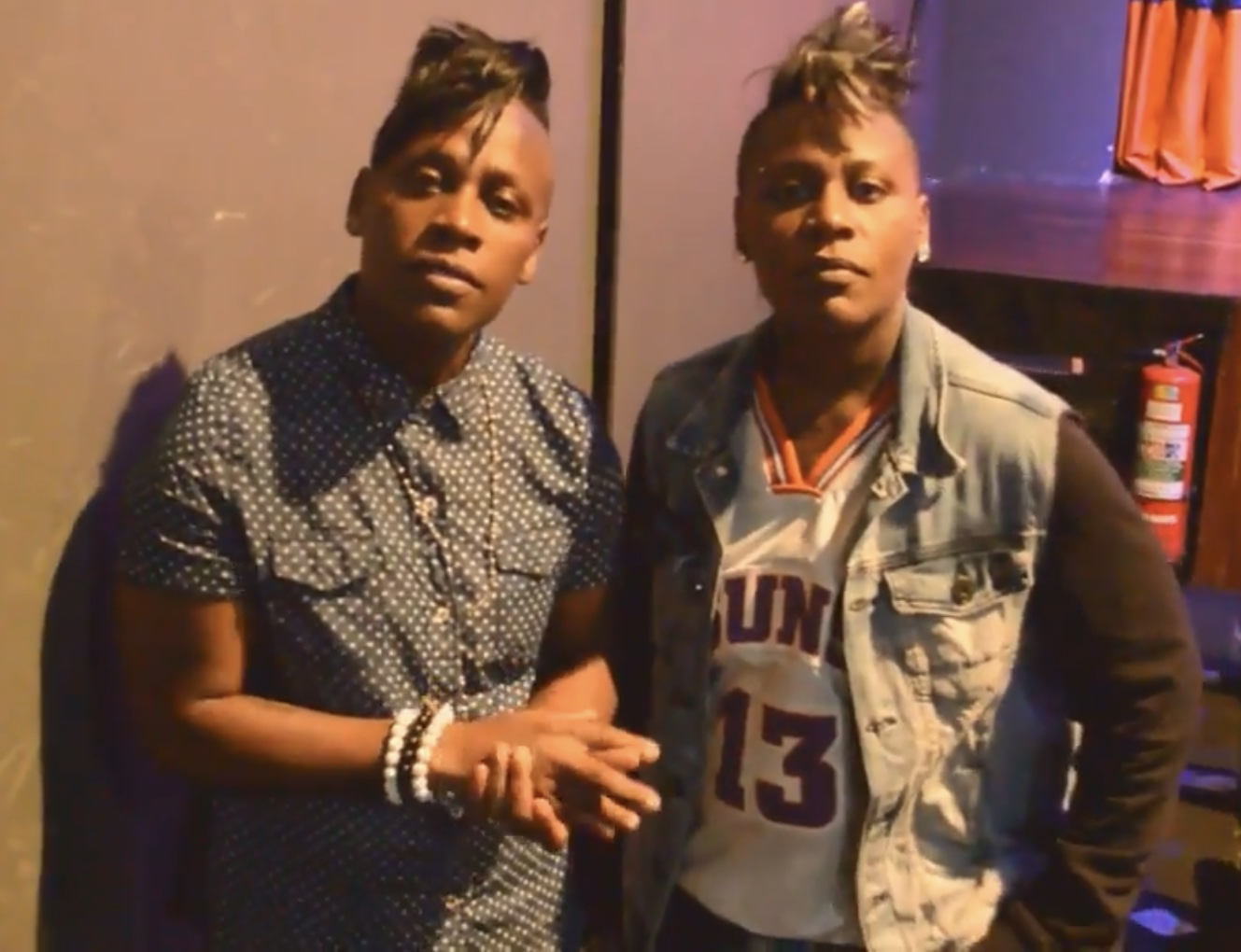
- Pepe & Neném in 2017

Background information
- Born: Potiara da Silva Oliveira (Pepê) · Potiguara da Silva Oliveira (Neném); 6 July 1975 (age 51); Rio de Janeiro, Brazil
- Origin: Rio de Janeiro
- Genres: Contemporary R&B; Pop music
- Years active: 1999–present
- Label: Virgin Records · Som da Terra
- Website: www.pepeenenem.com.br

Pepê & Neném are a Brazilian singing duo formed by twin sisters Potiara da Silva Oliveira and Potiguara da Silva Oliveira (born in Rio de Janeiro on 6 July 1975). In September 2020, Neném officially announced her candidacy for city councilor in São Paulo for the Republican Party of the Social Order. She stated that she did not have much knowledge about the position, but said she was motivated to learn.

== Biography ==
Potiara and Potiguara were born in Irajá, in the northern part of Rio de Janeiro, on 6 July 1975. Their mother died when they were babies. They grew up in a family of seven children.

In 1997, Pepê contracted tuberculosis and was hospitalized, being discharged without being fully cured. The twins received help from an uncle in São Gonçalo, who sheltered them during Pepê's recovery.

In 1995, they met Sebastião Caruso, their first manager, who was responsible for introducing them to the Virgin Records label. From then on, they officially adopted the stage names Pepê and Neném, derived from nicknames given to them by their grandmother.

In 2014, Pepê and Neném participated in the reality show A Fazenda 7 on Rede Record, being the first duo in the program's history to compete as a single participant. During the show, they were involved in a controversy with journalist Felipeh Campos, who criticized their style in a way considered prejudiced. The duo reached the final week of the reality show, being eliminated and finishing in 4th place. After the program, the season's winner, DH Silveira, donated approximately R$ 30,000 to Pepê and Neném and collaborated on a song with them.

== Personal life ==
In 2012, during an interview with presenter Marília Gabriela on the program De Frente com Gabi, Pepê and Neném publicly came out as lesbians. They stated that they had never been in a relationship with men, and Neném recounted that she fell in love with a girl for the first time at the age of ten. In 2017, Pepê and Neném showed support for then-federal deputy Jair Bolsonaro, and in a video published on his official Facebook page, the singers positioned themselves against public displays of affection by same-sex couples.

In 2015, Neném married Thaís Baptista in a R$200,000 ceremony with heightened security to avoid the presence of creditors. The following year, Pepê married Thalyta Santos in a R$300,000 event attended by several celebrities. In December 2016, Thalyta gave birth to twins, Enzo Fabiano and João Gael, conceived through artificial insemination. In the same year, Neném attempted in vitro fertilization but suffered a miscarriage.

In 2017, Pepê and Thalyta briefly separated due to allegations of infidelity on Pepê's part, but soon reconciled. At the end of 2017, Neném had her first daughter, Valentina, conceived using her wife Thaís's egg.

Pepê and Thalyta frequent a candomblé house of worship. Neném and Thaís, on the other hand, are spiritists and Umbandists.
