= Power Couple (Brazilian TV series) season 2 =

Power Couple
- Season 2
- Hosted by: Roberto Justus
- No. of contestants: 22 (11 couples)
- Winners: Nayara & Cairo
- Runners-up: Marcelly & Frank
- No. of episodes: 20

Release
- Original network: RecordTV
- Original release: April 18 – June 22, 2017

Season chronology
- ← Previous; Season 1 Next → Season 3

The second season of Power Couple premiered on Tuesday, April 18, 2017, at 10:30 p.m. on RecordTV.

The show features eleven celebrity couples living under one roof and facing extreme challenges that will test how well they really know each other. Each week, a couple will be eliminated until the last couple wins the grand prize.

Nayara Justino & Cairo Jardim won the competition with 65.07% of the public vote over MC Marcelly & Frank Cavalcante and Fábio Villa Verde & Regiane Cesnique and took home the R$399.000 prize they accumulated during the show. Marcelly & Frank received a brand new car as the runners-up.

== Cast ==
=== Couples ===
Celebrity	Occupation	Partner	Occupation	Status
Carol Narizinho	Model	Mateus Boeira	Businessman	Eliminated 1st on April 20, 2017
Thaíde Returned on May 25	Rapper & TV host	Ana P. Onofre; Returned on May 25	Singer	Eliminated 2nd on April 27, 2017
Diego Cristo	Actor	Lorena Bueri	Model	Eliminated 3rd on May 4, 2017
Andressa Ganacin	YouTuber	Nasser Rodrigues	Illustrator	Eliminated 4th on May 18, 2017
Marcelo Zangrandi	Comedian	Júlia Zangrandi	Publicist	Evacuated on June 1, 2017
Rafael Ilha	Singer	Aline Kezh	Housewife	Eliminated 5th on June 1, 2017
Sylvinho Blau-Blau	Singer	Ana Paula Pereira	Shoe designer	Eliminated 6th on June 8, 2017
Maurício Ribeiro	Actor	Suyane Moreira	Actress	Eliminated 7th on June 15, 2017
Thaíde	Rapper & TV host	Ana P. Onofre	Singer	Eliminated 8th on June 22, 2017
Fábio Villa Verde	Actor	Regiane Cesnique	Flight attendant	Third place on June 22, 2017
MC Marcelly	Funk singer	Frank Cavalcante	Businessman	Runner-up on June 22, 2017
Nayara Justino	Actress	Cairo Jardim	Businessman	Winners on June 22, 2017

== Future appearances ==
After this season, in 2017, Marcelo Zangrandi (from Marcelo & Júlia) appeared in A Fazenda 9, he finished in 8th place.

After this season, in 2018, Rafael Ilha (from Rafael & Aline) appeared in A Fazenda 10, where he won the competition.

After this season, in 2020, Carol Narizinho (from Carol & Mateus) appeared in A Fazenda 12, she finished 16th place.

== The game ==
Key

Men's challenge bet	Women's challenge bet	**T** Total money combined	Passed the challenge (adds the betting sum)	Failed the challenge (deducts the betting sum)	Won couples' challenge (immunity and adds R$20.000)

=== Challenges' results ===
		Week 1	Week 2	Week 3	Week 4	Week 5	Week 6	Week 7	Week 8	Week 9	Week 10	
		Week 1	Week 2	Week 3	Week 4	Week 5	Week 6	Week 7	Week 8	Week 9	Top 4	Finale
Sum of money		R$40.000	R$40.000	R$40.000	R$40.000	R$40.000	R$100.000	R$40.000	R$40.000	R$40.000	R$40.000	Jackpot
Bets
Nayara & Cairo		R$05.000	R$20.000	R$18.000	R$14.000	R$07.000		R$10.000	R$08.000	R$06.000	R$19.000	R$399.000
Nayara & Cairo		R$19.000	R$32.000	R$37.000	R$16.000	R$08.000		R$30.000	R$16.000	R$07.000	R$21.000	R$399.000
Nayara & Cairo	T	R$26.000	R$28.000	R$95.000	R$10.000	R$25.000		R$60.000	R$32.000	R$41.000	R$42.000	R$399.000
Marcelly & Frank		R$08.000	R$25.000	R$30.000	R$05.000	R$05.000		R$01.000	R$05.000	R$04.000	R$21.000	R$376.000
Marcelly & Frank		R$32.000	R$36.000	R$04.000	R$15.000	R$15.000		R$39.000	R$20.000	R$06.000	R$19.000	R$376.000
Marcelly & Frank	T	R$00.000	R$29.000	R$14.000	R$40.000	R$60.000		R$78.000	R$75.000	R$42.000	R$38.000	R$376.000
Fábio & Regiane		R$17.000	R$21.000	R$19.000	R$10.000	R$15.000		R$15.000	R$17.000	R$15.000	R$30.000	R$370.000
Fábio & Regiane		R$23.000	R$09.000	R$02.000	R$17.000	R$07.000		R$09.000	R$23.000	R$14.000	R$13.000	R$370.000
Fábio & Regiane	T	R$00.000	R$10.000	R$43.000	R$13.000	R$62.000		R$64.000	R$34.000	R$41.000	R$103.000	R$370.000
Thaíde & Ana P.		R$29.000	R$29.000				R$35.000	R$07.000	R$04.000	R$05.000	R$20.000	~~R$41.000~~; R$214.000
Thaíde & Ana P.		R$29.000	R$10.000				R$70.000	R$15.000	R$25.000	R$05.000	R$20.000	~~R$41.000~~; R$214.000
Thaíde & Ana P.	T	R$40.000	R$01.000				R$125.000	R$48.000	R$11.000	R$30.000	R$00.000	~~R$41.000~~; R$214.000
Maurício & Suyane		R$15.000	R$18.000	R$21.000	R$15.000	R$08.000		R$17.000	R$15.000	R$20.000		R$425.000
Maurício & Suyane		R$05.000	R$35.000	R$35.000	R$04.000	R$18.000		R$23.000	R$10.000	R$20.000		R$425.000
Maurício & Suyane	T	R$20.000	R$113.000	R$96.000	R$21.000	R$50.000		R$80.000	R$45.000	R$00.000		R$425.000
Sylvinho & Ana Paula		R$07.000	R$19.000	R$09.000	R$04.000	R$08.000		R$04.000	R$10.000			R$265.000
Sylvinho & Ana Paula		R$31.000	R$ 19.000	R$17.000	R$07.000	R$18.000		R$04.000	R$24.000			R$265.000
Sylvinho & Ana Paula	T	R$64.000	R$02.000	R$66.000	R$29.000	R$30.000		R$48.000	R$26.000			R$265.000
Rafael & Aline		R$10.000	R$30.000	R$20.000	R$07.000	R$09.000		R$05.000				R$180.000
Rafael & Aline		R$07.000	R$45.000	R$00.000	R$18.000	R$13.000		R$10.000				R$180.000
Rafael & Aline	T	R$57.000	R$25.000	R$20.000	R$15.000	R$18.000		R$45.000				R$180.000
Marcelo & Júlia		R$09.000	R$31.000	R$28.000	R$21.000	R$21.000		R$18.000				R$274.000
Marcelo & Júlia		R$18.000	R$11.000	R$01.000	R$21.000	R$25.000		R$11.000				R$274.000
Marcelo & Júlia	T	R$13.000	R$60.000	R$13.000	R$82.000	R$36.000		R$70.000				R$274.000
Andressa & Nasser		R$32.000	R$26.000	R$35.000	R$25.000	R$18.000	R$10.000					R$297.000
Andressa & Nasser		R$20.000	R$13.000	R$40.000	R$25.000	R$22.000	R$49.000					R$297.000
Andressa & Nasser	T	R$92.000	R$01.000	R$105.000	R$40.000	R$00.000	R$59.000					R$297.000
Diego & Lorena		R$30.000	R$35.000	R$35.000			R$16.000					R$347.000
Diego & Lorena		R$30.000	R$40.000	R$05.000			R$86.000					R$347.000
Diego & Lorena	T	R$120.000	R$115.000	R$10.000			R$102.000					R$347.000
Carol & Mateus		R$14.000					R$14.000					R$46.000
Carol & Mateus		R$08.000					R$84.000					R$46.000
Carol & Mateus	T	R$46.000					R$98.000					R$46.000
Notes		1	2	(none)			3	2	(none)		5	(none)
Least money (pre-challenge)		Marcelly; Frank	Thaíde; Ana P.									
Least money (pre-challenge)		Fábio; Regiane	Andressa; Nasser	Diego; Lorena	Nayara; Cairo	Andressa; Nasser	Andressa; Nasser	Sylvinho; Ana Paula	Thaíde; Ana P.	Maurício; Suyane	Thaíde; Ana P.	
Couples' challenge winners		Diego; Lorena	Maurício; Suyane	Fábio; Regiane	Marcelly; Frank	Maurício; Suyane	Thaíde; Ana P.	Nayara; Cairo	Marcelly; Frank	Nayara; Cairo	Fábio; Regiane	
Nominated
Couples' challenge losers		Carol; Mateus	Sylvinho; Ana Paula	Maurício; Suyane	Rafael; Aline	Marcelly; Frank	Diego; Lorena	Rafael; Aline	Sylvinho; Ana Paula	Maurício; Suyane	Thaíde; Ana P.	
Least money (post-challenge)		Marcelly; Frank	Thaíde; Ana P.	Diego; Lorena	Nayara; Cairo	Andressa; Nasser	Carol; Mateus	Sylvinho; Ana Paula	Thaíde; Ana P.	Fábio; Regiane		
Least money (post-challenge)		Fábio; Regiane	Andressa; Nasser									

==== Notes ====
- **^Note 1** : Marcelly & Frank and Fábio & Regiane were tied in last place for the week with R$ 0 each. Per the rules, since both couples were also tied in their overall Bank accounts, Marcelly & Frank, who finished the Couple's challenge behind Fábio & Regiane, were nominated.
- **^Note 2** : Thaíde & Ana P. and Andressa & Nasser were tied in last place for the week with R$ 1.000 each. Per the rules, since Thaíde & Ana P. have the least money in their overeall Bank account, they were nominated.
- **^Note 3** : No bets were made this week. Instead, each previous eliminated couples' sum of money of R$100.000 would decrease by R$1.000 for each fifteen seconds they spent doing the challenges and also, eventual punishments. At the end of the Men & Women's challenges, Andressa & Nasser, as the couple with the least money combined, were sent home first. At the Couples' challenge, Thaíde & Ana P. outlasted Carol & Mateus and Diego & Lorena and re-entered the game.
- **^Note 4** : At the end of the Men & Women's challenges, Sylvinho & Ana Paula, as the couple with the least money combined were automatically nominated, since they couldn't compete in the Couple's challenge due to being chosen by Special power winners Maurício & Suyane at week 5's Elimination ceremony.
- **^Note 5** : The final Couples' Challenge losing couple would be automatically eliminated. Fábio & Regiane won the challenge followed by Nayara & Cairo and Marcelly & Frank. In last place, Thaíde & Ana P. were eliminated.

=== Special power ===
For the first five weeks, the Couple's challenge winners randomly will pick two out of eight envelopes of the following colors: yellow, orange, grey, green, pink, blue, white and red. Then, the couple will be given a choice between two advantages in the game. The couple's choice is marked in bold.

Results

Week	Couples' challenge winners	Advantages
1	**Diego & Lorena**	Give immunity to another couple the following week.; **An extra vote at this week's Elimination ceremony**. →**Diego & Lorena's vote twice on Marcelly & Frank**
2	**Maurício & Suyane**	**Give a couple an advantage at the next Men & Women's challenges**. → **Sylvinho & Ana Paula**; Ban a couple from compete in next week's Couple's challenge.
3	**Fábio & Regiane**	**Cancel another couple's vote**. → **Andressa & Nasser**; A sole vote counted as two at this week's Elimination ceremony.
4	**Marcelly & Frank**	Chose a couple to have next week's sum of money reduced.; **Cancel this week's Elimination**.
5	**Maurício & Suyane**	Chose a couple to have next week's sum of money reduced.; **Ban a couple from compete in next week's Couple's challenge**. → **Sylvinho & Ana Paula**

=== Voting history ===
	Week 1	Week 2	Week 3	Week 4	Week 5	Week 6	Week 7	Week 8	Week 9	Week 10	
	Week 1	Week 2	Week 3	Week 4	Week 5	Week 6	Week 7	Week 8	Week 9	Top 4	Finale
Power Couple	Diego; Lorena	Diego; Lorena	Andressa; Nasser	Marcelo; Júlia	Fábio; Regiane	Thaíde; Ana P.	Maurício; Suyane	Marcelly; Frank	Nayara; Cairo	Fábio; Regiane	(none)
Nominated	Carol; Mateus	Sylvinho; Ana Paula	Diego; Lorena	Nayara; Cairo	Andressa; Nasser	(none)	Rafael; Aline	Sylvinho; Ana Paula	Fábio; Regiane	Fábio; Regiane	(none)
Nominated	Carol; Mateus	Sylvinho; Ana Paula	Diego; Lorena	Nayara; Cairo	Andressa; Nasser	(none)	Rafael; Aline	Sylvinho; Ana Paula	Fábio; Regiane	Marcelly; Frank	(none)
Nominated	Marcelly; Frank	Thaíde; Ana P.	Maurício; Suyane	Rafael; Aline	Marcelly; Frank	(none)	Sylvinho; Ana Paula	Thaíde; Ana P.	Maurício; Suyane	Nayara; Cairo	(none)
Nominated	Marcelly; Frank	Thaíde; Ana P.	Maurício; Suyane	Rafael; Aline	Marcelly; Frank	(none)	Sylvinho; Ana Paula	Thaíde; Ana P.	Maurício; Suyane	Thaíde; Ana P.	(none)
Nayara & Cairo	Carol; Mateus	Sylvinho; Ana Paula	Maurício; Suyane	Nominated	Andressa; Nasser	Not eligible	Sylvinho; Ana Paula	Thaíde; Ana P.	Fábio; Regiane	Not eligible	**Winners** (week 10)
Marcelly & Frank	Nominated	Sylvinho; Ana Paula	Diego; Lorena	~~Nayara~~; ~~Cairo~~	Nominated	Not eligible	Sylvinho; Ana Paula	Thaíde; Ana P.	Fábio; Regiane	Not eligible	**Runner-up** (week 10)
Fábio & Regiane	Marcelly; Frank	Sylvinho; Ana Paula	Diego; Lorena	~~Rafael~~; ~~Aline~~	Marcelly; Frank	Not eligible	Sylvinho; Ana Paula	Thaíde; Ana P.	Nominated	Not eligible	**Third place** (week 10)
Thaíde & Ana P.	Marcelly; Frank	Nominated	Eliminated (Week 2)			Returned	Sylvinho; Ana Paula	Nominated	Maurício; Suyane	Not eligible	Re-Eliminated (Week 10)
Maurício & Suyane	Marcelly; Frank	Sylvinho; Ana Paula	Nominated	~~Rafael~~; ~~Aline~~	Marcelly; Frank	Not eligible	Sylvinho; Ana Paula	Thaíde; Ana P.	Nominated	Eliminated (Week 9)	
Sylvinho & Ana Paula	Marcelly; Frank	Nominated	Maurício; Suyane	~~Nayara~~; ~~Cairo~~	Andressa; Nasser	Not eligible	Nominated	Nominated	Eliminated (Week 8)		
Rafael & Aline	Marcelly; Frank	Sylvinho; Ana Paula	Maurício; Suyane	Nominated	Marcelly; Frank	Not eligible	Nominated	Eliminated (Week 7)			
Marcelo & Júlia	Marcelly; Frank	Sylvinho; Ana Paula	Maurício; Suyane	~~Nayara~~; ~~Cairo~~	Marcelly; Frank	Not eligible	Evacuated (Week 7)				
Andressa & Nasser	Marcelly; Frank	Sylvinho; Ana Paula	~~Maurício~~; ~~Suyane~~	~~Nayara~~; ~~Cairo~~	Nominated	Eliminated (Week 5)					
Diego & Lorena	Marcelly; Frank ^{(×2)}	Sylvinho; Ana Paula	Nominated	Eliminated (Week 3)							
Carol & Mateus	Nominated	Eliminated (Week 1)									
Notes	6	(none)	7	8	(none)	9	10	(none)		11	12
Evacuated	(none)						**Marcelo**; **Júlia**	(none)			
Eliminated	**Carol**; **Mateus**; 1 of 10 votes to save	**Thaíde**; **Ana P.** 0 of 8 votes to save	**Diego**; **Lorena**; 2 of 6 votes to save	Elimination cancelled	**Andressa**; **Nasser**; 2 of 6 votes to save	**Thaíde**; **Ana P.** Won couples' challenge	**Rafael**; **Aline**; 0 of 5 votes to save	**Sylvinho**; **Ana Paula**; 0 of 4 votes to save	**Maurício**; **Suyane**; 1 of 3 votes to save	**Thaíde**; **Ana P.** Lost couples' challenge	**Fábio**; **Regiane**; 12.18% to win
Eliminated	**Carol**; **Mateus**; 1 of 10 votes to save	**Thaíde**; **Ana P.** 0 of 8 votes to save	**Diego**; **Lorena**; 2 of 6 votes to save	Elimination cancelled	**Andressa**; **Nasser**; 2 of 6 votes to save	**Thaíde**; **Ana P.** Won couples' challenge	**Rafael**; **Aline**; 0 of 5 votes to save	**Sylvinho**; **Ana Paula**; 0 of 4 votes to save	**Maurício**; **Suyane**; 1 of 3 votes to save	**Thaíde**; **Ana P.** Lost couples' challenge	**Marcelly**; **Frank**; 22.75% to win
Saved	**Marcelly**; **Frank**; 9 of 10 votes to save	**Sylvinho**; **Ana Paula**; 8 of 8 votes to save	**Maurício**; **Suyane**; 4 of 6 votes to save	Elimination cancelled	**Marcelly**; **Frank**; 4 of 6 votes to save	**Carol**; **Mateus**; Lost couples' challenge	**Sylvinho**; **Ana Paula**; 5 of 5 votes to save	**Thaíde**; **Ana P.** 4 of 4 votes to save	**Fábio**; **Regiane**; 2 of 3 votes to save	**Marcelly**; **Frank**; Finalist couples' challenge	**Nayara**; **Cairo**; 65.07% to win
Saved	**Marcelly**; **Frank**; 9 of 10 votes to save	**Sylvinho**; **Ana Paula**; 8 of 8 votes to save	**Maurício**; **Suyane**; 4 of 6 votes to save	Elimination cancelled	**Marcelly**; **Frank**; 4 of 6 votes to save	**Diego**; **Lorena**; Lost couples' challenge	**Sylvinho**; **Ana Paula**; 5 of 5 votes to save	**Thaíde**; **Ana P.** 4 of 4 votes to save	**Fábio**; **Regiane**; 2 of 3 votes to save	**Nayara**; **Cairo**; Finalist couples' challenge	**Nayara**; **Cairo**; 65.07% to win
Saved	**Marcelly**; **Frank**; 9 of 10 votes to save	**Sylvinho**; **Ana Paula**; 8 of 8 votes to save	**Maurício**; **Suyane**; 4 of 6 votes to save	Elimination cancelled	**Marcelly**; **Frank**; 4 of 6 votes to save	**Andressa**; **Nasser**; Lost couples' challenge	**Sylvinho**; **Ana Paula**; 5 of 5 votes to save	**Thaíde**; **Ana P.** 4 of 4 votes to save	**Fábio**; **Regiane**; 2 of 3 votes to save	**Fábio**; **Regiane**; Finalist couples' challenge	**Nayara**; **Cairo**; 65.07% to win

==== Notes ====
- **^Note 6** : Diego & Lorena played their extra vote, therefore ten votes were cast in total.
- **^Note 7** : Fábio & Regiane had to pick one couple to have their vote cancelled. Andressa & Nasser were chosen after the votes were cast, nullifying their vote for Maurício & Suyane.
- **^Note 8** : Marcelly & Frank chose to cancel this week's elimination, nullifying all the votes cast.
- **^Note 9** : Instead of permanent elimination, the first four eliminated couples received a chance to return to the game through a series of competitions known as Wildcard round.
- **^Note 10** : Before Week 7's elimination ceremony, Marcelo suffered a cardiac arrhythmia. Unable to perform in the physical challenges of the game, Marcelo & Júlia were evacuated from the competition and left the house.
- **^Note 11** : The final Couples' Challenge losing couple would be automatically eliminated. However, host Justus revealed that the results would be delivered only during the live final.
- **^Note 12** : Following the live final elimination, the public votes for the couple they want to win Power Couple Brasil 2.

== Ratings and reception ==
=== Brazilian ratings ===
All numbers are in points and provided by Kantar Ibope Media.

Week	First air date	Last air date	Timeslot (BRT)	Daily SP viewers (in points)		SP viewers (in points)	BR viewers (in points)	Ref.
Week	First air date	Last air date	Timeslot (BRT)	Tuesday	Thursday	SP viewers (in points)	BR viewers (in points)	Ref.
1	April 18, 2017	April 20, 2017	Tuesday & Thursday; 10:30 p.m.	6.8	5.8	6.3	6.5	
2	April 25, 2017	April 27, 2017	Tuesday & Thursday; 10:30 p.m.	6.4	8.3	7.3	7.1	
3	May 2, 2017	May 4, 2017	Tuesday & Thursday; 10:30 p.m.	6.3	7.6	6.9	7.0	
4	May 9, 2017	May 11, 2017	Tuesday & Thursday; 10:30 p.m.	6.7	7.3	7.0	7.3	
5	May 16, 2017	May 18, 2017	Tuesday & Thursday; 10:30 p.m.	7.6	7.0	7.3	7.5	
6	May 23, 2017	May 25, 2017	Tuesday & Thursday; 10:30 p.m.	7.0	7.5	7.2	7.4	
7	May 30, 2017	June 1, 2017	Tuesday & Thursday; 10:30 p.m.	7.9	8.1	8.0	7.9	
8	June 6, 2017	June 8, 2017	Tuesday & Thursday; 10:30 p.m.	7.1	9.7	8.3	8.1	
9	June 13, 2017	June 15, 2017	Tuesday & Thursday; 10:30 p.m.	7.2	8.2	7.7	7.8	
10	June 20, 2017	June 22, 2017	Tuesday & Thursday; 10:30 p.m.	7.7	7.9	7.8	8.1	

- In 2017, each point represents 245.700 households in 15 market cities in Brazil (70.500 households in São Paulo).
