= Aritana Maroni =

Businesswoman

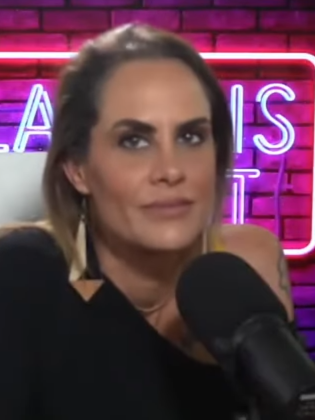
- Born: Aritana Vaccari Maroni; November 16, 1978 (age 47); São Paulo
- Occupations: Businesswoman cook
- Parent: Oscar Maroni

Aritana Vaccari Maroni (born 16 November 1978) is a Brazilian businesswoman and cook.

== Early life ==
The granddaughter of Italian immigrants, Aritana Vaccari Maroni is the eldest child of the Maroni family, which also includes three sons–Aruã, Aratã, and Acauã. Her name was inspired by the telenovela Aritana, broadcast by Rede Tupi in 1978. As her father Oscar Maroni later recollected, "Aritana in the telenovela was a male character. But in the indigenous language, the name meant being a warrior, having power. I used it to name my first daughter".

== Personal life ==
Aritana was married to Paulo Rogério dos Santos from 2005 to 2020 and has two children: Igor, born in November 2005, and Manuela, born in August 2008. In 2024, she stated publicly that she identifies herself as pansexual.

== Media career ==
Year	Program	Role	Ref.
2015	MasterChef Brasil 2	Participant	
2017	A Fazenda: Nova Chance	Participant	
2018	Power Couple Brasil 3	Participant	
2019	Troca de Esposas	Participant	
2022	Cozinhe se Puder	Participant	

=== MasterChef Brasil ===
Passionate about gastronomy, Aritana often helped her grandmother in the kitchen whenever her parents traveled and she had to take care of her siblings. She is particularly knowledgeable about meat, as her father raised cattle for beef production. In 2015, she joined the second season of the culinary competition show MasterChef Brasil. She was the twelfth contestant eliminated, in a challenge that came down to her and Izabel Alvares, who later won the season.

=== A Fazenda ===
In 2017, Aritana joined the ninth season of the rural reality show A Fazenda, the same program in which her father had participated in 2014. Aritana was the seventh contestant to be eliminated on the 52nd day of confinement. The elimination vote set a record for the program as Aritana received 41.89% of the votes to remain in the competition but was eventually eliminated by Flávia Viana, who later won the season.

=== Power Couple Brasil ===
Aritana participated alongside her then-husband Paulo Rogério dos Santos, to whom she was married for 15 years, in the third season of the reality show Power Couple Brasil. Aritana and Paulo accumulated 614,000 reais throughout the competition and finished as runners-up on the 66th day of confinement. They reached the final without ever facing a D.R. (elimination round) and received 39.02% of the vote during the poll to choose the winner, but eventually finished behind the winners Tati Minerato and Marcelo Galático.

=== Troca de Esposas ===
In February 2019, Aritana participated in the first season of Troca de Esposas. Her participation was controversial, as Aritana, an outspoken meat-eater and owner of a meat-processing business, was assigned to live with a vegan family in the municipality of Itatiba in the interior of São Paulo state. During the seven days she spent in her new home, she was prohibited from bringing animal products into the house. As a result, she ended up grilling meat and eating outside while seated on a brick and using a small stool as a table.
