= Oscar Maroni =

Brazilian businessman (1951–2025)

Oscar Maroni Filho
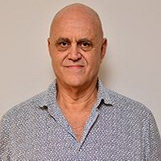
- Maroni in 2018
- Born: January 27, 1951; Jundiaí, São Paulo, Brazil
- Died: December 31, 2025 (aged 74); São Paulo, Brazil
- Occupations: Businessman, psychologist
- Years active: 1980s–2020s
- Known for: Owner of the Bahamas Night Club; Adult entertainment industry
- Political party: Labour Party of Brazil (PTdoB) (2008); Republican Party of the Social Order (PROS) (2018)
- Spouse: Marisa Vaccari (separated)
- Children: 4 (including Aritana Maroni)

Oscar Maroni Filho (January 27, 1951 – December 31, 2025) was a Brazilian businessman who operated in the adult entertainment industry. He was best known as the owner of the Bahamas Night Club in the city of São Paulo, and various public controversies. He worked in adult entertainment, livestock farming, and hospitality. He was publisher of the Brazilian editions of Penthouse and Hustler magazines.

== Biography ==
=== Early years and education ===
The son of Oscar Milano Maroni and Maria de Lourdes Costabile, both of Italian origin, Oscar Maroni was born in the city of Jundiaí, in the interior of the state of São Paulo. Before becoming an entrepreneur in the adult entertainment industry in São Paulo, he graduated with a degree in psychology and ran his own practice for five years. He began his professional life with a snack trailer. He studied in the afternoons and took turns with his girlfriend Marisa Vaccari, whom he met in college and would later marry.

=== Public life ===
In 2007, Maroni was arrested on charges of exploitation of prostitution, criminal conspiracy, and human trafficking. He was detained between August and October of that year, for fifty days, but was granted habeas corpus and responded to the charges while free.

Affiliated with the Labour Party of Brazil (PTdoB), in 2008, he ran for city councilor in São Paulo in a controversial campaign aimed at provoking then-mayor Gilberto Kassab, after a series of public disagreements with Kassab, especially after TAM Airlines Flight 3054.

In 2011, Maroni was sentenced in the first instance to 11 years and 8 months in prison for the crimes of promoting prostitution and maintaining a place for sexual encounters, but he did not serve his sentence. Subsequently, in 2013, he was acquitted by the Court of Justice of São Paulo (TJSP) and by the Superior Court of Justice (STJ) in 2017, with the court ruling that Bahamas did not constitute a brothel (despite the presence of sex workers).

On September 14, 2014, he joined the seventh season of the reality show A Fazenda, broadcast by Rede Record. On October 2, 2014, he was the first contestant to be eliminated from the program.

In 2017, he was the central character in O Colecionador de Emoções (The Collector of Emotions), recounting his career and criticizing the São Paulo City Hall, written by journalist Leonardo Castello Branco. The following year, in celebration of the arrest of former President Luiz Inácio Lula da Silva of the Workers' Party (PT), dressed as a beagle boys, Maroni promoted the distribution of more than 9,000 cans of Brahma beer for free in front of his adult entertainment club.

After his unsuccessful attempt to become a city councilor in São Paulo, Maroni went so far as to say in interviews that he would like to be president of Brazil. Despite his desire, he chose to support the far-right candidacy of Jair Bolsonaro for the presidency of Brazil in the 2018 election. In the same year, he ran for federal deputy for São Paulo for the Republican Party of the Social Order (PROS), but was unsuccessful after receiving just over 6,000 votes.

==== Electoral performance ====
| Year | Position | Party | Votes | Result | Ref. |
|---|---|---|---|---|---|
| 2008 | City Councilor of São Paulo | PTdoB | 5804 | Not elected | |
| 2018 | Federal Deputy for São Paulo | PROS | 6361 | Not elected | |

== Business activity ==
=== Bahamas Hotel Club ===
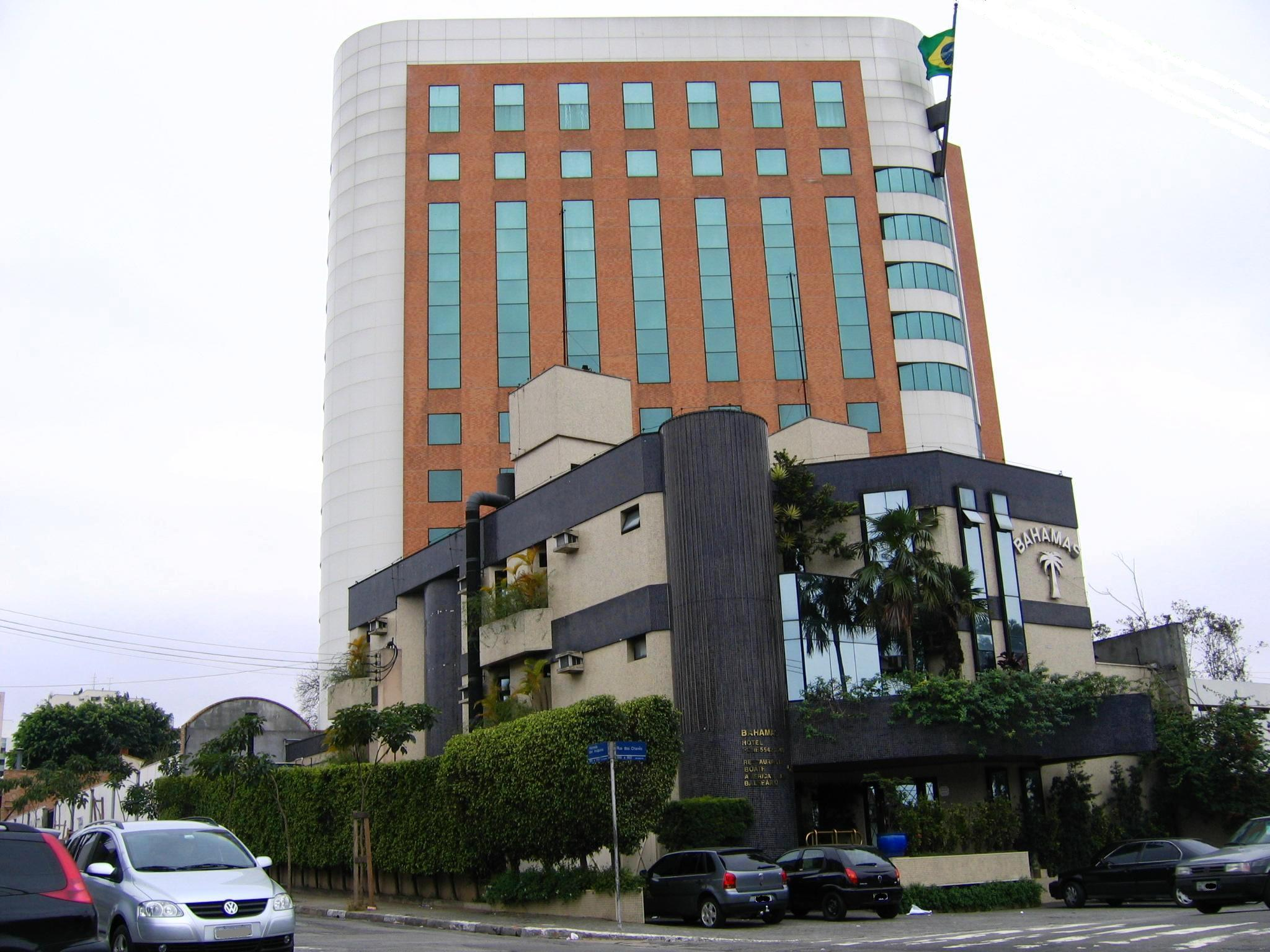
Bahamas Hotel Club for adult-orientated entairment in São Paulo

Maroni was the owner of the Bahamas Hotel Club, located at 571 Chanés Street in the Moema neighborhood of São Paulo. The Bahamas offers a variety of entertainment options for adults. Bahamas was shut down by the City Council in 2007, on the grounds that the establishment was not licensed and did not have an accessibility certificate or a security system maintenance certificate.

The place has become part of the nightlife and prostitution scene in the city of São Paulo, having already welcomed celebrities such as boxer Mike Tyson.

=== Oscar's Hotel ===
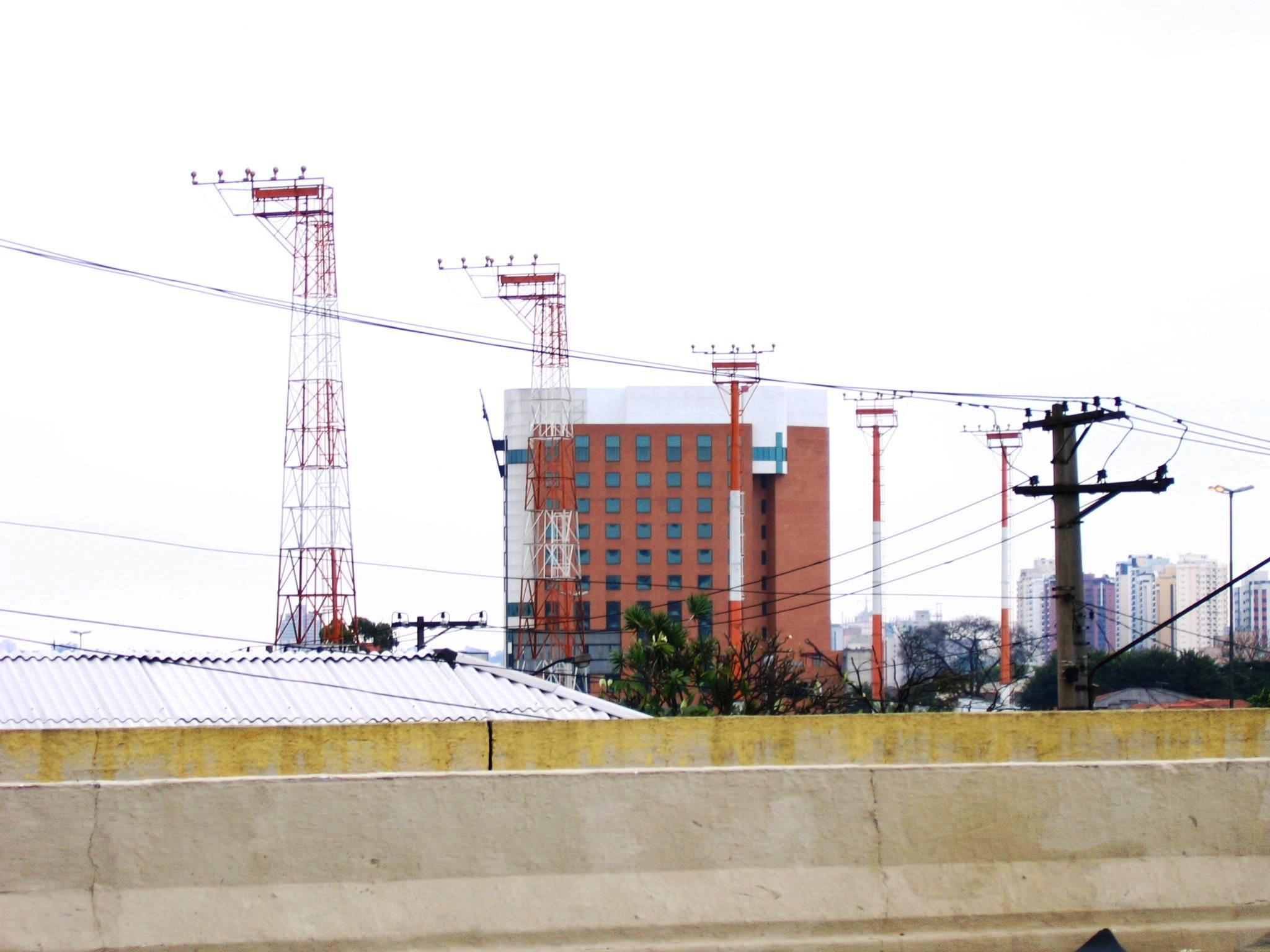
Image showing the proximity of the Oscar's Hotel building to the Congonhas Airport beacons

Maroni built the 11-story Oscar's Hotel, located at Rua dos Chanés No. 621, 600 meters from one end of the runway at São Paulo–Congonhas Airport.

After the accident involving TAM Flight 3054, Gilberto Kassab, then mayor of São Paulo, revoked the hotel's approval and construction permit, claiming that the hotel posed a risk to aircraft and reduced the size of the runway. Maroni protested during the hotel's closure, saying he was being used as a "scapegoat" and calling Kassab's measure "electioneering." The Regional Air Command (COMAR), a territorial division of the Brazilian Air Force (FAB) responsible for airspace management and operations, concluded that Oscar's Hotel met the required standards at the start of construction and that there was no reason to demolish the building. The building has been sealed since the court order during Kassab's term.

== Personal life and death ==
Maroni was known for his outgoing and talkative nature. Maroni often appeared in public with a pet in his arms: a Maltese dog named Docinho.

He was the father of one daughter and three sons: Aritana, Aruã, Aratã, and Acauã. Their names were inspired by the soap opera Aritana, broadcast by Rede Tupi in 1978. "Aritana was a male character in the soap opera. But in the indigenous language, the name meant to be a warrior, to have power. I used it to name my first daughter," said Oscar Maroni. His daughter, Aritana, is an administrator and chef, having participated in the second season of MasterChef, finishing in eighth place, and participated in A Fazenda 9, being the seventh contestant eliminated.

Maroni died on December 31, 2025, in a nursing home in the city of São Paulo. Maroni suffered from Alzheimer's disease in his later years, eventually developing dementia, but the cause of death was not disclosed.
