= DH Silveira =

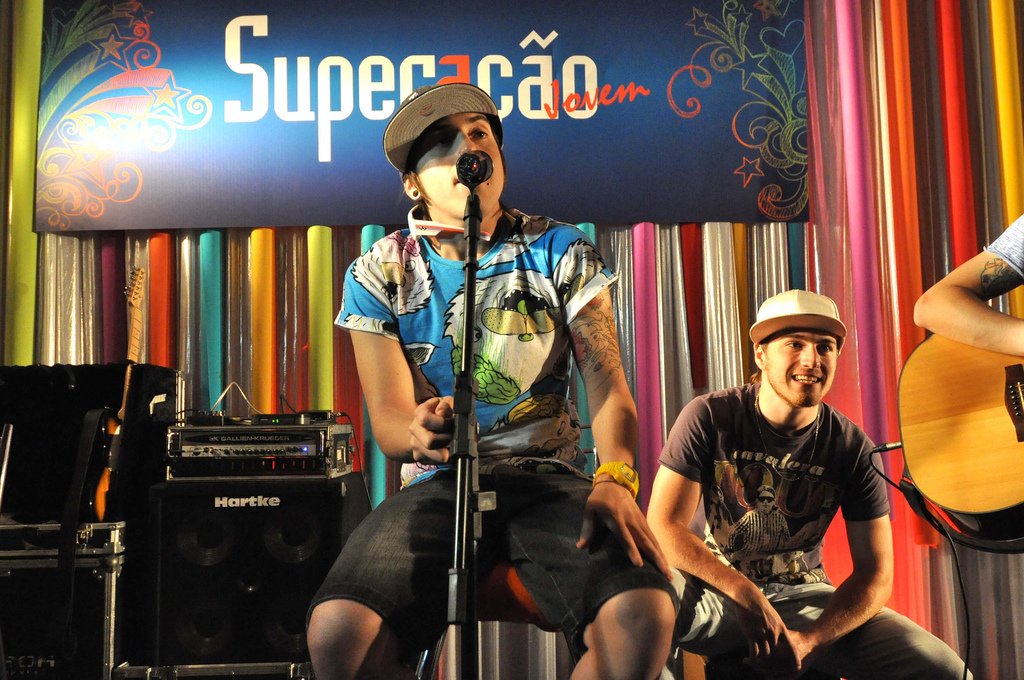
- Silveira in 2010

Background information
- Born: Diego Cunha Silveira; February 20, 1987 (age 39); Jundiaí, Brazil
- Occupation: Singer
- Spouse: Bruna Unzueta 2015-2018

Diego Cunha Silveira (born February 20, 1987), best known as DH Silveira, is a Brazilian singer. He is known as the lead singer of the band Cine, and winner of the seventh season of the Brazilian version of The Farm.

== Career ==
From 2007 to 2016, he was the lead singer of the pop rock band Cine.

== A Fazenda 7 ==
On September 14, 2014, the lead singer of Cine has been confirmed as one of the seventeen competitors of the seventh season of The Farm.

On December 10, 2014, after 90 days of confinement, he was crowned winner of the season, beating the model Babi Rossi and socialite Heloisa Faissol the final vote, taking the prize of 2 million reais home.

Trivia

- He is the first and only finalist who won without passing by a vote of elimination.

Preceded by Bárbara Evans	Winner of A Fazenda; A Fazenda 7	Succeeded by Douglas Sampaio
