= A Fazenda 7 =

Season of television series

- Season 7
- Hosted by: Britto Júnior
- No. of days: 90
- No. of contestants: 17
- Winner: DH Silveira
- Runner-up: Babi Rossi
- Companion show: A Fazenda Online
- No. of episodes: 87

Release
- Original network: RecordTV
- Original release: September 14 – December 10, 2014

Season chronology
- ← Previous; A Fazenda 6 Next → A Fazenda 8

A Fazenda 7 was the seventh season of the Brazilian reality television series A Fazenda, which premiered on Sunday, September 14, 2014, on RecordTV. It was hosted by Britto Júnior, reports by Dani Duf and commanded by Gianne Albertoni and Carla Diaz on A Fazenda Online.

Britto Junior reprise his hosting stints for the show. Gianne Albertoni also returned as the show's commander on A Fazenda Online, being also entered by actress Carla Diaz on A Fazenda Online. A Fazenda 7 was officially confirmed on September 29, 2013, during the season finale of A Fazenda 6. The grand prize was of R$2 million without tax allowances, with a brand new car offered to the runner-up.

On December 10, 2014, 27-year-old cine vocalist DH Silveira won the competition with 44.38% of the public vote over former panicat | São Paulo Babi Rossi (37.05%) and socialite Heloisa Faissol (18.57%).

== Overview ==
=== Cast ===
Pre-production started early to mid-February 2014. Casting was done simultaneously with casting for Aprendiz Celebridades, the tenth season of O Aprendiz, the Brazilian version of The Apprentice, that was being adapted to the Celebrity Apprentice format at the time. The season featured eighteen new celebrities.

== Twists ==
=== The camp ===
A half-day prior to the game officially starting, the cast was led to believe that they would enter directly into the Farm. They were, however, placed at an isolated camp miles away from the actual Farm. At the camp, contestants must create their own society, built their own shelter and figure out how to survive against the elements, while given minimal resources.

After nightfall, the contestants took part of a Bonfire ceremony, where each one should speak and then symbolically burn what they want to leave behind.

=== The twins ===
For the first time ever in a Brazilian reality show, two contestants (similar twins Pepê and Neném) will play the game as a single competitor.

== Contestants ==
On February 2, 2017, approximately two years after the show, contestant Heloísa Faissol was found dead in her apartment aged 46.

Biographical information according to Record official series site, plus footnoted additions.
(ages stated are at time of contest)

Contestant	Age	Background	Hometown	Week 1 team	Week 3 team	Week 8 team	Merged team	Status	Finish
Oscar Maroni	63	Businessman	Jundiaí	Rabbit				Eliminated 1st on October 2, 2014	17th
Diego Cristo	35	Actor	Ponta Grossa	Sheep	Sheep			Eliminated 2nd on October 9, 2014	16th
Roy Rosselló	44	Former Menudo	Río Piedras, Puerto Rico	Ostrich	Ostrich			Eliminated 3rd on October 16, 2014	15th
Lorena Bueri	26	Model	São Paulo	Sheep	Sheep			Eliminated 4th on October 23, 2014	14th
Cristina Mortágua	44	Model	Rio de Janeiro	No Team	Sheep			Eliminated 5th on October 30, 2014	13th
Robson Caetano	50	Olympic medalist	Rio de Janeiro	Rabbit	Rabbit	Rabbit		Eliminated 6th on November 6, 2014	12th
Felipeh Campos	40	Journalist	São Paulo	Sheep	Sheep	Sheep		Eliminated 7th on November 13, 2014	11th
Débora Lyra	26	Miss Brasil 2010	Vitória	Rabbit	Rabbit	Ostrich		Eliminated 8th on November 18, 2014	10th
Bruna Tang	35	Singer & TV Host	Belo Horizonte	Sheep	Sheep	Sheep		Eliminated 9th on November 20, 2014	9th
Marlos Cruz	35	Model & Actor	Rio de Janeiro	Ostrich	Ostrich	Ostrich	Final Eight	Eliminated 10th on November 25, 2014	8th
MC Brunninha	21	Funk singer	Rio de Janeiro	Ostrich	Ostrich	Ostrich	Final Eight	Eliminated 11th on November 27, 2014	7th
Andréia Sorvetão	42	Former Paquita	Rio de Janeiro	Ostrich	Ostrich	Rabbit	Final Eight	Eliminated 12th on December 2, 2014	6th
Leo Rodriguez	25	Sertanejo singer	Descalvado	Sheep	Sheep	Sheep	Final Eight	Eliminated 13th on December 4, 2014	5th
Pepê & Neném	39	Singers	Rio de Janeiro	No Team	Rabbit	Rabbit	Final Eight	Eliminated 14th on December 7, 2014	4th
Heloisa Faissol	44	Socialite	Rio de Janeiro	Rabbit	Rabbit	Rabbit	Final Eight	Third place on December 10, 2014	3rd
Babi Rossi	24	Former Panicat	São Paulo	Rabbit	Rabbit	Rabbit	Final Eight	Runner-up on December 10, 2014	2nd
DH Silveira	27	Cine Vocalist	São Paulo	Ostrich	Ostrich	Ostrich	Final Eight	Winner on December 10, 2014	1st

== Future appearances ==
In 2016, Andréia Sorvetão appeared with her husband Conrado in Power Couple Brasil 1, they finished in 4th place in the competition.

In 2017, Diego Cristo and Lorena Bueri appeared as a couple in Power Couple Brasil 2, they finished in 10th place in the competition.

In 2021, Robson Caetano appeared in Dança dos Famosos 18, in an all stars season, he finished in 12th place in the competition.

In 2023, Léo Rodriguez appeared on A Grande Conquista 1, he have to compete for a place to enter in the game and he didn't enter.

== The game ==
=== Key power ===
Since season 5, contestants compete to win the Key Power each week. The Key Power holder is the only contestant who can open the mystery box located at the Farm. However, opening the box will unleash either a good consequence or a bad consequence at the nomination process.

Since season 6, only three pre-selected contestants (one from each team) are allowed to compete each round. However, this season, one of the three is banned from competing by the current Farmer of the Week, leaving only two players at the challenge. The winner becomes the Key Power holder for the week, while the loser is sent to the barn with his whole team (minus the current Farmer if he/she is part of that team) until the vote. The Key Holder's choice is marked in bold.

In week 11, only the team with more members at this point of the game (Rabbit) competed for the Special Key Power and the other contestants were sent to the Barn.

Results

Week	Players	Winner	Sent to the Barn	Consequences
2	DH	Bruna	Team Ostrich: Andréia, Brunninha, DH, ~~Marlos~~, Roy	Choose one contestant to win an immunity (**Lorena**) and ban another contestant from nominating (**DH**); Choose one contestant to join her team: **Cristina** or Pepê & Neném.
2	Bruna	Bruna	Team Ostrich: Andréia, Brunninha, DH, ~~Marlos~~, Roy	Choose one contestant to win an immunity (**Lorena**) and ban another contestant from nominating (**DH**); Choose one contestant to join her team: **Cristina** or Pepê & Neném.
2	~~Débora~~	Bruna	Team Ostrich: Andréia, Brunninha, DH, ~~Marlos~~, Roy	Choose one contestant to win an immunity (**Lorena**) and ban another contestant from nominating (**DH**); Choose one contestant to join her team: **Cristina** or Pepê & Neném.
3	Marlos	Leo	Team Ostrich: Andréia, Brunninha, DH, Marlos, Roy	Nominate a contestant from Team Ostrich automatically for eviction (**Roy**)
3	Leo	Leo	Team Ostrich: Andréia, Brunninha, DH, Marlos, Roy	Nominate a contestant from Team Ostrich automatically for eviction (**Roy**)
3	~~Robson~~	Leo	Team Ostrich: Andréia, Brunninha, DH, Marlos, Roy	Nominate a contestant from Team Ostrich automatically for eviction (**Roy**)
4	Roy	Roy	Team Rabbit: Babi, Débora, Heloisa, Pepê & Neném, ~~Robson~~	Immunity; Choose one contestant from the Barn to win an immunity (**Débora**)
4	~~Diego~~	Roy	Team Rabbit: Babi, Débora, Heloisa, Pepê & Neném, ~~Robson~~	Immunity; Choose one contestant from the Barn to win an immunity (**Débora**)
4	Neném	Roy	Team Rabbit: Babi, Débora, Heloisa, Pepê & Neném, ~~Robson~~	Immunity; Choose one contestant from the Barn to win an immunity (**Débora**)
5	Andréia	Andréia	Team Rabbit: Babi, Débora, ~~Heloisa~~, Pepê & Neném, Robson	The excluded team from the Key power challenge become immune (**Sheep**); Choose one member from the Rabbit team to make his vote count as two points (**Babi**)
5	~~Lorena~~	Andréia	Team Rabbit: Babi, Débora, ~~Heloisa~~, Pepê & Neném, Robson	The excluded team from the Key power challenge become immune (**Sheep**); Choose one member from the Rabbit team to make his vote count as two points (**Babi**)
5	Débora	Andréia	Team Rabbit: Babi, Débora, ~~Heloisa~~, Pepê & Neném, Robson	The excluded team from the Key power challenge become immune (**Sheep**); Choose one member from the Rabbit team to make his vote count as two points (**Babi**)
6	Brunninha	Brunninha	Team Rabbit: Babi, Débora, Heloisa, Pepê & Neném, ~~Robson~~	Choose two contestants from the Barn to win an immunity (**Babi** and **Heloisa**); Replace the contestant nominated by the twist (**Pepê & Neném**) by another who is not immune (**Lorena**)
6	~~Bruna~~	Brunninha	Team Rabbit: Babi, Débora, Heloisa, Pepê & Neném, ~~Robson~~	Choose two contestants from the Barn to win an immunity (**Babi** and **Heloisa**); Replace the contestant nominated by the twist (**Pepê & Neném**) by another who is not immune (**Lorena**)
6	Babi	Brunninha	Team Rabbit: Babi, Débora, Heloisa, Pepê & Neném, ~~Robson~~	Choose two contestants from the Barn to win an immunity (**Babi** and **Heloisa**); Replace the contestant nominated by the twist (**Pepê & Neném**) by another who is not immune (**Lorena**)
7	DH	Leo	Team Ostrich: Andréia, Brunninha, DH, Marlos	Choose two contestants to win an immunity (**Felipeh** and **Robson**); Contestants from the Barn (**Ostrich**) are immune in the twist
7	Leo	Leo	Team Ostrich: Andréia, Brunninha, DH, Marlos	Choose two contestants to win an immunity (**Felipeh** and **Robson**); Contestants from the Barn (**Ostrich**) are immune in the twist
7	~~Robson~~	Leo	Team Ostrich: Andréia, Brunninha, DH, Marlos	Choose two contestants to win an immunity (**Felipeh** and **Robson**); Contestants from the Barn (**Ostrich**) are immune in the twist
8	~~Marlos~~	Bruna	Team Rabbit: Andréia, Babi, Heloisa, ~~Pepê & Neném~~, Robson	Immunity; Choose between win an **immunity for your team** or win R$10,000; The team in the Barn should choose one team member to win an immunity (**Babi**) and another automatically for eviction (**Andréia**)
8	Bruna	Bruna	Team Rabbit: Andréia, Babi, Heloisa, ~~Pepê & Neném~~, Robson	Immunity; Choose between win an **immunity for your team** or win R$10,000; The team in the Barn should choose one team member to win an immunity (**Babi**) and another automatically for eviction (**Andréia**)
8	Robson	Bruna	Team Rabbit: Andréia, Babi, Heloisa, ~~Pepê & Neném~~, Robson	Immunity; Choose between win an **immunity for your team** or win R$10,000; The team in the Barn should choose one team member to win an immunity (**Babi**) and another automatically for eviction (**Andréia**)
9	Marlos	Marlos	Team Rabbit: ~~Andréia~~, Babi, Heloisa, Pepê & Neném	Choose between nominate a contestant automatically for eviction and he win a brand new car or **be automatically nominated and win a brand new car to himself**; Choose one contestant from the Barn to win an immunity (**Heloisa**)
9	~~Leo~~	Marlos	Team Rabbit: ~~Andréia~~, Babi, Heloisa, Pepê & Neném	Choose between nominate a contestant automatically for eviction and he win a brand new car or **be automatically nominated and win a brand new car to himself**; Choose one contestant from the Barn to win an immunity (**Heloisa**)
9	Babi	Marlos	Team Rabbit: ~~Andréia~~, Babi, Heloisa, Pepê & Neném	Choose between nominate a contestant automatically for eviction and he win a brand new car or **be automatically nominated and win a brand new car to himself**; Choose one contestant from the Barn to win an immunity (**Heloisa**)
10	DH	DH	Team Rabbit: Andréia, Babi, Heloisa, Pepê & Neném	Immunity and ban one contestant from the Barn to nominate (**Babi**); Won the Farmer of Week status; The last contestant saved from eviction was exempt from nominations (**Babi**)
10	~~Bruna~~	DH	Team Rabbit: Andréia, Babi, Heloisa, Pepê & Neném	Immunity and ban one contestant from the Barn to nominate (**Babi**); Won the Farmer of Week status; The last contestant saved from eviction was exempt from nominations (**Babi**)
10	Heloisa	DH	Team Rabbit: Andréia, Babi, Heloisa, Pepê & Neném	Immunity and ban one contestant from the Barn to nominate (**Babi**); Won the Farmer of Week status; The last contestant saved from eviction was exempt from nominations (**Babi**)
11	Team Rabbit	Heloisa	Brunninha, DH, Leo, Marlos	Choose a former teammate to win a car (**Babi**); Won a free pass to the final; Choose, as a group, a contestant from the Barn to be nominated (**Leo**); Choose which envelope, the purple (**Leo**) or the orange (**Marlos**) each nominee should open it when returning from eviction.
12	Final Six	Leo	Andréia, Babi, DH, Heloisa, Leo, Pepê & Neném	Replace one nominee (Babi or **Pepê & Neném**) by another contestant (**Andréia**); All contestants were sent to the Barn (chosen by the Instant Choice of the public)

=== Instant choice ===
The Instant Choice was introduced during the first live nominations show of the season as an added interactive feature. During the designated/announced five-minute voting window, Twitter users (with public accounts only) may vote to select a contestant to receive a special opportunity not available to others (which may or may not influence directly in the game) by tweeting the option's keyword along with the show's designated hashtag.

Week	Player	Question	Options	Vote	Brazil's choice
2	Bruna	Bruna should open the red envelope and win a brand new car?	Yes	28%	No
2	Bruna	Bruna should open the red envelope and win a brand new car?	No	72%	No
3	Leo	Leo should open the red envelope and give an immunity to another player?	Yes	22%	No
3	Leo	Leo should open the red envelope and give an immunity to another player?	No	78%	No
4	Roy	Roy should open the red envelope and have his nomination cancelled?	Yes	58%	Yes
4	Roy	Roy should open the red envelope and have his nomination cancelled?	No	42%	Yes
5	Andréia	Andréia should open the red envelope and win a brand new car?	Yes	60%	Yes
5	Andréia	Andréia should open the red envelope and win a brand new car?	No	40%	Yes
6	Brunninha	Brunninha should open the red envelope and thus, have to sleep outside and do all the work on the farm for a day along with her team?	Yes	58%	Yes
6	Brunninha	Brunninha should open the red envelope and thus, have to sleep outside and do all the work on the farm for a day along with her team?	No	42%	Yes
7	Leo	Leo should open the red envelope and win a helicopter tour with a guest?	Yes	41%	No
7	Leo	Leo should open the red envelope and win a helicopter tour with a guest?	No	59%	No
8	Bruna	Bruna should open the red envelope and win a trip to the cinema with two guests from other teams?	Yes	38%	No
8	Bruna	Bruna should open the red envelope and win a trip to the cinema with two guests from other teams?	No	62%	No
9	Marlos	Marlos should open the red envelope and earn a time off from work in the farm the day after the party with his team?	Yes	59%	Yes
9	Marlos	Marlos should open the red envelope and earn a time off from work in the farm the day after the party with his team?	No	41%	Yes
10	DH	DH should open the red envelope and have the opportunity to give a trip to Las Vegas for a contestant from another team?	Yes	59%	Yes
10	DH	DH should open the red envelope and have the opportunity to give a trip to Las Vegas for a contestant from another team?	No	41%	Yes
10	DH	DH should open the purple envelope and exempt the contestant saved from the eviction from the nominations?	Yes	89.69%	Yes
10	DH	DH should open the purple envelope and exempt the contestant saved from the eviction from the nominations?	No	10.31%	Yes
12	Leo	Leo should open the red envelope and go with all contestants to the Barn for an indefinite period?	Yes	52%	Yes
12	Leo	Leo should open the red envelope and go with all contestants to the Barn for an indefinite period?	No	48%	Yes

== Voting history ==
	Week 2	Week 3	Week 4	Week 5	Week 6	Week 7	Week 8	Week 9	Week 10		Week 11		Week 12		Week 13	
	Week 2	Week 3	Week 4	Week 5	Week 6	Week 7	Week 8	Week 9	Day 67	Day 68	Day 74	Day 76	Day 81	Day 82	Day 85	Finale
Farmer of the Week	Marlos	Diego	Robson	Heloisa	Robson	Bruna	Pepê & Neném	Andréia	Marlos	DH	(none)			(none)		
Nominated (Farmer)	Heloisa	Oscar	Diego	Roy	Bruna	Heloisa	Débora	Felipeh	Babi	Bruna	(none)			(none)		
Nominated (House)	Diego	Robson	Felipeh	Marlos	Felipeh	Cristina	Robson	Leo	Débora	Leo	Marlos	Brunninha	Babi	(none)		
Nominated (Twist)	Roy	Roy	Heloisa	Robson	Lorena	Pepê & Neném	Andréia	Marlos	(none)		Leo	Pepê & Neném	Andréia	(none)		
DH	Banned	Robson	Felipeh	Débora	Felipeh	Cristina	Robson	Leo	Bruna	Farmer of the Week	Marlos	Andréia	Babi	Saved	Saved	Winner (Day 90)
Babi	Diego	Robson	Felipeh	Marlos; Marlos	Felipeh	Marlos	Robson	Leo	Banned	Exempt	Marlos	Brunninha	DH	Nominee	Nominee	Runner-up (Day 90)
Heloisa	Diego	Robson	Felipeh	Farmer of the Week	Felipeh	Marlos	Robson	Leo	Débora	Leo	Marlos	Brunninha	DH	Exempt	Exempt	3rd Place (Day 90)
Pepê & Neném	Diego	Robson	Felipeh	Marlos	Felipeh	Cristina	Farmers of the Week	Leo	Débora	Leo	Marlos	Andréia	Babi	Saved	Nominees	Evicted (Day 87)
Leo	Oscar	Pepê & Neném	Felipeh	Marlos	Pepê & Neném	Cristina	DH	Babi	Pepê & Neném	Brunninha	Pepê & Neném	Exempt	Babi	Nominee	Pepê & Neném	Evicted (Day 84)
Andréia	Diego	Robson	Felipeh	Robson	Felipeh	Cristina	Robson	Farmer of the Week	Débora	Leo	Pepê & Neném	Brunninha	DH	Evicted (Day 82)	Pepê & Neném	
Brunninha	Diego	Robson	Felipeh	Robson	Felipeh	Cristina	Robson	Bruna	Bruna	Leo	Babi	Andréia	Evicted (Day 77)		Babi	
Marlos	Farmer of the Week	Robson	Felipeh	Robson	Felipeh	Babi	Robson	Leo	Farmer of the Week	Leo	Babi	Evicted (Day 75)			Pepê & Neném	
Bruna	Oscar	Pepê & Neném	Felipeh	DH	Débora	Farmer of the Week	DH	Babi	Débora	Brunninha	Evicted (Day 70)				DH	
Débora	Diego	Robson	Felipeh	Brunninha	Felipeh	Cristina	Robson	Bruna	Andréia	Evicted (Day 68)					Pepê & Neném	
Felipeh	Oscar	Pepê & Neném	Lorena	DH	Pepê & Neném	Brunninha	DH	Babi	Evicted (Day 63)						DH	
Robson	Diego	Felipeh	Farmer of the Week	Marlos	Farmer of the Week	Cristina	Marlos	Evicted (Day 56)							DH	
Cristina	Oscar	Roy	Felipeh	Pepê & Neném	DH	DH	Evicted (Day 49)								DH	
Lorena	Oscar	Pepê & Neném	Felipeh	DH	Pepê & Neném	Evicted (Day 42)									DH	
Roy	Diego	Robson	~~Lorena~~	Babi	Evicted (Day 35)										Pepê & Neném	
Diego	Oscar	Farmer of the Week	DH	Evicted (Day 28)											DH	
Oscar	Diego	Bruna	Evicted (Day 21)												Pepê & Neném	
Notes	1, 2, 3, 4	5	6, 7	8, 9	10, 11	12, 13	14	15	16		17, 18, 19	20, 21	22, 23, 24	25	26, 27, 28	29
Up for Nomination	Diego; Heloisa; Roy	Oscar; Robson; Roy	Diego; Felipeh; Heloisa	Marlos; Robson; Roy	Bruna; Felipeh; Lorena	Cristina; Heloisa; Pepê & Neném	Andréia; Débora; Robson	Felipeh; Leo; Marlos	(none)							
Saved	Diego	Robson	Heloisa	Robson	Bruna	Pepê & Neném	Andréia	Marlos	(none)							
Nominated for Eviction	Heloisa; Roy	Oscar; Roy	Diego; Felipeh	Marlos; Roy	Felipeh; Lorena	Cristina; Heloisa	Débora; Robson	Felipeh; Leo	Babi; Débora	Bruna; Leo	Leo; Marlos	Brunninha; Pepê & Neném	Andréia; Babi	Babi; Leo	Babi; Pepê & Neném	Babi; DH; Heloisa
Evicted	Eviction canceled	Oscar; 40.75% to save	Diego; 24.76% to save	Roy; 20.72% to save	Lorena; 47.61% to save	Cristina; 27.91% to save	Robson; 39.80% to save	Felipeh; 17.73% to save	Débora; 48.03% to save	Bruna; 11.98% to save	Marlos; 26.87% to save	Brunninha; 44.28% to save	Andréia; 24.40% to save	Leo; 37.58% to save	Pepê & Neném; 34.86% to save	Heloisa; 18.57% to win
Evicted	Eviction canceled	Oscar; 40.75% to save	Diego; 24.76% to save	Roy; 20.72% to save	Lorena; 47.61% to save	Cristina; 27.91% to save	Robson; 39.80% to save	Felipeh; 17.73% to save	Débora; 48.03% to save	Bruna; 11.98% to save	Marlos; 26.87% to save	Brunninha; 44.28% to save	Andréia; 24.40% to save	Leo; 37.58% to save	Pepê & Neném; 34.86% to save	Babi; 37.05% to win
Evicted	Eviction canceled	Oscar; 40.75% to save	Diego; 24.76% to save	Roy; 20.72% to save	Lorena; 47.61% to save	Cristina; 27.91% to save	Robson; 39.80% to save	Felipeh; 17.73% to save	Débora; 48.03% to save	Bruna; 11.98% to save	Marlos; 26.87% to save	Brunninha; 44.28% to save	Andréia; 24.40% to save	Leo; 37.58% to save	Pepê & Neném; 34.86% to save	DH; 44.38% to win

=== Notes ===
- ^Note 1 : Due to entering the house on day 5, the twins Pepê & Neném guaranteed immunity for the first nominations on week 2. Same as Cristina as she was the only one not to be chosen by any team. However, both had to live in the Barn for some days.
- ^Note 2 : Key Power holder Bruna opened the mystery box, which contained three envelopes: the red envelope, the envelope #1 and the envelope #2. Bruna was forbidden to open the red envelope through the Instant Choice of the public. The envelope #1 was opened and revealed that she had to choose one contestant to win an immunity and ban another contestant from nominating. She gave immunity to Lorena and banned DH. After the vote, Bruna opened the envelope #2, which asked her to choose between Cristina and Pepê & Neném to join her team (Sheep) as an extra member. She picked Cristina.
- ^Note 3 : The eleven remaining eligible contestants were asked to save one contestant. The second nominee Diego was asked to start and he saved Leo, who saved Bruna, who saved Felipeh, who saved Débora, who saved Babi, who saved Oscar, who saved Robson, who saved Brunninha, who saved Andréia, who saved DH, leaving Roy as the third nominee.
- ^Note 4 : On the morning of Day 14, Roy was temporarily expelled from the Farm, after a remand ordered for non-payment of child support was issued by the authorities. Since Roy was one of the two nominees, the voting lines were frozen. During the afternoon, the debt of R$18,000 was finally paid, allowing Roy to return to the Farm during the live show. Due to the unprecedented nature of the events the eviction was canceled.
- ^Note 5 : Key Power holder Leo opened the mystery box, which contained two envelopes: the red envelope and the main envelope. Leo was forbidden to open the red envelope through the Instant Choice of the public. After the vote, Leo opened the main envelope, which revealed that he should choose one contestant from the barn (team Ostrich) to be the third nominee. He choose Roy.
- ^Note 6 : Key Power holder Roy opened the mystery box, which contained two envelopes: the red envelope and the main envelope. The main envelope was opened and revealed that Roy won immunity and had to choose another contestant between the ones in the barn (team Rabbit) to be immune as well. He chose Débora. Then, Roy was allowed to open the red envelope through the Instant Choice of the public and got his nomination cancelled.
- ^Note 7 : The eleven remaining eligible contestants were asked to save one contestant. The second nominee Felipeh was asked to start and he saved Bruna, who saved Lorena, who saved Leo, who saved Cristina, who saved Andréia, who saved Brunninha, who saved Pepê & Neném, who saved DH, who saved Marlos, who saved Babi, leaving Heloisa as the third nominee.
- ^Note 8 : Key Power holder Andréia opened the mystery box, which contained two envelopes: the red envelope and the main envelope. Andréia was allowed to open the red envelope through the Instant Choice of the public and won a brand new car. The main envelope was opened and revealed that the team that wasn't sent to the barn (Sheep) won immunity this week. Then, Andréia had to choose one contestant between the ones in the barn (team Rabbit) to have his nomination counted as two. She choose Babi, so her vote on Marlos counted as two votes for him.
- ^Note 9 : The seven remaining eligible contestants were asked to save one contestant. The second nominee Marlos was asked to start and he saved Andréia, who saved DH, who saved Brunninha, who saved Pepê & Neném, who saved Débora, who saved Babi, leaving Robson as the third nominee.
- ^Note 10 : Key Power holder Brunninha opened the first envelope and was informed that she should give an immunity for two contestants who were in the Barn. She chose Babi and Heloisa.
- ^Note 11 : The nine remaining eligible contestants were asked to save one contestant. The second nominee Felipeh was asked to start and he saved Leo, who saved Lorena, who saved Cristina, who saved DH, who saved Andréia, who saved Brunninha, who saved Marlos, who saved Débora, leaving the twins Pepê & Neném as the third nominee. However, Brunninha opened the second and last envelope, which said she should take the third nominee from nomination and replace them by another contestant who were not immune. Brunninha chose to put Lorena up for nomination.
- ^Note 12 : Key Power holder Leo opened the first envelope and was informed that he should give an immunity for two contestants. He chose Felipeh and Robson.
- ^Note 13 : The four remaining eligible contestants were asked to save one contestant (Team Ostrich did not participate according to the second envelope on the Key Power). The second nominee Cristina was asked to start and she saved Babi, who saved Débora, who saved Leo, leaving the twins Pepê & Neném as the third nominee.
- ^Note 14 : Key Power holder Bruna opened the first envelope and was informed that she was immune and should choose between give an immunity for your team (Sheep) or win a R$10,000 prize money. She chose the immunity. The second envelope was informed that the contestants who were in the Barn (team Rabbit) should choose a team member to win an immunity (Babi) and another to be automatically nominated (Andréia).
- ^Note 15 : Key Power holder Marlos opened the first envelope and was informed that he should choose between nominate a contestant automatically for eviction and he win a brand new car or be automatically nominated and win a brand new car to himself. He chose the latter and was automatically nominated. The second envelope was informed that he should give an immunity for one contestant who were in the Barn. He chose Heloisa.
- ^Note 16 : Key Power holder DH opened the first envelope and was informed that he gained an immunity and ban another contestant from nominating (Babi). The second envelope was informed that he would be the last "Farmer of the Week". In the nominations on the following day he opened a third envelope (for this, the public should vote yes or no to open. The majority chose yes.) and was informed that the last contestant saved from eviction (Babi) was exempt from nominations.
- ^Note 17 : From this point on, there will be no Farmer of Week in the game. In an event of a tie, the current Key Power holder will have the casting vote.
- ^Note 18 : Key Power holder Heloisa opened the super special mystery box which contained five develops, however, only the first three would be applicable for this round's voting. Heloisa opened the first envelope and was required to choose one contestant to win a brand new car (Babi). Then, the second envelope revealed that she won a free pass to the final. Finally, in the third envelope she was informed that should choose, with Andréia, Babi and Pepê & Neném, a contestant from the Barn to be automatically nominated (Leo).
- ^Note 19 : After the vote, Heloisa was asked in private by host Britto Jr., to deliver each one of the two remaining envelopes in the box (the orange and the purple envelopes) to the two nominees (Leo and Marlos), already knowing the content inside them. Only one envelope would be open in the next round's voting, by the contestat who survives the eviction. Heloisa decided to give the purple to Leo (immunity and the power to nominate another contestant automatically for eviction) and the orange to Marlos (automatically nominated and the power to give immunity to another contestant).
- ^Note 20 : After surviving the tenth eviction, Leo was banned from the eleventh's house vote through the Instant Choice of the public. However, he played his purple envelope in the nominations, won immunity and choose the twins Pepê & Neném to be automatically nominated.
- ^Note 21 : Andréia and Brunninha received the most nominations with 3 each. Heloisa, as Key Power holder, had the casting vote and chose Brunninha to be the second nominee.
- ^Note 22 : Babi and DH received the most nominations with 3 each. Leo, as Key Power holder, had the casting vote and chose Babi to be the first nominee.
- ^Note 23 : The four remaining eligible contestants were asked to save one contestant. The first nominee Babi was asked to start and she saved Andréia, who saved Leo, who saved DH, leaving the twins Pepê & Neném as the second nominee.
- ^Note 24 : Key Power holder Leo opened the mystery box which contained two envelopes. In the first envelope, he was informed that he should replace one of the nominees with one eligible contestant (Andréia or DH). He saved twins Pepê & Neném and chose Andréia to replace them. Then, he was allowed to open the red envelope through the Instant Choice of the public, so all contestants were sent to the barn.
- ^Note 25 : The four eligible contestants competed in a special nomination challenge. Leo and Babi were eliminated in the first and second places respectively and became the nominees.
- ^Note 26 : Each semi-finalist was asked to choose an evicted contestant (exempting Andréia and Marlon, which already had won a car) to win a brand new car. The chosen ones were: Débora (by Babi), Brunninha (by DH), Cristina (by Heloisa) and Robson (by Pepê & Neném). Then, the viewers were asked to vote for one of them to win the prize, where Débora won.
- ^Note 27 : On day 85, all evicted contestants returned to the farm to choose the first nominee. In the vote, both DH and Pepê & Neném received 6 votes each. Débora, for being chosen to win a prize by viewers, had to cast the vote to break the tie. She chose Pepê & Neném to be the first nominee.
- ^Note 28 : Due to being nominated, only Pepê & Neném were eligible to nominate. They choose Babi to be the second nominee, therefore, DH automatically became a finalist.
- ^Note 29 : For the final, the public votes for the contestant they want to win A Fazenda 7.

== Ratings ==
=== Brazilian ratings ===
All numbers are in points and provided by IBOPE.

First air date	SUN	MON	TUE	WED	THU	FRI	SAT	Weekly average
09/14 to September 20, 2014	12	09	07	10	09	10	10	10
09/21 to September 27, 2014	07	08	08	09	09	—	09	08
09/28 to April 10, 2014	—	08	09	10	07	08	09	09
10/05 to November 10, 2014	09	08	09	10	08	07	09	09
10/12 to October 18, 2014	08	09	09	09	09	08	10	09
10/19 to October 25, 2014	—	10	10	10	09	08	10	09
10/26 to January 11, 2014	07	08	10	09	09	08	09	09
11/02 to August 11, 2014	08	09	10	10	09	08	07	09
11/09 to November 15, 2014	07	09	09	10	09	08	10	09
11/16 to November 22, 2014	08	09	09	11	09	07	10	09
11/23 to November 29, 2014	07	09	08	11	09	10	10	09
11/30 to June 12, 2014	07	10	10	09	09	09	10	09
12/07 to October 12, 2014	09	08	09	11	—	—	—	09
09/14 to October 12, 2014	Season Average							09

- In 2014, each point represents 65.000 households in São Paulo.

Notes

- Episode 13 aired on September 26 as a 15-minute special due to the Governor's debates on Record.
- Episode 15 aired on September 28 as a 30-minute special due to the first Presidential debate on Record, which delayed the show to a late-night timeslot.
- Episode 36 aired on October 19 as a 30-minute special due to the second Presidential debate on Record, which delayed the show to a late-night timeslot.
