= Muito Show =

- Genre: Talk show
- Created by: Zé Luiz
- Presented by: Zé Luiz; Íris Stefanelli; Thiago Rocha; Cacau Colluci
- Country of origin: Brazil
- Original language: Portuguese
- No. of seasons: 2

Production
- Running time: 75 minutes

Original release
- Network: RedeTV!
- Release: May 27, 2013 – May 22, 2015

Muito Show (Literally english: Much Show) is a Brazilian comedy talk show and entertainment program that has aired on RedeTV! since May 27, 2013 and ended on May 22, 2015.

The show is broadcast live weeknights at 6:30 pm (BRT/AMT tape-delayed).

== Co-hosts ==
=== Timeline ===
Co-host	Seasons		
Co-host	2013	2014	2015
Zé Luiz			
Íris Stefanelli			
Thiago Rocha			
Cacau Colluci			
Michelli Machado			
Renata del Bianco			
Patrick Maia			
Rodrigo Capella			
Babi Rossi			
Vinícius Vieira			
Andressa Urach			

== See also ==
- List of programs broadcast by RedeTV!
