= Big Brother Brasil 13 =

- Season 13
- Presented by: Pedro Bial
- No. of days: 78
- No. of housemates: 21
- Winner: Fernanda Keulla
- Runner-up: Nasser Rodrigues
- No. of episodes: 78

Release
- Original network: Globo
- Original release: January 8 – March 26, 2013

Season chronology
- ← Previous; Big Brother Brasil 12 Next → Big Brother Brasil 14

Big Brother Brasil 13 was the thirteenth season of Big Brother Brasil, which premiered January 8, 2013, and the season finale airing March 26, 2013, on the Globo television network.

The show was produced by Endemol Globo and presented by Pedro Bial. The thirteenth season was officially confirmed since March 2012 as part of a millionaire contract between international Endemol and Globo, which guaranteed seasons until 2016.

The grand prize was R$1.5 million with tax allowances, with a R$150,000 prize offered to the runner up and a R$50,000 prize offered to the 3rd placed housemate. The season was the first to be broadcast in HD and the first to be broadcast in 3D worldwide.

As part of the twist for this season, six (seven later) former housemates re-entered the Big Brother House for another chance to win the grand prize, bringing the total number of finalists to twenty-one. Fani Pacheco was the only veteran to place higher than in her original season (7th to 6th) while other returnees ranked lower.

== Production ==
=== Cast ===
Regional applications were due from March 30, 2012 to July 30, 2012. Regional auditions were held in nine different cities over Brazil.

National applications started on July 31, 2012 until October 31, 2012. The semi-finalist interviews were held in November 2012 and the final casting interviews took place early in December 2012.

== The Game ==
=== Glass House ===
On January 5, 2013, six housemates were locked for seven days in a Glass House located at Santana Parque Shopping in São Paulo. It was announced that Marcello received the most votes among the males, while Kamilla received the most votes among the females. Both therefore left the Glass House on January 11, 2013, and entered the main house on January 14, 2013.

=== Veterans vs. Newbies ===
For the first Head of Household (HoH) competition of the season, Big Brother divided the housemates into two teams: the Veterans and the Newbies. When a housemate from a team won the role of the Head of Household, then all members of that team were automatically immune from eviction.

=== Bambam's withdrawal ===
On January 12, 2013, Big Brother Brasil 1 winner and current HoH at the time, Bambam, walked out of the game. At the live show on the same day, the Veterans decided as a group that Fani would be the new HoH. Following that, Yuri Fernandes from Big Brother Brasil 12 entered the house as Bambam's replacement.

=== Power of No ===
Introduced in previous season, the Power of No still gives the Monday Game Night winner, the opportunity to disqualify a number of people (previously determined by the producers) from competing in the Head of Household competition alongside the previous HoH. This season however, started on week 4, the vetoed housemates could remove themselves from the block and compete for HoH if they win the Save Me Challenge, which takes place on Wednesdays nights.

Week	Power of No	Total vetoed	Previous HoH	Vetoed housemates	Saved housemates
2	Fernanda	4	Fani	Kamilla, Marcello, Natália, Yuri	(none)
3	Marcello	3	Ivan	Anamara, Andressa, Fernanda	(none)
4	Marien	5	Anamara	André M., Fani, Fernanda, Kamilla, Yuri	Fani
5	Fernanda	6	Marien	Anamara, Eliéser, Fani, Ivan, Nasser, Natália	Fani, Ivan, Nasser
6	Eliéser	4	Kamilla	Fani, Ivan, Marcello, Nasser	Ivan, Marcello
7	Nasser	5	Anamara	André M., Eliéser, Fani, Fernanda, Kamilla	André M., Fani
8	Fani	4	André M.	Andressa, Fernanda, Marcello, Nasser	Andressa, Nasser
9	André M.	3	Kamilla	Andressa, Nasser, Natália	Nasser, Natália
10	André M.	1	Fernanda	Nasser	(none)

=== Big Brother Back and Forth ===
On week 3, after a fake Head of Household competition, housemates were told there's gonna be a surprise eviction. The housemate with the most votes would be immediately evicted on Saturday, January 26.

In reality, the public voted for which housemate between the two fake nominees Anamara and Marcello, would enter the Secret Room and be able to watch their fellow housemates on a television screen, and then return to the house on Sunday, as the real HoH of the week. Anamara won with 57% and was fake evicted on day 19, but returned the following day during the real live nominations.

=== Big Phone ===
Week	Date	Timeslot (BRT)	Housemate	Consequences
4	February 1, 2013	Friday; 10:45pm	Eliéser	See; Note 7
5	February 8, 2013	Friday; 10:45pm	Nasser	See; Note 10
6	February 15, 2013	Friday; 10:45pm	Marcello	See; Note 11
7	February 22, 2013	Friday; 06:00am	Eliéser	See; Note 12
8	March 1, 2013	Friday; 10:45pm	André M.	See; Note 15

=== Appeared and Disappeared ===
On February 14, 2013, Big Brother revealed to the public that the first housemate to go into the pantry on Saturday, February 16, would be secretly taken out of the house for a day at a spa. Around 10:00am, Kamilla was the first to be entered the pantry and 'disappeared' from the house, leaving the remaining housemates worried about her whereabouts. At 7:00pm, producers told the housemates to pack Kamilla's belongings to lead them thinking she was out of the game. Around 11:30pm, Kamilla finally returned to the house during the Disco party and then, explained to her shocked fellow housemates what happened to her.

=== Running Against Time ===
On February 21, 2013, Big Brother revealed to the public that the Big Phone would rang on Friday, February 22 at 6:00am. Whoever answered would be automatically nominated for eviction. At 12:00pm, a giant stopwatch counting down 20 hours would be placed in the garden. On top of it there would be a button. The first housemate who pressed the button would stop the countdown and win a surprise immunity. However, if the housemate who was previously nominated by the Big Phone pressed the button, this housemate would win the immunity and choose his replacement nominee. At 6:00am, Eliéser answered the Big Phone and was automatically nominated. At 12:03pm, Fernanda pressed the button and stopped the countdown but she was only informed about her immunity during the live nominations on February 24, 2013.

=== The Mystery Box ===
On March 7, 2013, Big Brother announced the first twist of week 9. On Friday, March 8, at 12:00pm, a mystery box would be placed in the garden. To open the mystery box, the housemates would have to find the right key, between thirty hidden keys scattered throughout the outdoor area of the house. The first housemate who opened the box would win a R$10.000 cash prize, choose one housemate to be automatically nominated for eviction and veto other two housemates from the Power of Immunity competition.

The mystery box ended up being placed in the house only at 2:30pm due this week's HoH endurance competition overrun. Andressa and Kamilla found the box in the garden around 3:30pm. Andressa beat Kamilla and found right key first, winning the challenge.

=== It's Not What It Seems ===
Also on March 7, Big Brother revealed the second twist of week 9: new housemate Miguel, supposedly from Gran Hermano Argentina, entered the house on March 8. However, in reality, he was an actor working for Big Brother. His mission was told the housemates that he would choose one of them to win immunity and spend a week in the Argentinian house. The truth was partly revealed on March 10, during the live nominations. Host Pedro Bial only told the housemates that there was no immunity up for grabs and continued to hide the fact that Miguel was an actor and not a Gran Hermano housemate.

After that, Miguel left the house promising to Fani (whom he had a brief showmance) that he will wait for her outside, which she replied stating "I loved it all! I will never ever forget it. Not ever".

== Housemates ==
The newbies cast list was unveiled on January 3, 2013.

The veterans cast list was unveiled on January 8, 2013.

(ages stated at time of contest)

Name	Age	Type	Occupation	Hometown	Day entered	Day exited	Result
Fernanda Keulla	26	Newbie	Lawyer	Belo Horizonte	1	78	Winner
Nasser Rodrigues	24	Newbie	Salesman	Porto Alegre	1	78	Runner-up
Andressa Ganacin	23	Newbie	Beautician	Cianorte	1	78	Third place
Natália Casassola	27	Veteran	Model	Passo Fundo	1	76	13th Evicted
André Martinelli	24	Newbie	Businessman	Vitória	1	71	12th Evicted
Fani Pacheco	30	Veteran	TV Presenter	Nova Iguaçu	1	69	11th Evicted
Kamilla Salgado	25	Newbie	Model	Belém	7	64	10th Evicted
Anamara Barreira	28	Veteran	Former Police Officer	Juazeiro	1	57	9th Evicted
Marcello Soares	31	Newbie	Personal Trainer	Rio de Janeiro	7	55	8th Evicted
Eliéser Ambrosio	28	Veteran	Model	Maringá	1	50	7th Evicted
Ivan Marcondes	26	Newbie	English Teacher	Rio Claro	1	43	6th Evicted
Marien Carretero	25	Newbie	Flamenco Dancer	Belo Horizonte	1	36	5th Evicted
Yuri Fernandes	27	Veteran	Muay Thai Trainer	Goiânia	5	29	4th Evicted
Aslan Cabral	31	Newbie	Artist	Recife	1	22	3rd Evicted
Dhomini Ferreira	40	Veteran	Businessman	Goiânia	1	15	2nd Evicted
Aline Mattos	31	Newbie	Hostess	Rio de Janeiro	1	8	1st Evicted
Kleber Bambam	35	Veteran	DJ	Campinas	1	5	Walked
BBB Bubble
Kamilla Salgado	25	Newbie	Model	Belém	1	4	Entered Game
Marcello Soares	31	Newbie	Personal Trainer	Rio de Janeiro	1	4	Entered Game
André Coelho	25	Newbie	Lawyer	Brasília	1	4	Didn't Enter
Bernardo Lima	29	Newbie	Businessman	Florianópolis	1	4	Didn't Enter
Kelly Baron	26	Newbie	Secretary	Curitiba	1	4	Didn't Enter
Samara Pessato	30	Newbie	Saleswoman	São Paulo	1	4	Didn't Enter

== Future appearances ==
After this season, in 2013, Kelly Baron, from the glass house, appeared in Big Brother VIP from Portugal, she finished in 4th place in the competition.

In 2016, André Coelho, from the glass house, appeared in Are You the One? Brasil and on De Férias com o Ex Brazil 1 as original cast member.

In 2017, Andressa Ganacin and Nasser Rodrigues appeared as a couple in Power Couple Brasil 2, they finished in 9th place in the competition.

In 2017, Yuri Fernandes appeared in A Fazenda 9, he finished in 6th place in the competition.

In 2019, Eliéser Ambrósio and Kamilla Salgado appeared as a couple in Power Couple Brasil 4, they originally finished in 10th place, however they comeback to the game and finished in 9th place in the competition.

In 2019, André Coelho, from the glass house, appeared with his wife Clara Maia in Power Couple Brasil 4, they finished in 3rd place in the competition.

In 2020, André Martinelli appeared on Big Brother Brasil 20 as a model in an activity.

In 2021, André Martinelli appeared in No Limite 5, he finished in 3rd place in the competition.

In 2025, Dhomini Ferreira appeared with his wife Adriana Leizer in Power Couple Brasil 7, they finished as runner-up from the competition.

== Voting history ==
Key
– Newbies
– Veterans
– BBB Bubble housemates

	Week 1		Week 2	Week 3		Week 4	Week 5	Week 6	Week 7	Week 8		Week 9	Week 10		Week 11		Nominations received
	Day 1	Day 6	Week 2	Day 18	Day 20	Week 4	Week 5	Week 6	Week 7	Day 53	Day 55	Week 9	Day 67	Day 69	Day 75	Finale	Nominations received
Head of Household	(none)	~~Bambam~~; Fani	Ivan	Eliéser	Anamara	Marien	Kamilla	Anamara	André M.	Nasser	Kamilla	Fernanda	André M.	Nasser	Andressa	(none)	
Power of Immunity	(none)	(none)	Marcello	(none)	Eliéser	Nasser	Anamara	Natália	Nasser	(none)		Natália	(none)			(none)	
Saved	(none)	(none)	Kamilla	(none)	Natália	Nasser	Nasser	André M.	Andressa	(none)		Natália	(none)			(none)	
Big Phone	(none)	(none)	(none)			Eliéser	Nasser	Marcello	Eliéser	André M.	(none)	Andressa	(none)			(none)	
Nomination (Twist)	(none)	(none)	(none)			(none)	Eliéser	Eliéser	Eliéser	Marcello	(none)	Kamilla	(none)			(none)	
Nomination (HoH)	(none)	Aline	Anamara	Anamara	Aslan	Fani	Marien	Kamilla	Marcello	Fani	Nasser	Nasser	Nasser	André M.	Natália	(none)	
Nomination (Housemates)	(none)	Ivan	Dhomini	Marcello	Marcello	Marcello; Yuri	Fernanda	Ivan	Nasser	Kamilla	Anamara; Fani	Andressa	Fani	Fernanda	Fernanda	(none)	
Fernanda	BBB; House	Ivan	Marcello	Marcello	Marcello	Yuri	Fani	Ivan	Nasser	Anamara	Anamara	Head of Household	Fani	Natália	Not Eligible	Winner (Day 78)	14
Nasser	BBB; House	Aslan	Dhomini	Kamilla	Kamilla	Marcello	Fernanda	Fani	Fani	Kamilla	Fani	Fani	Fani	Fernanda	Not Eligible	Runner-Up (Day 78)	8
Andressa	BBB; House	André M.	Yuri	Marcello	Kamilla	Yuri	André M.	Marcello	Fani	Kamilla	Fani	Fani	Fani	Fernanda	Head of Household	3rd Place (Day 78)	7
Natália	BBB; House	Fernanda	André M.	Marcello	Marcello	Marcello	Marcello	Marcello	Kamilla	Kamilla	Fernanda	André M.	Fernanda	Fernanda	Fernanda	Evicted (Day 76)	6
André M.	BBB; House	Ivan	Dhomini	Marien	Marcello	Anamara	Fani	Ivan	Head of Household	Anamara	Anamara	Andressa	Head of Household	Natália	Evicted (Day 71)		12
Fani	BBB; House	Head of Household	Dhomini	Fernanda	Marien	André M.	Fernanda	Marcello	Nasser	Andressa	Andressa	Andressa	Andressa	Evicted (Day 69)			16
Kamilla	BBB; Bubble	Not in house	Marien	Marien	Yuri	Yuri	Head of Household	Ivan	Nasser	Anamara	Head of Household	Andressa	Evicted (Day 64)				14
Anamara	BBB; House	Ivan	Nasser	Marcello	Marcello	Marcello	Marcello	Head of Household	Kamilla	Kamilla	André M.	Evicted (Day 57)					9
Marcello	BBB; Bubble	Not in house	Dhomini	Fernanda	Fernanda	Natalia	Anamara	Natalia	Fani	André M.	Evicted (Day 55)						21
Eliéser	BBB; House	Ivan	Dhomini	Head of Household	Fani	Marcello	Ivan	Ivan	Nasser	Evicted (Day 50)							3
Ivan	BBB; House	Aslan	Head of Household	Kamilla	Kamilla	Eliéser	Fernanda	Natália	Evicted (Day 43)								10
Marien	BBB; House	André M.	Yuri	Kamilla	André M.	Head of Household	Fernanda	Evicted (Day 36)									6
Yuri	Not in house	André M.	Eliéser	Kamilla	Marien	Marcello	Evicted (Day 29)										6
Aslan	BBB; House	Ivan	Dhomini	Marcello	Andressa	Evicted (Day 22)											3
Dhomini	BBB; House	André M.	Eliéser	Evicted (Day 15)													6
Aline	BBB; House	Fernanda	Evicted (Day 8)														1
Bambam	BBB; House	~~Head of~~ ~~Household~~	Walked (Day 5)														0
André C.	BBB; Bubble	Evicted (Bubble)															0
Bernardo	BBB; Bubble	Evicted (Bubble)															0
Kelly	BBB; Bubble	Evicted (Bubble)															0
Samara	BBB; Bubble	Evicted (Bubble)															0
Notes	1	2, 3	(none)	4	5, 6	7, 8, 9	10	11	12, 13	14, 15, 16	17	18, 19	(none)	20	21	(none)	
Nominated for Eviction	André C. Bernardo; Marcello	Aline; Ivan	Anamara; Dhomini	Anamara; Marcello	Aslan; Marcello	Fani; Marcello; Yuri	Eliéser; Fernanda; Marien	Eliéser; Ivan; Kamilla	Eliéser; Marcello; Nasser	Fani; Kamilla; Marcello	Anamara; Fani; Nasser	Andressa; Kamilla; Nasser	Fani; Nasser	André M. Fernanda	Fernanda; Natália	Andressa; Fernanda; Nasser	
Nominated for Eviction	Kamilla; Kelly; Samara	Aline; Ivan	Anamara; Dhomini	Anamara; Marcello	Aslan; Marcello	Fani; Marcello; Yuri	Eliéser; Fernanda; Marien	Eliéser; Ivan; Kamilla	Eliéser; Marcello; Nasser	Fani; Kamilla; Marcello	Anamara; Fani; Nasser	Andressa; Kamilla; Nasser	Fani; Nasser	André M. Fernanda	Fernanda; Natália	Andressa; Fernanda; Nasser	
Walked	(none)	Bambam	(none)														
Evicted	André C. Fewest votes to enter	Aline; 77% to evict	Dhomini; 54% to evict	Anamara; 57% to move	Aslan; 79% to evict	Yuri; 45.68% to evict	Marien; 51% to evict	Ivan; 48% to evict	Eliéser; 46% to evict	Marcello; 47.35% to evict	Anamara; 48% to evict	Kamilla; 68% to evict	Fani; 62% to evict	André M. 74.87% to evict	Natália; 66.39% to evict	Andressa; 8.92% to win	
Evicted	Bernardo; Fewest votes to enter	Aline; 77% to evict	Dhomini; 54% to evict	Anamara; 57% to move	Aslan; 79% to evict	Yuri; 45.68% to evict	Marien; 51% to evict	Ivan; 48% to evict	Eliéser; 46% to evict	Marcello; 47.35% to evict	Anamara; 48% to evict	Kamilla; 68% to evict	Fani; 62% to evict	André M. 74.87% to evict	Natália; 66.39% to evict	Andressa; 8.92% to win	
Evicted	Kelly; Fewest votes to enter	Aline; 77% to evict	Dhomini; 54% to evict	Anamara; 57% to move	Aslan; 79% to evict	Yuri; 45.68% to evict	Marien; 51% to evict	Ivan; 48% to evict	Eliéser; 46% to evict	Marcello; 47.35% to evict	Anamara; 48% to evict	Kamilla; 68% to evict	Fani; 62% to evict	André M. 74.87% to evict	Natália; 66.39% to evict	Nasser; 28.29% to win	
Evicted	Samara; Fewest votes to enter	Aline; 77% to evict	Dhomini; 54% to evict	Anamara; 57% to move	Aslan; 79% to evict	Yuri; 45.68% to evict	Marien; 51% to evict	Ivan; 48% to evict	Eliéser; 46% to evict	Marcello; 47.35% to evict	Anamara; 48% to evict	Kamilla; 68% to evict	Fani; 62% to evict	André M. 74.87% to evict	Natália; 66.39% to evict	Nasser; 28.29% to win	
Survived	Marcello; Most votes to enter	Ivan; 23% to evict	Anamara; 46% to evict	Marcello; 43% to move	Marcello; 21% to evict	Marcello; 44.57% to evict	Eliéser; 41% to evict	Eliéser; 44% to evict	Nasser; 41% to evict	Kamilla; 46.55% to evict	Nasser; 36% to evict	Andressa; 24% to evict	Nasser; 38% to evict	Fernanda; 25.13% to evict	Fernanda; 33.61% to evict	Fernanda; 62.79% to win	
Survived	Kamilla; Most votes to enter	Ivan; 23% to evict	Anamara; 46% to evict	Marcello; 43% to move	Marcello; 21% to evict	Fani; 9.76% to evict	Fernanda; 8% to evict	Kamilla; 8% to evict	Marcello; 13% to evict	Fani; 6.10% to evict	Fani; 16% to evict	Nasser; 8% to evict	Nasser; 38% to evict	Fernanda; 25.13% to evict	Fernanda; 33.61% to evict	Fernanda; 62.79% to win	

=== Notes ===
- ^Note 1 : André Coelho, Bernardo, Kamilla, Kelly, Marcello and Samara entered the BBB Bubble on January 5, 2013. Marcello received the most votes among the guys, while Kamilla received the most votes among the girls. Both left the BBB Bubble on January 11 and entered the Main house on January 14, 2013. The percentages were not revealed.
- ^Note 2 : During the launch night, the housemates competed in an endurance challenge for a chance to win an extra immunity. That challenge consisted of all housemates from the main house with their hands resting on 3 different cars and winner would be the last person standing. After 14 hours, newbie Nasser beat veteran Dhomini and won the immunity and the car. Before the first HoH competition took place, Nasser had to choose one housemate to receive immunity. He choose Andressa.
- ^Note 3 : During the first week when a housemate from a team wins Head of Household, then all members of that team are immune from eviction.
- ^Note 4 : Week 3 featured a fake round of nominations. The public voted for which housemate between the two nominees Anamara and Marcello, would enter the Secret Room and be able to watch their fellow housemates on a television screen, and then return to the house on Sunday, as the real HoH of the week. Anamara won the vote and was fake evicted on day 19 but returned the following day during the real live nominations.
- ^Note 5 : For winning the fake HoH competition in week 3, Eliéser won an extra immunity.
- ^Note 6 : Kamilla and Marcello received the most nominations with 3 each. Anamara, as Head of Household, had the casting vote and choose Marcello to be the second nominee.
- ^Note 7 : Eliéser answered the Big Phone and had to choose one housemate to receive an extra immunity and keep this secret until the vote. For this, he should put a black necklace on his choice (Kamilla) and a white necklace in the housemate he 'wants out of the house' (Anamara) as a way to fool everyone.
- ^Note 8 : On day 23, Big Brother revealed to the audience that the winner of the Power of Immunity competition, instead of give immunity to someone else, would win the immunity. Nasser won the PoI on day 26, but the housemates were only informed about the twist during the live nominations on day 27.
- ^Note 9 : This week, 2 housemates would be nominated by the house vote but the contestants could only vote in a person who lived (that week) in the opposite house. Yuri was nominated by the rich house with 3 votes, while Marcello received 5 votes from the poor house.
- ^Note 10 : Nasser answered the Big Phone and had to choose two housemates to wear red necklaces until the vote. Elieser and Fernanda were his choices. On Sunday, he chose Elieser to be automatically nominated for eviction.
- ^Note 11 : Marcello answered the Big Phone and won the Vote Power. This power gave him two options: automatically nominate someone for eviction or transfer that vote and force the HoH to nominate two housemates. However, host Pedro Bial revealed to the public that if Marcello choose option #2, than, Marcello would be automatically nominated instead. Marcello choose option #1 and automatically nominate Eliéser.
- ^Note 12 : Eliéser answered the Big Phone and was automatically nominated.
- ^Note 13 : Fernanda pressed a button, which was stop a big chronometer in the garden and won immunity.
- ^Note 14 : Originally, Kamilla was named the Head of Household on day 52 but due to a production error, the HoH was voided and Nasser (the real winner) was named HoH instead on the night of day 53. Since Nasser won the PoI in the morning of day 53, the PoI was voied since Kamilla didn't have a chance to compete.
- ^Note 15 : André Martinelli answered the Big Phone and had to automatically nominate someone for eviction. He chose Marcello.
- ^Note 16 : Anamara and Kamilla received the most nominations with 3 each. Nasser, as Head of Household, had the casting vote and choose Kamilla to be the third nominee.
- ^Note 17 : Anamara and Fani received the most nominations with 2 each. As result, both joined Nasser as this week's nominees.
- ^Note 18 : On day 59, host Pedro Bial revealed to the housemates that starting this week, the winner of Power of Immunity competition, instead of give immunity to someone else, would win the immunity.
- ^Note 19 : Instead of the Big Phone, this week the housemate who opened the box would have to choose one housemate to be automatically nominated for eviction. Andressa opened the box and chose Kamilla to be the first nominee.
- ^Note 20 : Fernanda and Natália received the most nominations with 2 each. Nasser, as Head of Household, had the casting vote and choose Fernanda to be the second nominee.
- ^Note 21 : Andressa won the final Head of Household competition and nominated Natália for eviction. Since Fernanda and Nasser's votes would cancel each other out, only Natalia was eligible to nominate. She chose Fernanda to be the second nominee.

=== Have and Have-Nots ===
	Week 3	Week 4	Week 5	Week 6	Week 7	Week 8	Week 9	Week 10
Fernanda	Have-Not	Have	Have	Have	Have-Not	Have-Not	Have	Have
Nasser	Have	Have-Not	Have	Have-Not	Have	Have	Have-Not	Have-Not
Andressa	Have-Not	Have	Have-Not	Have-Not	Have	Have	Have-Not	Have
Natália	Have	Have-Not	Have-Not	Have-Not	Have	Have-Not	Have-Not	Have-Not
André M.	Have-Not	Have	Have	Have	Have-Not	Have	Have	Have
Fani	Have	Have-Not	Have-Not	Have-Not	Have-Not	Have	Have	Have-Not
Kamilla	Have-Not	Have	Have	Have	Have	Have	Have	
Anamara	Have	Have-Not	Have	Have	Have-Not	Have-Not		
Marcello	Have-Not	Have	Have-Not	Have-Not	Have	Have-Not		
Eliéser	Have	Have-Not	Have	Have	Have-Not			
Ivan	Have-Not	Have	Have-Not	Have-Not				
Marien	Have-Not	Have	Have-Not					
Yuri	Have	Have-Not						
Aslan	Have							

== Ratings and reception ==
=== Brazilian ratings ===
All numbers are in points and provided by IBOPE.

First air date	MON	TUE	WED	THU	FRI	SAT	SUN	Weekly average
01/08 to 01/13/2013	—	25	27	23	25	24	16	23
01/14 to 01/20/2013	26	25	26	26	25	20	16	23
01/21 to 01/27/2013	27	25	31	21	25	21	20	24
01/28 to 02/03/2013	27	25	27	23	26	23	15	24
02/04 to 02/10/2013	29	25	29	24	28	24	14	25
02/11 to 02/17/2013	27	24	30	25	29	25	15	25
02/18 to 02/24/2013	26	24	31	24	28	25	17	25
02/25 to 03/03/2013	28	24	31	23	27	27	17	26
03/04 to 03/10/2013	29	25	30	24	28	23	18	26
03/11 to 03/17/2013	28	24	32	24	28	25	15	26
03/18 to 03/24/2013	29	26	32	23	28	28	16	26
03/25 to 03/26/2013	30	29	—	—	—	—	—	30
01/08 to 03/26/2013	Season Average							25

- Each point represents 60.000 households in São Paulo.
