= Power Couple (Brazilian TV series) season 1 =

Power Couple
- Season 1
- Hosted by: Roberto Justus
- No. of contestants: 16 (8 couples)
- Winners: Laura & Jorge
- Runners-up: Simony & Patrick
- No. of episodes: 11

Release
- Original network: RecordTV
- Original release: April 12 – June 21, 2016

Season chronology
- Next → Season 2

The first season of Power Couple premiered on Tuesday, April 12, 2016 at 10:30 p.m. on RecordTV.

The show features eight celebrity couples living under one roof and facing extreme challenges that will test how well they really know each other. Each week, a couple will be eliminated until the last couple wins the grand prize.

Laura Keller & Jorge Sousa won the competition with 82.40% of the public vote over Simony & Patrick Souza and took home the R$697.000 prize they accumulated during the show. Simony & Patrick received a brand new car as the runners-up.

After beating Laura & Jorge in a face-off challenge during the live final, Simony & Patrick had the opportunity to reward an eliminated couple with R$20.000. They choose Gretchen & Carlos. Gretchen was also revealed to be Brazil's favorite contestant after winning the real time fan vote through Twitter, receiving another R$20.000, bringing her cash winnings to R$40.000.

== Cast ==
=== Couples ===
| Celebrity | Occupation | Partner | Occupation | Status |
|---|---|---|---|---|
| Popó | Professional boxer | Emilene Juarez | Physiotherapist | Eliminated 1st on April 19, 2016 |
| Mário Velloso | Singer | Pietra Bertolazzi | disseminator of controversial ideas (analogy to pedophilia) | Eliminated 2nd on May 3, 2016 |
| Túlio Maravilha | Former football player | Cristiane Maravilha | Publisher with common-sense self-help content | Eliminated 3rd on May 17, 2016 |
| Gretchen | Singer | Carlos Marques | Construction entrepreneur | Eliminated 4th on May 31, 2016 |
| Andréia Sorvetão | Former Paquita | Conrado | Singer | Eliminated 5th on June 7, 2016 |
| Gian | Singer | Tati Moreto | Blogger | Eliminated 6th on June 14, 2016 |
| Simony | Singer & TV host | Patrick Souza | Engineer | Runner-up on June 21, 2016 |
| Laura Keller | Actress | Jorge Sousa | Businessman | Winners on June 21, 2016 |

== Future appearances ==
In 2017, Conrado (from Andréia & Conrado) appeared in A Fazenda 9, he finished in 11th place.

In 2018, Popó (from Popó & Emilene) appeared in Dancing Brasil 3, he finished in 14th place.

In 2019, Túlio Maravilha (from Túlio & Cristiane) and Jorge Sousa (from Laura & Jorge) appeared in A Fazenda 11. Túlio finished in 14th place, and Jorge finished in 12th place.

In 2021, Laura Keller (from Laura & Jorge) appeared in Ilha Record 1, she finished in 3rd place in the competition.

In 2022, Gretchen (from Gretchen & Carlos) appeared as a Rose in The Masked Singer Brasil 2, she joined Group A and sang only one song before her unmasking at the first episode, placing last at 16th in the competition.

== The game ==
Key

| Men's challenge bet | Women's challenge bet | Passed the challenge (adds the betting sum) | Failed the challenge (deducts the betting sum) | Won couples' challenge (adds R$20.000) |

=== Challenges' results ===
| | | Week 1 | Week 2 | Week 3 | Week 4 | Week 5 | Week 6 | Week 7 |
|---|---|---|---|---|---|---|---|---|
| Sum of money | | R$40.000 | R$40.000 | R$40.000 | R$40.000 | R$40.000 | R$40.000 | Jackpot |
Bets
| Laura & Jorge | | R$39.000 | R$26.000 | R$21.000 | R$39.000 | R$30.000 | R$26.000 | R$697.000 |
| Laura & Jorge | | R$20.000 | R$66.000 | R$19.000 | R$57.000 | R$26.000 | R$66.000 | R$697.000 |
| Laura & Jorge | T | R$99.000 | R$152.000 | R$62.000 | R$136.000 | R$116.000 | R$132.000 | R$697.000 |
| Simony & Patrick | | R$27.000 | R$01.000 | R$24.000 | R$30.000 | R$24.000 | R$27.000 | R$371.000 |
| Simony & Patrick | | R$10.000 | R$41.000 | R$20.000 | R$10.000 | R$28.000 | R$67.000 | R$371.000 |
| Simony & Patrick | T | R$23.000 | R$82.000 | R$84.000 | R$30.000 | R$92.000 | R$50.000 | R$371.000 |
| Gian & Tati | | R$20.000 | R$02.000 | R$00.000 | R$15.000 | R$18.000 | R$25.000 | R$189.000 |
| Gian & Tati | | R$09.000 | R$14.000 | R$04.000 | R$00.000 | R$09.000 | R$33.000 | R$189.000 |
| Gian & Tati | T | R$29.000 | R$28.000 | R$44.000 | R$25.000 | R$31.000 | R$32.000 | R$189.000 |
| Andréia & Conrado | | R$11.000 | R$00.000 | R$03.000 | R$17.000 | R$28.000 | | R$262.000 |
| Andréia & Conrado | | R$00.000 | R$20.000 | R$10.000 | R$39.000 | R$12.000 | | R$262.000 |
| Andréia & Conrado | T | R$29.000 | R$60.000 | R$53.000 | R$96.000 | R$24.000 | | R$262.000 |
| Gretchen & Carlos | | R$00.000 | R$01.000 | R$22.000 | R$35.000 | | | R$185.000 |
| Gretchen & Carlos | | R$10.000 | R$04.000 | R$18.000 | R$01.000 | | | R$185.000 |
| Gretchen & Carlos | T | R$30.000 | R$37.000 | R$44.000 | R$74.000 | | | R$185.000 |
| Túlio & Cristiane | | R$00.000 | R$00.000 | R$04.000 | | | | R$93.000 |
| Túlio & Cristiane | | R$00.000 | R$30.000 | R$01.000 | | | | R$93.000 |
| Túlio & Cristiane | T | R$40.000 | R$10.000 | R$43.000 | | | | R$93.000 |
| Mário & Pietra | | R$18.000 | R$25.000 | | | | | R$28.000 |
| Mário & Pietra | | R$14.000 | R$15.000 | | | | | R$28.000 |
| Mário & Pietra | T | R$28.000 | R$00.000 | | | | | R$28.000 |
| Popó & Emilene | | R$23.000 | | | | | | R$09.000 |
| Popó & Emilene | | R$08.000 | | | | | | R$09.000 |
| Popó & Emilene | T | R$09.000 | | | | | | R$09.000 |
| Notes | | (none) | | | | | 1 | (none) |
| Least money (pre-challenge) | | Mário; Pietra | Mário; Pietra | Laura; Jorge | Simony; Patrick | Andreia; Conrado | Simony; Patrick | |
| Couples' challenge winners | | Mário; Pietra | Laura; Jorge | Laura; Jorge | Simony; Patrick | Laura; Jorge | Simony; Patrick | |
Nominated
| Couples' challenge losers | | Gian; Tati | Gian; Tati | Gian; Tati | Gretchen; Carlos | Gian; Tati | Gian; Tati | |
| Least money (post-challenge) | | Popó; Emilene | Mário; Pietra | Túlio; Cristiane | Gian; Tati | Andréia; Conrado | | |

==== Notes ====
- ^Note 1: The final Couples' challenge (which would award the winner R$50.000 instead of R$20.000) losing couple would be automatically eliminated. Gian & Tati quit the endurance challenge first and were eliminated. Laura & Jorge quit second, leaving Simony & Patrick as the winners.

=== Voting history ===
| | Week 1 | Week 2 | Week 3 | Week 4 | Week 5 | Week 6 | Week 7 |
| | Week 1 | Week 2 | Week 3 | Week 4 | Week 5 | Week 6 | Finale |
|---|---|---|---|---|---|---|---|
| Power Couple | Laura; Jorge | Laura; Jorge | Simony; Patrick | Laura; Jorge | Laura; Jorge | Laura; Jorge | (none) |
| Nominated | Gian; Tati | Gian; Tati | Gian; Tati | Gian; Tati | Andréia; Conrado | Gian; Tati | (none) |
| Nominated | Gian; Tati | Gian; Tati | Gian; Tati | Gian; Tati | Andréia; Conrado | Laura; Jorge | (none) |
| Nominated | Popó; Emilene | Mário; Pietra | Túlio; Cristiane | Gretchen; Carlos | Gian; Tati | Laura; Jorge | (none) |
| Nominated | Popó; Emilene | Mário; Pietra | Túlio; Cristiane | Gretchen; Carlos | Gian; Tati | Simony; Patrick | (none) |
| Laura & Jorge | Popó; Emilene | Mário; Pietra | Túlio; Cristiane | Gian; Tati | Gian; Tati | Not eligible | Winners (week 7) |
| Simony & Patrick | Gian; Tati | Gian; Tati | Gian; Tati | Gretchen; Carlos | Gian; Tati | Not eligible | Runner-up (week 7) |
| Gian & Tati | Nominated | Nominated | Nominated | Nominated | Nominated | Not eligible | Eliminated (Week 6) |
| Andréia & Conrado | Gian; Tati | Gian; Tati | Gian; Tati | Gian; Tati | Nominated | Eliminated (Week 5) | |
| Gretchen & Carlos | Popó; Emilene | Gian; Tati | Gian; Tati | Nominated | Eliminated (Week 4) | | |
| Túlio & Cristiane | Gian; Tati | Gian; Tati | Nominated | Eliminated (Week 3) | | | |
| Mário & Pietra | Popó; Emilene | Nominated | Eliminated (Week 2) | | | | |
| Popó & Emilene | Nominated | Eliminated (Week 1) | | | | | |
| Notes | 2 | (none) | | | | 1 | 3 |
| Eliminated | Popó; Emilene; 3 of 6 votes to save | Mário; Pietra; 1 of 5 votes to save | Túlio; Cristiane; 1 of 4 votes to save | Gretchen; Carlos; 1 of 3 votes to save | Andréia; Conrado; 0 of 2 votes to save | Gian; Tati; Lost couples' challenge | Simony; Patrick; 17.60% to win |
| Saved | Gian; Tati; 3 of 6 votes to save | Gian; Tati; 4 of 5 votes to save | Gian; Tati; 3 of 4 votes to save | Gian; Tati; 2 of 3 votes to save | Gian; Tati; 2 of 2 votes to save | Laura; Jorge; Finalist couples' challenge | Laura; Jorge; 82.40% to win |
| Saved | Gian; Tati; 3 of 6 votes to save | Gian; Tati; 4 of 5 votes to save | Gian; Tati; 3 of 4 votes to save | Gian; Tati; 2 of 3 votes to save | Gian; Tati; 2 of 2 votes to save | Simony; Patrick; Finalist couples' challenge | Laura; Jorge; 82.40% to win |

==== Notes ====
- ^Note 2: At the end of week 1's couples' save vote, Gian & Tati and Popó & Emilene were tied with 3 votes each. Per the rules, since Gian & Tati have the most money in their overall Bank account, they were saved from elimination, while Popó & Emilene ended up being eliminated.
- ^Note 3: For the final, the public votes for the couple they want to win Power Couple Brasil 1.

== Ratings and reception ==
=== Brazilian ratings ===
All numbers are in points and provided by Kantar Ibope Media.

| Episode | Week | Air date | Timeslot (BRT) | SP viewers (in points) | Rank (timeslot) | Source |
|---|---|---|---|---|---|---|
| 1 | 1 | April 12, 2016 | Tuesday; 10:30 p.m. | 8.9 | 2 | |
| 2 | 1 | April 19, 2016 | Tuesday; 10:30 p.m. | 7.9 | 2 | |
| 3 | 2 | April 26, 2016 | Tuesday; 10:30 p.m. | 8.1 | 3 | |
| 4 | 2 | May 3, 2016 | Tuesday; 10:30 p.m. | 8.6 | 2 | |
| 5 | 3 | May 10, 2016 | Tuesday; 10:30 p.m. | 9.9 | 2 | |
| 6 | 3 | May 17, 2016 | Tuesday; 10:30 p.m. | 8.8 | 2 | |
| 7 | 4 | May 24, 2016 | Tuesday; 10:30 p.m. | 10.4 | 2 | |
| 8 | 4 | May 31, 2016 | Tuesday; 10:30 p.m. | 10.4 | 2 | |
| 9 | 5 | June 7, 2016 | Tuesday; 10:30 p.m. | 10.3 | 2 | |
| 10 | 6 | June 14, 2016 | Tuesday; 10:30 p.m. | 10.0 | 2 | |
| 11 | 7 | June 21, 2016 | Tuesday; 10:30 p.m. | 11.1 | 2 | |

- In 2016, each point represents 69.417 households in São Paulo.
