= Babi Rossi =

Brazilian model and television presenter

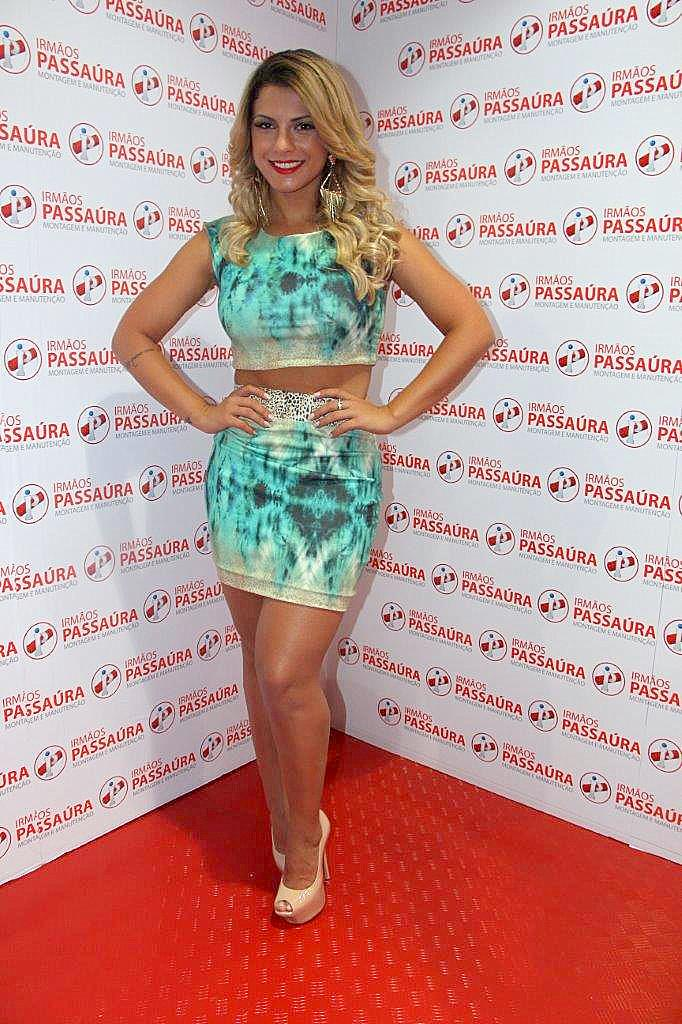
- Born: February 9, 1990 (age 35); São Paulo, São Paulo, Brazil
- Occupation(s): Model, presenter
- Years active: 2008–present

Babi Rossi (born Bárbara Cristina Rossi on February 9, 1990) is a Brazilian model and TV presenter, popularly known for her performance as a panicat for the live TV show Pânico na TV.

== Career ==
Starting her early career as a model, Rossi made her entry to the television screen as an assistant in stage programming for the popular shows Brothers e O Melhor do Brasil. In 2010, she had a breakthrough in her career when she made her way to the comedy program Pânico na TV as a panicat. Panicats are a group of models in tiny bikinis who dance onstage during the program and often become subjects for the show's pranks. Becoming a successful panicat by winning the hearts of the male audience, Rossi currently holds the record for the panicat having the longest term in the show. She had a massive career uplift from the show and starred in several advertising campaigns and essays. She also became the cover girl of many men's magazines, including Playboy.

== Controversy ==
Her career as a panicat was met with many controversies and the most prominent one was the head shaving episode. On April 22, 2012 she shaved her head live on television. The audience initially thought it was a fake, but realized that it was real by the end of the episode. Rossi was unaware of the head shaving and she was actually shocked by the crew's decision.

Television critics, bloggers and newspapers severely criticized the show, stating that their prank crossed the line. This holds the record for the most watched episode in the show's history, and had record audience participation. "Bald Babi" became the hot topic of discussion on social networking sites like Facebook and Twitter, and with that particular episode she earned international attention and immense fame. To everyone's surprise, Rossi later responded to the controversy rather mildly and said she enjoyed it.

However, in 2014 and in 2016 in two separate interviews on two separate programs, she divulged the truth about what really happened. She was not told that she was going to be shaved and she also did not want it to happen. She thought that because she got her head shaved that she was going to get either a bonus or a reward, like being upgraded from a panicat to the regular cast of the show. She thought that paying lip service about how she 'liked' the headshave and also refusing to file lawsuits against the producers would mean she would get a reward. She never received a reward. The only thing that happened to her benefit was she was the MC and host of the show for only the episode following the headshaving episode.

== Personal life ==
Babi Rossi was born in São Paulo, Brazil on February 9, 1990 to a working-class family. Her mother Margarete is a businesswoman.

She dated Olin Batista (son of Eike Batista) from December 2012 to November 2013.

As of 2018, she is now currently studying to become a veterinarian.

== Filmography ==
Television
Year	Title	Role	Television network
2008	O Melhor do Brasil	Herself (stage assistant)	Rede Record
2009	Brothers	Herself (stage assistant)	RedeTV!
2009–2012	Pânico na TV	Herself (stage assistant)	RedeTV!
2012–2013	Pânico na Band	Herself (stage assistant)	Band
2014	Muito Show	Herself (co-host)	RedeTV!
2014	A Fazenda 7	Herself (contestant)	Rede Record
2015	TV Fama	Herself (co-host)	RedeTV!
