= A Fazenda 16 =

A Fazenda
- Season 16
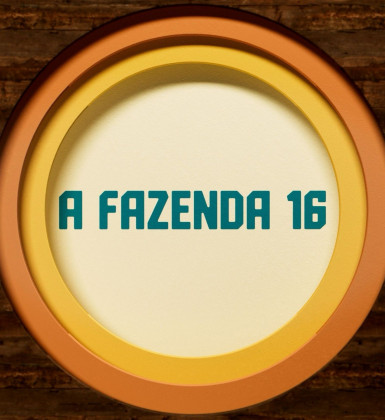
- Hosted by: Adriane Galisteu
- No. of days: 96
- No. of contestants: 24
- Winner: Sacha Bali
- Runner-up: Sidney Sampaio
- Companion show: A Fazenda Online
- No. of episodes: 95

Release
- Original network: Record
- Original release: September 16 – December 19, 2024

Season chronology
- ← Previous; Season 15 Next → Season 17

A Fazenda 16 was the sixteenth season of the Brazilian reality television series A Fazenda, which premiered Monday, September 16, 2024, at 10:30 / 9:30 p.m. (BRT / AMT) on Record.

Adriane Galisteu returned for her fourth season as the main host, with Lucas Selfie continuing as the online host and correspondent. Márcia Fu, a former A Fazenda 15 finalist, debuted as the host of a comedic segment aired during eviction nights.

Actor Sacha Bali won the competition with 50.93% of the public vote, defeating actor Sidney Sampaio (23.98%), model Yuri Bonotto (18.46%), and actor Gui Vieira (6.63%). Sacha received R$2 million as the grand prize. Sidney was awarded a Fiat Titanium pickup truck valued at R$230,000, while Yuri received R$50,000 for his third-place finish.

== Contestants ==
The first six contestants of A Fazenda 16 were officially revealed on September 15, 2024: Camila Moura, Gilsão de Oliveira, Flor Fernandez, Babi Muniz, Zé Love and Sidney Sampaio. The remaining contestants were introduced during the season's premiere on September 16, 2024.

| Contestant | Age | Background | Hometown | Entered | Exited | Status | Finish |
|---|---|---|---|---|---|---|---|
| Vivi Fernandez | 46 | Actress | Brasília | Day 5 | Day 12 | Eliminated 1st on September 26, 2024 | 24th |
| Larissa Tomásia | 28 | Digital influencer | Limoeiro | Day 1 | Day 19 | Eliminated 2nd on October 3, 2024 | 23rd |
| Raquel Brito | 23 | Digital influencer | Salvador | Day 1 | Day 22 | Ejected on October 7, 2024 | 22nd |
| Cauê Fantin | 26 | Actor | Itapecerica da Serra | Day 5 | Day 26 | Eliminated 3rd on October 10, 2024 | 21st |
| Sue Gervásio | 28 | Digital influencer | Rio de Janeiro | Day 1 | Day 33 | Eliminated 4th on October 17, 2024 | 20th |
| Julia Simoura | 20 | Actress | Belo Horizonte | Day 1 | Day 40 | Eliminated 5th on October 24, 2024 | 19th |
| Zaac | 31 | Singer | Diadema | Day 1 | Day 43 | Walked on October 27, 2024 | 18th |
| Fernanda Campos | 27 | Digital influencer | Alpinópolis | Day 1 | Day 43 | Walked on October 27, 2024 | 17th |
| Camila Moura | 30 | Teacher | Rio de Janeiro | Day 1 | Day 47 | Eliminated 6th on October 31, 2024 | 16th |
| Zé Love | 36 | Former footballer | Promissão | Day 1 | Day 54 | Eliminated 7th on November 7, 2024 | 15th |
| Gizelly Bicalho | 33 | Lawyer | Iúna | Day 5 | Day 61 | Eliminated 8th on November 14, 2024 | 14th |
| Babi Muniz | 34 | Actress | São Paulo | Day 1 | Day 68 | Eliminated 9th on November 21, 2024 | 13th |
| Fer Presto | 38 | Chef | Mogi das Cruzes | Day 1 | Day 75 | Eliminated 10th on November 28, 2024 | 12th |
| Flora Cruz | 21 | Digital influencer | Rio de Janeiro | Day 1 | Day 82 | Eliminated 11th on December 5, 2024 | 11th |
| Luana Targinno | 27 | Digital influencer | Recife | Day 1 | Day 89 | Eliminated 12th on December 12, 2024 | 10th |
| Flor Fernandez | 60 | TV host | São Caetano do Sul | Day 1 | Day 89 | Eliminated 13th on December 12, 2024 | 9th |
| Albert Bressan | 54 | Entrepreneur | Ribeirão Pires | Day 5 | Day 92 | Eliminated 14th on December 15, 2024 | 8th |
| Gilsão de Oliveira | 42 | Personal trainer | Rio de Janeiro | Day 1 | Day 93 | Eliminated 15th on December 16, 2024 | 7th |
| Nêssa Carvalho | 35 | Actress | Teófilo Otoni | Day 1 | Day 94 | Eliminated 16th on December 17, 2024 | 6th |
| Juninho Bill | 47 | Singer | Guarulhos | Day 1 | Day 94 | Eliminated 17th on December 17, 2024 | 5th |
| Gui Vieira | 21 | Actor | São Paulo | Day 1 | Day 96 | Fourth place on December 19, 2024 | 4th |
| Yuri Bonotto | 34 | Model | Porto Alegre | Day 1 | Day 96 | Third place on December 19, 2024 | 3rd |
| Sidney Sampaio | 44 | Actor | Lucélia | Day 1 | Day 96 | Runner-up on December 19, 2024 | 2nd |
| Sacha Bali | 43 | Actor | Rio de Janeiro | Day 1 | Day 96 | Winner on December 19, 2024 | 1st |

== The game ==
=== The Warehouse ===
The Warehouse featured eight candidates (four men and four women) competing for four official spots in the main cast. The public voted for their favorites, and the top four, regardless of gender, entered the show on September 19, 2024.

| Contestant | Age | Background | Hometown | Entered | Exited | Status | Finish |
|---|---|---|---|---|---|---|---|
| **Gabriela Rossi**; De Férias com o Ex Caribe 3 | 29 | Digital influencer | Porto Velho | Day 1 | Day 5 | Not Selected on September 19, 2024 | 8th |
| **Michael Calasans**; A Grande Conquista 2 | 32 | App driver | Santo André | Day 2 | Day 5 | Not Selected on September 19, 2024 | 7th |
| **Geovana Chagas**; Kwai | 20 | Actress | Mauá | Day 2 | Day 5 | Not Selected on September 19, 2024 | 6th |
| **D'Black**; Power Couple Brasil 3 | 39 | Singer | Rio de Janeiro | Day 2 | Day 5 | Not Selected on September 19, 2024 | 6th |
| **Cauê Fantin**; Kwai | 26 | Actor | Itapecerica da Serra | Day 2 | Day 5 | Selected on September 19, 2024 | 4th |
| **Albert Bressan**; Power Couple Brasil 6 | 54 | Entrepreneur | Ribeirão Pires | Day 2 | Day 5 | Selected on September 19, 2024 | 3rd |
| **Vivi Fernandez**; A Grande Conquista 2 | 46 | Actress | Brasília | Day 2 | Day 5 | Selected on September 19, 2024 | 2nd |
| **Gizelly Bicalho**; Big Brother Brasil 20 | 33 | Lawyer | Iúna | Day 2 | Day 5 | Selected on September 19, 2024 | 1st |

=== Fire challenge ===
Each week, contestants (determined by a random draw) compete in the Fire challenge to win the Lamp power. The Lamp power entitles the holder two flames (white and orange), which may unleash good or bad consequences on the nomination process, with the orange flame power defined by the public through the show's profile on Kwai among two options.

The winner chooses a flame for itself and delegates which contestant holds the other. The Flame holder's choice is marked in bold.

| Week | Players | | Winner | Sent to the Stall | Consequences |
|---|---|---|---|---|---|
| 1 | Sue | | Zé Love | Albert, Fernanda, Sacha, Sidney | Zé Love: The holder must replace the vetoed contestant from the Farmer's challenge (Flor) → **Sacha**.; Zaac: The holder must immunize three contestants from the Save Chain, except themselves → **Babi**, **Fernanda** and **Juninho**. |
| 1 | Flora | | Zé Love | Albert, Fernanda, Sacha, Sidney | Zé Love: The holder must replace the vetoed contestant from the Farmer's challenge (Flor) → **Sacha**.; Zaac: The holder must immunize three contestants from the Save Chain, except themselves → **Babi**, **Fernanda** and **Juninho**. |
| 1 | Gilsão | | Zé Love | Albert, Fernanda, Sacha, Sidney | Zé Love: The holder must replace the vetoed contestant from the Farmer's challenge (Flor) → **Sacha**.; Zaac: The holder must immunize three contestants from the Save Chain, except themselves → **Babi**, **Fernanda** and **Juninho**. |
| 1 | Zé Love | | Zé Love | Albert, Fernanda, Sacha, Sidney | Zé Love: The holder must replace the vetoed contestant from the Farmer's challenge (Flor) → **Sacha**.; Zaac: The holder must immunize three contestants from the Save Chain, except themselves → **Babi**, **Fernanda** and **Juninho**. |
| 2 | Babi | | Sacha | **Babi**, **Yuri**, Larissa, Zaac | Sacha: Undisclosed → **Power cancelled**.; Larissa: The holder must transfer all votes to another contestant, including their own if desired → **Power cancelled**. |
| 2 | Sacha | | Sacha | **Babi**, **Yuri**, Larissa, Zaac | Sacha: Undisclosed → **Power cancelled**.; Larissa: The holder must transfer all votes to another contestant, including their own if desired → **Power cancelled**. |
| 2 | Yuri | | Sacha | **Babi**, **Yuri**, Larissa, Zaac | Sacha: Undisclosed → **Power cancelled**.; Larissa: The holder must transfer all votes to another contestant, including their own if desired → **Power cancelled**. |
| 3 | Camila | | Camila | **~~Raquel~~**, **Zé Love**, Sue, Zaac | Sacha: The holder will have each vote received count as two.; Camila: The holder must choose between immunity from the Farmer's nomination or **immunity from the House vote**. |
| 3 | Raquel | | Camila | **~~Raquel~~**, **Zé Love**, Sue, Zaac | Sacha: The holder will have each vote received count as two.; Camila: The holder must choose between immunity from the Farmer's nomination or **immunity from the House vote**. |
| 3 | Zé Love | | Camila | **~~Raquel~~**, **Zé Love**, Sue, Zaac | Sacha: The holder will have each vote received count as two.; Camila: The holder must choose between immunity from the Farmer's nomination or **immunity from the House vote**. |
| 4 | Flora | | Sidney | **Flora**, **Julia**, **Sacha**, Nêssa | Sidney: The holder wins a R$10,000 prize if they choose to leave the House without hot water for 48 hours → **Accepted**.; Albert: The holder must cancel all votes received by a contestant from the House → **Fernanda**. |
| 4 | Julia | | Sidney | **Flora**, **Julia**, **Sacha**, Nêssa | Sidney: The holder wins a R$10,000 prize if they choose to leave the House without hot water for 48 hours → **Accepted**.; Albert: The holder must cancel all votes received by a contestant from the House → **Fernanda**. |
| 4 | Sacha | | Sidney | **Flora**, **Julia**, **Sacha**, Nêssa | Sidney: The holder wins a R$10,000 prize if they choose to leave the House without hot water for 48 hours → **Accepted**.; Albert: The holder must cancel all votes received by a contestant from the House → **Fernanda**. |
| 4 | Sidney | | Sidney | **Flora**, **Julia**, **Sacha**, Nêssa | Sidney: The holder wins a R$10,000 prize if they choose to leave the House without hot water for 48 hours → **Accepted**.; Albert: The holder must cancel all votes received by a contestant from the House → **Fernanda**. |
| 5 | Fernanda | | Gui | **Fernanda**, **Gizelly**, **Juninho**, Sacha | Gui: The holder is immune and must immunize one more contestant → **Sacha**.; Luana: The holder must choose one contestant from the Stall (**Fernanda**) and one from the House (**Fer**); the second nominee (Julia) must choose one as the third nominee → Fer. |
| 5 | Gizelly | | Gui | **Fernanda**, **Gizelly**, **Juninho**, Sacha | Gui: The holder is immune and must immunize one more contestant → **Sacha**.; Luana: The holder must choose one contestant from the Stall (**Fernanda**) and one from the House (**Fer**); the second nominee (Julia) must choose one as the third nominee → Fer. |
| 5 | Gui | | Gui | **Fernanda**, **Gizelly**, **Juninho**, Sacha | Gui: The holder is immune and must immunize one more contestant → **Sacha**.; Luana: The holder must choose one contestant from the Stall (**Fernanda**) and one from the House (**Fer**); the second nominee (Julia) must choose one as the third nominee → Fer. |
| 5 | Juninho | | Gui | **Fernanda**, **Gizelly**, **Juninho**, Sacha | Gui: The holder is immune and must immunize one more contestant → **Sacha**.; Luana: The holder must choose one contestant from the Stall (**Fernanda**) and one from the House (**Fer**); the second nominee (Julia) must choose one as the third nominee → Fer. |
| 6 | Albert | Luana | Zé Love | **Albert**, **Camila**, **Fer**, **Luana** | Zé Love: The holder wins a R$5,000 prize and must choose another contestant to win R$5,000 as well → **Gilsão**.; Sidney: The holder must choose three contestants (**Gui**, **Luana** and **Nêssa**), and the Farmer (Gilsão) decides who the fourth nominee is → Luana. |
| 6 | Camila | Sidney | Zé Love | **Albert**, **Camila**, **Fer**, **Luana** | Zé Love: The holder wins a R$5,000 prize and must choose another contestant to win R$5,000 as well → **Gilsão**.; Sidney: The holder must choose three contestants (**Gui**, **Luana** and **Nêssa**), and the Farmer (Gilsão) decides who the fourth nominee is → Luana. |
| 6 | Fer | Zé Love | Zé Love | **Albert**, **Camila**, **Fer**, **Luana** | Zé Love: The holder wins a R$5,000 prize and must choose another contestant to win R$5,000 as well → **Gilsão**.; Sidney: The holder must choose three contestants (**Gui**, **Luana** and **Nêssa**), and the Farmer (Gilsão) decides who the fourth nominee is → Luana. |
| 7 | Gilsão | | Juninho | ~~**Gilsão**, **Gizelly**, Nêssa, Yuri~~; Albert, Flor, Gui, Zé Love | Sidney: The holder must swap all Stall residents (Gilsão, Gizelly, Nêssa and Yuri) with House contestants → **Albert**, **Flor**, **Gui** and **Zé Love**.; Juninho: The holder must choose two contestants from the Stall to be available for the face-to-face vote → **Flor** and **Gui**. |
| 7 | Gizelly | | Juninho | ~~**Gilsão**, **Gizelly**, Nêssa, Yuri~~; Albert, Flor, Gui, Zé Love | Sidney: The holder must swap all Stall residents (Gilsão, Gizelly, Nêssa and Yuri) with House contestants → **Albert**, **Flor**, **Gui** and **Zé Love**.; Juninho: The holder must choose two contestants from the Stall to be available for the face-to-face vote → **Flor** and **Gui**. |
| 7 | Juninho | | Juninho | ~~**Gilsão**, **Gizelly**, Nêssa, Yuri~~; Albert, Flor, Gui, Zé Love | Sidney: The holder must swap all Stall residents (Gilsão, Gizelly, Nêssa and Yuri) with House contestants → **Albert**, **Flor**, **Gui** and **Zé Love**.; Juninho: The holder must choose two contestants from the Stall to be available for the face-to-face vote → **Flor** and **Gui**. |
| 8 | Albert | | Albert | **Luana**, **Yuri**, Juninho, Nêssa | Albert: The holder must choose between **immunity in this vote** or a R$10,000 prize.; Juninho: The holder must choose three from the House; only they can be voted as the second nominee → **Babi**, **Flora** and **Sidney**. |
| 8 | Luana | | Albert | **Luana**, **Yuri**, Juninho, Nêssa | Albert: The holder must choose between **immunity in this vote** or a R$10,000 prize.; Juninho: The holder must choose three from the House; only they can be voted as the second nominee → **Babi**, **Flora** and **Sidney**. |
| 8 | Yuri | | Albert | **Luana**, **Yuri**, Juninho, Nêssa | Albert: The holder must choose between **immunity in this vote** or a R$10,000 prize.; Juninho: The holder must choose three from the House; only they can be voted as the second nominee → **Babi**, **Flora** and **Sidney**. |
| 9 | Babi | Gui | Gui | **Flor**, **Flora**, **Juninho**, **Sidney** | Gui: The holder must veto a contestant from the Farmer's challenge → **Albert**.; Sacha: The holder must choose two contestants from the House who will also be eligible to be pulled from the Stall as the third nominee → **Albert** and **Gilsão**. |
| 9 | Flor | Juninho | Gui | **Flor**, **Flora**, **Juninho**, **Sidney** | Gui: The holder must veto a contestant from the Farmer's challenge → **Albert**.; Sacha: The holder must choose two contestants from the House who will also be eligible to be pulled from the Stall as the third nominee → **Albert** and **Gilsão**. |
| 9 | Flora | Sacha | Gui | **Flor**, **Flora**, **Juninho**, **Sidney** | Gui: The holder must veto a contestant from the Farmer's challenge → **Albert**.; Sacha: The holder must choose two contestants from the House who will also be eligible to be pulled from the Stall as the third nominee → **Albert** and **Gilsão**. |
| 9 | Gilsão | Sidney | Gui | **Flor**, **Flora**, **Juninho**, **Sidney** | Gui: The holder must veto a contestant from the Farmer's challenge → **Albert**.; Sacha: The holder must choose two contestants from the House who will also be eligible to be pulled from the Stall as the third nominee → **Albert** and **Gilsão**. |
| 10 | Albert | | Albert | **Fer**, **Nêssa**, Sacha, Yuri | Albert: The holder receives a R$11,000 prize if not nominated; otherwise, each other contestant gets R$11,000.; Flor: The holder must choose one immunity: from the Farmer's nomination, the **face-to-face House vote**, or the Save chain twist. |
| 10 | Fer | | Albert | **Fer**, **Nêssa**, Sacha, Yuri | Albert: The holder receives a R$11,000 prize if not nominated; otherwise, each other contestant gets R$11,000.; Flor: The holder must choose one immunity: from the Farmer's nomination, the **face-to-face House vote**, or the Save chain twist. |
| 10 | Nêssa | | Albert | **Fer**, **Nêssa**, Sacha, Yuri | Albert: The holder receives a R$11,000 prize if not nominated; otherwise, each other contestant gets R$11,000.; Flor: The holder must choose one immunity: from the Farmer's nomination, the **face-to-face House vote**, or the Save chain twist. |
| 11 | Gilsão | | Luana | **Gilsão**, **Sidney**, Albert, Gui | Sacha: The holder must choose two contestants (**Albert** and **Gilsão**), and a new vote will decide which of the two will become the fourth nominee (Gilsão).; Luana: The holder's vote (**Flora Cruz**) will count as 4. |
| 11 | Luana | | Luana | **Gilsão**, **Sidney**, Albert, Gui | Sacha: The holder must choose two contestants (**Albert** and **Gilsão**), and a new vote will decide which of the two will become the fourth nominee (Gilsão).; Luana: The holder's vote (**Flora Cruz**) will count as 4. |
| 11 | Sidney | | Luana | **Gilsão**, **Sidney**, Albert, Gui | Sacha: The holder must choose two contestants (**Albert** and **Gilsão**), and a new vote will decide which of the two will become the fourth nominee (Gilsão).; Luana: The holder's vote (**Flora Cruz**) will count as 4. |
| 12 | Top 10 contestants (except Farmer Gilsão) | | Nêssa | **Flor**, **Gui**, **Luana**, **Sacha** | Sidney: The holder must nominate a fifth nominee (**Gui Vieira**), who will veto two contestants from the Farmer's Challenge (Flor and Sacha).; Nêssa: The holder must choose between **immunity in this vote** or a R$20,000 prize. |

=== Delegations ===
| | Week 1 | Week 2 | Week 3 | Week 4 | Week 5 | Week 6 | Week 7 | Week 8 | Week 9 | Week 10 | Week 11 | Week 12 | Week 13 |
|---|---|---|---|---|---|---|---|---|---|---|---|---|---|
| Farmer of the week | **Julia** | **Flor** | **Julia** | **Zé Love** | **Yuri** | **Gilsão** | **Luana** | **Sacha** | **Luana** | **Gui** | **Yuri** | **Gilsão** | **Yuri** |
Obligations
| Cows & Bull | Gilsão; Zé Love | Sacha; Sue | Fernanda; Fer | Gilsão; Sidney | Gilsão; ~~Sue~~; Albert | ~~Zaac~~; Flora; Zé Love | Gilsão; Sidney | Fer; ~~Sidney~~; Nêssa | Gui; Yuri | Albert; Juninho | Gilsão; Sidney | Sacha; Yuri | Albert; Gilsão |
| Horse | Flor | Luana | Zaac | Flor | Sacha | Flor | Gui | Luana | Sacha | Yuri | Flor | Sidney | Gui |
| Mini goats | Yuri | Larissa | Camila | Fer | Julia | ~~Fernanda~~; Camila | Sacha | Gui | Flor | Luana | Flora | ~~Flora~~; Juninho | Sacha |
| Sheep | Babi | ~~Gui~~; Juninho | Sidney | Babi | Luana | ~~Sidney~~; Fer | Yuri | Flor | Flora | Sacha | Albert | Albert | Flor |
| Pigs | Nêssa | Cauê | Gilsão | Zaac | Flora | Babi | Albert | Juninho | Gilsão | Flor | Sacha | Luana | Juninho |
| Garden & Plants | Camila | Gizelly | Albert | Juninho | Camila | Nêssa | Fer | Albert | Nêssa | Sidney | Gui | Gui | Luana |
| Birds | Larissa | ~~Vivi~~; Raquel | Babi | Albert | Gui | Juninho | Flor | Gilsão | Fer | Nêssa | Luana | Flor | Sidney |
| Trash | Zaac | Julia | Zé Love | Gui | Flor | Gizelly | Zé Love | Gizelly | Babi | Fer | ~~Fer~~; Nêssa | Juninho | Albert |
| Camera operator | Raquel | Yuri | Flor | Fernanda | Gizelly | Albert | Flora | Yuri | Juninho | Flora | Juninho | Nêssa | Nêssa |
Farm's rach
| Farmer's guests | Luana; Raquel; Sue | Fernanda; Fer; Zé Love | Camila; Flora; Gizelly | Babi; Sidney; Zaac | Flora; Gui; Sacha | Albert; Juninho; Nêssa | Gui; Sacha; Yuri | Gui; Luana; Yuri | Guia; Sacha; Yuri | Luana; Sacha; Yuri | Gui; Luana; Sacha | Juninho; Nêssa; Sidney | Gui; Juninho; Sacha |

=== Voting history ===
| | Week 1 | | Week 2 | Week 3 | Week 4 | Week 5 | Week 6 | Week 7 | Week 8 | Week 9 | Week 10 | Week 11 | Week 12 | Week 13 | | | |
| | Day 2 | Day 10 | Week 2 | Week 3 | Week 4 | Week 5 | Week 6 | Week 7 | Week 8 | Week 9 | Week 10 | Week 11 | Week 12 | Day 91 | | Day 93 | Finale |
|---|---|---|---|---|---|---|---|---|---|---|---|---|---|---|---|---|---|
| Farmer of the week | (none) | Julia | Flor | Julia | Zé Love | Yuri | Gilsão | Luana | Sacha | Luana | Gui | Yuri | Gilsão | Yuri | | | (none) |
| Nomination (Farmer) | (none) | Flor | Julia | Zé Love | Yuri | Gilsão | Yuri | Zé Love | Gizelly | Babi | Juninho | Sidney | Sacha | (none) | | | (none) |
| Nomination (House) | (none) | Zé Love | Juninho | Sacha | Sue | Julia | Sacha | Sacha | Flora | Sacha | Luana | Flora | Yuri | (none) | | | (none) |
| Nomination (Stall) | (none) | Sacha | Larissa | Zaac | Nêssa | (none) | Camila | Flor | Nêssa | (none) | Fer | Gui | Flor | (none) | | | (none) |
| Nomination (Save Chain) | (none) | Vivi | Fer | Cauê | Sacha | Luana | (none) | Gui | Luana | Gui | Yuri | (none) | Luana | (none) | | | (none) |
| Nomination (Twist) | (none) | (none) | | | | Fer | Luana | (none) | | Albert | (none) | Gilsão | Gui | Albert; Sacha; Sidney; Yuri | Gilsão; Gui; Juninho; Nêssa | All contestants | (none) |
| Sacha | Not eligible | Zé Love | Juninho | Gizelly | Sue | Sidney | Zé Love | Fer | Farmer of the week | Gilsão | Albert | Flora | Albert | Nominee | Not eligible | Nominee | **Winner** (Day 96) |
| Sacha | Not eligible | Zé Love | Juninho | Gizelly | Sue | Sidney | Zé Love | Fer | Farmer of the week | Gilsão | Albert | Gilsão | Albert | Nominee | Not eligible | Nominee | **Winner** (Day 96) |
| Sidney | Not eligible | Larissa | Cauê | Sacha (x2) | Sue | Julia | Sacha | Sacha | Flora | Sacha | Luana | Sacha | Yuri | Nominee | Not eligible | Nominee | **Runner-up** (Day 96) |
| Sidney | Not eligible | Larissa | Cauê | Sacha (x2) | Sue | Julia | Sacha | Sacha | Flora | Sacha | Luana | Albert | Yuri | Nominee | Not eligible | Nominee | **Runner-up** (Day 96) |
| Yuri | Not eligible | Zé Love | Juninho | Fernanda | Babi | Farmer of the week | Zé Love | Babi | Babi | Gilsão | Albert | Farmer | Albert | Nominee | Not eligible | Nominee | **Third place** (Day 96) |
| Yuri | Not eligible | Zé Love | Juninho | Fernanda | Babi | Farmer of the week | Zé Love | Babi | Babi | Gilsão | Albert | Gilsão | Albert | Nominee | Not eligible | Nominee | **Third place** (Day 96) |
| Gui | Not eligible | Zé Love | Juninho | Fernanda | Fernanda | Zaac | Zé Love | Babi | Flora | Gilsão | Farmer of the week | Flor | Albert | Not eligible | Nominee | Nominee | **Fourth place** (Day 96) |
| Gui | Not eligible | Zé Love | Juninho | Fernanda | Fernanda | Zaac | Zé Love | Babi | Flora | Gilsão | Farmer of the week | Gilsão | Albert | Not eligible | Nominee | Nominee | **Fourth place** (Day 96) |
| Juninho | Not eligible | Gui | Cauê | Sacha (x2) | Sue | Julia | Gui | Gui | Flora | Sacha | Luana | Flor | Yuri | Not eligible | Nominee | Nominee | Evicted (Day 94) |
| Juninho | Not eligible | Gui | Cauê | Sacha (x2) | Sue | Julia | Gui | Gui | Flora | Sacha | Luana | Albert | Yuri | Not eligible | Nominee | Nominee | Evicted (Day 94) |
| Nêssa | Not eligible | Gilsão | Gilsão | Sacha (x2) | Sue | Julia | Sacha | Yuri | Flora | Sacha | Flora | Flora | Yuri | Not eligible | Nominee | Nominee | Evicted (Day 94) |
| Nêssa | Not eligible | Gilsão | Gilsão | Sacha (x2) | Sue | Julia | Sacha | Yuri | Flora | Sacha | Flora | Albert | Yuri | Not eligible | Nominee | Nominee | Evicted (Day 94) |
| Gilsão | Not eligible | Yuri | Cauê | Sacha (x2) | Sue | Julia | Farmer of the week | Gui | Flora | Sacha | Luana | Flor | Farmer of the week | Not eligible | Nominee | Evicted (Day 93) | |
| Gilsão | Not eligible | Yuri | Cauê | Sacha (x2) | Sue | Julia | Farmer of the week | Gui | Flora | Sacha | Luana | Nominee | Farmer of the week | Not eligible | Nominee | Evicted (Day 93) | |
| Albert | Not eligible | Gui | Cauê | Sacha (x2) | Sue | Julia | Sacha | Yuri | Flora | Yuri | Luana | Nêssa | Yuri | Nominee | Evicted (Day 92) | | |
| Albert | Not eligible | Gui | Cauê | Sacha (x2) | Sue | Julia | Sacha | Yuri | Flora | Yuri | Luana | Nominee | Yuri | Nominee | Evicted (Day 92) | | |
| Flor | Not eligible | Gui | Farmer of the week | Sacha (x2) | Sue | Julia | Sacha | Sacha | Flora | Gilsão | Gilsão | Flora | Yuri | Evicted (Day 89) | | | |
| Flor | Not eligible | Gui | Farmer of the week | Sacha (x2) | Sue | Julia | Sacha | Sacha | Flora | Gilsão | Gilsão | Gilsão | Yuri | Evicted (Day 89) | | | |
| Luana | Not eligible | Zé Love | Juninho | Sacha (x2) | Flor | Fer | Zé Love | Farmer of the week | Babi | Farmer of the week | Gilsão | Flora (x4) | Albert | Evicted (Day 89) | | | |
| Luana | Not eligible | Zé Love | Juninho | Sacha (x2) | Flor | Fer | Zé Love | Farmer of the week | Babi | Farmer of the week | Gilsão | Gilsão | Albert | Evicted (Day 89) | | | |
| Flora | Not eligible | Zé Love | Juninho | Sacha (x2) | Flor | Nêssa | Gui | Sacha | Babi | Sacha | Luana | Flor | Evicted (Day 82) | | | | |
| Flora | Not eligible | Zé Love | Juninho | Sacha (x2) | Flor | Nêssa | Gui | Sacha | Babi | Sacha | Luana | Albert | Evicted (Day 82) | | | | |
| Fer | Not eligible | Vivi | Cauê | Sacha (x2) | Sue | Julia | Sacha | Gui | Flora | Sacha | Luana | Evicted (Day 75) | | | | | |
| Babi | Not eligible | Gui | Cauê | Sacha (x2) | Sue | Julia | Sacha | Sacha | Flora | Sacha | Evicted (Day 68) | | | | | | |
| Gizelly | Warehouse | Zé Love | Juninho | Sacha (x2) | Juninho | Fer | Sacha | Sacha | Sidney | Evicted (Day 61) | | | | | | | |
| Zé Love | Not eligible | Sue | Cauê | Sacha (x2) | Farmer of the week | Julia | Sacha | Sacha | Evicted (Day 54) | | | | | | | | |
| Camila | Not eligible | Zé Love | Juninho | Sacha (x2) | ~~Fernanda~~ | Nêssa | Sacha | Evicted (Day 47) | | | | | | | | | |
| Fernanda | Not eligible | Gui | Cauê | Sacha (x2) | Sue | Julia | Walked (Day 43) | | | | | | | | | | |
| Zaac | Not eligible | Sue | Cauê | Sacha (x2) | Sue | Julia | Walked (Day 43) | | | | | | | | | | |
| Julia | Not eligible | Farmer of the week | Juninho | Farmer of the week | ~~Fernanda~~ | Nêssa | Evicted (Day 40) | | | | | | | | | | |
| Sue | Not eligible | Zé Love | Juninho | Sacha (x2) | Albert | Evicted (Day 33) | | | | | | | | | | | |
| Cauê | Warehouse | Zé Love | Juninho | Fernanda | Evicted (Day 26) | | | | | | | | | | | | |
| Raquel | Not eligible | Zé Love | Juninho | Ejected (Day 22) | | | | | | | | | | | | | |
| Larissa | Not eligible | Zé Love | Sidney | Evicted (Day 19) | | | | | | | | | | | | | |
| Vivi | Warehouse | Zé Love | Evicted (Day 12) | | | | | | | | | | | | | | |
| D'Black | Warehouse | Evicted (Day 5) | | | | | | | | | | | | | | | |
| Geovana | Warehouse | Evicted (Day 5) | | | | | | | | | | | | | | | |
| Michael | Warehouse | Evicted (Day 5) | | | | | | | | | | | | | | | |
| Gabriela | Warehouse | Evicted (Day 5) | | | | | | | | | | | | | | | |
| Notes | 1 | 1, 2 | 3 | 4, 5 | 6 | 7 | 8, 9 | 10 | 11 | 12 | 13 | 14 | 15 | 16 | | 17 | 18 |
| Ejected | (none) | | | **Raquel** | (none) | | | | | | | | | | | | |
| Walked | (none) | | | | | | **Fernanda** | (none) | | | | | | | | | |
| Walked | (none) | | | | | | **Zaac** | (none) | | | | | | | | | |
| Up for nomination | (none) | Flor; Sacha; Vivi; Zé Love | Fer; Julia; Juninho; Larissa | Cauê; Sacha; Zaac; Zé Love | Nêssa; Sacha; Sue; Yuri | Fer; Gilsão; Julia; Luana | Camila; Luana; Sacha; Yuri | Flor; Gui; Sacha; Zé Love | Flora; Gizelly; Luana; Nêssa | Albert; Babi; Gui; Sacha | Fer; Juninho; Luana; Yuri | Flora; Gilsão; Gui; Sidney | Flor; Gui; Luana; Sacha; Yuri | (none) | | | |
| Farmer winner | (none) | Flor | Julia | Zé Love | Yuri | Gilsão | Luana | Sacha | Luana | Gui | Yuri | Gilsão | Yuri | (none) | | | |
| Nominated for eviction | Albert; Cauê; D'Black; Gabriela; Geovana; Gizelly; Michael; Vivi | Sacha; Vivi; Zé Love | Fer; Juninho; Larissa | Cauê; Sacha; Zaac | Nêssa; Sacha; Sue | Fer; Julia; Luana | Camila; Sacha; Yuri | Flor; Gui; Zé Love | Flora; Gizelly; Nêssa | Albert; Babi; Sacha | Fer; Juninho; Luana | Flora; Gui; Sidney | Flor; Gui; Luana; Sacha | Albert; Sacha; Sidney; Yuri | Gilsão; Gui; Juninho; Nêssa | Gui; Juninho; Nêssa; Sacha; Sidney; Yuri | Gui; Sacha; Sidney; Yuri |
| Evicted | **Gabriela**; 8.42% to enter | **Vivi**; 16.52% to save | **Larissa**; 26.40% to save | **Cauê**; 6.79% to save | **Sue**; 8.15% to save | **Julia**; 22.15% to save | **Camila**; 25.49% to save | **Zé Love**; 30.02% to save | **Gizelly**; 20.02% to save | **Babi**; 13.74% to save | **Fer**; 7.01% to save | **Flora**; 21.87% to save | **Luana**; 8.16% to save | **Albert**; 0.85% to save | **Gilsão**; 8.89% to save | **Nêssa**; 1.07% to save | **Gui**; 6.63% to win |
| Evicted | **Michael**; 9.34% to enter | **Vivi**; 16.52% to save | **Larissa**; 26.40% to save | **Cauê**; 6.79% to save | **Sue**; 8.15% to save | **Julia**; 22.15% to save | **Camila**; 25.49% to save | **Zé Love**; 30.02% to save | **Gizelly**; 20.02% to save | **Babi**; 13.74% to save | **Fer**; 7.01% to save | **Flora**; 21.87% to save | **Luana**; 8.16% to save | **Albert**; 0.85% to save | **Gilsão**; 8.89% to save | **Nêssa**; 1.07% to save | **Gui**; 6.63% to win |
| Evicted | **Michael**; 9.34% to enter | **Vivi**; 16.52% to save | **Larissa**; 26.40% to save | **Cauê**; 6.79% to save | **Sue**; 8.15% to save | **Julia**; 22.15% to save | **Camila**; 25.49% to save | **Zé Love**; 30.02% to save | **Gizelly**; 20.02% to save | **Babi**; 13.74% to save | **Fer**; 7.01% to save | **Flora**; 21.87% to save | **Luana**; 8.16% to save | **Albert**; 0.85% to save | **Gilsão**; 8.89% to save | **Nêssa**; 1.07% to save | **Yuri**; 18.46% to win |
| Evicted | **Geovana**; 10.11% to enter | **Vivi**; 16.52% to save | **Larissa**; 26.40% to save | **Cauê**; 6.79% to save | **Sue**; 8.15% to save | **Julia**; 22.15% to save | **Camila**; 25.49% to save | **Zé Love**; 30.02% to save | **Gizelly**; 20.02% to save | **Babi**; 13.74% to save | **Fer**; 7.01% to save | **Flora**; 21.87% to save | **Flor**; 15.81% to save | **Albert**; 0.85% to save | **Gilsão**; 8.89% to save | **Juninho**; 3.94% to save | **Yuri**; 18.46% to win |
| Evicted | **Geovana**; 10.11% to enter | **Vivi**; 16.52% to save | **Larissa**; 26.40% to save | **Cauê**; 6.79% to save | **Sue**; 8.15% to save | **Julia**; 22.15% to save | **Camila**; 25.49% to save | **Zé Love**; 30.02% to save | **Gizelly**; 20.02% to save | **Babi**; 13.74% to save | **Fer**; 7.01% to save | **Flora**; 21.87% to save | **Flor**; 15.81% to save | **Albert**; 0.85% to save | **Gilsão**; 8.89% to save | **Juninho**; 3.94% to save | **Sidney**; 23.98% to win |
| Evicted | **D'Black**; 10.96% to enter | **Vivi**; 16.52% to save | **Larissa**; 26.40% to save | **Cauê**; 6.79% to save | **Sue**; 8.15% to save | **Julia**; 22.15% to save | **Camila**; 25.49% to save | **Zé Love**; 30.02% to save | **Gizelly**; 20.02% to save | **Babi**; 13.74% to save | **Fer**; 7.01% to save | **Flora**; 21.87% to save | **Flor**; 15.81% to save | **Albert**; 0.85% to save | **Gilsão**; 8.89% to save | **Juninho**; 3.94% to save | **Sidney**; 23.98% to win |
| Survived | **Cauê**; 12.16% to enter | **Sacha**; 31.57% to save | **Fer**; 34.79% to save | **Zaac**; 34.94% to save | **Nêssa**; 43.27% to save | **Luana**; 36.32% to save | **Sacha**; 30.23% to save | **Flor**; 32.45% to save | **Flora**; 39.28% to save | **Albert**; 18.82% to save | **Juninho**; 21.93% to save | **Sidney**; 26.17% to save | **Gui**; 34.83% to save | **Sidney**; 18.99% to save | **Nêssa**; 10.61% to save | **Gui**; 13.94% to save | **Sacha**; 50.93% to win |
| Survived | **Albert**; 12.99% to enter | **Sacha**; 31.57% to save | **Fer**; 34.79% to save | **Zaac**; 34.94% to save | **Nêssa**; 43.27% to save | **Luana**; 36.32% to save | **Sacha**; 30.23% to save | **Flor**; 32.45% to save | **Flora**; 39.28% to save | **Albert**; 18.82% to save | **Juninho**; 21.93% to save | **Sidney**; 26.17% to save | **Gui**; 34.83% to save | **Sidney**; 18.99% to save | **Nêssa**; 10.61% to save | **Yuri**; 18.58% to save | **Sacha**; 50.93% to win |
| Survived | **Albert**; 12.99% to enter | **Sacha**; 31.57% to save | **Fer**; 34.79% to save | **Zaac**; 34.94% to save | **Nêssa**; 43.27% to save | **Luana**; 36.32% to save | **Sacha**; 30.23% to save | **Flor**; 32.45% to save | **Flora**; 39.28% to save | **Albert**; 18.82% to save | **Juninho**; 21.93% to save | **Sidney**; 26.17% to save | **Gui**; 34.83% to save | **Yuri**; 31.87% to save | **Juninho**; 14.75% to save | **Yuri**; 18.58% to save | **Sacha**; 50.93% to win |
| Survived | **Vivi**; 15.28% to enter | **Zé Love**; 51.91% to save | **Juninho**; 38.81% to save | **Sacha**; 58.27% to save | **Sacha**; 48.58% to save | **Fer**; 41.53% to save | **Yuri**; 44.28% to save | **Gui**; 37.53% to save | **Nêssa**; 40.70% to save | **Sacha**; 67.44% to save | **Luana**; 71.06% to save | **Gui**; 51.96% to save | **Sacha**; 41.20% to save | **Yuri**; 31.87% to save | **Juninho**; 14.75% to save | **Sidney**; 20.04% to save | **Sacha**; 50.93% to win |
| Survived | **Vivi**; 15.28% to enter | **Zé Love**; 51.91% to save | **Juninho**; 38.81% to save | **Sacha**; 58.27% to save | **Sacha**; 48.58% to save | **Fer**; 41.53% to save | **Yuri**; 44.28% to save | **Gui**; 37.53% to save | **Nêssa**; 40.70% to save | **Sacha**; 67.44% to save | **Luana**; 71.06% to save | **Gui**; 51.96% to save | **Sacha**; 41.20% to save | **Sacha**; 48.30% to save | **Gui**; 65.75% to save | **Sidney**; 20.04% to save | **Sacha**; 50.93% to win |
| Survived | **Gizelly**; 20.74% to enter | **Zé Love**; 51.91% to save | **Juninho**; 38.81% to save | **Sacha**; 58.27% to save | **Sacha**; 48.58% to save | **Fer**; 41.53% to save | **Yuri**; 44.28% to save | **Gui**; 37.53% to save | **Nêssa**; 40.70% to save | **Sacha**; 67.44% to save | **Luana**; 71.06% to save | **Gui**; 51.96% to save | **Sacha**; 41.20% to save | **Sacha**; 48.30% to save | **Gui**; 65.75% to save | **Sacha**; 42.43% to save | **Sacha**; 50.93% to win |

==== Notes ====
- **^Note 1**: Albert, Cauê, D'Black, Gabriela, Geovana, Gizelly, Michael, and Vivi entered the Warehouse, competing for the public's vote to join the House. The public chose four contestants to officially enter the game: Albert, Cauê, Gizelly, and Vivi. In a surprise challenge, Warehouse contestants faced Stall members in paired ball-throwing duels: Albert lost to Fernando, Vivi lost to Sidney, Gizelly defeated Gui, and Cauê defeated Sacha. As a result, Sidney, Fernando, Gizelly, and Cauê moved to the House with immunity, while Gui and Sacha remained in the Stall, joined by Albert and Vivi.
- **^Note 2**: Zaac, holding the Orange flame, had to grant immunity to three contestants in the Save chain (Babi, Fernanda and Juninho). From the Stall, Zé Love nominated Sacha. In the Save chain, Vivi, as the fourth nominee, vetoed Flor from the Farmer challenge. However, using the White flame power, Zé Love nullified Flor's veto and chose to veto Sacha instead, sending him straight to the public vote.
- **^Note 3**: Before the vote, Larissa and Sacha tried to signal each other about the Lamp powers, so both were canceled for breaking the rules. From the Stall, Juninho nominated Larissa. In the Save chain, Fer became the fourth nominee and vetoed Larissa from the Farmer challenge, sending her straight to the public vote.
- **^Note 4**: On Day 22, Raquel was ejected from the game for medical reasons after falling ill in the Fire challenge, with her departure announced to the House the next day.
- **^Note 5**: Lamp power holder Camila chose the Orange flame and gained immunity from the Farmer's nomination, while Sacha received the White flame, which doubled any votes against him. From the Stall, Sacha nominated Zaac. In the Save chain, Cauê became the fourth nominee and vetoed Sacha from the Farmer challenge, sending him straight to the public vote.
- **^Note 6**: Lamp power holder Sidney chose the White flame that granted him R$10,000 if the House went 48 hours without hot water. Albert, holding the Orange flame, had to nullify the votes received by any contestant and chose Fernanda. From the Stall, Sue nominated Nêssa. In the Save chain, Sacha became the fourth nominee and vetoed Sue from the Farmer challenge, sending her straight to the public vote.
- **^Note 7**: Lamp power holder Gui chose the White flame and won immunity for the week along with another contestant of his choice, Sacha. Luana, holding the Orange flame, had to select one contestant from the Stall (Fernanda) and one from the House (Fer) so the second nominee, Julia, could choose one for the third spot (Fer). In the Save chain, Luana became the fourth nominee and vetoed Fer from the Farmer challenge, sending him straight to the public vote.
- **^Note 8**: On Day 43, Fernanda and Zaac walked from the game following a conflict in the preceding days.
- **^Note 9**: Lamp power holder Zé Love chose the White flame, gaining R$5,000 and giving another R$5,000 to Gilsão. From the Stall, Sacha nominated Camila. Sidney, holding the Orange flame, had to select three contestants (Gui, Luana, and Nêssa), and the Farmer, Gilsão, picked one as the fourth nominee: Luana. Luana vetoed Camila from the Farmer challenge, sending her straight to the public vote.
- **^Note 10**: Lamp power holder Juninho chose the Orange flame, allowing him to pick two contestants from the Stall who could be voted on from the House (Flor and Gui). Sidney, holding the Orange flame, had to swap all Stall contestants (Gilsão, Gizelly, Nêssa and Yuri) with four from the House (Albert, Flor, Gui and Zé Love). From the Stall, Sacha nominated Flor. In the Save chain, Gui became the fourth nominee and vetoed Zé Love from the Farmer challenge, sending him straight to the public vote.
- **^Note 11**: Lamp power holder Albert chose the White flame, deciding between immunity or R$10,000 and opting for immunity. Flor, holding the Orange flame, had to pick three contestants from the House (Babi, Flora, and Sidney), who would be the only ones eligible to be voted as the second nominee. From the Stall, Flora chose Nêssa. In the Save chain, Luana became the fourth nominee and vetoed Gizelly from the Farmer challenge, sending her straight to the public vote.
- **^Note 12**: Sacha, holding the Orange flame, had to pick two contestants from the House (Albert and Gilsão) who would be eligible for the Stall nominee spot. From the Stall, Sacha chose Albert. In the Save chain, Lamp power holder Gui became the fourth nominee, which allowed him to veto Albert from the Farmer challenge, sending him straight to the public vote.
- **^Note 13**: Lamp power holder Albert chose the White flame, which granted him R$11,000 if he was not nominated this week (which happened). Flor, holding the Orange flame, had to choose between immunity from the Farmer's nomination, the House vote, or the Save chain, and she chose immunity from the House vote. From the Stall, Luana chose Fer. In the Save chain, Yuri became the fourth nominee and vetoed Fer from the Farmer challenge, sending him straight to the public vote.
- **^Note 14**: Lamp power holder Luana chose the Orange flame, which made her vote on Flora count as four. Sacha, holding the White flame, had to pick two contestants (Albert and Gilsão) for a second vote to determine the fourth nominee. The vote resulted in a tie, with both receiving four votes, so the Farmer of the Week, Yuri, broke the tie by voting for Gilsão, making him the fourth nominee. Gilsão then had to veto one of the other nominees from the Farmer challenge and chose Gui, sending him straight to the public vote.
- **^Note 15**: Lamp power holder Nêssa chose the Orange flame, in which she had to decide between immunity or a R$20,000 prize, and she opted for immunity. Sidney, holding the White flame, had to nominate a fifth contestant (Gui). The fifth nominee also had to veto two other contestants from the Farmer challenge. Gui vetoed Flor and Sacha, sending them straight to the public vote.
- **^Note 16**: On Day 91, the winners of the Final challenge (Gilsão and Sacha) had the power to choose who would face the public vote with them. Sacha chose Albert, Sidney and Yuri, while Gilsão chose Gui, Juninho and Nêssa.
- **^Note 17**: From this point on, the public votes to decide who is evicted and ultimately wins. Following Gilsão's eviction on day 93, the final six contestants were automatically nominated for the final double eviction of the season.
- **^Note 18**: For the final, the public votes for the contestant they want to win A Fazenda 16.

== Ratings and reception ==
=== Brazilian ratings ===
All numbers are in points and provided by Kantar Ibope Media.

| Week | First air date | Last air date | Timeslot (BRT) | Daily SP viewers (in points) | | | | | | | SP viewers (in points) | BR viewers (in points) | Ref. |
| Week | First air date | Last air date | Timeslot (BRT) | Mon | Tue | Wed | Thu | Fri | Sat | Sun | SP viewers (in points) | BR viewers (in points) | Ref. |
|---|---|---|---|---|---|---|---|---|---|---|---|---|---|
| 1 | September 16, 2024 | September 22, 2024 | Monday to Saturday; 10:30 p.m. Sunday; 11:15 p.m. | 6.8 | 5.7 | 5.8 | 6.1 | 6.2 | 4.8 | 5.9 | 5.9 | 5.0 | |
| 2 | September 23 2024 | September 29, 2024 | Monday to Saturday; 10:30 p.m. Sunday; 11:15 p.m. | 5.8 | 5.5 | 5.1 | 6.0 | 7.0 | 5.3 | 4.3 | 5.6 | 4.9 | |
| 3 | September 30, 2024 | October 6, 2024 | Monday to Saturday; 10:30 p.m. Sunday; 11:15 p.m. | 6.4 | 5.7 | 5.4 | 5.5 | 5.6 | 3.7 | 4.4 | 5.2 | 4.6 | |
| 4 | October 7, 2024 | October 13, 2024 | Monday to Saturday; 10:30 p.m. Sunday; 11:15 p.m. | 6.4 | 5.7 | 6.4 | 6.4 | 4.6 | 3.9 | 4.3 | 5.4 | 4.8 | |
| 5 | October 14, 2024 | October 20, 2024 | Monday to Saturday; 10:30 p.m. Sunday; 11:15 p.m. | 4.9 | 4.9 | 5.7 | 5.9 | 5.6 | 4.6 | 4.2 | 5.1 | 4.9 | |
| 6 | October 21, 2024 | October 27, 2024 | Monday to Saturday; 10:30 p.m. Sunday; 11:15 p.m. | 4.8 | 6.1 | 5.9 | 5.6 | 4.9 | 4.8 | 6.0 | 5.4 | 4.8 | |
| 7 | October 28, 2024 | November 3, 2024 | Monday to Saturday; 10:30 p.m. Sunday; 11:15 p.m. | 6.2 | 6.5 | 6.6 | 5.9 | 6.2 | 4.6 | 5.1 | 5.9 | 5.4 | |
| 8 | November 4, 2024 | November 10, 2024 | Monday to Saturday; 10:30 p.m. Sunday; 11:15 p.m. | 5.7 | 6.5 | 6.6 | 6.8 | 6.2 | 4.8 | 4.9 | 5.9 | 5.4 | |
| 9 | November 11, 2024 | November 17, 2024 | Monday to Saturday; 10:30 p.m. Sunday; 11:15 p.m. | 6.0 | 6.5 | 6.7 | 6.4 | 5.9 | 4.5 | 4.7 | 5.8 | 5.2 | |
| 10 | November 18, 2024 | November 24, 2024 | Monday to Saturday; 10:30 p.m. Sunday; 11:15 p.m. | 6.1 | 5.9 | 6.4 | 7.0 | 6.8 | 4.4 | 4.8 | 5.9 | 5.2 | |
| 11 | November 25, 2024 | December 1, 2024 | Monday to Saturday; 10:30 p.m. Sunday; 11:15 p.m. | 5.8 | 6.2 | 6.8 | 6.0 | 6.5 | 3.7 | 4.2 | 5.6 | 5.1 | |
| 12 | December 2, 2024 | December 8, 2024 | Monday to Saturday; 10:30 p.m. Sunday; 11:15 p.m. | 5.2 | 7.0 | 6.4 | 6.1 | 6.1 | 4.4 | 4.8 | 5.7 | 5.2 | |
| 13 | December 9, 2024 | December 15, 2024 | Monday to Saturday; 10:30 p.m. Sunday; 11:15 p.m. | 5.7 | 6.7 | 6.9 | 6.8 | 6.3 | 4.7 | 5.5 | 6.1 | 5.4 | |
| 14 | December 16, 2024 | December 19, 2024 | Monday to Saturday; 10:30 p.m. Sunday; 11:15 p.m. | 6.5 | 6.1 | 5.9 | 7.4 | — | — | — | 6.4 | 5.9 | |

- In 2024, each point represents 253.273 households in 15 market cities in Brazil (73.279 households in São Paulo).
