= A Fazenda 11 =

Season of television series

- Season 11
- Hosted by: Marcos Mion
- No. of days: 87
- No. of contestants: 17
- Winner: Lucas Viana
- Runner-up: Hariany Almeida
- Companion show: A Fazenda Online
- No. of episodes: 84

Release
- Original network: RecordTV
- Original release: September 17 – December 12, 2019

Season chronology
- ← Previous; A Fazenda 10 Next → A Fazenda 12

A Fazenda 11 was the eleventh season of the Brazilian reality television series A Fazenda, which premiered on Tuesday, September 17, 2019, on RecordTV. It was hosted by Marcos Mion. who returned for his second season as the host.

Marcos Mion returned as the main host.

On December 12, 2019, 28-year-old model Lucas Viana won the competition with 59.17% of the public vote over digital influencer Hariany Almeida (28.63%) and advertiser Diego Grossi (12.20%).

== Contestants ==
On September 17, 2019, during the live broadcast of Balanço Geral SP, Andréa Nóbrega and Guilherme Leão were the first two contestants of the reality show to be announced.

Biographical information according to Record official series site, plus footnoted additions.
(ages stated are at time of contest)

Contestant	Age	Background	Hometown	Week 1 team	Merged team	Entered	Exited	Status	Finish
Drika Marinho	40	Dancer	Rio de Janeiro	Sun		Day 1	Day 10	Evicted 1st on September 26, 2019	17th
Phellipe Haagensen	35	Actor	Rio de Janeiro	Sun		Day 1	Day 13	Ejected on September 29, 2019	16th
Aricia Silva	26	Model	Florianópolis	Sun		Day 1	Day 17	Evicted 2nd on October 3, 2019	15th
Túlio Maravilha	50	Former football player	Goiânia	Moon		Day 1	Day 24	Evicted 3rd on October 10, 2019	14th
Tati Dias	29	Businesswoman	São Paulo	Moon		Day 1	Day 31	Evicted 4th on October 17, 2019	13th
Jorge Sousa	39	Event producer	Rio de Janeiro	Sun		Day 15	Day 38	Evicted 5th on October 24, 2019	12th
Bifão	29	Chef	São Paulo	Sun	Final Eleven	Day 1	Day 45	Evicted 6th on October 31, 2019	11th
Andréa Nóbrega	50	Socialite	Rio de Janeiro	Sun	Final Eleven	Day 1	Day 52	Evicted 7th on November 7, 2019	10th
Guilherme Leão	28	Model	São Paulo	Sun	Final Eleven	Day 1	Day 59	Evicted 8th on November 14, 2019	9th
Netto	26	DJ	Goiânia	Sun	Final Eleven	Day 1	Day 66	Evicted 9th on November 21, 2019	8th
Thayse Teixeira	33	Digital influencer	Juazeiro do Norte	Moon	Final Eleven	Day 1	Day 73	Evicted 10th on November 28, 2019	7th
Viny Vieira	40	Comedian	São João Nepomuceno	Sun	Final Eleven	Day 1	Day 76	Evicted 11th on December 01, 2019	6th
Rodrigo Phavanello	42	Actor	Campinas	Moon	Final Eleven	Day 1	Day 84	Evicted 12th on December 9, 2019	5th/4th
Sabrina Paiva	24	Miss São Paulo	Caconde	Moon	Final Eleven	Day 1	Day 84	Evicted 13th on December 9, 2019	5th/4th
Diego Grossi	36	Advertiser	Brasília	Moon	Final Eleven	Day 1	Day 87	Third place on December 12, 2019	3rd
Hariany Almeida	21	Digital influencer	Senador Canedo	Moon	Final Eleven	Day 1	Day 87	Runner-up on December 12, 2019	2nd
Lucas Viana	28	Model	Ipatinga	Moon	Final Eleven	Day 1	Day 87	Winner on December 12, 2019	1st

== Future Appearances ==
In 2022, Bifão appeared on De Férias com o Ex Caribe: Salseiro VIP as original cast member. In 2024, Bifão also appeared on A Grande Conquista 2, she have to compete for a place to enter in the game and she didn't enter.

== The game ==
=== Fire challenge ===
This season, contestants compete in the Fire challenge to win the Lamp power. The Lamp power entitles the holder the two flames (green and red) which may unleash good or bad consequences on the nomination process, with the red flame power defined by the public through of R7.com among two options.

The winner chooses a flame for himself and delegates which contestant holds the other. The Flame holder's choice is marked in bold.

==== Results ====
Week	Players	Winner	Sent to the Stall	Consequences	
Week	Players	Winner	Sent to the Stall	Flame holder	Flame holder's choice
1	Team Moon	Team Moon	~~Andréa~~, ~~Aricia~~, Bifão, Drika, Guilherme, ~~Netto~~, Phellipe, Viny		
1	Team Sun	Team Moon	~~Andréa~~, ~~Aricia~~, Bifão, Drika, Guilherme, ~~Netto~~, Phellipe, Viny		
1	Rodrigo	Netto	**Rodrigo**, Diego, Lucas	Netto: Exchange one contestant from the Stall for one in the House → **Guilherme and Túlio**.	Drika: The Farmer wins R$20.000 if nominates this flame's holder → **Offer refused**.
1	Netto	Netto	**Rodrigo**, Diego, Lucas	Netto: Exchange one contestant from the Stall for one in the House → **Guilherme and Túlio**.	Drika: The Farmer wins R$20.000 if nominates this flame's holder → **Offer refused**.
2	Diego	Diego	**Guilherme**, Lucas, Túlio	Diego: Choose between **being immune from the Farmer's nomination** or from the House nominations.	Rodrigo: The red flame's holder wins R$10.000, but the House will stay 36 hours without water → **Offer refused**.
2	Guilherme	Diego	**Guilherme**, Lucas, Túlio	Diego: Choose between **being immune from the Farmer's nomination** or from the House nominations.	Rodrigo: The red flame's holder wins R$10.000, but the House will stay 36 hours without water → **Offer refused**.
3	Tati	Bifão	**Tati**, Hariany, Thayse	Bifão: Save one of the three nominees → **Andrea**. Then a new nominee will be chosen by a new House voting → **Viny**.	Netto: Veto the vote of three people → **Hariany, Tati and Thayse**.
3	Bifão	Bifão	**Tati**, Hariany, Thayse	Bifão: Save one of the three nominees → **Andrea**. Then a new nominee will be chosen by a new House voting → **Viny**.	Netto: Veto the vote of three people → **Hariany, Tati and Thayse**.
4	Lucas	Jorge	**Lucas**, Guilherme, Netto	Jorge: Won immunity and a double vote.	Andréa: Choose the third nominee among the contestants from the main House → **Diego**.
4	Jorge	Jorge	**Lucas**, Guilherme, Netto	Jorge: Won immunity and a double vote.	Andréa: Choose the third nominee among the contestants from the main House → **Diego**.
5	Diego	Netto	**Diego**, Jorge, Viny	Netto: Safety from being the third nominee and have to save someone too and so on until one contestant left.	Jorge: Wins R$30.000 if replaces the second or the third nominee for someone from their own team → **Andréa** for **Jorge**.
5	Netto	Netto	**Diego**, Jorge, Viny	Netto: Safety from being the third nominee and have to save someone too and so on until one contestant left.	Jorge: Wins R$30.000 if replaces the second or the third nominee for someone from their own team → **Andréa** for **Jorge**.
6	Team Moon	Rodrigo	Andréa, Bifão, Guilherme, Netto, Viny	Rodrigo: Must choose one of the three nominees not to compete the Farmer's race. That is, the chosen pawn goes straight to the public vote → **Bifão**.	Diego: Must immunize a Pawn to the Garden except himself → **Sabrina**.
7	Guilherme	Guilherme	**Hariany**, Sabrina, Viny	Guilherme: Choose a pawn. The vote of the chosen one will have weight two, but every vote he receives will also have weight two → **Thayse**.	Thayse: Shall exchange places with the second or third nominated → **Hariany**.
7	Hariany	Guilherme	**Hariany**, Sabrina, Viny	Guilherme: Choose a pawn. The vote of the chosen one will have weight two, but every vote he receives will also have weight two → **Thayse**.	Thayse: Shall exchange places with the second or third nominated → **Hariany**.
8	Diego	Netto	**Viny**, Guilherme, Lucas, Rodrigo	Netto: You must choose between **being immune to the nomination** or indicating the third nominated.	Rodrigo: From now on, this week's on the stall will have four residents and the fourth resident will be the owner of Power.
8	Lucas	Netto	**Viny**, Guilherme, Lucas, Rodrigo	Netto: You must choose between **being immune to the nomination** or indicating the third nominated.	Rodrigo: From now on, this week's on the stall will have four residents and the fourth resident will be the owner of Power.
8	Netto	Netto	**Viny**, Guilherme, Lucas, Rodrigo	Netto: You must choose between **being immune to the nomination** or indicating the third nominated.	Rodrigo: From now on, this week's on the stall will have four residents and the fourth resident will be the owner of Power.
8	Viny	Netto	**Viny**, Guilherme, Lucas, Rodrigo	Netto: You must choose between **being immune to the nomination** or indicating the third nominated.	Rodrigo: From now on, this week's on the stall will have four residents and the fourth resident will be the owner of Power.
9	Hariany	Thayse	**Hariany**, Netto	Thayse: She has just earned $20,000, and must choose a pawn to earn $10,000 → **Lucas**. And another to become the third nominee, except himself and the Farmer → **Netto**.	Lucas: Shall annul two votes → **Sabrina and Viny**.
9	Thayse	Thayse	**Hariany**, Netto	Thayse: She has just earned $20,000, and must choose a pawn to earn $10,000 → **Lucas**. And another to become the third nominee, except himself and the Farmer → **Netto**.	Lucas: Shall annul two votes → **Sabrina and Viny**.
10	Diego	Diego	**Sabrina**, Viny	Diego: Must choose between nomination immunity or **a prize of $20,000**.	Viny: The Farmer must choose two pawns that are not on the farm → **Diego and Thayse**. The owner of the power must indicate one of the chosen ones to be the third nominee → **Thayse**.
10	Sabrina	Diego	**Sabrina**, Viny	Diego: Must choose between nomination immunity or **a prize of $20,000**.	Viny: The Farmer must choose two pawns that are not on the farm → **Diego and Thayse**. The owner of the power must indicate one of the chosen ones to be the third nominee → **Thayse**.

== Voting history ==
	Week 1	Week 2	Week 3	Week 4	Week 5	Week 6	Week 7	Week 8	Week 9	Week 10	Week 11		Week 12		Nominations received
	Week 1	Week 2	Week 3	Week 4	Week 5	Week 6	Week 7	Week 8	Week 9	Week 10	Day 73	Day 77	Day 81	Finale	Nominations received
Farmer of the Week	Tati	Bifão	Lucas	Viny	Bifão	Lucas	Netto	Sabrina	Diego	Rodrigo	Lucas	Rodrigo	Sabrina	(none)	
Nomination (Farmer)	Bifão	Sabrina	~~Andréa~~	Tati	Rodrigo	Bifão	Sabrina	Guilherme	Viny	Lucas	Rodrigo	Lucas	(none)	(none)	
Nomination (House)	Guilherme	Aricia	Túlio	Bifão	~~Andréa~~	Diego	Andréa	Diego	Rodrigo	Hariany	Viny	Hariany	(none)	(none)	
Nomination (Twist)	Drika	Lucas	Thayse; Viny	Diego	Lucas; Jorge	Netto	~~Hariany~~; Thayse	Lucas	Netto	Thayse	Hariany	Sabrina	(none)	(none)	
Lucas	Andréa	Andréa	Farmer of the Week	Bifão	Andréa	Farmer of the Week	Andréa	Diego	Rodrigo	Diego	Viny	Sabrina	Nominee	Winner (Day 87)	4
Hariany	Andréa	Aricia	~~Viny~~	Bifão	Andréa	Diego	Andréa	Diego	Rodrigo	Diego	Viny	Sabrina	Nominee	Runner-Up (Day 87)	14
Hariany	Andréa	Aricia	Viny	Bifão	Andréa	Diego	Andréa	Diego	Rodrigo	Diego	Viny	Sabrina	Nominee	Runner-Up (Day 87)	14
Diego	Guilherme	Aricia	Viny	Bifão	Andréa	Thayse	Andréa	Thayse	Farmer of the Week	Hariany	Sabrina	Hariany	Saved	Third Place (Day 87)	17
Diego	Guilherme	Aricia	Viny	Bifão	Andréa	Thayse	Andréa	Thayse	Farmer of the Week	Hariany	Sabrina	Hariany	Saved	Third Place (Day 87)	17
Sabrina	Guilherme	Aricia	Viny	Bifão	Andréa	Hariany	Andréa	Diego	~~Thayse~~	Hariany	Viny	Hariany	Nominee	Evicted (Day 84)	7
Sabrina	Guilherme	Aricia	Viny	Bifão	Andréa	Hariany	Andréa	Diego	~~Thayse~~	Hariany	Viny	Hariany	Nominee	Evicted (Day 84)	7
Rodrigo	Andréa	Aricia	Viny	Bifão	Andréa	Diego	Andréa	Hariany	Thayse	Hariany	Hariany	Hariany	Nominee	Evicted (Day 84)	11
Rodrigo	Andréa	Aricia	Viny	Bifão	Andréa	Diego	Andréa	Hariany	Thayse	Hariany	Hariany	Hariany	Nominee	Evicted (Day 84)	11
Viny	Sabrina	Thayse	Túlio	Farmer of the Week	Thayse	Thayse	Lucas	Thayse	~~Thayse~~	Hariany	Hariany	Evicted (Day 76)			15
Viny	Sabrina	Thayse	Rodrigo	Farmer of the Week	Thayse	Thayse	Lucas	Thayse	~~Thayse~~	Hariany	Hariany	Evicted (Day 76)			15
Thayse	Guilherme	Aricia	~~Viny~~	Bifão	Andréa	Diego	Andréa (x2)	Diego	Rodrigo	Diego	Evicted (Day 73)				17
Thayse	Guilherme	Aricia	Viny	Bifão	Andréa	Diego	Andréa (x2)	Diego	Rodrigo	Diego	Evicted (Day 73)				17
Netto	Guilherme	Tati	Túlio	Diego	Thayse	Diego	Farmer of the Week	Hariany	Lucas	Evicted (Day 66)					0
Netto	Guilherme	Tati	Rodrigo	Diego	Thayse	Diego	Farmer of the Week	Hariany	Lucas	Evicted (Day 66)					0
Guilherme	Sabrina	Diego	Túlio	Diego	Thayse	Rodrigo	Thayse (x2)	Thayse	Evicted (Day 59)						8
Guilherme	Sabrina	Diego	Rodrigo	Diego	Thayse	Rodrigo	Thayse (x2)	Thayse	Evicted (Day 59)						8
Andréa	Guilherme	Diego	Túlio	Diego	Thayse	Thayse	Thayse (x2)	Evicted (Day 52)							19
Andréa	Guilherme	Diego	Exempt	Diego	Thayse	Thayse	Thayse (x2)	Evicted (Day 52)							19
Bifão	Guilherme	Farmer of the Week	Túlio	Diego	Farmer of the Week	Rodrigo	Evicted (Day 45)								9
Bifão	Guilherme	Farmer of the Week	Exempt	Diego	Farmer of the Week	Rodrigo	Evicted (Day 45)								9
Jorge	Not in house		Exempt	Hariany (x2)	Thayse	Evicted (Day 38)									0
Tati	Farmer of the Week	Aricia	~~Viny~~	Bifão	Evicted (Day 31)										2
Tati	Farmer of the Week	Aricia	Viny	Bifão	Evicted (Day 31)										2
Túlio	Aricia	Aricia	Viny	Evicted (Day 24)											5
Túlio	Aricia	Aricia	Viny	Evicted (Day 24)											5
Aricia	Guilherme	Rodrigo	Evicted (Day 17)												8
Phellipe	Hariany	Ejected (Day 13)													0
Drika	Andréa	Evicted (Day 10)													0
Notes	1	2, 3, 4, 5	6, 7, 8	9	10, 11	12, 13, 14	15, 16, 17	18, 19	20, 21	22, 23	24, 25	26, 27, 28	29	30	
Up for nomination	Bifão; Drika; Guilherme	Aricia; Lucas; Sabrina	Thayse; Túlio; Viny	Bifão; Diego; Tati	Jorge; Lucas; Rodrigo	Bifão; Diego; Netto	Andréa; Sabrina; Thayse	Diego; Guilherme; Lucas	Netto; Rodrigo; Viny	Hariany; Lucas; Thayse	Hariany; Rodrigo; Viny	Hariany; Lucas; Sabrina	Diego; Hariany; Lucas; Rodrigo; Sabrina	(none)	
Saved	Bifão	Lucas	Viny	Bifão	Lucas	Netto	Sabrina	Diego	Rodrigo	Lucas	Rodrigo	Sabrina	Diego	(none)	
Nominated for eviction	Drika; Guilherme	Aricia; Sabrina	Thayse; Túlio	Diego; Tati	Jorge; Rodrigo	Bifão; Diego	Andréa; Thayse	Guilherme; Lucas	Netto; Viny	Hariany; Thayse	Hariany; Viny	Hariany; Lucas	Hariany; Lucas; Rodrigo; Sabrina	Diego; Hariany; Lucas	
Ejected	(none)	Phellipe	(none)												
Evicted	Drika; 46.16% to save	Aricia; 43.28% to save	Túlio; 41.46% to save	Tati; 48.68% to save	Jorge; 43.46% to save	Bifão; 40.95% to save	Andréa; 37.17% to save	Guilherme; 21.35% to save	Netto; 28.35% to save	Thayse; 43.10% to save	Viny; 25.04% to save	Eviction cancelled	Rodrigo; 1.53% to save	Diego; 12.20% to win	
Evicted	Drika; 46.16% to save	Aricia; 43.28% to save	Túlio; 41.46% to save	Tati; 48.68% to save	Jorge; 43.46% to save	Bifão; 40.95% to save	Andréa; 37.17% to save	Guilherme; 21.35% to save	Netto; 28.35% to save	Thayse; 43.10% to save	Viny; 25.04% to save	Eviction cancelled	Rodrigo; 1.53% to save	Hariany; 28.63% to win	
Evicted	Drika; 46.16% to save	Aricia; 43.28% to save	Túlio; 41.46% to save	Tati; 48.68% to save	Jorge; 43.46% to save	Bifão; 40.95% to save	Andréa; 37.17% to save	Guilherme; 21.35% to save	Netto; 28.35% to save	Thayse; 43.10% to save	Viny; 25.04% to save	Eviction cancelled	Sabrina; 5.98% to save	Hariany; 28.63% to win	
Evicted	Drika; 46.16% to save	Aricia; 43.28% to save	Túlio; 41.46% to save	Tati; 48.68% to save	Jorge; 43.46% to save	Bifão; 40.95% to save	Andréa; 37.17% to save	Guilherme; 21.35% to save	Netto; 28.35% to save	Thayse; 43.10% to save	Viny; 25.04% to save	Eviction cancelled	Sabrina; 5.98% to save	Lucas; 59.17% to win	

=== Notes ===
- ^Note 1 : Guilherme, as the second nominee, had to choose the third nominee among the contestants living in the stall (Diego, Drika, Lucas, Phellipe, Rodrigo, Túlio and Viny). Drika was chosen.
- ^Note 2 : Phellipe was ejected from the game live on day 13 due to inappropriate behavior, sexual harassment and misconduct towards Hariany during an argument on day 12.
- ^Note 3 : Jorge entered the game on day 15 as Phellipe's replacement. As result, he was exempt from nominations on week 3.
- ^Note 4 : Due to the Green flame power, Diego was immune from the Farmer of the Week's nomination.
- ^Note 5 : Aricia, as the second nominee, had to choose the third nominee among the contestants living in the stall (Guilherme, Lucas and Túlio). Lucas was chosen.
- ^Note 6 : After Andrea was nominated by Farmer of the Week Lucas, Viny received the most votes from the House with 7, so Netto used his Red flame power to nullify 3 votes on him (from Hariany, Tati and Thayse), making Túlio (who received 5 votes) nominated in his place. Then, Túlio chose Thayse (between the three contestants who are in the Stall) to be the third nominee.
- ^Note 7 : Túlio, as the second nominee, had to choose the third nominee among the contestants living in the stall (Hariany, Tati and Thayse). Thayse was chosen.
- ^Note 8 : After the three nominees have been determined, Bifão used her Green flame power to save Andréa. As result, a new House vote would be made to determine who would replace her, with both of them being exempt from this new round of nominations. Viny received the most votes from the House for the second time and was nominated.
- ^Note 9 : Jorge used his Green flame power to become immune from this week's nominations and make his vote on Hari counted as two. Then, Andréa had to use her Red flame power to make the third nominee a contestant from the main House, instead of the ones living at the stall (Lucas, Guilherme and Netto). She chose Diego.
- ^Note 10 : Due to the Green flame power, Netto was saved from becoming the third nominee and was asked to save someone and so on until one contestant left. He saved Guilherme, who saved Jorge, who saved Viny, who saved Sabrina, who saved Diego, who saved Hariany, who saved Thayse, leaving Lucas as the third nominee.
- ^Note 11 : Jorge, the Red flame power holder, had a dilemma: he would win R$ 30.000 if he replaced the second or the third nominee for someone of his own team (Sun). He chose to save Andréa and nominate himself.
- ^Note 12 : Diego had to use her the Red flame power to immunize a contestant of the Week's nomination, except himself. He immunized Sabrina.
- ^Note 13 : Diego, as the second nominee, had to choose the third nominee among the contestants living in the stall (Andréa, Guilherme, Netto and Viny). Netto was chosen.
- ^Note 14 : After the three nominees have been determined, Rodrigo used his the Green flame power to choose one of the nominees not to compete for the Farmer race and go straight to the public vote. He chose Bifão.
- ^Note 15 : Guilherme used his the Green for power to choose a contestant to have a double vote but every vote received would also count as double. He chose Thayse.
- ^Note 16 : Andréa, as the second nominee, had to choose the third nominee among the contestants living in the stall (Hariany and Viny). Hariany was chosen.
- ^Note 17 : After the three nominees have been determined, Thayse had to use her Red flame power to replace the second or the third nominee for herself. She chose to save Hariany.
- ^Note 18 : Due to the Green flame power, Netto was immune from this week's nominations.
- ^Note 19 : Diego, as the second nominee, had to choose the third nominee among the contestants living in the stall (Lucas, Rodrigo and Viny). Lucas was chosen.
- ^Note 20 : After Viny was nominated by Farmer of the Week Diego, Rodrigo and Thayse received the most votes from the House with 3 each, so Lucas used his Red flame power to nullify 2 votes on Thayse (from Sabrina and Viny), making Rodrigo nominated.
- ^Note 21 : Thayse used her Green flame power to earn R$ 20.000, and has choose a contestant to earn R$ 10.000 and another to become the third nominee. She chose to give the prize to Lucas and nominate Netto.
- ^Note 22 : Diego and Hariany received the most nominations with 3 each. Rodrigo, as Farmer of the Week, had the casting vote and choose Hariany to be the second nominee.
- ^Note 23 : Viny used his Red flame power for the Farmer of the Week Rodrigo to choose two contestants who are not in the nomination, for him to nominate one of the chosen ones to be the third nominee. The Farmer of the Week chose Diego and Thayse for his nomination and he nominate Thayse.
- ^Note 24 : Hariany and Viny received the most nominations with 2 each. Lucas, as Farmer of the Week, had the casting vote and choose Viny to be the second nominee.
- ^Note 25 : Viny, as the second nominee, had to choose the third nominee among the contestants living in the main House (Diego, Hariany and Sabrina). Hariany was chosen.
- ^Note 26 : Hariany and Sabrina received the most nominations with 2 each. Rodrigo, as Farmer of the Week, had the casting vote and choose Hariany to be the second nominee.
- ^Note 27 : Hariany, as the second nominee, had to choose the third nominee among the contestants living in the main House (Diego and Sabrina). Sabrina was chosen.
- ^Note 28 : On day 78, during the last Farmer's Challenge, Lucas and Sabrina committed and were misled at various points along the way. On day 80, after a more accurate analysis of the participants' performance in the activity, the reality production decided to cancel the Farmer's Challenge. Due to the cancellation of the Farmer's Challenge, the planned eviction was cancelled. Sabrina, once misled, remained in the position and with the R$ 20.000 earned in the race.
- ^Note 29 : On day 81, the five eligible contestants competed in the final immunity challenge for place in the final. Diego was the winner and became the first finalist of the season. Hariany, Lucas, Rodrigo and Sabrina were automatically nominated for the final eviction of the season.
- ^Note 30 : For the final, the public votes for the contestant they want to win A Fazenda 11.

== Ratings and reception ==
=== Brazilian ratings ===
All numbers are in points and provided by Kantar Ibope Media.

Week	First air date	Last air date	Timeslot (BRT)	Daily SP viewers (in points)							SP viewers (in points)	BR viewers (in points)	Ref.
Week	First air date	Last air date	Timeslot (BRT)	Mon	Tue	Wed	Thu	Fri	Sat	Sun	SP viewers (in points)	BR viewers (in points)	Ref.
1	September 17, 2019	September 22, 2019	Monday to Friday; 10:45 p.m. Saturday; 10:15 p.m. Sunday; 11:15 p.m.	—	9.7	9.7	8.6	8.3	6.0	6.9	8.2	6.8	
2	September 23, 2019	September 29, 2019	Monday to Friday; 10:45 p.m. Saturday; 10:15 p.m. Sunday; 11:15 p.m.	8.3	8.6	9.0	7.7	7.9	7.5	9.2	8.3	7.1	
3	September 30, 2019	October 6, 2019	Monday to Friday; 10:45 p.m. Saturday; 10:15 p.m. Sunday; 11:15 p.m.	8.8	8.7	8.3	8.2	9.2	6.3	6.4	7.9	6.9	
4	October 7, 2019	October 13, 2019	Monday to Friday; 10:45 p.m. Saturday; 10:15 p.m. Sunday; 11:15 p.m.	7.0	9.0	8.5	8.3	7.9	6.1	7.6	7.7	6.8	
5	October 14, 2019	October 20, 2019	Monday to Friday; 10:45 p.m. Saturday; 10:15 p.m. Sunday; 11:15 p.m.	9.7	10.1	9.2	9.0	8.5	7.2	7.4	8.7	7.0	
6	October 21, 2019	October 27, 2019	Monday to Friday; 10:45 p.m. Saturday; 10:15 p.m. Sunday; 11:15 p.m.	8.3	8.9	9.0	9.4	9.4	6.4	7.5	8.4		
7	October 28, 2019	November 3, 2019	Monday to Friday; 10:45 p.m. Saturday; 10:15 p.m. Sunday; 11:15 p.m.	9.0	10.0	10.1	9.0						
8	November 4, 2019	November 10, 2019	Monday to Friday; 10:45 p.m. Saturday; 10:15 p.m. Sunday; 11:15 p.m.										
9	November 11, 2019	November 17, 2019	Monday to Friday; 10:45 p.m. Saturday; 10:15 p.m. Sunday; 11:15 p.m.										
10	November 18, 2019	November 24, 2019	Monday to Friday; 10:45 p.m. Saturday; 10:15 p.m. Sunday; 11:15 p.m.										
11	November 25, 2019	December 1, 2019	Monday to Friday; 10:45 p.m. Saturday; 10:15 p.m. Sunday; 11:15 p.m.										
12	December 2, 2019	December 8, 2019	Monday to Friday; 10:45 p.m. Saturday; 10:15 p.m. Sunday; 11:15 p.m.										
13	December 9, 2019	December 12, 2019	Monday to Friday; 10:45 p.m. Saturday; 10:15 p.m. Sunday; 11:15 p.m.					—	—	—			

- In 2019, each point represents 254.892 households in 15 market cities in Brazil (73.015 households in São Paulo).
