= A Fazenda 1 =

Season of television series

- Season 1
- Hosted by: Britto Júnior
- No. of days: 85
- No. of contestants: 15
- Winner: Dado Dolabella
- Runner-up: Danni Carlos
- No. of episodes: 81

Release
- Original network: RecordTV
- Original release: May 31 – August 23, 2009

Season chronology
- Next → A Fazenda 2

A Fazenda 1 (Note: (formerly called as A Fazenda)) was the first season of the Brazilian reality television series A Fazenda, which premiered on Sunday, May 31, 2009, on RecordTV. It was hosted by Britto Júnior and reports by Chris Couto. The direction was handled by Rodrigo Carelli, Bruno Gomes, Chica Barros, and Rogerio Farah.

On August 23, 2009, 28-year-old actor Dado Dolabella won the competition with 83% of the public vote over singer Danni Carlos (17%).

== Production ==
=== Cast ===
There were fifteen celebrity contestants competing for the grand prize, which was R$ 1 million without tax allowances with a brand new car offered to the runner-up. The season lasted 85 days, making this the shortest season until A Fazenda 8.

== Contestants ==
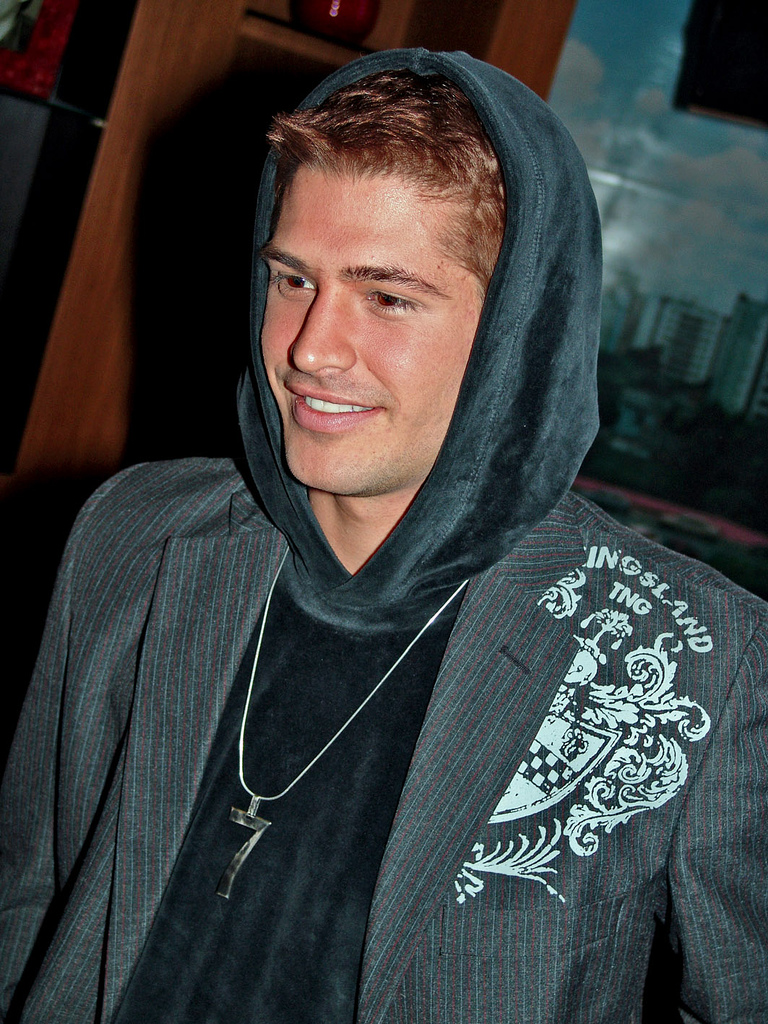
Dado Dolabella, winner of the first season.

Below is biographical information according to the Record official site, plus footnoted additions.
(ages stated are correct at the start of the contest)

Contestant	Age	Background	Hometown	Status	Finish
Franciely Freduzeski	30	Actress	Laranjeiras do Sul	Eliminated 1st on June 7, 2009	15th
Bárbara Koboldt	33	Reporter	Porto Alegre	Walked on June 8, 2009	14th
Babi Xavier	34	TV Host	Niterói	Eliminated 2nd on June 14, 2009	13th
Théo Becker	32	Actor	Pelotas	Eliminated 3rd on June 21, 2009	12th
Fabio Arruda	38	Style consultant	Rio de Janeiro	Eliminated 4th on June 28, 2009	11th
Miro Moreira	25	Model	São Paulo	Eliminated 5th on July 5, 2009	10th
Luciele di Camargo	31	Actress	Goiânia	Eliminated 6th on July 12, 2009	9th
Mirella Santos	25	Dancer	Florianópolis	Eliminated 7th on July 19, 2009	8th
Jonathan Haagensen	25	Actor	Rio de Janeiro	Eliminated 8th on July 26, 2009	7th
Fabiana Alvarez	32	Actress	São José	Eliminated 9th on August 2, 2009	6th
Danielle Souza	28	Model	Lages	Eliminated 10th on August 9, 2009	5th
Pedro Leonardo	22	Musician	Anápolis	Eliminated 11th on August 16, 2009	4th
Carlinhos Silva	28	Comedian	São Paulo	Eliminated 12th on August 19, 2009	3rd
Danni Carlos	33	Singer	Rio de Janeiro	Runner-up on August 23, 2009	2nd
Dado Dolabella	28	Actor	Rio de Janeiro	Winner on August 23, 2009	1st

== Future appearances ==
In 2011, Franciely Freduzeski was contender to be a competitor on A Fazenda 4, but ultimately did not return.

In 2017, Théo Becker appeared in Dancing Brasil 2, he finished in 9th place in the competition.

In 2017, Fábio Arruda returned to compete in A Fazenda 9, he finished in 14th place in the competition.

In 2019, Babi Xavier appeared in Popstar 3, she finished in 10th place in the competition, in 2023, Xavier appeared on Bake Off Celebridades 3, she finished in 13th place in the competition.

== Voting history ==
	Week 1	Week 2	Week 3	Week 4	Week 5	Week 6	Week 7	Week 8	Week 9	Week 10	Week 11	Week 12	
	Week 1	Week 2	Week 3	Week 4	Week 5	Week 6	Week 7	Week 8	Week 9	Week 10	Week 11	Day 78	Finale
Farmer of the Week	Dado	Théo	Pedro	Luciele	Carlinhos	Danielle	Fabiana	Danielle	Carlinhos	Pedro	(none)		
Nominated (Challenge)	Luciele	Danielle	Jonathan	Fabio	Danni	Carlinhos	Mirella	Jonathan	Danni	Danielle	(none)		
Nominated (House)	Franciely	Babi	Théo	Pedro	Miro	Luciele	Jonathan	Danni	Fabiana	Dado	(none)		
Nominated (Farmer)	Mirella	Jonathan	Miro	Dado	Dado	Fabiana	Dado	Dado	Dado	Danni	(none)		
Dado	Farmer of the Week	Babi	Théo	Pedro	Miro	Pedro	Jonathan	Fabiana	Fabiana	Carlinhos	Nominee	Nominee	Winner (Day 85)
Danni	Franciely	Babi	Théo	Fabiana	Miro	Fabiana	Jonathan	Fabiana	Fabiana	Carlinhos	Nominee	Nominee	Runner-up (Day 85)
Carlinhos	Pedro	Pedro	Miro	Dado	Farmer of the Week	Luciele	Pedro	Pedro	Farmer of the Week	Dado	Immune	Nominee	Evicted (Day 81)
Pedro	Carlinhos	Carlinhos	Farmer of the Week	Carlinhos	Mirella	Dado	Carlinhos	Carlinhos	Dado	Farmer of the Week	Nominee	Evicted (Day 78)	
Danielle	Franciely	Babi	Théo	Mirella	Luciele	Farmer of the Week	Jonathan	Farmer of the Week	Pedro	Dado	Evicted (Day 71)		
Fabiana	Not in house		Théo	Danni	Pedro	Jonathan	Farmer of the Week	Danni	Dado	Evicted (Day 64)			
Jonathan	Bárbara	Miro	Théo	Dado	Fabiana	Mirella	Danielle	Danni	Evicted (Day 57)				
Mirella	Théo	Fabio	Théo	Danielle	Luciele	Luciele	Jonathan	Evicted (Day 50)					
Luciele	Franciely	Miro	Théo	Farmer of the Week	Miro	Mirella	Evicted (Day 43)						
Miro	Pedro	Jonathan	Théo	Pedro	Luciele	Evicted (Day 36)							
Fabio	Bárbara	Mirella	Théo	Pedro	Evicted (Day 29)								
Théo	Mirella	Farmer of the Week	Miro	Evicted (Day 22)									
Babi	Bárbara	Danni	Evicted (Day 15)										
Bárbara	Franciely	Walked (Day 9)											
Franciely	Bárbara	Evicted (Day 8)											
Notes	1, 2	(none)			3	4	(none)	5	6	7	8	9	10
Walked	(none)	Bárbara	(none)										
Nominated for Eviction	Luciele; Franciely; Mirella	Danielle; Babi; Jonathan	Jonathan; Théo; Miro	Fabio; Pedro; Dado	Danni; Miro; Dado	Carlinhos; Luciele; Fabiana	Mirella; Jonathan; Dado	Jonathan; Danni; Dado	Danni; Fabiana; Dado	Danielle; Dado; Danni	Dado; Danni; Pedro	Carlinhos; Dado; Danni	Dado; Danni
Evicted	Franciely; 45.3% to evict	Babi; 50.8% to evict	Théo; 51.8% to evict	Fabio; 59.8% to evict	Miro; 67.5% to evict	Luciele; 48.4% to evict	Mirella; 49.5% to evict	Jonathan; 69% to evict	Fabiana; 67.6% to evict	Danielle; 60% to evict	Pedro; 68% to evict	Carlinhos; 65% to evict	Danni; 17% to win
Evicted	Franciely; 45.3% to evict	Babi; 50.8% to evict	Théo; 51.8% to evict	Fabio; 59.8% to evict	Miro; 67.5% to evict	Luciele; 48.4% to evict	Mirella; 49.5% to evict	Jonathan; 69% to evict	Fabiana; 67.6% to evict	Danielle; 60% to evict	Pedro; 68% to evict	Carlinhos; 65% to evict	Dado; 83% to win

=== Notes ===
- ^Note 1 : The first Farmer of the Week (Dado) was chosen by the public through an online vote.
- ^Note 2 : Bárbara and Franciely were tied with 4 votes each. First nominee Luciele, the first nominee, had the casting vote and chose to nominate Franciely.
- ^Note 3 : Luciele and Miro were tied with 3 votes each. First nominee Danni had the casting vote and chose to nominate Miro.
- ^Note 4 : Luciele and Mirella were tied with 2 votes each. First nominee Carlinhos had the casting vote and chose to nominate Luciele.
- ^Note 5 : Danni and Fabiana were tied with 2 votes each. First nominee Jonathan had the casting vote and chose to nominate Danni.
- ^Note 6 : Dado and Fabiana were tied with 2 votes each. First nominee Danni had the casting vote and chose to nominate Fabiana.
- ^Note 7 : Carlinhos and Dado were tied with 2 votes each. First nominee Danielle had the casting vote and chose to nominate Dado.
- ^Note 8 : Carlinhos won the final challenge and won immunity. Therefore, Dado, Danni and Pedro were automatically nominated.
- ^Note 9 : The final three contestants were automatically nominated for the final eviction.
- ^Note 10 : For the final, the public votes for the contestant they want to win A Fazenda 1.
