= Danielle Souza =

Brazilian model, reporter and businesswoman

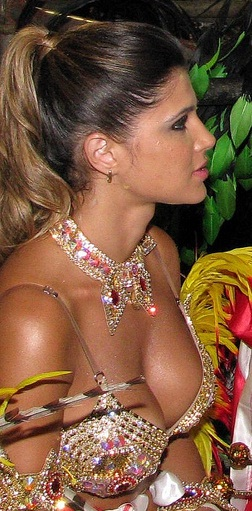
- Souza in 2010
- Born: Danielle Aparecida Jesus de Souza; 2 January 1981 (age 45); Lages, Santa Catarina, Brazil
- Other names: Dani Souza; Dani Samambaia
- Occupations: Model, reporter and businesswoman
- Spouse: Dentinho (m. 2012)
- Children: 3
- Modeling information
- Height: 1.70 m (5 ft 7 in)
- Hair color: Dark brown
- Eye color: Dark brown

Danielle Souza (born 2 January 1981) is a Brazilian model, reporter and businesswoman.

== Career ==
In 2003, after winning the Felinas beauty pageant in São Paulo, Souza and Antonela Avellaneda (first runner-up) starred in the November issue of Playboy magazine as "As Felinas" (The Felines). Souza gained fame playing the role of "Mulher Samambaia" (Fern Woman) in the pilot show of Pânico na TV, a satire consisting of beautiful women who stand on stage just to grace the scenery. After making regular appearances on the show, she gained attention in the modelling world.

Souza was on the cover of the magazine Sexy in December 2004 and August 2007.

Shortly after her departure from Pânico na TV in 2009, Souza was a favorite contestant in the first season of the reality show A Fazenda. Taking advantage of this, the magazine Sexy published a special edition of its photo essay of August 2007, but with previously unpublished photos and without Souza's permission.

She owns the brand Zami Concept and maintains several company stores.

== Personal life ==
Souza dated model Gustavo Mendonça from 2006 to May 2009.

Souza began dating footballer Dentinho in March 2011. They were married in São Paulo on 9 June 2012. Now living in Ukraine, they have three children: son Bruno Lucas (born 2012) and identical twins Sophia and Rafaella (born 2014). She converted to Buddhism in 2017.

== Filmography ==
=== Television ===
Year	Title	Role	Notes
2003–2009	Pânico na TV	Herself / Mulher Samambaia	Panicat
2007	Qual é a Música?	Herself / Mulher Samambaia	Episode: "Pânico na TV"
2008	Nada Além da Verdade	Herself / Mulher Samambaia	Season 1, Episode 12
2009	A Fazenda 1	Contestant	Eliminated 10th
2010–2011	Tudo É Possível	Reporter	Segment: "Saindo da Rotina"
