= Dado Dolabella =

Brazilian actor and singer

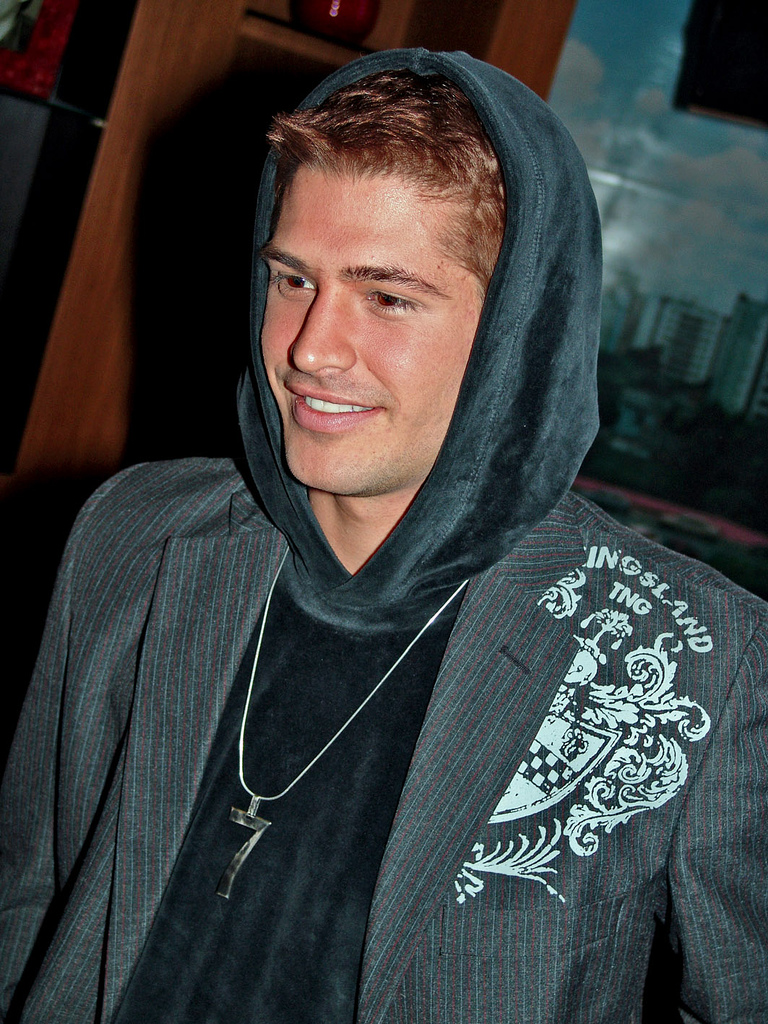
- Born: Carlos Eduardo Bouças Dolabella Filho; July 20, 1980 (age 45); Rio de Janeiro, Brazil
- Occupation: Actor
- Years active: 2001–present

Carlos Eduardo Bouças Dolabella Filho (born July 20, 1980), best known as Dado Dolabella, is a Brazilian actor and singer. In 2016 he became an advocate for the vegan lifestyle.

== Biography ==
Dolabella was born in Rio de Janeiro, the son of the Brazilian actor Carlos Eduardo Dolabella and the Spanish-born actress Pepita Rodríguez.

Dolabella adopted a vegan lifestyle in 2015 and has turned into an activist of the cause by posting on social media and promoting veganism. He has also been a vocal supporter of the feminist movement.

== Career ==
=== Television ===
- 2014 - Vitória .... Léo
- 2012 - Máscaras .... Eduardo Sotero Filho (Edu)
- 2008 - Chamas da Vida .... Antônio Galvão Ferreira
- 2006 - Cristal .... João Pedro Ascânio
- 2004 - Senhora do Destino .... Plínio Ferreira da Silva
- 2003 - A Casa das Sete Mulheres .... Bento "Bentinho" Filho
- 2003 - Sexo Frágil .... Gerônimo
- 2001 - Malhação .... Robson Silveira Sampaio

=== Film ===
- 2005 - Gaijin 2: Love Me as I Am .... Brother

=== Self ===
- 2008 - Louca Família
- 2009 - A Fazenda 1

=== Discography ===
- 2003 - Dado pra Você
- 2004 - Mais do Mesmo
- 2009 - Relax

Preceded by First	Winner of A Fazenda; A Fazenda 1	Succeeded by Karina Bacchi
