= A Fazenda =

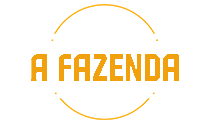
- Genre: Reality competition
- Created by: Strix Television; Sony Pictures Television
- Based on: The Farm
- Developed by: 2waytraffic Endemol
- Directed by: Rodrigo Carelli; Fernando Viudez
- Presented by: Britto Júnior (2009–14); Roberto Justus (2015–17); Marcos Mion (2018–2020); Adriane Galisteu (2021–present)
- Opening theme: Based on "Stayin' Alive" by the Bee Gees
- Composer: Marco Camargo
- Country of origin: Brazil
- Original language: Portuguese
- No. of seasons: 19 (18 regular seasons; 1 spin-off)
- No. of episodes: 1630 (Until the 18th edition)

Production
- Production locations: Itu (2009–15); Itapecerica da Serra (2017–present)
- Camera setup: Multiple-camera
- Running time: 60 minutes

Original release
- Network: RecordTV
- Release: May 31, 2009 – present

Related
- The Farm; Fazenda de Verão

A Fazenda (Note: (English: The Farm; Portuguese pronunciation: [a fɐˈzẽdɐ])) is a Brazilian Reality television based on the Swedish television series of the same name that was originally created in 2001 by Strix and produced in association with Sony Entertainment and Endemol. The series premiered on Sunday, May 31, 2009, on RecordTV.

The show is based on a group of celebrities living together twenty-four hours a day on a Farm (located in Itu during the first eight seasons, and in Itapecerica da Serra since season nine), isolated from the outside world (primarily from mass media, such as newspapers, telephones, television and the internet) while having all their steps followed by cameras around-the-clock, with no privacy for three months.

The contestants compete for the chance to win the grand prize by avoiding weekly eviction, until the last celebrity remains at the end of the season that can claim the grand prize. The show was originally presented by news reporter Britto Junior, a position he held throughout the first seven seasons. Roberto Justus later replaced Britto as the host of the series from the eighth season onwards.

Since 2010, the subscription-based live feeds are available directly through R7.com. In order to preserve the drama for television broadcasts, RecordTV does not webcast certain moments that transpire in the house, including weekly competitions.

== Format ==
A property with over 150 thousand square meters in Itu, in the countryside of São Paulo, was especially prepared, with camera installations, power towers, microphones and all necessary infrastructure for the production. After eight seasons, the reality show leaves the Toca dos Leões site in Itu and moves to Toca do Tuim, located in Itapecerica da Serra.

Each season, the 14–24 celebrities, such as actors, singers, models, digital influencers, or media personalities, known as Farmers, need to prove abilities to work in the country: wake up very early, take care of the cows, wash the horses, collect eggs from chickens, harvest greens, and more. The show airs daily and each season lasts about three months.

== Season chronology ==
Season	Number of farmers	Number of weeks	Finalists							
Season	Number of farmers	Number of weeks	Winner	Vote	Runner-up	Vote	Third place	Vote	Fourth place	Vote
1	15	12	Dado Dolabella	83%	Danni Carlos	17%	—N/a		—N/a	
2	14	13	Karina Bacchi	56%	André Segatti	44%	—N/a		—N/a	
3	15	12	Daniel Bueno	44%	Sérgio Abreu	40%	Lizi Benites	16%	—N/a	
4	16	12	Joana Machado	48%	Monique Evans	44%	Raquel Pacheco	8%	—N/a	
5	16	13	Viviane Araújo	84%	Felipe Folgosi	12%	Léo Áquilla	4%	—N/a	
6	16	14	Bárbara Evans	54.87%	Denise Rocha	41.28%	Marcos Oliver	3.85%	—N/a	
7	17	13	DH Silveira	44.38%	Babi Rossi	37.05%	Heloísa Faissol	18.57%	—N/a	
8	16	11	Douglas Sampaio	52.90%	Ana Paula Minerato	46.58%	Luka Ribeiro	0.52%	—N/a	
9	16	13	Flávia Viana	56.37%	Marcos Härter	40.26%	Matheus Lisboa	3.37%	—N/a	
10	16	12	Rafael Ilha	62.51%	João Zoli	35.77%	Caíque Aguiar	1.72%	—N/a	
11	17	12	Lucas Viana	59.17%	Hariany Almeida	28.63%	Diego Grossi	12.20%	—N/a	
12	20	14	Jojo Todynho	52.54% (out of 3)	Biel	36.10% (out of 3)	Stéfani Bays	11.36% (out of 3)	Lipe Ribeiro	4.87% (out of 4)
13	21	13	Rico Melquiades	77.47% (out of 3)	Bil Araújo	18.83% (out of 3)	Solange Gomes	3.70% (out of 3)	Marina Ferrari	2.77% (out of 4)
14	21	13	Bárbara Borges	61.14%	Bia Miranda	35.03%	Iran Malfitano	3.83%	—N/a	
15	22	13	Jaquelline Grohalski	56.17%	André Gonçalves	25.77%	Marcia Fu	12.78%	WL Guimarães	5.28%
16	24	13	Sacha Bali	50.93%	Sidney Sampaio	23.98%	Yuri Bonotto	18.46%	Gui Vieira	6.63%
17	26	13	Dudu Camargo	75.88%	Duda Wendling	14.57%	Saory Cardoso	9.23%	Fabiano Moraes	0.32%
18	26	13		%		%		%		%

=== Fazenda de Verão ===
Fazenda de Verão (English: Summer Farm) was spin-off of A Fazenda, but with anonymous people, instead of the celebrities playing the role of farmers. Rodrigo Faro was the host, replacing Britto Junior from the main celebrity version.

Season	Number of farmers	Number of weeks	Finalists					
Season	Number of farmers	Number of weeks	Winner	Vote	Runner-up	Vote	Third place	Vote
1	22	13	Angelis Borges	69%	Ísis Gomes	23%	Thyago Gesta	8%

== Records ==
=== Highest number of rejections ===
#	Season	Week	Voting Results						Ref.
1	15	13 (Day 93)	Lily Nobre; 0.78% to save	Tonzão Chagas; 2.15% to save	WL Guimarães; 5.47% to save	Marcia Fu; 13.32% to save	André Gonçalves; 23.80% to save	Jaquelline Grohalski; 54.48% to save	
2	16	13 (Day 91)	Albert Bressan; 0.85% to save		Sidney Sampaio; 18.99% to save		Yuri Bonotto; 31.87% to save	Sacha Bali; 48.30% to save	
3	16	13 (Day 93)	Vanessa Carvalho; 1.07% to save	Juninho Bill; 3.94% to save	Gui Vieira; 13.94% to save	Yuri Bonotto; 18.58% to save	Sidney Sampaio; 20.04% to save	Sacha Bali; 42.43% to save	
4	11	12 (Day 81)	Rodrigo Phavanello; 1.53% to save	Sabrina Paiva; 5.98% to save	Hariany Almeida; Most votes to save		Lucas Viana; Most votes to save		
5	17	13 (Day 92)	Kathy Maravilha; 1.59% to save		Walério Araújo; 2.68% to save	Luiz Mesquita; 3.36% to save	Fabiano Moraes; 3.94% to save	Dudu Camargo; 88.43% to save	
6	13	13 (Day 92)	Dynho Alves; 1.89% to save	Sthe Matos; 10.45% to save	Rico Melquiades; Most votes to save		Solange Gomes; Most votes to save		
7	15	13 (Day 93)	Lily Nobre; 0.78% to save	Tonzão Chagas; 2.15% to save	WL Guimarães; 5.47% to save	Marcia Fu; 13.32% to save	André Gonçalves; 23.80% to save	Jaquelline Grohalski; 54.48% to save	
8	17	13 (Day 93)	Walério Araújo; 2.28% to save	Luiz Mesquita; 2.55% to save	Fabiano Moraes; 3.55% to save	Duda Wendling; 8.66% to save	Saory Cardoso; 19.63% to save	Dudu Camargo; 63.33% to save	
9	17	13 (Day 93)	Walério Araújo; 2.28% to save	Luiz Mesquita; 2.55% to save	Fabiano Moraes; 3.55% to save	Duda Wendling; 8.66% to save	Saory Cardoso; 19.63% to save	Dudu Camargo; 63.33% to save	
10	14	13 (Day 92)	André Marinho; 3.49% to save		Bárbara Borges; Most votes to save		Bia Miranda; Most votes to save	Iran Malfitano; Most votes to save	

=== Highest number of eviction nominations ===
#	Nominated	Season	Contestant	Ref.
1	8 times	1	Dado Dolabella; Winner - 1st Place	
1	8 times	16	Sacha Bali; Winner - 1st Place	
3	7 times	6	Denise Rocha; Runner-up - 2nd Place	
4	6 times	1	Danni Carlos; Runner-up - 2nd Place	
4	6 times	2	Karina Bacchi; Winner - 1st Place	
4	6 times	4	Monique Evans; Runner-up - 2nd Place	
4	6 times	12	Jojo Todynho; Winner - 1st Place	
4	6 times	13	Solange Gomes; Finalist - 3rd Place	
4	6 times	17	Fabiano Moraes; Finalist - 4th Place	

=== Highest percentages to win ===
#	Season	Winner	Ref.
1	5	Viviane Araújo; 84% (out of 3) to win	
2	1	Dado Dolabella; 83% (out of 2) to win	
3	13	Rico Melquiades; 77.47% (out of 3) to win	
4	17	Dudu Camargo; 75.88% (out of 4) to win	
5	10	Rafael Ilha; 62.51% (out of 3) to win	
6	14	Bárbara Borges; 61.14% (out of 3) to win	
7	11	Lucas Viana; 59.17% (out of 3) to win	
8	9	Flávia Viana; 56.37% (out of 3) to win	
9	15	Jaquelline Grohalski; 56.17% (out of 3) to win	
10	2	Karina Bacchi; 56% (out of 2) to win	

== Ratings and reception ==
Season	Timeslot (BRT)	Premiered		Ended		TV season	SP viewers (in points)	Source
Season	Timeslot (BRT)	Date	Viewers (in points)	Date	Viewers (in points)	TV season	SP viewers (in points)	Source
1	Everyday 9:30 pm	May 31, 2009	16	August 23, 2009	21	2009–10	13	
2	Everyday 9:30 pm	November 15, 2009	19	February 10, 2010	19	2009–10	9	
3	Everyday 11:15 pm	September 28, 2010	20	December 21, 2010	17	2010–11	15	
4	Everyday 11:15 pm	July 19, 2011	16	October 12, 2011	15	2011–12	11	
5	Everyday 10:30 pm	May 29, 2012	17	August 29, 2012	18	2012–13	11	
6	Everyday 11:15 pm	June 23, 2013	16	September 29, 2013	12	2013–14	9	
7	Everyday 10:30 pm	September 14, 2014	12	December 10, 2014	11	2014–15	9	
8	Everyday 10:30 pm	September 23, 2015	13	December 8, 2015	10	2015–16	9	
9	Everyday 10:30 pm	September 12, 2017	10	December 7, 2017	12	2017–18	9	
10	Everyday 10:45 pm	September 18, 2018	9.8	December 13, 2018	13.2	2018–19	11	
11	Everyday 10:45 pm	September 17, 2019	9.7	December 12, 2019	9	2019–20	8	
12	Everyday 10:45 pm	September 8, 2020	13.6	December 17, 2020	18.3	2019–20	13	
13	Everyday 10:45 pm	September 14, 2021	12	December 16, 2021	12.5	2020–21	9	
14	Everyday 11:00 pm	September 13, 2022	8.5	December 15, 2022	9.7	2021–22	7	
15	Everyday 11:00 pm	September 19, 2023	5.3	December 21, 2023	8.5	2022–23	6	
16	Everyday 10:30 pm	September 16, 2024	6.8	December 19, 2024	7.4	2023–24	6	
17	Everyday 10:30 pm	September 15, 2025	5.9	December, 2025		2024–25		

- Each point represents a specific number of households in São Paulo.
  - 2009: 55.000 households.
  - 2010: 55.000 households.
  - 2011: 58.000 households.
  - 2012: 60.000 households.
  - 2013: 62.000 households.
  - 2014: 65.000 households.
  - 2015: 67.000 households.
  - 2017: 70.500 households.
  - 2018: 71.855 households.
  - 2019: 73.015 households.
  - 2020: 74.987 households.
  - 2021: 76.577 households.
  - 2022: 74.666 households.
  - 2023: 76.953 households.
  - 2024: 73.279 households.
