= Miro Moreira =

Brazilian model

- Born: Waldomiro da Cruz Moreira Júnior; April 6, 1984 (age 42); São Paulo, Brazil
- Occupations: model, actor, director of photography
- Spouse: Liliane Lima
- Children: 1

Waldomiro da Cruz Moreira Júnior (born April 6, 1984), known as Miro Moreira, is a Brazilian male model, actor and director of photography.

== Biography ==
Moreira was born in São Paulo. According to him, when he was a teenager he was like the "ugly ducking" because he was skinny, used braces and had a lot of pimples.

At first he worked in a bank, but after his workmates encouraged him to pursue the modeling career, he quit the job. He started modeling on the catwalks at São Paulo Fashion Week. He has since modeled for Giorgio Armani, Armani Exchange, D&G, Belstaff, Lebole, Sean John, Roberto Cavalli, Dudalina, Aramis, Blue Man, among others. He was also on the cover of L'officiel, one of the most famous fashion magazines in Europe.

In Brazil, he got widespread attention for making a shoot for Brazilian site "Terra" and for participating in the reality show A Fazenda, the Brazilian version of The Farm.
