= Danni Carlos =

- Born: Daniela Carlos de Araújo; July 2, 1975 (age 51); Rio de Janeiro, Brazil
- Genres: Pop, blues-rock, acoustic, alternative rock
- Occupations: Singer, songwriter, composer, musician
- Years active: 2003 – present
- Label: Sony Music

Daniela Carlos de Araújo (born July 2, 1975 in Rio de Janeiro, Brazil) is a Brazilian singer, songwriter, composer, and musician.

== Discography ==
=== Albums ===
Year	Album	Formats	Sales	Label
2003	Rock'n'Road	CD	130,000	Sony BMG
2004	Rock'n'Road Again	CD	100,000	Sony BMG
2005	Rock'n'Road All Night	CD	80,000	Sony BMG
2005	Ao Vivo	CD, DVD	50,000	Sony BMG
2006	Rock'n'Road Movies	CD	40,000	Sony BMG
2007	Música Nova	CD	150,000	Sony BMG
2013	Livre	CD	1,000	Independent

=== Soundtracks ===
Year	Song	Album
2004	"Não Leve a Mal (Don't Get Me Wrong)" ^{Júlia's theme (Giselle Itié)}	Começar de Novo
2007	"Coisas Que Eu Sei" ^{Júlia's theme (Débora Falabella)}	Duas Caras
2008	"Coisas Que Eu Sei"	Mulher 2

=== Singles ===
Year	Single	BRA	Album
2004	"Não Leve a Mal (Don't Get Me Wrong)"	56	Começar de Novo: Nacional
2007	"Coisas Que Eu Sei"	1	Música Nova
2008	"Doce Sal"	12	Música Nova
2008	"Gelo e Rocha"	26	Música Nova
2009	"High and Dry"	—	Quanto Dura o Amor?
2013	"Eu Amo Você"	—	Livre
2013	"Navio"	—	Livre

=== Television ===
- 2009 – A Fazenda .... Herself
- 2006 – Cidadão Brasileiro .... Renée Girard
- 2005 – Quem Vai Ficar com Mário? .... Karla Frida
- 2005 – Carga Pesada
- 2003 – Agora É Que São Elas .... Neném

=== Filmography ===
- 2009 – A Mulher Invisível ... Bárbara
- 2009 – Quanto Dura o Amor ... Justine

=== Awards ===
Latin Grammy Awards of 2008

- 2008: Best Contemporary Brazilian Album- "Música Nova"
- 2008: Best Brazilian Song – "Coisas Que Eu Sei" (de Dudu Falcão)
