= Iúna =

- Municipality
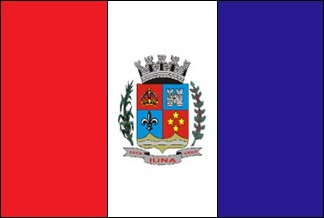
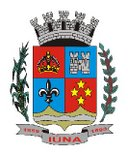
- Flag Coat of arms

- Location within Brazil
- Coordinates: 20°20′45″S 41°32′09″W
- Country: Brazil
- State: Espírito Santo
- Established: 11 November 1890

Area
  - Total: 461 km^{2} (178 sq mi)
- Elevation: 670 m (2,200 ft)

Population (2020)
  - Total: 29,290
  - Summer (DST): UTC−3 (BRT)

Iúna is a municipality located in the Brazilian state of Espírito Santo. Its population was 29,290 (2020) and its area is 461 km^{2} (178 sq mi).
