= Sacha Bali =

Brazilian actor, author, and theater producer

- Born: Sacha Bali de Alencar Szerman; 29 May 1981 (age 45); Rio de Janeiro, Rio de Janeiro, Brazil
- Occupation: actor
- Years active: 2004–present

Sacha Bali de Alencar Szerman (born May 29, 1981) is a Brazilian actor, author, theater producer and theater director.

Beginning his career in 2004, Bali initially worked behind the camera at Rede Globo, transitioning to acting with his debut in the play Lado B and the series Filhos do Carnaval. He has had roles in several series and soap operas such as Caminhos do Coração, Os Mutantes, Promessas de Amor, Vidas em Jogo, and Salve Jorge. Bali also contributed as a playwright and producer in theater productions like Os Pássaros and Pão com Mortadela. He created his first short film Vazio in 2015 and played a leading role in the series 1 Contra Todos. In recent years, Bali has acted in soap operas O Rico e O Lázaro and Jesus.

== Biography ==
Bali was born in the city of Rio de Janeiro. In 2004, while attending film school, he worked as a camera operator at Rede Globo filming reports for RJTV, Globo Repórter, Jornal Nacional and Fantástico. When he graduated in 2005, the network offered Sacha a contract to continue working behind the scenes, but he refused, aiming to focus his career as an actor, debuting in the play Lado B, which he also directed, wrote and produced. His debut was in the same year, making a special appearance in the series Filhos do Carnaval, in the last episode of the first season playing the young version of the character Gebarão. in 2006 Bali made a special appearance in the series Avassaladoras, besides acting in the play Escravas do Amor. And his debut in soap operas was in Bicho do Mato as Carlos, a greedy student who is involved in the illegal exploitation of diamonds. In 2007 he starred in the plays Os Pássaros, in which he was also an author, and Pão com Mortadela, in which he was also an author and producer.

Also In 2007, Bali stood out as an antagonist in telenovela Caminhos do Coração as mutant Metamorfo, with the ability to transform his body to the point of becoming anyone else. He continued his role in 2008 in Os Mutantes and in 2009 in Promessas de Amor. In 2010 he acted in the soap opera Poder Paralelo playing the ex-convict Artur who tries to start over after five years in prison. he also starred in the play As Próximas Horas Serão Definitivas together with actress Guta Stresser. In 2011, Bali acted in the soap opera Vidas em Jogo as one of the protagonists of the plot of a multimillion-dollar prize. In 2012 Sacha did not renew his contract with Record and went to Globo where he got a role in Salve Jorge playing Morena' ex-boyfriend, Beto. He also acted in the movie Paraísos Artificiais.

In 2013, Sacha realizes an audition in Jóia Rara to play Viktor, Franz's younger brother, however Sacha was older than Bruno, and ended up losing the role to Rafael Cardoso, but he was invited to a special appearance as Eurico, engaged to the protagonist, who dies in the first chapters. In 2014 Bali played Murilo in Em Família, a boy from the suburb who dates a rich girl and faces prejudices because of that. In 2015 Sacha wrote, produced and starred in the play Cachorro Quente. In same year he launched his first short movie Vazio. In 2016, Sacha acted in the film Em Nome da Lei as the cop Hulk. Bali also signed with FOX channel and wins its first protagonist in 1 Contra Todos. And in addition he also played the biker villain Dinho in series A Garota da Moto, produced by FOX in partnership with broadcaster SBT.

In 2017, Bali returned to Record and acted in the soap opera O Rico e O Lázaro. In 2018, he acted in the soap opera Jesus, playing Longinus, a Roman soldier serving at Pilate's court in Jerusalem.

In 2024, Sasha participated in the reality show A Fazenda and was crowned the winner of the edition with 50.93% of the votes, winning the prize of 2 million reais.

== Filmography ==
Television
Year	Title	Character	Notes
2005	Filhos do Carnaval	young Gebarão	Episode: Elefante, O Bicho Que Não Esquece"
2006	Avassaladoras	Tibério	Episode: O Sexo e a Idade
2006	Bicho do Mato	Carlos	
2007	Caminhos do Coração	Mateus Morpheus Mayer "Metamorfo"	
2008	Os Mutantes: Caminhos do Coração	Mateus Morpheus Mayer "Metamorfo"	
2009	Promessas de Amor	Mateus Morpheus Mayer "Metamorfo"	
2010	Poder Paralelo	Arthur	
2011	Vidas em Jogo	Jorge	
2012	Salve Jorge	Roberto do Nascimento "Beto"	
2012	Mandrake	Sebastião	Episodes: Robin Hood de Copacabana & A Investigação
2013	Jóia Rara	Eurico Passos	Episode: September 16, 2013
2013	José do Egito	Osiris	Participation in the penultimate episode as a hallucination of Pentephres.
2014	Em Família	Murilo Marques	
2016	A Garota da Moto	Bernardo Silva "Dinho"	
2017	O Rico e O Lázaro	Misael / Mesaque	
2018	Jesus	Longinus	
2020	Bom Dia, Verônica	Gregório	2 episodes
2020	Gênesis	Atarum	
2024	A Fazenda	Himself (Winner)	Season 16

Films
Year	Title	Character	Notes
2012	Paraísos Artíficiais	Pierre	
2015	Vazio	driver	Short film
2016	Em Nome da Lei	Hulk	
2016	Veneno	Hugo	Short film

Theater
Year	Title	Character	Notes
2005	Lado B	Arnaldo	Author, producer and director
2006	Escravas do Amor	João	
2007	Os Pássaros	Urubu	Actor and author
2007	Pão com Mortadela	Henry Chinaski	Actor, author and producer
2011	As Próximas Horas Serão Definitivas	Gabriel	Actor and producer
2015	Cachorro Quente	Luca Mastroianni	Actor, author and producer
2017	Uísque com Água		Author, director and producer
