= Are You the One? Brasil =

- Genre: Reality competition; Dating show
- Presented by: Felipe Titto; Caio Castro
- Opening theme: "Smooth Hand" by Heavy Young Heathens
- Country of origin: Brazil
- Original language: Portuguese
- No. of seasons: 4
- No. of episodes: 42

Production
- Running time: 60 minutes (including commercials)
- Production company: Floresta Produções

Original release
- Network: MTV Brasil
- Release: February 1, 2015 – April 26, 2018

Related
- Are You the One?; Are You the One? El Match Perfecto

Are You the One? Brasil is a Brazilian reality television series on MTV Brasil. It is a Brazilian version of the original American series. It follows 20 people who are living together in a tropical destination to find their perfect match. If the 10 men and 10 women are able to correctly choose all ten perfect matches in ten weeks, they will win R$500 thousand to split among them. Each episode the cast will pair up with whoever they believe their perfect match is to compete in a challenge. The winners of the challenge will go on a date, and have a chance to test their match in the truth booth. The cast members will choose one of the winning couples to go to the truth booth to determine if they are a perfect match or not. This is the only way to confirm matches. Each episode ends with a matching ceremony where the couples will be told how many perfect matches they have, but not which matches are correct. It debuted in February 2015 on MTV Brasil.

== Series overview ==
Season	Episodes	Originally released		Cast members	All Perfect Matches Found?	Total Money Won
Season	Episodes	First released	Last released	Cast members	All Perfect Matches Found?	Total Money Won
1	11	February 1, 2015	April 26, 2015	20	✓	R$500.000
2	11	January 17, 2016	April 3, 2016	21	✓	R$500.000
3	10	January 29, 2017	April 9, 2017	21	✓	R$500.000
4	10	February 22, 2018	April 26, 2018	21	✓	R$500.000

== Season 1 ==
Filmed in Rio de Janeiro, season one premiered on February 1, 2015.

=== Cast ===
Guys
Cast member	Age	Hometown
Caio Carvalho	26	Borda da Mata, Minas Gerais
Gabriel Assef	27	Rio de Janeiro, RJ
Guilherme Cal	26	Manaus, Amazonas
Henrique Tristão	28	Rio de Janeiro, RJ
Igor Freitas	24	São João Nepomuceno, Minas Gerais
Lucas Hoeffel	27	New York, NY
Marco Aurélio	28	São Paulo, SP
Saulo Leitte	25	Rio de Janeiro, RJ
Theo Fontes	29	São Paulo, SP
Thiago Catena	27	São Paulo, SP

Girls
Cast Member	Age	Hometown
Ana Clara Paim	19	Goiânia, Goiás
Ana Paula Azambuja	24	São Paulo, SP
Bárbara Tovar	24	Niterói, Rio de Janeiro
Gabriela Mendes	23	São Paulo, SP
Jéssica Waldow	26	Santo Ângelo, Rio Grande do Sul
Keroline Tu	26	São Carlos, SP
Larissa Mattes	21	São Paulo, SP
Luiza Aragão	26	Brasília, DF
Marianna del Rio	24	Rio de Janeiro, RJ
Natasha Barreto	26	Rio de Janeiro, RJ

=== Progress ===
Guys	Week								
Guys	1	2	3	4	5/6	7	8	9	10
Caio	Keroline	Marianna	Ana Clara	Ana Paula	Ana Clara	Ana Clara	Keroline	—N/a	Keroline
Gabriel	Ana Paula	Gabriela	Marianna	Natasha	Marianna	Marianna	Larissa	—N/a	Marianna
Guilherme	Bárbara	Larissa	Bárbara	Bárbara	Larissa	Natasha	Natasha	—N/a	Larissa
Henrique	Natasha	Natasha	Gabriela	Gabriela	Gabriela	Gabriela	Gabriela	—N/a	Gabriela
Igor	Marianna	Ana Clara	Ana Paula	Keroline	Natasha	Larissa	Ana Clara	—N/a	Luiza
Lucas	Luiza	Jéssica	Jéssica	Jéssica	Bárbara	Keroline	Bárbara	—N/a	Jéssica
Marco	Gabriela	Ana Paula	Luiza	Ana Clara	Luiza	Luiza	Luiza	—N/a	Ana Clara
Saulo	Larissa	Luiza	Natasha	Luiza	Keroline	Bárbara	Jéssica	—N/a	Bárbara
Theo	Ana Clara	Bárbara	Larissa	Larissa	Ana Paula	Ana Paula	Ana Paula	—N/a	Ana Paula
Thiago	Jéssica	Keroline	Keroline	Marianna	Jéssica	Jéssica	Marianna	—N/a	Natasha
Correct matches	1	2	3	3	4	4	3	No ceremony	10

Girls	Week								
Girls	1	2	3	4	5/6	7	8	9	10
Ana Clara	Theo	Igor	Caio	Marco	Caio	Caio	Igor	—N/a	Marco
Ana Paula	Gabriel	Marco	Igor	Caio	Theo	Theo	Theo	—N/a	Theo
Bárbara	Guilherme	Theo	Guilherme	Guilherme	Lucas	Saulo	Lucas	—N/a	Saulo
Gabriela	Marco	Gabriel	Henrique	Henrique	Henrique	Henrique	Henrique	—N/a	Henrique
Jéssica	Thiago	Lucas	Lucas	Lucas	Thiago	Thiago	Saulo	—N/a	Lucas
Keroline	Caio	Thiago	Thiago	Igor	Saulo	Lucas	Caio	—N/a	Caio
Larissa	Saulo	Guilherme	Theo	Theo	Guilherme	Igor	Gabriel	—N/a	Guilherme
Luiza	Lucas	Saulo	Marco	Saulo	Marco	Marco	Marco	—N/a	Igor
Marianna	Igor	Caio	Gabriel	Thiago	Gabriel	Gabriel	Thiago	—N/a	Gabriel
Natasha	Henrique	Henrique	Saulo	Gabriel	Igor	Guilherme	Guilherme	—N/a	Thiago
Correct matches	1	2	3	3	4	4	3	No ceremony	10

Notes

- Name Unconfirmed perfect match
- Name Confirmed perfect match

Once the truth booths confirms a perfect match, that couple will go to the honeymoon suite and will automatically paired up for the remainder of the match ceremonies.

=== Truth Booths ===
Couple	Episode	Result
Gabriel & Keroline	1	Not A Match
Igor & Marianna	2	Not A Match
Henrique & Gabriela	3	Perfect Match
Caio & Marianna	4	Not A Match
Guilherme & Bárbara	5/6	Not A Match
Igor & Natasha	7	Not A Match
Caio & Keroline	8	Perfect Match
Saulo & Bárbara	9	Perfect Match
Theo & Ana Paula	10	Perfect Match

== Season 2 ==
Filmed in Rio de Janeiro, season 2 premiered on January 17, 2016.

=== Cast ===
Guys
Cast member	Age	Hometown
Alex Ganacevich	26	São Paulo, SP
André Coelho	28	Brasília, DF
Felipe Garone	25	São Paulo, SP
Felipe Laport	27	Rio de Janeiro, RJ
Franco Gottardini	24	Mendoza, Argentina
Paulo Roberto	27	Belo Horizonte, Minas Gerais
Rafael Gotlib	22	Rio de Janeiro, RJ
Raoni Silva	26	Rio de Janeiro, RJ
Tairo Lima	26	Salvador, Bahia
Thaigo Consani	26	São Caetano do Sul, SP

Girls
Cast member	Age	Hometown
Alice Hellmann	24	Campo Grande, MS
Anna Naylor	20	Rio de Janeiro, RJ
Bárbara Abreu	22	Jundiaí, São Paulo
Cindy Campos	23	São Paulo, SP
Elisabetta Pitrez	19	Brasília, DF
Fernanda Napoleão	27	Florianópolis, Santa Catarina
Fernanda Raja	24	Florianópolis, Santa Catarina
Júlia Cortês	24	Niterói, Rio de Janeiro
Luana Nogueira	23	São Paulo, SP
Vanessa Aud	24	São Paulo, SP
Vanessa Thomé	26	Porto Alegre, Rio Grande do Sul

^{1} During Episode 6, it was found that Elisabetta was pregnant from a previous relationship. For this reason, she left the program and during the challenge Barbara was announced as a replacement.

=== Progress ===
Guys	Week									
Guys	1	2	3	4	5	6	7	8	9	10
Alex	Alice	Anna	Luana	Fernanda N.	Fernanda N.	Fernanda N.	Fernanda N.	Fernanda N.	Fernanda N.	Fernanda N.
André	Vanessa T.	Vanessa T.	Vanessa T.	Vanessa T.	Vanessa T.	Vanessa T.	Vanessa T.	Vanessa T.	Vanessa T.	Vanessa T.
Felipe G.	Júlia	Júlia	Alice	Fernanda R.	Luana	Luana	Luana	Cindy	Bárbara	Cindy
Felipe L.	Fernanda N.	Fernanda N.	Vanessa A.	Elisabetta	Elisabetta	Bárbara	Vanessa A.	Fernanda R.	Fernanda R.	Luana
Franco	Cindy	Cindy	Anna	Alice	Alice	Alice	Alice	Luana	Luana	Fernanda R.
Paulo	Vanessa A.	Vanessa A.	Cindy	Vanessa A.	Vanessa A.	Vanessa A.	Bárbara	Vanessa A.	Vanessa A.	Vanessa A.
Rafael	Luana	Luana	Fernanda N.	Anna	Anna	Cindy	Cindy	Anna	Anna	Anna
Raoni	Fernanda R.	Fernanda R.	Fernanda R.	Júlia	Júlia	Júlia	Júlia	Júlia	Júlia	Júlia
Tairo	Elisabetta	Elisabetta	Elisabetta	Cindy	Cindy	Anna	Anna	Alice	Alice	Alice
Thaigo	Anna	Alice	Júlia	Luana	Fernanda R.	Fernanda R.	Fernanda R.	Bárbara	Cindy	Bárbara
Correct matches	2	2	1	5	5	4	3	8	6	10

Girls	Week									
Girls	1	2	3	4	5	6	7	8	9	10
Alice	Alex	Thaigo	Felipe G.	Franco	Franco	Franco	Franco	Tairo	Tairo	Tairo
Anna	Thaigo	Alex	Franco	Rafael	Rafael	Tairo	Tairo	Rafael	Rafael	Rafael
Cindy	Franco	Franco	Paulo	Tairo	Tairo	Rafael	Rafael	Felipe G.	Thaigo	Felipe G.
Elisabetta/ Bárbara^{1}	Tairo	Tairo	Tairo	Felipe L.	Felipe L.	Felipe L.	Paulo	Thaigo	Felipe G.	Thaigo
Fernanda N.	Felipe L.	Felipe L.	Rafael	Alex	Alex	Alex	Alex	Alex	Alex	Alex
Fernanda Raja	Raoni	Raoni	Raoni	Felipe G.	Thaigo	Thaigo	Thaigo	Felipe L.	Felipe L.	Franco
Júlia	Felipe G.	Felipe G.	Thaigo	Raoni	Raoni	Raoni	Raoni	Raoni	Raoni	Raoni
Luana	Rafael	Rafael	Alex	Thaigo	Felipe G.	Felipe G.	Felipe G.	Franco	Franco	Felipe L.
Vanessa Aud	Paulo	Paulo	Felipe L.	Paulo	Paulo	Paulo	Felipe L.	Paulo	Paulo	Paulo
Vanessa T.	André	André	André	André	André	André	André	André	André	André
Correct matches	2	2	1	5	5	4	3	8	6	10

Notes

- Name Unconfirmed perfect match
- Name Confirmed perfect match

Once the truth booths confirms a perfect match, that couple will go to the honeymoon suite and will automatically paired up for the remainder of the match ceremonies.

=== Truth Booths ===
Couple	Episode	Result
Raoni & Vanessa A.	1	Not A Match
Alex & Alice	2	Not A Match
André & Vanessa T.	3	Perfect Match
Felipe G. & Júlia	4	Not A Match
Thaigo & Luana	5	Not A Match
Felipe L. & Bárbara	6	Not a Match
Alex & Fernanda N.	7	Perfect Match
Tairo & Cindy	8	Not a Match
Tairo & Alice	9	Perfect Match
Franco & Fernanda R.	10	Perfect Match

== Season 3 ==
Filmed in Trancoso, Bahia, Season three premiered on January 29, 2017.

=== Cast ===
Guys
Cast member	Age	Hometown
Allan Costa	29	Rio de Janeiro, RJ
Arthur Lemes		Piraju, São Paulo
Caique Mattos	23	São Paulo, SP
Felipe Marques	22	São Paulo, SP
Henrique Ciocchi	26	Salvador, Bahia
Lucian Miranda	27	Buenos Aires, Argentina
Luis Ado	30	Nova Trento, Santa Catarina
Rafael Fernandes	24	Rio de Janeiro, RJ
Ramon Dürr	26	Rio de Janeiro, RJ
Renan Prestes	26	Belo Horizonte, Minas Gerais
Thiago Madeira	31	Brasília, DF

Girls
Cast Member	Age	Hometown
Amanda Kimberlly	22	Quatiguá, Paraná
Ana Bárbara Lima	26	Belo Horizonte, Minas Gerais
Andressa Alves	22	Crisópolis, Bahia
Gabriela Bergantin	21	São Paulo, SP
Irina Gatsalova	33	Moscow, Russia
Isabella Motta	22	Salvador, Bahia
Jéssica Kuhn	25	Santo Ângelo, Rio Grande do Sul
Larissa Bernardini	20	Belo Horizonte, Minas Gerais
Laura Boson	27	Belo Horizonte, Minas Gerais
Mia Siqueira	22	Porto Alegre, Rio Grande do Sul

=== Progress ===
Guys	Week									
Guys	1	2	3	4	5	6	7	8	9	10
Allan	Andressa	Larissa	Andressa	Andressa	Andressa	Ana Bárbara	Ana Bárbara	Irina	—N/a	Irina
Caique	Mia	Mia	Mia	Mia	Mia	Mia	Mia	Mia	Mia	Mia
Felipe	Amanda	Gabriela	Ana Bárbara	Larissa	Isabella	Isabella	Andressa	Andressa	—N/a	Larissa
Henrique	Larissa	Amanda	Larissa	Jéssica	Jéssica	Gabriela	Amanda	Gabriela	—N/a	Gabriela
Lucian	Irina	Andressa	Irina	Isabella	Gabriela	Andressa	Gabriela	Laura	—N/a	Isabella
Luis	Laura	Jéssica	Gabriela	Amanda	Ana Bárbara	Amanda	Isabella	Amanda	—N/a	Andressa
Rafael	Gabriela	Ana Bárbara	Amanda	Irina	Larissa	Irina	Larissa	Isabella	—N/a	Ana Bárbara
Ramon	Isabella	Isabella	Isabella	Ana Bárbara	Laura	Laura	Laura	Ana Bárbara	—N/a	Laura
Renan	Jéssica	Irina	Jéssica	Laura	Irina	Jéssica	Jéssica	Jéssica	Jéssica	Jéssica
Thiago/Arthur	Ana Bárbara	Laura	Laura	Gabriela	Amanda	Larissa	Irina	Larissa	—N/a	Amanda
Correct matches	2	2	2	3	3	4	3	4	No ceremony	10

Girls	Week									
Girls	1	2	3	4	5	6	7	8	9	10
Amanda	Felipe	Henrique	Rafael	Luis	Arthur	Luis	Henrique	Luis	—N/a	Arthur
Andressa	Allan	Lucian	Allan	Allan	Allan	Lucian	Felipe	Felipe	—N/a	Luís
Ana Bárbara	Arthur	Rafael	Felipe	Ramon	Luis	Allan	Allan	Ramon	—N/a	Rafael
Gabriela	Rafael	Felipe	Luis	Arthur	Lucian	Henrique	Lucian	Henrique	—N/a	Henrique
Isabella	Ramon	Ramon	Ramon	Lucian	Felipe	Felipe	Luis	Rafael	—N/a	Lucian
Irina	Lucian	Renan	Lucian	Rafael	Renan	Rafael	Arthur	Allan	—N/a	Allan
Jéssica	Renan	Luis	Renan	Henrique	Henrique	Renan	Renan	Renan	Renan	Renan
Larissa	Henrique	Allan	Henrique	Felipe	Rafael	Arthur	Rafael	Arthur	—N/a	Felipe
Laura	Luis	Arthur	Arthur	Renan	Ramon	Ramon	Ramon	Lucian	—N/a	Ramon
Mia	Caique	Caique	Caique	Caique	Caique	Caique	Caique	Caique	Caique	Caique
Correct matches	2	2	2	3	3	4	3	4	No ceremony	10

Notes

- Name Unconfirmed perfect match
- Name Confirmed perfect match

Once the truth booths confirms a perfect match, that couple will go to the honeymoon suite and will automatically paired up for the remainder of the match ceremonies.

=== Truth Booths ===
Couple	Episode	Result
Caique & Larissa	1	Not A Match
Caique & Mia	2	Perfect Match
Luis & Laura	3	Not A Match
Felipe & Amanda	4	Not A Match
Ramon & Isabella	5	Not A Match
Allan & Andressa	6	Not A Match
Renan & Jéssica	7	Perfect Match
Lucian & Gabriela	8	Not A Match
Rafael & Laura	9	Not A Match
Lucian & Isabella	10	Perfect Match

== Season 4 ==
Filmed in Búzios, Rio de Janeiro. The new host is Caio Castro. This time, one girl has two matches which means that there will be eleven boys, but only ten girls.

=== Cast ===
Guys
Cast member	Age	Hometown
Fábio Croce	24	Bologna, Italy
Felipe Beribá	26	Salvador, Bahia
Gustavo Perpétuo	29	Teófilo Otoni, MG
Ian Turturro	24	Rio de Janeiro, RJ
Jonas Paiva	30	Belo Horizonte, MG
Lucas Vianna	26	Ipatinga, MG
Luis Copini	22	Santo André, SP
Paulo Passini	28	Rio de Janeiro, RJ
Vanderlei Nagô	27	Salvador, Bahia
Victor Moura	29	Vitória, ES
Wallyson Silva	24	Suzano, SP

Girls
Cast Member	Age	Hometown
Gabriela Boldrini	21	Vila Velha, ES
Gabriella Zuffo	22	São Paulo, SP
Juliana Gomes	22	Rio de Janeiro, RJ
Manuela Guglielmi	21	Criciúma, SC
Maria Eugênia Luz	22	São José do Rio Preto, SP
Natália Cavalcanti	22	Recife, PE
Natasha Pugliesi	20	Sorengo, Switzerland
Samanta Cordeiro	25	São Paulo, SP
Tuka Matos	21	Unaí, MG
Victória de Oliveira	20	Rio de Janeiro, RJ

=== Progress ===
Guys	Week									
Guys	1	2	3	4	5	6	7	8	9	10
Fabio	Tuka	—N/a	Manuela	Manuela	Manuela	San	—N/a	Victória	Natasha	Natália
Felipe	Natália	Tuka	Tuka	San	—N/a	M. Eugenia	Manuela	Manuela	Victória	Natasha
Gustavo	Gabi Z.	Victória	Victória	Victória	San	Gabi B.	San	Natália	San	San
Ian	Natasha	M. Eugenia	—N/a	M. Eugenia	M. Eugenia	Victória	M. Eugenia	M. Eugenia	M. Eugenia	M. Eugenia
Jonas	—N/a	Gabi B.	M. Eugenia	Gabi B.	Tuka	Tuka	Gabi Z.	Tuka	Natália	Gabi B.
Lucas/George	Manuela	Natália	Natália	Natasha	Victória	—N/a	Natália	Natasha	Juliana	Victória
Luis	M. Eugenia	Juliana	Gabi Z.	Juliana	Juliana	Manuela	Juliana	Juliana	Manuela	Gabi Z.
Nagô	San	Gabi Z.	Natasha	Gabi Z.	Natasha	Natasha	Natasha	—N/a	—N/a	Juliana
Paulo	Victória	Manuela	Juliana	—N/a	Gabi B.	Gabi Z.	Gabi B.	Gabi B.	Tuka	Tuka
Victor	Juliana	Natasha	Gabi B.	Natália	Natália	Natália	Victoria	Gabi Z.	Gabi B.	Manuela
Wallyson	Gabi B.	San	San	Tuka	Gabi Z.	Juliana	Tuka	San	Gabi Z.	Juliana
Correct matches	0	2	1	2	3	1	2	1	3	10

Girls	Week									
Girls	1	2	3	4	5	6	7	8	9	10
Gabi B.	Wallyson	Jonas	Victor	Jonas	Paulo	Gustavo	Paulo	Paulo	Victor	Jonas
Gabi Z.	Gustavo	Nagô	Luis	Nagô	Wallyson	Paulo	Jonas	Victor	Wallyson	Luis
Juliana	Victor	Luis	Paulo	Luis	Luis	Wallyson	Luis	Luis	George	Nagô & Wallyson
Manuela	Lucas	Paulo	Fabio	Fabio	Fabio	Luis	Felipe	Felipe	Luis	Victor
M. Eugenia	Luis	Ian	Jonas	Ian	Ian	Felipe	Ian	Ian	Ian	Ian
Natália	Felipe	Lucas	Lucas	Victor	Victor	Victor	George	Gustavo	Jonas	Fabio
Natasha	Ian	Victor	Nagô	Lucas	Nagô	Nagô	Nagô	George	Fabio	Felipe
San	Nagô	Wallyson	Wallyson	Felipe	Gustavo	Fabio	Gustavo	Wallyson	Gustavo	Gustavo
Tuka	Fabio	Felipe	Felipe	Wallyson	Jonas	Jonas	Wallyson	Jonas	Paulo	Paulo
Victória	Paulo	Gustavo	Gustavo	Gustavo	Lucas	Ian	Victor	Fabio	Felipe	George
Correct matches	0	2	1	2	3	1	2	1	3	10

Notes

- Name Unconfirmed perfect match
- Name Confirmed perfect match

Once the truth booth confirms a perfect match, that couple will go to the honeymoon suite and will automatically be paired up for the remainder of the match ceremonies.

=== Truth Booths ===
Couple	Episode	Result	Eleventh Guy
Felipe & Gabi B.	1	Not A Match	—N/a
Fábio & Maria Eugenia	2	Not A Match	—N/a
Victor & Natasha	3	Not A Match	—N/a
Paulo & Manuela	4	Not A Match	—N/a
Felipe & Tuka	5	Not A Match	—N/a
Ian & Manuela	6	Not A Match	—N/a
Fábio & Manuela	7	Not A Match	—N/a
Ian & Maria Eugênia	8	Perfect Match	Not A Match
Felipe & Juliana	9	Not A Match	Perfect Match
Nagô & Juliana	10	Perfect Match	Perfect Match
