= Itapecerica da Serra =

- Municipality
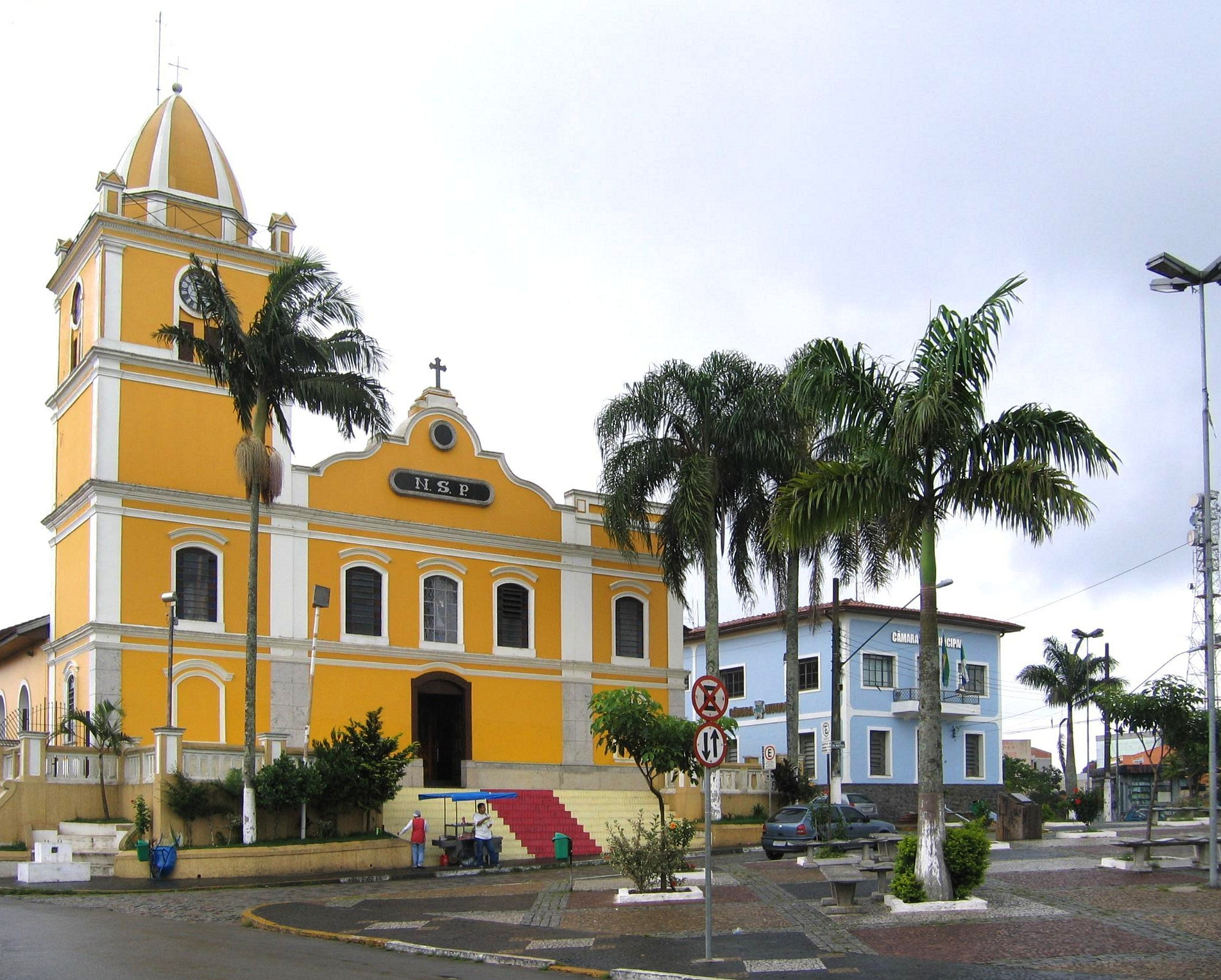

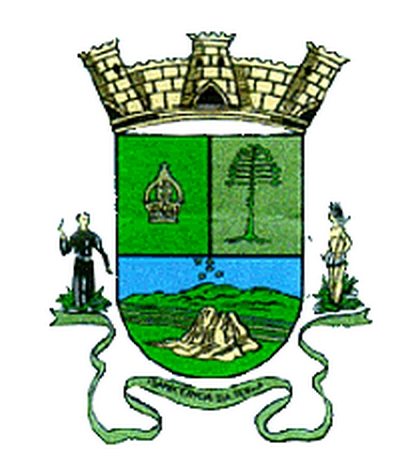
- Flag Coat of arms

- Location in São Paulo state

- Location in Brazil
- Coordinates: 23°43′2″S 46°50′58″W
- Country: Brazil
- Region: Southeast Brazil
- State: São Paulo
- Metropolitan Region: São Paulo

Area
  - Total: 150.74 km^{2} (58.20 sq mi)
- Elevation: 920 m (3,020 ft)

Population (2022 Census)
  - Total: 158,522
  - Estimate (2025): 163,003
  - Density: 1,051.6/km^{2} (2,723.7/sq mi)
- Time zone: UTC−3 (BRT)

Itapecerica da Serra (Portuguese pronunciation: [itapeˈsɛɾikɐ dɐ ˈsɛʁɐ]) is a municipality in the Brazilian state of São Paulo. It is part of the Metropolitan Region of São Paulo. The population is 158,522 (2022 Census) in an area of 150.74 km^{2} (58.20 sq mi). It is located 23 miles southwest of São Paulo and at an altitude of 920 m (3,020 ft) above sea level. The name Itapecerica is believed to come from the Tupi language for slippery stone, and da Serra means of the Mountains in Portuguese.

== History ==
Itapecerica da Serra was founded in 1562 by the Jesuit missionaries. It was one of several settlements Christianized indians, established around the Colégio de São Paulo de Piratininga (later to become the city of São Paulo) as a first line of defense against raids by hostile Indians. Besides the local inhabitants, the village incorporated natives from the village of Carapicuíba, brought by bandeirante Afonso Sardinha and priest Belchior Pontes.

== Media ==
In telecommunications, the city was served by Companhia Telefônica Brasileira until 1973, when it began to be served by Telecomunicações de São Paulo. In July 1998, this company was acquired by Telefónica, which adopted the Vivo brand in 2012.

The company is currently an operator of cell phones, fixed lines, internet (fiber optics/4G) and television (satellite and cable).

== See also ==
- List of municipalities in São Paulo
