= São João Nepomuceno =

Municipality in the southeast of Minas Gerais, Brazil

- Municipality
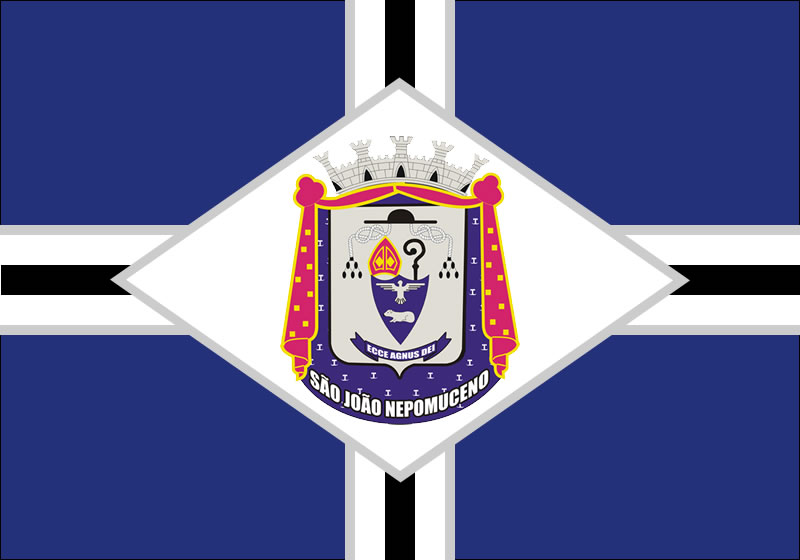
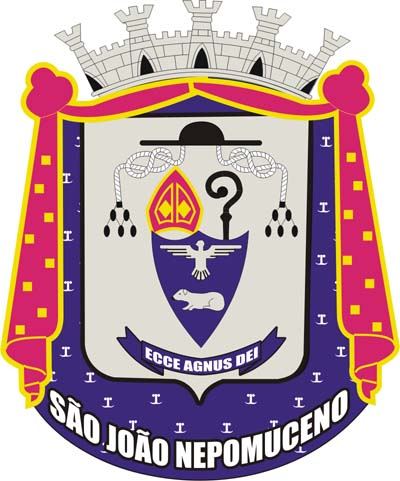
- Flag Coat of arms
- Nickname: SJN
- Location in Brazil

- Location within Brazil
- Coordinates: 21°32′24″S 43°00′39″W
- Country: Brazil
- Region: Southeast
- State: Minas Gerais
- Incorporated: May 16, 1880

Government
  - Mayor: Antônio José da Costa (2025-2028)

Area
  - Total: 407,896 km^{2} (157,490 sq mi)
- Elevation: 390 m (1,280 ft)

Population (2022)
  - Total: 25.565
  - Density: 62.75/km^{2} (162.5/sq mi)
- Time zone: UTC−3 (BRT)
- Website: São João Nepomuceno

São João Nepomuceno is a municipality in the southeast of Minas Gerais, Brazil close to the state border with Rio de Janeiro. The city is named after its patron saint, John of Nepomuk.

== See also ==
- List of municipalities in Minas Gerais
