= List of A Fazenda contestants =

This is a list of participants in A Fazenda (English: The Farm), a Brazilian television show in which celebrity contestants compete against each other to be the last farm resident and win the grand prize. The series first aired in May 2009, and 16 seasons have been filmed as of December 2024.

A total of 274 participants have competed, and 11 of them have competed in multiple seasons; actress Franciely Freduzeski (season 1), assistant referee Ana Paula Oliveira (season 2) and TV host Monique Evans (season 3), who were the first celebrities to be evicted in their respectives seasons, returned in Season 4 for another chance to win the grand prize. Style Consultant Fábio Arruda (season 1), dancer Adriana Bombom (season 2), footballer Dinei (season 4), TV Host Nicole Bahls (season 5), singer Rita Cadillac (season 6) and model Ana Paula Minerato (season 8) returned in Season 9 for a new chance, alongside other ten contestants of Brazilian reality shows. Businesswoman Nadja Pessoa (season 10) and entrepreneur Shayan Haghbin (season 14) returned in Season 15 for a new chance.

The youngest contestant was dancer Bia Miranda from season 14, who entered the farm at age 18. The oldest contestant was singer Nahim, from season 9, who entered the farm at age 65.

Some contestants have kinship with other ones: Andressa Oliveira (season 2) is ex-girlfriend of Théo Becker (season 1). Gui Pádua (season 4) is ex-boyfriend of Janaina Jacobina (season 3). From Season 6, Bárbara Evans is daughter of Monique Evans (seasons 3 and 4), Mateus Verdelho is ex-husband of Dani Bolina (season 4) and Márcio Duarte is Vavá's (season 5) twin brother. Mara Maravilha (season 8) is ex-girlfriend of Roy Rosselló (season 7), Aritana Maroni (season 9) is daughter of Oscar Maroni (season 7), Conrado (season 9) is husband of Andréia Sorvetão (season 7), Phellipe Haagensen (season 11) is Jonathan Haagensen's (season 1) younger brother, Mariano (season 12) is ex-boyfriend of Carla Prata (season 8) and Dynho Alves (season 13) is Mirella's (season 12) husband. From season 14, André Marinho is Drika Marinho's (season 11) husband, while Bia Miranda is Gretchen's (season 5) granddaughter. WL Guimarães (season 15) is ex-boyfriend of Ingrid Ohara (season 14), Lucas Souza is ex-husband of Jojo Todynho (season 12) and Jenny Miranda (season 15) is mother of Bia Miranda (season 14).

In sixteen seasons, the state of São Paulo has the largest number of contestants with 89 contestants. Followed by Rio de Janeiro with 78, Minas Gerais with 22, Rio Grande do Sul with eleven, Bahia, Goiás and Paraná with nine, Distrito Federal and Santa Catarina with eight, Pernambuco with seven, Espírito Santo with four, Alagoas with three, Acre, Ceará, Mato Grosso and Mato Grosso do Sul with two, and Amazonas, Maranhão, Pará, Paraíba, Rio Grande do Norte, Rondônia and Sergipe with only one. The states of Amapá, Piauí, Roraima and Tocantins never had representatives until the 16th edition. Only four contestants were born outside of Brazil: From season 4, the boxer Duda Yankovich was born in Jagodina, Yugoslavia (now Serbia), the musician and former Menudo Roy Rosselló, from season 7, was born in Río Piedras, in Puerto Rico, while actress Valentina Francavilla from season 13 was born in Rome, Italy and the entrepreneur Shayan Haghbin from seasons 14 & 15 is from Tehran, Iran.

Through telephone, Internet, and SMS text voting, viewers have chosen as winners actor Dado Dolabella, actress Karina Bacchi, model Daniel Bueno, personal trainer Joana Machado, actress Viviane Araújo, model Bárbara Evans, singer DH Silveira, actor Douglas Sampaio, actress Flávia Viana, singer Rafael Ilha, model Lucas Viana, singer Jojo Todynho, digital influencer Rico Melquiades, actress Bárbara Borges, model Jaquelline Grohalski and actor Sacha Bali.

== Contestants ==
Biographical information according to Record official series site, plus footnoted additions.
(ages stated are at time of contest)

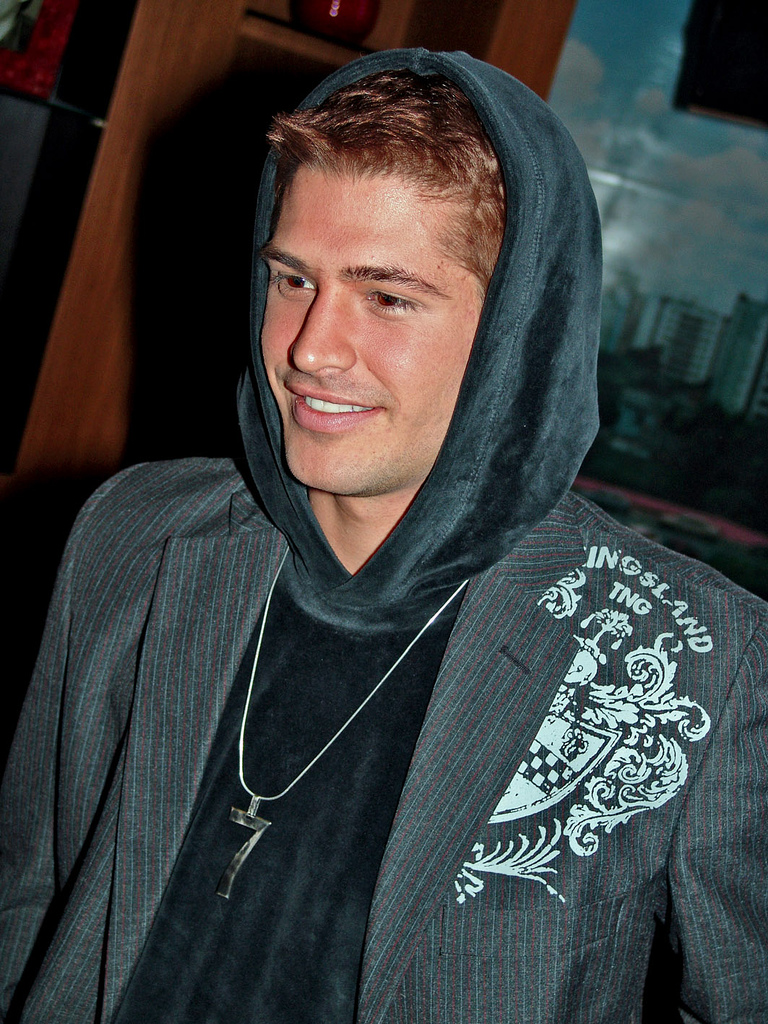
Dado Dolabella, Season 1 Champion

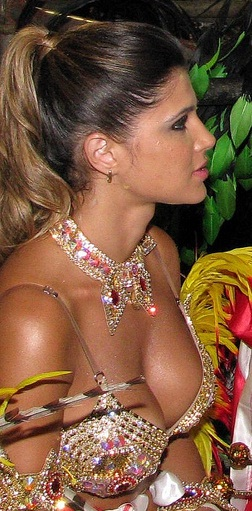
Danielle Souza, Season 1

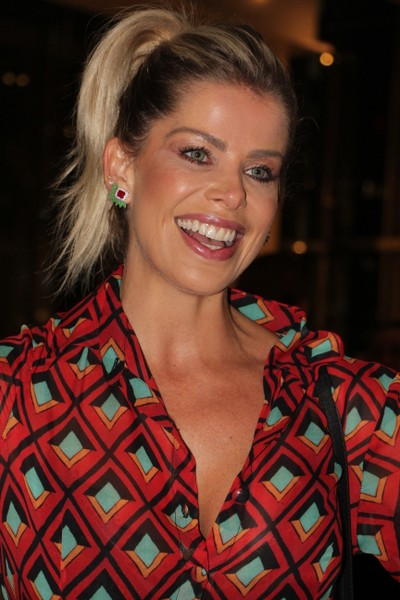
Karina Bacchi, Season 2 Champion

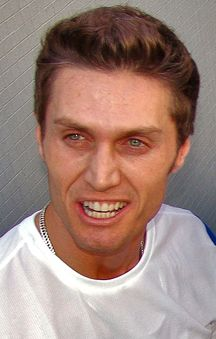
André Segatti, Season 2

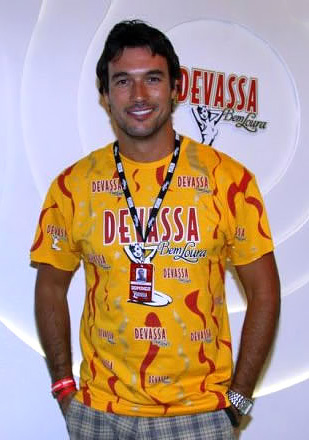
Daniel Bueno, Season 3 Champion

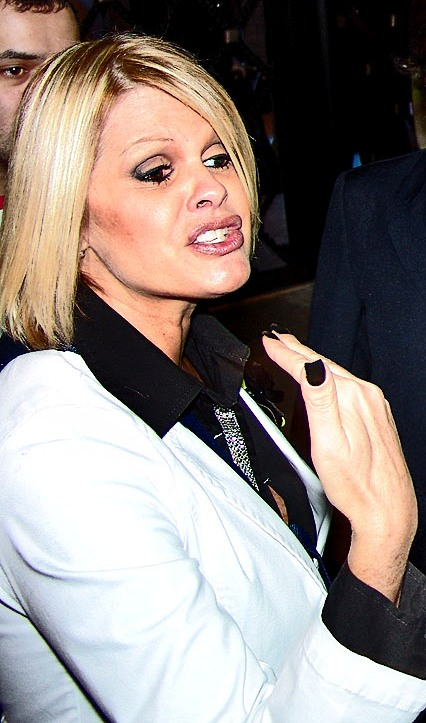
Monique Evans, Seasons 3 and 4

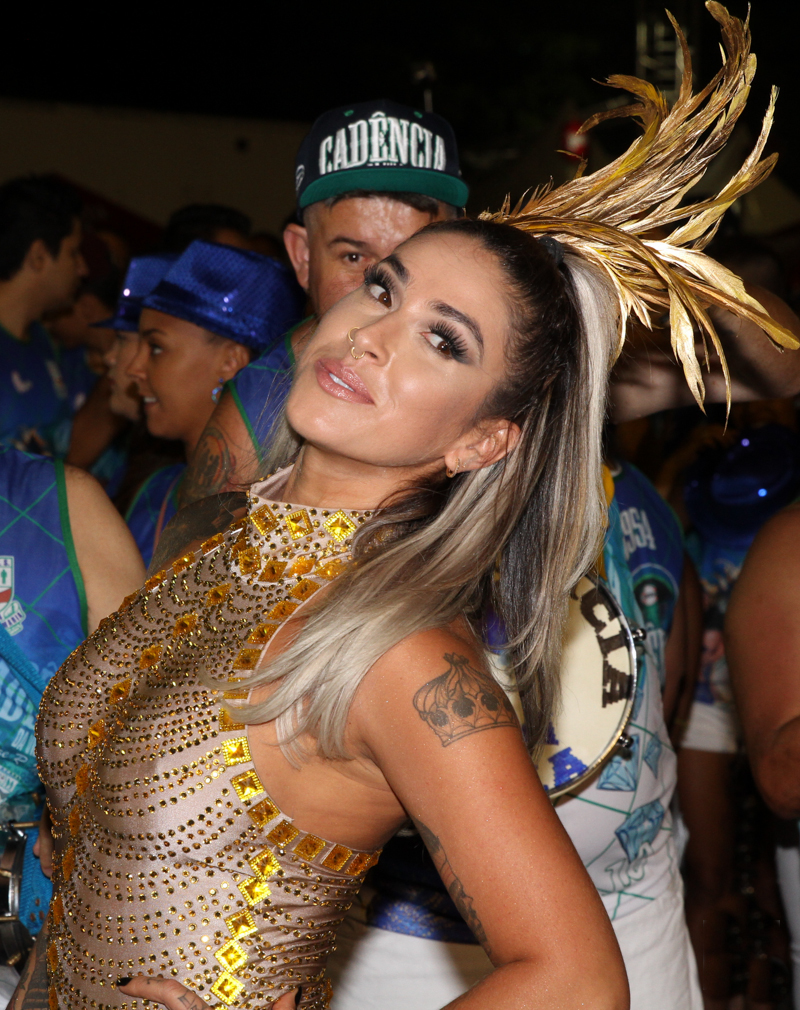
Dani Bolina, Season 4

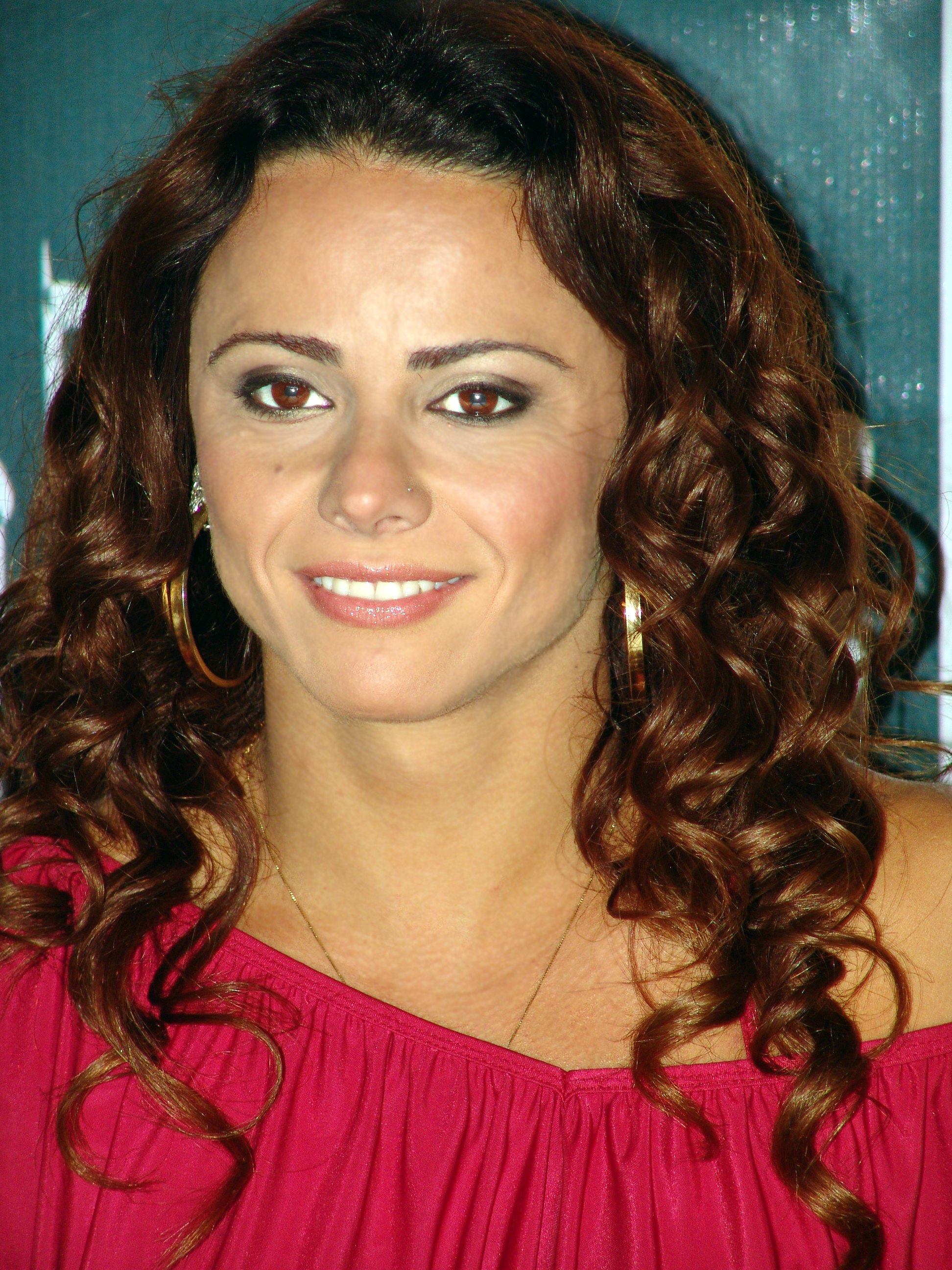
Viviane Araújo, Season 5 Champion

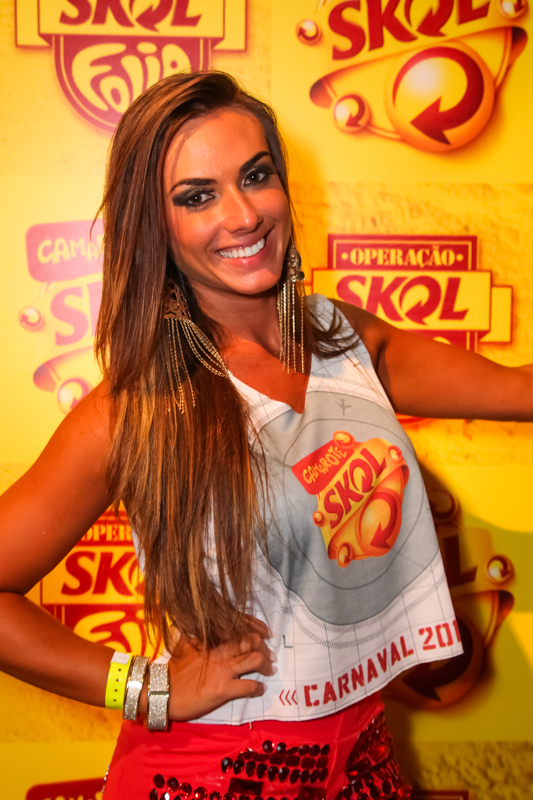
Nicole Bahls, Seasons 5 and 9

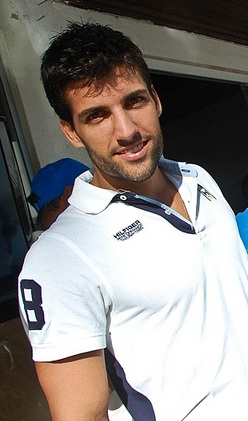
Diego Pombo, Season 5

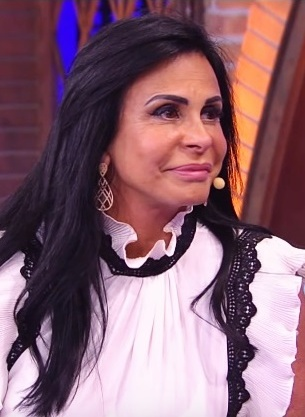
Gretchen, Season 5

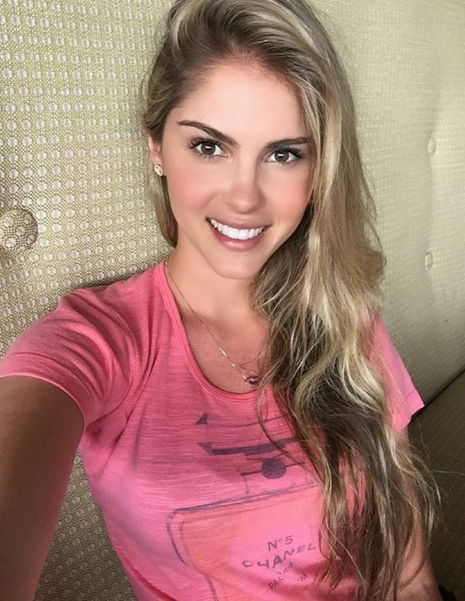
Bárbara Evans, Season 6 Champion

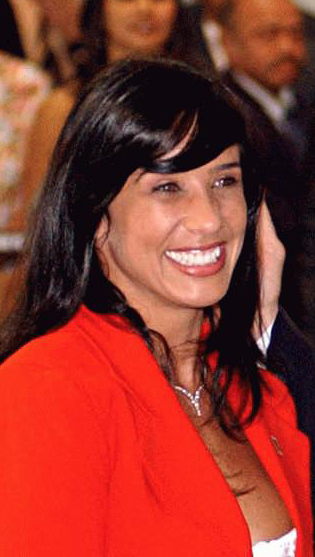
Scheila Carvalho, Season 6

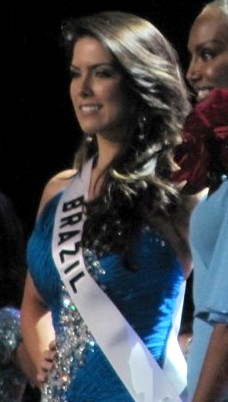
Débora Lyra, Season 7

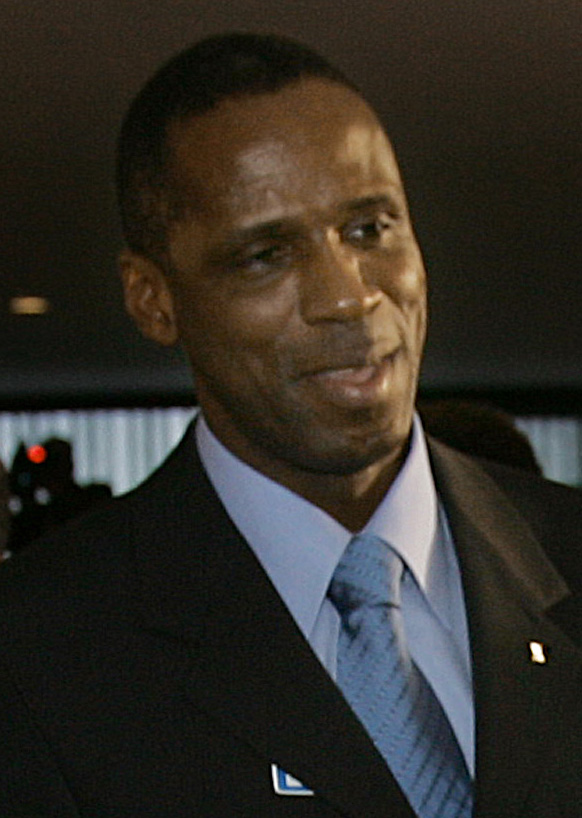
Robson Caetano, Season 7

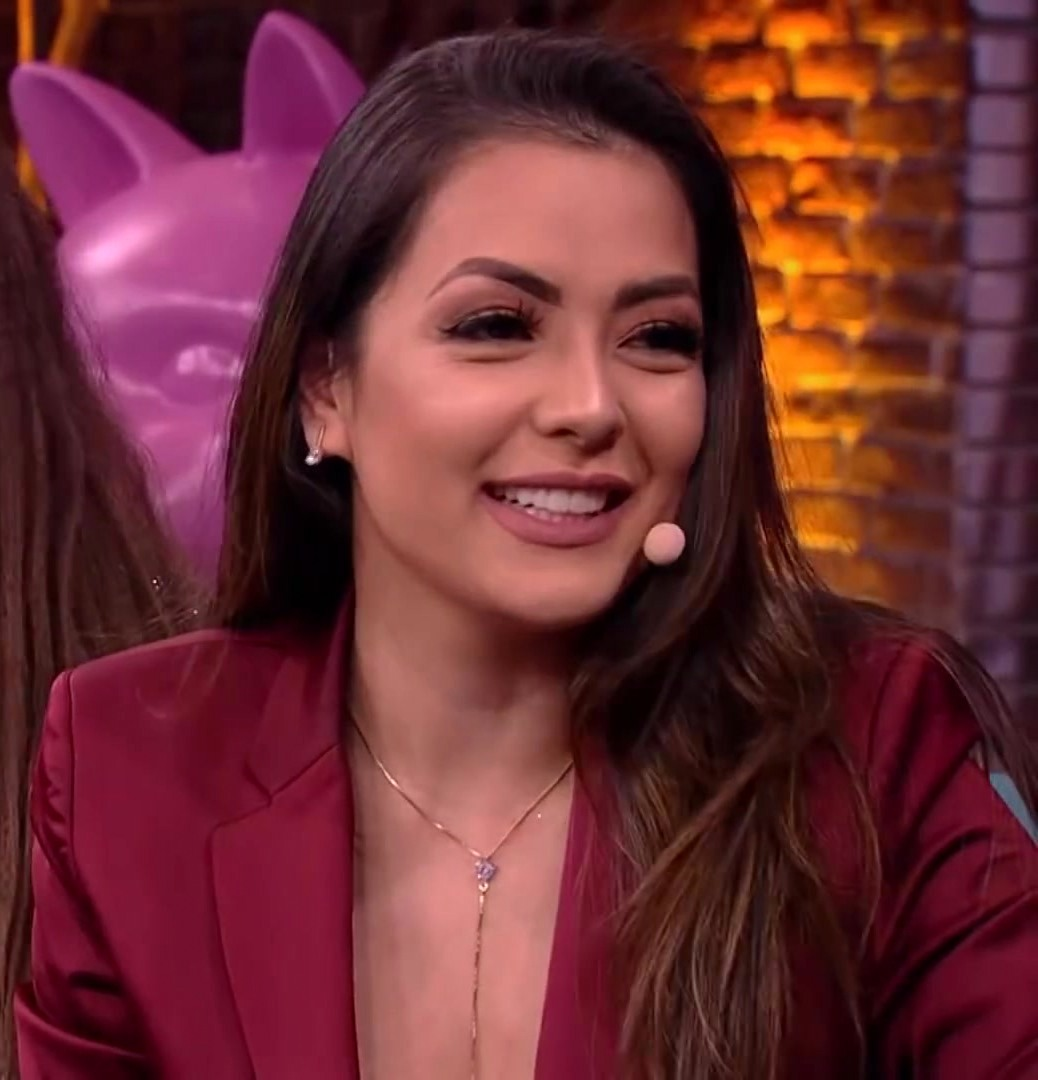
Li Martins, Season 8

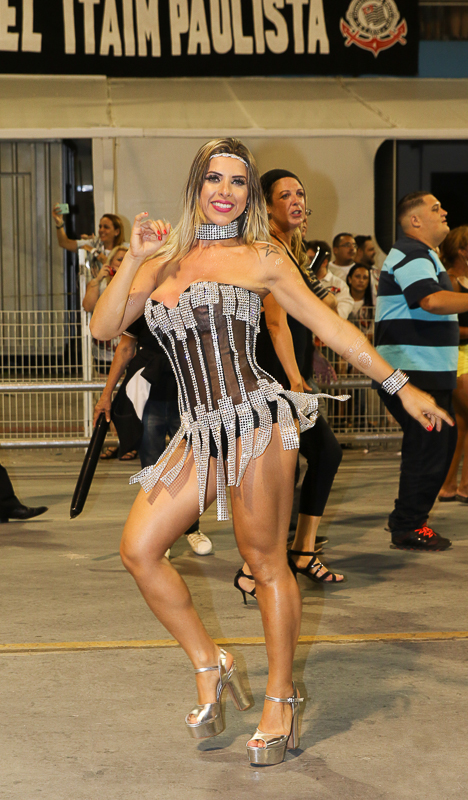
Ana Paula Minerato, Season 8 and 9

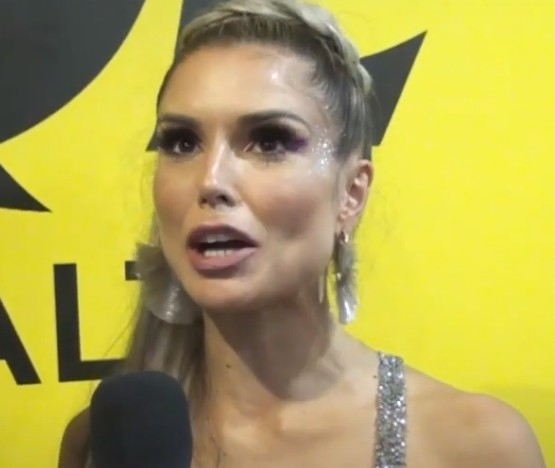
Flávia Viana, Season 9 Champion

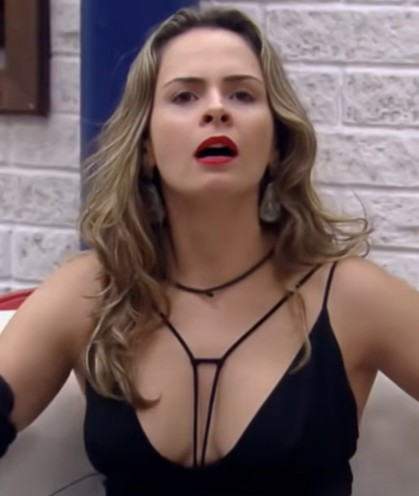
Ana Paula Renault, Season 10

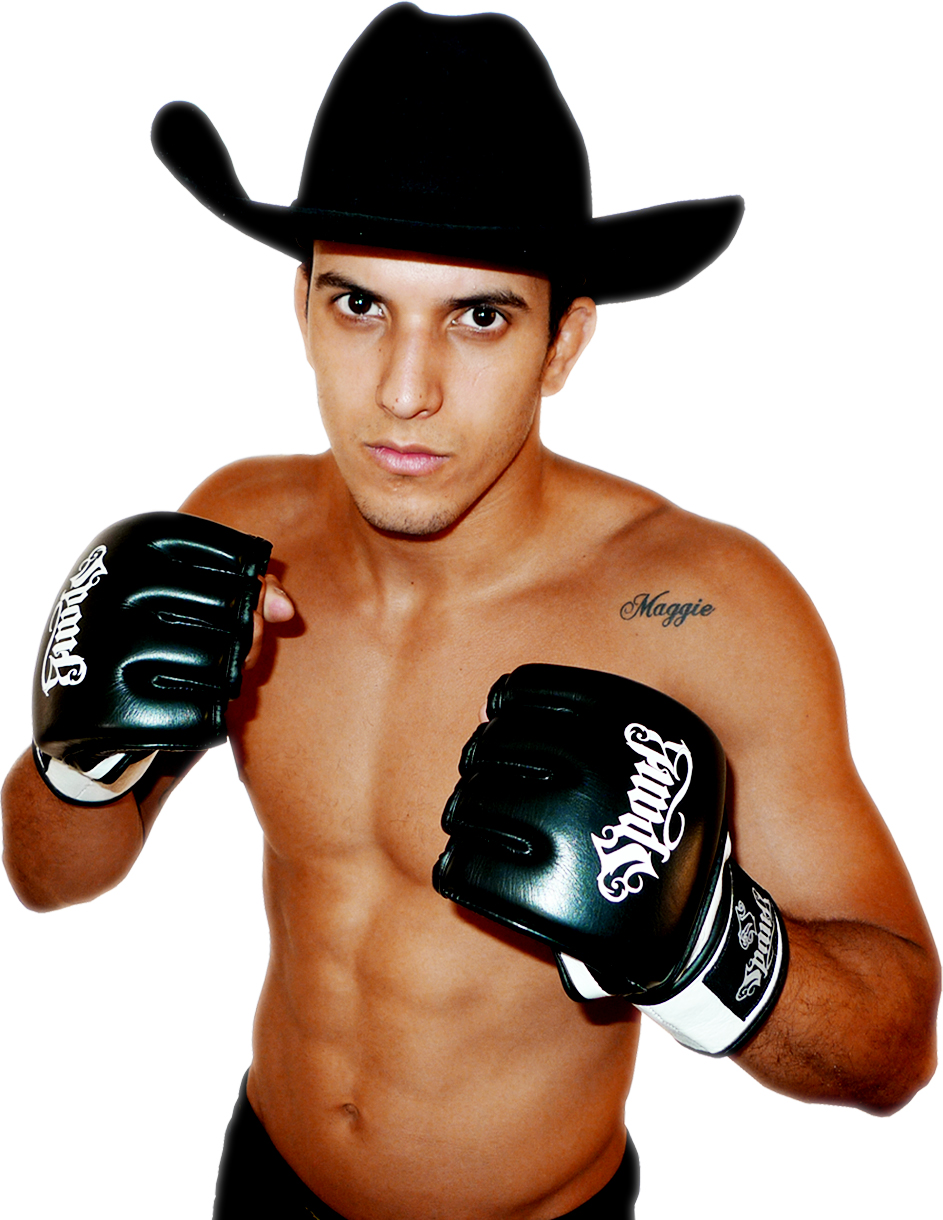
Felipe Sertanejo, Season 10

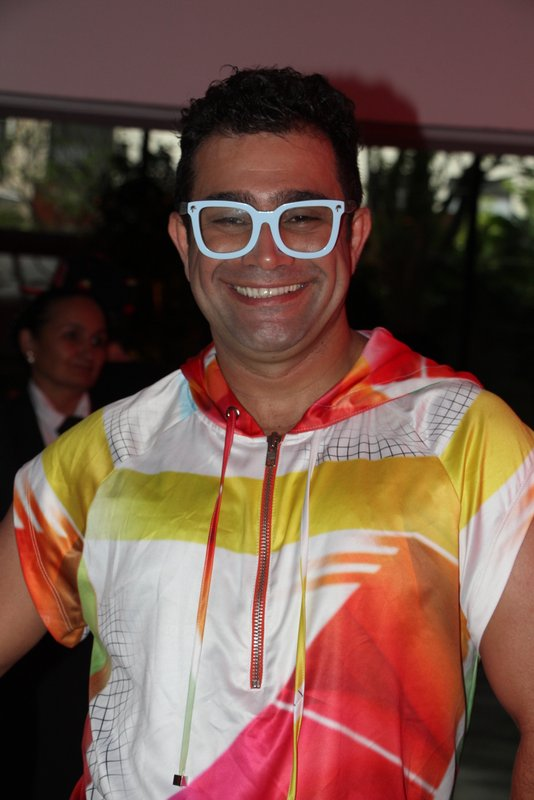
Evandro Santo, Season 10

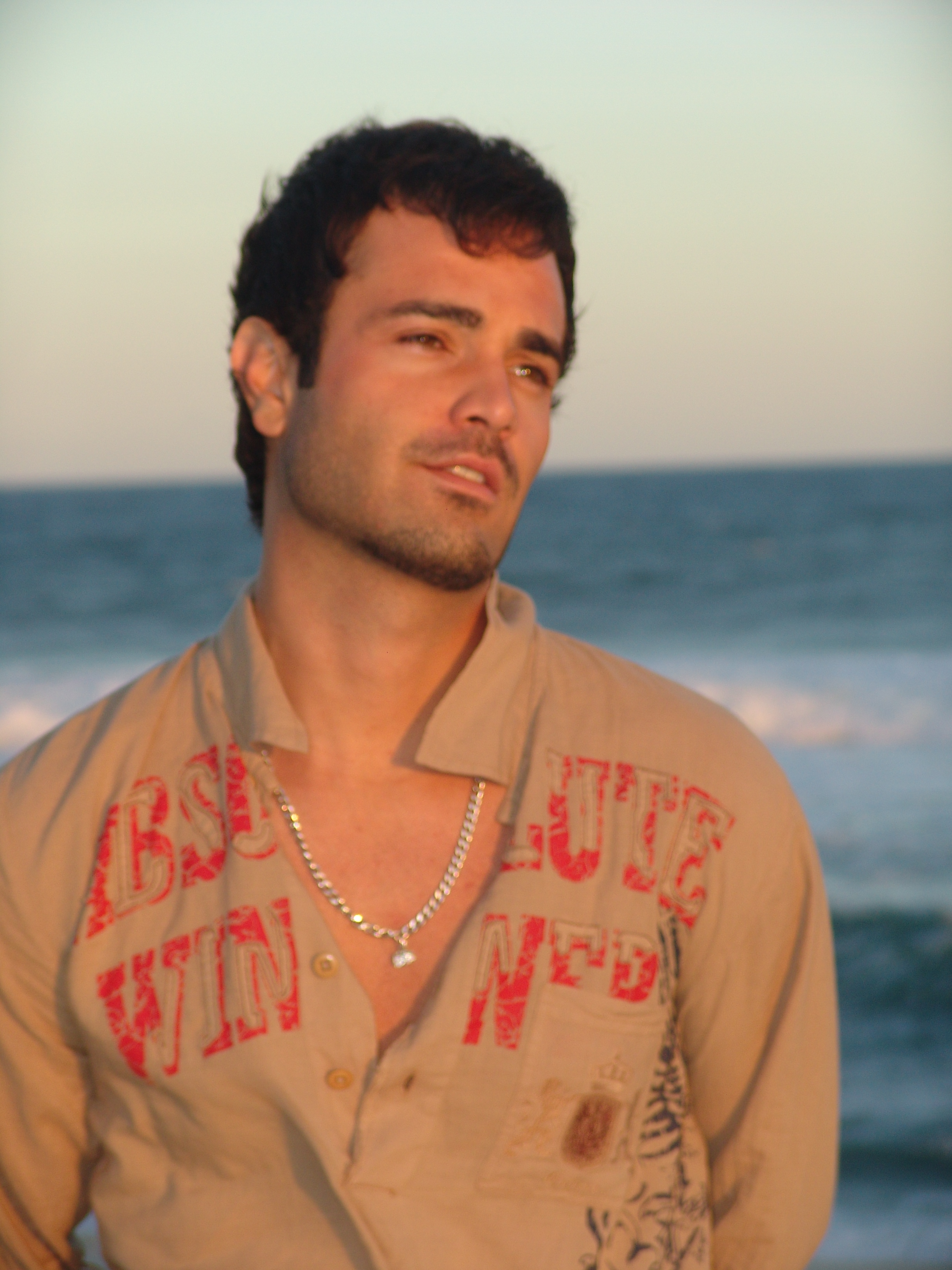
Rodrigo Phavanello, Season 11

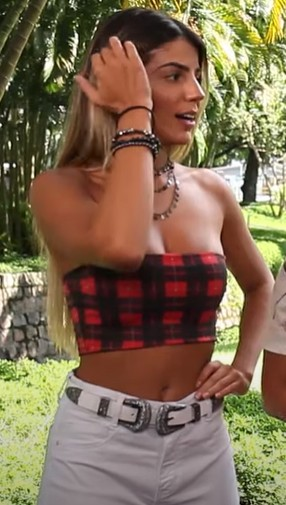
Hariany Almeida, Season 11

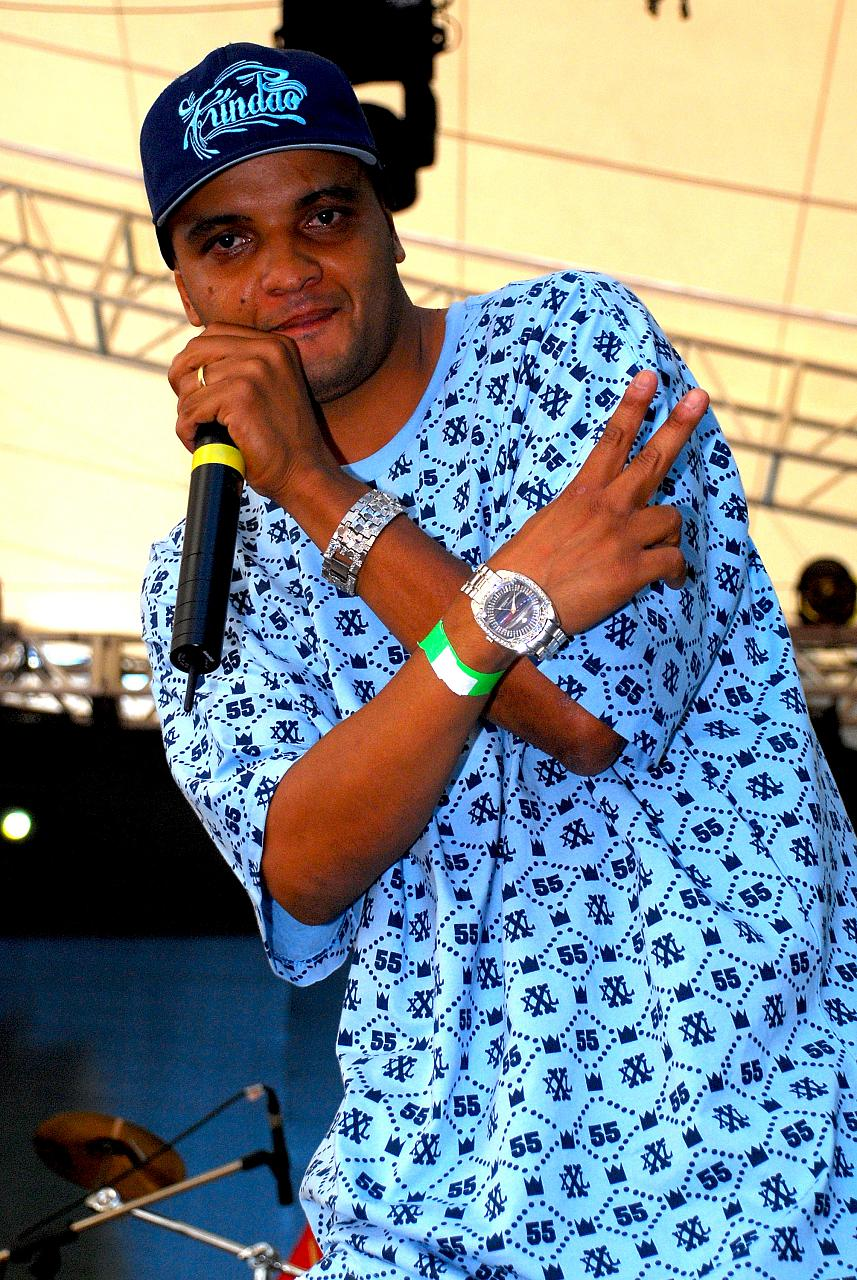
Fernandinho Beatbox, Season 12

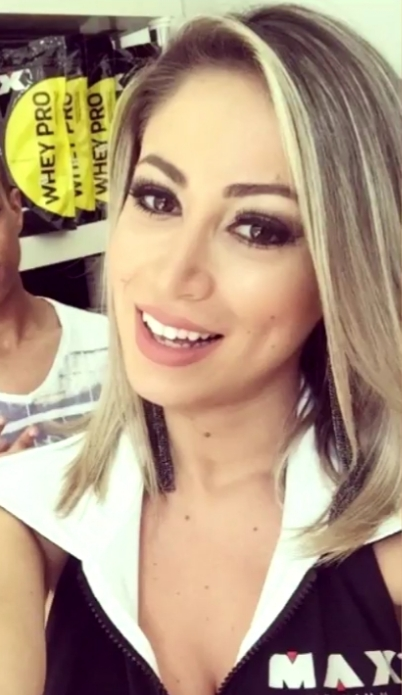
Carol Narizinho, Season 12

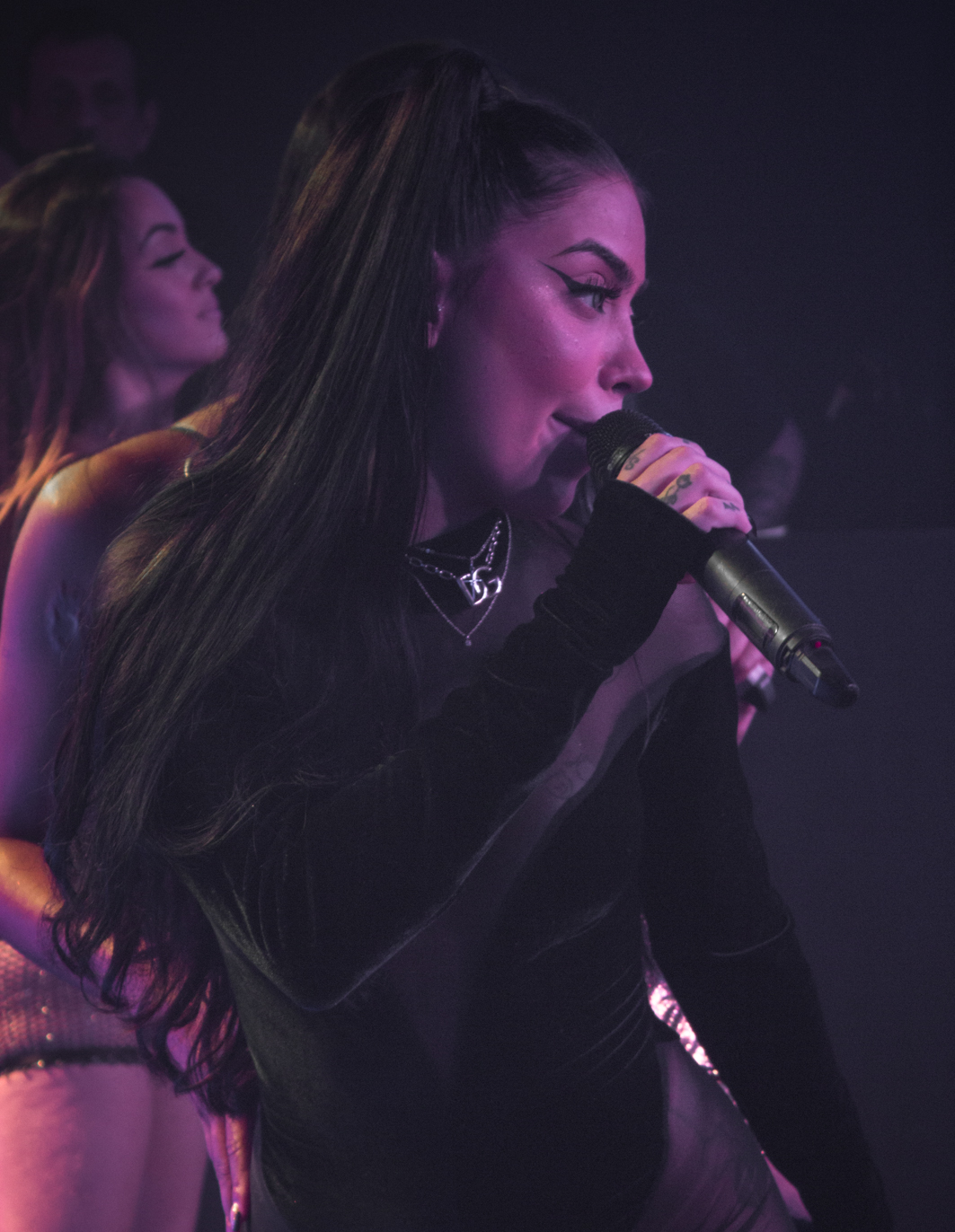
MC Mirella, Season 12

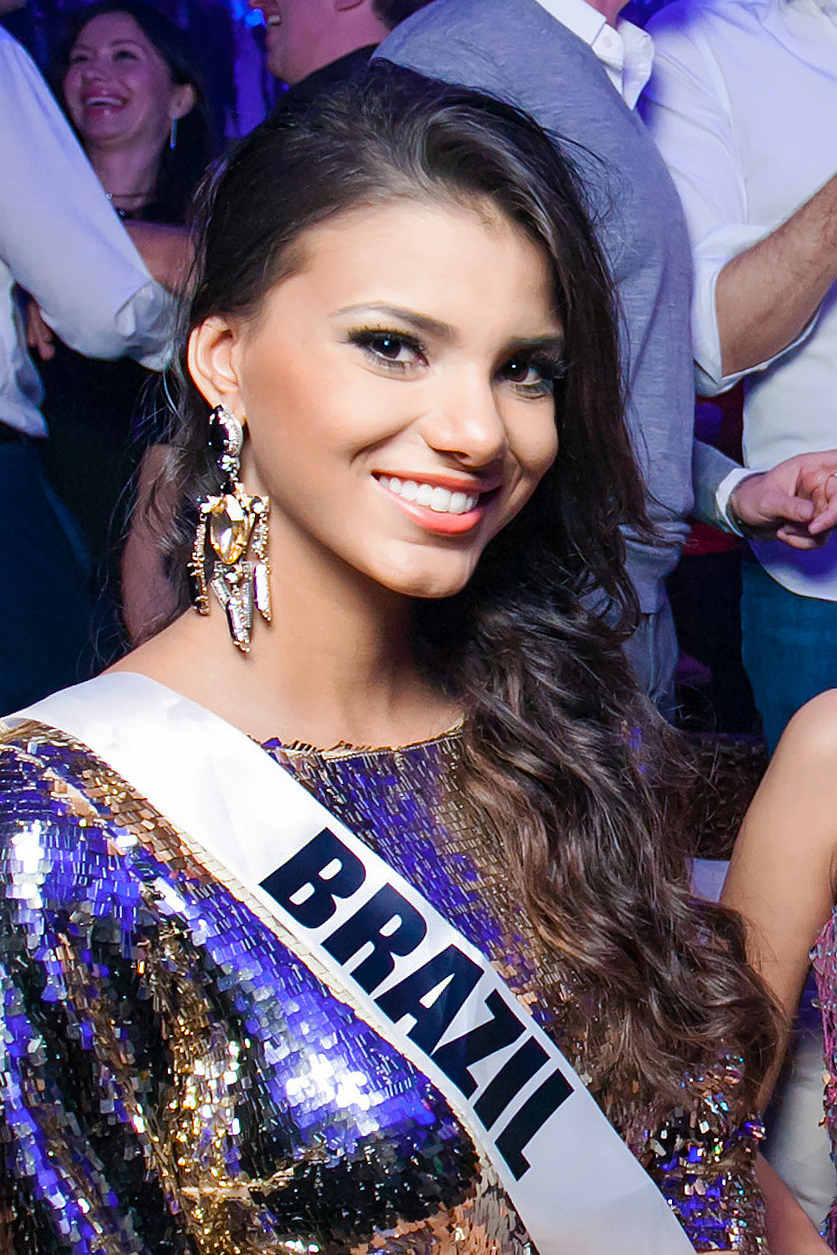
Jakelyne Oliveira, Season 12

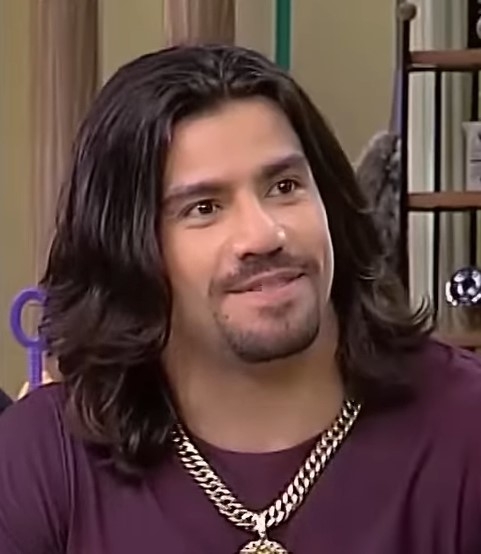
Mariano, Season 12

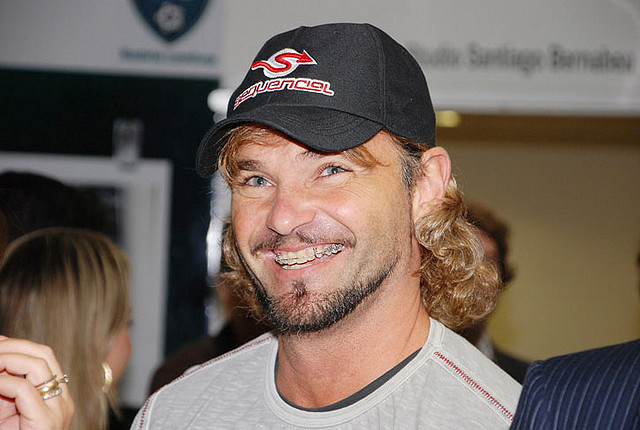
Mateus Carrieri, Season 12

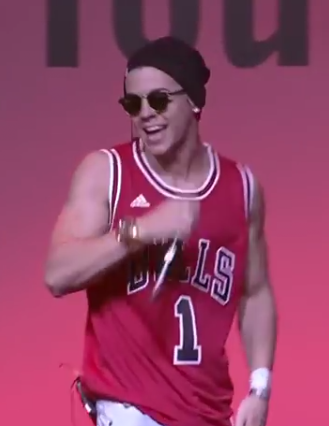
Biel, Season 12

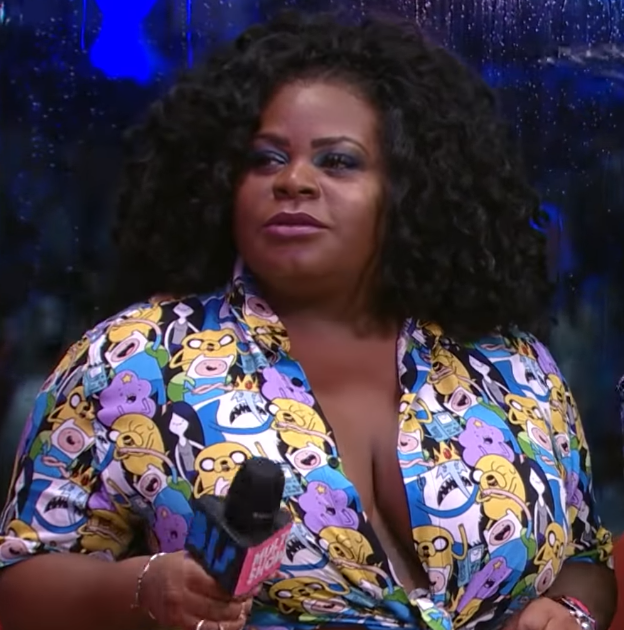
Jojo Todynho, Season 12 Champion

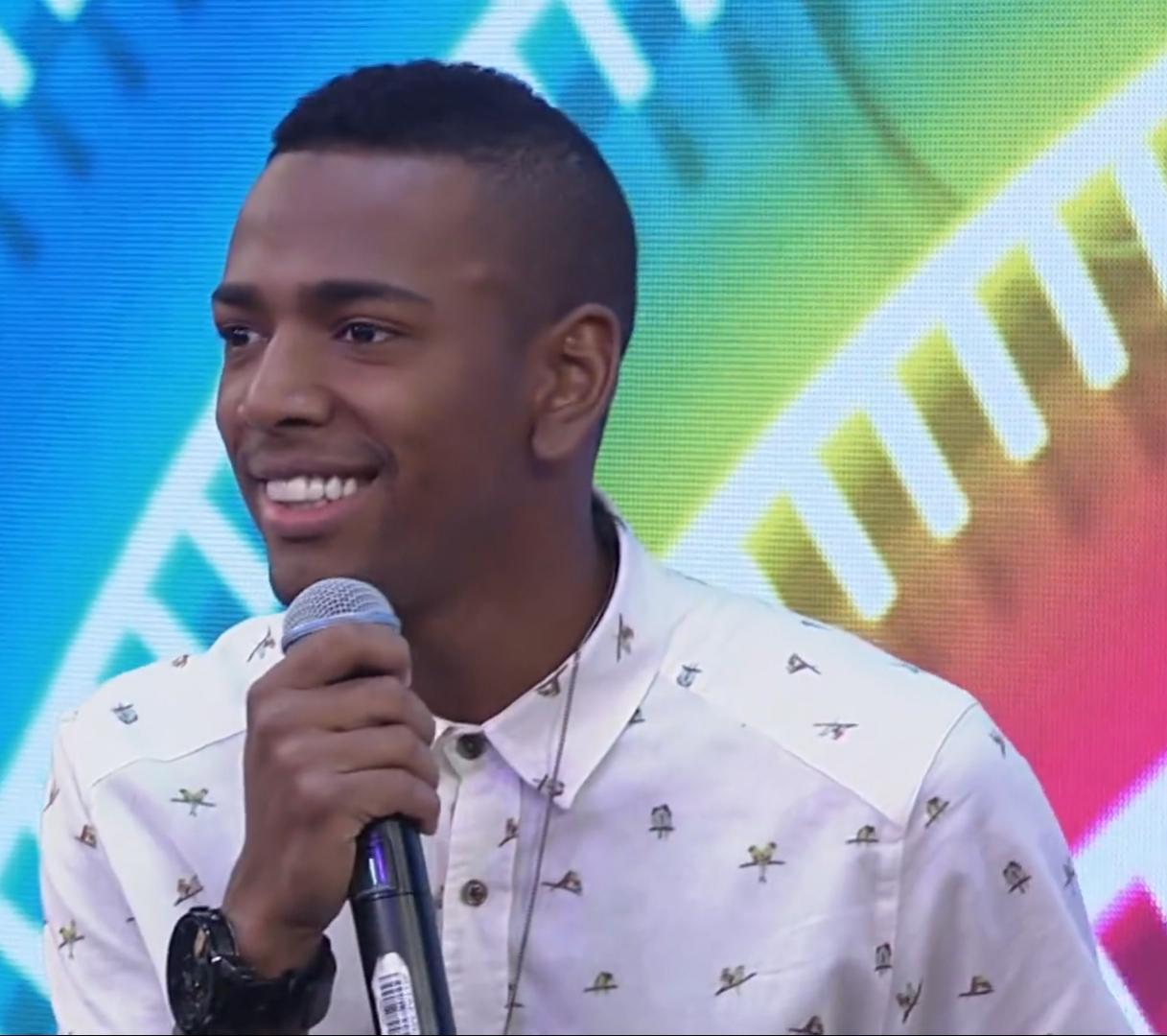
Nego do Borel, Season 13

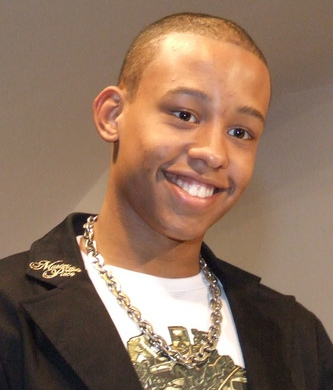
Mussunzinho, Season 13

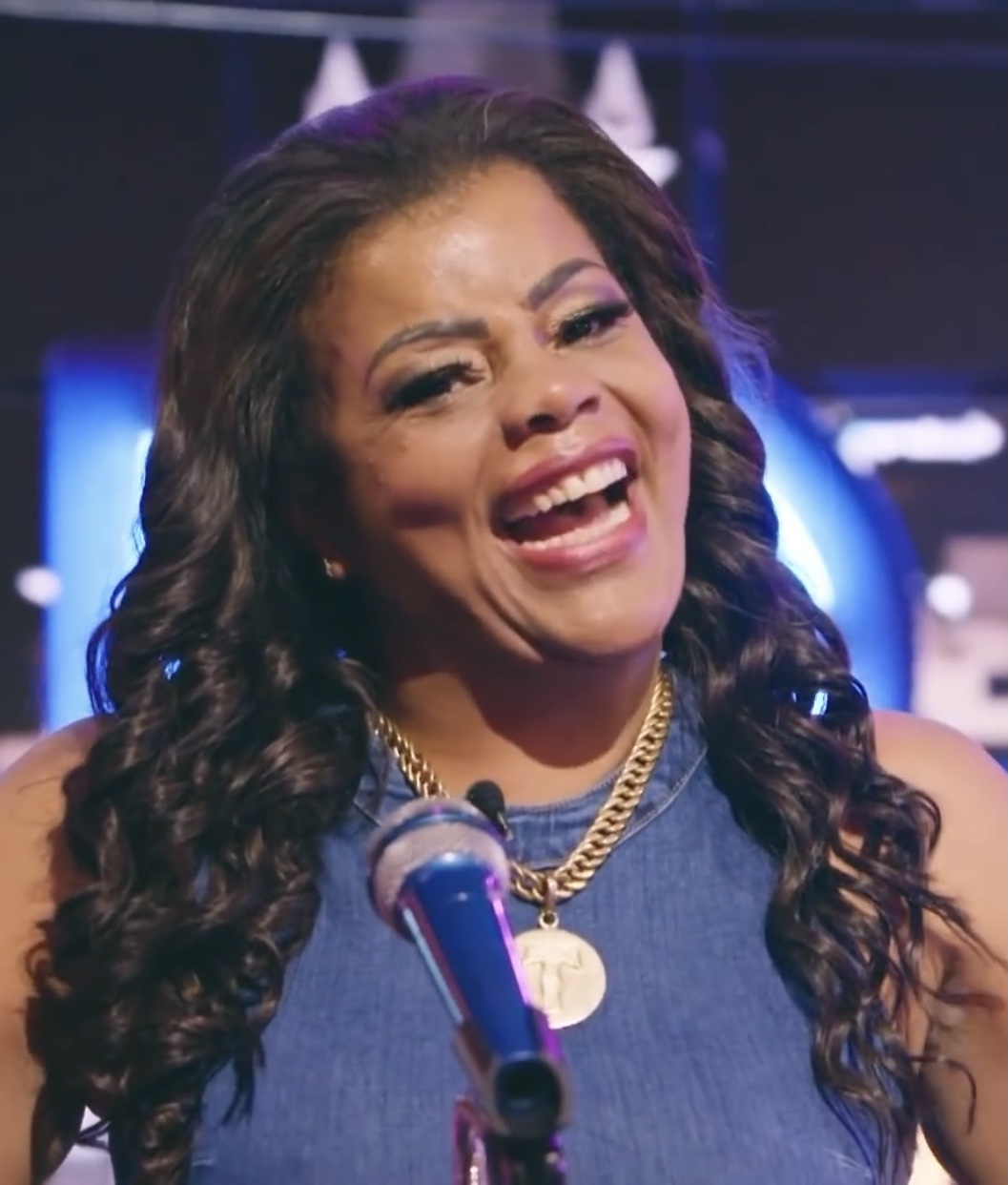
Tati Quebra Barraco, Season 13

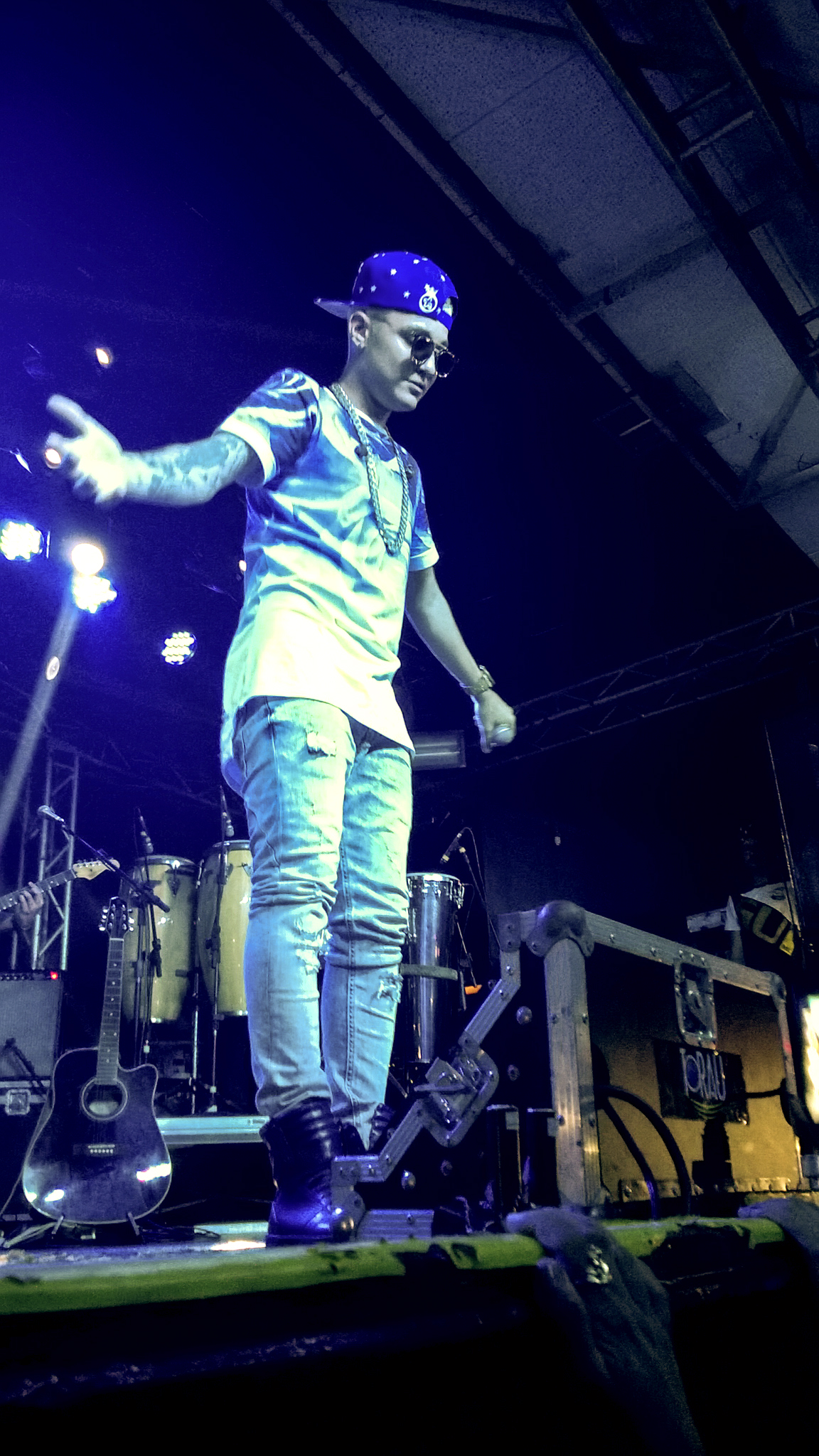
MC Gui, Season 13

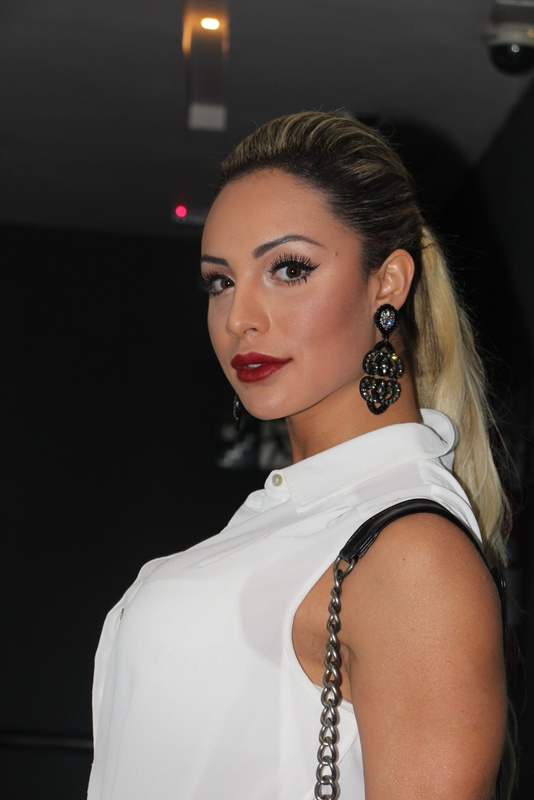
Aline Mineiro, Season 13

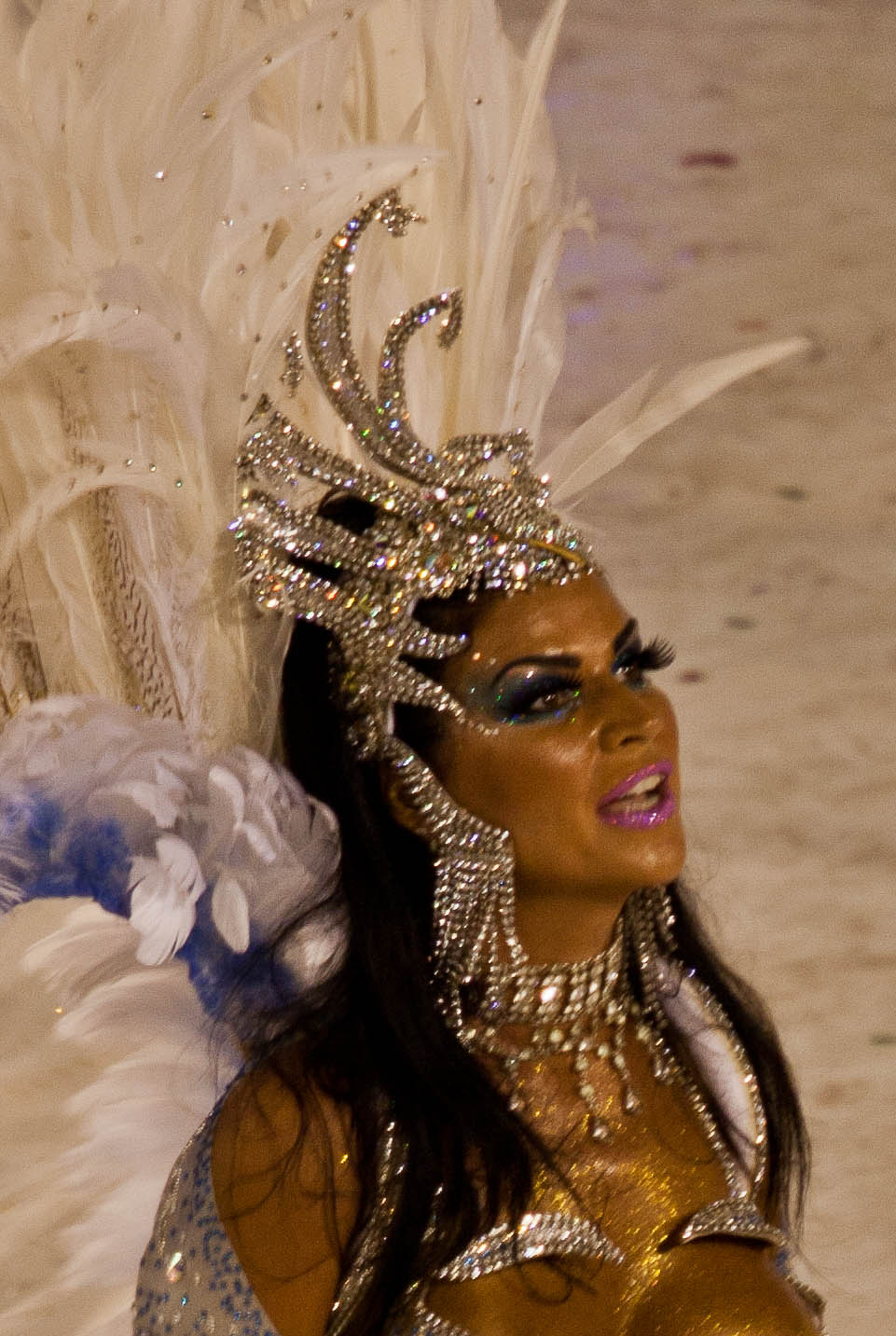
Solange Gomes, Season 13

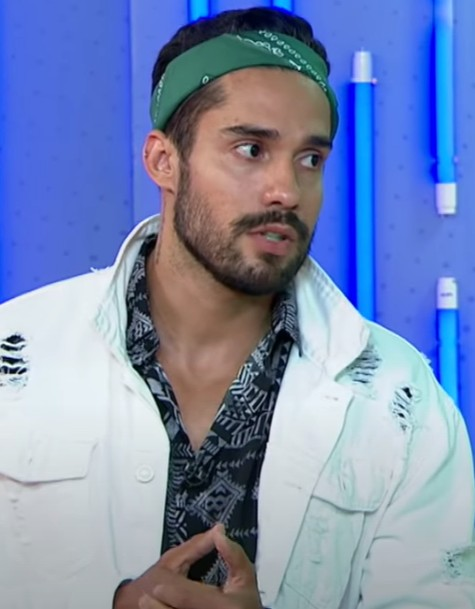
Bil Araújo, Season 13

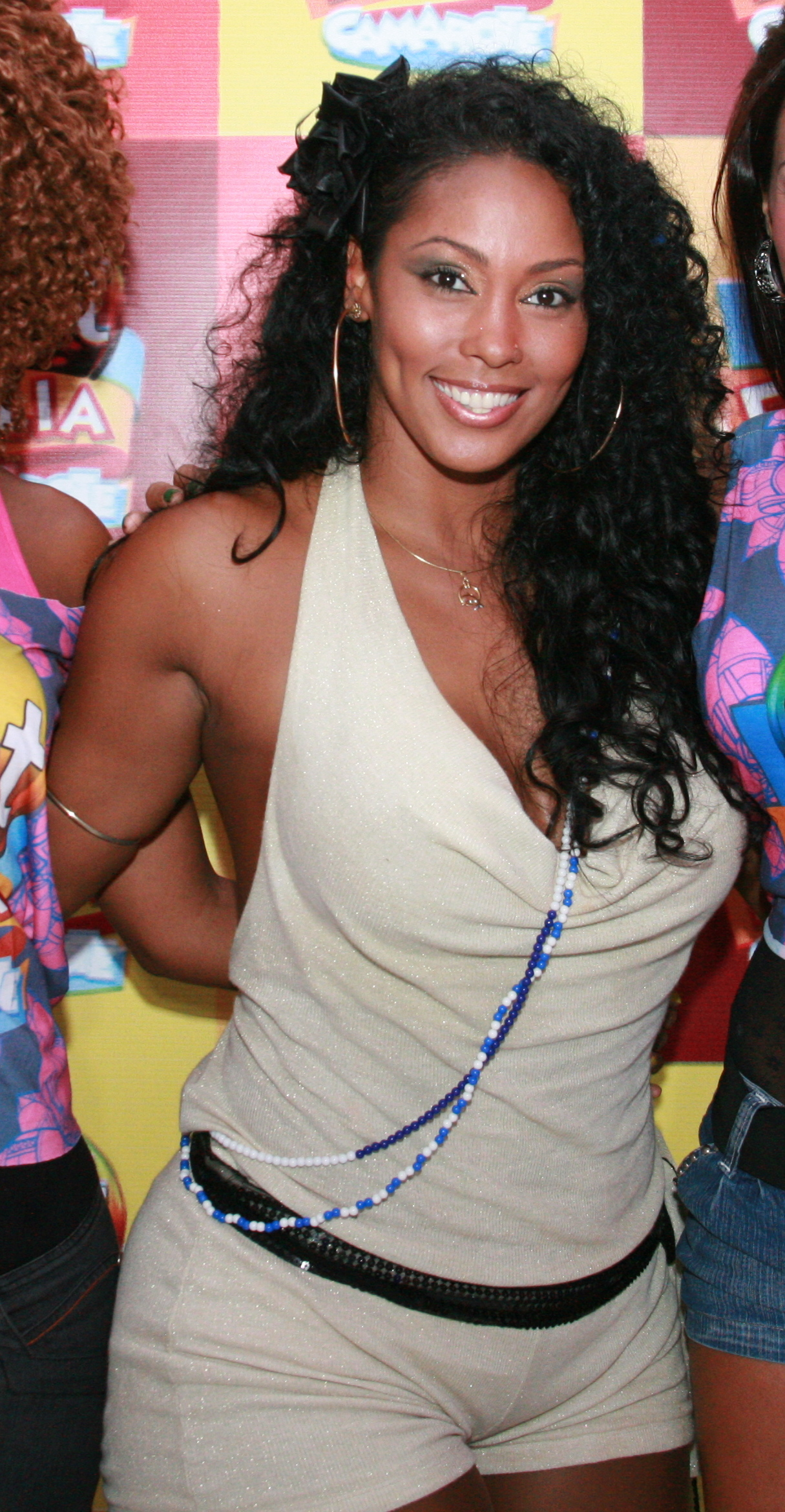
Rosiane Pinheiro, Season 14

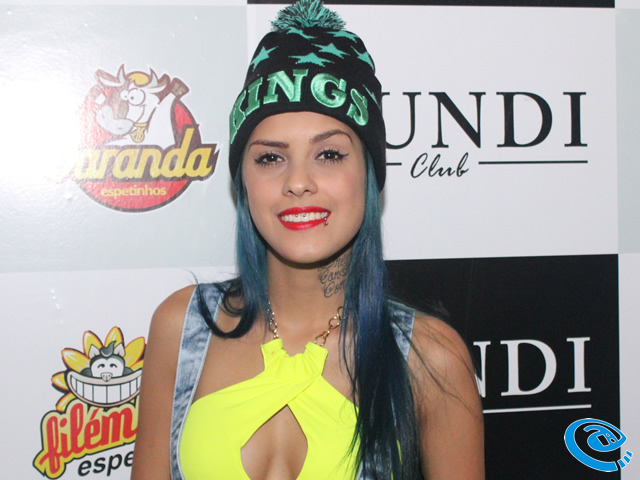
Tati Zaqui, Season 14

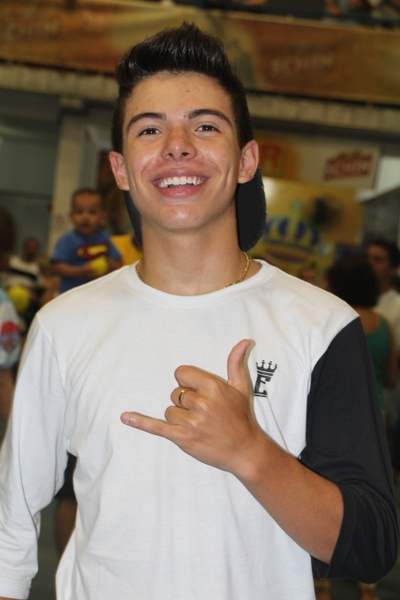
Thomaz Costa, Season 14

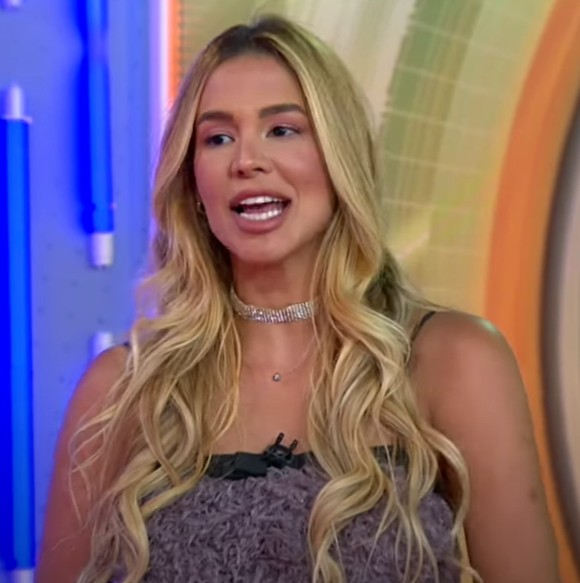
Kerline Cardoso, Season 14

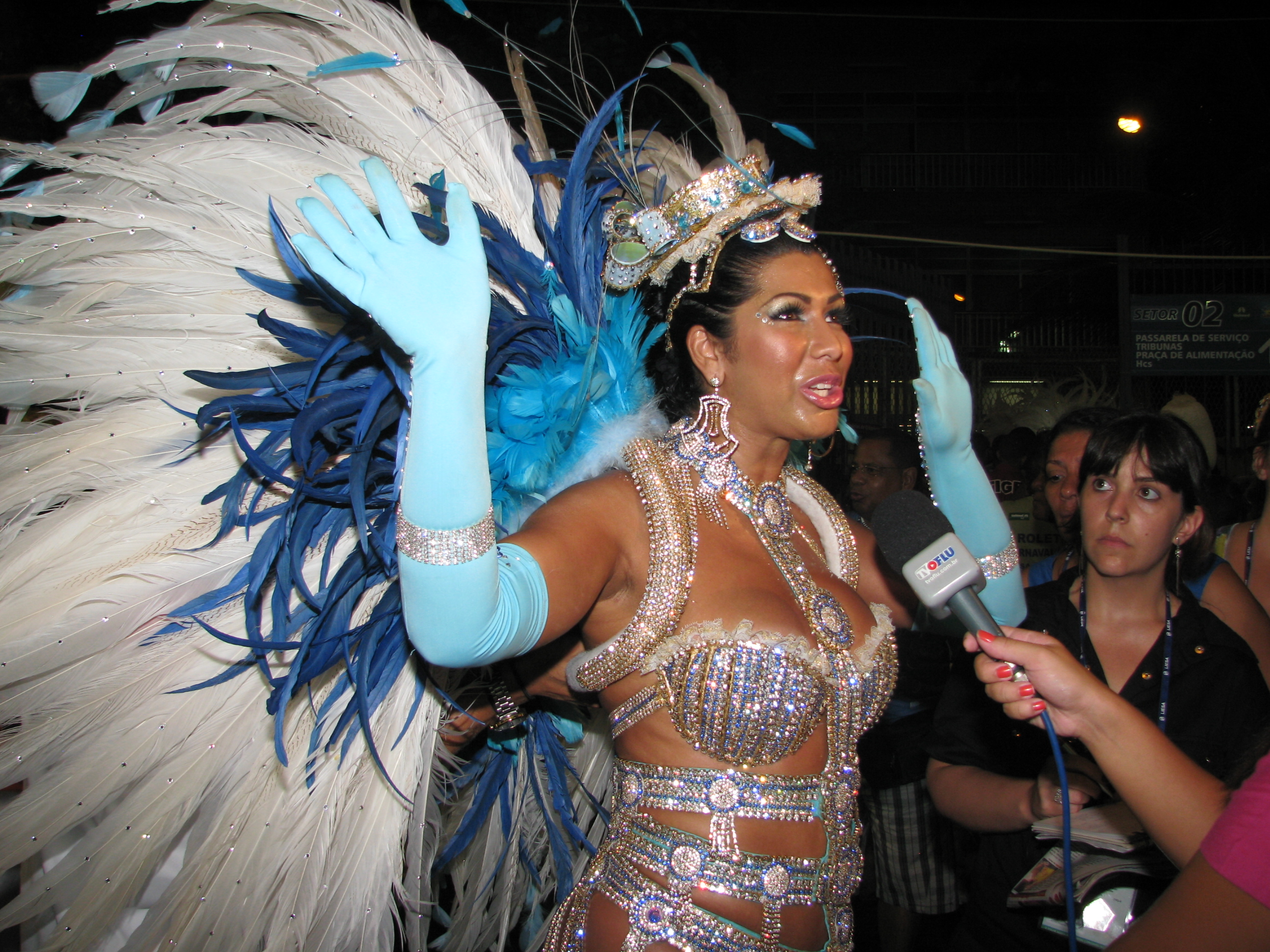
Ellen Moranguinho, Season 14

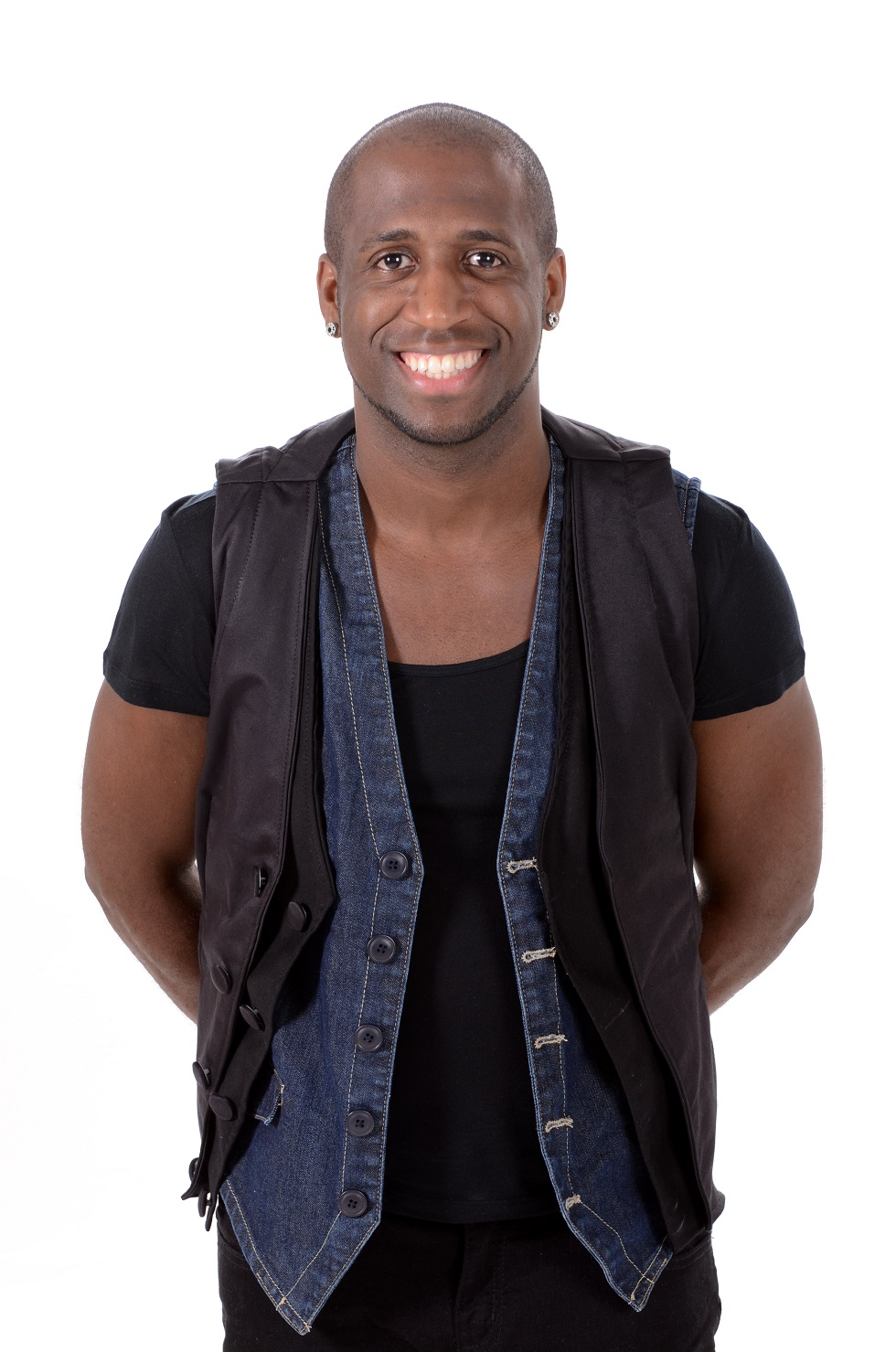
André Marinho, Season 14

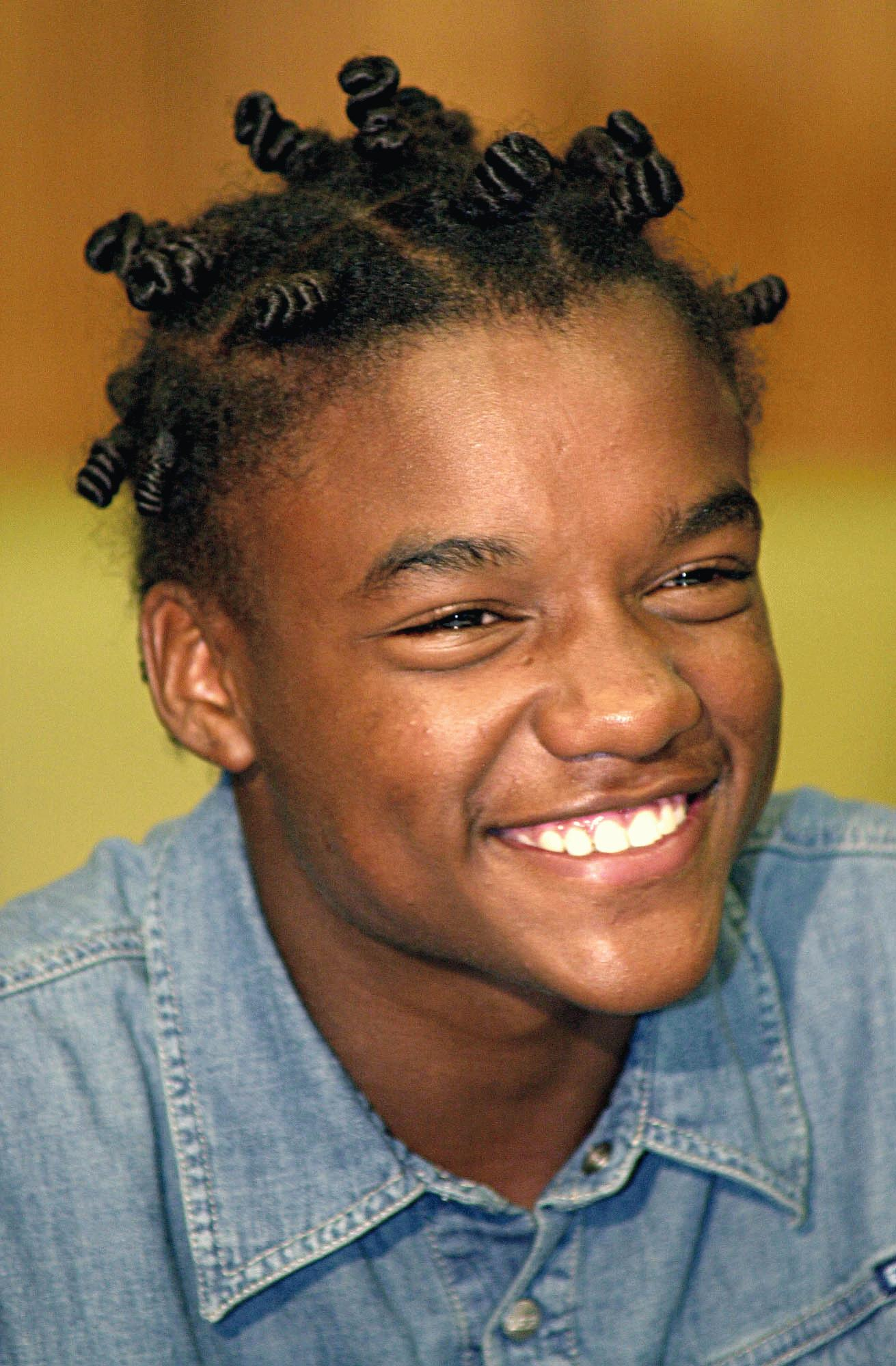
Laranjinha, Season 15

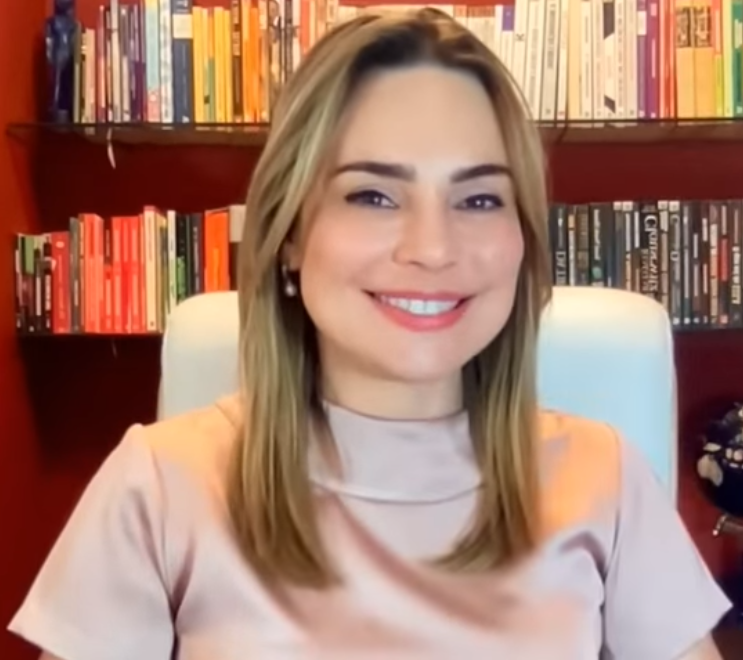
Rachel Sheherazade, Season 15

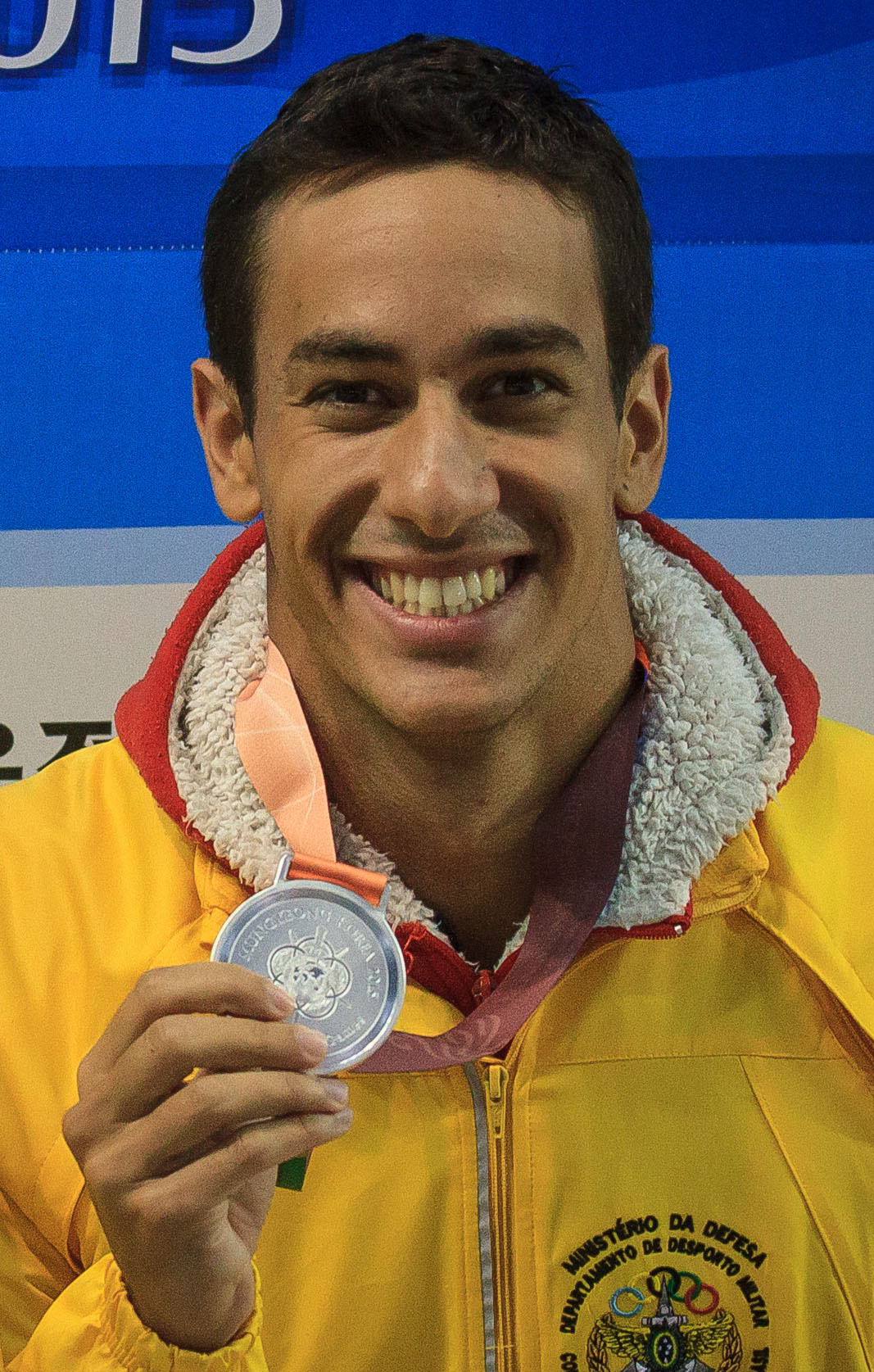
Henrique Martins, Season 15

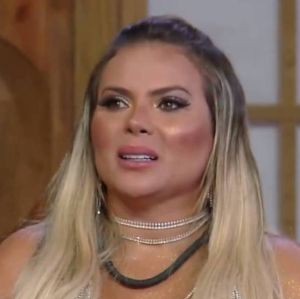
Kally Fonseca, Season 15

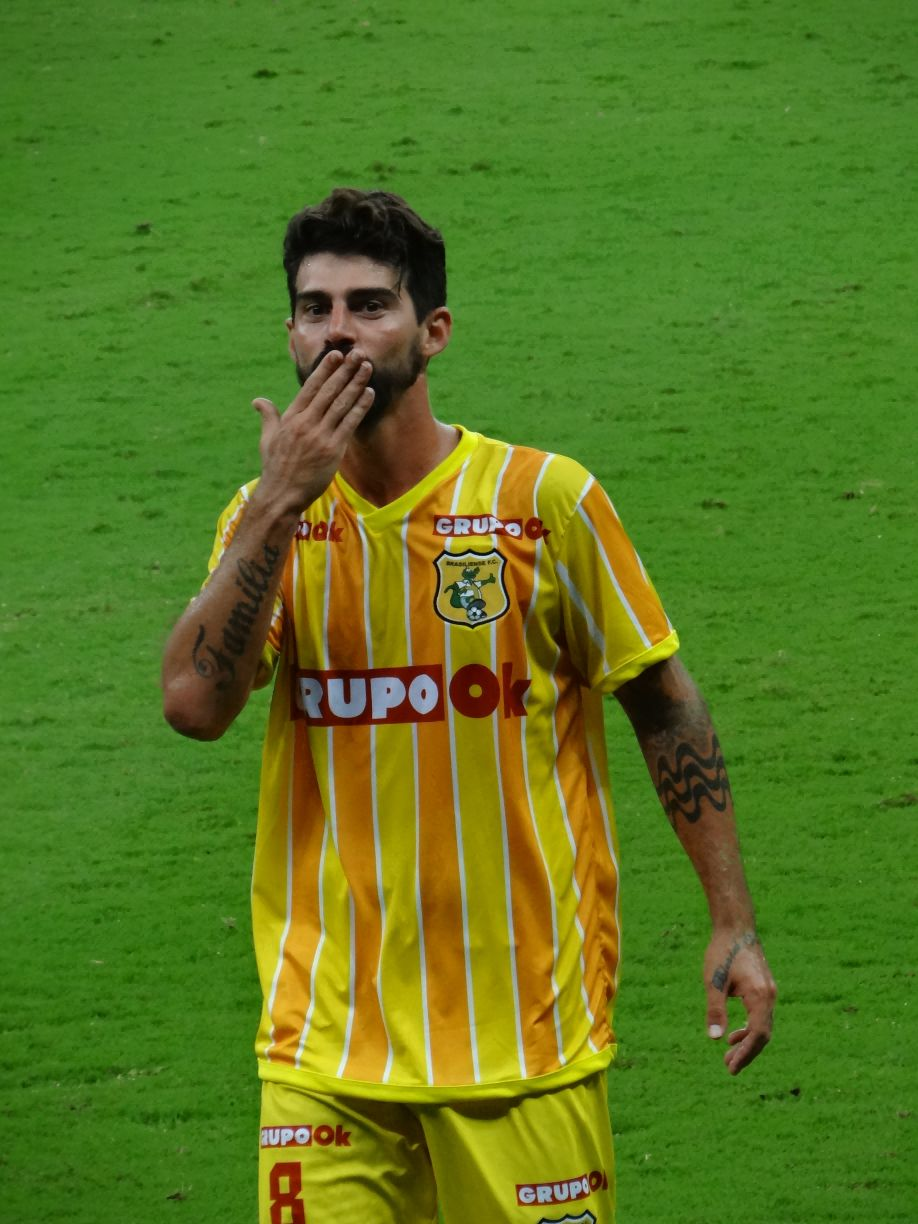
Radamés Furlan, Season 15

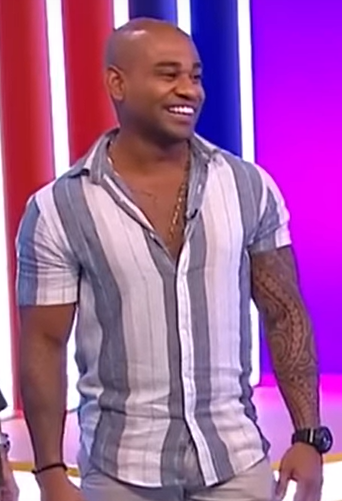
Cezar Black, Season 15

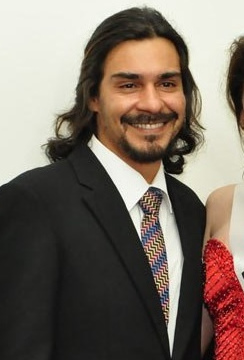
André Gonçalves, Season 15

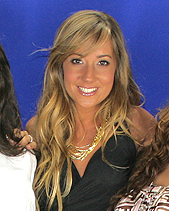
Vivi Fernandez, Season 16

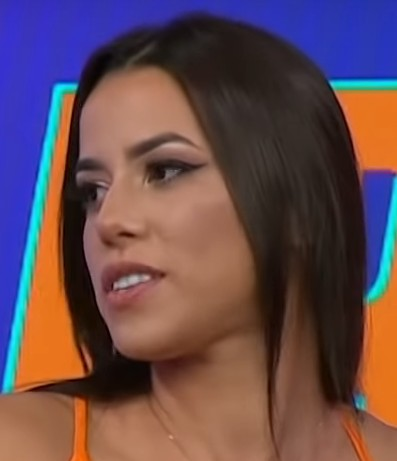
Larissa Tomásia, Season 16

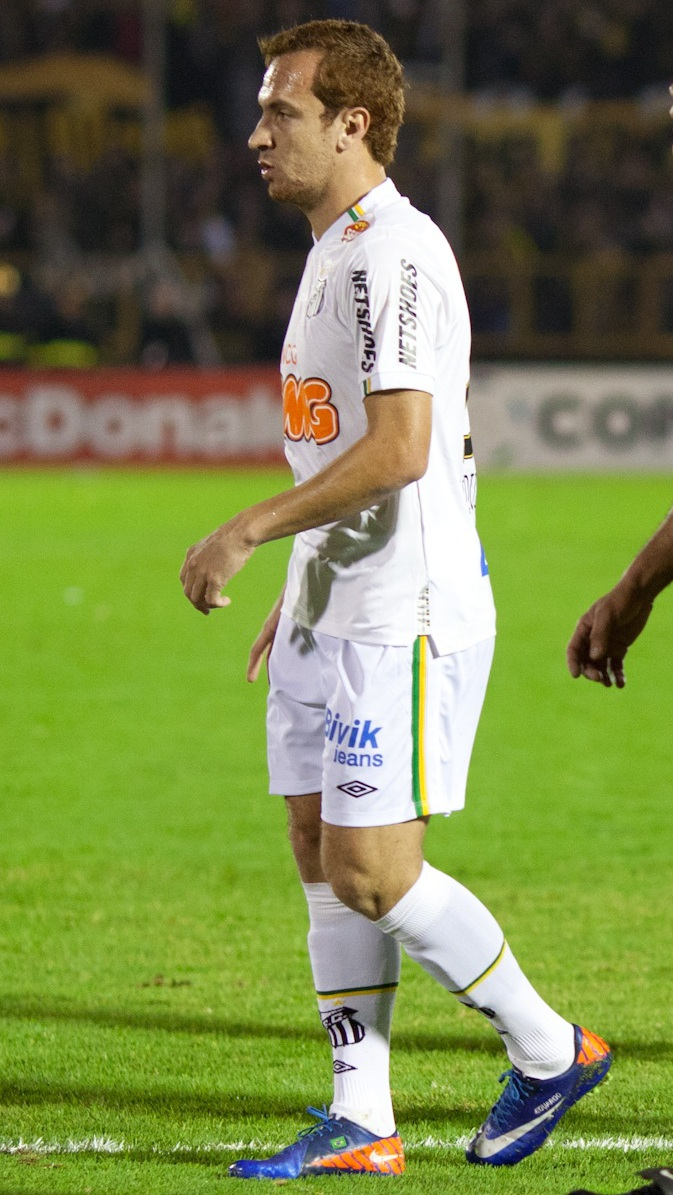
Zé Love, Season 16

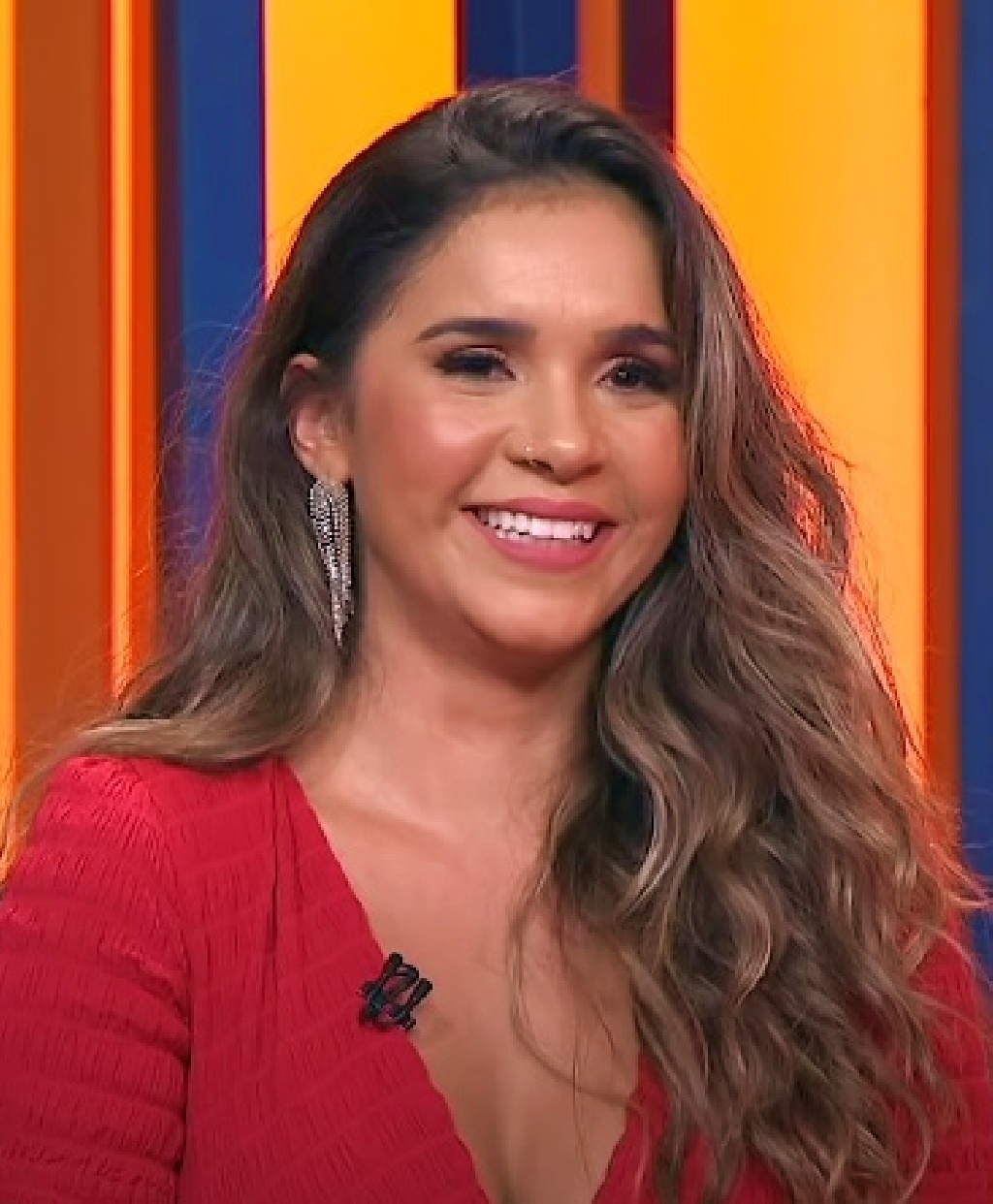
Gizelly Bicalho, Season 16

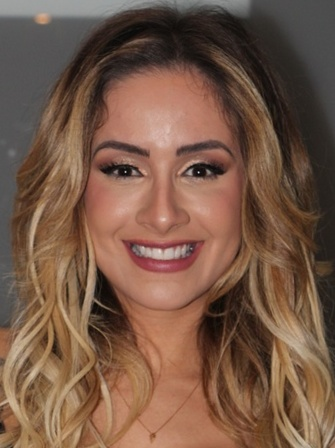
Babi Muniz, Season 16

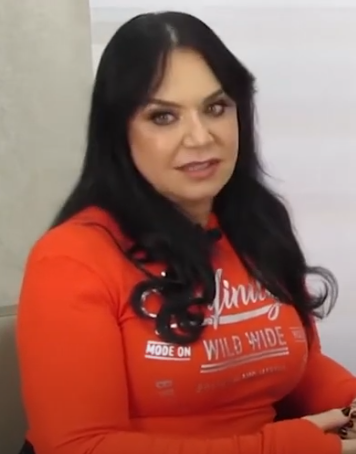
Flor Fernandez, Season 16

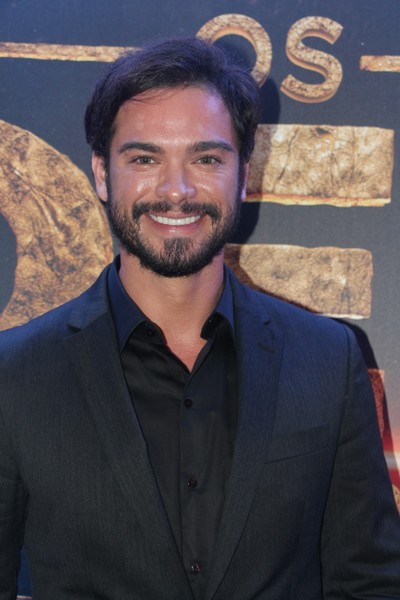
Sidney Sampaio, Season 16

Contestant played the game for a second time.

Season	Name	Age	Profession	Hometown	Status	Finish
1	Franciely Freduzeski	30	Actress	Laranjeiras do Sul	Evicted: Day 08	15th
1	Bárbara Koboldt	33	Reporter	Porto Alegre	Walked: Day 09	14th
1	Babi Xavier	34	TV Host	Niterói	Evicted: Day 15	13th
1	Théo Becker	32	Actor	Pelotas	Evicted: Day 22	12th
1	Fábio Arruda †	38	Style Consultant	Rio de Janeiro	Evicted: Day 29	11th
1	Miro Moreira	25	Model	São Paulo	Evicted: Day 36	10th
1	Luciele di Camargo	31	Actress	Goiânia	Evicted: Day 43	9th
1	Mirella Santos	25	Dancer	Florianópolis	Evicted: Day 50	8th
1	Jonathan Haagensen	25	Actor	Rio de Janeiro	Evicted: Day 57	7th
1	Fabiana Alvarez	32	Actress	São José	Evicted: Day 64	6th
1	Danielle Souza	28	Model	Lages	Evicted: Day 71	5th
1	Pedro Leonardo	22	Musician	Anápolis	Evicted: Day 78	4th
1	Carlinhos da Silva	28	Comedian	São Paulo	Evicted: Day 81	3rd
1	Danni Carlos	33	Singer	Rio de Janeiro	Finalist: Day 85	Runner-up
1	Dado Dolabella	28	Actor	Rio de Janeiro	Finalist: Day 85	Winner
2	Ana Paula Oliveira	31	Assistant Referee	São Paulo	Evicted: Day 08	14th
2	Maria João Abujamra	28	Reporter	São Paulo	Evicted: Day 15	13th
2	Adriana Bombom	35	Dancer	Rio de Janeiro	Evicted: Day 22	12th
2	Andressa Oliveira	21	Actress	São Paulo	Evicted: Day 29	11th
2	Fernando Scherer	35	Top Swimmer	Florianópolis	Evicted: Day 36	10th
2	Maurício Manieri	39	Musician	São Paulo	Evicted: Day 43	9th
2	Caco Ricci	31	Model	São Paulo	Evicted: Day 50	8th
2	Sheila Mello	31	Dancer	São Paulo	Evicted: Day 57	7th
2	Cacau Melo	25	Actress	Rio de Janeiro	Evicted: Day 64	6th
2	MC Leozinho	32	Funk singer	Niterói	Evicted: Day 71	5th
2	Igor Cotrim	35	Actor	São Paulo	Evicted: Day 78	4th
2	Mateus Rocha	35	Actor	Niterói	Evicted: Day 85	3rd
2	André Segatti	37	Actor	São Paulo	Finalist: Day 89	Runner-up
2	Karina Bacchi	33	Actress	São Manuel	Finalist: Day 89	Winner
3	Monique Evans	54	TV Host	Rio de Janeiro	Evicted: Day 11	15th
3	Geisy Arruda	21	Businesswoman	Diadema	Evicted: Day 18	14th
3	Tico Santa Cruz	32	Singer	Rio de Janeiro	Evicted: Day 25	13th
3	Sergio Mallandro	52	Comedian	Rio de Janeiro	Evicted: Day 32	11th
3	Nany People	45	Drag queen	Machado	Evicted: Day 39	12th
3	Dudu Pelizzari	25	Actor	São Paulo	Evicted: Day 46	10th
3	Viola	41	Football Player	São Paulo	Evicted: Day 53	9th
3	Carlos Carrasco	44	Make Up Artist	São José	Evicted: Day 59	8th
3	Andressa Soares	22	Funk singer	Rio de Janeiro	Evicted: Day 67	7th
3	Janaina Jacobina	29	Reporter	Cuiabá	Evicted: Day 74	6th
3	Ana Carolina Dias	22	Actress	Rio de Janeiro	Evicted: Day 79	5th
3	Luiza Gottschalk	26	TV Host	São Paulo	Evicted: Day 84	4th
3	Lizi Benites	30	Model & Former Panicat	Porto Alegre	Finalist: Day 87	3rd
3	Sérgio Abreu	34	Actor	Rio de Janeiro	Finalist: Day 87	Runner-up
3	Daniel Bueno	33	Model	Porto Alegre	Finalist: Day 87	Winner
4
4	Renata Banhara	36	Media Personality	Taubaté	Evicted: Day 11	16th
4	François Teles	37	Model	Vitória	Evicted: Day 18	15th
4	Duda Yankovich	34	WIBA Boxer Champion	Jagodina, Serbia	Ejected: Day 23	14th
4	Taciane Ribeiro	23	Model	Itapira	Evicted: Day 25	13th
4	João Kléber	53	TV Host	São Paulo	Evicted: Day 32	12th
4	Dani Bolina	27	Model & Former Panicat	Porto Alegre	Evicted: Day 39	11th
4	Anna Markun	36	Actress	Rio de Janeiro	Evicted: Day 46	10th
4	Compadre Washington	50	É o Tchan! Vocalist	Salvador	Evicted: Day 53	9th
4	Gui Pádua	37	Parachutist	São Paulo	Evicted: Day 60	8th
4	Dinei	40	Former Football Player	São Paulo	Evicted: Day 67	7th
4	Thiago Gagliasso	22	Actor	Rio de Janeiro	Evicted: Day 74	6th
4	Marlon	33	Musician	Criciúma	Evicted: Day 79	5th
4	Valesca Popozuda	32	Funk Singer	Rio de Janeiro	Evicted: Day 84	4th
4	Raquel Pacheco	26	DJ & Writer	São Paulo	Finalist: Day 87	3rd
4	Monique Evans	55	TV Host	Rio de Janeiro	Finalist: Day 87	Runner-up
4	Joana Machado	30	Personal trainer	Rio de Janeiro	Finalist: Day 87	Winner
5	Lui Mendes	41	Actor & Producer	Rio de Janeiro	Evicted: Day 11	16th
5	Gustavo Salyer	36	Model & Actor	Rio de Janeiro	Evicted: Day 18	15th
5	Sylvinho Blau Blau	47	Musician	Rio de Janeiro	Evicted: Day 25	14th
5	Shayene Cesário	25	Brazilian Carnival Star	Rio de Janeiro	Evicted: Day 32	13th
5	Rodrigo Capella	30	Comedian	Rio de Janeiro	Evicted: Day 39	12th
5	Gretchen	53	Singer	Rio de Janeiro	Walked: Day 41	11th
5	Ângela Bismarchi	46	Media Personality	Rio de Janeiro	Evicted: Day 53	10th
5	Diego Pombo	25	Football Referee	Salvador	Evicted: Day 60	9th
5	Penélope Nova	38	TV Host	Salvador	Evicted: Day 67	8th
5	Vava	38	Musician	Santos	Evicted: Day 74	7th
5	Simone Sampaio	35	Dancer	São Paulo	Evicted: Day 81	6th
5	Robertha Portella	26	Dancer	Rio de Janeiro	Evicted: Day 88	5th
5	Nicole Bahls	26	Model & Former Panicat	Londrina	Evicted: Day 91	4th
5	Leo Aquilla	42	Drag queen	Teófilo Otoni	Finalist: Day 94	3rd
5	Felipe Folgosi	38	Actor	São Paulo	Finalist: Day 94	Runner-up
5	Viviane Araújo	37	Model & Actress	Rio de Janeiro	Finalist: Day 94	Winner
6
6	Márcio Duarte	39	Singer	Santos	Evicted: Day 11	16th
6	Lu Schievano	38	Singer & Actress	São Paulo	Evicted: Day 18	15th
6	Aryane Steinkopf	25	Former Panicat	Vila Velha	Evicted: Day 25	14th
6	Rita Cadillac	59	Singer & Dancer	Rio de Janeiro	Evicted: Day 32	13th
6	Ivo Meirelles	51	Musician	Rio de Janeiro	Evicted: Day 46	12th
6	Scheila Carvalho	39	TV Host	Juiz de Fora	Evicted: Day 53	11th
6	Paulo Nunes	41	Former Football Player	Pontalina	Evicted: Day 67	10th
6	Beto Malfacini	31	International Model	Rio de Janeiro	Evicted: Day 74	9th
6	Yudi Tamashiro	20	TV Host & Singer	Santos	Evicted: Day 81	8th
6	Andressa Urach	25	Media Personality	Porto Alegre	Evicted: Day 86	7th
6	Yani de Simone	25	Funk Singer	Rio de Janeiro	Evicted: Day 92	6th
6	Gominho	24	Reporter	Rio de Janeiro	Evicted: Day 96	5th
6	Mateus Verdelho	29	Model & DJ	São Paulo	Evicted: Day 97	4th
6	Marcos Oliver	36	Actor	Taubaté	Finalist: Day 100	3rd
6	Denise Rocha	29	Lawyer	Brasília	Finalist: Day 100	Runner-up
6	Bárbara Evans	21	Model	Rio de Janeiro	Finalist: Day 100	Winner
7
7	Oscar Maroni	63	Businessman	Jundiaí	Evicted: Day 21	17th
7	Diego Cristo	35	Actor	Ponta Grossa	Evicted: Day 28	16th
7	Roy Rosselló	43	Musician	Río Piedras, Puerto Rico	Evicted: Day 35	15th
7	Lorena Bueri	26	Model	Pirapora	Evicted: Day 42	14th
7	Cristina Mortágua	44	Model	Rio de Janeiro	Evicted: Day 49	13th
7	Robson Caetano	50	Olympic Medalist	Rio de Janeiro	Evicted: Day 56	12th
7	Felipeh Campos	40	Journalist	São Paulo	Evicted: Day 63	11th
7	Débora Lyra	24	Miss Brasil 2010	Vitória	Evicted: Day 68	10th
7	Bruna Tang	35	Singer & TV Host	Belo Horizonte	Evicted: Day 70	9th
7	Marlos Cruz	35	Model & Actor	Rio de Janeiro	Evicted: Day 75	8th
7	MC Brunninha	21	Funk Singer	Rio de Janeiro	Evicted: Day 82	7th
7	Andréia Sorvetão	42	Former Paquita	Rio de Janeiro	Evicted: Day 82	6th
7	Leo Rodriguez	25	Sertanejo Singer	Descalvado	Evicted: Day 84	5th
7	Pepê & Neném	39	Singers	Rio de Janeiro	Evicted: Day 87	4th
7	Heloisa Faissol †	44	Socialite	Rio de Janeiro	Finalist: Day 90	3rd
7	Babi Rossi	24	Model & Former Panicat	São Paulo	Finalist: Day 90	Runner-up
7	DH Silveira	27	Cine Vocalist	São Paulo	Finalist: Day 90	Winner
8
8	Amaral	42	Former Football Player	Capivari	Evicted: Day 10	16th
8	Edu K	46	Musician	Porto Alegre	Evicted: Day 17	15th
8	Veridiana Freitas	27	Model	Balneário Camboriú	Evicted: Day 24	14th
8	Ovelha	60	Musician	Olinda	Evicted: Day 31	13th
8	Thiago Servo	29	Sertanejo singer	Maringá	Walked: Day 33	12th
8	Rebeca Gusmão	31	Former Swimmer	Brasília	Evicted: Day 38	11th
8	Li Martins	31	Singer & Actress	Sertanópolis	Evicted: Day 45	10th
8	Quelynah Simão	34	Singer & Actress	São Paulo	Evicted: Day 52	9th
8	Carla Prata	34	Dancer & TV Host	Rio de Janeiro	Evicted: Day 59	8th
8	Mara Maravilha	47	Singer & TV Host	Itapetinga	Evicted: Day 66	7th
8	Marcelo Bimbi	30	Model	Rio Branco	Evicted: Day 71	6th
8	João Paulo Mantovani	31	Model & TV Host	Campinas	Evicted: Day 73	5th
8	Rayanne Morais	27	Beauty Queen	Jeceaba	Evicted: Day 75	4th
8	Luka Ribeiro	44	Actor	Rio de Janeiro	Finalist: Day 78	3rd
8	Ana Paula Minerato	24	Model & Former Panicat	São Paulo	Finalist: Day 78	Runner-up
8	Douglas Sampaio	22	Actor	Rio de Janeiro	Finalist: Day 78	Winner
9 (Nova Chance)
9 (Nova Chance)	Nicole Bahls	31	Comedian & TV Host	Londrina	Evicted: Day 10	16th
9 (Nova Chance)	Adriana Bombom	43	TV Host & Reporter	Rio de Janeiro	Evicted: Day 17	15th
9 (Nova Chance)	Fábio Arruda †	47	Style Consultant & TV Host	Rio de Janeiro	Evicted: Day 24	14th
9 (Nova Chance)	Dinei	47	Former Football Player	São Paulo	Evicted: Day 31	13th
9 (Nova Chance)	Nahim †	65	TV Host & Singer	Miguelópolis	Evicted: Day 38	12th
9 (Nova Chance)	Conrado	49	Singer	Belo Horizonte	Evicted: Day 45	11th
9 (Nova Chance)	Aritana Maroni	38	Chef	São Paulo	Evicted: Day 52	10th
9 (Nova Chance)	Ana Paula Minerato	26	Model & Reporter	São Paulo	Evicted: Day 59	9th
9 (Nova Chance)	Marcelo Zangrandi	31	Comedian & Businessman	São Paulo	Evicted: Day 66	8th
9 (Nova Chance)	Monique Amin	29	Model & Businesswoman	Porto Alegre	Evicted: Day 73	7th
9 (Nova Chance)	Yuri Fernandes	31	Model & Sports Businessman	Goiânia	Evicted: Day 80	6th
9 (Nova Chance)	Rita Cadillac	63	Actress & Singer	Rio de Janeiro	Evicted: Day 84	5th
9 (Nova Chance)	Monick Camargo	24	Model	Anápolis	Evicted: Day 85	4th
9 (Nova Chance)	Matheus Lisboa	27	YouTuber	Barra Longa	Finalist: Day 87	3rd
9 (Nova Chance)	Marcos Härter	38	Doctor	Porto Alegre	Finalist: Day 87	Runner-up
9 (Nova Chance)	Flávia Viana	33	Actress	São Paulo	Finalist: Day 87	Winner
10 (+ Conectada)
10 (+ Conectada)	Vida Vlatt	59	Actress & Comedian	São Paulo	Evicted: Day 10	16th
10 (+ Conectada)	Sandro Pedroso	34	Actor	Ponta Grossa	Evicted: Day 17	15th
10 (+ Conectada)	Ana Paula Renault	36	Journalist	Belo Horizonte	Evicted: Day 24	14th
10 (+ Conectada)	Perlla	29	Singer	Nilópolis	Evicted: Day 31	13th
10 (+ Conectada)	Aloísio Chulapa	43	Former Football Player	Atalaia	Evicted: Day 38	12th
10 (+ Conectada)	Gabi Prado	31	Model & TV Host	Brasília	Evicted: Day 45	11th
10 (+ Conectada)	Nadja Pessoa	30	Businesswoman	Recife	Ejected: Day 50	10th
10 (+ Conectada)	Fernanda Lacerda	30	Former Panicat	São Bernardo do Campo	Evicted: Day 52	9th
10 (+ Conectada)	Luane Dias	24	YouTuber	Nova Iguaçu	Evicted: Day 59	8th
10 (+ Conectada)	Léo Stronda	26	Rapper & Bodybuilder	Rio de Janeiro	Evicted: Day 66	7th
10 (+ Conectada)	Cátia Paganote	42	Former Paquita	Brasília	Ejected: Day 73	6th
10 (+ Conectada)	Felipe Sertanejo	30	Mixed Martial Artist	São Paulo	Evicted: Day 78	5th
10 (+ Conectada)	Evandro Santo	43	Comedian	Belo Horizonte	Evicted: Day 84	4th
10 (+ Conectada)	Caique Aguiar	24	Model & Personal Trainer	São Paulo	Finalist: Day 87	3rd
10 (+ Conectada)	João Zoli	26	Singer & Actor	Niterói	Finalist: Day 87	Runner-up
10 (+ Conectada)	Rafael Ilha	43	Singer	Rio de Janeiro	Finalist: Day 87	Winner
11
11	Drika Marinho	40	Dancer	Rio de Janeiro	Evicted: Day 10	17th
11	Phellipe Haagensen	25	Actor	Rio de Janeiro	Ejected: Day 13	16th
11	Arícia Silva	26	Former Panicat	Florianópolis	Evicted: Day 17	15th
11	Túlio Maravilha	50	Former Football Player	Goiânia	Evicted: Day 24	14th
11	Tati Dias	29	Businesswoman	São Paulo	Evicted: Day 31	13th
11	Jorge Sousa	38	Event Producer	Rio de Janeiro	Evicted: Day 38	12th
11	Bifão	29	Chef	São Paulo	Evicted: Day 45	11th
11	Andréia de Nóbrega	52	Socialite	Rio de Janeiro	Evicted: Day 52	10th
11	Guilherme Leão	27	Model	São Paulo	Evicted: Day 59	9th
11	Netto	26	DJ	Goiânia	Evicted: Day 66	8th
11	Thayse Teixeira	33	Digital Influencer	Juazeiro do Norte	Evicted: Day 73	7th
11	Viny Vieira	40	Comedian	São João Nepomuceno	Evicted: Day 76	6th
11	Rodrigo Phavanello	42	Actor	Campinas	Evicted: Day 84	5th
11	Sabrina Paiva	24	Beauty Queen	Caconde	Evicted: Day 84	4th
11	Diego Grossi	36	Advertising	Rio de Janeiro	Finalist: Day 87	3rd
11	Hariany Almeida	21	Digital Influencer	Senador Canedo	Finalist: Day 87	Runner-up
11	Lucas Viana	28	Model	Ipatinga	Finalist: Day 87	Winner
12
12	Fernandinho Beatbox	45	Musician	São Paulo	Evicted: Day 12	20th
12	JP Gadêlha	31	Firefighter	Recife	Evicted: Day 19	19th
12	Rodrigo Moraes	35	TV Host	Diadema	Evicted: Day 26	18th
12	Lucas Cartolouco	25	Journalist	São Paulo	Evicted: Day 33	17th
12	Carol Narizinho	30	Former Panicat	Porto Alegre	Evicted: Day 40	16th
12	Luiza Ambiel	48	Actress	Itatiba	Evicted: Day 47	15th
12	Victoria Villarim	29	Model & Dancer	São Paulo	Evicted: Day 54	14th
12	Juliano Ceglia	42	TV Host	São Paulo	Evicted: Day 61	13th
12	Lucas Maciel	26	TV Host	São Paulo	Evicted: Day 68	12th
12	MC Mirella	25	Singer	São Caetano do Sul	Evicted: Day 75	11th
12	Raissa Barbosa	29	Model	Rio Branco	Evicted: Day 82	10th
12	Jakelyne Oliveira	27	Miss Brasil 2013	Rondonópolis	Evicted: Day 89	9th
12	Mariano	33	Singer	Campo Grande	Evicted: Day 96	8th
12	Mateus Carrieri	53	Actor	São Paulo	Evicted: Day 98	7th
12	Lidi Lisboa	35	Actress	Guaíra	Evicted: Day 100	6th
12	Tays Reis	25	Singer	Ilhéus	Evicted: Day 101	5th
12	Lipe Ribeiro	28	Digital Influencer	Curitiba	Finalist: Day 103	4th
12	Stefani Bays	25	Make-up Artist	São Leopoldo	Finalist: Day 103	3rd
12	Biel	24	Singer	Rio de Janeiro	Finalist: Day 103	Runner-up
12	Jojo Todynho	23	Singer	Rio de Janeiro	Finalist: Day 103	Winner
13 (Um Celeiro de Lendas)
13 (Um Celeiro de Lendas)	Medrado	28	Rapper	Guarulhos	Walked: Day 12	22nd
13 (Um Celeiro de Lendas)	Liziane Gutierrez	35	Model	Rio de Janeiro	Evicted: Day 12	21st
13 (Um Celeiro de Lendas)	Nego do Borel	29	Singer	Rio de Janeiro	Ejected: Day 14	20th
13 (Um Celeiro de Lendas)	Mussunzinho	28	Actor	Rio de Janeiro	Evicted: Day 19	19th
13 (Um Celeiro de Lendas)	Erika Schneider	30	Dancer	Recife	Evicted: Day 26	18th
13 (Um Celeiro de Lendas)	Victor Pecoraro	43	Actor	São Caetano do Sul	Evicted: Day 33	17th
13 (Um Celeiro de Lendas)	Lary Bottino	23	Model	Rio de Janeiro	Evicted: Day 40	16th
13 (Um Celeiro de Lendas)	Tati Quebra Barraco	41	Singer	Rio de Janeiro	Evicted: Day 47	15th
13 (Um Celeiro de Lendas)	Erasmo Viana	36	Model	Salvador	Evicted: Day 54	14th
13 (Um Celeiro de Lendas)	Tiago Piquilo	37	Singer	Fartura	Evicted: Day 61	13th
13 (Um Celeiro de Lendas)	Valentina Francavilla	41	Actress	Rome, Italy	Evicted: Day 68	12th
13 (Um Celeiro de Lendas)	Gui Araujo	33	Digital influencer	São Paulo	Evicted: Day 75	11th
13 (Um Celeiro de Lendas)	Dayane Mello	32	Model	Joinville	Evicted: Day 82	10th
13 (Um Celeiro de Lendas)	Mileide Mihaile	32	Digital Influencer	Imperatriz	Evicted: Day 89	9th
13 (Um Celeiro de Lendas)	MC Gui	23	Singer	São Paulo	Evicted: Day 93	8th
13 (Um Celeiro de Lendas)	Aline Mineiro	29	Former Panicat	São Paulo	Evicted: Day 93	7th
13 (Um Celeiro de Lendas)	Dynho Alves	25	Dancer & Singer	Ponta Porã	Evicted: Day 94	6th
13 (Um Celeiro de Lendas)	Sthe Mattos	21	Digital Influencer	Salvador	Evicted: Day 94	5th
13 (Um Celeiro de Lendas)	Marina Ferrari	28	Digital Influencer	Maceió	Finalist: Day 96	4th
13 (Um Celeiro de Lendas)	Solange Gomes	47	Former Model & Writer	Rio de Janeiro	Finalist: Day 96	3rd
13 (Um Celeiro de Lendas)	Bil Araújo	29	Physical Educator	Vila Velha	Finalist: Day 96	Runner-up
13 (Um Celeiro de Lendas)	Rico Melquiades	30	Comedian	Maceió	Finalist: Day 96	Winner
14 (O Celeiro de Lendas)
14 (O Celeiro de Lendas)	Bruno Tálamo	33	Journalist	São Paulo	Evicted: Day 12	21st
14 (O Celeiro de Lendas)	Ingrid Ohara	25	Digital Influencer & TV Host	Belém	Evicted: Day 19	20th
14 (O Celeiro de Lendas)	Rosiane Pinheiro	48	Dancer	Salvador	Evicted: Day 26	19th
14 (O Celeiro de Lendas)	Tati Zaqui	28	Funk Singer	São Caetano do Sul	Evicted: Day 33	18th
14 (O Celeiro de Lendas)	Thomaz Costa	22	Actor	São Paulo	Evicted: Day 40	17th
14 (O Celeiro de Lendas)	Tiago Ramos	24	Football Player & Model	Taguatinga	Ejected: Day 41	16th
14 (O Celeiro de Lendas)	Shayan Haghbin	31	Entrepreneur	Tehran, Iran	Ejected: Day 41	15th
14 (O Celeiro de Lendas)	Vini Büttel	32	Model & Cinematographer	Petrópolis	Evicted: Day 47	14th
14 (O Celeiro de Lendas)	Lucas Santos	21	Actor & Singer	São Paulo	Evicted: Day 54	13th
14 (O Celeiro de Lendas)	Alex Gallete	33	Actor & TV Host	Aracaju	Evicted: Day 61	12th
14 (O Celeiro de Lendas)	Deborah Albuquerque	37	Actress	São Paulo	Evicted: Day 61	11th
14 (O Celeiro de Lendas)	Ruivinha de Marte	25	Comedian	Urucará	Evicted: Day 68	10th
14 (O Celeiro de Lendas)	Kerline Cardoso	30	Digital Influencer	Fortaleza	Evicted: Day 75	9th
14 (O Celeiro de Lendas)	Deolane Bezerra	34	Lawyer	Vitória de Santo Antão	Walked: Day 85	8th
14 (O Celeiro de Lendas)	Pétala Barreiros	23	Digital Influencer	Ribeirão Preto	Walked: Day 86	7th
14 (O Celeiro de Lendas)	Ellen Moranguinho	41	Dancer	São Paulo	Evicted: Day 89	6th
14 (O Celeiro de Lendas)	André Marinho	43	Singer	Rio de Janeiro	Evicted: Day 93	5th
14 (O Celeiro de Lendas)	Pelé Milflows	22	Rapper	São Gonçalo	Evicted: Day 94	4th
14 (O Celeiro de Lendas)	Iran Malfitano	40	Actor	Belo Horizonte	Finalist: Day 96	3rd
14 (O Celeiro de Lendas)	Bia Miranda	18	Dancer & Model	Rio de Janeiro	Finalist: Day 96	Runner-up
14 (O Celeiro de Lendas)	Bárbara Borges	43	Actress	Rio de Janeiro	Finalist: Day 96	Winner
15 (Baseado em Histórias Reais)
15 (Baseado em Histórias Reais)	Nathalia Valente	20	Digital Influencer	São Paulo	Evicted: Day 12	22nd
15 (Baseado em Histórias Reais)	Laranjinha	35	Actor	Rio de Janeiro	Evicted: Day 19	21st
15 (Baseado em Histórias Reais)	Cariúcha	32	Singer	Nova Iguaçu	Evicted: Day 26	20th
15 (Baseado em Histórias Reais)	Rachel Sheherazade	50	Journalist	João Pessoa	Ejected: Day 33	19th
15 (Baseado em Histórias Reais)	Kamila Simioni	37	Businesswoman	Belo Horizonte	Evicted: Day 40	18th
15 (Baseado em Histórias Reais)	Jenny Miranda	34	Digital Influencer	São Paulo	Evicted: Day 47	17th
15 (Baseado em Histórias Reais)	Henrique Martins	31	Olympic Swimmer	Campinas	Evicted: Day 54	16th
15 (Baseado em Histórias Reais)	Sander Mecca	40	Singer	São Paulo	Evicted: Day 61	15th
15 (Baseado em Histórias Reais)	Lucas Souza	23	Digital Influencer	Passos	Walked: Day 67	14th
15 (Baseado em Histórias Reais)	Alicia X	23	Actress & Singer	Taboão da Serra	Evicted: Day 68	13th
15 (Baseado em Histórias Reais)	Kally Fonseca	30	Singer	Natal	Evicted: Day 75	12th
15 (Baseado em Histórias Reais)	Yuri Meirelles	22	Model	Rio de Janeiro	Evicted: Day 82	11th
15 (Baseado em Histórias Reais)	Radamés Furlan	37	Football Player	Rio de Janeiro	Evicted: Day 89	10th
15 (Baseado em Histórias Reais)	Cezar Black	35	Nurse & Digital Influencer	Salvador	Evicted: Day 89	9th
15 (Baseado em Histórias Reais)	Shayan Haghbin	32	Digital Influencer	Tehran, Iran	Evicted: Day 91	8th
15 (Baseado em Histórias Reais)	Nadja Pessoa	35	Businesswoman	Recife	Evicted: Day 91	7th
15 (Baseado em Histórias Reais)	Lily Nobre	21	Singer	Rio de Janeiro	Evicted: Day 94	6th
15 (Baseado em Histórias Reais)	Tonzão Chagas	35	Singer	Rio de Janeiro	Evicted: Day 94	5th
15 (Baseado em Histórias Reais)	WL Guimarães	24	Digital Influencer	Duque de Caxias	Finalist: Day 96	4th
15 (Baseado em Histórias Reais)	Márcia Fu	54	Former Volleyball Player	Juiz de Fora	Finalist: Day 96	3rd
15 (Baseado em Histórias Reais)	André Gonçalves	47	Actor	Rio de Janeiro	Finalist: Day 96	Runner-up
15 (Baseado em Histórias Reais)	Jaquelline Grohalski	29	Model	Rolim de Moura	Finalist: Day 96	Winner
16
16	Vivi Fernandez	46	Actress	Brasília	Evicted: Day 12	24th
16	Larissa Tomásia	28	Digital Influencer	Limoeiro	Evicted: Day 19	23rd
16	Raquel Brito	23	Manicurist & Digital Influencer	Salvador	Evacuated: Day 22	22nd
16	Cauê Fantin	26	Actor & Producer	Itapecerica da Serra	Evicted: Day 26	21st
16	Suelen Gervásio	28	Model & Digital Influencer	Rio de Janeiro	Evicted: Day 33	20th
16	Julia Simoura	20	Actress	Belo Horizonte	Evicted: Day 40	19th
16	Zaac	31	Singer	Diadema	Walked: Day 43	18th
16	Fernanda Campos	27	Model & Digital Influencer	Carmo do Rio Claro	Walked: Day 43	17th
16	Camila Moura	30	Teacher	Rio de Janeiro	Evicted: Day 47	16th
16	Zé Love	36	Former Football Player	Promissão	Evicted: Day 54	15th
16	Gizelly Bicalho	33	Lawyer	Iúna	Evicted: Day 61	14th
16	Babi Muniz	34	Former Panicat	São Paulo	Evicted: Day 68	13th
16	Fernando Presto	38	Chef & Artisan	Mogi das Cruzes	Evicted: Day 75	12th
16	Flora Cruz	21	Digital Influencer	Rio de Janeiro	Evicted: Day 82	11th
16	Luana Targinno	27	Digital Influencer	Recife	Evicted: Day 89	10th
16	Flor Fernandez	60	TV Host	São Caetano do Sul	Evicted: Day 89	9th
16	Albert Bressan	54	Businessman	Ribeirão Pires	Evicted: Day 92	8th
16	Gilson de Oliveira	42	Personal Trainer	Rio de Janeiro	Evicted: Day 93	7th
16	Vanessa Carvalho	35	Actress & Digital Influencer	Teófilo Otoni	Evicted: Day 94	6th
16	Juninho Bill	47	Singer & Producer	Guarulhos	Evicted: Day 94	5th
16	Gui Vieira	21	Actor & Model	São Paulo	Finalist: Day 96	4th
16	Yuri Bonotto	34	Model & Digital Influencer	Porto Alegre	Finalist: Day 96	3rd
16	Sidney Sampaio	44	Actor & TV Host	Lucélia	Finalist: Day 96	Runner-up
16	Sacha Bali	43	Actor & Director	Rio de Janeiro	Finalist: Day 96	Winner
