= Vivi Fernandez =

Brazilian adult actress and model

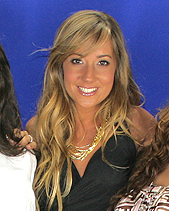
- Born: Viviane Moreira Fernandes; 29 September 1977 (age 48); Brasília, DF, Brazil
- Occupation(s): Actress, model, dancer, adult actress

Viviane Moreira Fernandes (born 29 September 1977), best known as Vivi Fernandez, is a Brazilian model, actress, dancer and former adult actress.

== Life and career ==
Born in Brasília, Distrito Federal, the daughter of a retired soldier, Fernandes finished high school and then started a course for dental technician that later ended up to become a model. After taking part at the Rede Record show Galera, Fernandes gained notoriety by participating as a dancer to the comedy show Festa do Mallandro hosted by Sérgio Mallandro on TV Gazeta. In 1999 she sued Mallandro for sexual harassment, assault, threat and duress arguing that these events occurred during the time of the show.

Between 2003 and 2004, Fernandes became known for a series of artistic nudes, some of them made for the magazine Sexy Premium. In 2005, became an adult actress, signing an exclusive contract with producer Brasileirinhas; her first film, Vivi.com.vc, broke sales records and was praised on specialized sites. She appeared in explicit sex scenes with her boyfriend of the time, businessman Mark Hugo. In 2009, Vivi Fernandez did another artistic nude, this time for a special edition of Playboy magazine.

Fernandez also acted as comedian in TV-programs such as A Praça é Nossa and Sem Controle (both broadcast by SBT), and starred pranks of the show Programa Sílvio Santos (also SBT). After retiring from adult industry in 2009, she also acted on stage, starring in the comedy plays Tudo em Cima da Cama and A Segunda Dama.
