= Rosiane Pinheiro =

Brazilian model (born 1974)

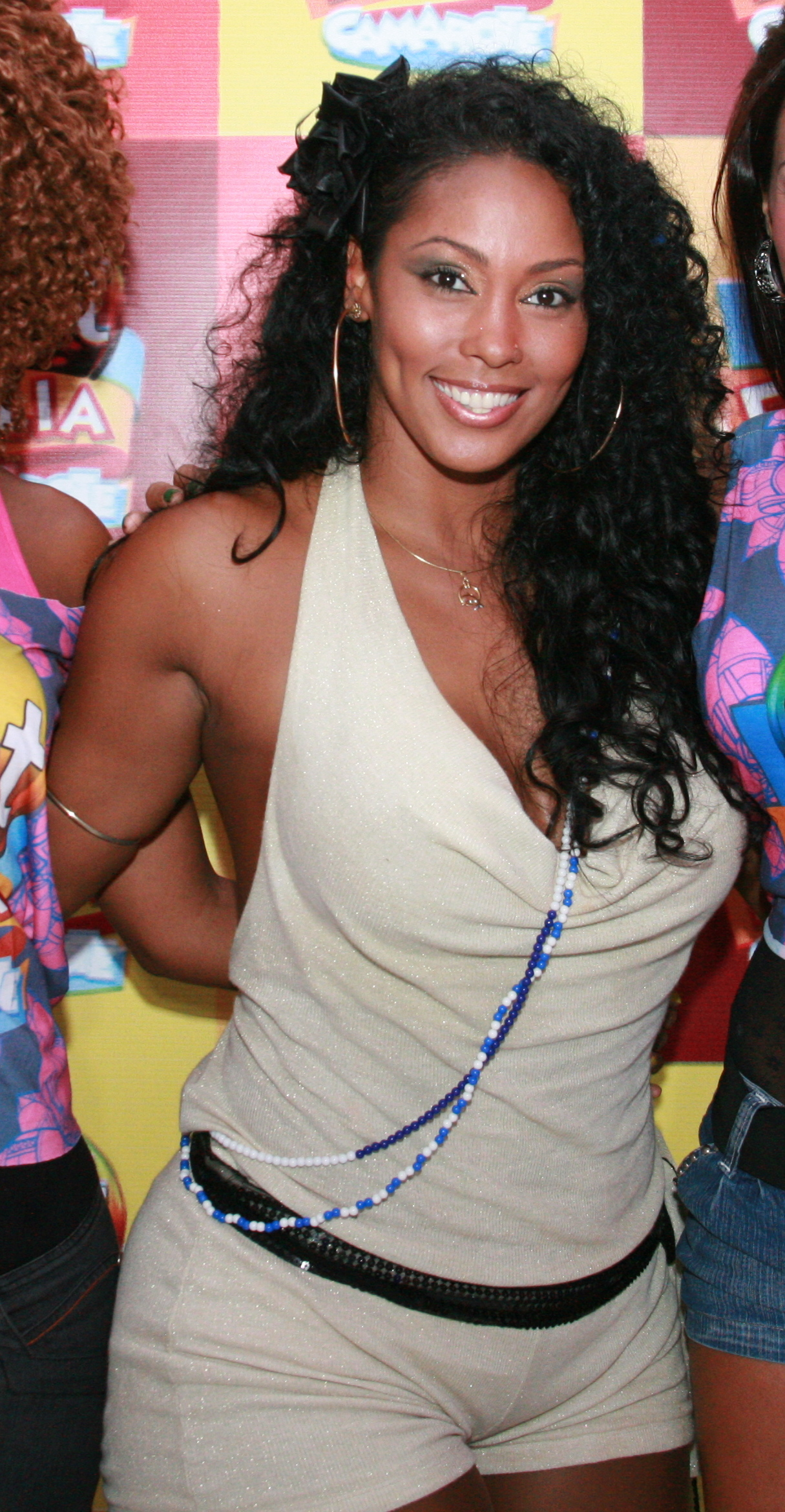
- Rosiane in 2012
- Born: Rosiane de Souza Pinheiro; 19 July 1974 (age 51); São Gonçalo, Rio de Janeiro, Brazil
- Occupations: dancer; model; actress; television presenter

Rosiane de Souza Pinheiro (born 19 July 1974) is a Brazilian dancer, model, actress, media personality and a sex symbol. She rose to prominence as a dancer for the music band Gang do Sambaand in the 1990s and has gone on to appear in numerous magazine photo shoots, including on the cover for the Brazilian Playboy in June 1998. Rosiane has also acted in numerous television series, TV commercials and in few films.

== Career ==
Rosiane joined the Bahian music group Gang do Samba, in early 1990s and became its major highlight. She participated for several years in the carnivals of Rio de Janeiro, Salvador and São Paulo with them, until her departure from the group in 2004. In 1997, she became the finalist in the "Morena do Tchan" contest, on the TV program Domingão do Faustão. In 1998, she won a poll made with the players of the Brazilian national football team to be featured on the cover of the Playboy magazine, becoming the third black woman to appear on the cover of the publisher. She appeared topless, wearing only panties stamped with the Brazilian flag. Rosiane eventually became a popular Brazilian sex symbol during that time. In 2008, she was listed by the VIP magazine in a poll of the 100 sexiest women in the world.

Rosiane participated in the reality show O Trio Reality on in 2012, where she became the winner. Later, she joined the reporter team for the show Universo Axé, where she stayed until the end of 2016. At the beginning of 2018, Rosiane returned to Gang do Samba and stayed in the band until June 2022. Later that year, she participated in the fourteenth edition of the reality show A Fazenda.
