= Andressa Urach =

Brazilian television personality (born 1987)

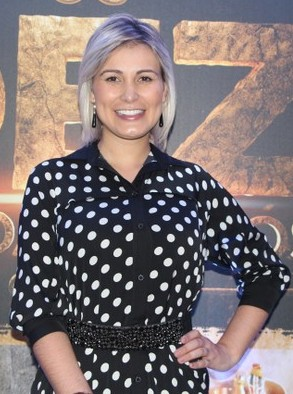
- Urach in 2016
- Born: 11 October 1987 (age 39); Ijuí, Rio Grande do Sul, Brazil
- Occupations: Television personality and porn actress
- Television: A Fazenda 6 (7th place)
- Height: 1.71 m (5 ft 7 1/2 in)
- Children: 2

Andressa de Faveri Urach (born 11 October 1987) is a Brazilian reality television personality and porn actress, best known for being a contestant on the sixth season of A Fazenda, the Brazilian version of The Farm.

== Career ==
Born in Ijuí, in the countryside of Rio Grande do Sul state, Urach graduated in business administration at the conclusion of her education, but chose a career as a model and dancer. In 2011, she represented the football club Internacional de Porto Alegre in the "Musa do Brasileirão" contest, organised by Globo Esporte, Rede Globo's sporting branch. In 2011, she started as a dancer of Legendários, at Rede Record. She found fame as a dancer for singer Latino but decided to stop being a "Latinete" (as the singer's dancers are called) to dedicate herself to other professional projects.

In 2012, Urach did a glamour photo shoot for Globo's Paparazzo website. She made her first naked appearance for Sexy magazine in April. In the same year, Urach participated in the Miss Bumbum contest and finished as runner up, losing to Carine Felizardo. Also, she was considered one of the muses of the 2012 Summer Olympics.

In 2013, she again featured on the cover of Sexy (in September) and was involved in a controversy with Portuguese football player Cristiano Ronaldo, and after that she adopted the pseudonym Imola, justifying it as "the curves where the best of the world got lost", referencing the Italian city where death of Aryton Senna occurred and the football player. Soon after, she was one of the participants on the sixth season of the reality show A Fazenda, the Brazilian version of The Farm, finishing in seventh place in the competition. In 2014, Spanish newspaper El Diario published a story about Urach and emphasised her title of Miss Butt and considered her the muse of the 2014 FIFA World Cup.

Between 2012 and 2014, Urach hosted the variety television show Muito Show on Brazilian station RedeTV!

== Personal life ==
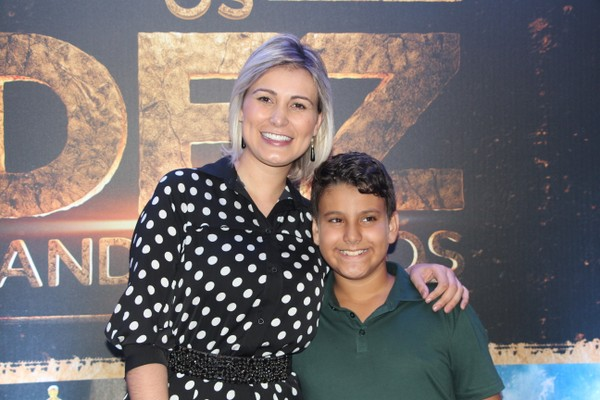
Urach with her son in 2016

In 2013, she said she is bisexual. On 29 November 2014, Urach was hospitalised in critical condition in the ICU of a Porto Alegre hospital due to a generalised infection that resulted from large quantities of silicone she had implanted in her thighs to make them thicker for show business appearances. On 1 January 2015, the Brazilian news site UOL reported she had been released from the hospital after 25 days.

In January 2016, Urach stated in an interview that she was now a born again Protestant and Igreja Universal do Reino de Deus follower. She published a book titled Morri para Viver – Meu submundo de fama, drogas e prostituição ("I died so I could live – My underworld of fame, drugs and prostitution"), and she said she was dedicated to regaining the love and respect of her then-11-year-old son, Arthur.

Urach is active on OnlyFans. She was criticized after it was revealed that her 18-year-old son was filming her adult content for the platform.

== A Fazenda ==
On 23 June 2013, Urach was officially announced by host Britto Júnior as one of the sixteen celebrity contestants on the sixth season of A Fazenda, the Brazilian version of reality series The Farm, which aired on Rede Record.

During the performance on the show, Urach equalled the record for most times being the Farmer of the Week, which is three times in a single series. This record is also held by Sérgio Abreu, the runner-up of the third season, and Joana Machado, the winner of the fourth season. Urach is also tied with fifth season competitor Robertha Portella for the longest period without going to a hot seat in the show, 12 weeks; both were also eliminated from the show the first time they were put in the hot seat.

On 15 September 2013, after 85 days, Urach was finally evicted from the show in a contest with the eventual winner Bárbara Evans and runner-up Denise Rocha, finishing in seventh place overall in the competition.

Urach is considered one of the most controversial contestants in the show's history, along with first season contestant Théo Becker and fifth season contestants Nicole Bahls and Gretchen, and along with her fellow competitors from the same season Denise Rocha and Lu Schievano.

Week	Status	Results
1	Nominee	Saved
2	Farmer of the Week	(none)
3	Regular	(Immune)
4	Regular	Voted with the majority
5	Nominee	Voted with the majority
6	Nominee	Saved (Banned)
7	Farmer of the Week	(none)
8	Nominee	Saved
9	Farmer of the Week	(none)
10	Exempt	Saved
11	Winner of the Power Key	(Immune)
12	Nominee	Evicted (Final 7)

== Filmography ==
Television
Year	Title	Role	Television network
2013	A Fazenda 6	Contestant	Rede Record
2014	Muito Show	Co-host	RedeTV!
