= Valesca Popozuda =

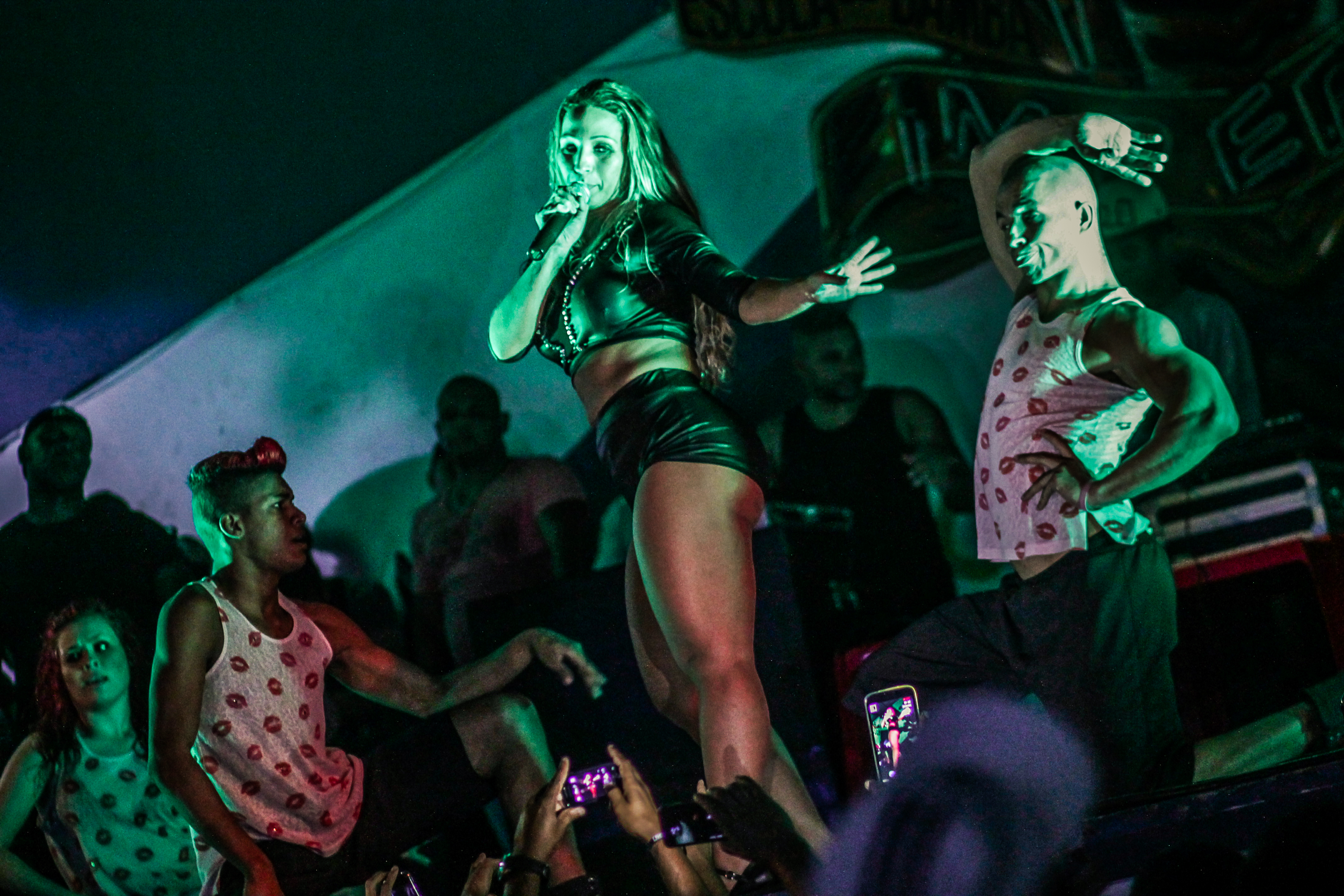
- Valesca Popozuda in 2014

Background information
- Born: Valesca Reis Santos; October 6, 1978 (age 47); Rio de Janeiro, Brazil
- Genres: Funk carioca, pop
- Years active: 2000–present
- Website: valescapopozuda.blogspot.com

Valesca Reis Santos, better known as Valesca Popozuda (born October 6, 1978) is a Brazilian singer, dancer and former reality show contestant. She was the lead singer for the Brazilian funk carioca band Gaiola das Popozudas. Her stage name is Brazilian Portuguese for "Big-butted Valesca".

== Biography ==
Valesca was born on October 6, 1978, in the Irajá neighborhood, in Rio de Janeiro, Rio de Janeiro, Brazil. She has a son called Pablo (born in 1999) and currently lives in her birth city.

=== Career ===
She is a founding member of the Brazilian funk carioca group Gaiola das Popozudas, which was created in the beginning of the 2000s (decade), whose most famous songs include "Late que eu tô passando" (Bark Because I'm Passing by), "Agora eu tô solteira" (Now I'm Single) and its uncensored version, "Agora eu virei puta" (Now I've Become a whore), and "Quero te dar" (I Want to give 'it' to you). Valesca is noted for her slightly hoarse voice, for her irreverence and large buttocks (which are insured for R$5.000.000, have 550ml silicone implants in each side and are big enough to balance a glass). She was the June 2009 Playmate of the Brazilian Playboy. In 2011, she participated in the fourth edition of the Brazilian reality show A Fazenda, where she finished 4th. Valesca got along with everyone in the house, and was too welcomed by public due to, along with Raquel Pacheco, Monique Evans and Joana Machado (the final three of the show), taking part of the most popular alliance from that season.

Valesca, an admirer of the president Lula, has written a song dedicated to him, which includes a controversial statement: "conheci o Lula no Complexo do Alemão, e ele não tirou o olho do meu popozão", Brazilian Portuguese for "I met Lula at Complexo do Alemão and he didn't stop staring at my big ass".

== Personal life ==
In 2022, Valesca came out as bisexual in a podcast.
