= Daniel Bueno =

Daniel Bueno may refer to:

- Daniel Bueno (model) (born 1977), Brazilian model and television personality
- Daniel Bueno (footballer) (born 1983), Brazilian footballer
