= Denise Rocha =

Brazilian model, lawyer and former parliamentary adviser

- Born: Denise Leitão Rocha; December 5, 1983 (age 42); Brasília, DF, Brazil
- Television: A Fazenda 6 (runner-up)

Denise Rocha (born Denise Leitão Rocha; December 5, 1983) is a Brazilian model, lawyer, and a former parliamentary adviser, best known for coming in second place on the sixth season of the A Fazenda a reality show broadcast by Rede Record in 2013. She made the cover of Playboy Magazine in 2012.

== Career as lawyer ==
Rocha worked until January 2011 at the office of a Federal senator, CIRO NOGUEIRA. Her task was to monitor the progress of the committees coordinated by Senator Ciro Nogueira, such as the Parliamentary Enquiry Commission (CPI) for the Cachoeira case.

She was separated from her commissioned position as a parliamentary adviser with the office of Senator Nogueira (PP-PI). Rocha became the center of attention in Congress after the leak of a video that shows her having sex with a man, a video made six years earlier.

== Career as a model ==
Rocha was selected for the cover of Playboy Magazine for the September 2012 issue, and she was the muse of samba school Mocidade Independente de Padre Miguel in 2013, during Brazilian Carnaval. Soon after, she was invited to join the cast of the sixth season of the A Fazenda.

== A Fazenda ==
On Jun 23, 2013, Rocha was officially announced by host Britto Junior as one of the sixteen celebrity contestants who would be on the sixth season of A Fazenda, the Brazilian version of the reality series The Farm, which aired on Rede Record.

On September 29, 2013, after 100 days of confinement, she was runner-up to Bárbara Evans who won season six of that reality show, with 54.87% of the vote and who took home the grand prize of 2 million reais. Rocha as second-place finish, with 41.28%, won her a brand new car. Marcos Oliver finished in third place with 3.85% of the vote.

Trivia

- She is one among four participants, and the three women to be nominated in the first week and reach the final two, with the other being Sergio Abreu of the A Fazenda 3 e Ana Paula Minerato A Fazenda 8. Both finished as runners-up, whereas Viviane Araújo finished the winner of the season she participated A Fazenda 5.
- She won the last challenge of the Farmer of the week who competed in the season.
