= A Fazenda 6 =

Season of television series

- Season 6
- Hosted by: Britto Júnior
- No. of days: 100
- No. of contestants: 16
- Winner: Bárbara Evans
- Runner-up: Denise Rocha
- Companion show: A Fazenda Online
- No. of episodes: 97

Release
- Original network: RecordTV
- Original release: June 23 – September 29, 2013

Series chronology
- ← Previous; A Fazenda 5 Next → A Fazenda 7

A Fazenda 6 was the sixth season of the Brazilian reality television series A Fazenda, which premiered on Sunday, June 23, 2013, on RecordTV. It was hosted by Britto Júnior and reports by Juliana Camargo.

The season was officially confirmed since 2011 as part of a millionaire contract between Strix Television and RecordTV, which guaranteed seasons until 2019. A Fazenda 6 was officially confirmed on August 29, 2012, during the season finale of A Fazenda 5.

Britto Junior reprised his hosting stints for the show. Cris Couto was replaced by journalist Juliana Camargo as the sponsored competitions host. Gianne Albertoni made her debut as the show's new commander on A Fazenda Online.

The grand prize was of R$ 2 million without tax allowances, with a brand new car offered to the runner-up.

On September 29, 2013, 22-year-old model Bárbara Evans won the competition with 54.87% of the public vote over lawyer Denise Rocha (41.28%) and actor Marcos Oliver (3.85%).

== Production ==
=== Overview ===
Pre-production started in February 2013. Record began casting for A Fazenda 6 once filming for Fazenda de Verão (Summer Farm) was completed.

=== Cast ===
The season featured sixteen new celebrities. Among them are three celebrities who are relatives of past contestants: Bárbara Evans is the daughter of TV host Monique Evans (from seasons 3 and 4), Mateus Verdelho is the ex-husband of model Dani Bolina (from season 4) and Márcio Duarte is the twin brother of singer Vavá (from season 5).

== Contestants ==
Biographical information according to Record official series site, plus footnoted additions.
(ages stated are at time of contest)

| Contestant | Age | Background | Hometown | Week 1 team | Week 2 team | Week 10 team | Merged team | Status | Finish |
|---|---|---|---|---|---|---|---|---|---|
| Márcio Duarte | 39 | Singer | Santos | Sheep | | | | Eliminated 1st on July 2, 2013 | 16th |
| Lu Schievano | 38 | Singer & actress | São Paulo | Rabbit | Rabbit | | | Eliminated 2nd on July 9, 2013 | 15th |
| Aryane Steinkopf | 25 | Model | Vila Velha | Ostrich | Ostrich | | | Eliminated 3rd on July 16, 2013 | 14th |
| Rita Cadillac | 59 | Singer & dancer | Rio de Janeiro | Ostrich | Ostrich | | | Eliminated 4th on July 23, 2013 | 13th |
| Ivo Meirelles | 51 | Musician | Rio de Janeiro | Sheep | Sheep | | | Eliminated 5th on August 6, 2013 | 12th |
| Scheila Carvalho | 39 | TV host | Juiz de Fora | Rabbit | Rabbit | | | Eliminated 6th on August 13, 2013 | 11th |
| Paulo Nunes | 41 | Former football player | Pontalina | Rabbit | Rabbit | | | Eliminated 7th on August 27, 2013 | 10th |
| Beto Malfacini | 31 | International model | Rio de Janeiro | Ostrich | Ostrich | No Team | | Eliminated 8th on September 3, 2013 | 9th |
| Yudi Tamashiro | 20 | TV host & singer | Santos | Ostrich | Ostrich | No Team | Final eight | Eliminated 9th on September 10, 2013 | 8th |
| Andressa Urach | 25 | Media personality | Porto Alegre | Rabbit | Sheep | Sheep | Final eight | Eliminated 10th on September 15, 2013 | 7th |
| Yani de Simone | 24 | Singer | Rio de Janeiro | No Team | Rabbit | No Team | Final eight | Eliminated 11th on September 21, 2013 | 6th |
| Gominho | 24 | Reporter | Rio de Janeiro | Sheep | Sheep | Sheep | Final eight | Eliminated 12th on September 25, 2013 | 5th |
| Mateus Verdelho | 30 | Model & DJ | São Paulo | Ostrich | Ostrich | No Team | Final eight | Eliminated 13th on September 26, 2013 | 4th |
| Marcos Oliver | 37 | Actor | Taubaté | Rabbit | Rabbit | No Team | Final eight | Third place on September 29, 2013 | 3rd |
| Denise Rocha | 29 | Lawyer | Brasília | Sheep | Sheep | Sheep | Final eight | Runner-up on September 29, 2013 | 2nd |
| Bárbara Evans | 22 | Model | Rio de Janeiro | Sheep | Sheep | Sheep | Final eight | Winner on September 29, 2013 | 1st |

== Future appearances ==
In 2016, Scheila Carvalho appeared in Saltibum 3, she finished as runner-up.

In 2017, Rita Cadillac returned to compete in A Fazenda 9, she finished in 5th place in the competition.

In 2017, Yudi Tamashiro appeared in Dancing Brasil 2, he won the competition.

In 2018, Bárbara Evans appeared in Dancing Brasil 3, she finished in 13th place in the competition.

In 2023, Marcos Oliver appeared on A Grande Conquista 1, he have to compete for a place to enter in the game and he didn't enter.

== The game ==
=== Key Power ===
Since Season 5, contestants compete to win the Key Power each week. The Key Power holder is the only contestant who can open the mystery box located at the Farm. However, opening the box will unleash either a good consequence or a bad consequence at the nomination process. The Key Holder's choice is marked in bold.

From week 10, sheep team for being the team with the most members to date, won a box with a lot of instructions. The instructions are being revealed during this week.

Results

| Week | Players | Winner | Sent to the Barn | Consequences |
|---|---|---|---|---|
| 1 | Lu | **Marcos** | (none) | Marcos had 2 instructions.: The top 3 in this challenge won immunity.; Having won, Marcos became one of the three finalists. |
| 1 | Marcos | **Marcos** | (none) | Marcos had 2 instructions.: The top 3 in this challenge won immunity.; Having won, Marcos became one of the three finalists. |
| 1 | Scheila | **Marcos** | (none) | Marcos had 2 instructions.: The top 3 in this challenge won immunity.; Having won, Marcos became one of the three finalists. |
| 2 | Mateus | **Marcos** | Team Ostrich: Aryane, Beto, Mateus, Rita, Yudi | Marcos had 1 instruction and 2 options: His team should choose someone from the barn to be nominated.; Choose between win immunity or **win R$10**,**000**. |
| 2 | Marcos | **Marcos** | Team Ostrich: Aryane, Beto, Mateus, Rita, Yudi | Marcos had 1 instruction and 2 options: His team should choose someone from the barn to be nominated.; Choose between win immunity or **win R$10**,**000**. |
| 2 | Ivo | **Marcos** | Team Ostrich: Aryane, Beto, Mateus, Rita, Yudi | Marcos had 1 instruction and 2 options: His team should choose someone from the barn to be nominated.; Choose between win immunity or **win R$10**,**000**. |
| 3 | Beto | **Beto** | Team Rabbit: Marcos, Paulo, Scheila, Yani | Beto had 2 instructions: Beto and the team he did not send to the barn (Sheep) were immune.; Team Rabbit cannot compete for next week's Key Power. |
| 3 | Scheila | **Beto** | Team Rabbit: Marcos, Paulo, Scheila, Yani | Beto had 2 instructions: Beto and the team he did not send to the barn (Sheep) were immune.; Team Rabbit cannot compete for next week's Key Power. |
| 3 | Andressa | **Beto** | Team Rabbit: Marcos, Paulo, Scheila, Yani | Beto had 2 instructions: Beto and the team he did not send to the barn (Sheep) were immune.; Team Rabbit cannot compete for next week's Key Power. |
| 4 | Mateus | **Mateus** | Team Rabbit: Marcos, Scheila, Yani | Mateus had 2 instructions: Mateus is immune and has to ban someone from his team from nominating.; Team Rabbit is the only team allowed to compete for next week's Key Power. |
| 4 | Ivo | **Mateus** | Team Rabbit: Marcos, Scheila, Yani | Mateus had 2 instructions: Mateus is immune and has to ban someone from his team from nominating.; Team Rabbit is the only team allowed to compete for next week's Key Power. |
| 5 | Rabbit team | **Scheila** | Team Ostrich: Beto, Mateus, Yudi | Scheila had 2 instructions: Ostrich should decide as a group the first nominee between themselves.; This week's eviction was cancelled (the twist was revealed after the vote). |
| 6 | Yudi | **Yudi** | Team Sheep: Andressa, Bárbara, Denise, Gominho, Ivo | Yudi had 2 options and 1 instruction: Choose between **win immunity** or letters from home for his whole team.; Ban two contestants from the team in the barn (Sheep) from nominating. |
| 6 | Paulo | **Yudi** | Team Sheep: Andressa, Bárbara, Denise, Gominho, Ivo | Yudi had 2 options and 1 instruction: Choose between **win immunity** or letters from home for his whole team.; Ban two contestants from the team in the barn (Sheep) from nominating. |
| 6 | Bárbara | **Yudi** | Team Sheep: Andressa, Bárbara, Denise, Gominho, Ivo | Yudi had 2 options and 1 instruction: Choose between **win immunity** or letters from home for his whole team.; Ban two contestants from the team in the barn (Sheep) from nominating. |
| 7 | Beto | **Beto** | Team Rabbit: Marcos, Paulo, Scheila, Yani | Beto had 2 instructions: Beto is immune.; Choose one contestant from the barn (team Rabbit) to be the first nominee. |
| 7 | Marcos | **Beto** | Team Rabbit: Marcos, Paulo, Scheila, Yani | Beto had 2 instructions: Beto is immune.; Choose one contestant from the barn (team Rabbit) to be the first nominee. |
| 7 | Gominho | **Beto** | Team Rabbit: Marcos, Paulo, Scheila, Yani | Beto had 2 instructions: Beto is immune.; Choose one contestant from the barn (team Rabbit) to be the first nominee. |
| 8 | Yudi | **Yudi** | Team Sheep: Andressa, Bárbara, Denise, Gominho | Beto had 2 instructions and 2 options: Yudi is immune. Team Sheep cannot compete for next week's Key Power.; Choose win a R50.000 car and be nominated or **nominate another person**. |
| 8 | Paulo | **Yudi** | Team Sheep: Andressa, Bárbara, Denise, Gominho | Beto had 2 instructions and 2 options: Yudi is immune. Team Sheep cannot compete for next week's Key Power.; Choose win a R50.000 car and be nominated or **nominate another person**. |
| 8 | Bárbara | **Yudi** | Team Sheep: Andressa, Bárbara, Denise, Gominho | Beto had 2 instructions and 2 options: Yudi is immune. Team Sheep cannot compete for next week's Key Power.; Choose win a R50.000 car and be nominated or **nominate another person**. |
| 9 | Mateus | **Mateus** | Denise, Yani (fewest votes to save) | Mateus had 1 instruction: Save one of three nominees, thus chose the next Farmer of the Week: (**Beto**, Denise or Paulo). |
| 9 | Marcos | **Mateus** | Denise, Yani (fewest votes to save) | Mateus had 1 instruction: Save one of three nominees, thus chose the next Farmer of the Week: (**Beto**, Denise or Paulo). |
| 10 | Yudi | **Andressa** | (none) | Andressa had 3 instructions: The team with more members at this point of the game is immune (Sheep).; Choose 2 members from Sheep that the house would vote the next farmer: (Bárbara, Gominho); Won R$10,000. |
| 10 | Yani | **Andressa** | (none) | Andressa had 3 instructions: The team with more members at this point of the game is immune (Sheep).; Choose 2 members from Sheep that the house would vote the next farmer: (Bárbara, Gominho); Won R$10,000. |
| 10 | Andressa | **Andressa** | (none) | Andressa had 3 instructions: The team with more members at this point of the game is immune (Sheep).; Choose 2 members from Sheep that the house would vote the next farmer: (Bárbara, Gominho); Won R$10,000. |
| 10–11 | (none) | **Sheep** **team** | Denise, Marcos (fired by Gominho on O Aprendiz spoof task) | Each team sheep member had their own envelope (chose by themselves): 1 − Andressa: Choose **win immunity** or give immunity; 2 − Denise: Ban one person from nominating (Marcos); 3 − Gominho: Replace one nominee (Yani with Mateus); 4 − Bárbara: Ban one nominee to compete for Farmer (Yudi). |

== Voting history ==
| | Week 1 | Week 2 | Week 3 | Week 4 | Week 5 | Week 6 | Week 7 | Week 8 | Week 9 | Week 10 | Week 11 | Week 12 | Week 13 | Week 14 | | |
| | Week 1 | Week 2 | Week 3 | Week 4 | Week 5 | Week 6 | Week 7 | Week 8 | Week 9 | Week 10 | Week 11 | Week 12 | Week 13 | Day 94 | Day 96 | Finale |
|---|---|---|---|---|---|---|---|---|---|---|---|---|---|---|---|---|
| Farmer of the Week | (none) | Andressa | Ivo | Paulo | Scheila | Beto | Andressa | Mateus | Andressa | Beto | Gominho | Mateus | Denise | (none) | | |
| Nominated (Farmer) | (none) | Ivo | Aryane | Gominho | Andressa | Andressa | Bárbara | Andressa | Beto | (none) | Yudi | Andressa | Yani | (none) | | |
| Nominated (House) | Denise | Lu | Paulo | Rita | Denise | Denise | Mateus | Bárbara | Paulo | (none) | Denise | Denise | (none) | (none) | | |
| Nominated (Twist) | Andressa; Márcio | Aryane | Yudi | Scheila | Beto | Ivo | Scheila | Denise; Yani | Denise; ~~Yani~~ | Beto; Mateus | Mateus | Bárbara | Bárbara; Gominho | (none) | | |
| Bárbara | Denise | Lu | Paulo | Rita | Denise | Ivo | Denise | Denise | Paulo | Exempt | Yani | Yani | Nominee | Nominee | Nominee | Winner (Day 100) |
| Denise | Ivo | Paulo | Yudi | Rita | Yudi | Banned | Mateus | Bárbara | Mateus | Exempt | Yani | Yani | Farmer of the Week | Nominee | Nominee | Runner-up (Day 100) |
| Marcos | Gominho | Yudi | Mateus | Ivo | Mateus | Ivo | Mateus | Bárbara | Yudi | Exempt | Exempt | Denise | Exempt | Exempt | Exempt | Third place (Day 100) |
| Mateus | Denise | Lu | Yani | Denise | Denise | Denise | Denise | Farmer of the Week | Paulo | Nominee | Denise | Farmer of the Week | Saved | Saved | Nominee | Evicted (Day 97) |
| Gominho | Andressa | Lu | Paulo | Yudi | Paulo | Paulo | Paulo | Beto | Paulo | Exempt | Farmer of the Week | Denise | Nominee | Nominee | Evicted (Day 96) | |
| Yani | Denise | Lu | Mateus | Beto | Denise | Ivo | Mateus | Bárbara | Mateus | Saved | Denise | Denise | Nominee | Evicted (Day 92) | | |
| Andressa | Ivo | Farmer of the Week | Paulo | Rita | Denise | Banned | Farmer of the Week | Bárbara | Farmer of the Week | Exempt | Bárbara | Denise | Evicted (Day 86) | | | |
| Yudi | Denise | Lu | Scheila | Denise | Denise | Denise | Denise | Denise | Paulo | Saved | Denise | Evicted (Day 81) | | | | |
| Beto | Denise | Lu | Yani | Yani | Denise | Denise | Denise | Denise | Paulo | Nominee | Evicted (Day 74) | | | | | |
| Paulo | Denise | Lu | Rita | Farmer of the Week | Denise | Denise | Mateus | Bárbara | Gominho | Evicted (Day 67) | | | | | | |
| Scheila | Mateus | Lu | Yudi | Bárbara | Farmer of the Week | Ivo | Mateus | Evicted (Day 53) | | | | | | | | |
| Ivo | Andressa | Lu | Farmer of the Week | Rita | Denise | Denise | Evicted (Day 46) | | | | | | | | | |
| Rita | Márcio | Lu | Paulo | Banned | Evicted (Day 32) | | | | | | | | | | | |
| Aryane | Ivo | Lu | Paulo | Evicted (Day 25) | | | | | | | | | | | | |
| Lu | Ivo | Rita | Evicted (Day 18) | | | | | | | | | | | | | |
| Márcio | Yani | Evicted (Day 11) | | | | | | | | | | | | | | |
| Notes | 1, 2, 3 | 4 | 5, 6 | 7, 8 | 9, 10 | 11, 12, 13 | 14 | 15 | 16 | 17, 18 | 19, 20, 21 | 22 | 23 | 24 | 25, 26, 27 | (none) |
| Up for Nomination | Andressa; Denise; Márcio | Aryane; Ivo; Lu | Aryane; Paulo; Yudi | Gominho; Rita; Scheila | Andressa; Beto; Denise | Andressa; Denise; Ivo | Bárbara; Mateus; Scheila | Andressa; Bárbara; Denise; Yani | Beto; Denise; Paulo | (none) | Denise; Mateus; Yudi | (none) | | | | |
| Saved | Andressa | Ivo | Paulo | Scheila | (none) | Andressa | Mateus | Andressa | Beto | (none) | Mateus | (none) | | | | |
| Nominated for Eviction | Denise; Márcio | Aryane; Lu | Aryane; Yudi | Gominho; Rita | (none) | Denise; Ivo | Bárbara; Scheila | Bárbara; Denise; Yani | Denise; Paulo | Beto; Mateus | Denise; Yudi | Andressa; Bárbara; Denise | Bárbara; Gominho; Yani | Bárbara; Denise; Gominho | Bárbara; Denise; Mateus | Bárbara; Denise; Marcos |
| Evicted | Márcio; 48% to save | Lu; 31% to save | Aryane; 48% to save | Rita; 49.38% to save | Eviction cancelled | Ivo; 33% to save | Scheila; 35% to save | Denise; 45% to save | Paulo; 41% to save | Beto; 38% to save | Yudi; 41% to save | Andressa; 10% to save | Yani; 10% to save | Gominho; 13.80% to save | Mateus; 26% to save | Marcos; 3.85% to win |
| Evicted | Márcio; 48% to save | Lu; 31% to save | Aryane; 48% to save | Rita; 49.38% to save | Eviction cancelled | Ivo; 33% to save | Scheila; 35% to save | Denise; 45% to save | Paulo; 41% to save | Beto; 38% to save | Yudi; 41% to save | Andressa; 10% to save | Yani; 10% to save | Gominho; 13.80% to save | Mateus; 26% to save | Denise; 41.28% to win |
| Evicted | Márcio; 48% to save | Lu; 31% to save | Aryane; 48% to save | Rita; 49.38% to save | Eviction cancelled | Ivo; 33% to save | Scheila; 35% to save | Yani; 5% to save | Paulo; 41% to save | Beto; 38% to save | Yudi; 41% to save | Andressa; 10% to save | Yani; 10% to save | Gominho; 13.80% to save | Mateus; 26% to save | Denise; 41.28% to win |
| Evicted | Márcio; 48% to save | Lu; 31% to save | Aryane; 48% to save | Rita; 49.38% to save | Eviction cancelled | Ivo; 33% to save | Scheila; 35% to save | Yani; 5% to save | Paulo; 41% to save | Beto; 38% to save | Yudi; 41% to save | Andressa; 10% to save | Yani; 10% to save | Gominho; 13.80% to save | Mateus; 26% to save | Bárbara; 54.87% to win |

=== Notes ===
- ^Note 1: On Day 1, all contestants competed in a trial. The top three after the trial were revealed as: Beto, Márcio, and Scheila. Beto placed 1st, making him Team Ostrich Captain, Scheila placed 2nd, making her Team Rabbit Captain and Marcio placed 3rd, making him Team Sheep Captain. Yani was not chosen by any group, and was therefore awarded a free pass into the second stage of the Super Key Power Challenge.
- ^Note 2: On Day 3, Team Rabbit (Scheila, Marcos, Lu, Paulo and Andressa) won the first stage of the challenge, which meant they all advanced to the second stage, where they would compete as individuals alongside Yani. On Day 5, the top three (Lu, Marcos and Scheila) advanced to the final stage. At the final stage on Day 7, Marcos won the Super Key Power challenge, guaranteeing himself a place in the final, while Lu and Scheila won immunity from the first eviction.
- ^Note 3: After Denise was nominated by the House's Vote, Yani was asked to choose the second nominee. She chose Andressa and replaced her on Team Rabbit. The eleven remaining eligible contestants were then asked to save one other contestant of their choice. Andressa was asked to start and she saved Bárbara, who saved Gominho, who saved Yani, who saved Paulo, who saved Ivo, who saved Rita, who saved Mateus, who saved Beto, who saved Aryane, who then saved Yudi. This left Márcio as the third nominee for the week.
- ^Note 4: Key Power holder Marcos opened the mystery box, which revealed that his team (Rabbit) should vote for someone from the barn to be the first nominee. Aryane received 2 votes (from Marcos and Paulo), Beto received 1 vote (from Scheila), Mateus received 1 vote (from Yani) and Rita received 1 vote (from Lu), therefore, Aryane was automatically nominated.
- ^Note 5: Key Power holder Beto opened the mystery box, which revealed that he had won immunity. Team Sheep (for not being his team and not having been sent to the barn) also won immunity this week.
- ^Note 6: The five remaining eligible contestants were asked to save one contestant. Paulo, as the second nominee, was asked to start and he saved Scheila, who saved Yani, who saved Rita, who then saved Mateus. This left Yudi as the third nominee for the week.
- ^Note 7: Key Power holder Mateus opened the mystery box, which revealed that he had won immunity and should ban one contestant from his team (Ostrich) from nominating as a result. He chose to ban Rita from nominating this week.
- ^Note 8: The eight remaining eligible contestants were asked to save one contestant. The second nominee Rita was asked to start and she saved Yudi, who saved Beto, who saved Bárbara, who saved Andressa, who saved Ivo, who saved Denise, who then saved Yani. This left Scheila as the third nominee for the week.
- ^Note 9: Key Power holder Scheila opened the mystery box, which revealed that the team she sent to barn (Ostrich) should decide as a group the first nominee between themselves. They decided that Beto would be nominated. The next twist would only be revealed the following day.
- ^Note 10: Right before this week's Farmer competition, Key Power holder Scheila opened the mystery box again, which revealed the second twist of the week: this week's nominations were voided and the eviction was cancelled. The three fake nominees, Scheila and another contestant of her choice (Yani) would compete in two-part Special Farmer competition instead.
- ^Note 11: Key Power holder Yudi opened the mystery box, which revealed that he had to choose between win immunity or letters from home for his whole team. He chose the immunity. Then, he should ban two contestants from team he sent to the barn (Sheep) from nominating. He chose to ban Andressa and Denise from nominating this week.
- ^Note 12: Denise and Ivo received the most nominations with four each. Beto, as Farmer of the Week, had the casting vote and choose Denise to be the second nominee.
- ^Note 13: The seven remaining eligible contestants were asked to save one contestant. The second nominee Denise was asked to start and she saved Scheila, who saved Paulo, who saved Yani, who saved Gominho, who saved Barbara, who saved Mateus. This left Ivo as the third nominee for the week.
- ^Note 14: Key Power holder Beto opened the mystery box, which revealed that he had won immunity and should choose one contestant from the barn (team Rabbit) to be the first nominee. He chose Scheila.
- ^Note 15: Unknown to the contestants, this week's nominations were fake. The four nominees competed for the Farmer of the Week, where Andressa won and save herself so, Bárbara, Denise and Yani were automatically up the public vote. Bárbara received the most votes and won immunity, sending Denise and Yani to the barn, where they would live until the vote.
- ^Note 16: Before the vote took place, host Britto Junior revealed that Denise and Yani were automatically up for nomination. After the vote, the contestants were asked to save one of them. Yani was saved by a unanimous vote (8–0), so Denise still nominated by default.
- ^Note 17: On day 65, host Britto Junior announced that next Farmer of the Week would also be eligible to be nominated.
- ^Note 18: Key Power holder Andressa opened the mystery box, which revealed that the team with more members at this point of the game is immune (Sheep). Since team Sheep (Andressa, Bárbara, Denise and Gominho) is immune and Marcos is already in the final, the four eligible contestants (Beto, Mateus, Yani and Yudi) competed in a nomination challenge. Yudi placed 1st, while Yani placed 2nd, so Mateus (3rd) and Beto (4th) were automatically nominated for eviction by default.
- ^Note 19: The Sheep team holds the Key Power, so each team member had their own envelope (chosen by themselves). Before the vote take place, Andressa won immunity after opening the 1st envelope. After Gominho (Farmer of the Week) automatically nominates Yudi, Denise opened the 2nd envelope and banned Marcos from nominating this round. The remaining twists would only be revealed after the vote.
- ^Note 20: The three eligible contestants were asked to save one contestant. The second nominee Denise was asked to start and she saved Mateus, who saved Bárbara. This left Yani as the third nominee for the week.
- ^Note 21: After the vote, Gominho opened the 3rd envelope and was forced to replace one of the nominees with one eligible contestant (Bárbara or Mateus). He saved Yani and chose Mateus to replace her. Finally, Bárbara opened the 4th and final envelope, that asked her to ban one nominee from competing for the next Farmer. She banned Yudi, so he is automatically up to the public vote.
- ^Note 22: On day 82, the five eligible contestants competed in a special nomination challenge. Yani placed 1st, Andressa placed 2nd, Gominho placed 3rd, Denise placed 4th and Bárbara came in last, therefore, she was automatically up to the public vote.
- ^Note 23: On day 89, the only contestant allowed to vote was the Farmer of the Week Denise, who automatically nominated Yani for eviction. After that, the three eligible contestants competed in a two-part nomination challenge. Bárbara lost the first part and became the second nominee, while Mateus won the second part over Gominho, who became the third and final nominee of the week.
- ^Note 24: On day 93, the four eligible contestants competed in the final nomination challenge. The results were announced live on day 94, where the winner Mateus guaranteed a spot in the final four, while the remaining three (Bárbara, Denise and Gominho) were automatically nominated for eviction.
- ^Note 25: From this point on, there would be no competitions or contestant's vote; public votes alone decide who is evicted and ultimately wins.
- ^Note 26: Following Gominho's eviction on day 96, the three eligible contestants were automatically nominated for the final eviction of the season.
- ^Note 27: Following Mateus's eviction on day 97, the public began to vote for the contestant they want to win A Fazenda 6.

== Ratings and reception ==
=== Brazilian ratings ===
All numbers are in points and provided by Kantar Ibope Media.

| Week | First air date | Last air date | Timeslot (BRT) | Daily SP viewers (in points) | | | | | | | SP viewers (in points) | Source |
| Week | First air date | Last air date | Timeslot (BRT) | Mon | Tue | Wed | Thu | Fri | Sat | Sun | SP viewers (in points) | Source |
|---|---|---|---|---|---|---|---|---|---|---|---|---|
| 0 | June 23, 2013 | June 23, 2013 | Everyday; 11:30 p.m. | — | — | — | — | — | — | 16 | 16 | |
| 1 | June 24, 2013 | June 30, 2013 | Everyday; 11:30 p.m. | 08 | 07 | 09 | 08 | 07 | 10 | 07 | 08 | |
| 2 | July 1, 2013 | June 7, 2013 | Everyday; 11:30 p.m. | 06 | 07 | 08 | 09 | 08 | 10 | 11 | 08 | |
| 3 | July 8, 2013 | June 14, 2013 | Everyday; 11:30 p.m. | 09 | 10 | 07 | 07 | 07 | 08 | 09 | 08 | |
| 4 | July 15, 2013 | June 21, 2013 | Everyday; 11:30 p.m. | 08 | 09 | 09 | 08 | 08 | 09 | 09 | 09 | |
| 5 | July 22, 2013 | June 28, 2013 | Everyday; 11:30 p.m. | 08 | 08 | 06 | 08 | 08 | 09 | 10 | 08 | |
| 6 | July 29, 2013 | August 4, 2013 | Everyday; 11:30 p.m. | 07 | 10 | 11 | 09 | 07 | 09 | 11 | 09 | |
| 7 | August 5, 2013 | August 11, 2013 | Everyday; 11:30 p.m. | 07 | 10 | 09 | 09 | 08 | 10 | 11 | 09 | |
| 8 | August 12, 2013 | August 18, 2013 | Everyday; 11:30 p.m. | 08 | 10 | 10 | 10 | 09 | 10 | 11 | 10 | |
| 9 | August 19, 2013 | August 25, 2013 | Everyday; 11:30 p.m. | 09 | 11 | 10 | 08 | 08 | 11 | 10 | 10 | |
| 10 | August 26, 2013 | September 1, 2013 | Everyday; 11:30 p.m. | 08 | 10 | 10 | 09 | 08 | 09 | 11 | 09 | |
| 11 | September 2, 2013 | September 8, 2013 | Everyday; 11:30 p.m. | 08 | 10 | 10 | 09 | 09 | 08 | 11 | 09 | |
| 12 | September 9, 2013 | September 15, 2013 | Everyday; 11:30 p.m. | 08 | 09 | 10 | 09 | 09 | 08 | 11 | 09 | |
| 13 | September 16, 2013 | September 22, 2013 | Everyday; 11:30 p.m. | 10 | 09 | 09 | 09 | 09 | 08 | 09 | 09 | |
| 14 | September 23, 2013 | September 29, 2013 | Everyday; 11:30 p.m. | 09 | 10 | 10 | 09 | 07 | 08 | 12 | 09 | |

- Each point represents 62.000 households in São Paulo.
