= Humortadela =

- Website type: Comedy
- Available in: Portuguese
- Founded: 1995
- Dissolved: 2016
- Website: www.humortadela.com.br

Humortadela was a Brazilian humor website created on December 3, 1995. Considered a pioneer in its field in Brazil, it ceased operations on May 5, 2011, fifteen years after its launch, but the site became active again on June 29, 2012. The site went offline in 2016. At the time of its closure, it was hosted on UOL. The site, however, published a video titled "The Return of Humor Tadela," stating that it would only return when it reached 100,000 likes on its Facebook page. The site, which was bought by the Brazilian company OraPois, focused on entertainment, returned online on August 20, 2012. Currently, it is deactivated, and most of its animations can be viewed on YouTube.

== History ==
Created in 1995 by Sergio Batista, it was one of the pioneers of internet humor in Brazil, even calling itself the largest site of its kind in Latin America. At its peak in the dot-com bubble, the website had 20 staff in 1999, but when the bubble burst in 2000, it fell down to three.

Some of Humortadela's scriptwriters include Sérgio Batista, Paulo Faiock, Daniel Santos, Tiago Alcântara, Oswaldo Biancardi Filho, Draghixa, Baltazar Paprocki, André Guedes and Wil Vasque. A large part of the drawings and animations are by Baltazar Paprocki, Carlos Otavio South Gama, André Guedes, Amilcar Pinna and Wil Vasque. Fabio Armando, Mike Mattos, Monalisa Silva, Marconi Leal and others also participated in the team, collaborating on scriptwriting, lip-syncing, sound and subtitles.

In addition to the typical animations made in Adobe Flash, the site also had jokes of the same genre, a little shorter, in the "Kabrum! Piada Relâmpago" section. Furthermore, the site had sections for cartoons, funny images, and games, including "Show do milhão", "Ache o Molly" e "Quem sabe sobe".

Among some of the most iconic characters on the Humortadela website, the following stand out:

- Tadelino
- Cachaça e Manguaça
- Nadir
- Sinval
- Asmuié e Uzômi
- Uzviado
- God
- São Pedro
- Nossa Senhora
- Easter Bunny
- Rita
- Leléu e Porela
- Alê e Luia
- Lula
- Tiririca
- Caipira
- Portuga
- Zé Briguento
- João Kleber
- Etezinho e Etezão
- Sílvio Santos
- Ratinho (Chatinho)
- A Sogra
- Os Marcianos
- Ronaldo
- Robocopa
- Ana Maria Braba
- Clodovil
- Jatobá
- Dercy Gonçalves
- Michael Jackson
- Bin Laden

Some of the most frequently mentioned categories include:

- Asmuié e Uzômi
  - Uzviado
- Menos você/Macho você (parody of Mais Você)
- Eskula Shopi
- O Programa do Chatinho
- Nadir, a Empregada
- Sinval, o Herói Nacional
- Genérica (parody of América)
- O que irrita a Rita
- Leléu e Porela
- Repente
- numerous BBB parodies
- SBesteira
- Cachaça e Manguaça
- Etezinho e Etezão
- Será que ele É?
- Especial Dia das Mães
- Páscoa
- Promessas de Ano Novo
- Entrevistas do Tadelino
- Sucesso Humortadela Records Entertainment
- Commercials for Humortadela products:
  - G-30
  - GPS Humor Tadela
  - Ultra Sex Power Guido
  - Robocopa
  - TV Digital
  - FunKids, o CD de Funk feito especialmente para as crianças
  - A Cama do Futuro
  - Despertadela
  - Humortadela Seguros
  - Brain Drive
  - Igreja Resolver
  - Unitadela
  - O Micro do Futuro
  - Allkut (Paródia do Orkut)
  - Academia de Bolso
  - Encalhadas Solution

In 2004, Sérgio Batista published the book Pão com Humor Tadela, containing a selection of jokes, satires, quizzes, and headlines from the website. On April 2, 2006, a Sunday column was added to Bauru's Jornal da Cidade with content from the website. In 2008, a hacker attack knocked the website off for three months, which accelerated its crisis.

On May 5, 2011, it ceased operations, according to its creator, due to lack of money, as stated in an interview he gave to Estadão. According to Alexa, just before closing, it was the fifth most visited website in Angola; it also had a large audience in Brazil, Mozambique and countries with Brazilian immigrants.

On June 29, 2012, the website returned to activity, and in just two days it had already gained more than 52,000 fans on its Facebook page.

On August 20, 2012, the website came back online and resumed its activities. This time the website was sold to Verisoft, owner of OraPois. Group director Vitor Lisboa announced the restitution of the bulk of its content during the rest of the year. On May 7, 2013, the website's host moved to BOL.

Currently, the website is empty and the last update on social media was in 2016.

Since almost all of Humortadela's animations are based on Adobe Flash Player, the end of support for this tool on December 31, 2020, makes the return of Humortadela unlikely, at least in its old format. From 2021 onwards, it has only been possible to access a portion of Humortadela's animations on YouTube through various users and fans of the site.

The legacy of Humortadela still remains today in the work of some of the site's former collaborators. For example, Mike Mattos and Baltazar Paprocki created Piada Tunes with humor similar to Humortadela, which later became known as Anima Tunes. They ended up recycling and bringing to their YouTube channel many of the animations from Humortadela, for which they were mostly the authors.
