= Ranking da Baixaria na TV =

- Publisher: Câmara dos Deputados do Brasil
- Founder: Orlando Fantazzini
- Founded: 2002
- First issue: 2002
- Country: Brazil
- Language: Portuguese
- Website: web.archive.org/web/20070821113434/http://www.eticanatv.org.br/

Quem Financia a Baixaria é Contra a Cidadania also known as the Ranking da Baixaria na TV was an online campaign launched in 2002 by the Comissão de Direitos Humanos e Minorias da Câmara dos Deputados, with the goal of gathering complaints about television programs from that period deemed to be in poor taste.

== Origin ==
The project began in November 2002 and was coordinated by Congressman Orlando Fantazzini and Agostinho Pedro Veit. Its objective was to compile the complaints received via the campaign’s official website and telephone line, with the aim of promoting a boycott and calling for these programs to be taken off the air.

== Reception ==
=== First Edition criticisms ===
The first edition of the ranking was criticized for being considered confusing and for having unclear rules, which could affect channels that had received few reports.

in 2010, More than 892 complaints were filed on the campaign's website. Among those most frequently reported were presenter João Kleber, the show Big Brother Brasil, and Pânico na TV. Other examples include soap operas.

=== Censorship Accusations ===
The initiative was criticized by several owners from broadcasting stations, such as Amilcare Dallevo Jr. of RedeTV! and Dennis Munhoz of Record, who described it as an act of censorship.
