= Bárbara Evans =

Brazilian model and actress

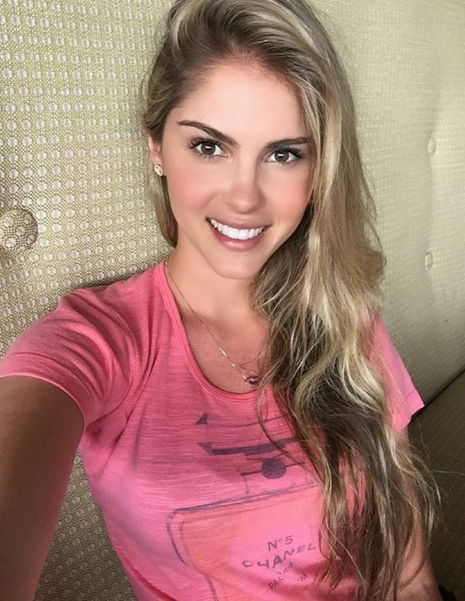
- Born: Bárbara Rezende Clark; May 22, 1991 (age 35); Rio de Janeiro, Brazil
- Occupations: Model, actress
- Years active: 2011–present
- Parent(s): Monique Evans (mother); José Clark (father)

Bárbara Rezende Clark (born May 22, 1991) is a Brazilian model and actress, best known for being the winner of the sixth season of the Brazilian version of The Farm.

== Career ==
Born in Rio de Janeiro, Bárbara is the daughter of Brazilian model, actress and television presenter Monique Evans with the American businessman José Clark. She was a test tube baby.

In 2011 appeared as the cover of Playboy Magazine with great success.

In 2013 she joined A Fazenda 6 and won the award two million.

In 2015 she recorded the miniseries "Dois Irmãos" to Rede Globo that is scheduled to debut in 2017. The attraction is based on the book of the same, written by Milton Hatoum and published in 2000. Her character is Lívia.

== A Fazenda ==
On Jun 21, 2013, two days before the premiere of six season of A Fazenda, which aired on Rede Record, Evans was the first name confirmed after a prize draw to reveal the identity of one of the sixteen participants.

On September 29, 2013, after 100 days of confinement, she was crowned the winner of the season, beating the lawyer Denise Rocha and actor Marcos Oliver the final vote, taking home the R$2 million prize.

Trivia

- Evans is the youngest female winner of the Brazilian version of the reality show so far.
- She is one of three winners who were not farmer of the week during the confinement, the others are Karina Bacchi winner the second season and Viviane Araújo winner of the fifth season.

Preceded by Viviane Araújo	Winner of A Fazenda; A Fazenda 6	Succeeded by DH Silveira
