= André Segatti =

Brazilian actor and model (born 1972)

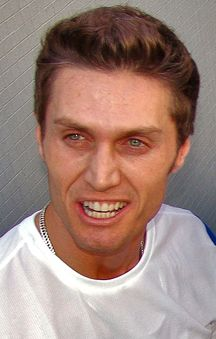
- Born: André Luciano Segatti; May 15, 1972 (age 53); São Paulo, Brazil
- Occupations: Actor, model
- Years active: 1998–2013
- Modeling information
- Height: 1.90 m (6 ft 3 in)
- Hair color: Blonde
- Eye color: Blue

André Luciano Segatti (born May 15, 1972) is a Brazilian actor, model and reality television personality, best known for being the runner-up of the second season of the Brazilian version of The Farm.

== Filmography ==
Television
Year	Title	Role
1998	Malhação	Draco
1998	Labirinto	Alex
1998	Torre de Babel	Trafficker
1998–2002	Turma do Didi	Himself
1999	Chiquinha Gonzaga	Eduardo
2005	Mandrake	Pitgay
2005–2006	Prova de Amor	Gerião Correia
2007	Louca Família	Zito
2007–2008	Caminhos do Coração	Ernesto Medeiros
2008–2009	Os Mutantes	Ernesto Medeiros
2009	A Lei e o Crime	Ferradura
2009–2010	Bela, a Feia	Ivo
2009–2010	A Fazenda 2	Himself
2012	Rei Davi	Paltiel

Film
Year	Title	Role
1999	O Trapalhão e a Luz Azul	Prince Levi
2009	Syndrome	Gregory
