= Thaís Pacholek =

Brazilian actress

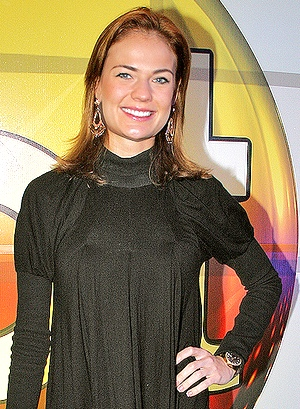
- Pacholek in 2009
- Born: Thaís Felipe Pacholek Belucci; December 20, 1983 (age 42); Curitiba, Paraná, Brazil
- Occupations: Actress, model
- Years active: 2006–present
- Spouse: Belutti (married 2014–present)

Thaís Felipe Pacholek (born December 20, 1983, in Curitiba, Brazil) is a Brazilian actress.

== Filmography ==
=== Television ===
Year	Title	Role
2004	Malhação	Cameo
2006	Cobras & Lagartos	Cameo
2007-2008	Amigas & Rivais	Helena Delaor Martins
2008-2009	Revelação	Beatriz Castelli
2009	Vende-se um Véu de Noiva	Maria Célia Baronese/Renata Baronese
2009-2011	Programa Silvio Santos	Cameo
2011-2012	Amor e Revolução	Míriam Santos Guerra
2012-2013	Balacobaco	Mirela Jordão
2013-2015	Chiquititas	Andreia Casteli
2017-2018	Apocalipse	Monique Filadélfia
2021	Bake Off Celebridades	Contestant
2025	A Caverna Encantada	Talita
