= Nany People =

Brazilian comedian, actress, journalist (born 1965)

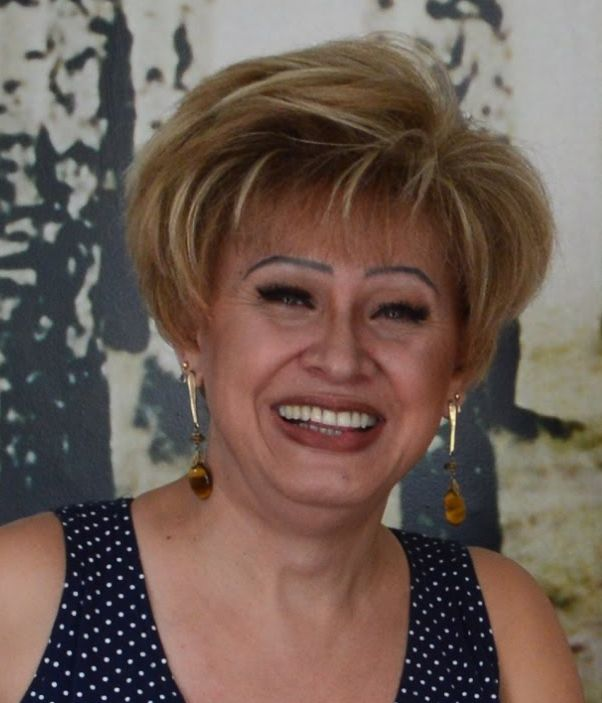
- People in 2017
- Born: 1 July 1965 (age 61); Machado, Minas Gerais, Brazil
- Other name: Nany People Cunha Santos
- Education: Teatro Escola Macunaíma, State University of Campinas
- Occupations: Comedian, drag queen, singer, actress, journalist
- Years active: 1997 – present
- Website: www.nanypeople.com.br

Nany People Cunha Santos (born 1 July 1965) is a Brazilian comedian, singer, actress, journalist, and former drag queen.

== Early life, family, and education ==
Nany People was born on July 1, 1965, in Machado, Minas Gerais, Brazil, and grew up in Poços de Caldas. She was born into an interracial marriage, with a white mother and a black father. Her maternal grandparents disapproved of the marriage of her parents. People was born male, and suffered bullying and physical abuse from her father from a young age due to her feminine appearance. She completed her secondary education with a technical focus, graduating in chemistry.

In 1985, she moved to São Paulo to study theater at the Teatro Escola Macunaíma. She worked as a waitress and theater box office clerk to support herself. During this time, she became a drag queen, and later a trans woman, and in 1992, she chose the name Nany People, inspired by the actress and presenter Nâni Venâncio, of whom she was a fan. In 1995, she underwent treatment for gender reassignment surgery, but decided against it. She graduated with a degree in performing arts from Unicamp (also known as State University of Campinas).

== Career ==
During the 1990s and 2000s, she became one of São Paulo's most famous nightclub hosts, as well as one of the most sought-after drag queens for performances.

In 1998, she acted in the play, Um Homem É um Homem, directed by Alexandre Stockler at the Faap Theater in São Paulo, and in 16 other cities in the interior of São Paulo state.

On radio, between 2000 and 2001, she was a reporter for the program Pânico, a humorous talk show hosted by Emílio Surita, and Zíper, presented by physician Jairo Bouer about sexual health, both on Jovem Pan. Between 2002 and 2005, she was a reporter for the program Sexo Oral, also hosted by Jairo Bouer on 89 FM A Rádio Rock, which focused on sexual health.

In 2001, she was invited by Hebe Camargo to be a reporter for the television program Hebe on Sistema Brasileiro de Televisão (SBT), where she worked for six years. In 2007, she produced and premiered the stand-up show, Nany People Saved My Marriage (Brazilian Portuguese: Nany People Salvou Meu Casamento) and, the following year, A Lesson in Love and Lots of Humor (Brazilian Portuguese: Uma Aula de Amor e Muito Humor), which she toured with for two years.

In 2010, Nany participated in the third season of the television reality show A Fazenda, broadcast by RecordTV, where she was on team Rabbit and was eliminated in fifth place. In 2017, she became a reporter for the Xuxa Meneghel Program on RecordTV.

In 2018, Nany joined the cast of the TV Globo's telenovela, O Sétimo Guardião, playing the trans chemist Marcos Paulo. In 2019, Nany participated in the third season of the talent show Popstar, then broadcast by TV Globo, in which she finished in ninth place.

In 2020, Nany participated in the Programa do Ratinho as a judge in the Dez ou Mil section.

She began participating in the Caldeirola series in 2022, of the Caldeirão com Mion program, as one of the jury members, also composed of Otávio Müller, Juliana Paes and Robson Nunes.

== Filmography ==
=== Film ===
- Cat's Cradle (2002 film), as "trans"
- Believe Me, A Spirit Possessed Me (2006), as Andréa de Villon
- The Laughter of Others (2012), as herself
- Hypotheses for Love and Truth (2015), as announcer
- Who Will End Up With Mario? (2021), as Lana from Holland
- Family Shack (2023 film), as Edna
- A Five-Star Day (2023), as Mrs. Nilda
- There Will Be Change (2023), as Zildete
- Accidental Psychic (2024), as Lígia Rapello
- Suddenly, Miss (2024), as Gigi
- Mallandro, The Wrong Man Who Turned Out Right (2024), as herself

=== Television ===
- Chacrinha's Horn (1974), as participant
- Hebe (2001), as reporter
- A Fazenda (2010), as participant
- Shake, Shake (2015), as Sheila
- Xuxa Meneghel (talk show) (2016), as reporter
- O Sétimo Guardião (2018), as Marcos Paulo Pionowiski
- Popstar (TV series) (2019), as participant
- Programa do Ratinho (2020), as juror
- Quanto Mais Vida, Melhor! (2021), as Lourdes / Madame Lú
- Vai Que Cola (2021), as Agnes Yolanda
- Caldeirão com Mion (2022), as juror
- Fuzuê (2023), as Mariângela de Souza
- Vicky and the Muse (2024), as Mnemosyne
- Full Stop (film) (2024), as Ale
- The Masked Singer Brasil (2025), as "Nazaré Tedesco" in 8th place
- Programa Silvio Santos (2025), as participant (university student)

== See also ==
- List of transgender people
