= Revelação =

Brazilian telenovela

- Genre: Telenovela
- Created by: Íris Abravanel
- Directed by: David Grimberg
- Starring: Tainá Müller; Sérgio Abreu; Thaís Pacholek; Daniel Alvim; Talita Castro; Douglas Aguillar; Jiddu Pinheiro; Ana Carolina Godóy
- Opening theme: "Amanhece um Outro Dia" by Sá, Rodrix e Guarabyra
- Ending theme: "Amanhece um Outro Dia" by Sá, Rodrix e Guarabyra
- Country of origin: Brazil
- Original language: Portuguese
- No. of seasons: 1
- No. of episodes: 163

Production
- Camera setup: Multi-camera
- Production company: SBT

Original release
- Network: SBT
- Release: 8 December 2008 – 15 June 2009

Revelação (English: Revelation) is a Brazilian telenovela produced and aired on SBT between the 8th of December 2008 until the 9th of June 2009 and was replaced by Vende-se um Véu de Noiva. It is an original story, created and written by Iris Abravanel, with the collaboration of Rita Valente, Grace Iwashita, Raphael Baumgardt, Caio Britto, Carlos Marques, Gustavo Braga, Fany Lima, text consultant Thereza di Giácomo and text supervision by Yves Dumont, directed of Jacques Lagoa and Annamaria Dias and the general director was Henrique Martins alongside general direction of theater-music of David Grimberg.

The telenovela stars Sérgio Abreu, Tainá Müller, Daniel Alvim, Talita Castro, Douglas Aguillar, Jiddu Pinheiro, Ana Carolina Godóy and Thaís Pacholek in the main roles.

== Synopsis ==
A story of love, politics and betrayal in this production with outstanding Portuguese scenery. A man in love is forced to decide between his family and power.

== Cast ==
Actor	Character
Sérgio Abreu	Lucas Nogueira
Tainá Müller	Victória Castro
Thaís Pacholek	Beatriz Castelli
Daniel Alvim	Renan Fernandes
Talita Castro	Lara Penteado
Douglas Aguillar	Ricardo Guerra
Jiddu Pinheiro	Leonardo Meira (Léo)
Ana Carolina Godóy	Rebeca Castelli
Flávio Galvão	George Castelli
Renata Zhaneta	Sofia Castelli
Antônio Petrin	Ermírio Fernandes
Tânia Bondezan	Bárbara Fontelle
Ariel Moshe	Eduardo Fontenelle
Marcelo Saback	Fausto Maia
Erom Cordeiro	Comandante Xavier
César Pezzuoli	Elias Mattos
Elaine Cristina	Olga Mattos
Fábio Villa Verde	Paulo Fernandes
Maristane Dresch	Claudia Fernandes
Ernando Tiago	André Fernandes
Lara Córdula	Raquel Fernandes
Bruno Gradim	Renato Castelli
Anastácia Custódio	Ana Souza
Marcela Muniz	Giovanna Mourão
Rafael Fernandes	Carlos Mourão
Walter Breda	Otávio Nogueira
Ângela Correa	Margareth Rodrigues
Bukassa Kabengele	Caio Rodrigues
Janaína Lince	Michelle Rodrigues
Felipe Cardoso	Joabe da Silva (Maçarico)
Henrique Martins	Armando (Oculto)
Camilla Camargo	Nicole Dias (Nick)
Alejandra Sampaio	Albertina
Fernão Lacerda	Geléia
Lúcio Fernandes	Fonseca
Maurício de Barros	Eugênio
Renata Ricci	Karina Fernandes (Nina)
Velson D'Souza	Bruno Fernandes
Vinícius de Loiola	Cássio Fernandes
Renata Sayuri	Fernanda
Veridiana Toledo	Maria José (Mazé)
Gabriel Godoy	Carlos
Edu Martins	Denis
Marcelo Selingardi	Felipão
Nábia Villela	Maria dos Ventos
Rafael Vannucci	Claudiano
Lucas Bagatim	Lucas Fernandes
Raphael Montagner	Marcelo
Caroline Molinari	Júlia Souza
Rodolfo Valente	Pedro Souza
Bia Sion	Suzana Souza
Cristina Sano	Yumiko
Paulo Cahe	Kaio Zanella
Nize Silva	Belinha
Felipe Severo	Caíque Mourão
Klara Castanho	Daniela Mourão
Saulo Meneghetti	Patrício
Diogo Morgado	António
Joana Solnado	Maria João
