= A Fazenda 2 =

Season of television series

- Season 2
- Hosted by: Britto Júnior
- No. of days: 88
- No. of contestants: 14
- Winner: Karina Bacchi
- Runner-up: André Segatti
- No. of episodes: 85

Release
- Original network: RecordTV
- Original release: November 15, 2009 – February 10, 2010

Season chronology
- ← Previous; A Fazenda 1 Next → A Fazenda 3

A Fazenda 2 was the second season of the Brazilian reality television series A Fazenda, which premiered on Sunday, November 15, 2009, on RecordTV. It was hosted by Britto Júnior and reports by Chris Couto. The direction was handled by Rodrigo Carelli, Bruno Gomes, Chica Barros, and Rogerio Farah.

This season was confirmed in July 2009, before the finale of the first season. Britto Junior and Chris Couto reprise their hosting stints for the show.

On February 10, 2010, 33-year-old actress Karina Bacchi won the competition with 56% of the public vote over actor André Segatti (44%).

== Production ==
=== Overview ===
The second season was broadcast during the South American summer, following the winter airing of the previous season. Contestants spent Christmas and New Year's Eve inside the Farm. Both events aired live.

=== Cast ===
There were fourteen celebrity contestants competing for the grand prize, which was R$ 1 million without tax allowances with a brand new car offered to the runner-up. The season lasted 88 days, an increase of a half-week over the previous season.

=== Broadcasts ===
The main television coverage of A Fazenda 2 is screened in daily highlight programs that transmit Sundays to Fridays at 11:00 pm (UTC−3), Saturdays at 10:00 pm (UTC−3), with Sundays, Tuesdays and Wednesdays shows being broadcast live on Rede Record. The episodes summarize the events of the previous day in the Farm.

== Contestants ==
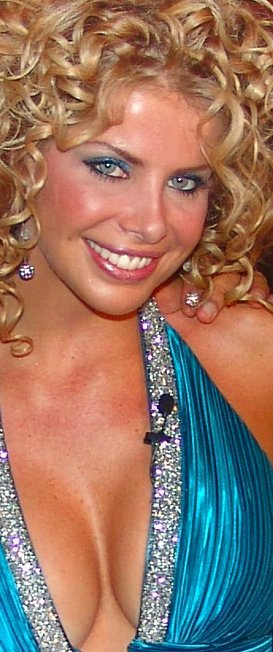
Karina Bacchi, winner of the second season.

The cast list was officially unveiled at the launch night on Sunday, November 15, 2009.

Biographical information according to Record official series site, plus footnoted additions.

(ages stated are at time of contest)

Contestant	Age	Background	Hometown	Original team	Status	Finish
Ana Paula Oliveira	31	Assistant referee	São Paulo		Eliminated 1st on November 22, 2009	14th
Maria João Abujamra	28	Reporter	São Paulo		Eliminated 2nd on November 29, 2009	13th
Adriana Bombom	35	Dancer	Rio de Janeiro		Eliminated 3rd on December 6, 2009	12th
Andressa Oliveira	21	Actress	São Paulo		Eliminated 4th on December 13, 2009	11th
Fernando Scherer	35	Swimmer	Florianópolis	Sheep	Eliminated 5th on December 20, 2009	10th
Mauricio Manieri	39	Musician	São Paulo	Ostrich	Eliminated 6th on December 27, 2009	9th
Caco Ricci	31	Model	São Paulo	Ostrich	Eliminated 7th on January 3, 2010	8th
Sheila Mello	31	Dancer	São Paulo	Sheep	Eliminated 8th on January 10, 2010	7th
Cacau Melo	25	Actress	Rio de Janeiro	Ostrich	Eliminated 9th on January 17, 2010	6th
MC Leozinho	32	Singer	Niterói	Ostrich	Eliminated 10th on January 24, 2010	5th
Igor Cotrim	35	Actor	São Paulo	Sheep	Eliminated 11th on January 31, 2010	4th
Mateus Rocha	35	Actor	Niterói	Sheep	Eliminated 12th on February 7, 2010	3rd
André Segatti	37	Actor	São Paulo	Ostrich	Runner-up on February 10, 2010	2nd
Karina Bacchi	33	Actress	São Manuel	Sheep	Winner on February 10, 2010	1st

== Future appearances ==
In 2011, Ana Paula Oliveira was contender to be a competitor on A Fazenda 4, but ultimately did not return.

In 2017, Sheila Mello appeared in Dancing Brasil 1, she finished in 5th place in the competition.

In 2017, Adriana Bombom returned to compete in A Fazenda 9, she finished in 15th place in the competition.

In 2021, Karina Bacchi appeared on Bake Off Celebridades 2, she finished in a joint 7th place in the competition.

== Voting history ==
	Week 1	Week 2	Week 3	Week 4	Week 5	Week 6	Week 7	Week 8	Week 9	Week 10	Week 11	Week 12	Week 13
	Week 1	Week 2	Week 3	Week 4	Week 5	Week 6	Week 7	Week 8	Week 9	Week 10	Week 11	Week 12	Finale
Farmer of the Week	Andressa	Mateus	Igor	Cacau	Leozinho	Sheila	Leozinho	Cacau	Leozinho	Igor	(none)		
Nominated (Challenge)	Sheila	Maria João	Bombom	Andressa	Caco	Cacau	Cacau	André	Cacau	Karina	(none)		
Nominated (House)	Ana Paula	Igor	Caco	Igor	André	Maurício	Igor	Sheila	Mateus	André	(none)		
Nominated (Farmer)	Mateus	Fernando	Cacau	Mateus	Fernando	Karina	Caco	Karina	Karina	Leozinho	(none)		
Karina	Cacau	Caco	Fernando	André	André	Mauricio	Sheila	Leozinho	Mateus	Leozinho	Nominee	Nominee	Winner (Day 88)
André	Ana Paula	Caco	Caco	Karina	Mateus	Leozinho	Igor	Sheila	Mateus	Mateus	Immune	Nominee	Runner-up (Day 88)
Mateus	Caco	Farmer of the Week	Sheila	Leozinho	André	Mauricio	Caco	Sheila	André	André	Nominee	Nominee	Evicted (Day 85)
Igor	Leozinho	Mauricio	Farmer of the Week	Fernando	André	Caco	Caco	Mateus	Mateus	Farmer of the Week	Nominee	Evicted (Day 78)	
Leozinho	Maria João	Fernando	Andressa	Mateus	Farmer of the Week	André	Farmer of the Week	Karina	Farmer of the Week	André	Evicted (Day 71)		
Cacau	Caco	Caco	André	Farmer of the Week	Mateus	Karina	Igor	Farmer of the Week	Igor	Evicted (Day 64)			
Sheila	Ana Paula	Igor	Andressa	Igor	André	Farmer of the Week	Caco	Leozinho	Evicted (Day 57)				
Caco	Ana Paula	Mauricio	André	Mauricio	Igor	Mauricio	Igor	Evicted (Day 50)					
Mauricio	Caco	Igor	Mateus	Igor	Igor	Karina	Evicted (Day 43)						
Fernando	Igor	Igor	Cacau	Igor	Maurício	Evicted (Day 36)							
Andressa	Farmer of the Week	Igor	Leozinho	Igor	Evicted (Day 29)								
Bombom	Ana Paula	Caco	Caco	Evicted (Day 22)									
Maria João	Leozinho	Igor	Evicted (Day 15)										
Ana Paula	Caco	Evicted (Day 8)											
Notes	1, 2	(none)	3	(none)			4	5	(none)		6	7	8
Nominated for Eviction	Sheila; Ana Paula; Mateus	Maria João; Igor; Fernando	Bombom; Caco; Cacau	Andressa; Igor; Mateus	Caco; André; Fernando	Cacau; Mauricio; Karina	Cacau; Igor; Caco	André; Sheila; Karina	Cacau; Mateus; Karina	Karina; André; Leozinho	Igor; Karina; Mateus	André; Karina; Mateus	André; Karina
Evicted	Ana Paula; 61% to evict	Maria João; 51% to evict	Bombom; 46% to evict	Andressa; 45% to evict	Fernando; 54% to evict	Mauricio; 50% to evict	Caco; 42% to evict	Sheila; 48% to evict	Cacau; 60% to evict	Leozinho; 53% to evict	Igor; 50% to evict	Mateus; 54% to evict	André; 44% to win
Evicted	Ana Paula; 61% to evict	Maria João; 51% to evict	Bombom; 46% to evict	Andressa; 45% to evict	Fernando; 54% to evict	Mauricio; 50% to evict	Caco; 42% to evict	Sheila; 48% to evict	Cacau; 60% to evict	Leozinho; 53% to evict	Igor; 50% to evict	Mateus; 54% to evict	Karina; 56% to win

=== Notes ===
- ^Note 1 : At the launch night, the fourteen celebrity contestants competed in a live challenge. Andressa was the winner and became the first Farmer of the Week.
- ^Note 2 : Ana Paula and Caco were tied with four votes each. First nominee Sheila had the casting vote and chose to nominate Ana Paula.
- ^Note 3 : André, Andressa and Caco were all tied with two votes each. First nominee Bombom had the casting vote and chose to nominate Caco.
- ^Note 4 : Caco and Igor were tied with three votes each. First nominee Cacau had the casting vote and chose to nominate Igor.
- ^Note 5 : Leozinho and Sheila were tied with two votes each. First nominee André had the casting vote and chose to nominate Sheila.
- ^Note 6 : André won the final challenge and won immunity. Therefore, Igor, Karina and Mateus were automatically nominated.
- ^Note 7 : The final three contestants were automatically nominated for the final eviction.
- ^Note 8 : For the final, the public votes for the contestant they want to win A Fazenda 2.
