= Ana Paula Oliveira =

Brazilian football referee, model, and television presenter

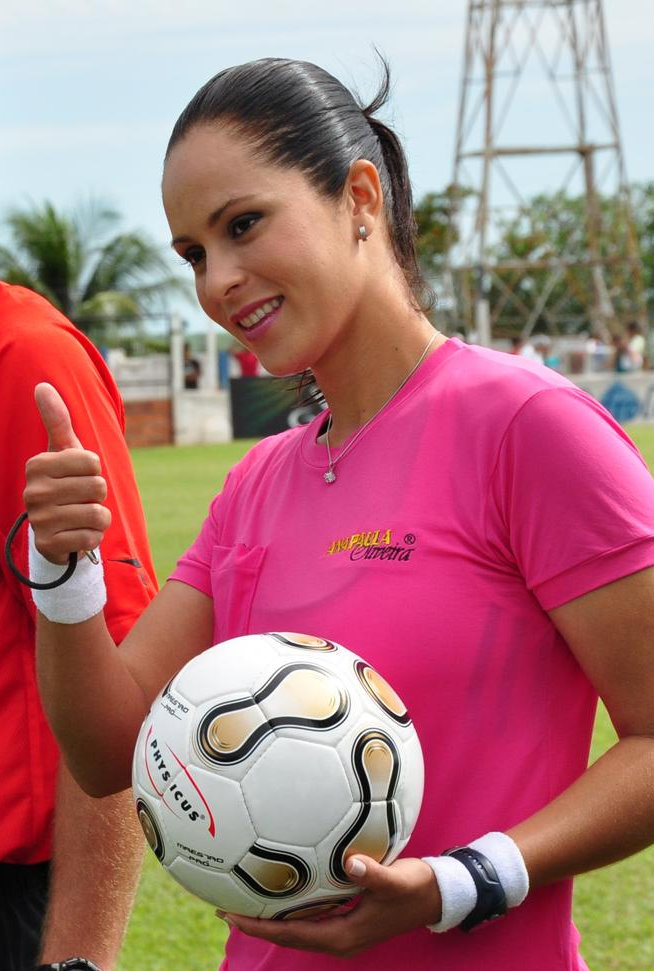
- Ana Paula Oliveira in 2010
- Born: Ana Paula da Silva Oliveira; May 26, 1978 (age 46); São Miguel Paulista, Brazil
- Occupation(s): Football referee, TV presenter

Ana Paula da Silva Oliveira (born May 26, 1978, in São Paulo) is a Brazilian football assistant referee, model and TV presenter.

Born in the quarter of São Miguel Paulista, she was fond of football as a child, and was also engaged in volleyball. From the age of 14 she helped her father, a football referee, who judged the matches of the Hortolândia city amateur championship: she kept a record and marked the events that took place on the field. At the age of 18, the players asked her to sue one match, and Ana kept her promise. From that moment she began to work as a referee.

Since 1998, she has been on the official list of FIFA women referees. In 2001, she first participated in a Campeonato Paulista game. In 2005, she sued several games at the Copa Libertadores, in 2006 she was even entrusted with judging the Copa do Brasil final.

Since 2003, Ana Paula has been working in various magazines, including posing for Playboy Magazine in 2007, which caused a mixed reaction among the fans. Despite the fact that among the fans there were defenders of the decision of the female judge, the Brazilian Football Confederation regarded Ana Paula's act as immoral and again disqualified her, but for as long as 245 days. Moreover, she was expelled from the FIFA judges.

Despite this attitude, Ana Paula did not regret her decision. Back in football she was prevented by a serious injury of the tibia, and as a result, she retired from refereeing, continuing to work on television. In 2009, she took part in the reality show A Fazenda, and later got a job as a commentator on the channel Rede Record. In 2011, she again returned to the show A Fazenda 2, and since 2012 she has been working on TV channel Alterosa, a subsidiary of SBT.
