= João Kléber =

Brazilian television presenter and comedian

- Born: João Ferreira Filho; August 2, 1957; São Paulo, Brazil
- Occupations: Television presenter and comedian

João Kléber, stage name of João Ferreira Filho (born August 2, 1957, in São Paulo), is a Brazilian television presenter and comedian.

== Career ==
João Kléber began his career producing music videos for MTV Brasil. In Rede Globo, he wrote news programs. Kleber was the first to replace Cid Moreira in Jornal Nacional and made the final performances of the television program Cassino do Chacrinha before the death of the host, Chacrinha.

He moved to a show from RedeTV! where he presented the controversial Eu vi na TV. The program was distinguished by "Teste de Fidelidade" (later reassembled in modified form as Fiel ou Infiel in the Portuguese version, also by Kléber).

Kléber also commanded the program Canal Aberto and its successor, Tarde Quente, whose politically incorrect candid cameras drove RedeTV! be taken off the air in São Paulo for a day. Back on air, the station fired Kléber and canceled Tarde Quente and Eu vi na TV.

After his departure from RedeTV!, he moved to Portugal, where he led the program Fiel ou Infiel on TVI. He lived in Lisbon with his wife.

Recently, he returned to Brazil and appeared on reality TV show A Fazenda 4 of Rede Record. He came fourth with 47% of the vote. During his participation, he fought with former colleagues in RedeTV! Monique Evans and the models Taciane Ribeiro and Renata Banhara. He had a crush on Joana Machado (former player Adriano).
