= Rei Davi =

- Genre: Miniseries; Biblical epic
- Written by: Vivian de Oliveira
- Directed by: Edson Spinello
- Starring: Leonardo Brício; Renata Dominguez; Gracindo Júnior; Iran Malfitano; Maria Ribeiro; Camila Rodrigues; Élder Gattelly; Cláudio Fontana
- Country of origin: Brazil
- Original language: Portuguese
- No. of episodes: 30

Production
- Running time: 50 min.

Original release
- Network: RecordTV
- Release: January 24 – May 3, 2012

Rei Davi (English: King David) is a Brazilian miniseries produced and broadcast by RecordTV. It premiered on January 12, 2012, and ended on May 3, 2012. The series is based on the Books of Samuel and a part of I Kings.

== Synopsis ==
The plot is based on I Samuel and II Samuel. It shows the life of David, a shepherd son of Jesse, who will become the most important king of Israel. After he wins several battles, including slaying the giant Goliath, king Saul marries him to Saul's younger daughter Michal, but she is always envious of David's other wives because of her infertility. King Saul, his main enemy, wants to kill him, but is slain in battle alongside his oldest son Jonathan, David's closest friend. David assumes the throne of Judah, ruling the land that belongs to his tribe, but even so he will have enemies: Saul's younger son Etbaal takes over the throne of Israel. After the death of Etbaal, David becomes the king of Israel and makes the city of Jerusalem the capital of his, now united, kingdom.

== Cast ==
Actor	Character
Leonardo Brício	David
Renata Dominguez	Bate-Seba
Maria Ribeiro	Michal
Iran Malfitano	Abner
Camila Rodrigues	Merab
Gracindo Júnior	Saul
Angela Leal	Edna
Marly Bueno	Ahinoam
Paulo Figueiredo	Ahitophel
Roger Gobeth	Amnon
Léo Rosa	Absalom
Bianca Castanho	Selima
Thierry Figueira	Ziba
Rodrigo Phavanello	Eliabe
João Vitti	Joabe
Cláudio Fontana	Jônatas
Roberta Gualda	Tirsa
Raquel Nunes	Rispai
Gabriel Gracindo	Husai
Alexandre Barillari	Urias
Raymundo de Souza	Agague
Vitor Hugo	Mephiboshet
Leandro Léo	Davi (young)
Clemente Viscaíno	Jessé
André Segatti	Paltiel (Palti)
Thelmo Fernandes	Profeta Natã
Caetano O'Maihlan	Baaná
Cibele Larrama	Allat
Júlia Fajardo	Tamar
Rômulo Estrela	Adriel
Amanda Diniz	Merabe (young)
Roney Villela	Doegue
Daniel Andrade	Esbaal
Isaac Bardavid	Samuel
Yunes Chamil	Aimeleque
Oberdan Júnior	Josias
Daniel Ávila	Jonadabe
Eduardo Semerjian	Eliã
Élder Gatelly	Sacerdote Abiatar
Daniel Bouzas	Itai
Janaína Ávila	Abigail
Bernardo Segreto	Joabe (young)
Felipe Kannenberg	Aquis
Cacau Mello	Raquel
Eline Porto	Mical (young)
Thaís Vaz	Maaca

== Production ==
The series had scenes filmed in stockshot in the Desert of Chile and in cities of Canada, like Cache Creek and Kamloops. There were scenes in Rio Grande and in other cities outside of São Paulo, like Diamantina, in Minas Gerais.

Some actors had to learn Hebrew and how to make bread, besides customs of the time of the Bible and tactics of war. The series cost R$25,000,000.

== Broadcast ==
The series was broadcast on Tuesdays and Thursday from January 24, 2012 to May 3, 2012. It was rerun from October 22, 2012 to December 17, 2012 and again from November 16, 2015 to January 18, 2016.

In the United States it aired on MundoMax in 2013. It also aired on Univision from December 11, 2017 to January 12, 2018 at 8pm/7c.
