= Karina Bacchi =

Brazilian actress, model and reality television personality

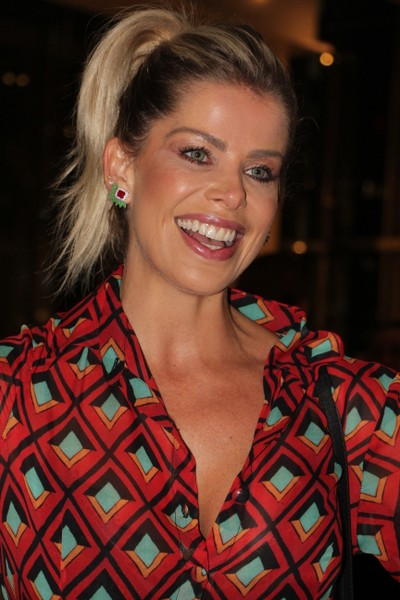
- Bacchi in 2016
- Born: October 8, 1976 (age 49); São Manuel, São Paulo, Brazil
- Occupations: Actress, model, television presenter
- Spouses: Sérgio Amon (m. 2001; div. 2011) Amaury Nunes (m. 2018)
- Children: 1
- Modeling information
- Height: 1.68 m (5 ft 6 in)
- Hair color: Brown
- Eye color: Blue
- Website: www.karinabacchiblog.com.br

Karina Bacchi (Portuguese: [kaˈɾinɐ baˈki]; born October 8, 1976) is a Brazilian actress, model and television presenter, best known for being the winner of the first season of the Brazilian version of Dancing with the Stars (late 2005) and the winner of the second season of the Brazilian version of The Farm (early 2010).

== Biography ==
Karina was born in São Manuel, São Paulo. She is of Italian, Spanish, and African descent.

== Career ==
She began her modeling career at the age of four. At the age of fourteen, she moved to São Paulo, where she first designed herself as a photographic model and later in parades, advertising campaigns in magazines and television. In addition to advertising and fashion, she studied theater and dance. Karina Bacchi illustrated numerous covers of magazines such as Playboy, Galileo, Boa Forma, Nova, Vip, among others. She also did several pictorials for sites such as the Paparazzo and The Girl.

== Personal life ==
On August 8, 2017, her first child was born. Enrico Bacchi was born in Miami, Florida, the result of an artificial insemination procedure. She is a São Paulo FC fan.

== Partial filmography ==
Television
Year	Title	Role
2000	Vidas Cruzadas	Renata
2001	Pícara Sonhadora	Mônica
2001–2002	O Clone	Muna
2002	Marisol	Sabrina
2003	Agora É que São Elas	Pamela
2004	Da Cor do Pecado	Tina
2005	Dança dos Famosos	Herself
2006	Cidadão Brasileiro	Bruna
2007–2008	Caminhos do Coração	Gloria
2007	Simple Life: Mudando de Vida	Herself
2008	Bacchi com Karina	Herself
2009–2010	A Fazenda 2	Herself
2012	Pop Up	Hostess

Preceded by Dado Dolabella	Winner of A Fazenda; A Fazenda 2	Succeeded by Daniel Bueno
