= Daniel Bueno (model) =

Brazilian model and television personality

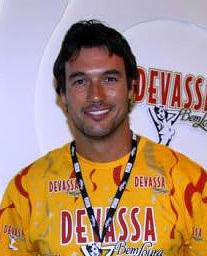
- Bueno in 2011
- Born: Daniel Campedelli Bueno; 25 March 1977 (age 49); Porto Alegre, Brazil
- Occupations: Model, television personality
- Height: 1.85 m (6 ft 1 in)
- Spouse: Adriana Schrank c. 2012 d. 2022)
- Children: 3

Daniel Campedelli Bueno (born 25 March 1977) is a Brazilian fashion model and reality television personality, best known for being the winner of the third season of A Fazenda, the Brazilian version of The Farm.

== Career ==
Bueno started traveling and working as a model in 2000. He paraded in editions of Rio Fashion Week and of São Paulo Fashion Week until 2004, the year he moved to New York shortly after signing with Ford Models.

In 2002, Bueno started an international modeling career in Italy via Ford Models Brasil, where he paraded to Calvin Klein and Guess?, recorded a commercial for cosmetics company L'Oréal and paraded to Ermenegildo Zegna at Milan Fashion Week.

In addition, paraded to Armani at Milan Fashion Week and also appeared in advertising campaigns for several brands, including for Banana Republic.

=== A Fazenda ===
On 28 September 2010, Daniel Bueno was officially announced as one of the fifteen celebrities contestants on the third season of A Fazenda, the Brazilian version of reality series The Farm, which aired on Rede Record.

On 21 December 2010, after 85 days, he was crowned the winner of the season, beating actor Sérgio Abreu and model Lisi Benitez in the final vote, taking home the R$2 million prize.

== Personal life ==
Bueno is the father of three children, Marina and Angelina with his wife Adriana Schrank (a dentist), and Luke, from his first wedding.

| Preceded by Karina Bacchi | Winner of A Fazenda; A Fazenda 3 | Succeeded by Joana Machado |
