= A Fazenda 4 =

Season of television series

- Season 4
- Hosted by: Britto Júnior
- No. of days: 86
- No. of contestants: 16
- Winner: Joana Machado
- Runner-up: Monique Evans
- Companion show: A Fazenda Online
- No. of episodes: 83

Release
- Original network: RecordTV
- Original release: July 19 – October 12, 2011

Series chronology
- ← Previous; A Fazenda 3 Next → A Fazenda 5

A Fazenda 4 was the fourth season of the Brazilian reality television series A Fazenda, which premiered on Tuesday, July 19, 2011, on RecordTV. It was hosted by Britto Júnior and reports by Chris Couto. and behind the scenes on the official website with Felipe Vita on A Fazenda Online.

This season was confirmed on late December 2010, before the finale of the third season. Britto Junior and Chris Couto reprise their hosting stints for the show. Felipe Vita makes his debut as the show's commander on A Fazenda Online.

For the first time ever, four women reached the finals, making this the first reality show in Brazilian television history with public voting to do so. No Limite 1 (2000) and Aprendiz 6 − Universitário (2009) also managed to create all female final fours but there was no public vote involved.

On October 12, 2011, 30-year-old personal trainer Joana Machado won the competition with 48% of the public vote over TV host Monique Evans (44%) and DJ Raquel Pacheco (8%).

== Production ==
=== Overview ===
Due to the 2011 Pan American Games, the fourth season marked the return of the show to its original run, during the South American winter–spring, following the spring airing of the past two seasons. The fourth season lasted a total of 87 days, an increase of one day over the past season.

=== Cast ===
There are new sixteen celebrities to Farm. As part of the twist for this edition, three former contestants re-entered the Farm for another chance to win the grand prize, which remains R$ 2 million without tax allowances. with a brand new car offered to the runner-up. Duda Yankovich was ejected on day 23 and was replaced two days later by Dani Bolina, who entered on day 25.

=== Broadcasts ===
The main television coverage of A Fazenda 4 is screened in daily highlight programs that transmit Mondays to Fridays at 11:15pm (UTC−3), Saturdays at 10:15pm (UTC−3) and Sundays at 08:00pm (first four weeks) and at 11:15pm (for the remainder of the season) (UTC−3), with Sundays, Tuesdays and Thursdays shows being broadcast live on Rede Record.

The episodes summarize the events of the previous day in the Farm. It is the first season to be filmed and broadcast in high-definition.

== Contestants ==
Biographical information according to Record official series site, plus footnoted additions.
(ages stated are at time of contest)

Contestant	Age	Background	Hometown	Original team	Merged team	Status	Finish
Renata Banhara	36	Media personality	Taubaté	Rabbit		Eliminated 1st on July 28, 2011	16th
François Teles	37	Model	Vitória	Sheep		Eliminated 2nd on August 4, 2011	15th
Duda Yankovich	34	Boxer	Jagodina, Serbia	Sheep		Ejected on August 9, 2011	14th
Taciane Ribeiro	23	Model	Itapira	Rabbit		Eliminated 3rd on August 11, 2011	13th
João Kleber	53	TV host	São Paulo	Ostrich		Eliminated 4th on August 18, 2011	12th
Dani Bolina	27	Model	Porto Alegre	Sheep		Eliminated 5th on August 25, 2011	11th
Anna Markun	36	Actress	Rio de Janeiro	Sheep		Eliminated 6th on September 1, 2011	10th
Compadre Washington	50	Singer	Salvador	Rabbit		Eliminated 7th on September 8, 2011	9th
Gui Pádua	37	Parachutist	São Paulo	Ostrich	Final eight	Eliminated 8th on September 15, 2011	8th
Dinei	40	Former football player	São Paulo	Ostrich	Final eight	Eliminated 9th on September 22, 2011	7th
Thiago Gagliasso	22	Actor	Rio de Janeiro	Ostrich	Final eight	Eliminated 10th on September 29, 2011	6th
Marlon	33	Musician	Criciúma	Sheep	Final eight	Eliminated 11th on October 4, 2011	5th
Valesca Popozuda	32	Singer	Rio de Janeiro	Ostrich	Final eight	Eliminated 12th on October 9, 2011	4th
Raquel Pacheco	26	DJ & writer	São Paulo	Rabbit	Final eight	Third place on October 12, 2011	3rd
Monique Evans	55	TV host	Rio de Janeiro	Rabbit	Final eight	Runner-up on October 12, 2011	2nd
Joana Machado	30	Personal trainer	Rio de Janeiro	Sheep	Final eight	Winner on October 12, 2011	1st

== Future Appearances ==
In 2016, Valesca Popozuda appeared in Dança dos Famosos 13, she finished in 10th place in the competition, in 2021, Popozuda appeared in Ilha Record 1 she finished in 4th place in the competition.

In 2017, Dinei returned to compete in A Fazenda 9, he finished in 13th place in the competition, in 2021, Dinei appeared in Ilha Record 1 he originally finished in 13th place, however he comeback to the game and finished in 5th place, in 2022, Dinei appeared with his wife Erika Dias in Power Couple Brasil 6, they finished in 12th place in the competition.

In 2018, Marlon appeared with his wife Leticia Oliveira in Power Couple Brasil 3, they finished in 5th place in the competition.

== The game ==
The fourth season featured the return of actress Franciely Freduzeski (season 1), assistant referee Ana Paula Oliveira (season 2) and TV host Monique Evans (season 3), who were the first celebrities to be evicted in their respective seasons, for another chance to win the grand prize.

Contestants were divided into three teams of five members. On week 8, the teams competed in the season's super challenge for a chance to win an R$500,000 extra prize (equally divided between the remaining team members).

Team Ostrich (Dinei, Gui, Thiago and Valesca) won the challenge, with each one of them winning R$125,000.

== Voting history ==
	Week 1	Week 2	Week 3	Week 4	Week 5	Week 6	Week 7	Week 8	Week 9	Week 10	Week 11	Week 12	
	Week 1	Week 2	Week 3	Week 4	Week 5	Week 6	Week 7	Week 8	Week 9	Week 10	Week 11	Day 81	Finale
Farmer of the Week	Anna	João	Valesca	Joana	Gui	Joana	Gui	Raquel	Joana	Marlon	Valesca	(none)	
Nomination winner	François	Anna	Thiago	Marlon	Thiago	Dinei	Joana	Marlon	Dinei	Thiago	Raquel	(none)	
Nominated (Challenge)	Gui	Monique	Duda	João	Dani	Marlon	Raquel	Joana	Monique	Raquel	Marlon	(none)	
Nominated (Challenge)	Taciane	Valesca	Washington	Raquel	Monique	Washington	Thiago	Joana	Monique	Raquel	Marlon	(none)	
Nominated (House)	João	François	Taciane	Anna	Thiago	Anna	Washington	Monique	Marlon	Thiago	(none)	(none)	
Nominated (Farmer)	Renata	Raquel	Joana	Gui	Joana	Gui	Joana	Gui	Dinei	Valesca	Monique	(none)	
Joana	João	Washington	Dinei	Farmer of the Week	Thiago	Farmer of the Week	Washington	Gui	Farmer of the Week	Thiago	Saved	Nominee	Winner (Day 86)
Monique	João	François	Joana	Gui	Joana	Anna	Washington	Gui	Marlon	Thiago	Nominee	Nominee	Runner-up (Day 86)
Raquel	João	François	João	Dinei	Thiago	Anna	Washington	Farmer of the Week	Marlon	Thiago	Immune	Immune	Third place (Day 86)
Valesca	João	Washington	Farmer of the Week	Monique	Marlon	Anna	Washington	Gui	Marlon	Thiago	Farmer of the Week	Nominee	Evicted (Day 83)
Marlon	Valesca	Washington	Taciane	Dinei	Thiago	Anna	Dinei	Monique	Valesca	Farmer of the Week	Nominee	Evicted (Day 78)	
Thiago	Renata	Raquel	Taciane	Anna	Marlon	Anna	Monique	Monique	Raquel	Joana	Evicted (Day 73)		
Dinei	François	François	Taciane	Anna	Marlon	Anna	Marlon	Monique	Raquel	Evicted (Day 66)			
Gui	Raquel	François	Taciane	Anna	Farmer of the Week	Anna	Farmer of the Week	Monique	Evicted (Day 59)				
Washington	Thiago	François	Marlon	Anna	Marlon	Anna	Monique	Evicted (Day 52)					
Anna	Farmer of the Week	Washington	Taciane	Thiago	Thiago	Gui	Evicted (Day 45)						
Dani	Not in house			Anna	Thiago	Evicted (Day 38)							
João	Raquel	François	Taciane	Anna	Evicted (Day 31)								
Taciane	João	François	Thiago	Evicted (Day 24)									
Duda	João	Washington	Taciane	Ejected (Day 22)									
François	Valesca	Washington	Evicted (Day 17)										
Renata	João	Evicted (Day 10)											
Notes	(none)	1	2	3	(none)			4	(none)		5	6	7
Up for Nomination	Gui; João; Renata; Taciane	François; Monique; Raquel; Valesca	Duda; Joana; Taciane; Washington	Anna; Gui; João; Raquel	Dani; Joana; Monique; Thiago	Anna; Gui; Marlon; Washington	Joana; Raquel; Thiago; Washington	Gui; Joana; Monique	Dinei; Marlon; Monique	Raquel; Thiago; Valesca	(none)		
Saved	João	Valesca	Joana	Gui	Joana	Gui	Raquel	Joana	Marlon	Valesca	(none)		
Nominated for Eviction	Gui; Renata; Taciane	François; Monique; Raquel	~~Duda~~; Taciane; Washington	Anna; João; Raquel	Dani; Monique; Thiago	Anna; Marlon; Washington	Joana; Thiago; Washington	Gui; Monique	Dinei; Monique	Raquel; Thiago	Marlon; Monique	Joana; Monique; Valesca	Joana; Monique; Raquel
Ejected	(none)		Duda	(none)									
Evicted	Renata; 54% to evict	François; 58% to evict	Taciane; 65% to evict	João; 47% to evict	Dani; 54% to evict	Anna; 47% to evict	Washington; 66% to evict	Gui; 72% to evict	Dinei; 75% to evict	Thiago; 51% to evict	Marlon; 60% to evict	Valesca; 46% to evict	Raquel; 8% to win
Evicted	Renata; 54% to evict	François; 58% to evict	Taciane; 65% to evict	João; 47% to evict	Dani; 54% to evict	Anna; 47% to evict	Washington; 66% to evict	Gui; 72% to evict	Dinei; 75% to evict	Thiago; 51% to evict	Marlon; 60% to evict	Valesca; 46% to evict	Monique; 44% to win
Evicted	Renata; 54% to evict	François; 58% to evict	Taciane; 65% to evict	João; 47% to evict	Dani; 54% to evict	Anna; 47% to evict	Washington; 66% to evict	Gui; 72% to evict	Dinei; 75% to evict	Thiago; 51% to evict	Marlon; 60% to evict	Valesca; 46% to evict	Joana; 48% to win

=== Notes ===
- Note 1: At the second round of nominations, François and Washington tied after received six votes each. João, the Farmhouse Leader, had the casting vote and chose François to be the third nominee.
- Note 2: Duda was ejected on day 22 due to violent behaviour towards Thiago. Despite the fact that she was already up for eviction, a regular eviction would also take place. Joana won the Farmhouse Leader competition, leaving Taciane and Washington to face the public vote.
- Note 3: Dani received an extra immunity for her first week in the game.
- Note 4: On day 51, host Britto Junior revealed that one member of the super-challenge winning team would win an extra immunity for week 8. On day 52, team Ostrich came out as the winner. As the result, Dinei was voted by all his team members (in that order − Thiago, Valesca and Gui) to win that immunity.
- Note 5: Following Thiago's eviction on day 73, host Britto Junior revealed that the Nomination Challenge winner would win an extra immunity for week 11. On day 76, Raquel won the final Nomination Challenge over Marlon, winning immunity and leaving him as the first nominee. Farmhouse Leader Valesca chose Monique to be the second nominee.
- Note 6: Following Marlon's eviction on day 78, host Britto Junior revealed that the final four contestants would compete in the Final Immunity Challenge for place in the final. Raquel was the winner and became the first finalist of the season. Joana, Monique and Valesca were automatically nominated for eviction by default.
- Note 7: For the final round, the public votes for the contestant they want to win the season.

== Ratings and reception ==
=== Brazilian ratings ===
All numbers are in points and provided by Kantar Ibope Media.

Week	First air date	Last air date	Timeslot (BRT)	Daily SP viewers (in points)							SP viewers (in points)	Source
Week	First air date	Last air date	Timeslot (BRT)	Mon	Tue	Wed	Thu	Fri	Sat	Sun	SP viewers (in points)	Source
1	July 19, 2011	July 24, 2011	Everyday; 11:15 p.m.	—	16	13	13	11	11	14	13.0	
2	July 25, 2011	July 31, 2011	Everyday; 11:15 p.m.	12	12	13	11	10	11	13	11.7	
3	August 1, 2011	August 7, 2011	Everyday; 11:15 p.m.	10	12	14	11	11	09	13	11.4	
4	August 8, 2011	August 14, 2011	Everyday; 11:15 p.m.	10	14	15	12	12	13	13	12.7	
5	August 15, 2011	August 21, 2011	Everyday; 11:15 p.m.	14	12	12	11	10	09	11	11.3	
6	August 22, 2011	August 28, 2011	Everyday; 11:15 p.m.	12	14	14	13	12	11	11	12.4	
7	August 29, 2011	September 4, 2011	Everyday; 11:15 p.m.	10	12	13	10	10	12	10	11.0	
8	September 5, 2011	September 11, 2011	Everyday; 11:15 p.m.	10	12	12	13	10	12	11	11.0	
9	September 12, 2011	September 18, 2011	Everyday; 11:15 p.m.	11	12	12	10	10	12	11	11.1	
10	September 19, 2011	September 25, 2011	Everyday; 11:15 p.m.	10	12	10	11	10	10	11	10.6	
11	September 26, 2011	October 2, 2011	Everyday; 11:15 p.m.	08	11	09	12	11	12	11	10.6	
12	October 3, 2011	October 9, 2011	Everyday; 11:15 p.m.	10	10	11	09	10	10	10	10.1	
13	October 10, 2011	October 12, 2011	Everyday; 11:15 p.m.	09	10	15	—	—	—	—	11.3	

- Each point represents 58.000 households in São Paulo.

== Controversies ==
=== Duda Yankovich ===
On August 9, 2011, boxer champion Duda Yankovich was ejected due to violent behaviour towards actor Thiago Gagliasso after an argument between them during a basketball game in the pool. Model Dani Bolina entered the game on August 11, 2011 as Duda's replacement.

The fact that gained much media attention since the incident and even more after the ejection. The network's decision was highly praised by the press and viewers.

=== Thiago Gagliasso ===
On September 7, 2011, actor Thiago Gagliasso made a controversial comment regarding that he has slapped some goats behind the chicken coop, a place that, according to him, there would be no cameras. A YouTube user posted the clip of the comment online. Several NGOs such as PEA, manifested on Twitter asking for Thiago's ejection.

Record, broadcaster of the program, released a public statement on September 8 regarding the controversial statement stating that the farm is monitored 24 hours a day and in no time, Thiago or any other contestant was caught assaulting a goat or any other animal. The chicken coop area where the goats cross during the morning activity, is filmed and images of Thiago on that area have already been aired. All the farm animals are healthy, well cared and daily monitoring.

TV host Luísa Mell, known for her work to protect animals, began a campaign to evict the actor. Singer Rita Lee was also outraged and used Twitter to express herself. "Bruno Gagliasso sorry, but your brother is a jerk. Get Thiago out!", she wrote. Despite Record statement, the controversy only increased.

As result of Thiago Gagliasso's behaviour, on September 10, all contestants had to sleep outside the farmhouse as a punishment. Farmer of the week Raquel Pacheco read a warning statement from the production: "All animals deserve respect and care". The actor apologized to the house, but was outraged at the punishment. Valesca asked him to control himself when he began to curse the animals.
