= A Fazenda 3 =

Season of television series

- Season 3
- Hosted by: Britto Júnior
- No. of days: 85
- No. of contestants: 15
- Winner: Daniel Bueno
- Runner-up: Sérgio Abreu
- No. of episodes: 83

Release
- Original network: RecordTV
- Original release: September 28 – December 21, 2010

Series chronology
- ← Previous; A Fazenda 2 Next → A Fazenda 4

A Fazenda 3 was the third season of the Brazilian reality television series A Fazenda, which premiered on Tuesday, September 28, 2010, on RecordTV. It was hosted by Britto Júnior and reports by Chris Couto.

The third season was confirmed on late–January 2010, before the finale of the second season. Britto Junior and Chris Couto reprise their hosting stints for the show, while Carolina Magalhães make her debut as the show's new special correspondent.

On December 21, 2010, 33-year-old model Daniel Bueno won the competition with 44% of the public vote over actor Sérgio Abreu (40%) and model Lizi Benites (16%).

== Production ==
=== Overview ===
There were fifteen celebrity contestants competing for the grand prize, making this the first season to have an odd number of original contestants. The prize award was R$ 2 million without tax allowances, the biggest prize in history of the series. with a brand new car offered to the runner-up.

The season lasted 85 days, a decrease of four days over the previous season. Instead of the final two, this season was a final three facing the public vote on finale night.

== Contestants ==
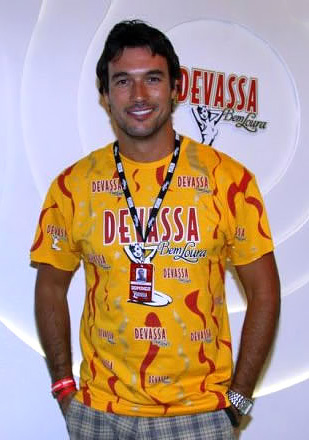
Daniel Bueno, winner of the third season.

The cast list was officially unveiled at the launch night on Tuesday, September 28, 2010.
Biographical information according to Record official series site, plus footnoted additions.
(ages stated are at time of contest)

Contestant	Age	Background	Hometown	Original team	Merged team	Status	Finish
Monique Evans	54	TV host	Rio de Janeiro	Rabbit		Eliminated 1st on October 7, 2010	15th
Geisy Arruda	20	Businesswoman	Diadema	Sheep		Eliminated 2nd on October 14, 2010	14th
Tico Santa Cruz	32	Singer	Rio de Janeiro	Sheep		Eliminated 3rd on October 21, 2010	13th
Sergio Mallandro	52	Comedian	Rio de Janeiro	Ostrich		Eliminated 4th on October 28, 2010	12th
Nany People	45	Drag queen	Machado	Rabbit		Eliminated 5th on November 4, 2010	11th
Dudu Pelizzari	25	Actor	São Paulo	Rabbit		Eliminated 6th on November 11, 2010	10th
Viola	41	Former football player	São Paulo	Ostrich		Eliminated 7th on November 18, 2010	9th
Carlos Carrasco	44	Make-up artist	São José	Sheep	Final eight	Eliminated 8th on November 25, 2010	8th
Andressa Soares	22	Singer	Rio de Janeiro	Rabbit	Final eight	Eliminated 9th on December 2, 2010	7th
Janaina Jacobina	29	Reporter	Cuiabá	Ostrich	Final eight	Eliminated 10th on December 9, 2010	6th
Ana Carolina Dias	22	Actress	Rio de Janeiro	Rabbit	Final eight	Eliminated 11th on December 14, 2010	5th
Luiza Gottschalk	26	TV host	São Paulo	Sheep	Final eight	Eliminated 12th on December 19, 2010	4th
Lizi Benites	30	Model	Porto Alegre	Ostrich	Final eight	Third place on December 21, 2010	3rd
Sérgio Abreu	34	Actor	Rio de Janeiro	Sheep	Final eight	Runner-up on December 21, 2010	2nd
Daniel Bueno	33	Model	Porto Alegre	Ostrich	Final eight	Winner on December 21, 2010	1st

== Future appearances ==
In 2011, Monique Evans was contender to be a competitor on A Fazenda 4. She won the public vote and finished the season as runner-up.

In 2015, Nany People appeared in A Fazenda 8 as a guest to give the remained competitors a letter from week 4 eliminated celebrity, in 2019, People appeared in Popstar 3, she finished in 9th place in the competition

In 2018, Dudu Pelizzari appeared in Dancing Brasil 3, he finished in 6th place in the competition.

== Voting history ==
	Week 1	Week 2	Week 3	Week 4	Week 5	Week 6	Week 7	Week 8	Week 9	Week 10	Week 11	Week 12	
	Week 1	Week 2	Week 3	Week 4	Week 5	Week 6	Week 7	Week 8	Week 9	Week 10	Week 11	Day 80	Finale
Farmer of the Week	Mallandro	Sérgio	Daniel	Carrasco	Viola	Lizi	Carol	Andressa	Janaína	Luiza	Sérgio		(none)
Nominated (Challenge)	Monique	Janaína	Tico	Sérgio	Nany	Carol	Andressa	Carrasco	Sérgio	Janaína	Carol; Lizi	Lizi; Luiza	(none)
Nominated (House)	Sérgio	Geisy	Sérgio	Luiza	Carrasco	Janaína	Janaína	Janaína	Andressa	Daniel	(none)		(none)
Nominated (Farmer)	Luiza	Dudu	Carrasco	Mallandro	Sérgio	Dudu	Viola	(none)			(none)		(none)
Daniel	Sérgio	Geisy	Farmer of the Week	Luiza	Carrasco	Janaína	Janaína	Janaína	Andressa	Sérgio	Saved	Saved	Winner (Day 85)
Sérgio	Dudu	Farmer of the Week	Carol	Mallandro	Dudu	Viola	Viola	Janaína	Daniel	Daniel	Farmer of the Week	Immune	Runner-up (Day 85)
Lizi	Sérgio	Geisy	Sérgio	Luiza	Carrasco	Farmer of the Week	Janaína	Janaína	Carol	Carol	Nominee	Nominee	Third place (Day 85)
Luiza	Dudu	Dudu	Carol	Mallandro	Janaína	Dudu	Viola	Janaína	Andressa	Daniel	Immune	Nominee	Evicted (Day 83)
Carol	Sérgio	Geisy	Sérgio	Luiza	Carrasco	Janaína	Farmer of the Week	Janaína	Daniel	Daniel	Nominee	Evicted (Day 78)	
Janaína	Sérgio	Geisy	Sérgio	Luiza	Daniel	Viola	Viola	Daniel	Andressa	Carol	Evicted (Day 73)		
Andressa	Sérgio	Geisy	Luiza	Luiza	Carrasco	Luiza	Janaína	Janaína	Daniel	Evicted (Day 66)			
Carrasco	Dudu	Mallandro	Carol	Farmer of the Week	Janaína	Dudu	Viola	Daniel	Evicted (Day 59)				
Viola	Sérgio	Geisy	Sérgio	Luiza	Farmer of the Week	Janaína	Janaína	Evicted (Day 52)					
Dudu	Sérgio	Geisy	Sérgio	Lizi	Carrasco	Janaína	Evicted (Day 45)						
Nany	Sérgio	Geisy	Luiza	Luiza	Janaína	Evicted (Day 38)							
Mallandro	Farmer of the Week	Geisy	Sérgio	Luiza	Evicted (Day 31)								
Tico	Dudu	Dudu	Carol	Evicted (Day 24)									
Geisy	Dudu	Dudu	Evicted (Day 17)										
Monique	Dudu	Evicted (Day 10)											
Notes	(none)						1	2	3	(none)	4	5	6
Nominated for Eviction	Luiza; Sérgio; Monique	Dudu; Geisy; Janaína	Carrasco; Sérgio; Tico	Luiza; Sérgio; Mallandro	Carrasco; Sérgio; Nany	Carol; Dudu; Janaína	Andressa; Janaína; Viola	Carrasco; Janaína	Andressa; Sérgio	Daniel; Janaína	Carol; Lizi	Lizi; Luiza	Daniel; Lizi; Sérgio
Evicted	Monique; 56% to evict	Geisy; 57% to evict	Tico; 74% to evict	Mallandro; 48% to evict	Nany; 63% to evict	Dudu; 52% to evict	Viola; 76% to evict	Carrasco; 50.40% to evict	Andressa; 72% to evict	Janaína; 58% to evict	Carol; 50.20% to evict	Luiza; 50.70% to evict	Lizi; 16% to win
Evicted	Monique; 56% to evict	Geisy; 57% to evict	Tico; 74% to evict	Mallandro; 48% to evict	Nany; 63% to evict	Dudu; 52% to evict	Viola; 76% to evict	Carrasco; 50.40% to evict	Andressa; 72% to evict	Janaína; 58% to evict	Carol; 50.20% to evict	Luiza; 50.70% to evict	Sérgio; 40% to win
Evicted	Monique; 56% to evict	Geisy; 57% to evict	Tico; 74% to evict	Mallandro; 48% to evict	Nany; 63% to evict	Dudu; 52% to evict	Viola; 76% to evict	Carrasco; 50.40% to evict	Andressa; 72% to evict	Janaína; 58% to evict	Carol; 50.20% to evict	Luiza; 50.70% to evict	Daniel; 44% to win

=== Notes ===
- ^Note 1: Janaína and Viola were tied with four votes each. First nominee Andressa had the casting vote and chose to nominate Janaína.
- ^Note 2: On weeks 8, 9 and 10, the Farmer of the Week vote has no longer the power to automatically nominate one contestant for eviction, only counting as a single vote. The immunity for the contestant remains and if at the end of the voting, the vote is tied, then is the Farmer of the Week who breaks the tie instead of the first nominee.
- ^Note 3: Andressa and Daniel were tied with three votes each. Farmer of the week Janaína had the casting vote and chose to nominate Andressa.
- ^Note 4: After winning the Farmer of the Week competition, Sérgio was instructed to save one contestant. He chose to save Luiza, putting Carol, Daniel and Lizi to compete in the Nomination challenge. Daniel won the challenge, therefore Carol and Lizi were automatically nominated.
- ^Note 5: The final four contestants competed in two final challenges for place in the final. Sérgio won the first and Daniel won the second challenge. Therefore, Lizi and Luiza were nominated for eviction.
- ^Note 6: For the final, the public votes for the contestant they want to win A Fazenda 3.
