= Sérgio Abreu (actor) =

Brazilian actor and reality television personality

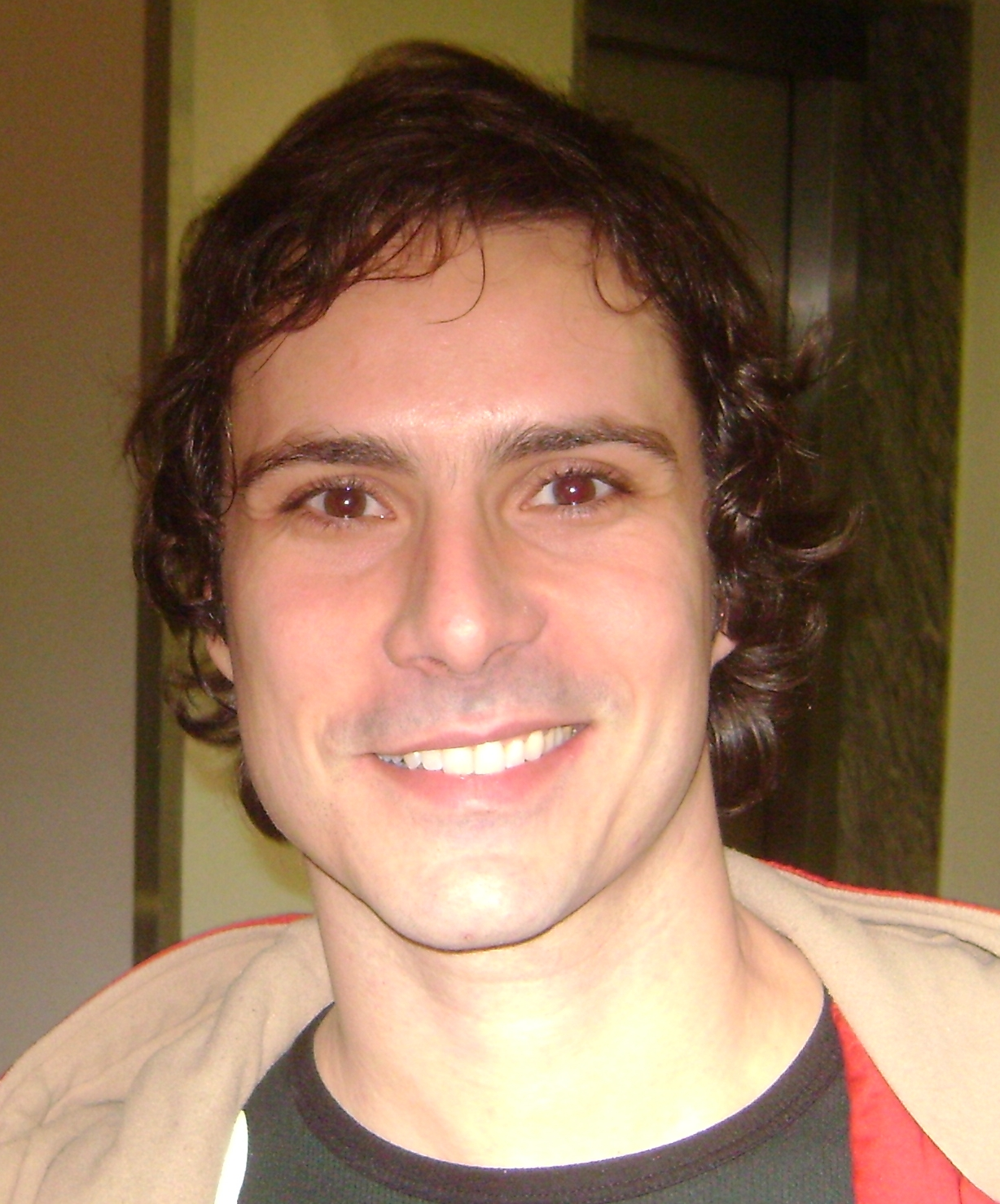
- Sérgio Abreu
- Born: Sérgio Luis Coutinho Abreu; October 16, 1975 (age 50); Rio de Janeiro, Brazil
- Occupations: Actor; musician
- Years active: 1996–present

Sérgio Abreu (born Sérgio Luis Coutinho Abreu; October 16, 1973 or 1975 in Rio de Janeiro) is a Brazilian actor, musician, and reality television personality, known for being a telenovela actor and the runner-up of the third season of A Fazenda, the Brazilian version of The Farm. A major role was in a gay couple with Carlos Casagrande in Paraíso Tropical in 2007.

== Career ==
He played Beto in telenovela Malhação from 2001-3, part of the central couple with Renata Dominguez as Solene. His breakout role was as hotel receptionist Tiago in Paraíso Tropical, though the depiction of his gay relationship with Rodrigo had little on-screen affection. He appeared in telenovela Revelação from the first episode in December 2008. In 2025 he appeared as Júlio in Paulo, O Apóstolo, marking twenty years of performances with the Record TV network since appearing as Murilo in Prova de Amor.

=== Television ===
| Year | Title | Role |
|---|---|---|
| 1996 | O Campeão | Rubinho |
| 1998 | Brida | Guilherme |
| 2001–2004 | Malhação | Beto |
| 2005–2006 | Prova de Amor | Murilo Vilaça |
| 2007 | Paraíso Tropical | Tiago Batista |
| 2008–2009 | Revelação | Lucas Nogueira |
| 2009–2010 | Vende-se um Véu de Noiva | Leonardo |
| 2010 | A Fazenda 3 | Himself |
| 2013 | Pecado Mortal | Enfermeiro (nurse) |
| 2014 | Milagres de Jesus | Jaime |
| 2014 | Conselho Tutelar | Ronaldo |
| 2018 | Jesus | Rafael |
| 2021 | Gênesis | Jubal |
| 2024 | A Rainha da Pérsia | Ramim |
| 2025 | Paolo, O Apóstolo | Júlio |

=== Film ===
| Year | Title | Role |
|---|---|---|
| 2002 | Vinte e Cinco | Rafa |
| 2006 | Zuzu Angel | Reporter |
| 2009 | Até Mais Tarde Ipanema | Branco |

=== A Fazenda ===
On September 28, 2010, Abreu was announced as one of fifteen celebrity contestants on the third season of A Fazenda, the Brazilian version of reality series The Farm, on Rede Record. Abreu finished as runner-up to model Daniel Bueno after 85 days on December 21, 2010.

== Theatre ==
In 2011, he played Ferdinand in "The Tempest" at Teatro Raul Cortez in São Paulo. In 2017 he appeared in "E aí, comeu?". In 2022, he was in "A Vingança de Shakespeare" at Teatro Vannucci in Rio de Janeiro.

== Music ==
Abreu studied music at conservatory. From 2007-9 he performed as the lead vocalist for the band Projeto SA. He released an album, "9". in 2018.

== Personal life ==
He holds Portuguese nationality through his grandfather. He is married to educator Priscila Queiroz Monteiro. For a short while up to 2015 he worked in real estate.
