= Renata Dominguez =

Brazilian actress (born 1980)

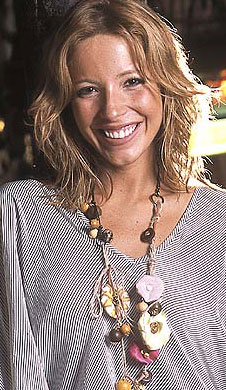
- Born: Renata Santos Dominguez; 8 March 1980 (age 45); Río de Janeiro, Río de Janeiro, Brazil
- Occupation(s): Actress, television presenter
- Years active: 1993–present
- Spouses: Edson Spinello (m. 2013; div. 2015); Leandro Gléria (m. 2021)
- Children: 1

Renata Santos Dominguez (born 8 March 1980) is a Brazilian actress and television presenter.

== Career ==
Dominguez spent her childhood in Goiás, where she studied at a convent school, before moving to Ecuador at the age of 13 with her family.

Dominguez's career on television is divided into two stages: as a television presenter in Ecuador, from 1993 to 1999, and as an actress in Brazil, from 2000 onwards. At the age of 13, she began her career in Ecuador, when her father was transferred to the country for work. She was taking a dance class when she was called to audition for a children's and youth program on a local station. However, the audition for the program's group of dancers turned into a position as presenter. She hosted game shows, children's shows, intercollegiate shows, variety shows, live and recorded, daily and weekly, recorded some songs and toured the country. In total, she made six shows on three different channels (Ecuavisa, Teleamazonas and SiTv), was a UNICEF ambassador in Ecuador and the official representative of The Walt Disney Company in the country. The fact that she was Brazilian was credited with boosting her career in a country marked by the rivalry between its main regions (the coastal Guayaquil and the mountainous Quito). Being a foreigner, the she was free from any regional prejudice and was accepted nationwide.

Back in Brazil, she joined the theater group Tablado and was cast in the play Jonas e a Baleia, a biblical spectacle of Maria Clara Machado. Afterwards she did the show Navalha na Carne, where she played Neusa. She auditioned for the Spanish-language Vale todo in 2001, and ended up being cast in Malhação, staying on the air for years. Due to the latter's success, she was signed by Rede Record, where he participated in soap operas A Escrava Isaura, Prova de Amor, Bicho do Mato, Amor e Intrigas, Promessas de Amor, and the miniseries Rei Davi. In 2014, she made her film debut, playing Valentina, in the film Vestido pra Casar. In 2016, she took part in Malhação: Seu Lugar no Mundo, playing the character Suzana. Then, she played the character Sirlene, in the soap opera Sol Nascente.

In 2021, she made her return to TV where she was confirmed for the talent show Bake Off Celebridades, where she was runner-up. On April of the same year, she was confirmed together with her husband Leandro Gléria for the fifth season of the reality show Power Couple Brasil in Record. They were the ninth couple eliminated from the program with 28.73% of the votes tagainst Li Martins & JP Mantovani and Matheus Yurley & Mari Matarazzo, finishing in 5th place in the competition.

== Personal life ==
In 2003, she began dating director Edson Spinello, the director of Malhação, dating for almost ten years before marrying on January 31, 2013. After twelve years of relationship, the couple divorced in 2015. In 2019, she began a relationship with public relations professional Leandro Gléria, whom she married on March 20, 2021.

On July 21, 2022, she publicly announced on her social media that she was expecting her first child with her husband Leandro Gléria.

== Filmography ==
=== Television ===
Year	Title	Role	Notes	Ref.
1993–94	Barra libre	Presenter		
1994	El ascensor musical	Presenter		
1995	Club Disney	Presenter		
1995	Club Disney Tazos	Presenter		
1996	El rey de la playa	Presenter		
1997–99	Samba-K-Nuta	Presenter		
2001–04	Malhação	Solene "Sol" Ribeiro da Silva	Seasons 8–10	
2004	A Escrava Isaura	Branca Villela		
2005	Prova de Amor	Patrícia "Paty" Lopo		
2006	Bicho do Mato	Cecília de Sá Freitas		
2007	Amor e Intrigas	Valquíria Pereira		
2009	Promessas de Amor	Sofia Drumont Cordeiro		
2012	Rei Davi	Bathsheba		
2013	Casamento Blindado	Clarinha		
2015	Na Mira do Crime	Luana		
2015	Tomara que Caia	Alice Gomes	Episode: "Quem não Morre não Vê Deus"	
2016	Malhação: Seu Lugar no Mundo	Suzana	Episode: "26-28 de janeiro"	
2016	Sol Nascente	Sirlene da Silva		
2017	Super Chef Celebridades	Contestant	Season 6	
2018	Deus Salve o Rei	Belisa		
2020	Os Roni	Isadora	Episodio: "Esse Brechó é uma Viagem"	
2021	Bake Off Celebridades	Contestant	Season 1	
2021	Power Couple	Contestant	Season 5	

=== Film ===
Year	Title	Role	Ref.
2014	Vestido pra Casar	Valentina	

== Theatre ==
Year	Title	Role	Ref.
2000	Navalha na Carne	Neusa Sueli	
2000–01	Jonas e a Baleia	Nineveh Dancer	
2002	Quatro Amores	Patrícia	

== Awards and nominations ==
Year	Award	Category	Work	Result	Ref.
2006	Prêmio Contigo! de TV	Best Supporting Actress	Prova de Amor	Nominated	
2007	Prêmio Contigo! de TV	Best Romantic Couple (with André Bankoff)	Bicho do Mato	Nominated	
2008	Premio Extra de Televisão	Best Actress	Amor e Intrigas	Nominated	
2008	Prêmio Contigo! de TV	Best Actress	Amor e Intrigas	Nominated	
2012	Prêmio Master de Qualidade	Best Actress	Rei Davi	Won	
2013	Prêmio Contigo! de TV	Best Actress in a Series or Miniseries	Rei Davi	Nominated	
