= Monique Evans =

Brazilian television personality

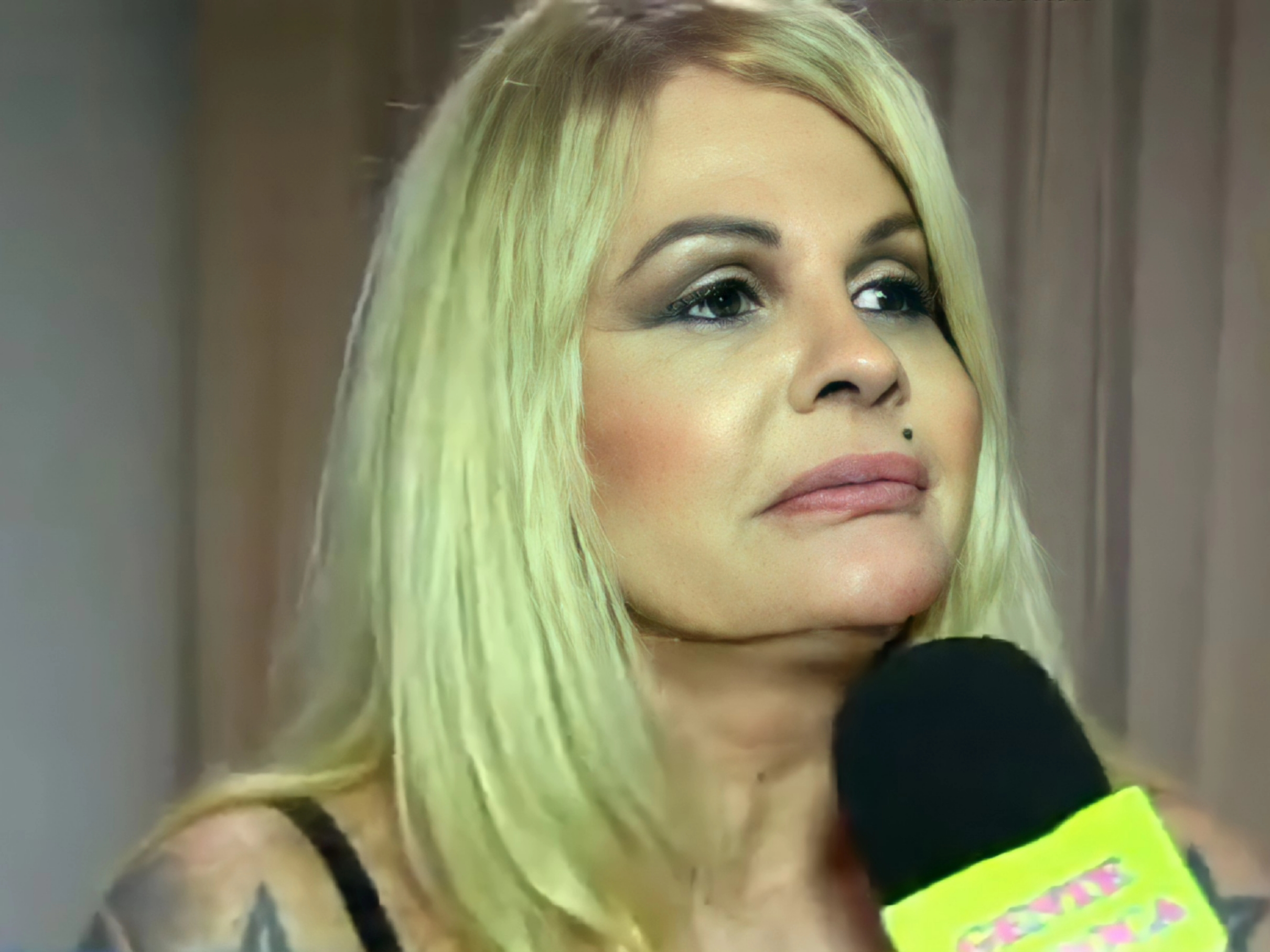
- Evans in 2018
- Born: Monique Rezende Nery da Fonseca; 5 July 1956 (age 70); Rio de Janeiro, Brazil
- Occupations: TV personality, host, actress
- Children: Armando Aguinaga; Bárbara Evans

Monique Evans (born Monique Rezende Nery da Fonseca on 5 July 1956) is a Brazilian television personality and former model. She was a participant on the third and fourth seasons of A Fazenda.

== A Fazenda ==
On 28 September 2010, Monique Evans was officially announced as one of the fifteen celebrities contestants on the third season of A Fazenda, the Brazilian version of reality series The Farm, which aired on Rede Record.

During her time in the farm she got involved in arguments with fellow contestants Dudu Pelizzari and Nany People. On 4 October 2010, after 10 days, she was the first celebrity to be evicted despite being one of the most notorious cast members of the bunch.

Monique got a second chance on 19 July 2011, when she was officially announced as one of the fifteen celebrities contestants on the fourth season of the show. This time, she went all the way to end, finished as runner-up to personal trainer and model Joana Machado after 87 days on 12 October 2011.

== Personal life ==
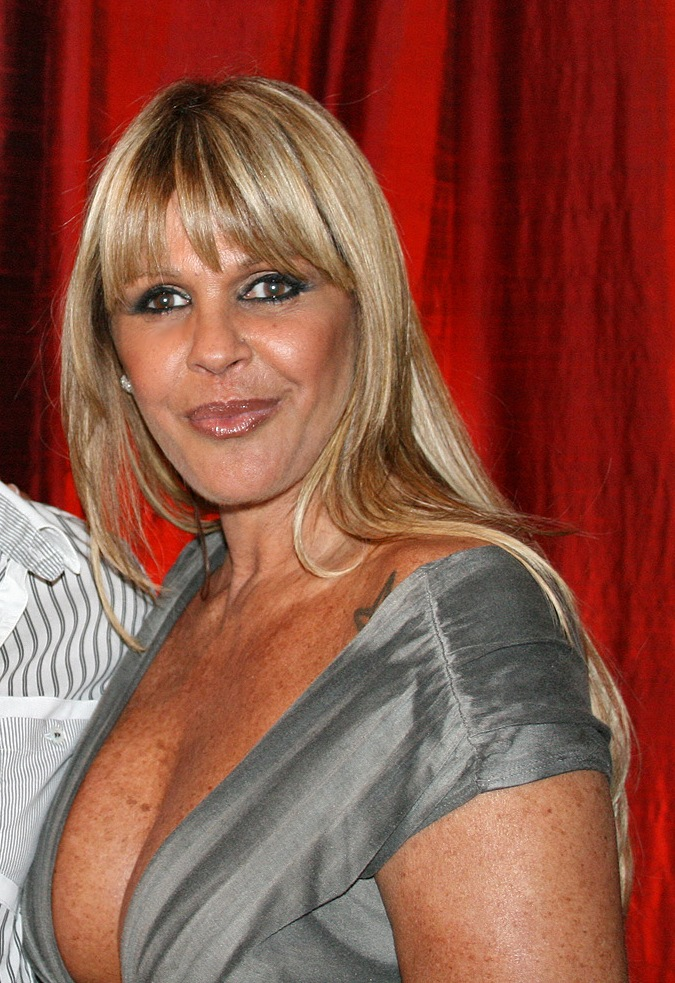
Evans in 2008

In February 2015, Evans began a same-sex relationship with DJ Cacá Werneck, whom she met in 2014 in the psychiatric clinic where she was admitted for treat her depression.

== Filmography ==
Television
Year	Title	Role
1981	O Amor é Nosso	Monah
1983	Domingo Bingo	Main Host
1986	Hipertensão	Alaíde
1986	Cambalacho	Pâmela
1986–1989	Chico Anysio Show	Shirley
1991	O Guarani	Truíra
1996	Chico Total	Domestic worker
1998–2000	De Noite na Cama	Main Host
2000	TV Fama	Main Host
2001–2004	Noite Afora	Main Host
2005	A Casa é Sua	Main Host
2006–2010	TV Fama	Reporter
2008	Alice	Sil
2010	A Fazenda 3	Contestant
2011	A Fazenda 4	Contestant
2012	Sexo a 3	Reporter

Film
Year	Title	Role
1984	Aguenta Coração	Laura
1986	Sexo Frágil	Cristina
1987	Eu	Diana
1988	Fogo e Paixão	Monique
1990	O Escorpião Escarlate	Lady Ming
2018	PRO	Sarah
