= Machado, Minas Gerais =

Coordinates: 21.675°S 45.92°W

- Municipality
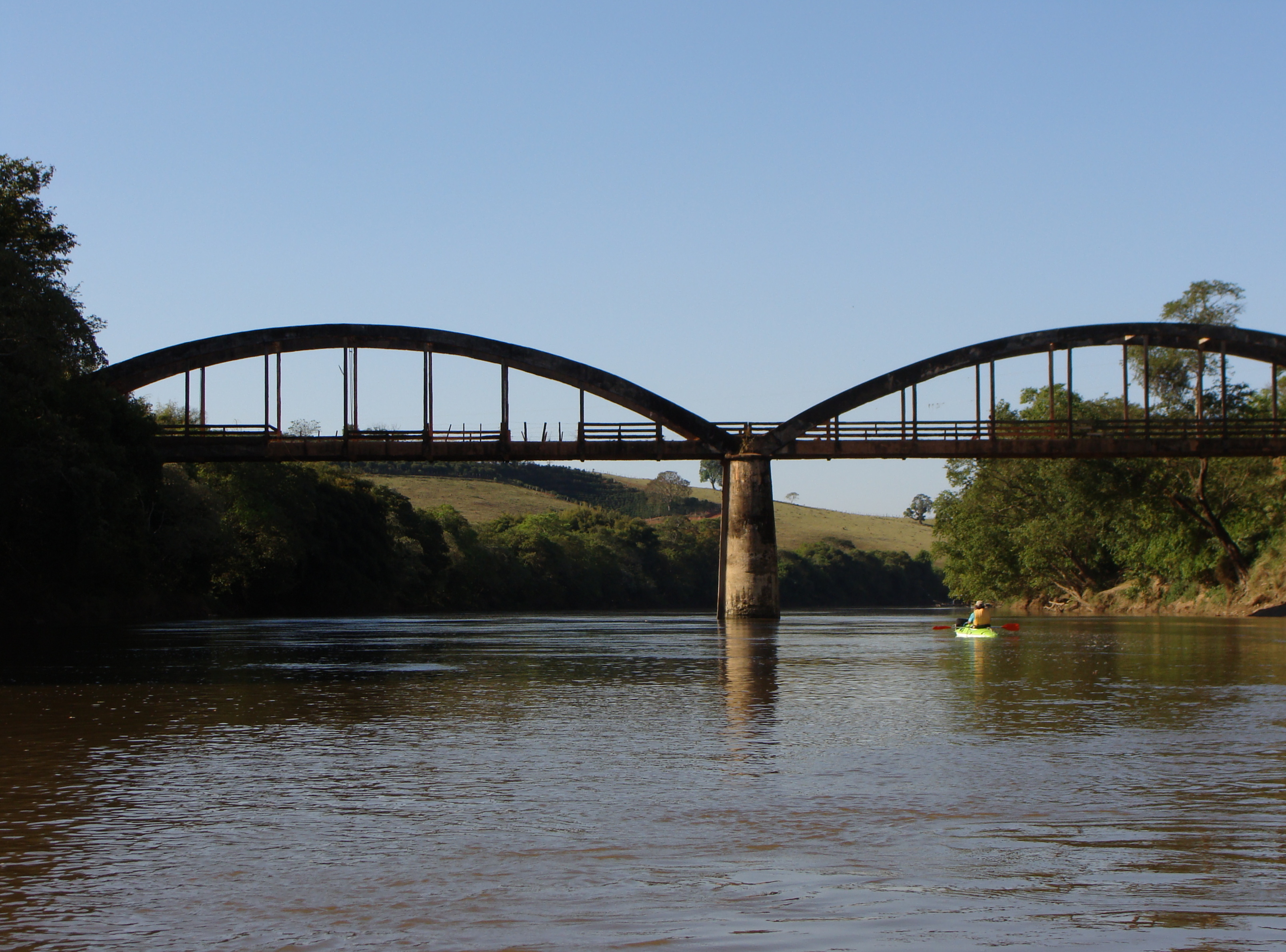
- Bridge connecting Cordislândia-MG to Machado-MG

- Flag Coat of arms
- Interactive map of Machado, Minas Gerais
- Country: Brazil
- Region: Southeast
- State: Minas Gerais
- Mesoregion: Oeste de Minas

Government
  - Mayor: Julert Ferri (PMDB)

Population (2020)
  - Total: 42,413
- Time zone: UTC−3 (BRT)

Machado is a municipality in the state of Minas Gerais in the Southeast region of Brazil.

== Geography ==
=== Climate ===
Climate data for Machado (1991–2020)
Month	Jan	Feb	Mar	Apr	May	Jun	Jul	Aug	Sep	Oct	Nov	Dec	Year
Mean daily maximum °C (°F)	29.4 (84.9)	29.7 (85.5)	29.0 (84.2)	28.1 (82.6)	25.4 (77.7)	24.6 (76.3)	25.0 (77.0)	27.0 (80.6)	28.4 (83.1)	29.1 (84.4)	28.5 (83.3)	29.2 (84.6)	27.8 (82.0)
Daily mean °C (°F)	22.9 (73.2)	22.9 (73.2)	22.3 (72.1)	20.8 (69.4)	17.7 (63.9)	16.3 (61.3)	16.3 (61.3)	17.9 (64.2)	20.3 (68.5)	21.8 (71.2)	21.9 (71.4)	22.7 (72.9)	20.3 (68.5)
Mean daily minimum °C (°F)	18.6 (65.5)	18.3 (64.9)	17.7 (63.9)	15.5 (59.9)	12.0 (53.6)	10.1 (50.2)	9.6 (49.3)	10.5 (50.9)	13.6 (56.5)	16.1 (61.0)	17.2 (63.0)	18.2 (64.8)	14.8 (58.6)
Average precipitation mm (inches)	282.8 (11.13)	212.9 (8.38)	176.0 (6.93)	68.5 (2.70)	62.0 (2.44)	23.3 (0.92)	19.4 (0.76)	17.1 (0.67)	70.9 (2.79)	115.6 (4.55)	174.8 (6.88)	240.6 (9.47)	1,463.9 (57.63)
Average precipitation days (≥ 1.0 mm)	17.9	14.0	13.2	7.2	4.4	2.5	2.2	2.4	5.9	10.3	13.2	16.8	110.0
Average relative humidity (%)	81.2	79.4	80.6	79.5	79.7	79.6	75.1	67.5	67.0	71.3	76.8	80.2	76.5
Average dew point °C (°F)	19.9 (67.8)	19.7 (67.5)	19.5 (67.1)	17.9 (64.2)	15.1 (59.2)	13.9 (57.0)	13.1 (55.6)	13.2 (55.8)	14.8 (58.6)	17.1 (62.8)	18.3 (64.9)	19.5 (67.1)	16.8 (62.2)
Mean monthly sunshine hours	141.0	151.6	156.2	175.5	173.6	160.8	183.7	208.5	170.8	169.9	146.8	143.9	1,982.3
Source: NOAA

== See also ==
- Afro-Brazilian
- List of municipalities in Minas Gerais
