= Joana Machado =

Brazilian television personality

- Born: Joana Machado Neves; 13 November 1980 (age 45); Rio de Janeiro, Brazil
- Occupation: Television personality
- Years active: 2011–present
- Partner: Adriano (2008−2010)
- Children: 2

Joana Machado (born Joana Machado Neves on 13 November 1980) is a Brazilian reality television personality, best known for being the winner of the fourth season of A Fazenda, the Brazilian version of The Farm.

== Career ==
Joana Machado brought to media attention in 2008 following her on-and-off affair with football player Adriano, marked by scandals and mutual aggression. These headlines made her into a media personality.

Since then, she appeared on several television shows, magazine covers (which included a nude photoshoot for Sexxy magazine in March 2011) and other media.

=== A Fazenda ===
On 19 July 2011, Joana Machado was officially announced as one of the fifteen celebrities contestants on the fourth season of A Fazenda, the Brazilian version of reality series The Farm, which aired on Rede Record.

On 12 October 2011, after 87 days, she was crowned the winner of the season, beating TV host Monique Evans and sexual blogger Raquel Pacheco in the final vote, taking home the R$2 million prize.

On 27 October 2011, she became a cast member of Legendários, Marcos Mion Saturday night comedy show, where she currently works as a correspondent. Her first episode aired 5 November 2011.

=== Filmography ===
Television
Year	Title	Role
2011	A Fazenda 4	Herself
2011–2012	Legendários	Herself

Preceded by Daniel Bueno	Winner of A Fazenda; A Fazenda 4	Succeeded by Viviane Araújo
