= Barbosa Ferraz =

Barbosa Ferraz may refer to:

- Salomão Barbosa Ferraz (1880–1969), Brazilian priest and bishop
- Barbosa Ferraz, Paraná

== See also ==
- Barbosa (disambiguation)
- Ferraz
