= Brasileirinhas =

Brazilian pornographic film studio

- Industry: Pornography
- Founded: 1996; 30 years ago
- Headquarters: São Paulo, Brazil
- Key people: Clayton Nunes
- Products: Pornographic films
- Website: www.brasileirinhas.com.br

Brasileirinhas is a Brazilian pornographic film studio Considered the largest in the industry in the country, it has more than 4,000 titles in its collection and was founded by Luis Alvarenga in mid-1996.

Brasileirinhas label has some of the most famous pornographic performers of Brazil including Monica Mattos, Pâmela Butt , Júlia Paes, Patrícia Kimberly, Mônica Santhiago, Nikki Rio, Lana Starck, Verônica Bella, Cyane Lima, Mayara Rodrigues, Anne Midori (Yumi Saito), Babalú, Sílvia Saenz, Tamiry Chiavari, Gina Jolie, Melissa Pitanga, with prominent male performer Kid Bengala.

It is also well known for its films featuring celebrities trying to reclaim stardom to keep them on the highlight of the masses like Gretchen, Gretchen's son Thammy Miranda, Rita Cadillac, Alexandre Frota, Regininha Poltergeist, Leila Lopes, Mateus Carrieri or minor TV celebrities such as Vivi Fernandez (É o Tchan! dancer nominee), Luanda Boaz (É o Tchan! dancer contest finalist), Márcia Imperator, Bruna Ferraz, and Bianca Soares.

In April 2011, there were reports that Brasileirinhas would be closed down and its assets would be sold to Sexy Hot (Brazilian TV channel). However, the current owner, Clayton Nunes, denied allegations, and the company remains opened, working in both internet and newsstands markets, besides rental market in sex shops and video stores.

== See also ==
- La Conga Sex
