= La Conga Sex =

- Directed by: J. Gaspar
- Starring: Gretchen; Guto Guitar
- Production company: Brasileirinhas
- Release date: 2006
- Running time: 90 minutes
- Country: Brazil
- Language: Portuguese

La Conga Sex is a 2006 Brazilian pornographic film produced by Brasileirinhas and starring singer Gretchen and guitarist Guto Guitar. The title references the famous song "Conga, Conga, Conga", a hit from the 1980s.

== Production ==
After negotiations, Gretchen signed with the production company Brasileirinhas in September 2006.

I finalized everything yesterday. The production company accepted my terms, and I said yes. First of all, I don't consider this a pornographic film. That's because I'll be performing it with my fiancé. It's just me and him, no other women or men. The story is like our honeymoon, and we'll do everything a normal couple does. Of course, there will be sex scenes—they're 15 minutes long. But there will also be a sequence where I belly dance for him and another where I parade in lingerie.

— Gretchen

La Conga Sex had scenes filmed in Recife and São Paulo. After filming, Gretchen revealed that a play starring her and Guto was in development.

== Reception ==
The film was well received by audiences but received criticism for its limited sex scenes. Nevertheless, it became one of the production company's most successful titles, surpassing Rita Cadillac and Alexandre Frota in the rankings and breaking pre-sale records. Gretchen declared herself happy with the work and performed at nightclubs to promote the film.

The DVD of La Conga Sex sold 120,000 copies, and in 2019, the film was the most-watched in Brasileirinhas' online catalog.

== Controversy ==
Although La Conga Sex contains several explicit sex scenes, Gretchen has always denied that it is pornography. In 2010, she revealed that she regretted starring in the film and that she had never seen it. During her participation in the Brazilian reality show A Fazenda 5 (2012), the singer said that she accepted the offer from Brasileirinhas only for the R$1 million fee. She reaffirmed her regret in the biography Gretchen, Uma Biografia Quase Não Autorizada, released in 2015.
