= Márcia Imperator =

Brazilian actress, pornographic actress, model and TV personality

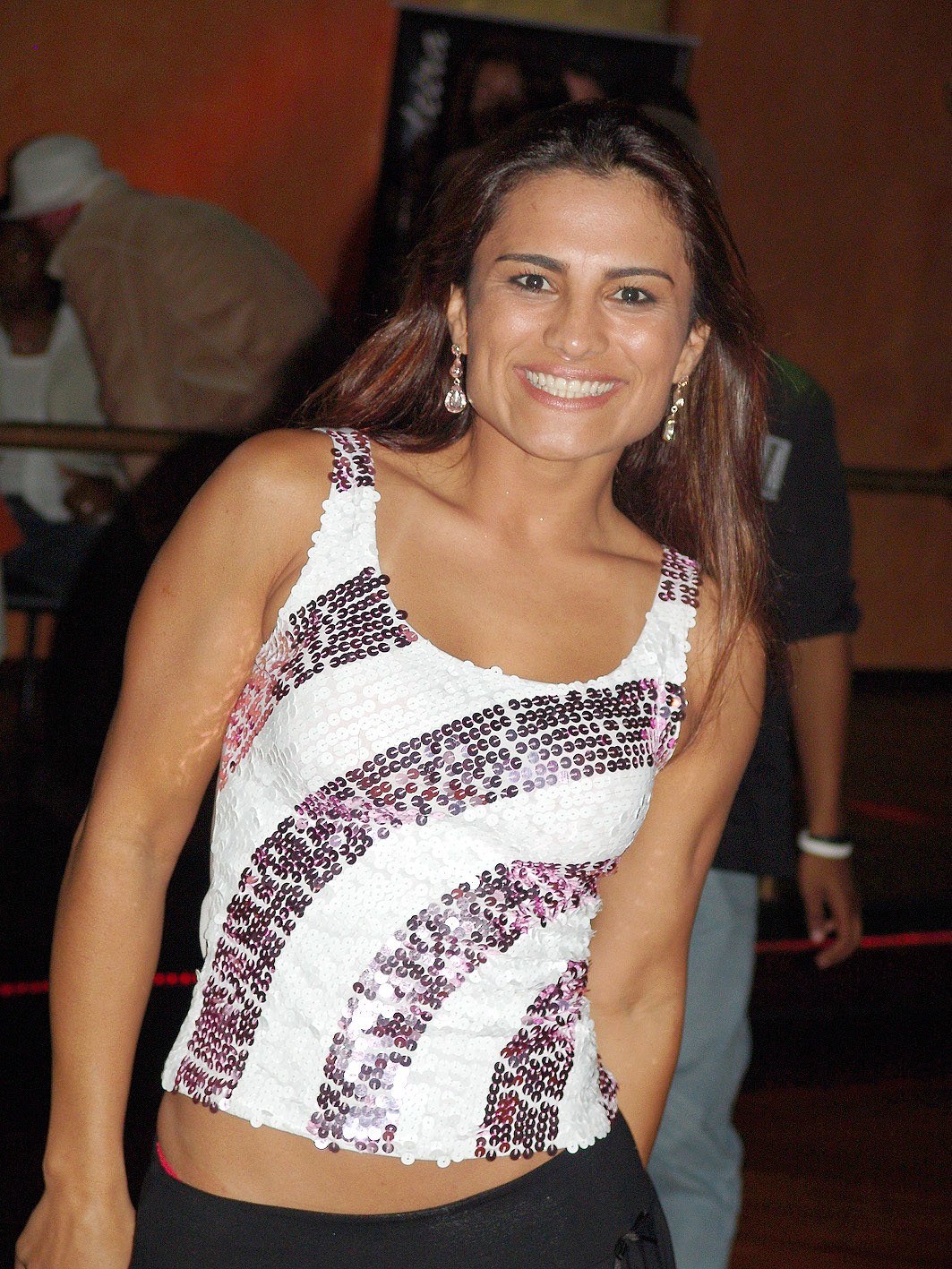
- Imperator in 2005
- Born: Bela Vista do Paraíso, Brazil
- Occupation(s): Actress, pornographic actress, model, TV personality

Márcia Maria Imperator is a Brazilian actress, pornographic actress, model, and TV personality.

== Background ==
Born in Bela Vista do Paraíso, Imperator started her career taking part to several episodes of the Rede Globo comedy show Zorra Total, then appeared in the 2003 Rede Gazeta show Programa Sérgio Mallandro. She gained notoriety for taking part in the late-night TV show Eu Vi na TV hosted by João Kléber, starring in the segment Teste de Fidelidade.

After the end of the show in 2005, Imperator entered the adult industry with the film Fidelidade à prova, later starred in a number of pornographic films, mainly for the company Brasileirinhas. In 2008 she re-joined the cast of Zorra Total.

She also posed for several men's magazines covers, such as Premium and Ele & Ela.

Imperator lives in Florianópolis; she has three children.
