= Ferraz =

Ferraz is a Portuguese surname. Notable people with the surname include:

- Afonso Ferraz (born 1964), Angolan sprinter
- Antonio Ferraz (born 1929), Spanish road racing cyclist
- Artur Ivens Ferraz (1870–1933), Portuguese military officer and politician
- Bruna Ferraz (born 1981), Brazilian adult model, pornographic actress and television personality
- Carolina Ferraz (born 1968), Brazilian actress, television presenter and former model
- Esther Figueiredo Ferraz (1916–2008), Brazilian politician
- Filipe Ferraz (born 1980), Brazilian volleyball player
- Gastão de Freitas Ferraz, Portuguese spy
- Guilherme Ivens Ferraz (1865–1956), Portuguese Navy officer
- J. A. Beleza Ferraz (1901−?), Portuguese military personnel
- Joaquim Ferraz (born 1974), Portuguese footballer
- Jose Ferraz (born 1949), Portuguese football player and manager
- Jurema Ferraz (born 1985), Angolan model and beauty pageant titleholder
- Kiros Stanlley Soares Ferraz (born 1988), Brazilian football
- Lucas Ferraz Vila (born 1998), Argentine footballer
- Luís Ferraz (born 1987), Portuguese footballer
- Luís Antônio de Carvalho Ferraz (1940–1982), Brazilian Navy officer
- Matheus Ferraz (born 1985), Brazilian footballer
- Salomão Barbosa Ferraz (1880–1969), Brazilian priest and bishop
- Sílvio Ferraz (born 1959), Brazilian composer
- Tercio Sampaio Ferraz Jr., Brazilian jurist and author
- Valentín Ferraz y Barrau (1792–1866), Spanish military commander and politician
- Walter Ferraz de Negreiros (born 1946), Brazilian retired footballer

== See also ==
- Ferraz de Vasconcelos
