= Alvaro Piaggio =

Senior policy analyst

Alvaro Piaggio is a senior policy analyst at the Human Rights Foundation (HRF), where he heads the group's research and campaigns in the Americas. He also runs the Responsible Finance program, which educates would-be investors on the dangers of investing in nations with authoritarian governments.

Piaggio has a business and economics background with experience in human rights and pro-democracy in Latin America. He has penned several articles on a wide range of topics, from the war on drugs to the threat of authoritarian regimes to world order.
