= Chrystian (singer) =

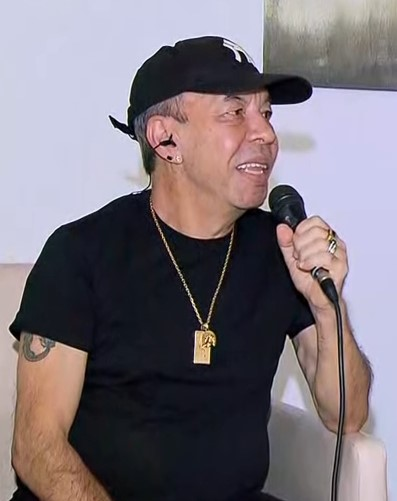
- Chrystian in 2021

Background information
- Born: José Pereira da Silva Neto; 3 November 1956; Goiânia, Goiás, Brazil
- Died: 19 June 2024 (aged 67) São Paulo, São Paulo, Brazil
- Genres: Sertanejo
- Occupations: Singer, songwriter, musician
- Instrument: Vocals
- Years active: 1973–2024

José Pereira da Silva Neto (3 November 1956 – 19 June 2024), better known by the stage name Chrystian, was a Brazilian singer of the sertanejo genre. With his brother Ralf he was part of the duo Chrystian & Ralf.

== "Don't Say Goodbye" ==
In 1973 Chrystian scored his first hit with "Don't Say Goodbye". The song spent 19 weeks at number 1 on the charts. But despite the huge success, Chrystian still faced financial difficulties.

Obliged to sing in English due to the fad of the record companies, at first he appeared almost as a "ghost" singer, since on the cover of his debut album, instead of his own photo, a model was used. He also couldn't appear on television so they wouldn't know he was a Brazilian singer. At that time, his main songs were:

- "Don't Say Goodbye"
- "Tears"
- "More Than You Know"
- "Everywhere"
- "Lies"
- "Emotions In My Heart"
- "Shadows"

== Chrystian & Ralf duo ==
In the early 1980s Chrystian and Ralf finally decided to record country music. In December 1999 they announced their separation, which greatly shook fans and the artistic environment. In 2000 Chrystian released the CD Beijo Final under the BMG label, which circulated for two years. In the same year he participated on the vocals of his own composition "Tarde Demais" on a CD by Zezé Di Camargo & Luciano. In May 2001 the duo returned to form a partnership. In 2007, nine years after their first acoustic work, the duo released Acústico 2. The album, that hit the market on SMD and SMDV, is Power Records' first release in that format.

== Solo career ==
At the end of 2021 Chrystian announced that he would pursue a solo career for five years. His first tour was called "Romance".

== Personal life and death ==
Chrystian had dyslexia. In 1981 he married singer Gretchen. The relationship came to an end after a few months because of Chrystian's infidelity; Gretchen stated that he was involved with some Chacrete dancers. Chrystian was married to Key Vieira (Cassilândia, January 1970). In a 2006 interview he said he met his wife in Cassilândia.

In 2024 Chrystian shared that he had polycystic kidney disease, a congenital disorder. He died on 19 June 2024, at the age of 67.

== Discography ==
=== Albums ===
- 1973 – Don't Say Goodbye
- 1976 – Made In USA
- 2000 – Beijo Final

=== Singles and EPs ===
- 1973 – Don't Say Goodbye
- 1973 – No Broken Heart, So Don't Try
- 1973 – For Better
- 1973 – Don't Say Goodbye/Try/For Better/Question Mark
- 1974 – Tears/Love Me More and More
- 1975 – More Than You Know/Swingin'
- 1975 – Shadows/My Life
- 1975 – Lagrimas/Quiereme Mas
- 1977 – You´re So Tender/Secrets in Your Eyes/Love´s a Dream/Fly/
- 1977 – Love Song/Tears
- 1978 – Bird Songs/She´s My World
- 1978 – Diana Ross & The Supremes / Chrystian / Charo & The Salsoul Orchestra / Michael Jackson – Pro Som and Top Tape- Pro Som e Top Tape
- 1979 – Lies/Sky Fly
- 1980 – Emotions In My Heart/Never Thought I'd Say Goodbye
- 1981 – Sorrows/Everywhere
- 1982 – Good Old (Fashioned Rock'n Roll) / Things

=== Compilations ===
- 1983 – Chrystian – 10 Anos Depois
