= Júlia Paes =

Brazilian model, singer and former adult actress

Gislaine Fernandes de Sousa Leme (born 22 May 1986), best known as Júlia Paes, is a Brazilian model, singer and former adult actress.

== Career ==
Born in São Paulo, Gislaine started her career at 12 as a model then, with the stage name Michelle Alves, she appeared in the opening of the telenovela Belíssima in 2006 and took part in the 2007 summer edition of the São Paulo Fashion Week.

Dissatisfied with the name, she later chose the stage name Júlia Paes as a reference to actress Juliana Paes. Júlia attracted the attention of Brazilian media because of her romantic relationship with Thammy Miranda, son of singer Gretchen, then started a career in the adult industry as an actress and adult model.

In 2009, she was elected by the newspaper A Folha dos Motoristas as "Queen of Taxi Drivers" and crowned by the Governor of São Paulo, Geraldo Alckmin. The same year Paes paraded with the Samba School Praiana in the Carnival of Porto Alegre.

In 2009, Júlia also started her music career as lead singer of "Sexy Dolls", a girl group inspired by Pussycat Dolls consisting of her, Carol Miranda and Sabrina Boing. Júlia left "Sexy Dolls" at the end of the same year, motivated by the desire to develop other projects and with doubts about the direction the trio was taking.

Júlia currently is a singer of forró genre. Her debut album was released in late 2010 and a follow-up album was released at the end of 2011. Julia also makes appearances as a DJ.

== Personal life ==
After becoming a born-again Christian, she left the porn industry in 2010, and married businessman Gabriel Ribeiro, with whom she had a daughter.

== TV personality 'Double' ==
According to an article published on Brazilian news websites her real name is actually Laíne Souza and that 'Julia' was in essence a fictional character created for entertainment purposes, much in the same way John Lydon of the Sex Pistols was portrayed as the fictional Johnny Rotten.
