= Thammy Miranda =

Brazilian actor, reporter and politician (born 1982)

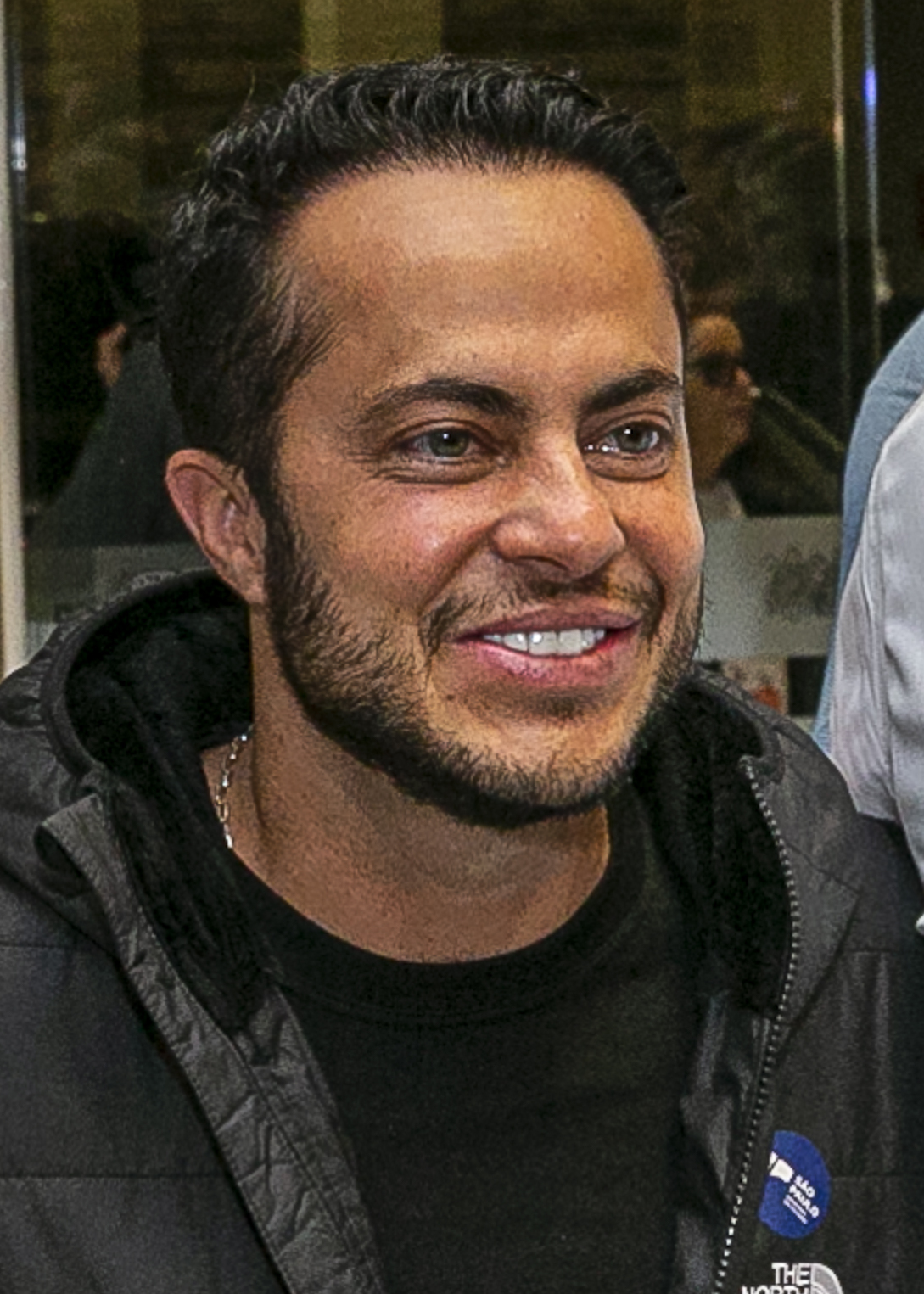

Councillor of São Paulo
- Incumbent
- Assumed office 1 January 2021
- Constituency: At-large

Personal details
- Born: Thammy Brito de Miranda Silva; 3 September 1982 (age 44) São Paulo, Brazil
- Party: PSD (2024–present)
- Other political affiliations: PP (2007–09; 2015–18); PSC (2009–11); PL (2011–15; 2020–24); PSB (2018–20)
- Spouses: Janaína Cinci (m. 2010; div. 2010) Andressa Ferreira (m. 2018)
- Children: Bento (b. 2020)
- Relatives: Gretchen (mother); Sula Miranda (aunt)
- Occupation: Actor, reporter, politician
- Known for: Jô, in Salve Jorge

Thammy Brito de Miranda Silva (born 3 September 1982) is a Brazilian actor, reporter and politician. He began his career in the entertainment industry, performing as a singer, model and dancer, before turning to acting and politics. He is the son of singer Gretchen and nephew of singer Sula Miranda.

== Career ==
Miranda released his CD entitled Lindo Anjo in 2001, by record label MCK. He became famous with songs "Fala Pra Ele" (which was recorded by his mom in the same year) and the re-recording of the song "Mordida de Amor" by Banda Yahoo. He also succeeded with an original song called "Vivendo Assim" and "Vai" (written by his aunt). Before coming out as transgender, he was a dancer in his mom's presentations and was photographed naked for Sexy magazine.

Between 2007 and 2008, he acted in three pornographic films: Sádica, Thammy & Cia and A Stripper dos Seus Sonhos.

In 2012, Miranda was in the cast of Brazilian soap opera Salve Jorge, written by Glória Perez. In 2013, he did a test was hired to be a reporter in the reality Famoso Quem? of SBT.

In 2016, he was invited by writer Glória Perez to be cast in her new soap opera A Força do Querer, of Rede Globo, but refused due to his political campaign for City Councillor. In May 2017, Miranda debuted in theaters with the play T.R.A.N.S.: Terapia de Relacionamentos Amorosos Neuróticos Sexuais, which was cancelled in June, after divergencies with director Carlos Verahnnay.

In 2018, he was nominated by Isto É Gente magazine for the award of "Sexiest Man of the Year".

== Politics ==
Miranda ran for a seat as a councillor in the 2016 municipal election representing the Progressive Party (PP). He garnered 12,408 votes, being the second most voted of his party, but wasn't elected. In February 2019, he would assume a seat in the Municipal Chamber of São Paulo, after the election of Conte Lopes to the State Legislative Assembly, but a decision from the Superior Electoral Court made his swearing-in impossible. In 2020, Miranda was candidate for the Municipal Chamber by the Liberal Party and was elected, being one of the first transgender councillors of São Paulo, alongside Erika Hilton (PSOL). In March 2024, he decided to join the Social Democratic Party (PSD).

== Personal life ==
After coming out as lesbian in 2006, Miranda cut his long hair and began using male clothes. In a statement, his mother said that, since he was a child, Miranda had preferences for male clothes and hated dolls and skirts. About his sexual orientation, Miranda said:

It is not an option. I think that who is gay is born this way, I was born this way. We are raised learning that the correct is that there is a boy and there is a girl. It's hard to change this.

In the end of 2014, Miranda came out as transgender. In the same year, he began hormone replacement therapy to support his transition. In December 2014, Miranda got gender-affirming surgery, specifically top surgery (double mastectomy).

Miranda has had many relationships. In 2006, after coming out, he dated model Patrícia Jorge, who acted in the TV show Boa Noite Brasil. Starting on October 5, 2006 and into the next year, he had a relationship with porn actress Júlia Paes. On September 3, 2010, on his 29th birthday, he had an intimate marriage ceremony with Janaína Cinci, but they divorced three months later. In December 2013, he began dating model Andressa Ferreira, marrying her on 16 March 2018.

After an in vitro fertilisation, his wife Andressa got pregnant. She was inseminated with her own egg and the sperm from an anonymous donor. The child, Bento Ferreira de Miranda, was born from a caesarean section in Miami, on 8 January 2020.

== Lawsuit ==
In August 2020, Thammy Miranda sued Pastor Silas Malafaia, accusing him of transphobia, after Malafaia urged consumers to boycott cosmetics company Natura which had hired Miranda for their Father's Day campaign.

In response to CPI das ONGs do Centro, in which Thammy was a signator, the priest Júlio Lancellotti solidarized with Thammy.

== Filmography ==
=== Television ===
Year	Title	Role	Note
1998	Fantasia	Garota Fantasia	
2012	Salve Jorge	Joyce Guimarães (Jô/Lohana/Cylmara de Sousa)	
2013	Famoso Quem?	Reporter/Presenter	
2014–17	Programa Raul Gil	Reporter	"Elas Querem Saber"

=== Movies ===
Year	Title	Role	Note
2010	Gretchen: Filme Estrada	Himself	Documentary
2014	Copa de Elite	Navalhada	

==== Pornographic movies ====
Year	Title	Role	Note
2007	Sádica	Thammy	Also director
2008	Thammy & Cia	Thammy	Also director
2008	A Stripper dos Seus Sonhos	Thammy	Also director

== Discography ==
Year	Studio album
2001	Lindo Anjo: Singles: "Ai é de Babar"; "Fala Pra Ele"; "Mordida de Amor"; "Vivendo Assim"; "Vai"; "Cola na Minha"
