= Ralf (singer) =

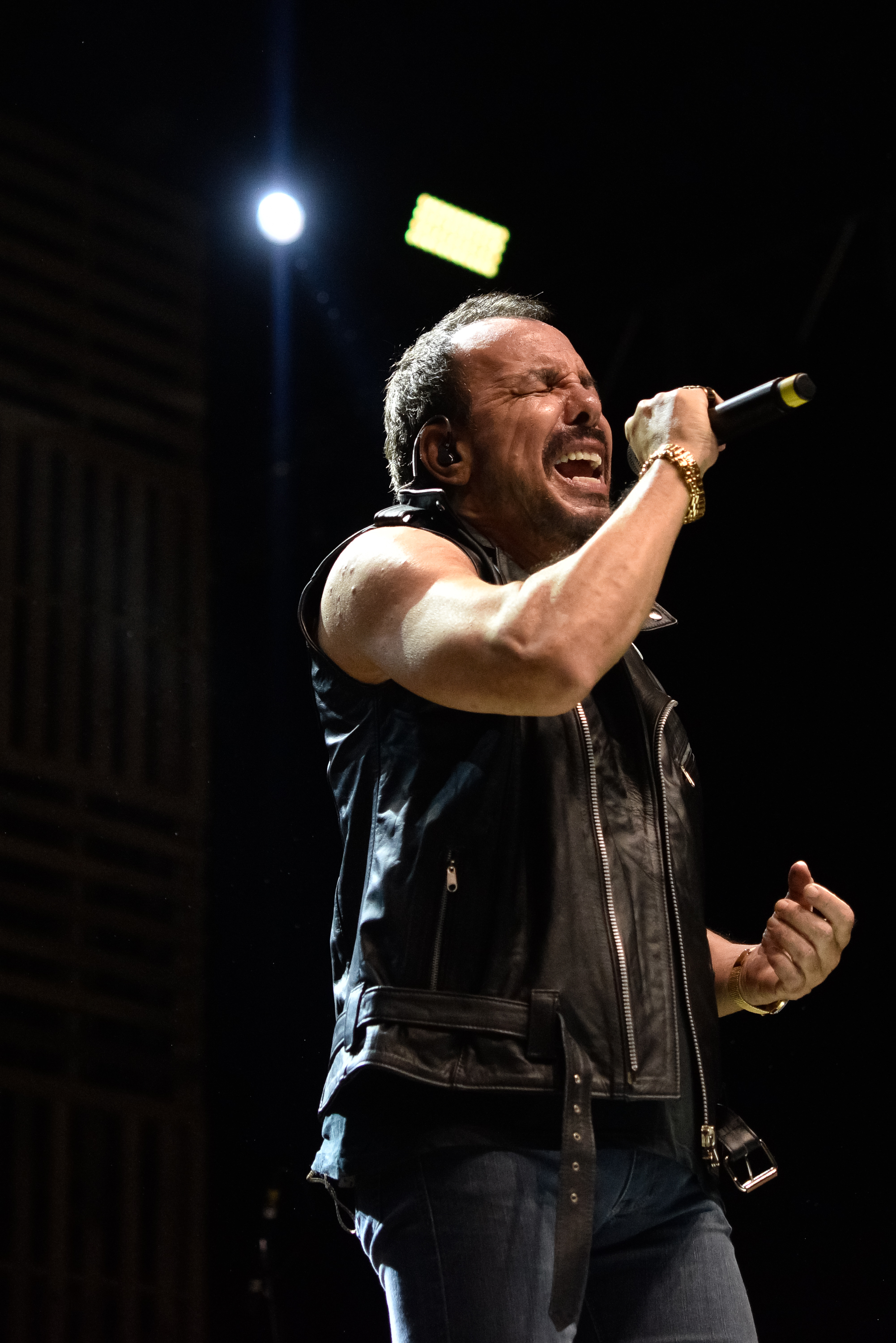
- Ralf in São Paulo, 2023

Background information
- Born: Ralf Richardson da Silva; June 15, 1961 (age 64); Goiânia, Goiás, Brazil
- Genres: Sertanejo music
- Occupation: Singer
- Instrument: Vocals
- Formerly of: Chrystian & Ralf

Ralf Richardson da Silva (born 15 June 1961), known professionally as Ralf, is a Brazilian singer, one of the best "first voices" of the sertanejo music Brazilian duos. With his brother Chrystian singing the "second voice" in the vocal harmony, they formed the well-known Brazilian duo Chrystian & Ralf. Ralf also pursues a solo career.

== Career ==
Chrystian and Ralf formed their famous duo in 1983, selling more than 15 million copies of their albums before separating in 2021, after which each of them pursued solo careers.

In June 2024 Ralf announced a U.S. tour June 28–30, 2024, with performances scheduled in Philadelphia, Danbury and Framingham, to revisit the duo's songs for Brazilian fans.
