= Regininha Poltergeist =

Brazilian model, performance artist and actress

Regininha Poltergeist is the stage name of Regina de Oliveira Soares (born January 6, 1971 Rio de Janeiro), a Brazilian model, performance artist and actress, including a limited career in the 2000s in pornographic films.

== Biography ==
The artistic trajectory of Regininha began in childhood, to 6 years old when she began studying ballet classic. In 1987, she embarked on the career model advertising, using the name Regina Soares. Three years later, graduated from the State School of Dance Maria Olinewa, the Teatro Municipal of Rio de Janeiro.

Regininha shot to fame in 1990 in the show Santa Clara Poltergeist, the role of a saint with the power to heal people through sex. Performative spectacle, designed and produced by singer Fausto Fawcett, she took her stage name (Regininha Poltergeist). Later Regininha participated in the show Básico Instinto (Basic Instinct), presented between 1991 and 1993, also under the command of Fausto Fawcett.

The sexy image and reputation have earned her several invitations to pose naked. Since 1992, Regininha made the cover of several men's magazines such as Playboy and Sexy.

On television, in addition to the humorous TV Globo variety show Zorra Total, Regininha Poltergeist was invited to star in programs of the series Confissões de Adolescente (Teen Confessions) and Como ser solteiro (How to be single). In 1998, after a time away from TV, she was the poster girl for the drink "Cynar" and the following year came to present the erotic program Puro Êxtase (Pure Bliss) on the former partnership CNT / Gazeta.

In 1994 she made a cameo in the movie Veja Esta Canção (See This Song) by Carlos Diegues. In 1997, she played the girlfriend of Peter Carter in Drão, also directed by Carlos Diegues, and theater performed the play Deu a louca no motel (Epic at the motel) in 1998.

== Pornographic career ==
After several years out of the media, the model accepted an invitation from producer Brasileirinhas to star in movies of explicit sex. The first film, initially, would be directed by Fausto Fawcett, but the negotiations have not advanced. The production Perigosa (Dangerous) was released in June 2007.

The second production, Sex City, was released in August 2008.

And the third film, Regininha Sem Censura (Regininha Uncensored), was released in early 2009.In those movies, she acted with some actors, like Carlos Bazuca, Pitt Garcia, Big Macky and Francisco "Bereta" Lopes

== Conversion to Protestantism ==
According to information disclosed by columnist Ancelmo Gois, the newspaper O Globo, Regininha Poltergeist became evangelical and decided to change her life.

== Covers of magazines ==
- Trip
- Playboy
- Sexy
- Sexway
- Casseta e Planeta

== Filmography ==
- Veja Esta Canção (See This Song) (1994)
- Drão (1997)
- Perigosa (Dangerous) (2007)
- Sex City (2008)
- Regininha Sem Censura (Regininha Uncensored) (2009)
