= Human Rights Foundation =

Human rights non-government organisation

- Founded: 2005; 21 years ago
- Founder: Thor Halvorssen Mendoza
- Location(s): Empire State Building; New York City
- Region served: Global
- Chairman: Yulia Navalnaya
- President: Céline Assaf-Boustani
- Employees: 200+
- Website: hrf.org

The Human Rights Foundation (HRF) is a non-profit organization that focuses on promoting and protecting human rights globally, with an emphasis on authoritarian regimes. HRF organizes the Oslo Freedom Forum. The Human Rights Foundation was founded in 2005 by Thor Halvorssen Mendoza, a Venezuelan film producer and human rights advocate. The current chairman is Russian opposition activist Yulia Navalnaya, and Javier El-Hage is the current chief legal officer. The foundation's head office is in the Empire State Building in New York City.

== History ==
The Human Rights Foundation was founded in 2005 by Venezuelan human rights advocate and film producer Thor Halvorssen Mendoza in response to the alarming rise of authoritarianism in Latin America, particularly in Venezuela.

His family's deeply personal experience with political repression—his father was arbitrarily imprisoned and his mother seriously wounded by security forces during a protest—shaped HRF's early mission to boldly defend individual rights in closed societies. HRF's founding council included figures such as Nobel Laureate Elie Wiesel and former Czech president Václav Havel, who called the organization "an essential voice for freedom" and later chaired its International Council until his death in 2011.

Initially focused on Latin America, HRF worked on legal advocacy, international litigation, and public campaigns on behalf of political prisoners. It later expanded its focus to the global stage, taking on cases in countries such as North Korea, Russia, and Saudi Arabia. Today, HRF runs campaigns and engages in pro-democracy advocacy around the world, with a focus on countries classified as authoritarian or hybrid authoritarian.

In 2009, HRF launched the Oslo Freedom Forum, an annual conference that brings together human rights activists, former political prisoners, journalists, and technologists. The event has since become HRF's flagship initiative, expanding with special editions hosted in cities beyond Oslo, including New York, Taipei, and Mexico City. The forum also presents the Václav Havel Prize for Creative Dissent, awarded to individuals using art to challenge authoritarianism through nonviolent means, as well as the Maseko Prize for lawyers who work for justice under such regimes.

Over the years HRF has developed campaigns to promote free speech, creative resistance, and information access in closed societies, as well as push global actors—individuals, corporations, and institutions alike—to cut ties with authoritarian regimes.

Garry Kasparov served as chairman from 2012 to 2024. In 2024, Russian opposition figure and global symbol of resilience Yulia Navalnaya was appointed chair, following the death of her husband, Alexei Navalny, in Russian custody. Her appointment was widely seen as a powerful message to the Kremlin and a reaffirmation of HRF's mission.

In August 2026, the foundation was declared an undesirable organization in Russia.

== Programs and events ==
=== Oslo Freedom Forum ===
The Oslo Freedom Forum is an annual HRF conference in Oslo, Norway, supported by several grant-giving institutions in Scandinavia and the United States through HRF. Donors include Fritt Ord, the City of Oslo, the Thiel Foundation, the Norwegian Helsinki Committee, the Royal Norwegian Ministry of Foreign Affairs, Amnesty International Norway, Plan Norway, the Brin Wojcicki Foundation, Human Rights House Foundation, and Ny Tid.

OFF is structured around sessions that focus on civil resistance, digital security, anti-corruption strategies, and storytelling in closed societies, often featuring firsthand accounts from those on the front lines. The forum also hosts the Václav Havel Prize for Creative Dissent, named after the former Czech president and HRF board member, and the Thulani Maseko Prize, named after the late Swazi lawyer and pro-democracy advocate Thulani Maseko.

=== Art in Protest ===
Art in Protest is HRF's visual arts initiative that supports dissident artists working in or exiled from authoritarian countries. The program provides exhibition opportunities, residencies, and international platforms for artists whose work challenges repression and promotes freedom of expression.

Art in Protest aims to advance creative dissent through global partnerships, art fairs, and curated exhibits. HRF describes it as "the world's only human rights-centered art program."

=== Celebrities & Dictators ===
Celebrities & Dictators is an awareness campaign launched by HRF that focuses on the relationship between authoritarian regimes and global popular culture. The program documents how regimes use celebrities, athletes, influencers, and major entertainment brands to improve their international image and gain legitimacy.

HRF tracks instances of 'sportswashing' and 'artwashing', where repressive governments host concerts, sporting events, or film productions as a way to divert attention from human rights abuses. The organization also calls on public figures to reconsider participating in such events.

=== Flash Drives for Freedom ===
Flash Drives for Freedom is a campaign launched in 2016 to challenge North Korea's total control over information. HRF collects USB drives from donors, fills them with foreign media—including films, books, Wikipedia articles, and news reports—and coordinates their surreptitious distribution into North Korea via defector networks and balloon launches. HRF promotes it as a low-cost, high-impact weapon, designed to spark curiosity and break the regime's monopoly on reality.

=== Financial Freedom ===
The Financial Freedom program examines how authoritarian governments use economic controls to suppress dissent. These controls may include surveillance of financial activity, targeted asset freezes, inflationary currency policies, and the exclusion of critics, journalists, and civil society organizations from access to banking systems.

The program supports initiatives to increase financial resilience among human rights defenders, including training on the use of decentralized tools such as cryptocurrencies, encrypted digital wallets, and privacy-preserving technologies. It also promotes financial literacy for individuals operating in closed societies.

In 2023, HRF launched the CBDC Tracker, an interactive tool that monitors the development and deployment of central bank digital currencies (CBDCs) worldwide, with particular attention to their implications for privacy and civil liberties in authoritarian contexts.

=== College Freedom Forum ===
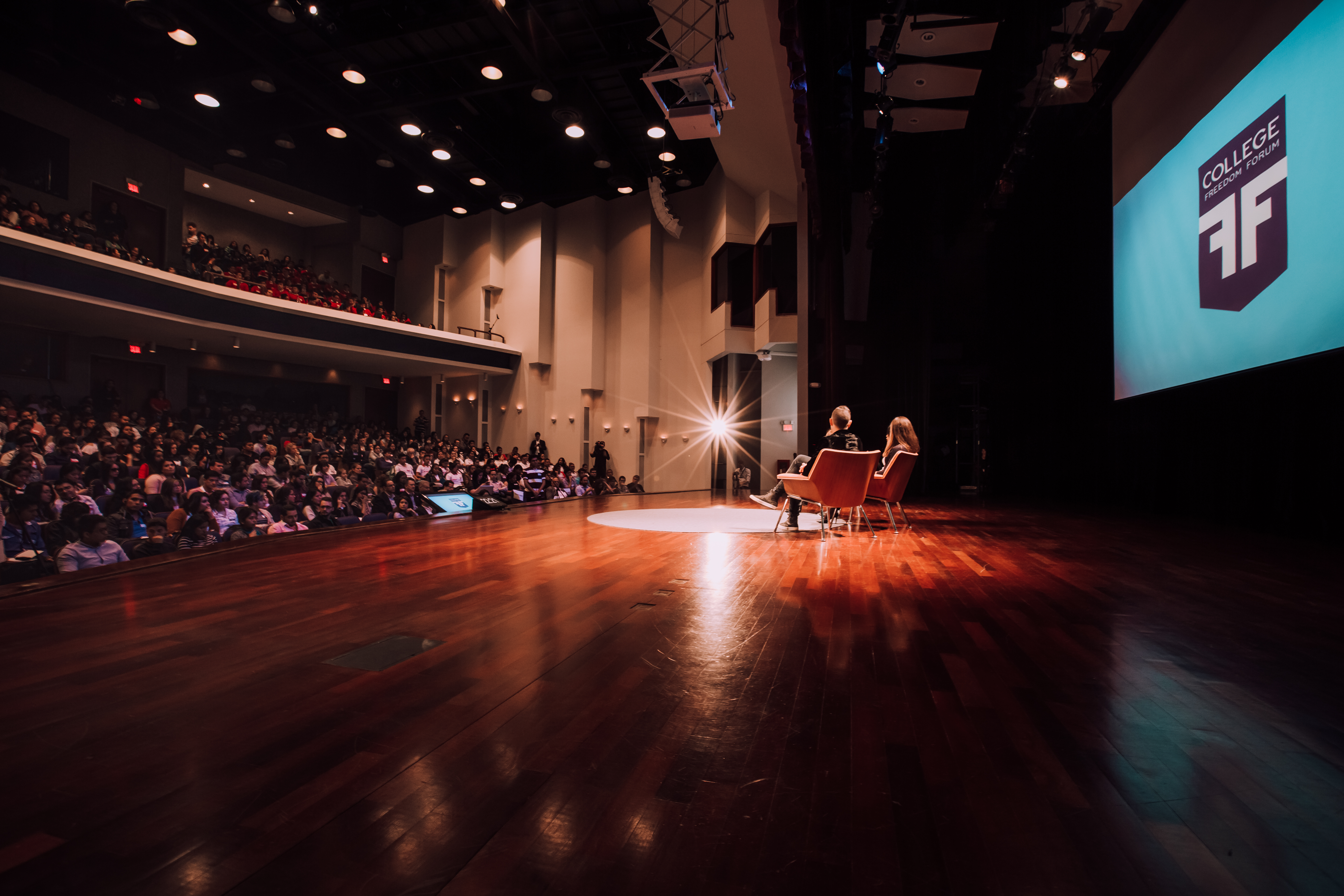
College Freedom Forum 2017 in Universidad Francisco Marroquín, Guatemala City

HRF also organizes yearly OFF satellite events in universities around the world. Called the College Freedom Forum, the event brings similar programming to the main event in Oslo to one-day events on university campuses. In recent years, HRF has brought CFF to several American universities, including Tufts (2013 and 2025), Stanford (2015 and 2024), and George Washington University (2025). CFF has also been held in universities outside North America, including Universidad del Rosario (Colombia) in 2017 and eight times since 2013 at Universidad Francisco Marroquín (Guatemala).

=== CCP Disruption Initiative ===
The CCP Disruption Initiative monitors the policies and global influence operations of the Chinese Communist Party. It raises awareness of human rights violations in Xinjiang, Tibet, and Hong Kong, as well as threats to Taiwan and global surveillance practices.

The program also focuses on digital censorship, the repression of Chinese dissidents at home and abroad, and how international businesses and institutions may be complicit in censorship or data abuse.

=== Combating Kleptocracy ===
Combating Kleptocracy investigates how authoritarian leaders use illicit finance, offshore tax havens, and legal loopholes in democracies to launder wealth, silence critics, and finance repression. The program advocates for reforms such as transparency in corporate ownership and stronger sanctions enforcement.

HRF also publishes reports on how Western professionals—lawyers, real estate brokers, and PR firms—facilitate kleptocratic behavior, and it promotes the adoption of Magnitsky-style targeted sanctions.

=== Digital Champions ===
Digital Champions is a volunteer outreach program involving individuals who amplify HRF's messages and campaigns through digital media. Participants work with HRF's communications team to highlight the organization's advocacy across platforms like X (formerly Twitter), Instagram, and YouTube.

Champions are also encouraged to engage audiences on issues such as political imprisonment, press freedom, and global authoritarianism through original content and digital activism.

=== Dissidents & Dictators ===
Dissidents & Dictators is a biweekly podcast and video series produced by HRF. It features interviews with human rights defenders, legal experts, and activists, often recorded at the Oslo Freedom Forum or in online forums.

Topics covered include censorship, disinformation, political persecution, and international advocacy strategies. The show aims to provide both analysis and firsthand accounts of life under dictatorship.

=== Freedom Fellows ===
The Freedom Fellowship is HRF's leadership development program for human rights defenders working in closed societies. Fellows receive mentorship, participate in capacity-building workshops, and gain international exposure through HRF platforms.

The program is designed for emerging activists in fields such as law, journalism, education, and art, with a focus on sustainability and personal safety in repressive environments.

=== Impact Litigation ===
Impact Litigation refers to HRF's international legal advocacy work. Its legal team prepares petitions to United Nations mechanisms—including the Working Group on Arbitrary Detention—on behalf of political prisoners and persecuted civil society actors.

HRF also files amicus briefs and publishes legal opinions related to freedom of expression, judicial independence, and electoral integrity in authoritarian states. The organization has contributed to rulings in cases in all continents.

=== Micro Grants ===
Micro Grants provide small-scale financial support to activists and organizations in authoritarian countries. The grants are intended to fund short-term projects, such as educational workshops, human rights documentation, or creative activism.

The program operates with minimal bureaucracy to allow for rapid deployment and low-risk support for frontline initiatives. Grant recipients are selected through secure channels and impact is tracked over time.

=== Oslo Scholars ===
Oslo Scholars is the academic mentorship program of the Human Rights Foundation, designed to connect undergraduate students with speakers from the Oslo Freedom Forum. Students are typically selected based on thematic or regional interest and placed in research internships or field work opportunities with human rights advocates.

=== Wear Your Values ===
Wear Your Values is an awareness initiative by the Human Rights Foundation that promotes ethical practices in the global fashion industry. The program highlights labor rights violations in authoritarian countries where garment manufacturing is commonly outsourced and encourages consumers to demand greater transparency in global supply chains. The initiative includes exhibitions, workshops, and public campaigns at HRF events, particularly the Oslo Freedom Forum.

=== Other events ===
==== U.N. Human Rights Council member elections ====
In November 2012 and 2013, HRF co-hosted an event at the United Nations headquarters in New York with the Geneva-based organization UN Watch. The events focused on raising awareness of the election of competitive authoritarian and fully authoritarian regimes to the UN Human Rights Council. HRF brought human rights activists from different countries to testify about the abuses committed by their respective governments.

==== One-day Oslo Freedom Forum Offshoots ====
In October 2012 the Human Rights Foundation hosted the first one day version of the Oslo Freedom Forum, the San Francisco Freedom Forum. The event was supported by Peter Thiel's charitable foundation, Sergey Brin's foundation, and Anne Wojcicki. Nobel Peace Prize laureate Aung San Suu Kyi, on her first trip to the United States since 1971, was presented with a Václav Havel Prize for Creative Dissent. Suu Kyi discussed the motives behind human rights violations and said that they cannot be addressed unless "we know what can be done to prevent" people from dehumanizing one another. The Forum brought attention to a number of human rights issues, and other attendees included Manal al-Sharif, a Saudi woman who challenged her country's ban on women driving by coordinating a "Women2Drive" protest via YouTube, and the spokesman of jailed Russian punk band Pussy Riot. Since then, the event expanded to other cities around the world, including Taipei, Johannesburg, New York, and Mexico City.

==== Sime MIA ====
In November 2014, the Oslo Freedom Forum curated a session at the Sime MIA conference in Miami. The conference featured HRF president Thor Halvorssen, Jordanian cartoonist Suleiman Bakhit, and North Korean refugee Yeonmi Park.

== Awards ==
=== Václav Havel Prize for Creative Dissent ===
The Václav Havel Prize for Creative Dissent was established by the Human Rights Foundation in 2012 to honor individuals who exhibit "extraordinary courage and creativity" in opposing authoritarianism. Named after Czech playwright, dissident, and former president Václav Havel—who served as chair of HRF's International Council until his death in 2011—the award is presented annually at the Oslo Freedom Forum.

The prize recognizes individuals who use nonviolent, often unconventional means to challenge repression and promote liberal democratic values. Past recipients have included Ai Weiwei (China), Zarganar (Burma), Ji Seong-ho (North Korea), members of Pussy Riot (Russia), the Ladies in White (Cuba), Omar Abdulaziz (Saudi Arabia), and Gabriela Montero (Venezuela). Each laureate receives a cash award and is honored for their role in advancing human dignity and freedom through peaceful dissent.

=== Thulani Maseko Prize ===
The Thulani Maseko Prize was launched by HRF in 2024 to honor the memory of Swazi human rights lawyer and democracy advocate Thulani Maseko, who was assassinated in January 2023 for his role in challenging Eswatini's absolute monarchy. The prize recognizes individuals who demonstrate exceptional bravery and commitment to justice in the face of authoritarian violence and judicial repression.

The inaugural recipient was Russian opposition figure Alexei Navalny, posthumously honored for his years-long struggle against corruption and authoritarianism in Russia, and for his unwavering advocacy even while imprisoned. The award was accepted at the 2024 Oslo Freedom Forum by Navalny's widow, Yulia Navalnaya.

== Notable campaigns ==
HRF has led and supported numerous advocacy campaigns on behalf of political prisoners and dissidents worldwide, as well as independent humanitarian initiatives.

Following the 2010 earthquake that took place in Haiti, HRF began a fundraising campaign for a food program devoted to the children of the St Clare's community of Port-au-Prince. The program was started in 2000 by American author Margaret Trost and by Gérard Jean-Juste, a former Amnesty International prisoner of conscience who served as the priest of the St. Clare's community. The campaign aimed at providing 160,000 meals for children.

In 2011, HRF announced its membership in the International Committee to Support Liu Xiaobo. The committee consists of a "coalition composed of six Nobel Peace Prize winners and 15 non-governmental organizations," formed to defend, and advocate for the release of the 2010 Nobel Peace Prize Laureate Liu Xiaobo and his wife Liu Xia, both detained in China. In August 2012, HRF called for former US President Bill Clinton, who according to tax documents is the "honorary chairman" of the Leon H Sullivan Foundation, to revoke the foundation's decision to allow Teodoro Obiang to host their Sullivan Summit. Of Clinton, Halvorssen said "Mr Clinton's wife is US Secretary of State...It seems perplexing that he would allow himself to be so closely associated with a vile dictator." In September 2012, HRF founder Thor Halvorssen wrote an open letter to Ted Marlow, CEO of Urban Outfitters, urging him to reconsider Urban Outfitters' sale of Che Guevara emblazoned merchandise "for the sake of the thousands who perished in the Cuban revolution, and for the sake of the 11 million Cubans who still endure a totalitarian system". It was reported that in October 2012 Urban Outfitters removed the merchandise in response to the outrage. In Venezuela, HRF declared opposition leader a prisoner of conscience and repeatedly urged his release during his 2014–2017 imprisonment. The campaign drew international backing: in late 2014 the United Nations Working Group on Arbitrary Detention ruled López's detention illegal and called for his immediate release. In May 2013, HRF awarded the Václav Havel Prize for Creative Dissent to The Ladies in White (Las Damas de Blanco). In 2015, the award was given to Danilo Maldonado, El Sexto, a Cuban graffiti artist and activist who was arrested in December 2014 for trying to stage a performance art piece in the center of Havana.

In 2014, HRF invited the late Swazi human rights lawyer Thulani Maseko to speak at the Oslo Freedom Forum. He was later jailed for "defaming the King's justice system". After a sustained international media campaign, Maseko was eventually freed.

Several HRF campaigns have focused on breaking information barriers in North Korea. In 2014 HRF organized a San Francisco event called 'Hack North Korea,' a two-day hackathon bringing together technologists, activists, and North Korean defectors. In 2015, HRF helped to organize and bankroll a balloon drop of 10,000 copies of an edited version of the movie The Interview over North Korea. Previously, HRF "has financed balloon drops of pamphlets, TV shows, books and movies over a course of several years, though nothing as high-profile and crudely belittling to Kim Jong Un as is The Interview. In 2016, HRF formally launched the Flash Drives for Freedom project, which crowd-sources and smuggles information into North Korea.

HRF also championed the case of Russian anti-corruption activist, demanding accountability after the Putin government poisoned him and later imprisoned him. When Navalny died in custody in 2024, HRF condemned it as a 'slow-motion murder' by the Kremlin, underscoring the regime's responsibility.

In Cuba, HRF campaigned for jailed artist Luis Manuel Otero Alcántara, a leader of the San Isidro Movement. HRF's legal team submitted his case to the UN, and in 2022 the UN Working Group on Arbitrary Detention declared Otero's imprisonment arbitrary and urged Cuba to release him immediately.

During the mass protests against Belarusian president Alexander Lukashenko in 2020, HRF launched a Belarus Solidarity Fund to assist persecuted protesters, journalists, and civil society. The fund raised over $1 million in individual donations to provide bail, legal aid, and relocation support. It also sent letters to fifteen officers of law enforcement agencies of Belarus and officials of the government of the country, in which it called on them to voluntarily resign and warned them of responsibility for the crimes against humanity.

HRF has also been outspoken against sportswashing. Ahead of the 2022 Beijing Winter Olympics, HRF urged democratic governments to stage a diplomatic boycott. It co-sponsored an 'Empty Box' campaign calling on world leaders to leave VIP seats empty.

In 2019, HRF sent an open letter to rapper Nicki Minaj urging her to cancel a planned concert in Saudi Arabia, citing the kingdom's human rights abuses. The letter received global media attention, and Minaj ultimately canceled the performance.

In September 2023, the Human Rights Foundation (HRF) conducted a visual protest during London Fashion Week by projecting images onto prominent landmarks, including Tower Bridge and the Tate Modern Museum. These projections highlighted the human rights abuses associated with the fashion industry's supply chains, particularly focusing on the exploitation of Uyghur forced labor in China's Xinjiang region. The campaign featured messages such as "What you save costs them everything," aiming to raise consumer awareness about the ethical implications of their clothing choices. This initiative was part of HRF's broader effort to advocate for transparency and accountability within the global fashion industry.

HRF has also coordinated emergency solidarity funds in response to major authoritarian crackdowns in Venezuela and Ukraine. Following the in Venezuela—widely seen as fraudulent after the regime declared Nicolás Maduro the winner despite opposition candidate Edmundo González Urrutia securing a majority—HRF launched the . The initiative provides direct financial assistance to election-day volunteers, civil society leaders, and nonviolent dissidents facing persecution. Similarly, in 2022, after Russia's full-scale invasion of Ukraine, HRF created the Ukraine Solidarity Fund to support frontline organizations, including independent media outlets and local human rights groups. Both funds are part of HRF's broader effort to strengthen democratic resilience and assist those resisting authoritarian regimes in real time.

== Leadership and organization ==
HRF's website states that it adheres to the definition of human rights as put forth in the International Covenant on Civil and Political Rights (1976), believing that all individuals are entitled to the right to speak freely, the right to worship in the manner of their choice, the right to freely associate with those of like mind, the right to acquire and dispose of property, the right to leave and enter their country, the right to equal treatment and due process under law, the right to be able to participate in the government of their country, freedom from arbitrary detainment or exile, freedom from slavery and torture, and freedom from interference and coercion in matters of conscience.

On 1 July 2024, Navalnaya was announced as the chairperson of Human Rights Foundation, succeeding Garry Kasparov.

HRF is registered as a 501(c)(3) nonprofit in the United States and is headquartered in New York City. It is governed by a board of directors and publishes annual reports and financial statements on its website. The foundation had net assets of approximately US$34 million in 2022.

== Public perception ==
The Human Rights Foundation has received attention for its work on behalf of political prisoners and dissidents. In a 2010 article, The New York Times described HRF as having "helped smuggle activists out of repressive countries, provided many with broader exposure and connected others with prominent financiers and technologists." In 2016, Zimbabwean pastor and political activist Evan Mawarire credited the organization with assisting in his release from detention. Similarly, Ecuadorian politician Guadalupe Llori, released after an international campaign in 2007, has cited HRF's support as a contributing factor. Thor Halvorssen, HRF's founder and CEO, participated in a National Review symposium on the death of Chilean dictator Augusto Pinochet, where he was noted as the only one of six contributors to condemn Pinochet's legacy. In 2010, after HRF criticized the Bolivian government and specifically government minister Sacha Sergio Llorenti Soliz for alleged human rights violations in a public letter, the minister referred to HRF as "right wing". In the same month, eighteen Latin America scholars signed an opinion piece in the Norwegian newspaper Aftenposten criticizing the Oslo Freedom Forum for focusing criticism only on Venezuela, Bolivia, and Ecuador, three countries with leftist governments. The scholars praised the group for putting "the spotlight on key global issues", but also stated that Cuban human rights activist and HRF then-chairman Armando Valladares had defended the 2009 Honduran coup d'état while speaking at the forum. Valladares resigned on July 2, 2009, due to HRF's position on the Honduran coup. Since that time, however, HRF has expanded its programming to focus on authoritarian regimes across multiple regions and political ideologies.

Former Czech president Václav Havel served as chair of HRF's international council until his death in 2011. Russian opposition figures Garry Kasparov and Yulia Navalnaya have both held senior roles in the foundation's leadership. Upon her appointment in 2024, Navalnaya expressed support for HRF's work in her public statement.

In 2011, the Honduran Truth and Reconciliation Commission cited HRF's legal report on the 2009 Honduran constitutional crisis in its official findings. HRF's advocacy campaigns and international forums have also received coverage in media outlets, which have noted the organization's efforts to connect dissidents with global platforms.

HRF's leadership has also attracted high-profile endorsements: former Czech president Václav Havel served as chair of its international council, and Russian opposition figures like chess champion Garry Kasparov and Yulia Navalnaya have headed the foundation. Upon becoming HRF chair in 2024, Navalnaya stated she was "honored to serve" and that "HRF's mission is close to my heart," reflecting the esteem with which the organization is held by many pro-democracy activists.

== Media and publications ==
The Human Rights Foundation actively produces and disseminates media content to raise awareness about authoritarianism and support human rights advocacy.

=== Films and documentaries ===
HRF has been involved in the production and support of several documentary films addressing human rights issues and authoritarian regimes.

Sugar Babies (2007) is a documentary produced in association with HRF about the exploitation of Haitian migrant workers in the Dominican Republic's sugar industry. It focuses on issues of forced labor and statelessness.

The Dissident (2020), directed by Bryan Fogel, examines the assassination of Saudi journalist Jamal Khashoggi and the political context surrounding the case. The film premiered at the Sundance Film Festival and was later released on video-on-demand platforms.

Icarus: The Aftermath (2022) is a follow-up to the 2017 documentary Icarus, continuing the story of Russian whistleblower Grigory Rodchenkov. The film explores the consequences of exposing Russia's state-run doping program.

Beyond Utopia (2023), directed by Madeleine Gavin, follows the escape of North Korean defectors through underground networks. HRF supported the film as part of its work on North Korea.

=== Reports and white papers ===
HRF publishes research reports and white papers that examine systemic human rights abuses in authoritarian regimes. These publications aim to inform international audiences, policymakers, and advocacy efforts.

- The Facts and the Law Behind the Democratic Crisis of Honduras, 2009–2010 (2010): A legal analysis authored by Javier El-Hage examining the constitutional and legal issues surrounding the 2009 coup d'état that ousted President Manuel Zelaya. The report was cited by the Honduran Truth and Reconciliation Commission in its 2011 findings.
- The Cost and Consequences of the War on Drugs (2019): HRF's inaugural drug policy report investigating the human rights implications of global drug prohibition.
- CCP: 100 Years of Suppression (2021): A report documenting the Chinese Communist Party's history of human rights abuses and growing global influence.
- Framing Justice in Syria (2021): Produced in collaboration with The Syria Campaign, this report explores avenues for international justice through universal jurisdiction for crimes committed by the Assad regime.
- Human Trafficking in Cuba's Medical Missions (2022): A study of forced labor in Cuba's international medical export programs.
- Authoritarianism and Human Trafficking (2023): This report examines the relationship between authoritarian governance and global trafficking networks.
- Infiltrating America: How the United Arab Emirates Launched an Unprecedented Political Interference Campaign in the United States (2024): A report uncovering the UAE's covert operations in U.S. politics, part of HRF's Combating Kleptocracy program.

HRF also contributes to the United Nations Human Rights Council's Universal Periodic Review (UPR) process, documenting human rights conditions in authoritarian countries.

=== Podcasts ===
HRF produces a podcast titled Dissidents & Dictators, which features interviews with human rights defenders, policymakers, artists, and technologists confronting authoritarian rule. Episodes are recorded at HRF's offices, the Oslo Freedom Forum, and through virtual platforms.

=== Editorial contributions ===
HRF staff and affiliated experts regularly publish op-eds and commentary in international outlets. These editorials cover political repression, digital surveillance, corruption, and legal trends in authoritarian states, and aim to influence both policy debate and public understanding. Recent examples include pieces on Bolivia, Russia, the United Arab Emirates, and Iran.
