= Gretchen (singer) =

Brazilian singer and media personality

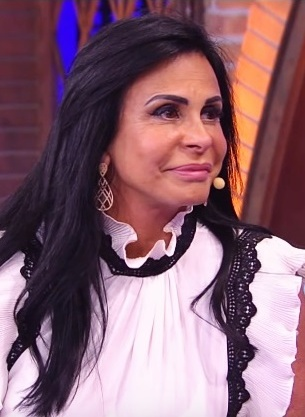
- Gretchen in 2017
- Born: Maria Odete Brito de Miranda; 29 May 1959 (age 67); Rio de Janeiro, Brazil
- Occupations: Singer; dancer; media personality; actress
- Years active: 1978–present
- Political party: MDB (since 2022)
- Spouses: Chrystian (m. 1981; div. 1981) Silva Neto (m. 1981; div. 1983) Décio Nascimento (m. 1984; div. 1984) Paulo Sérgio Aversani (m. 1984; div. 1988) Aguinaldo Cruz Rosa (m. 1994; div. 1996) César Zago (m. 1996; div. 1997) Afonso Costa Júnior (m. 1998; div. 2001) Giuliano Cezimbra (m. 2002; div. 2003) Toni Abia (m. 2004; div. 2005) Guto Guitar (m. 2006; div. 2007) Demis Miranda (m. 2007; div. 2010) Sílvio Alves (m. 2010; div. 2011) Alexandry Mangueira (m. 2011; div. 2011) Túlio Sotto Mayor (m. 2011; div. 2012) Carlos Marques (m. 2013; div. 2020) Esdras de Souza (m. 2020)
- Children: 7 (including Thammy)
- Relatives: Sula Miranda (sister)
- Musical career
- Genres: Disco; Latin pop; mambo
- Instrument: Vocals

Maria Odete Brito de Miranda de Souza (born 29 May 1959), known professionally as Gretchen, is a Brazilian singer and media personality. Gretchen is the older sister of Brazilian country singer Sula Miranda, and mother of Brazilian politician Thammy Miranda. She is known for reinventing her music and image, and for keeping her autonomy within the music industry. She has a vast musical repertory, and has been the source of some controversy throughout her career. Referred to as the "Rainha do Bumbum" ("Hips Queen"), Gretchen has sold 15 million records over nearly four decades.

Her professional name was inspired by the Brazilian movie Aleluia, Gretchen, which tells the story of a German Brazilian immigrant family.

== Career ==
After doing backing vocals for years, Gretchen appeared on a TV show in 1978 and soon recorded her debut single, "Dance With Me", disco song inspired in Charo's "Dance a Little Bit Closer". In 1980, 1981 and 1982, she released her three most successful albums: My Name Is Gretchen, You and Me, and Lonely. These three albums featured songs that became hallmarks in her career, such as "Freak Le Boom Boom", "Melô do Piripipi", "Conga Conga Conga". She sold more than 15 million records worldwide. Between 1980 and 1982, she grabbed the media's attention by making "sexy" music, while still enjoying popularity among children. After Lonely in 1982, she went on a downward spiral while trying to remain on the charts. Born as a Roman Catholic, Gretchen embraced the Protestant faith in the 1990s, and began singing gospel music.

By the end of the 1990s, her hits had returned to the dance floors. With the emergence of Butt Music stars like Carla Perez, Gretchen was eventually recognized as a forerunner of the hip shakers. The compilation 20 Super Sucessos came out in 1998 on Copacabana/EMI.

Gretchen signed a contract to star in a porn movie for Brazilian porn producers Brasileirinhas in 2006, following the example of Rita Cadillac, with whom she appeared in the 1982 pornochanchada Aluga-se Moças. The movie, La Conga Sex, was released by November, followed by another porn title, Carnaval 2007, released in February 2007.

In 2008, she became candidate of Cidadania to be mayor of the city of Itamaracá.

On July 3, 2017, she was featured on Katy Perry's "Swish Swish" lyric video. She also appeared with Rita Cadillac in a Netflix Brasil commercial to promote the series GLOW.

== Legacy and impact ==
Gretchen has become a pop culture and internet icon during the 2010s. American recording artist Katy Perry claimed that "She is the internet!" Alvaro Neder of AllMusic wrote about her rise to stardom and the impact of her dancing style:

Relying in her dizzying curves and hot dancing style, the Carioca vocalist Gretchen was launched in the late 70's by Mister Sam, soon performing around Brazil with the group Záccaro. After her TV debut at the Sílvio Santos show, she was invited to record "Dance With Me", but big hits ("Freak Le Boom Boom", "Melô do Piripiri", "Conga Conga Conga" "I Love You/Je T'Aime") came only between 1980-2 with My Name Is Gretchen, You and Me and Lonely. In that period, she became a popularity phenomenon, having been one of the most successful Brazilian artists, performing shows by the thousands and appearing regularly in the most famous TV programmes [...] With the decline of her vogue in the 80's, despite her efforts in the exploration of new fashionable rhythms like the lambada, she converted to Protestantism and became a gospel singer. In the 90's her hits became cults in the Brazilian elegant dance floors, and, with the success of similarly shaped and styled singers/dancers like Carla Perez and others revealed by É o Tchan and its epigones, Gretchen was finally acknowledged as the pioneer of a style.

== Personal life ==
Gretchen has seven children, five biological and two adoptive, including Thammy Miranda; she is also the sister of Yara and Sula Miranda, who are also in the music business.

During her career, Gretchen had many boyfriends, who often appeared in the media as her husbands, totaling 17 alleged husbands, when in fact there were five. In 2015 the singer was living in Monaco, where she opened a clothing store. Gretchen resided in a duplex with her husband.

Gretchen was portrayed by Emanuelle Araújo in the 2017 biographical film Bingo: The King of the Mornings.

== Discography ==
=== Albums ===
Year	Album	Record company	Sales	Certifications
1979	My Name is Gretchen	Building/Copacabana	World: 8,000,000; BRA: 5,000,000; ARG: 2,000,000	Platinum
1981	You and Me	Building/Copacabana	BRA: 2,000,000	Platinum
1982	Lonely	Building/Copacabana	BRA: 2,000,000	Platinum
1983	Gretchen	Building/Copacabana	BRA: 1,000,000	Platinum
1987	Latino Americana	Copacabana	BRA: 500,000	Platinum
1988	Gypsy	3M	BRA: 500,000	Platinum
1991	Cheiro & Chamego	Musicolor	BRA: 200,000	Gold
1993	Vem Me Ver	Line Records	BRA: 150,000	Gold
1995	Sexy Charme Dance	RGE	BRA: 100,000	Gold
1996	Jesus Dance	Koinonia	BRA: 30,000	—
1997	A Nova Gretchen	Koinonia	BRA: 10,000	—
2000	La Pasión	Zen Records	BRA: 10,000	—
2001	Me Deixa Louca	Polymusic/Sony Music	BRA: 25,000	—
2009	De Conga a Coração: Gretchen canta Dorgival Dantas	Nova Produções/Independente	BRA: 5,000	—

=== Singles ===
Year	Album	Record company	Sales in Brazil	Certifications
1979	Dance with Me	Building/Copacabana	500,000	Platinum
1979	Fera	Building/Copacabana	100,000	Gold
1979	Freak Le Boom Boom	Building/Copacabana	1,000,000	Platinum
1980	1-2-3 (One-Two-Three)	Building/Copacabana	50,000	—
1981	Conga Conga Conga	Building/Copacabana	1,500,000	Platinum
1981	Give Me Love	Building/Copacabana	100,000	Gold
1981	My Name Is Gretchen/Quiero ser libre	Building/Copacabana	200,000	Gold
1982	Melô do Piripipi	Building/Copacabana	1,500,000	Platinum

=== Promo albums ===
- 1998 – Louca Tentação
- 2004 – Relaxa Baby (Me Queira Want)
- 2006 – Linda E Toda Sua
- 2008 – Tuta Kisses
- 2010 – Forró: Maracutaia – Xana Rana

=== Compilations ===
- 1982 – Gretchen e Os Três Patinhos, e o Yure Vale (EP)
- 1982 – Quiero Ser Libre/My Name Is Gretchen
- 1998 – 20 Super Sucessos
- 2002 – 25 Anos De Sucesso
- 2007 – Mito Dourado
- 2010 – Coletânea Gretchen Prata-Cor: Êxitos De Uma Rainha
- 2011 – Charme, Talento e Gostosura
- 2017 - "The Queen"

=== Singles ===
- 2018 – "Bumbum Gourmet"
- 2018 – "Chacoalha"
- 2017 – "Falsa Fada"
- 2016 – "Usurpadora"
- 2015 – "Te Quiero Besar"
- 2015 – "Lento"
- 2015 – "Rainha do Bumbum"
- 2012 – "So Let Your Body Rock"
- 2012 – "Plastic Lover"
- 2011 – "I'm Cool"
- 2011 – "The Lazy Song"
- 2010 – "Fio Dental"
- 2010 – "Sonho Acordado"
- 2010 – "Pintura Íntima"
- 2010 – "Mordida De Amor (Love Bites)"
- 2010 – "Bola Que Embola"
- 2010 – "Maracutaia (I'm Yours)"
- 2009 – "Eu Digo Stop!"
- 2009 – "Final De Semana"
- 2009 – "Quero Te Amar"
- 2009 – "Você Não Vale Nada"
- 2009 – "Mexe, Remexe"
- 2009 – "Eu Só Quero Te Amar"
- 2009 – "Por Que? (Eu Acho Que Estou Gostando De Você)"
- 2009 – "Primeiro Passo"
- 2008 – "Tutaminando"
- 2008 – "Kisses Baby Hula-la"
- 2008 – "Marinheira Pachará"
- 2008 – "O Mito"
- 2008 – "Piranga"
- 2008 – "Vó Gina"
- 2008 – "Tutatinamonga"
- 2007 – "Mito Dourado"
- 2007 – "Eu Quero É Você"
- 2007 – "Muxada"
- 2007 – "Põe Ae"
- 2007 – "Disco Show"
- 2007 – "Mito Mitado"
- 2006 – "Sereia A-Bê-Mar"
- 2006 – "Linda E Toda Sua"
- 2006 – "Pra Você"
- 2006 – "Sonhando Acordada"
- 2006 – "Tá Afim De Hã (Mas Comigo Hã, Hã)"
- 2004 – "Salgadinha"
- 2004 – "Muribeca Assada"
- 2004 – "Querendo Te Quiero Want (Those Days)"
- 2004 – "Lábios"
- 2004 – "Relaxa (Don't Stop The Game)"
- 2002 – "É Pra Dançar"
- 2002 – "Que Saudade"
- 2001 – "Tá Bom Demais"
- 2001 – "Requebra"
- 2001 – "Vamos Fazer Tchi, Tchi"
- 2001 – "Me Deixa Louca"
- 2000 – "Voulez Vous, Voulez Vous"
- 2000 – "Love to Love Baby"
- 2000 – "Ok! DJ"
- 2000 – "Dança do Umbigo"
- 2000 – "Baby, Baby"
- 2000 – "Mambo Venga"
- 2000 – "Mira Que Mina Manera"
- 2000 – "Could It Be Magic"
- 2000 – "Cunhé, Cunhé"
- 2000 – "La Pasión"
- 1999 – "Amor Canibal"
- 1999 – "Peri Selvagem"
- 1999 – "Me Tira Daqui"
- 1999 – "Tentação Animal"
- 1999 – "Louca E Selvagem"
- 1999 – "Louca Tentação"
- 1998 – "Anjos De Deus"
- 1998 – "Meu Prazer"
- 1997 – "Jesus Pode Entrar"
- 1997 – "Dom De Deus"
- 1997 – "Livre E Feliz"
- 1996 – "Maravilhoso"
- 1996 – "Reino De Deus"
- 1996 – "Tribo De Judá"
- 1996 – "Amo Jesus"
- 1996 – "Com Alegria e Adoração"
- 1996 – "Não Há Barreiras"
- 1996 – "Jeová Jire"
- 1996 – "Jesus É Rei"
- 1995 – "Oh Carol!"
- 1995 – "Não Vou Deixar de Amar (I Can't Stop Loving You)"
- 1995 – "Coisas Do Meu Coração (For All We Know)"
- 1995 – "Feelings"
- 1995 – "The Summer Is Magic"
- 1995 – "Baby Não Dá (Lady Don't Cry)"
- 1995 – "Tempos de Prazer (Sweet Dreams)"
- 1994 – "Arte Final"
- 1994 – "La Salsa"
- 1994 – "Sha, Na, Na"
- 1993 – "Não Há Sede Que Resista"
- 1993 – "Voulez Fouche [Frisson]"
- 1993 – "Vem Me Ver"
- 1993 – "Porompompero"
- 1992 – "Soy La Mujer"
- 1991 – "Luar de Amor"
- 1991 – "Tô Que Tô"
- 1991 – "Siboney (Siboney)"
- 1991 – "Bailarina (The Boxer)"
- 1990 – "Xamegando"
- 1990 – "Cheiro & Chamego"
- 1989 – "Shaking My Body"
- 1989 – "Diamante Mujer"
- 1989 – "Give It Up In Vain"
- 1989 – "Pillow Talk"
- 1988 – "Colombiar"
- 1988 – "Monster Party"
- 1988 – "Those Were The Days"
- 1988 – "Gypsy (Czardas)"
- 1987 – "Comment Ça Va"
- 1987 – "I Was Born To Love You"
- 1987 – "Do You Like Boom Boom?"
- 1987 – "Love is Love"
- 1987 – "Do Bidu Dam Dam"
- 1987 – "Sueño Tropical"
- 1987 – "Je T'aime Moi Non Plus"
- 1987 – "Latino Americana (Soy Fuego)"
- 1985 – "Wild Tiger"
- 1985 – "Body Baby"
- 1985 – "Teach Me A Tiger"
- 1985 – "Le Bal Masque"
- 1985 – "Hula Hula Ba Ba Yê"
- 1983 – "Melô do Xique Xique"
- 1984 – "Bate Bate Coração"
- 1983 – "Veneno"
- 1983 – "Coochie-Coochie"
- 1983 – "Aerobic (Ginástica)"
- 1983 – "Ela Tem Raça, Charme, Talento e Gostosura"
- 1983 – "Chá Chá Chá Boom Boom"
- 1983 – "Baby"
- 1983 – "Give Me Your Love"
- 1983 – "Melô do Pata Pata (Aie So Mama Ie Pata Pata)"
- 1982 – "Allah-la-ô My Love"
- 1982 – "Bumbum No Chão"
- 1982 – "Gretchen E Os Três Patinhos" (EP)
- 1982 – "Disco Show Medley"
- 1982 – "It's All Right"
- 1982 – "Y Te Amare"
- 1982 – "My Man of Love"
- 1982 – "Mambo Mambo Mambo"
- 1982 – "Melô do Piripipi (Je Suis La Femme)"
- 1981 – "Climax In The Space"
- 1981 – "Carmem Miranda"
- 1981 – "Do You Wanna Love?"
- 1981 – "Quiero Ser Libre"
- 1981 – "You And Me"
- 1981 – "Give Me Love"
- 1981 – "Conga Conga Conga"
- 1979 – "Outra Vez Mulher"
- 1979 – "My Name is Gretchen (Sex Star)"
- 1979 – "Lock'n Roller"
- 1979 – "I Love You Je T'aime"
- 1979 – "Boggie Boggie"
- 1979 – "1, 2, 3 (One Two Three)"
- 1979 – "Me Gusta El Cha-Cha-Cha"
- 1979 – "Freak Le Boom Boom"
- 1978 – "Dance With Me"

== Soundtrack ==
- Bar Esperança 1983, track "Conga Conga Conga"
- Elas por Elas 1982, track "Melô do Piripipi"

== Guest appearances ==
- As Melindrosas Disco Baby 1978, Choir, Chorus
- Pirlimpimpim II 1984, track "Milongueira da Sierra Pelada"
- No Mundo da Crianca 1986, track "Bumbum No Chão"
- A Discoteca do Chacrinha 1999, Medley of "Freak Le Boom Boom", "Me Gusta El Cha Cha Cha", "Conga Conga Conga"
- "Swish Swish" (2017) by Katy Perry featuring Nicki Minaj

== Filmography ==
- Vamos Cantar Disco Baby (1979)
- Aluga-se Moças (1982)
- Pirlimpimpim 2 (TV movie) (1984)
- A Rota do Brilho (1990)
- La Conga Sex (Porn) (2006)
- Carnaval 2007 (Porn) (2006)
- Gretchen: A Rainha do Bumbum (Porn) (2008)
- Gretchen Filme Estrada (2010)
- Power Couple (2016)
- A Dona do Pedaço (2019) as Gina
- The Masked Singer Brasil (2022) cosplayed as rose
- Drag Race Brasil (2023) as Guest judge
- O Melhor Amigo (2025)
- Power Couple (2025)
