= Bruna Ferraz =

Brazilian adult model

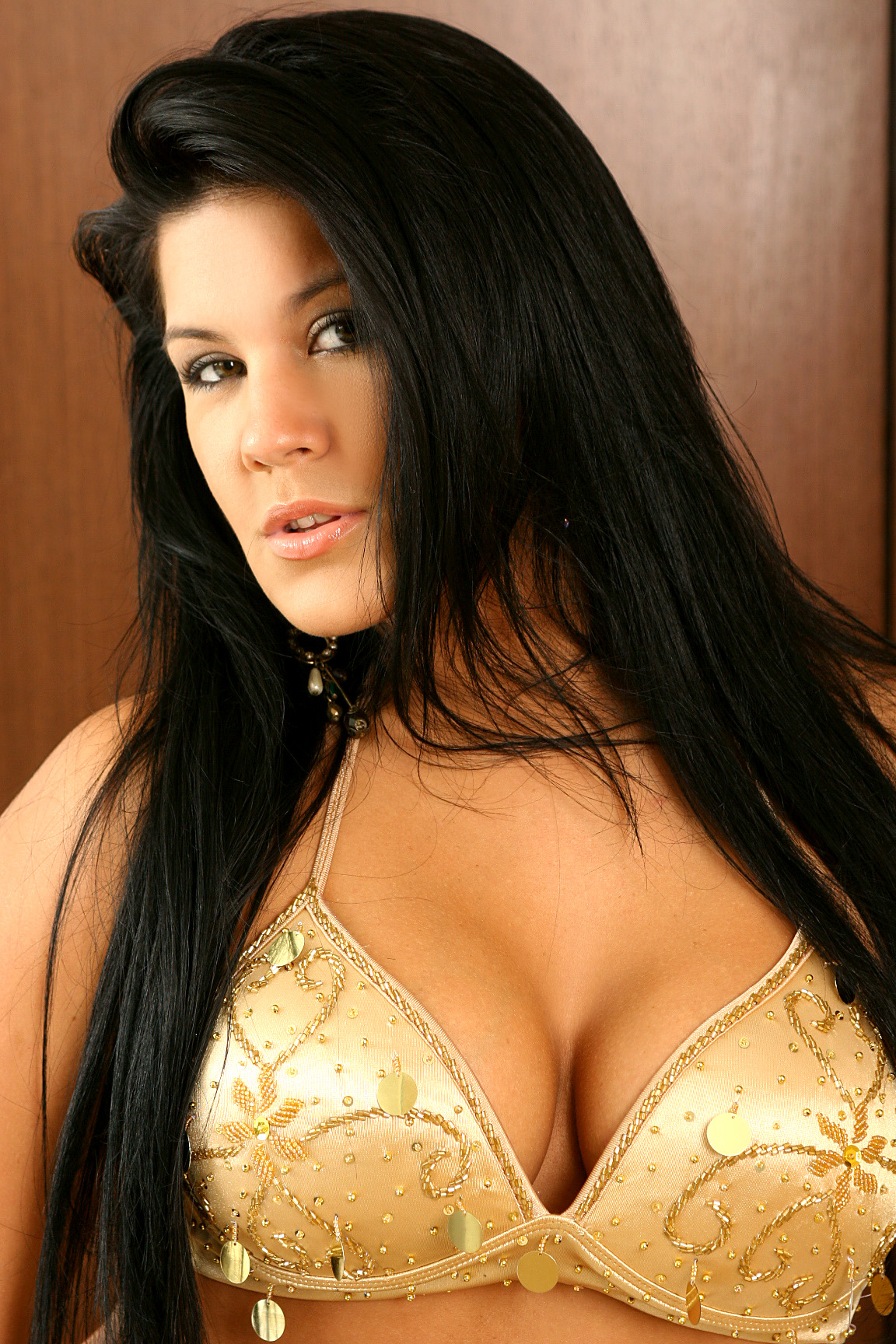
- Bruna Ferraz in 2007.
- Born: 5 September 1981 (age 44); Porto Alegre, Rio Grande do Sul, Brazil
- Occupations: adult actress, model, TV personality

Bruna Ferraz (born 5 September 1981) is a Brazilian adult model, pornographic actress and TV-personality.

== Life and career ==
Born in Porto Alegre, Ferraz moved in São Paulo in 2005, with the goal to build a career as a stripper. She became first known as Internet personality thanks to her webcam sexy-shows. In 2007 she entered the adult industry signing an exclusive contract with the company Brasileirinhas; the same year she starred her first film, A Garota da Web Sex.

In addition to adult videos, Ferraz was also a cast-member of SBT TV-show Sem Controle and of the RedeTV! late night TV-show Eu Vi na TV hosted by João Kléber. She also co-hosted, alongside the actresses Leila Lopes and Pâmela Butt, the talk show Calcinha Justa in the Pay TV Sexprivé Brasileirinhas.

In 2012, Ferraz paraded with the Samba School "Unidos de Vila Maria" in the Carnival of São Paulo.
