= Rita Cadillac (Brazilian entertainer) =

Brazilian dancer and singer (born 1954)

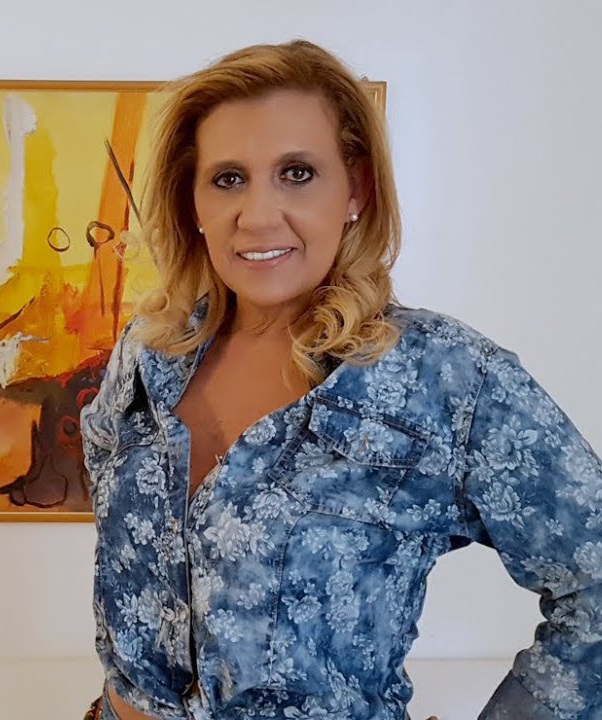
- Born: Rita de Cássia Coutinho; 13 June 1954 (age 72); Rio de Janeiro, Brazil
- Height: 1.67 m (5 ft 6 in)
- Spouse: Luiz Nóbrega (2007 – present)

Rita de Cássia Coutinho, known as Rita Cadillac, (born 13 June 1954) is a Brazilian dancer and singer. She took her stage name from Rita Cadillac, an acclaimed French dancer of the 1950s and 1960s. She is a former chacrete, a special name to identify the dancers who appeared in the TV shows hosted by Chacrinha.

Cadillac was born in Rio de Janeiro. In 1982, she co-starred with Gretchen in the pornochanchada Aluga-se Moças and made a brief cameo appearance as herself in the 2003 film Carandiru.

In 2004, Cadillac (who was then 50 years of age) made a contract with porn producers Brasileirinhas in exchange for 500,000 R$. From 2004 to 2009, she appeared in 11 pornographic films for Brasileirinhas. In 2009, she was influential in launching a new adult model career for the dancer who then started to be promoted under the alias "Cléo Cadillac".

At Brazilian local elections in 2008, she ran as a candidate of Brazilian Socialist Party for Praia Grande city council.

In April 2010, the documentary Rita Cadillac - A Lady do Povo was released in Brazil. The film depicts her life since childhood until 2007 (year of production).

In July 2017, Cadillac appeared with Gretchen in a Netflix Brasil commercial to promote the series GLOW.

== A Fazenda ==
On June 23, 2013, Rita Cadillac was announced as one of sixteen new celebrities of the sixth season of "A Fazenda".

On July 23, 2013, after 31 days, she was eliminated, finishing in 12th place in the competition.
