= Barbosa Ferraz, Paraná =

Coordinates: 24°04′S 52°03′W

- Municipality
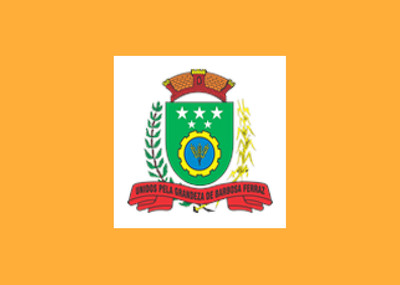
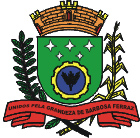
- Flag Coat of arms
- Interactive map of Barbosa Ferraz, Paraná
- Country: Brazil
- Region: Southern
- State: Paraná
- Mesoregion: Centro Ocidental Paranaense

Population (2020)
  - Total: 11,426
- Time zone: UTC−3 (BRT)

Barbosa Ferraz, Paraná is a municipality in the state of Paraná in the Southern Region of Brazil.

== See also ==
- List of municipalities in Paraná
