= Javier El-Hage =

Bolivian lawyer

- Born: Bolivia
- Education: Private University of Santa Cruz de la Sierra (LLB); Complutense University (LLM); Columbia University (LLM)

Carlos Javier El-Hage is an international attorney admitted to practice in the state of New York, United States.

== Background and education ==
Born in Santa Cruz, Bolivia, El-Hage obtained his law degree at Universidad Privada de Santa Cruz de la Sierra. He is also a Fulbright-LASPAU scholar, and holds master's degrees in international law from Columbia University School of Law, and Complutense University of Madrid.

== Career ==
El-Hage has worked as a professor of constitutional law at UPSA, and has lectured on international law issues in the US and other places in Latin America, including at Harvard Law School, the American Enterprise Institute, the Hudson Institute, the Global Centre for the Responsibility to Protect, Brazil's Fundação Armando Alvares Penteado and Argentina's University of CEMA.

El-Hage's opinions in English have appeared in journals in the US and the UK, including in the Americas Quarterly, Forbes magazine, The Wall Street Journal, the National Journal, Wired, and the Washington Post

El-Hage is also the author of the book International Law Limitations for the Constituent Assembly: Democracy, Human Rights, Foreign Investment and Drug Control. The book was presented as part of a package with relevant legal literature to all members of the Bolivian Constituent Assembly (BCA) 2007–2008. As a result, the author was invited by the BCA to provide expert testimony on international investment law and international human rights law.

In 2010, El-Hage authored HRF's report entitled, "The Facts and the Law behind the Democratic Crisis of Honduras 2009-2010", which was extensively quoted by the Honduras Truth and Reconciliation Commission's 2011 report.

In 2011, El-Hage authored HRF's amicus curiae brief that was filed with the Inter-American Court of Human Rights, on the case of Leopoldo López Mendoza v. Bolivarian Republic of Venezuela. In 2011 and 2012, El-Hage participated as a judge at the Inter-American Human Rights Moot Court Competition, organized since 1996 by American University's Washington College of Law.

== Publications ==
- El-Hage, Javier, International Law Limitations for the Constituent Assembly: Democracy, Human Rights, Foreign Investment and Drug Control (3rd Edition), Konrad Adenauer Stiftung [Bolivia].
- El-Hage, Javier (translation and preface), Introducción al Estudio del Derecho. Técnica, Decisión y Dominación, by Tercio Sampaio Ferraz Jr., Marcial Pons [Madrid, Barcelona, Buenos Aires].
- El-Hage, Javier, The Facts and the Law behind the Democratic Crisis of Honduras 2009-2010, HRF Center for Law and Democracy [New York].
- El-Hage, Javier (article), La protection des droits politiques en Amérique latine, in the book "Le glaive et la balance. Droits de l'homme, justice constitutionnelle et démocratie en Amérique latine", by Arnaud Martin, L'Harmattan [Bordeaux, France].
- El-Hage, Javier (article), How may tribunals apply the customary necessity rule to the Argentine cases? An analysis of ICSID decisions with respect to the interaction between article XI of the U.S.-Argentina BIT and the customary rule of necessity, in the book Yearbook on International Investment Law & Policy 2011-2012, Karl P. Sauvant.
- El-Hage, Javier (translation), Economía Básica, Thomas Sowell, Deusto S.A. Ediciones [Madrid].
- El-Hage, Javier (article), Incitement And Defamation In Saudi Arabia: The Case Of Human Rights Lawyer Waleed Abu Al-Khair, Journal of International and Comparative Law: Vol. 24 : Iss. 2, Article 2
