= Sula Miranda =

Brazilian singer (born 1963)

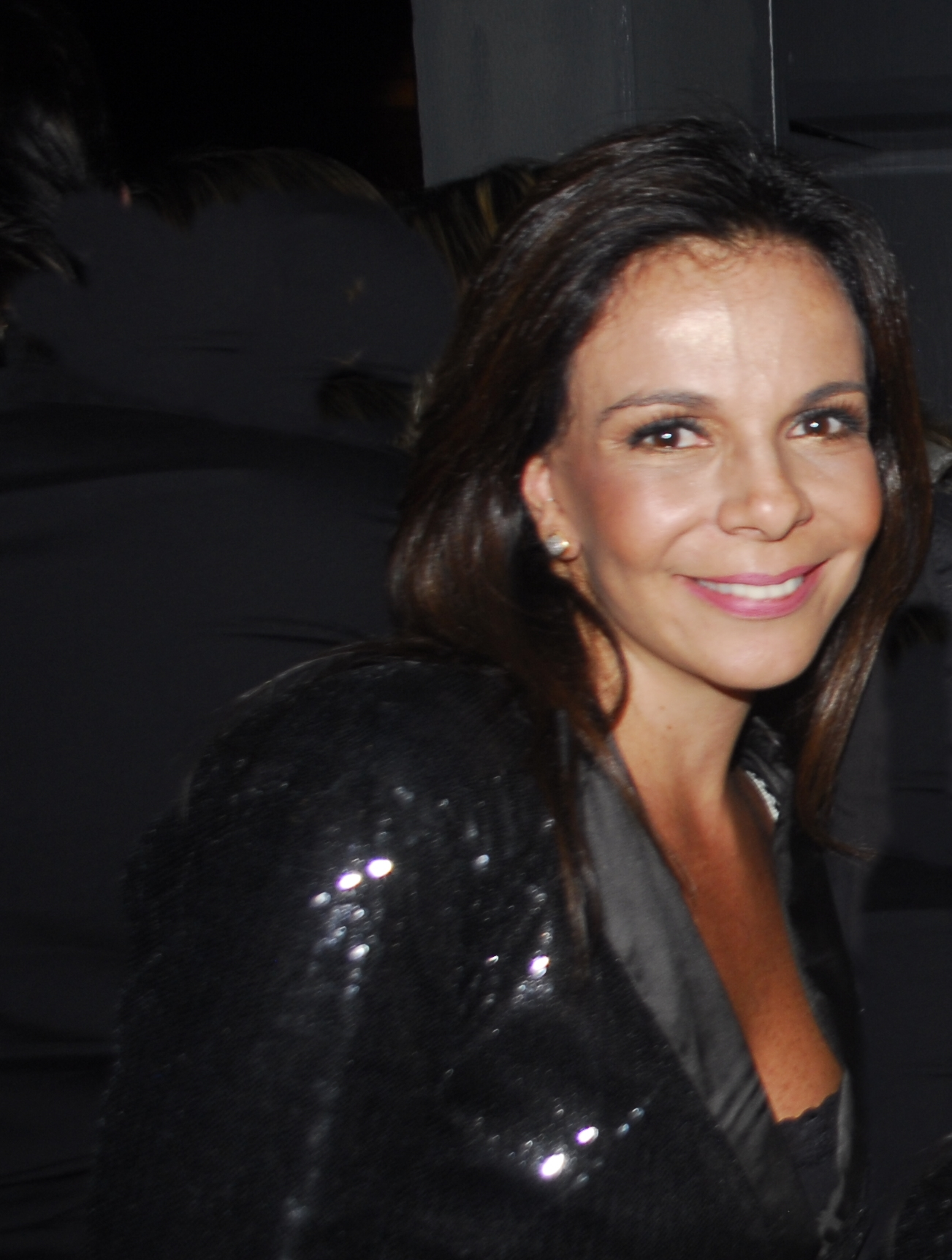
Sula Miranda in 2012

Suely Brito de Miranda, known as Sula Miranda (São Paulo, 12 November 1963), is a Brazilian singer. She reached success from the end of 1980s singing sertanejo music. She is the sister of singer Gretchen.

Miranda began her musical career in the group As Mirandas, along with her sisters Yara and Maria Odete (Gretchen), that later became the quartet As Melindrosas with the inclusion of her friend Paula. The first LP Disco Baby was a huge success, reaching the mark of 1 million copies sold.

Miranda started her solo career in 1986, the year she released her first album.
