= Tercio Sampaio Ferraz Jr. =

Brazilian jurist and author

Tercio Sampaio Ferraz Jr. is a Brazilian jurist and author of several legal philosophy books used in law schools throughout Brazil.

== Background ==
In 1964, he graduated in Philosophy and Humanities, from the University of São Paulo (USP). He also graduated in 1964 in Legal and Social Sciences from the same university. Ferraz Jr. obtained a doctorate degree in Philosophy in 1968 from the University of Mainz, and a doctorate degree in Law in 1970 at USP, where he had Miguel Reale as a coach. In 1974, he obtained a post-doctorate degree in Legal Philosophy.

Ferraz Jr. is currently a consultant for the Coordination of Improvement of Higher Education Personnel, professor at the Autonomous University of Law, professor at the Pontifícia Universidade Católica de São Paulo and professor of the Department of Philosophy of Law, Faculty of Law, University of São Paulo, Largo San Francisco, where his predecessor in the chair was Prof. Goffredo da Silva Telles Jr.

Ferraz Jr. has experience and writings in various areas of the law, including issues on the: law, democracy, power, constitution and economic order.

== Publications ==
Tercio Sampaio Ferraz Jr. has more than 90 articles published in professional journals. Sixteen books, especially Studies of Philosophy of Law (2002) and Introduction to the Study of Law: Technical Decision and Domination (1988) Six books-collection of several authors with the participation in each, with a chapter. More than 150 magazine articles and newspaper information. Dozens of prefaces. His book "INTRODUÇÃO AO ESTUDO DO DIREITO: Técnica, Decisão, Dominação," has six editions in Portuguese by Brazilian editorial company Atlas. The Sixth edition was translated into Spanish as "Introducción al Estudio del Derecho: Técnica, Decisión y Dominación" by Prof. Javier El-Hage and published simultaneously in Madrid, Barcelona and Buenos Aires by Spanish editorial company Marcial Pons.
