= Bela Vista do Paraíso =

Coordinates: 23°00′S 51°12′W

- Municipality
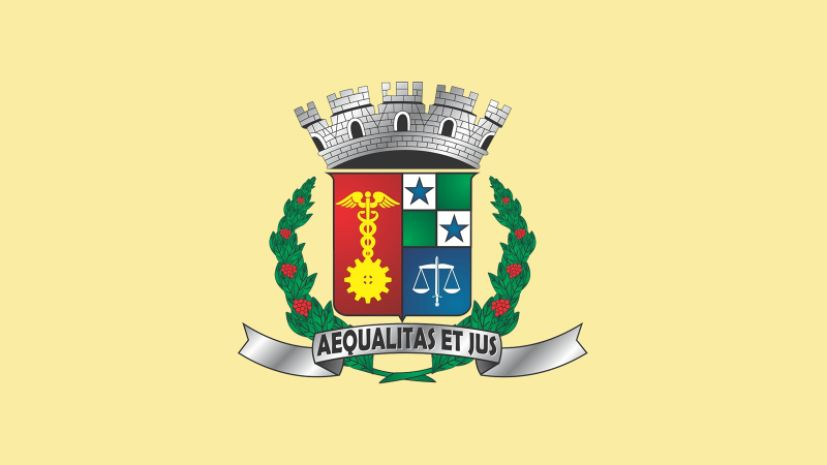
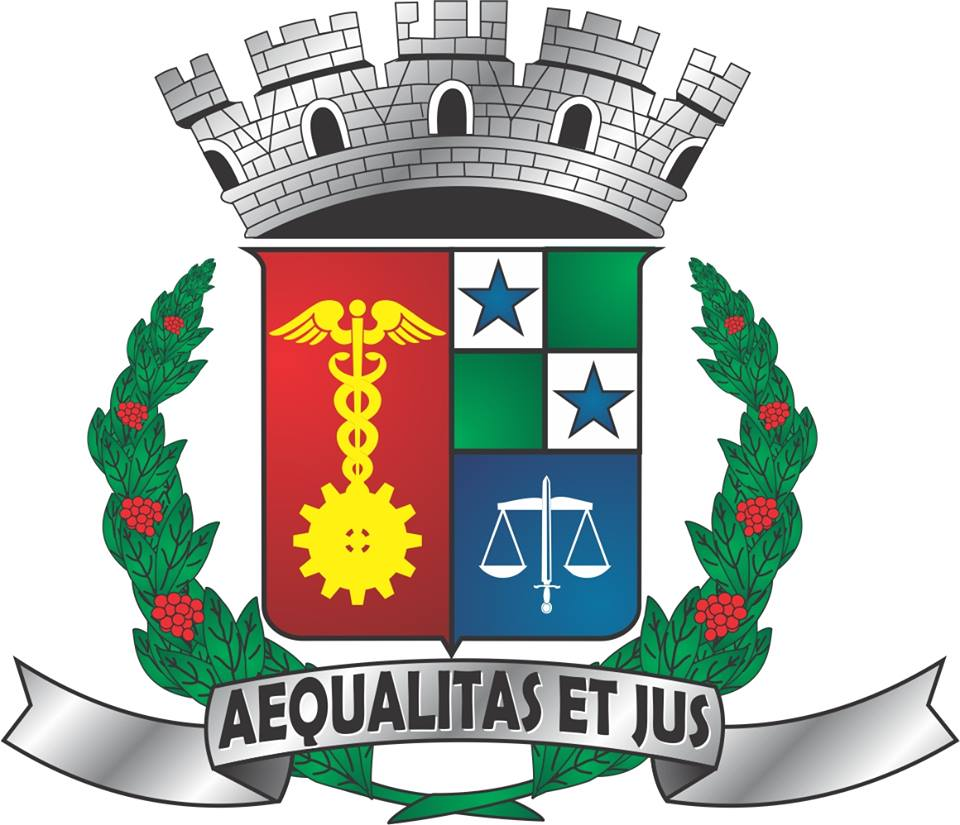
- Flag Coat of arms
- Interactive map of Bela Vista do Paraíso
- Country: Brazil
- Region: Southern
- State: Paraná
- Mesoregion: Norte Central Paranaense

Population (2020)
  - Total: 15,399
- Time zone: UTC−3 (BRT)

Bela Vista do Paraíso is a municipality in the state of Paraná in the Southern Region of Brazil. Bela Vista do Paraiso is a municipality in the Brazilian state of Paraná, belonging to the metropolitan area of Londrina. Its population in 2020 is 15,399 inhabitants. A history of Bela Vista of Paraíso: In the late 1920s, the lands were part of the current municipality of Creek Red Forest large farm owned by a Colonization Company. In 1928 the Company made the subdivision of their land into smaller plots in the hope of attracting buyers for the planting of coffee. The venture was successful and attracted people flocking conditions for creation of a village. Was elevated to the category of municipality on 10 October 1947, being dismembered in Sertanópolis only on December 14, 1953

Bela Vista do Paraíso in Paraná

== Climate ==
Climate data for Bela Vista do Paraíso, elevation 600 m (2,000 ft), (1972–2015)
Month	Jan	Feb	Mar	Apr	May	Jun	Jul	Aug	Sep	Oct	Nov	Dec	Year
Record high °C (°F)	36.0 (96.8)	37.4 (99.3)	38.4 (101.1)	34.6 (94.3)	32.0 (89.6)	29.8 (85.6)	31.4 (88.5)	34.6 (94.3)	37.2 (99.0)	38.6 (101.5)	38.6 (101.5)	36.8 (98.2)	38.6 (101.5)
Mean daily maximum °C (°F)	29.2 (84.6)	29.5 (85.1)	29.4 (84.9)	27.6 (81.7)	24.1 (75.4)	23.0 (73.4)	23.4 (74.1)	25.8 (78.4)	26.5 (79.7)	28.4 (83.1)	29.0 (84.2)	29.1 (84.4)	27.1 (80.8)
Daily mean °C (°F)	23.9 (75.0)	24.1 (75.4)	23.7 (74.7)	21.9 (71.4)	18.8 (65.8)	17.7 (63.9)	17.7 (63.9)	19.5 (67.1)	20.4 (68.7)	22.3 (72.1)	23.2 (73.8)	23.7 (74.7)	21.4 (70.5)
Mean daily minimum °C (°F)	20.0 (68.0)	20.2 (68.4)	19.5 (67.1)	17.7 (63.9)	15.0 (59.0)	13.8 (56.8)	13.4 (56.1)	14.5 (58.1)	15.4 (59.7)	17.3 (63.1)	18.3 (64.9)	19.5 (67.1)	17.1 (62.7)
Record low °C (°F)	11.6 (52.9)	12.6 (54.7)	9.7 (49.5)	4.2 (39.6)	1.4 (34.5)	0.4 (32.7)	−2.0 (28.4)	1.0 (33.8)	1.0 (33.8)	7.8 (46.0)	10.4 (50.7)	12.8 (55.0)	−2.0 (28.4)
Average precipitation mm (inches)	221.9 (8.74)	163.4 (6.43)	132.8 (5.23)	97.9 (3.85)	108.1 (4.26)	87.8 (3.46)	66.8 (2.63)	45.6 (1.80)	110.2 (4.34)	144.3 (5.68)	159.3 (6.27)	191.2 (7.53)	1,529.3 (60.22)
Average precipitation days (≥ 1.0 mm)	15	13	11	7	8	7	5	5	8	10	10	13	112
Average relative humidity (%)	77	76	72	71	73	73	67	60	64	66	67	74	70
Mean monthly sunshine hours	203.2	192.2	219.7	226.6	213.0	203.4	226.5	236.2	199.7	219.7	225.3	214.2	2,579.7
Source: IDR-Paraná

== See also ==
- List of municipalities in Paraná
