= Ilhados com a Sogra =

Brazilian reality TV series

- Genre: Reality
- Created by: Mixer Films
- Presented by: Fernanda Souza
- Country of origin: Brazil
- Original language: Portuguese
- No. of series: 2
- No. of episodes: 16

Production
- Running time: 42–57 minutes
- Production companies: Mixer Films; Floresta (season 2)

Original release
- Network: Netflix
- Release: October 9, 2023 – present

Ilhados com a Sogra (English: Stranded with my Mother-in-Law) is a Brazilian reality competition format originally created by Mixer Films and hosted by Fernanda Souza which premiered on Netflix on October 9, 2023.

On the show, six couples embark on a journey to a mysterious island to compete in challenges for a life-changing prize of R$500.000, unaware that their mothers-in-law are also present.

Upon arrival, they discover that in fact, sons-in-law and daughters-in-law will have their mothers-in-law as teammates instead of their romantic partners, who will be exiled in a bunker on the other side of the island while watching their every move.

== Episodes ==
Season	Episodes	Originally released	
Season	Episodes	First released	Last released
1	8	October 9, 2023	October 16, 2023
2	8	January 2, 2025	January 9, 2025

== Other appearances ==
In addition to appearing on Ilhados com a Sogra, some of the cast members went on to compete in other reality TV shows.

- A Grande Conquista

Cast Member	Season	Result	Finish
Vinicius Sassone; Season 1	2	Not selected	95th

- Power Couple

Cast Member	Season	Result	Finish
Ana Paula Marquez; Season 2	7	Eliminated 6th	8th
Antony Marquez; Season 2	7	Eliminated 6th	8th
