= A Grande Conquista 2 =

Season of television series

- Season 2
- Hosted by: Rachel Sheherazade
- No. of days: 89
- No. of contestants: 20
- Winner: Kaio Perroni
- Runner-up: João Hadad
- Companion show: O Grande React
- No. of episodes: 88

Release
- Original network: RecordTV
- Original release: April 22 – July 18, 2024

Additional information
- Filming dates: April 21 – July 18, 2024

Season chronology
- ← Previous; Season 1

A Grande Conquista 2 was the second and final season of the Brazilian reality television series A Grande Conquista, which premiered on Monday, April 22, 2024, on RecordTV. Under the direction of Rodrigo Carelli, the show is commanded by Lucas Selfie and Ju Nogueira on digital platforms and hosted for the first time by Rachel Sheherazade, (replacing Mariana Rios, who left the show) she who makes her debut as the new host of the series.

On July 18, 2024, advisor Kaio Perroni won the competition with 51.83% of the public vote over digital influencer João Hadad (35.19%), comedian Will Rambo (9.53%) and actor Fernando Sampaio (3.45%).

== Format ==
Unlike the first season, the second has undergone some changes in format, now reducing the stages to just two.

=== Stage 1 ===
In the Villa, the 100 candidates live in three houses (starting with 47 in the Orange house, 33 in the Blue house and 20 in the Green house), having to share beds and limited supplies for 19 days, while facing a series of challenges and mass evictions. The last 30 to survive in the Villa compete in the final challenge, in which the public decides whether the winner secures a place in the next stage of the game. Then, the remaining candidates face the final public vote for the last spots in the Mansion.

The new thing on this season is that the Villa's owners, when they win the challenges, get a bigger advantage Whether of which house they end up in, the leader is sent to a house of a different color (or the same one if that's the case) and receives missions from the production and the external audience The main goal is to convince the contestant to stay in the show through mental games, and if any contestant gives up, the house where the owner is (whether it's the opponent's or not) gets punished. In addition, the top six Villagers from the second to the fourth eviction and the winner of the last Safety Challenge, secure a direct spot in the Mansion.

==== Mansion spots competition ====
The cast of 100 (later 101) official contestants was unveiled on April 18, 2024, four days before the season's premiere.

Two of the original 100 villagers cast contestants needed to be isolated for health reasons and later reentered the competition: Vinigram, who tested positive for H3N2 flu, recovered and entered the group on the second day. Ysani Kalapalo, diagnosed with COVID-19, was initially disqualified and replaced by Lara Costa, but was eventually reintegrated to the cast after Gaby Fontenelle's withdrawal.

No.	Candidate	Type	Age	Hometown	Occupation	Week 1			Week 2	
No.	Candidate	Type	Age	Hometown	Occupation	Day 5	Day 9	Day 12	Day 16	Day 19
05	Anahí Rodrighero	Civilian	30	Brasiléia	Businesswoman	Nominated	Most Voted	Selected		
18	Cel Hayashi	Civilian	28	Tokyo, Japan	Digital influencer	Nominated	Most Voted	Selected		
14	Bruno Cardoso	Civilian	31	São Caetano do Sul	Clown & presenter	Nominated	Exempt	Most Voted	Selected	
28	Geni Grohalski	Civilian	48	Capitão Leônidas Marques	Seller	Exempt	Exempt	Most Voted	Selected	
48	João Hadad	Celebrity	30	Guarapari	Businessman & digital influencer	Nominated	Exempt	Exempt	Most Voted	Selected
53	Kaio Perroni	Civilian	24	Campinas	Advisor & army official	Nominated	Exempt	Exempt	Most Voted	Selected
10	Brenno Pavarini	Celebrity	30	Birigui	Actor & personal trainer	Exempt	Nominated	Exempt	Nominated	Selected
17	Cátia Paganote	Celebrity	48	Brasília	Former Paquita	Exempt	Nominated	Exempt	Nominated	Selected
21	Claudia Baronesa	Celebrity	50	São Paulo	Businesswoman	Exempt	Exempt	Nominated	Nominated	Selected
29	Edlaine Barboza	Civilian	29	Rio de Janeiro	Model	Nominated	Saved	Owner	Nominated	Selected
32	Fellipe Villas	Civilian	36	Belo Horizonte	Military police	Nominated	Exempt	Exempt	Nominated	Selected
33	Fernando Sampaio	Celebrity	45	Salvador	Actor	Exempt	Exempt	Saved	Exempt	Selected
39	Guipa Pallesi	Celebrity	36	São Paulo	Broadcaster	Exempt	Exempt	Nominated	Exempt	Selected
42	Hideo Matsunaga	Civilian	36	Ponta Porã	Japanese teacher & singer	Saved	Exempt	Saved	Nominated	Selected
56	Liziane Gutierrez	Celebrity	37	Rio de Janeiro	Digital influencer	Exempt	Exempt	Nominated	Nominated	Selected
57	Lucas de Albú	Civilian	27	Fortaleza	Model & nutritionist	Saved	Owner	Nominated	Saved	Selected
70	MC Mari	Celebrity	27	Itabuna	Singer & songwriter	Nominated	Nominated	Exempt	Nominated	Selected
87	Taty Pink	Celebrity	34	São Pedro da Água Branca	Physical education teacher & singer	Exempt	Nominated	Nominated	Nominated	Selected
96	Vinigram	Celebrity	31	São Paulo	Singer	Nominated	Exempt	Exempt	Nominated	Selected
99	Will Rambo	Civilian	46	Tucuruí	Comedian & singer	Exempt	Exempt	Nominated	Nominated	Selected
06	Andreia Andrade	Celebrity	52	São Paulo	Businesswoman	Exempt	Nominated	Exempt	Nominated	2.97%
69	MC Jey Jey	Celebrity	26	Belo Horizonte	Singer & waitress	Exempt	Nominated	Exempt	Saved	2.86%
12	Brunna Bernardy	Civilian	37	São Paulo	Businesswoman & singer	Exempt	Exempt	Nominated	Nominated	2.80%
08	Bifão	Celebrity	34	Osasco	Chef & digital influencer	Exempt	Exempt	Nominated	Exempt	2.78%
49	João Victor Pinto	Civilian	23	Bragança Paulista	Veterinarian	Nominated	Nominated	Exempt	Nominated	2.76%
36	Gabriela Rossi	Celebrity	29	Porto Velho	Model	Saved	Owner	Saved	Exempt	2.61%
55	Lippe Rodrigues	Civilian	32	São Bernardo do Campo	Singer	Exempt	Nominated	Nominated	Saved	2.44%
101	Ysani Kalapalo (Note: After initially being disqualified for testing positive for COVID-19, Ysani Kalapalo returned to the show after Gaby Fontenelle's withdrawal.)	Celebrity	33	Parque do Xingu	Indigenous activist & youtuber	Not in villa	Nominated	Exempt	Nominated	2.42%
41	Heitor Ximenis	Civilian	25	Porto de Moz	Digital influencer	Exempt	Exempt	Nominated	Nominated	2.00%
23	Clevinho Santana	Celebrity	31	Arauá	Singer	Exempt	Exempt	Saved	Owner	1.97%
45	Jaline Araújo	Civilian	22	Cachoeiras de Macacu	Hairdresser & receptionist	Exempt	Saved	Owner	Saved	1.94%
90	Thiago Cirillo	Civilian	30	Brasília	Athlete & businessman	Exempt	Exempt	Saved	Exempt	1.75%
64	Manoelzinho Gomes	Civilian	30	Dom Pedro	Teacher	Exempt	Exempt	Saved	Owner	1.36%
19	Charles Daves	Celebrity	46	Rio de Janeiro	Actor & presenter	Exempt	Nominated	Exempt	Exempt	1.00%
68	Maysa Reis	Civilian	33	Aracaju	Presenter & singer	Exempt	Exempt	Saved	Exempt	0.98%
91	Thiago Luz	Civilian	30	Vila Velha	Dental surgeon & singer	Exempt	Exempt	Saved	Owner	0.49%
71	Michael Calasans	Civilian	31	Santo André	App driver	Exempt	Nominated	Exempt	2.23%	
63	Maizy Magalhães	Civilian	27	Chapada Gaúcha	Dental student	Saved	Nominated	Exempt	2.01%	
24	Brunno Danese	Civilian	25	Uberlândia	Events producer	Saved	Owner	Exempt	2.00%	
38	Graci Zermiani	Celebrity	42	Ibirama	Golfer & nutritionist	Exempt	Exempt	Exempt	1.93%	
97	Vivi Fernandez	Celebrity	46	Brasília	Actress	Exempt	Exempt	Exempt	1.90%	
01	Aline Bina	Civilian	39	Salvador	Nurse	Exempt	Exempt	Exempt	1.69%	
26	Danilo Garcia	Civilian	38	Araraquara	Medical student & personal trainer	Exempt	Nominated	Exempt	1.53%	
78	Poliana Roberta	Civilian	29	São João Del Rei	Actress & veterinary medicine student	Nominated	Exempt	Exempt	1.32%	
07	Biel Azevedo	Celebrity	35	Rio de Janeiro	Actor	Saved	Exempt	Saved	1.08%	
80	Raphinha Hoffman	Civilian	33	Rancharia	Businessman & public relations at events	Exempt	Saved	Exempt	0.83%	
74	Nathana Britto	Civilian	30	Paulo Afonso	Beautician & lash designer	Exempt	Exempt	Exempt	0.73%	
44	Izumed	Civilian	34	Contagem	Audio engineer & musician	Exempt	Exempt	Exempt	0.71%	
67	Matheus Destri	Civilian	27	Guarujá	Actor & model	Saved	Exempt	Exempt	0.60%	
22	Claudia Cramo	Civilian	49	São Paulo	Journalist & public relations	Owner	Exempt	Exempt	0.53%	
100	Lara Costa (Note: Lara Costa entered the competition replacing potential candidate Ysani Kalapalo, who was diagnosed with COVID-19 and did not receive medical clearance to enter the show.)	Civilian	34	São Paulo	Environment decorator	Exempt	Saved	Exempt	0.47%	
59	Luciano Rodrigues	Civilian	58	São Leopoldo	Elderly caregiver & work safety technician	Exempt	Saved	Owner	0.38%	
50	Jonas Bento	Celebrity	37	São Paulo	Singer & songwriter	Exempt	Exempt	Saved	0.33%	
15	Cacau Luz	Civilian	30	Pouso Alegre	Actress & production engineer	Owner	Exempt	Nominated	Walked	
25	Dani Bavoso	Celebrity	45	Belo Horizonte	Actress & reporter	Exempt	Exempt	1.85%		
11	Bruninho Mano	Civilian	33	São Roque, São Paulo	Comedian & businessman	Exempt	Exempt	1.85%		
16	Carolina Roland	Civilian	29	Limeira	Subscription club manager	Exempt	Nominated	1.80%		
72	Michelle Heiden	Civilian	30	Francisco Beltrão	Mentor & model	Exempt	Exempt	1.76%		
30	Fábio Gontijo	Celebrity	39	Divinópolis	Dermatologist	Exempt	Exempt	1.71%		
85	Stephany Carvalho	Civilian	27	São Paulo	Marketing & engagement analyst	Exempt	Exempt	1.63%		
93	Vanessa Di Santo	Civilian	41	Itu	Nutritionist	Exempt	Exempt	1.63%		
62	Madson Formagini	Celebrity	37	Volta Redonda	Former football player	Owner	Exempt	1.59%		
79	Preta Praiana	Civilian	48	Alexânia	Businesswoman	Exempt	Exempt	1.58%		
98	Wellen Rocha	Civilian	28	Trindade	Plus size model	Exempt	Exempt	1.28%		
58	Luciana Mirihad	Civilian	47	São Paulo	Culinarian	Exempt	Exempt	1.17%		
20	Cibelle Mestre	Civilian	51	Birigui	Commercial manager	Exempt	Exempt	1.08%		
95	Vinicius Venturini	Civilian	37	São Paulo	Electronic technician & seller	Exempt	Exempt	1.01%		
02	Amanda Martins	Civilian	41	Rio de Janeiro	Businesswoman	Exempt	Exempt	0.72%		
46	Jéssica Marisol	Celebrity	34	Santos Dumont	Digital influencer & nurse	Exempt	Exempt	0.65%		
40	Hanny Boni	Celebrity	31	São Paulo	Digital influencer & singer	Exempt	Exempt	0.60%		
73	Nadya França	Civilian	50	Belo Horizonte	MMA announcer	Exempt	Exempt	0.38%		
04	Ana Paula Oliveira	Civilian	50	Santo Antônio da Patrulha	Businesswoman & model	Exempt	Nominated	Walked		
31	Fabrício Almeida	Civilian	28	Campo Mourão	Actor	Exempt	1.57%			
75	Nelson Albuquerque	Civilian	61	Porto Alegre	Seller	Exempt	1.40%			
86	Tatiane Melo	Civilian	32	Pão de Açúcar	Actress	Exempt	1.27%			
65	Márcia Barroz	Civilian	51	São Paulo	Businesswoman & condominium administrator	Exempt	1.13%			
92	Uarzancler Zuckerman	Civilian	47	São João de Meriti	Actor & producer	Exempt	1.12%			
77	Neuma Carolina	Civilian	29	Salvador	Actress	Exempt	1.05%			
51	Jordana Guimarães	Civilian	41	Belo Horizonte	Digital influencer	Exempt	1.00%			
89	Theo Black	Civilian	40	Campinas	Actor & psychologist	Exempt	0.98%			
54	Leonardo Saavedra	Civilian	29	Ipatinga	Actor	Exempt	0.90%			
13	Bruno Canaan	Civilian	41	Betim	Actor & model	Exempt	0.82%			
88	Thay Sampaio	Civilian	25	Osasco	Actress & model	Exempt	0.79%			
43	Ingrid Caravellas	Celebrity	54	Rio de Janeiro	Former volleyball player	Exempt	0.57%			
76	Nemo Pimenta	Civilian	44	São Paulo	App driver & martial arts teacher	Exempt	0.55%			
83	Rita Assumpção	Civilian	59	São Paulo	Educational counselor & retired	Exempt	0.37%			
27	Diego Silva	Civilian	37	Salvador	Chef	Exempt	0.17%			
82	Ricardo Costa	Celebrity	53	Marília	Gourmet chef	Exempt	Ejected			
60	Gustavo Mustafe	Civilian	30	Mococa	Banker	Exempt	Walked			
03	Ana Karolina Abreu	Civilian	22	São Paulo	Nursing technique	Exempt	Walked			
61	Luiza Aragão	Celebrity	36	Brasília	Digital influencer	2.86%				
09	Billy Santana	Civilian	23	Santos	Administrative assistant & student	2.64%				
81	Ratinho	Civilian	46	São Paulo	Aquarist	2.48%				
52	Kadu Rodrigues	Civilian	35	Guarulhos	Advisor & digital influencer	2.34%				
94	Vini Sassone	Celebrity	39	Rio de Janeiro	Nutritionist	2.33%				
84	Sandro França	Civilian	30	Katueté, Paraguay	Construction worker	2.31%				
66	Marcus Cowboy	Celebrity	24	Trindade	Businessman	1.81%				
47	Jo Werner	Civilian	26	Não-Me-Toque	Medical student & youtuber	1.16%				
35	Fran Sabino	Civilian	33	Patos	Bartender & inspector	0.81%				
34	Flavinha Cheirosa	Celebrity	45	São Paulo	Presenter & singer	0.45%				
37	Gaby Fontenelle	Celebrity	37	São Paulo	Dancer & physical educator	Walked				

=== Stage 2 ===
The 20 selected contestants move into the Mansion on week 3. Each week, two contestants become the Mansion's owners and delegate the weekly tasks, while three contestants are voted into the Risk Zone (the Owners' nominee, the Secret vote nominee between the two Owners and the Mansion's face-to-face vote nominee among all eligible contestants), where they compete in the Safety challenge to escape eviction.

The Safety winner is exempt from nominations, however, they must replace themselves with another contestant of their choice in order to determine that week's set of nominees who would face the public vote.

==== Display scheme ====
- Monday: Discord Activities
- Tuesday: Risk Zone (live)
- Wednesday: Safety Challenge (live)
- Thursday: Eviction (live)
- Friday: Mansion's owners Tasks of the Week
- Saturday: Coexistence + Party (live flashes)
- Sunday: Party

== Controversies ==
=== Contestants with health problems ===
Before starting the show tasks, 98 out of the 100 contestants entered, as two competitors (known as villagers before they are promoted to the mansion) needed to be isolated for health reasons. Host Rachel Sheherazade had not revealed who the two absent contestants were, but shortly after, the scene of Vinícius de Paula entering his mates in the orange house aired. Vinigram, as he is known, had tested positive for H3N2 flu but managed to recover in time.

The second undisclosed competitor was indigenous influencer Ysani Kalapalo, who tested positive for COVID-19. Ysani ended up being disqualified from the show for recovery, never entering the other contestants and was replaced by Lara Costa. But was eventually reintegrated to the cast after Gaby Fontenelle's withdrawal.

=== Ricardo Costa's ejection ===
In the early hours of April 26 to 27, 2024, Ricardo Costa and Fábio Gontijo had a strong argument in the bedroom of the orange house. The incident began when singer MC Mari found a wet red swim trunk on her bed. The singer had asked to change beds with Fábio after asking who the piece of clothing belonged to. Then, the pair start a quick argument, which would extend after Fábio threw his wet swim trunks at Ricardo, who soon after start an argument. The gourmet chef leaves the room after the altercation with the dermatologist and goes towards the kitchen and grabs a knife, but is restrained by other contestants. While those outside created a barrier to prevent him from entering, those inside the room locked and requested the ejection of the contestant, announcing to the camera that the situation has crossed the line. Ending the fight, Vinigram complained about living with the gourmet chef, as well as the other contestants.

On the morning of the 27th, Ricardo left the show, but without the production clarifying to the public if he was ejected or if he gave up, leaving even the team of the then contestant without a position on the matter, since the exclusive cameras of PlayPlus did not film that moment. Soon after, RecordTV confirmed the gourmet chef's ejection and made available an snippet of the scene of the moment when Costa went to the kitchen to get the knife and was prevented from entering the room, leaving to air the moment of his departure and a clearer explanation, with the right to the reaction of the confinement colleagues with the warning, only on the evening edition of television.

=== Fellipe Villas' removal and arrest ===
On April 25, 2024, it was reported by external news portals that the contestant Fellipe Villas had his license request denied by the Military Police of Espírito Santo. Villas, who is a military police officer, would have signed up to enter in the show and when he was called by the production, he requested his request for temporary dismissal, which was not accepted by the corporation.

Even so, Fellipe entered the show, which led the PM-ES to open an administrative proceeding against the contestant for disobedience, but it was not revealed if there would be any dismissal.

On July 12, 2024, around 1:13 PM, Villas was called by the production of the show and from there his withdrawal from the show was announced. Subsequently, he was arrested for desertion by the Military Police of São Paulo, following a complaint from the Capixaba Police, to where he would be sent later It was also revealed that Fellipe had presented a psychiatric report to participate in the show, taking a 90-day leave starting from April 15, and that he was supposed to report to the corporation after completing the 30 days of leave, which would have been on May 15. However, this did not happen as the police officer was on the show. In June, the salary of the contestant from the PM-ES was blocked and the funds were returned to the state treasury.

=== Accusations of racism ===
==== Cibelle Mestre ====
On April 25, 2024, a snippet of conversation of Cibelle Mestre started circulating with some contestants at the lunch table at the blue house, where she asserts that most of the women in her family are married to Black men. She also mentioned that her cousins advised her that when she meets "a Black man", she would fall in love because they are "wonderful" and not in the "sense of sensuality" and "respectful way". These statements caused negative reactions on social media.

==== Cátia Paganote ====
On April 30, 2024, after being evicted, Thay Sampaio revealed that she had been a victim of racism by Cátia Paganote. According to Thay, the contestant said that her hair looked like a "bird's nest" and that she should understand the speech as a compliment.

Thay would have had a disagreement with Cátia, but the scenes were not aired on the live show, nor on the exclusive cameras of PlayPlus. As a means of defense, Cátia even said that she was not racist, as her best friend was black.

On May 10, 2024, Thay revealed that he would sue his lawyers against Paganote. "I'm here now accompanied by my lawyer José. Luís is the one who will give me full support in this process that I will continue, not only for myself, but for millions of people who also felt offended and who are going through this. Yes, unfortunately, still in 2024", she said.

=== Punctured condoms ===
On April 29, 2024, Bifão tried to fill some leaky condoms with water to troll the other contestants. However, the digital influencer noticed that they were pierced and then threw them away, in addition to drawing the attention of the reality production, which immediately cut the footage to another room, but did not prevent such a moment from being recorded by the public.

The scene ended up generating a debate on some websites about the responsibility of the show's team in any cases involving safe sex.

=== Error in the Safety Challenge ===
On July 3, 2024, contestant Will Rambo had won the Safety Challenge and nominated João Hadad in his place for the popular vote in the Risk Zone, along with Anahí Rodrighero and Fernando Sampaio. However, an hour later, it was alleged that presenter Rachel Sheherazade had unknowingly given Rambo an obvious hint in a challenge question. After the error was found, the popular vote of the Risk Zone was suspended and, soon after the decision of the production, the result of the test was annulled and Rambo returned to the hot seat and Hadad was kept in the mansion, being removed from the public's evaluation.

== Contestants ==
On March 13, 2024, RecordTV announced that applications for the second season of the show were open.

Six contestants secured a spot in the Mansion as the most voted from the Risk Zones during the Villa's stage. The remaining 14 contestants were automatically promoted to the Mansion on May 9, 2024, after surviving the fifth Risk Zone.

Below is the cast of 20 official contestants for this season, with the occupations listed by the official show website and their respective ages at the start of filming.

Contestant	Type	Age	Hometown	Occupation	Stage 1		Stage 2		Status	Finish
Contestant	Type	Age	Hometown	Occupation	Entered	Exited	Entered	Exited	Status	Finish
Claudia Baronesa	Celebrity	50	São Paulo	Businesswoman	Day 1	Day 19	Day 19	Day 26	Eliminated 1st on May 16, 2024	20th
MC Mari	Celebrity	27	Itabuna	Singer & songwriter	Day 1	Day 19	Day 19	Day 33	Eliminated 2nd on May 23, 2024	19th
Vinigram	Celebrity	31	São Paulo	Singer	Day 2	Day 19	Day 19	Day 40	Eliminated 3rd on May 30, 2024	18th
Edlaine Barboza	Civilian	29	Rio de Janeiro	Model	Day 1	Day 19	Day 19	Day 47	Eliminated 4th on June 6, 2024	17th
Cátia Paganote	Celebrity	48	Brasília	Former Paquita	Day 1	Day 19	Day 19	Day 54	Eliminated 5th on June 13, 2024	16th
Bruno Cardoso	Civilian	31	São Caetano do Sul	Clown & presenter	Day 1	Day 12	Day 19	Day 61	Eliminated 6th on June 20, 2024	15th
Lucas de Albú	Civilian	27	Fortaleza	Model & nutritionist	Day 1	Day 19	Day 19	Day 68	Eliminated 7th on June 27, 2024	14th
Anahí Rodrighero	Civilian	30	Brasiléia	Businesswoman	Day 1	Day 9	Day 19	Day 75	Eliminated 8th on July 4, 2024	13th
Geni Grohalski	Civilian	48	Capitão Leônidas Marques	Seller	Day 1	Day 12	Day 19	Day 81	Eliminated 9th on July 10, 2024	12th
Liziane Gutierrez	Celebrity	37	Rio de Janeiro	Digital influencer	Day 1	Day 19	Day 19	Day 82	Eliminated 10th on July 11, 2024	11th
Fellipe Villas	Civilian	36	Belo Horizonte	Military police	Day 1	Day 19	Day 19	Day 83	Removed on July 12, 2024	10th
Brenno Pavarini	Celebrity	30	Birigui	Actor & personal trainer	Day 1	Day 19	Day 19	Day 84	Eliminated 11th on July 13, 2024	9th
Cel Hayashi	Civilian	28	Tokyo, Japan	Digital influencer	Day 1	Day 9	Day 19	Day 86	Eliminated 12th on July 15, 2024	8th
Guipa Pallesi	Celebrity	36	São Paulo	Broadcaster	Day 1	Day 19	Day 19	Day 86	Eliminated 13th on July 15, 2024	7th
Hideo Matsunaga	Civilian	36	Ponta Porã	Japanese teacher & singer	Day 1	Day 19	Day 19	Day 87	Eliminated 14th on July 16, 2024	6th
Taty Pink	Celebrity	34	São Pedro da Água Branca	Physical education teacher & singer	Day 1	Day 19	Day 19	Day 87	Eliminated 15th on July 16, 2024	5th
Fernando Sampaio	Celebrity	45	Salvador	Actor	Day 1	Day 19	Day 19	Day 89	Fourth place on July 18, 2024	4th
Will Rambo	Civilian	46	Tucuruí	Comedian & singer	Day 1	Day 19	Day 19	Day 89	Third place on July 18, 2024	3rd
João Hadad	Celebrity	30	Guarapari	Businessman & digital influencer	Day 1	Day 16	Day 19	Day 89	Runner-up on July 18, 2024	2nd
Kaio Perroni	Civilian	24	Campinas	Advisor & army official	Day 1	Day 16	Day 19	Day 89	Winner on July 18, 2024	1st

== Future Appearances ==
In 2024, Gabriela Rossi, Michael Calasans and Vivi Fernandez appeared in A Fazenda 16, they entered in the Warehouse where the public voted for four contestants to move into the main house. Gabriela and Michael didn't receive enough votes to enter in the game, while Vivi received enough votes to enter in the game and finished in 24th place in the competition.

== The game ==
=== Owner selection's results ===
	Week 3	Week 4	Week 5	Week 6	Week 7	Week 8	Week 9	Week 10	Week 11	Week 12
Candidates	Anahí; Baronesa; Bruno; Cátia; Cel; Fernando; Hadad; Hideo; Kaio; Mari	Anahí; Bruno; Cátia; Cel; Edlaine; Fellipe; Geni; Guipa; Hadad; Kaio; Lucas; Mari; Taty; Vinigram	Cel; Hideo; Vinigram	Anahí; Brenno; Bruno; Cátia; Cel; Edlaine; Fellipe; Fernando; Geni; Guipa; Hadad; Kaio; Liziane; Taty; Will	Cel; Fellipe; Geni; Kaio	Brenno; Cel; Fellipe; Guipa; Hadad; Liziane	Anahí; Brenno; Cel; Fernando; Geni; Hadad; Hideo; Kaio; Liziane; Lucas; Taty; Will	Anahí; Cel; Fellipe; Fernando; Geni; Guipa; Hadad; Hideo; Liziane; Taty; Will	Brenno; Geni	Brenno; Cel; Fellipe; Fernando; Hadad; Hideo; Kaio; Taty; Will
Kaio	Nominated	Nominated	Not eligible	Nominated	Nominated	Not eligible	Nominated	Not eligible	Not eligible	Nominated
Hadad	Nominated	Nominated	Not eligible	Nominated	Not eligible	Nominated	Nominated	Nominated	Not eligible	Nominated
Will	Not eligible	Not eligible	Not eligible	Nominated	Not eligible	Not eligible	Nominated	Nominated	Not eligible	Nominated
Fernando	Nominated	Not eligible	Not eligible	Nominated	Not eligible	Not eligible	Nominated	Nominated	Not eligible	Nominated
Taty	Not eligible	Nominated	Not eligible	Nominated	Not eligible	Not eligible	Nominated	Nominated	Not eligible	Nominated
Hideo	Nominated	Not eligible	Nominated	Not eligible	Not eligible	Not eligible	Nominated	Nominated	Not eligible	Nominated
Guipa	Not eligible	Nominated	Not eligible	Nominated	Not eligible	Nominated	Not eligible	Nominated	Not eligible	Not eligible
Cel	Nominated	Nominated	Nominated	Nominated	Nominated	Nominated	Nominated	Nominated	Not eligible	Nominated
Brenno	Not eligible	Not eligible	Not eligible	Nominated	Not eligible	Nominated	Nominated	Not eligible	Nominated	Nominated
Fellipe	Not eligible	Nominated	Not eligible	Nominated	Nominated	Nominated	Not eligible	Nominated	Not eligible	Nominated
Liziane	Not eligible	Not eligible	Not eligible	Nominated	Not eligible	Nominated	Nominated	Nominated	Not eligible	
Geni	Not eligible	Nominated	Not eligible	Nominated	Nominated	Not eligible	Nominated	Nominated	Nominated	
Anahí	Nominated	Nominated	Not eligible	Nominated	Not eligible	Not eligible	Nominated	Nominated		
Lucas	Not eligible	Nominated	Not eligible	Not eligible	Not eligible	Not eligible	Nominated			
Bruno	Nominated	Nominated	Not eligible	Nominated	Not eligible	Not eligible				
Cátia	Nominated	Nominated	Not eligible	Nominated	Not eligible					
Edlaine	Not eligible	Nominated	Not eligible	Nominated						
Vinigram	Not eligible	Nominated	Nominated							
Mari	Nominated	Nominated								
Baronesa	Nominated									
First owner	Baronesa; Won the challenge	Hadad; Won the challenge	Hideo; Won the challenge	Edlaine; Won the challenge	Geni; Won the challenge	Fellipe; Won the challenge	Kaio; Won the challenge	Anahí; Won the challenge	Geni; Won the challenge	Cel; Won the challenge
Second owner	Will; Baronesa's choice to elect	Kaio; Hadad's choice to elect	Lucas; Hideo's choice to elect	Liziane; Edlaine's choice to elect	Fernando; Geni's choice to elect	Guipa; Fellipe's choice to elect	Brenno; Kaio's choice to elect	Liziane; Anahí's choice to elect	Guipa; Geni's choice to elect	Hadad; Cel's choice to elect

=== Tasks ===
	Week 3	Week 4	Week 5	Week 6	Week 7	Week 8	Week 9	Week 10	Week 11	Week 12
Mansion owners	Baronesa; Will	Hadad; Kaio	Hideo; Lucas	Edlaine; Liziane	Geni; Fernando	Fellipe; Guipa	Kaio; Brenno	Anahí; Liziane	~~Geni~~; Guipa	Cel; Hadad
Room guests	Kaio; Mari; Vinigram	Edlaine; Fernando; Mari	Brenno; Liziane; Taty	Brenno; Bruno; Kaio	Cátia; Cel; Hadad	Hideo; Lucas; Taty	Anahí; Geni; Hideo	Cel; Guipa; Taty	Cel; Hideo; Kaio	~~Fellipe~~; Fernando; Will
Kitchen	Cátia; Geni	Brenno; Mari	Brenno; Taty	Bruno; Geni	Brenno; Liziane	Geni; Will	Guipa; Taty	Brenno; Hideo	Cel; Hideo	Brenno; Taty
Internal cleaning	Edlaine; Hideo	Liziane; Will	Edlaine; Kaio	Guipa; Hadad	Anahí; Taty	Brenno; Kaio	Anahí; Lucas	Hadad; Kaio	Fellipe; Will	Guipa; Hideo
External cleaning	Fellipe; Guipa	Bruno; Lucas	Fernando; Will	Cátia; Cel	Fellipe; Will	Bruno; Liziane	Fernando; Geni	Guipa; Will	Fernando; Kaio	Fellipe; Will

=== Voting history ===
	Week 3	Week 4	Week 5	Week 6	Week 7	Week 8	Week 9	Week 10	Week 11		Week 12			
	Week 3	Week 4	Week 5	Week 6	Week 7	Week 8	Week 9	Week 10	Day 80	Day 81	Day 83	Day 85		Finale
Mansion owners	Baronesa; Will	Hadad; Kaio	Hideo; Lucas	Edlaine; Liziane	Geni; Fernando	Fellipe; Guipa	Kaio; Brenno	Anahí; Liziane	Geni; Guipa	(none)	Cel; Hadad	(none)		(none)
Nominated (Owners)	(none)	Brenno	Cel	(none)	Taty	Fernando	Lucas	Will	Fellipe	(none)	Taty	(none)		(none)
Nominated (Secret vote)	(none)	Kaio	Lucas	(none)	Fernando	Guipa	Brenno	Anahí	Geni	(none)	Hadad	(none)		(none)
Nominated (Mansion vote)	Bruno	Anahí	Hadad	Guipa	Cátia	Bruno	Guipa	Fernando	Liziane	(none)	Brenno	(none)		(none)
Nominated (Twist)	Baronesa; Will	(none)		Edlaine; Liziane	(none)				Kaio	(none)	Guipa	Cel; Guipa; Hadad; Will	Fernando; Hideo; Kaio; Taty	(none)
Kaio	Not eligible	Owner	Lucas	Not eligible	Fernando	Guipa	Owner	Liziane	Guipa	Nominated	Hadad	Not eligible	Fernando; Hideo; Taty	Winner (Day 88)
Kaio	Mari	Owner	Brenno	Brenno	Hadad	Liziane	Guipa	Fernando	Liziane	Nominated	Brenno	Not eligible	Fernando; Hideo; Taty	Winner (Day 88)
Hadad	Not eligible	Owner	Hideo	Not eligible	Geni	Fellipe	Kaio	Anahí	Geni	Not eligible	Owner	Nominated	Not eligible	Runner-up (Day 88)
Hadad	Cel	Anahí	Liziane	Fellipe	~~Fellipe~~; Will	Will	Will	Fellipe	Kaio	Not eligible	Owner	Nominated	Not eligible	Runner-up (Day 88)
Will	Owner	Hadad	Lucas	Not eligible	Geni	Guipa	Brenno	Anahí	Guipa	Not eligible	Hadad	Guipa; Hadad; Cel	Not eligible	Third place (Day 88)
Will	Owner	Lucas	Guipa	Guipa	Cátia	Lucas	Guipa	Hadad	Liziane	Not eligible	Guipa	Guipa; Hadad; Cel	Not eligible	Third place (Day 88)
Fernando	Not eligible	Kaio	Hideo	Not eligible	Owner	Guipa	Brenno	Anahí	Geni	Nominated	Cel	Not eligible	Nominated	Fourth place (Day 88)
Fernando	Hideo	Cel	Geni	Anahí	Owner	Bruno	Geni	Fellipe	Kaio	Nominated	Brenno	Not eligible	Nominated	Fourth place (Day 88)
Taty	Not eligible	Hadad	Lucas	Not eligible	Fernando	Guipa	Kaio	Liziane	Geni	Not eligible	Hadad	Not eligible	Nominated	Evicted (Day 87)
Taty	Cátia	Cátia	Hadad	Hadad	Cátia	Geni	Exempt	Fernando	Liziane; Liziane	Not eligible	Guipa	Not eligible	Nominated	Evicted (Day 87)
Hideo	Not eligible	Kaio	Owner	Not eligible	Fernando	Guipa	Brenno	Liziane	Guipa	Not eligible	Hadad	Not eligible	Nominated	Evicted (Day 87)
Hideo	Fernando	Cel	Owner	Lucas	Cátia	~~Hadad~~; Lucas	Guipa	Fernando	Liziane; Liziane	Not eligible	Brenno	Not eligible	Nominated	Evicted (Day 87)
Guipa	Not eligible	Kaio	Hideo	Not eligible	Fernando	Owner	Brenno	Anahí	Owner	Owner	Cel	Nominated	Evicted (Day 86)	
Guipa	Bruno	Mari	~~Will~~	Will	~~Fellipe~~; Will	Owner	Will	Taty	Owner	Owner	Kaio	Nominated	Evicted (Day 86)	
Cel	Not eligible	Hadad	Lucas	Not eligible	Fernando	Fellipe	Brenno	Liziane	Guipa	Not eligible	Owner	Nominated	Evicted (Day 86)	
Cel	Mari	Lucas	Hadad	Guipa	Hadad	Lucas	Guipa	Fellipe	Brenno	Not eligible	Owner	Nominated	Evicted (Day 86)	
Brenno	Not eligible	Kaio	Lucas	Not eligible	Geni	Guipa	Owner	Anahí	Geni	Not eligible	Hadad	Evicted (Day 84)		
Brenno	Fernando	Guipa	~~Kaio~~	Guipa	Kaio	Bruno	Owner	Kaio	Kaio	Not eligible	Kaio	Evicted (Day 84)		
Fellipe	Not eligible	Hadad	Lucas	Not eligible	Fernando	Owner	Kaio	Anahí	Geni	Saved	Removed (Day 83)			
Fellipe	Cel	Anahí	Hadad	Hadad	Cátia	Owner	Guipa	Hadad	Fernando	Saved	Removed (Day 83)			
Liziane	Not eligible	Kaio	Hideo	Owner	Fernando	Guipa	Kaio	Owner	Geni	Nominated	Evicted (Day 82)			
Liziane	Bruno	Anahí	Hadad	Owner	Kaio	Bruno	Geni	Owner	Kaio	Nominated	Evicted (Day 82)			
Geni	Not eligible	Hadad	Lucas	Not eligible	Owner	Guipa	Brenno	Liziane	Owner	Evicted (Day 81)				
Geni	Guipa	Hideo	Fernando	Fernando	Owner	~~Brenno~~; Liziane	Fernando	Fernando	Owner	Evicted (Day 81)				
Anahí	Not eligible	Hadad	Lucas	Not eligible	Fernando	Guipa	Brenno	Owner	Evicted (Day 75)					
Anahí	Fernando	Lucas	Hadad	Fernando	Hadad	Will	Will	Owner	Evicted (Day 75)					
Lucas	Not eligible	Kaio	Owner	Not eligible	Geni	Fellipe	Brenno	Evicted (Day 68)						
Lucas	Bruno	Anahí	Owner	Will	Hideo	Bruno	Will	Evicted (Day 68)						
Bruno	Not eligible	Hadad	Lucas	Not eligible	Fernando	Guipa	Evicted (Day 61)							
Bruno	Cátia	Guipa	Hadad	Guipa	Cátia	Liziane	Evicted (Day 61)							
Cátia	Not eligible	Kaio	Hideo	Not eligible	Fernando	Evicted (Day 54)								
Cátia	Bruno	Guipa	Edlaine	Will	Bruno	Evicted (Day 54)								
Edlaine	Not eligible	Hadad	Lucas	Owner	Evicted (Day 47)									
Edlaine	Cátia	Cátia	Liziane	Owner	Evicted (Day 47)									
Vinigram	Not eligible	Kaio	Hideo	Evicted (Day 40)										
Vinigram	Bruno	Anahí	Kaio	Evicted (Day 40)										
Mari	Not eligible	Kaio	Evicted (Day 33)											
Mari	Cel	Guipa	Evicted (Day 33)											
Baronesa	Owner	Evicted (Day 26)												
Notes	1, 2	3, 4	5	6, 7	8	9	10, 11, 12	13, 14	15, 16, 17		18, 19	20		21
Risk zone	Baronesa; Bruno; Will	Anahí; Brenno; Kaio	Cel; Hadad; Lucas	Edlaine; Guipa; Liziane	Cátia; Fernando; Taty	Bruno; Fernando; Guipa	Brenno; Guipa; Lucas	Anahí; Fernando; Will	(none)	Fellipe; Kaio; Liziane	Brenno; Guipa; Hadad; Taty	(none)		
Safety winner	Will	Kaio	Cel	Liziane	Taty	Guipa	Brenno	~~Will~~	(none)	Fellipe	Hadad	(none)		
Nominated (Safety winner)	Guipa	Mari	Vinigram	Kaio	Hadad	Kaio	Hadad	~~Hadad~~	(none)	Fernando	Will	(none)		
Nominated for eviction	Baronesa; Bruno; Guipa	Anahí; Brenno; Mari	Hadad; Lucas; Vinigram	Edlaine; Guipa; Kaio	Cátia; Fernando; Hadad	Bruno; Fernando; Kaio	Guipa; Hadad; Lucas	Anahí; Fernando; Will	Fellipe; Geni; Kaio; Liziane	Fernando; Kaio; Liziane	Brenno; Guipa; Taty; Will	Cel; Guipa; Hadad; Will	Fernando; Hideo; Kaio; Taty	Fernando; Hadad; Kaio; Will
Removed	(none)										Fellipe	(none)		
Evicted	Baronesa; 22.70% to save	Mari; 16.98% to save	Vinigram; 19.79% to save	Edlaine; 25.22% to save	Cátia; 27.92% to save	Bruno; 23.96% to save	Lucas; 27.22% to save	Anahí; 15.58% to save	Geni; 15.27% to save	Liziane; 16.45% to save	Brenno; 13.49% to save	Cel; 11.95% to save	Hideo; 2.31% to save	Fernando; 3.45% to win
Evicted	Baronesa; 22.70% to save	Mari; 16.98% to save	Vinigram; 19.79% to save	Edlaine; 25.22% to save	Cátia; 27.92% to save	Bruno; 23.96% to save	Lucas; 27.22% to save	Anahí; 15.58% to save	Geni; 15.27% to save	Liziane; 16.45% to save	Brenno; 13.49% to save	Cel; 11.95% to save	Hideo; 2.31% to save	Will; 9.53% to win
Evicted	Baronesa; 22.70% to save	Mari; 16.98% to save	Vinigram; 19.79% to save	Edlaine; 25.22% to save	Cátia; 27.92% to save	Bruno; 23.96% to save	Lucas; 27.22% to save	Anahí; 15.58% to save	Geni; 15.27% to save	Liziane; 16.45% to save	Brenno; 13.49% to save	Guipa; 14.94% to save	Taty; 20.32% to save	Will; 9.53% to win
Evicted	Baronesa; 22.70% to save	Mari; 16.98% to save	Vinigram; 19.79% to save	Edlaine; 25.22% to save	Cátia; 27.92% to save	Bruno; 23.96% to save	Lucas; 27.22% to save	Anahí; 15.58% to save	Geni; 15.27% to save	Liziane; 16.45% to save	Brenno; 13.49% to save	Guipa; 14.94% to save	Taty; 20.32% to save	Hadad; 35.19% to win
Survived	Guipa; 30.58% to save	Brenno; 32.11% to save	Lucas; 29.39% to save	Guipa; 35.94% to save	Fernando; 31.48% to save	Fernando; 36.61% to save	Guipa; 28.53% to save	Fernando; 32.10% to save	Fellipe; 15.74% to save	Fernando; 25.76% to save	Taty; 23.69% to save	Hadad; 32.66% to save	Fernando; 28.58% to save	Kaio; 51.83% to win
Survived	Guipa; 30.58% to save	Brenno; 32.11% to save	Lucas; 29.39% to save	Guipa; 35.94% to save	Fernando; 31.48% to save	Fernando; 36.61% to save	Guipa; 28.53% to save	Fernando; 32.10% to save	Liziane; 22.97% to save	Fernando; 25.76% to save	Guipa; 24.88% to save	Hadad; 32.66% to save	Fernando; 28.58% to save	Kaio; 51.83% to win
Survived	Bruno; 46.72% to save	Anahí; 50.91% to save	Hadad; 50.82% to save	Kaio; 38.84% to save	Hadad; 40.60% to save	Kaio; 39.43% to save	Hadad; 44.25% to save	Will; 52.32% to save	Liziane; 22.97% to save	Kaio; 57.79% to save	Guipa; 24.88% to save	Will; 40.45% to save	Kaio; 48.79% to save	Kaio; 51.83% to win
Survived	Bruno; 46.72% to save	Anahí; 50.91% to save	Hadad; 50.82% to save	Kaio; 38.84% to save	Hadad; 40.60% to save	Kaio; 39.43% to save	Hadad; 44.25% to save	Will; 52.32% to save	Kaio; 46.02% to save	Kaio; 57.79% to save	Will; 37.94% to save	Will; 40.45% to save	Kaio; 48.79% to save	Kaio; 51.83% to win

==== Notes ====
- ^Note 1: On day 21, Fellipe won immunity for the nominations on week 3 through a special dynamic.
- ^Note 2: As this week's Mansion Owners, Baronesa and Will had to nominate one contestant for eviction in consensus, but couldn't agree on who to nominate. Because of this, Baronesa and Will were automatically nominated for the eviction. As result, the week's Secret vote to nominate one of the Mansion Owners was cancelled.
- ^Note 3: On day 27, Vinigram had the power to choose another contestant to receive immunity for the Mansion vote of the week through a special dynamic. He chose Liziane.
- ^Note 4: Anahí and Guipa were tied with four votes each. Hadad, as this week's immune Mansion Owner, had the casting vote and chose Anahí to be the third nominee.
- ^Note 5: On day 34, Bruno had the power to cancel the votes of two contestants on the Mansion vote of the week through a special dynamic. He canceled the Brenno's vote on Kaio and Guipa's vote on Will.
- ^Note 6: On day 41, Kaio won immunity for the Mansion Owners of the week's nomination through a special dynamic. However, he were still eligible to be nominated by the Mansion vote.
- ^Note 7: As this week's Mansion Owners, Edlaine and Liziane had to nominate one contestant for eviction in consensus, but couldn't agree on who to nominate. Because of this, Edlaine and Liziane were automatically nominated for the eviction. As result, the week's Secret vote to nominate one of the Mansion Owners was cancelled.
- ^Note 8: On day 48, Liziane had the power to pass all the votes that any contestant received to another contestant through a special dynamic. She chose to pass all two votes received by Fellipe (from Guipa and Hadad) to Will, increasing him nominations total to two.
- ^Note 9: On day 55, Fernando had the power to cancel the votes of two contestants on the Mansion vote of the week, who would have to revote in another contestant, through a special dynamic. Hideo's vote went from Hadad to Lucas and Geni's vote went from Brenno to Liziane.
- ^Note 10: On day 62, Taty won immunity for the Mansion vote of the week and was banned from this vote through a special dynamic.
- ^Note 11: On day 64, Hideo won immunity for the nominations on week 9 through a special challenge.
- ^Note 12: Guipa and Will were tied with four votes each. Kaio, as this week's immune Mansion Owner, had the casting vote and chose Guipa to be the third nominee.
- ^Note 13: On day 69, Taty had the power cast her Face-to-Face vote in week's Secret vote to nominate one of the Mansion Owners. She chose to vote on Liziane.
- ^Note 14: On day 74, due to a production error during the Safety challenge who wrongly gave Will the win, the opening of the public vote was delayed until the morning of day 75. As result, the challenge was canceled, where Hadad was saved from eviction and was replaced by the original nominee Will.
- ^Note 15: On day 76, Fellipe had the power to choose two contestants to vote again on the Mansion vote of the week through a special dynamic. He chose Hideo and Taty, who voted in Liziane for the second time.
- ^Note 16: As the third nominee, Liziane had to start the Save Chain in order to determine the fourth nominee. She saved Brenno, who saved Hadad, who saved Fernando, who saved Cel, who saved Hideo, who saved Taty, who saved Will, leaving Kaio as the fourth nominee.
- ^Note 17: This week featured four nominees and a double eviction. Geni, as the contestant who received the fewest votes from the public, was immediately evicted on day 81, while the three who survived the vote competed in the Safety challenge. Fellipe was the winner and chose Fernando as a replacement, thus determining who would face the second public vote on day 82.
- ^Note 18: On day 83, Fellipe was removed from the game due to military prosecution after breaching military obligations.
- ^Note 19: As the third nominee, Brenno had to start the Save Chain in order to determine the fourth nominee. He saved Will, who saved Kaio, who saved Hideo, who saved Fernando, leaving Guipa as the fourth nominee.
- ^Note 20: On day 85, the final eight contestants were automatically nominated for eviction in order to determine the finalists in two consecutive double evictions. Kaio and Will, as the winning duo of the final challenge, had the power to choose who would face the public vote with them. Having been selected to be part of the first vote, Will chose Guipa first, so Kaio chose Fernando to face the second public vote with him. Will chose Hadad to join him, while Kaio went with Hideo. Will made the final choice and nominated Cel, sending Taty to be nominated alongside Fernando, Hideo and Kaio.
- ^Note 21: For the final, the public votes for the contestant they want to win A Grande Conquista 2.

== Ratings and reception ==
=== Brazilian ratings ===
All numbers are in points and provided by Kantar Ibope Media.

Week	First air date	Last air date	Timeslot (BRT)	Daily SP viewers (in points)							SP viewers (in points)	BR viewers (in points)	Ref.
Week	First air date	Last air date	Timeslot (BRT)	Mon	Tue	Wed	Thu	Fri	Sat	Sun	SP viewers (in points)	BR viewers (in points)	Ref.
1	April 22, 2024	April 28, 2024	Monday to Saturday; 10:30 p.m. Sunday; 11:00 p.m.	4.5	4.8	3.8	4.1	4.6	3.1	4.0	4.1	Outside top 10	
2	April 29, 2024	May 5, 2024	Monday to Saturday; 10:30 p.m. Sunday; 11:00 p.m.	3.9	4.2	3.8	3.8	4.5	2.8	4.4	3.9	Outside top 10	
3	May 6, 2024	May 12, 2024	Monday to Saturday; 10:30 p.m. Sunday; 11:00 p.m.	3.7	4.1	4.1	3.9	3.7	2.9	4.0	3.8	Outside top 10	
4	May 13, 2024	May 19, 2024	Monday to Saturday; 10:30 p.m. Sunday; 11:00 p.m.	3.6	3.4	4.2	3.6	4.4	3.4	3.2	3.6	Outside top 10	
5	May 20, 2024	May 26, 2024	Monday to Saturday; 10:30 p.m. Sunday; 11:00 p.m.	3.5	4.5	3.5	3.6	3.3	3.5	3.3	3.6	Outside top 10	
6	May 27, 2024	June 2, 2024	Monday to Saturday; 10:30 p.m. Sunday; 11:00 p.m.	3.4	3.4	4.0	3.0	3.3	3.1	3.1	3.3	Outside top 10	
7	June 3, 2024	June 9, 2024	Monday to Saturday; 10:30 p.m. Sunday; 11:00 p.m.	3.3	3.4	3.9	3.1	3.7	2.7	3.7	3.4	Outside top 10	
8	June 10, 2024	June 16, 2024	Monday to Saturday; 10:30 p.m. Sunday; 11:00 p.m.	3.2	3.6	3.3	4.1	4.5	2.8	3.6	3.5	Outside top 10	
9	June 17, 2024	June 23, 2024	Monday to Saturday; 10:30 p.m. Sunday; 11:00 p.m.	3.6	4.0	4.0	4.4	4.4	3.1	3.4	3.8	Outside top 10	
10	June 24, 2024	June 30, 2024	Monday to Saturday; 10:30 p.m. Sunday; 11:00 p.m.	3.8	3.9	4.6	4.0	3.6	2.9	3.8	3.8	Outside top 10	
11	July 1, 2024	July 7, 2024	Monday to Saturday; 10:30 p.m. Sunday; 11:00 p.m.	3.5	3.1	4.7	4.8	4.5	3.0	3.9	3.9	Outside top 10	
12	July 8, 2024	July 14, 2024	Monday to Saturday; 10:30 p.m. Sunday; 11:00 p.m.	3.5	3.7	4.8	4.8	4.1	4.1	4.7	4.2	Outside top 10	
13	July 15, 2024	July 18, 2024	Monday to Saturday; 10:30 p.m. Sunday; 11:00 p.m.	3.7	4.3	3.8	4.6	—	—	—	4.1	Outside top 10	

- In 2024, each point represents 253.273 households in 15 market cities in Brazil (73.279 households in São Paulo).
