= Ilhados com a Sogra season 1 =

Ilhados com a Sogra
- Season 1
- Presented by: Fernanda Souza
- Location: Ubatuba, São Paulo
- No. of episodes: 8

Release
- Original network: Netflix
- Original release: October 9 – October 16, 2023

Season chronology
- Next → Season 2

The first season of Ilhados com a Sogra, also known as Stranded with my Mother-in-Law, premiered on Netflix on October 9, 2023, as part of a two-week event.

== Production ==
=== Filming ===
Filming for the first season took place at Caçandoca Beach, located 35 kilometers from the center of Ubatuba, São Paulo.

=== Release ===
The trailer for the season was released on September 13, 2023. With the trailer, it was announced that the season would be released on a two-week schedule: the first four episodes were released on October 9, 2023, while the final four on October 16.

== Contestants ==
Family	Mother-in-Law	Couple	Result
Nery	Eliane "Taninha" Nery	Francine Nery (daughter); Rodrigo Nery (son-in-law)	Winners
Sassone	Socorro Sassone	Vinicius Sassone (son); Felipe Sassone (son-in-law)	Runner-up
Tenório	Severina Tenório	Mayara Tenório (daughter); Thy Cesar (son-in-law)	Third place
Castro	Rogéria Castro	Rodrigo Castro (son); Thais Castro (daughter-in-law)	Eliminated
Dunker	Márcia Regina Dunker	Thiago Dunker (son); Silvia Dunker (daughter-in-law)	Eliminated
Donatti	Cristina Borba	Antonio Donatti (son); Ana Tonolli (daughter-in-law)	Withdrew

=== Future appearances ===
In 2024, Vinicius Sassone appeared on A Grande Conquista 2. However, he did not receive enough public votes to enter the game and was evicted on Day 5, finishing in 95th place.

== The game ==
=== Point progress ===
Family	Episodes						
Family	1/2	3/4	4/5	6/7	7	7/8	8
Nery	4	10	~~14~~; 16	21	21	IMM	WINNERS
Sassone	5	7	10	16	19	WIN	RUNNER-UP
Tenório	2	6	11	~~14~~; ~~11~~; 9	21	IMM	THIRD PLACE
Castro	3	8	~~14~~; 12	16	20	ELIM	
Dunker	5	9	11	13	18	ELIM	
Donatti	0	~~1~~; 0	WDR				

Key
Winner
Runner-up
Third place
Advanced
Immune
Eliminated
Withdrew

=== Lodging status ===
Family	Episodes					
Family	1/2	3/4	4/5	6	7	8
Nery	Basic	VIP	Basic	Basic	Rustic	Basic
Sassone	VIP	Rustic	Rustic	VIP	Rustic	Rustic
Tenório	Rustic	Basic	Basic	Rustic	VIP	VIP
Castro	Basic	VIP	VIP	Basic	Basic	
Dunker	VIP	Basic	Rustic	Rustic	Basic	
Donatti	Rustic	Rustic				

== Episodes ==
No. overall	No. in season	Title	Original release date
Week 1
1	1	"Desert Island Companion"	October 9, 2023
2	2	"Airing the Dirty Laundry"	October 9, 2023
3	3	"Mother-in-Law's Tongue"	October 9, 2023
4	4	"SOS – Every Man for Himself"	October 9, 2023
Week 2
5	5	"Coming Home"	October 16, 2023
6	6	"Queen of the Memes"	October 16, 2023
7	7	"Deal With It!"	October 16, 2023
8	8	"Mothers-in-Law's Secret"	October 16, 2023
