= Josemar Sobreiro =

Brazilian civil police, teacher and politician

Mayor of Paço do Lumiar
- In office January 1, 2013 – January 1, 2017

Personal details
- Born: Josemar Sobreiro de Oliveira; April 12, 1954 (age 72) Dom Pedro, MA
- Party: PSDB
- Spouse: Ivone Oliveira
- Occupation: Civil police
- Profession: Politician

Josemar Sobreiro de Oliveira (born April 12, 1954) is a Brazilian civil police, teacher and politician. In 2012 he was elected mayor of Paço do Lumiar for the term of 2013–2016, affiliated with the Liberal Party (PL). In September 2015 he changed his affiliation to the Brazilian Social Democracy Party. Sobreiro ran for reelection in 2016, but did not succeed.
