= Ilhados com a Sogra season 2 =

Ilhados com a Sogra
- Season 2
- Presented by: Fernanda Souza
- Location: Coruripe, Alagoas
- No. of episodes: 8

Release
- Original network: Netflix
- Original release: January 2 – January 9, 2025

Season chronology
- ← Previous; Season 1 Next → Season 3

The second season of Ilhados com a Sogra, also known as Stranded with my Mother-in-Law, premiered on Netflix on January 2, 2025, as part of a two-week event.

== Production ==
=== Filming ===
Filming for the second season took place at Pituba Beach, in Coruripe, on the southern coast of Alagoas, approximately 85–90km kilometers from the state's capital Maceió.

=== Release ===
The trailer for the season was released on December 12, 2024. With the trailer, it was announced that the season would be released on a two-week schedule: the first four episodes were released on January 2, 2025 and the final four on January 9.

== Contestants ==
Family	Mother-in-Law	Couple	Result
Kashiura	Celina Kashiura	Camila Kashiura (daughter); Miguel Filipe (son-in-law)	Winners
Araújo	Valdiceia Araújo	Andressa Araújo (daughter); Henrique Camargo (son-in-law)	Runner-up
Queiroz	Dora Queiroz	André Queiroz (son); Larissa Pereira (daughter-in-law)	Third place
Damasceno	Rose Damasceno	Mateus Damasceno (son); Jeu Damasceno (daughter-in-law)	Eliminated
Sousa	Yoná Sousa	Antony Marquez (son); Ana Paula Marquez (daughter-in-law)	Eliminated
Mendonça	Patrícia Mendonça	Raphael Mendonça (son); Isabella Vasques (daughter-in-law)	Withdrew

=== Future appearances ===
In 2025, Ana Paula and Antony Marquez appeared as a couple in Power Couple Brasil 7, where they were the sixth couple eliminated, finishing in 8th place.

In 2025, Yoná Sousa appeared in A Fazenda 17 where she was the seventh contestant to be evicted, finishing in 18th place.

== The game ==
=== Point progress ===
Family	Episodes					
Family	1/2	3/4	5/6	6/7	7/8	8
Kashiura	5	10	10	~~10~~; ~~7~~; 9	WIN	WINNERS
Araújo	5	9	9	~~9~~; ~~13~~; ~~15~~; 17	IMM	RUNNER-UP
Queiroz	3	5	10	~~10~~; ~~13~~; 11	IMM	THIRD PLACE
Damasceno	5	8	11	~~11~~; 9	ELIM	
Sousa	4	5	8	8	ELIM	
Mendonça	3	3	WDR			

Key
Winner
Runner-up
Third place
Advanced
Immune
Eliminated
Withdrew

=== Lodging status ===
Family	Episodes				
Family	1/2	3/4	5/6	6/7	8
Kashiura	VIP	VIP	Rustic	Basic	Rustic
Araujo	VIP	VIP	Basic	VIP	VIP
Queiroz	Rustic	Basic	VIP	Basic	Basic
Damasceno	Basic	Basic	Rustic	Rustic	
Sousa	Rustic	Rustic	Basic	Rustic	
Mendonça	Basic	Rustic			

== Episodes ==
No. overall	No. in season	Title	Original release date
Week 1
9	1	"Caught Between my Mother-in-Law and The Deep Blue Sea"	January 2, 2025
10	2	"Swimming Against The Tide"	January 2, 2025
11	3	"Full Speed Ahead"	January 2, 2025
12	4	"Heart Divided"	January 2, 2025
Week 2
13	5	"Tough Nut to Crack"	January 9, 2025
14	6	"Sins of the Past"	January 9, 2025
15	7	"To The Rescue!"	January 9, 2025
16	8	"The Ties that Bind"	January 9, 2025
