= A Grande Conquista =

Brazilian reality television show

- Genre: Reality competition
- Directed by: Rodrigo Carelli
- Presented by: Rachel Sheherazade
- Country of origin: Brazil
- Original language: Portuguese
- No. of seasons: 2
- No. of episodes: 162

Production
- Production location: Itapecerica da Serra
- Camera setup: Multiple-camera
- Running time: 15–75 minutes

Original release
- Network: RecordTV
- Release: May 8, 2023 – July 18, 2024

A Grande Conquista (Note: (English: The Great Conquest)) was a Brazilian reality competition format originally created and aired by RecordTV and hosted by Rachel Sheherazade. The series premiered on Monday, May 8, 2023, at 10:30/9:30 p.m. (BRT/AMT) on RecordTV, following a special preview episode that aired on May 2.

Originally billed as the Super Reality, the show features famous celebrities and ordinary civilians living together in a Mansion isolated from the outside world, while competing in challenges to avoid being nominated and, subsequently, evicted by the public in order to win the grand prize of R$1.000.000.

== Season chronology ==
Season	Number of contestants	Number of weeks	Finalists							
Season	Number of contestants	Number of weeks	Winner	Vote	Runner-up	Vote	Third place	Vote	Fourth place	Vote
1	20	11	Thiago Servo	35.60% (out of 4)	Gabriel Roza	24.86% (out of 4)	Natália Deodato	21.59% (out of 4)	Gyselle Soares	17.95% (out of 4)
2	20	12	Kaio Perroni	51.83% (out of 4)	João Hadad	35.19% (out of 4)	Will Rambo	9.53% (out of 4)	Fernando Sampaio	3.45% (out of 4)

== Spin-offs ==
=== O Grande React ===
An online spin-off show titled O Grande React was initially hosted by Lucas Selfie and Jorginho SP, a character played by comedian Fausto Carvalho. The show, broadcast live on R7 after each episode, is also available on-demand via PlayPlus. It features interviews with the newly evicted's contestants, as well as special guests and exclusive content across platforms like YouTube. For season 2, Jorginho SP was replaced by Ju Nogueira, who co-hosted alongside Selfie.

== Ratings ==
Season	Timeslot (BRT)	Episodes	Premiered		Ended		TV season	SP viewers (in points)	Source
Season	Timeslot (BRT)	Episodes	Date	Viewers (in points)	Date	Viewers (in points)	TV season	SP viewers (in points)	Source
1	Mon–Sat 10:30 p.m. Sunday 11:00 p.m.	74	May 8, 2023	4.2	July 20, 2023	5.0	2023	4.22	
2	Mon–Sat 10:30 p.m. Sunday 11:00 p.m.	88	April 22, 2024	4.5	July 18, 2024	4.6	2024	3.76	

- Each point represents a specific number of households in São Paulo.
  - 2023: 76.953 households.
  - 2024: 73.279 households.
