= Domingos Dutra =

Brazilian politician

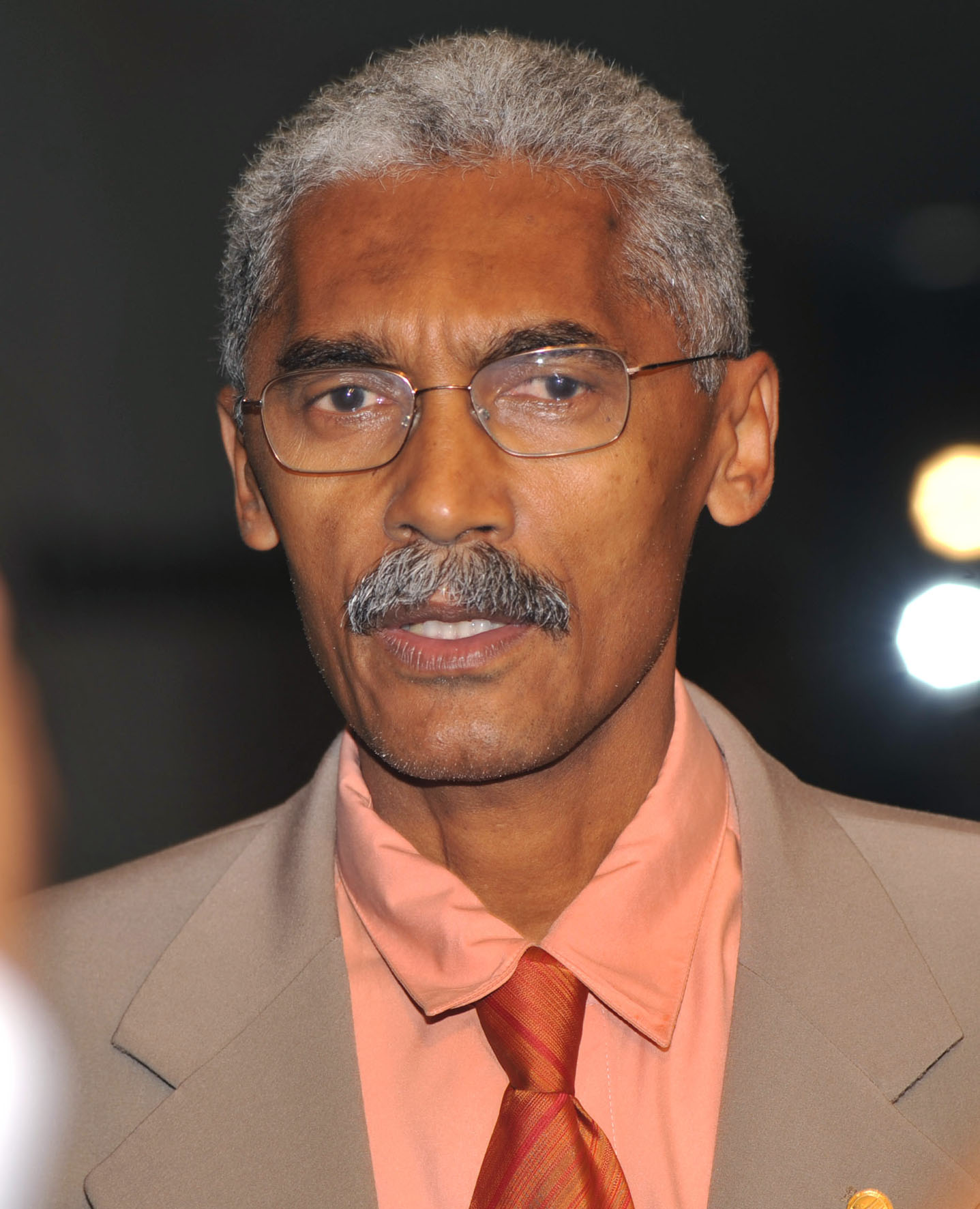
- Domingos Dutra in 2009

Mayor of Paço do Lumiar
- Incumbent
- Assumed office January 1, 2017
- Preceded by: Josemar Sobreiro

Federal Deputy from Maranhão
- In office February 1, 2007 – January 31, 2015
- In office February 1, 1995 – December 31, 1996

Vice-mayor of São Luís
- In office January 1, 1997 – December 31, 2000

State deputy from Maranhão
- In office February 1, 2003 – January 31, 2007
- In office February 1, 1991 – January 31, 1995

Personal details
- Born: Domingos Francisco Dutra Filho; March 20, 1956 (age 70) Buriti, MA
- Party: PCdoB
- Spouse: Núbia Dutra
- Profession: Politician

Domingos Francisco Dutra Filho (born March 20, 1956) is a Brazilian politician. He was state deputy (1991–1995, 2003–2007), vice-mayor (1997–2000) and federal deputy (1995–2003, 2007–2015). Dutra is a mayor of Paço do Lumiar since 2017.
