= Marco Feliciano =

Brazilian politician (born 1972)

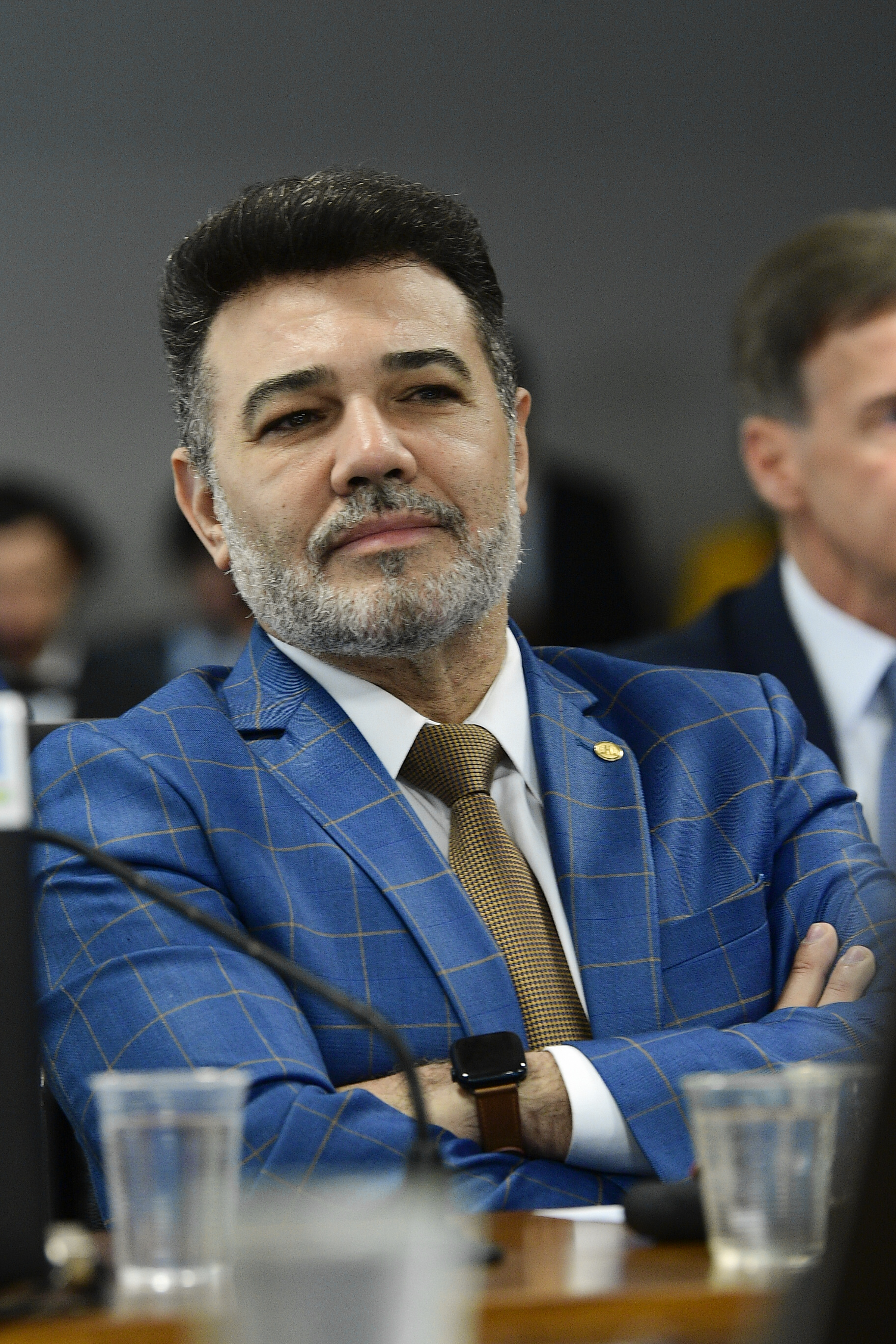
- Feliciano in June 2023

Member of the Chamber of Deputies
- Incumbent
- Assumed office 1 February 2011
- Constituency: São Paulo

Personal details
- Born: Marco Antônio Feliciano; 12 October 1972 (age 54) Orlândia, São Paulo, Brazil
- Party: PL (2021–present)
- Other political affiliations: PSC (2003–2011); PSD (2011–2012); PSC (2012–2018); PODE (2018–2020); Republicanos (2020–2021)

Religious life
- Religion: Christian
- Denomination: Neopentecostal
- Church: Assembly of God

Marco Antônio Feliciano (born 12 October 1972) is a Brazilian politician as well as a pastor, writer, film producer, and theologian. He has spent his political career representing São Paulo, having served as federal deputy representative since 2011. A polarizing figure in Brazilian politics due to his outspoken conservative views, his election to president of the commission on human rights and minorities caused controversy and protest due to Feliciano's comments regarding Africans, LGBTQ individuals, women, Catholics, among others.

== Personal life ==
Feliciano is the son of a single mother Lucia Maria Feliciano, and grew up in an impoverished environment. He is married to Edileusa de Castro Silva and has three children: Kamilly, Ketlin, and Karen. He is an alumnus of the International Seminary Hosanna and Bible School, located in Pompano Beach, Florida.

He is a pastor of the Catedral do Avivamento (Revival Cathedral), a neo-charismatic church affiliated with the Assembleias de Deus. Feliciano began preaching at the age of nineteen, but was not allowed to become pastor in the church of Assembly of God in Belém where he attended because he was too young. At the age of 26 he traveled to the United States and was ordained a pastor there under by the Gideões Missionários da Última Hora or GMUH, a sub-group of the Assembly of God in Brazil. Currently there are 14 churches under his leadership in Brazil.

In addition to being a pastor and theologian, Feliciano is also a writer with 18 published books, a performer of Christian music, and the producer of 2 evangelical documentaries.

== Political career ==
In the 2010 Brazilian general election Feliciano was elected to the federal Chamber of Deputies from his home state of São Paulo with 212,000 votes.

Feliciano voted in favor of the impeachment of then-president Dilma Rousseff. Feliciano voted in favor of 2015 tax reforms and the 2017 Brazilian labor reform, and would vote against a corruption investigation into Rousseff's successor Michel Temer. Feliciano was one of only 10 deputies who opposed the expulsion of then-president of the chamber of deputies Eduardo Cunha for corruption.

In July 2019 Feliciano announced that he would run as a vice-presidential candidate in the 2022 Brazilian general election.

A long time member of the Social Christian party, in March 2018 Feliciano joined the Podemos party.

== President of Commission on Human Rights and Minorities and controversy ==
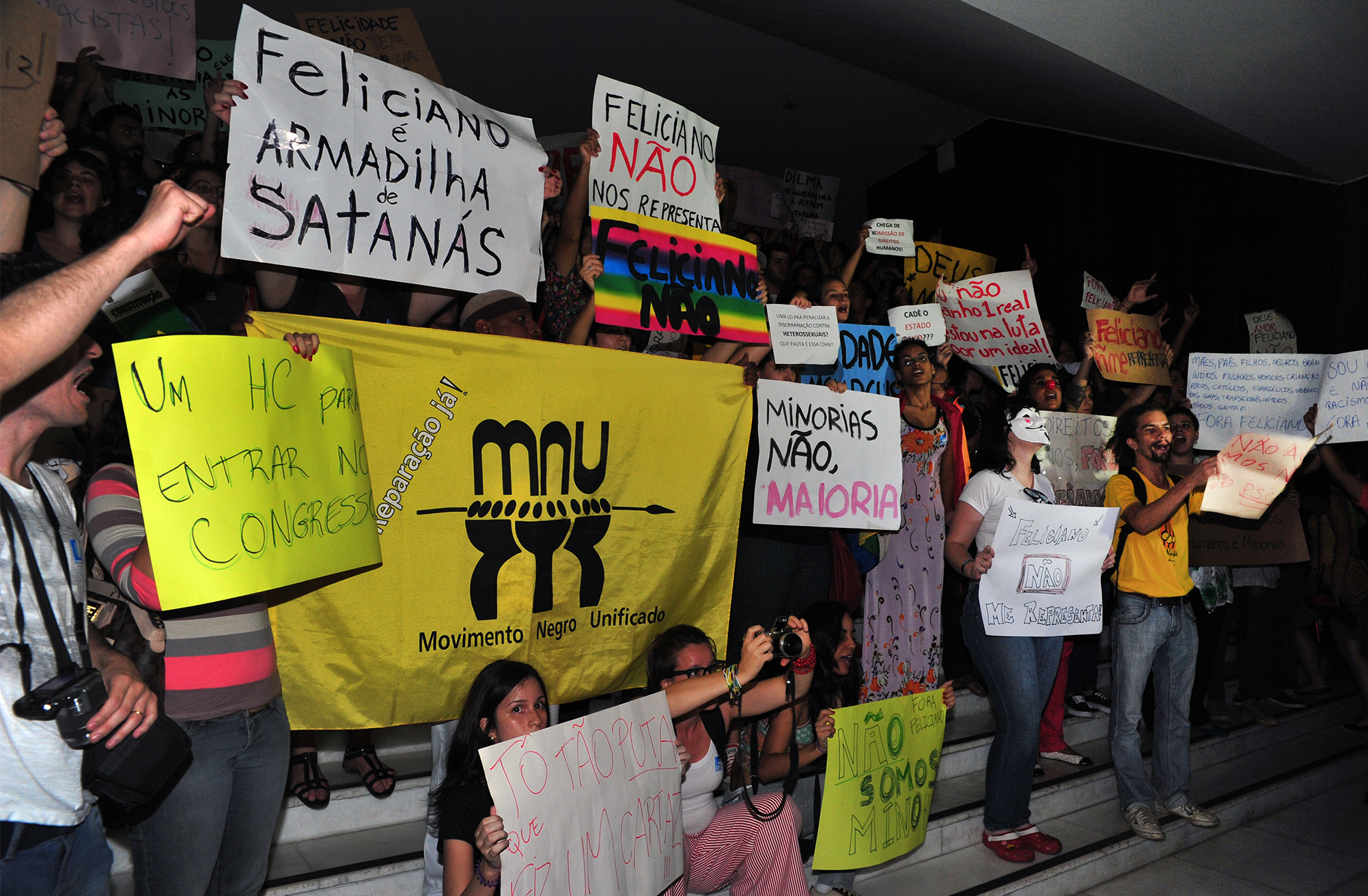
Protest against Feliciano in March 2015 in Brasília

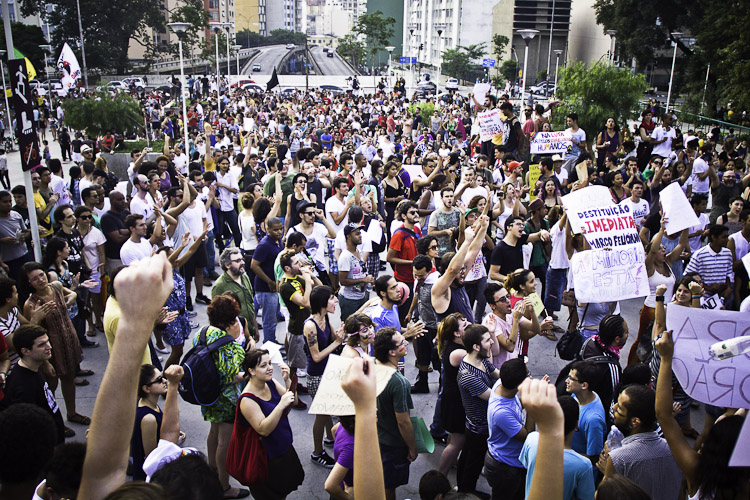
Protest against Feliciano in March 2015 in São Paulo

=== Preceding comments ===
In March 2011 on his Twitter account, Feliciano posted that "Africans are descendants from ancestors cursed by Noah." Feliciano later defended his statement with several passages from the book of Genesis which he said backed up what he had said. Roberlei Panasiewicz, a theologian at the Pontifical Catholic University of Minas Gerais, called Feliciano's statement fundamentalist and wrong. In an interview with Danilo Gentili on the television show Agora É Tarde on the channel Rede Bandeirantes, Feliciano defended himself against the accusations of racism saying "After being lynched, they are waking up. I am not racist, my mother is black and I did missionary work in Africa."

In one of his published books, Feliciano wrote on homosexuals "The rotten feelings of homosexuality leads to hatred, crime, and rejection. We love homosexuals, but we abhor their promiscuous practices." His statements were supported by then fellow federal deputy Jair Bolsonaro. Feliciano was investigated for hate speech for that comment, but was eventually cleared of any wrongdoing. In the closing statements the court said that Feliciano's comments were clearly homophobic and reprehensible, but as no law existed at the time to prosecute homophobia in Brazil, Feliciano could not be formally charged. In August 2013 there was controversy again as there were reports of LGBTQ activists being attacked after a campaign rally by Feliciano in Pará. In an interview for an upcoming book titled Religiões e política; uma análise da atuação dos parlamentares evangélicos sobre direitos das mulheres e LGBTs no Brasil Feliciano claimed that giving women more rights would undermine relationships and marriage, as well as increasing the likelihood that their children would be gay.

In a video posted on the website YouTube in April 2013, Feliciano preaching on an unknown date states in a sermon that Catholics worshiped Satan, and that the customs Catholics have of hanging crucifixs was idol worship which prostituted Jesus and other biblical figures. Feliciano also claimed that Catholicism encouraged homosexuality, saying that "My Jesus was not meant to be a homosexual neckpiece."

=== Nomination ===
In March 2013 Marco Feliciano was nominated by his party, the Social Christian Party of Brazil, to serve as the president of the commission on human rights and minorities. The parties leader and spokesperson Everaldo Pereira stated that Feliciano had always been committed to promoting and protecting family values, which extended to human rights according to Pereira.

After Feliciano was presented to the panel of federal deputies on 7 March 2013. After he was presented as the sole candidate for the ministry of human rights and minorities, several members including Domingos Dutra, Erika Kokay, Jean Wyllys, Luiz Couto, and Luiza Erundina boycotted the meeting in protest to his nomination. The meeting continued and Feliciano was elected by the remaining 12 members, 11 members voted in favor and one abstained.

=== Reactions and protests ===
Speaker of the house Henrique Eduardo Alves commented that "the situation of the Commission on Human Rights and Minorities has become unsustainable" and that the decision to appoint Feliciano was the wrong choice. Attorney general and chief prosecutor Roberto Gurgel also stated that Feliciano "is not suitable" to take the position due to his views and past comments. His nomination was also criticized by Britain-based human rights organization Amnesty International.

Reactions to Feliciano's appointment by right-wing politicians was mostly positive, pastor Silas Malafaia and then-federal deputy Jair Bolsonaro reacted enthusiastically to his appointment, and several pastors and elders of the Assembleias de Deus also voiced their support. Not all the reactions were favorable though, congresswoman Antonia Lúcia, herself an evangelical and member of the Social Christian Party, said she would resign from her post as vice chair of the commission due to Feliciano's comments.

Response by the Brazil's National Bishops' Conference, the main spokespiece for Brazil's Catholic bishops, was mixed. The conference described Feliciano's appointment as a setback for human rights in Brazil, however it also added that they agreed with Feliciano's views regarding abortion and same-sex-marriage.

Responding to the uproar and controversy resulting from his appointment, Feliciano claimed "This manifestation is all because, for the first time in the history of Brazil, a pastor filled with the holy spirit has conquered the space that until yesterday was dominated by Satan."

== Other controversies ==
=== Rape allegations ===
In 2016 Feliciano was charged with attempted rape and assault by 22-year-old Patricia Lelis, a PSC activist who attended the same church as the pastor. The deputy chief of staff, Talma Bauer, was arrested for initially being suspected of kidnapping the young woman and forcing her to record videos defending the deputy in order to dismiss the initial complaint. After a police inquiry, Bauer was released and the São Paulo Civil Police concluded that there was no kidnapping or aggression, and requested the arrest of Patrícia Lélis for the crimes of slanderous denunciation and extortion against Bauer.

=== Spending on dental treatment ===
Brazilian newspaper Estadão reported on August 3, 2019 that The Brazilian Chamber of Deputies reimbursed Deputy Pastor Marco Feliciano the quantity of R$157,000 ($40,000 USD) referring to a dental treatment. He argued that he needed to correct a jaw joint problem and reconstruct the smile with crowns and implants in his mouth. Feliciano said he suffered from chronic pain related to bruxism. "I don't wish for anyone," he said. “I am a politician and a preacher. My mouth is my tool." Brazilians have taken to social media to protest what they are calling the golden teeth of Marco Feliciano, and abuse of public money.

Chamber of Deputies (Brazil)
Preceded by Domingos Dutra	Chair of the Chamber Human Rights and Minorities Committee; 2013	Succeeded by Assis do Couto
Preceded by Margarida Salomão	Chair of the Chamber Urban Development Committee; 2019–21	Succeeded by José Priante
