= Joseval Peixoto =

Brazilian journalist and lawyer

- Peixoto in 2026.
- Born: September 26, 1938 (age 88); Rio de Janeiro, Brazil
- Occupations: Journalist, lawyer and radio presenter

Joseval Peixoto Guimarães, better known as Joseval Peixoto (born September 26, 1938), is a Brazilian journalist, lawyer and radio presenter.

== Early life and education ==
Born in the then capital of the Republic, at the age of two he returned with his family to the city of Rancharia, in the interior of São Paulo. Later, the family moved to the north of Paraná, settling in Arapongas. Joseval then went to study at a boarding school in Paraguaçu Paulista, where he finished high school.

== Career ==
He began his career as a broadcaster at Rádio Clube Marconi, in Paraguaçu Paulista. However, his interest in the profession of journalist occurred in Presidente Prudente, where he moved in 1955, in order to finish high school. There, he joined Rádio Presidente Prudente, where he read chronicles, was a radio actor, headliner for a spoken-word newspaper, presented auditorium programs, narrated mass, football, carnival. He was also a presenter on political platforms.

Hired as a sports announcer by Rádio Bandeirantes, in São Paulo, the opportunity arose to study law at the Faculty of Law of Largo de São Francisco (FD-USP) of the University of São Paulo (USP), where he graduated in 1965, having been the class speaker.

Peixoto did not start practicing law as soon as he left college, and planned to start a career as a lawyer when he had established himself on the radio and could impose a work contract. The consecration came in 1970, at the World Cup in Mexico. In 1974, after leaving Rádio Bandeirantes, he returned to Rádio Jovem Pan, where he debuted on the day of the World Cup final in Germany, narrating the São Paulo x Portuguesa game for the Brazilian Championship, being welcomed by Osmar Santos. In 1978 he narrated for Rádio Tupi. Two years later, he left sports broadcasting and switched to general journalism, taking over anchoring Jornal da Manhã. He also worked at TV Manchete and TV Cultura, where he presented the program Vox Populi.

Upon returning from Mexico, he looked for a law firm and was hired to work in the criminal area. He even held the position of prosecutor of the Military Justice of the State of São Paulo. A couple of years after starting to practice law, Joseval Peixoto set up his own law firm and dedicated himself to the jury for about ten years. At that time he interacted with great lawyers, such as Waldir Trocoso Peres, Raimundo Pascoal Barbosa and the former Minister of Justice Márcio Thomaz Bastos, among others.

He worked at one of the most important Brazilian radio stations, Jovem Pan, where he was one of the anchors of Jornal da Manhã. On August 14, 2018, Peixoto stopped being an anchor at Jornal da Manhã, starting to do only the newspaper's closing monologue, doing so until December 21, when he ended his time at the station. He also worked at SBT, where he debuted on May 30, 2011, as anchor of the new SBT Brasil, alongside Rachel Sheherazade. On October 9, 2017, SBT confirmed his departure from television news due to the termination of the contract after the channel's schedule underwent a reformulation.

On October 2, 2018, he was confirmed as a new hire at TV Gazeta as a commentator for Jornal da Gazeta. On November 7, he was one of those fired due to cuts in the broadcaster's journalism, but he continued at Gazeta, as he was responsible for the return of Desafio ao Galo, an amateur football tournament that the broadcaster showed in 2019. In February 2019, Joseval returns to narrate Desafio ao Galo, first shown on TV Gazeta where it remains until July. In September 2019, the tournament started to be shown on RBTV. In October 2019, the internet program Vamos Falar do Brasil (Let's Speak About Brazil) premiered, available on YouTube. On January 20, 2022, the program will be shown on TV Jovem Pan News.

Today, he has his own law firm, the office Joseval Peixoto e Advogados Associados.
