= Capitão Leônidas Marques =

Coordinates: 25.4789°S 53.6139°W

- Municipality
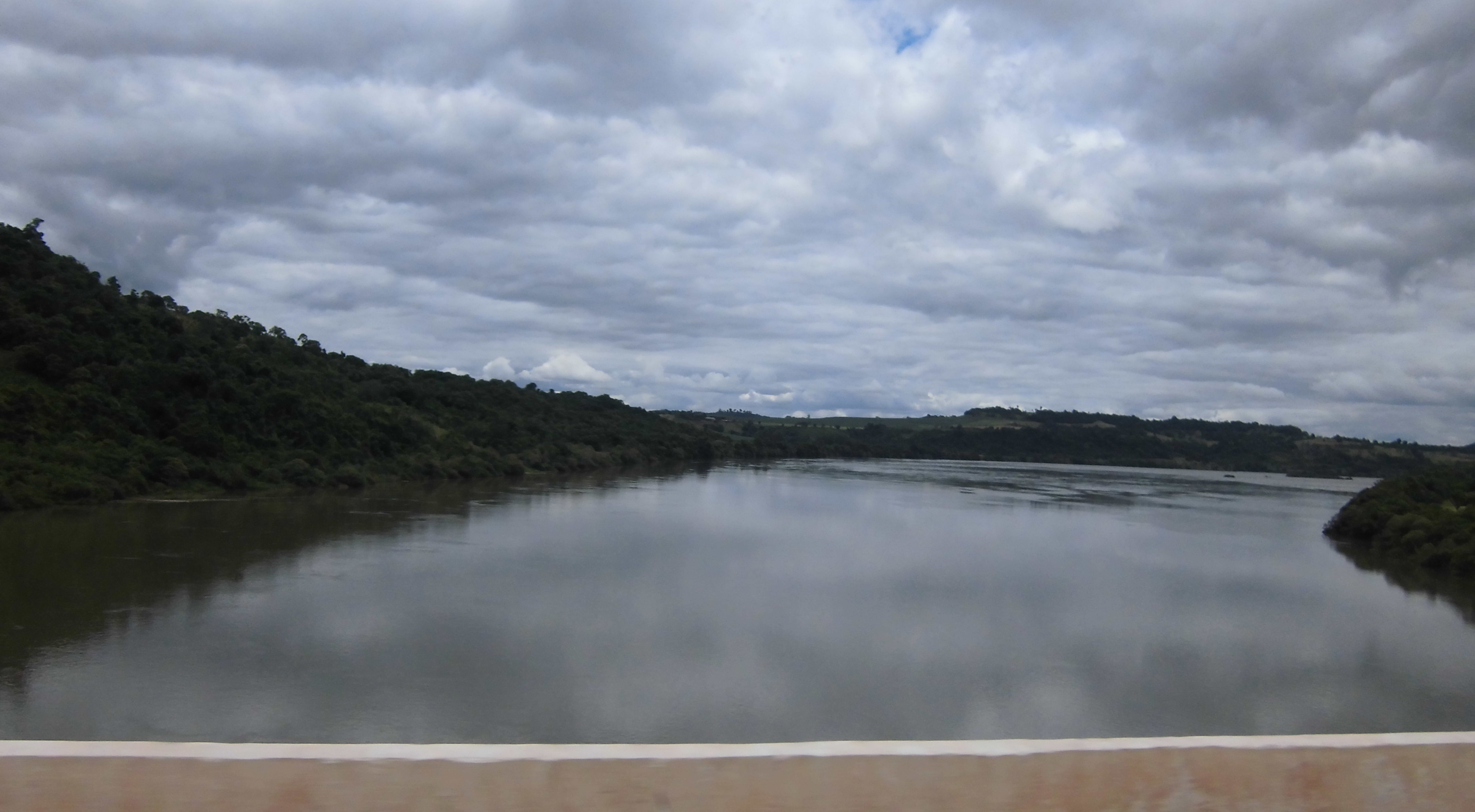

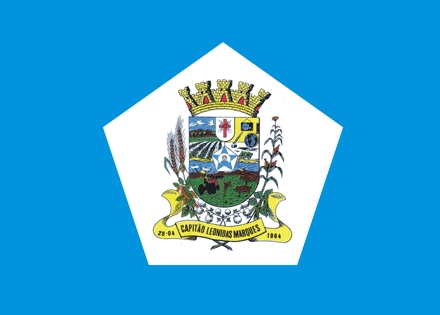
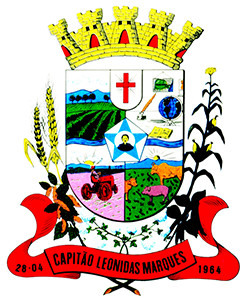
- Flag Coat of arms
- Interactive map of Capitão Leônidas Marques
- Country: Brazil
- Region: Southern
- State: Paraná
- Mesoregion: Oeste Paranaense

Population (2020)
  - Total: 15,834
- Time zone: UTC−3 (BRT)

Capitão Leônidas Marques is a municipality in the state of Paraná in the Southern Region of Brazil.

== See also ==
- List of municipalities in Paraná
