= Rachel Sheherazade =

Brazilian journalist (born 1973)

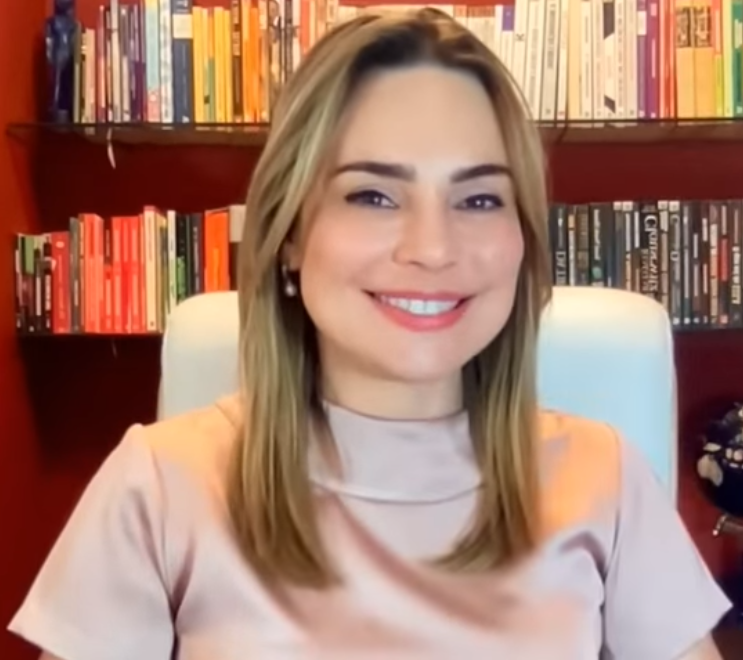
- Born: Rachel Sheherazade Barbosa; September 5, 1973 (age 52); João Pessoa, Paraíba, Brazil
- Occupation: Journalist

Rachel Sheherazade Barbosa (born 5 September 1973) is a Brazilian journalist.

== Education ==
Rachel Sheherazade has a degree in journalism from the Federal University of Paraíba (UFPB), Brazil.

== Career ==
Rachel Sheherazade began her career in television, working for Mail Paraibana, an affiliate of RecordTV, in the state of Paraíba. Several months later, she was invited to join Cabo Branco TV, a Paraíba affiliate of Globo TV. In 2003, she began presenting for Tambau News of Tambau TV, an affiliate of major national network Sistema Brasileiro de Televisão (SBT).

Sheherazade is known for her criticism on several topics, most notably regarding Brazil's anti-religious sentiment. In February 2011, while working at Tambau TV, she rebuked the carnival in Paraiba, saying that "Carnival is not a popular party, but a party for the elites".

She and Joseval Peixoto, another leading Brazilian journalist and lawyer, are co-presenters for major newscaster SBT Brasil, from Mondays to Fridays. Since 1994, Rachel Sheherazade has also been employed as a técnica judiciária (judicial technician) of Paraíba State Court of Justice.

== Controversies ==
On November 30, 2012, Sheherazade reacted to an attempt to have the motto "Deus seja louvado" ("God be praised") removed from banknotes of Brazil's currency, the real, by claiming that proponents of secularism and anti-religious groups were ungrateful to Christianity. She stated that Christianity was responsible for principles such as freedom, honesty, respect and justice, and that the action was "at least an ingratitude to the doctrine that inspired our culture, our values, and even our own Constitution promulgated under the protection of God". She went on to state her belief that "the next target of the secularizing tendencies" would be the Constitution of Brazil, with a view to removing its references to God, and added: "But a simple civil action will not suffice in that case, as they will have to amend the Constitution".

On March 20, 2013, Sheherazade stirred controversy on the internet when she defended pastor and congressman Marco Feliciano's freedom of expression and religion, stating that he had the right to express opinions and had been democratically elected.

On December 26, 2013, a message appeared in the Facebook profile of Paulo Ghiraldelli Jr., professor of philosophy at the Federal Rural University of Rio de Janeiro: "My wish for 2014: that Rachel Sherazedo be raped". The intentional misspelling of Sheherazade's surname contained a word play on the Portuguese term cheiro azedo (sour smell). Soon afterwards, a second, similar, message was posted. Sheherazade contacted the police and criminal charges were filed. Ghiraldelli Jr. denied the charges, claiming that his Facebook profile had been hacked, and deleted the messages of incitement to violence against the journalist. Ghiraldelli Jr. also denied being the author of other older posts critical of Sheherazade, found in his Twitter and Facebook profiles.

On February 4, 2014, Sheherazade commented on the action of a group of young men who had beaten a burglar and tied him by the neck to a pole with a bicycle lock, saying that the actions of vigilante groups were understandable, and that human rights protection served to defend criminals. The Union of Professional Journalists of the Municipality of Rio de Janeiro and its Ethics Committee issued a communique rejecting the journalist's statement, saying that it breached their code of ethics by inciting violence and crime, and showed contempt for human rights. Federal representative Jandira Feghali of the Communist Party of Brazil filed a complaint against Rachel Sheherazade Barbosa and SBT on the grounds that the statement constituted the "crime of apology and incitement to crime, torture and lynching, typified by Art. 287 of the Penal Code."

On April 5, 2014, news spread that Sheherazade was about to be fired, and supporters began protesting the decision. The rumor was later denied.
