= Paço do Lumiar =

- Municipality
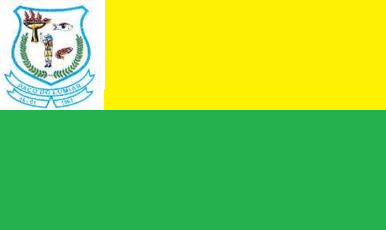
- Flag

- Location of Paço do Lumiar in Maranhao

- Location in Brazil
- Coordinates: 02°31′55″S 44°06′28″W
- Country: Brazil
- Region: Nordeste
- State: Maranhão
- Mesoregion: Norte Maranhense

Government
  - Mayor: Domingos Dutra

Area
  - Total: 51.124 sq mi (132.410 km^{2})

Population (2022 Census)
  - Total: 141,385
  - Estimate (2025): 155,307
  - Density: 2,765.54/sq mi (1,067.78/km^{2})
- Time zone: UTC−3 (BRT)

Paço do Lumiar is a municipality in the state of Maranhão in the Northeast region of Brazil.

The municipality contains part of the 1,535,310-hectare (3,793,800-acre) Upaon-Açu/Miritiba/Alto Preguiças Environmental Protection Area, created in 1992.

== See also ==
- List of municipalities in Maranhão
