= Power Couple (Brazilian TV series) season 7 =

Power Couple
- Season 7
- Hosted by: Felipe Andreoli; Rafa Brites
- No. of days: 75
- No. of contestants: 28 (14 couples)
- Winner: Radamés & Carol
- Runner-up: Dhomini & Adriana
- Companion show: Power Couple Live
- No. of episodes: 66

Release
- Original network: Record
- Original release: April 29 – July 10, 2025

Additional information
- Filming dates: April 27 – July 10, 2025

Season chronology
- ← Previous; Season 6

The seventh season of Power Couple premiered on Tuesday, April 29, 2025 at 10:30 p.m. on Record.

The show features fourteen celebrity couples living under one roof and facing extreme challenges that will test how well they really know each other. Each week, a couple will be eliminated until the last couple wins the grand prize.

On November 4, 2024, Record confirmed that the show would return for a seventh season after a three-year break. Felipe Andreoli and Rafa Brites were announced as the new hosts of the show on December 18, replacing Adriane Galisteu, thus making it the first season to be hosted by a couple. Lucas Selfie returned for his second season as the show's online host and correspondent.

Radamés Furlan & Carol Furlan won the competition with 54.24% of the public vote over Dhomini Ferreira & Adriana Leizer and Rayanne Morais & Victor Pecoraro and took home the R$446.000 prize they accumulated during the show. Dhomini & Adriana received a brand new car as the runners-up and Rayanne & Victor received R$50.000.

== Cast ==
The couples were officially revealed by Record on April 24, 2025. For the first time, a returning contestant is featured: singer Gretchen, who placed fifth in the inaugural season. This time, she competes alongside her new partner, her husband, Esdras de Souza.

=== Couples ===
Celebrity	Age	Hometown	Occupation	Partner	Age	Hometown	Occupation	Status
Diego Supérbi	31	São Paulo	Digital influencer	Giovanna Menezes	25	Atibaia	Digital influencer	Eliminated 1st on May 8, 2025
Eros Prado	40	São Paulo	Comedian	Gi Prado	37	São Paulo	Businesswoman	Eliminated 2nd on May 15, 2025
Francine Piaia	41	Rio Grande	Digital influencer	Júnior R.	35	Valinhos	Engineer	Eliminated 3rd on May 22, 2025
Gretchen	65	Rio de Janeiro	Singer	Esdras de Souza	52	Belém	Musician	Walked on May 23, 2025
Gui Seta	22	São Paulo	Actor	Bia Valente	20	Rio de Janeiro	Student	Eliminated 4th on May 29, 2025
Everton Neguinho	37	Barretos	TV host	Emilyn Marçal	23	Barretos	Model	Eliminated 5th on June 5, 2025
Ana Paula Marquez	30	Milton Brandão	Businesswoman	Antony Marquez	29	Teresina	Model	Eliminated 6th on June 12, 2025
Silvia Catra	47	Rio de Janeiro	Event producer	André Barcellos	52	Rio de Janeiro	Executive driver	Eliminated 7th on June 19, 2025
Kadu Moliterno	72	São Paulo	Actor	Cris Menezes	52	Florianópolis	Fitness influencer	Eliminated 8th on June 26, 2025
Eike Duarte	28	Rio de Janeiro	Actor	Natália Vivacqua	29	Recife	Digital influencer	Eliminated 9th on July 3, 2025
Rafael Pessina	40	Porto Alegre	Reporter	Talira Manñes	33	São Paulo	Producer	Eliminated 10th on July 9, 2025
Rayanne Morais	36	Jeceaba	Actress	Victor Pecoraro	47	São Caetano do Sul	Actor	Third place on July 10, 2025
Dhomini Ferreira	52	Goiânia	Businessman	Adriana Leizer	42	Goiânia	Real estate agent	Runner-up on July 10, 2025
Radamés Furlan	38	Rio de Janeiro	Football player	Carol Furlan	38	Santos	Judoka	Winners on July 10, 2025

== The game ==
Key

Men's challenge bet	Women's challenge bet	**T** Total money combined	Passed the challenge (adds the betting sum)	Failed the challenge (deducts the betting sum)	Won couples' challenge (immunity and adds R$20.000)

=== Challenges' results ===
		Week 1	Week 2	Week 3	Week 4	Week 5	Week 6	Week 7	Week 8	Week 9	Week 10		Week 11	
		Week 1	Week 2	Week 3	Week 4	Week 5	Week 6	Week 7	Week 8	Week 9	Week 10		Day 72	Finale
Sum of money		R$40.000	R$40.000	R$40.000	R$40.000	R$40.000	R$40.000	R$40.000	R$40.000	R$40.000	R$40.000	Auction		Jackpot
Bets
Radamés & Carol		R$003.000	R$022.000	R$030.000	R$000.000	R$010.000	R$010.000	R$005.000	R$030.000	R$018.000	R$021.000	R$020.000	—	R$446.000
Radamés & Carol		R$022.000	R$005.000	R$010.000	R$025.000	R$009.000	R$021.000	R$014.000	R$021.000	R$017.000	R$020.000	R$020.000	—	R$446.000
Radamés & Carol	T	R$015.000	R$067.000	R$020.000	R$065.000	R$016.000	R$009.000	R$059.000	R$111.000	R$005.000	R$079.000	R$000.000	Nominated	R$446.000
Dhomini & Adriana		R$010.000	R$019.000	R$021.000	R$013.000	R$015.000	R$002.000	R$026.000	R$029.000	R$021.000	R$025.000	R$024.000	—	R$500.000
Dhomini & Adriana		R$021.000	R$015.000	R$061.000	R$027.000	R$038.000	R$038.000	R$013.000	R$010.000	R$019.000	R$015.000	R$024.000	—	R$500.000
Dhomini & Adriana	T	R$009.000	R$074.000	R$122.000	R$026.000	R$083.000	R$000.000	R$027.000	R$079.000	R$000.000	R$080.000	R$000.000	Saved	R$500.000
Rayanne & Victor		R$005.000	R$010.000	R$020.000	R$035.000	R$028.000	R$009.000	R$040.000	R$010.000	R$020.000	R$042.000	R$081.000	—	R$731.000
Rayanne & Victor		R$020.000	R$013.000	R$015.000	R$005.000	R$015.000	R$039.000	R$021.000	R$030.000	R$020.000	R$038.000	R$081.000	—	R$731.000
Rayanne & Victor	T	R$015.000	R$037.000	R$065.000	R$080.000	R$083.000	R$090.000	R$111.000	R$020.000	R$100.000	R$130.000	R$000.000	Nominated	R$731.000
Pessina & Talira		R$001.000	R$020.000	R$010.000	R$040.000	R$007.000	R$020.000	R$008.000	R$012.000	R$039.000	R$046.000	R$091.000	—	R$400.000
Pessina & Talira		R$003.000	R$011.000	R$014.000	R$020.000	R$007.000	R$020.000	R$003.000	R$018.000	R$008.000	R$006.000	R$091.000	—	R$400.000
Pessina & Talira	T	R$036.000	R$071.000	R$064.000	R$120.000	R$040.000	R$000.000	R$055.000	R$034.000	R$071.000	R$000.000	R$091.000	Nominated	R$400.000
Eike & Natália		R$008.000	R$016.000	R$006.000	R$020.000	R$008.000	R$008.000	R$013.000	R$000.000	R$008.000	R$012.000	R$052.000		R$485.000
Eike & Natália		R$012.000	R$019.000	R$009.000	R$009.000	R$014.000	R$012.000	R$015.000	R$017.000	R$012.000	R$039.000	R$052.000		R$485.000
Eike & Natália	T	R$036.000	R$075.000	R$063.000	R$069.000	R$046.000	R$044.000	R$042.000	R$023.000	R$020.000	R$067.000	R$000.000		R$485.000
Kadu & Cris		R$006.000	R$008.000	R$008.000	R$007.000	R$006.000	R$001.000	R$003.000	R$031.000	R$030.000				R$415.000
Kadu & Cris		R$016.000	R$014.000	R$005.000	R$013.000	R$019.000	R$016.000	R$010.000	R$032.000	R$010.000				R$415.000
Kadu & Cris	T	R$050.000	R$046.000	R$037.000	R$034.000	R$053.000	R$055.000	R$037.000	R$103.000	R$000.000				R$415.000
Silvia & André		R$009.000	R$005.000	R$012.000	R$001.000	R$009.000	R$000.000	R$006.000	R$001.000					R$265.000
Silvia & André		R$010.000	R$009.000	R$028.000	R$037.000	R$027.000	R$015.000	R$004.000	R$020.000					R$265.000
Silvia & André	T	R$021.000	R$044.000	R$056.000	R$002.000	R$058.000	R$025.000	R$038.000	R$021.000					R$265.000
Ana Paula & Antony		R$011.000	—	R$011.000	R$022.000	R$013.000	R$015.000	R$017.000						R$227.000
Ana Paula & Antony		R$018.000	—	R$003.000	R$011.000	R$001.000	R$010.000	R$020.000						R$227.000
Ana Paula & Antony	T	R$011.000	Nominated	R$026.000	R$051.000	R$031.000	R$065.000	R$043.000						R$227.000
Everton & Emilyn		R$004.000	R$015.000	R$016.000	R$027.000	R$001.000	R$045.000							R$196.000
Everton & Emilyn		R$015.000	R$017.000	R$012.000	R$003.000	R$039.000	R$008.000							R$196.000
Everton & Emilyn	T	R$021.000	R$072.000	R$036.000	R$064.000	R$000.000	R$003.000							R$196.000
Gui & Bia		R$013.000	R$017.000	R$007.000	R$025.000	R$017.000								R$244.000
Gui & Bia		R$007.000	R$010.000	R$008.000	R$008.000	R$010.000								R$244.000
Gui & Bia	T	R$046.000	R$067.000	R$041.000	R$057.000	R$033.000								R$244.000
Gretchen & Esdras		R$002.000	R$007.000	R$009.000	R$030.000									R$167.000
Gretchen & Esdras		R$011.000	R$002.000	R$000.000	R$010.000									R$167.000
Gretchen & Esdras	T	R$031.000	R$045.000	R$031.000	R$060.000									R$167.000
Francine & Júnior		R$007.000	R$003.000	R$022.000	R$021.000									R$139.000
Francine & Júnior		R$033.000	R$016.000	R$006.000	R$007.000									R$139.000
Francine & Júnior	T	R$020.000	R$041.000	R$024.000	R$054.000									R$139.000
Eros & Gi		R$015.000	R$006.000	R$015.000										R$096.000
Eros & Gi		R$025.000	R$018.000	R$007.000										R$096.000
Eros & Gi	T	R$050.000	R$028.000	R$018.000										R$096.000
Diego & Giovanna		R$012.000	R$021.000											R$029.000
Diego & Giovanna		R$026.000	R$008.000											R$029.000
Diego & Giovanna	T	R$002.000	R$027.000											R$029.000
Notes		1	2	3, 4	5	6, 7, 8	9, 10	11, 12	13	14, 15	16, 17, 18, 19		20	(none)
Least money (pre-challenge)		Francine; Júnior	Francine; Júnior	Eros; Gi	Silvia; André	Everton; Emilyn	Dhomini; Adriana	Dhomini; Adriana	Rayanne; Victor	Kadu; Cris	Pessina; Talira			
Couples' veto power (most money)		Eros; Gi	Eike; Natália	Dhomini; Adriana	Pessina; Talira	Rayanne; Victor	Rayanne; Victor	Rayanne; Victor	Kadu; Cris	Rayanne; Victor	Rayanne; Victor			
Vetoed from Couples' challenge		Gui; Bia	Silvia; André	Radamés; Carol	Eike; Natália	Everton; Emilyn	Dhomini; Adriana	Dhomini; Adriana	Dhomini; Adriana	Eike; Natália	Eike; Natália			
Couples' challenge winners		Francine; Júnior	Francine; Júnior	Eike; Natália	Pessina; Talira	Dhomini; Adriana	Rayanne; Victor	Pessina; Talira	Radamés; Carol	Rayanne; Victor	Radamés; Carol		Dhomini; Adriana	
Nominated (pre-Couple's vote)
Couples' challenge losers		Ana Paula; Antony	Kadu; Cris	Gretchen; Esdras	Francine; Júnior	Gui; Bia	Everton; Emilyn	Ana Paula; Antony	Kadu; Cris	Pessina; Talira			Pessina; Talira	
Couples' challenge losers		Ana Paula; Antony	Kadu; Cris	Gretchen; Esdras	Francine; Júnior	Gui; Bia	Everton; Emilyn	Ana Paula; Antony	Kadu; Cris	Pessina; Talira			Radamés; Carol	
Couples' challenge losers		Ana Paula; Antony	Kadu; Cris	Gretchen; Esdras	Francine; Júnior	Gui; Bia	Everton; Emilyn	Ana Paula; Antony	Kadu; Cris	Pessina; Talira			Rayanne; Victor	
Least money (post-challenge)		Diego; Giovanna	Diego; Giovanna	Eros; Gi	Silvia; André	Everton; Emilyn	Dhomini; Adriana	Dhomini; Adriana	Rayanne; Victor	Kadu; Cris	Radamés; Carol			

==== Notes ====
- **^Note 1** : Eros & Gi and Kadu & Cris were tied in first place at the end of the Men's and Women's challenges, each with R$50.000. According to the rules, the couple with the highest amount in their overall bank account would have to veto another couple from competing in the Couples' challenge. However, since both couples were also tied in their overall bank accounts, a random draw was used to determine who would make the decision. Eros & Gi were selected and chose to veto Gui & Bia from competing in the Couples' challenge. After the challenge, the tie remained, but since Eros & Gi finished ahead of Kadu & Cris in the Couples' challenge, they became this week's Power Couple.
- **^Note 2** : Ana Paula & Antony were already nominated for having received the fewest votes to save from the public vote in the previous week. As a result, they were vetoed from participating in all of this week's challenges.
- **^Note 3** : Rayanne & Victor lost R$10.000 in their remaining jackpot to bet in the Women's Challenge, due to the use of Diego & Giovanna's inheritance power after Week 2's elimination night.
- **^Note 4** : Gretchen & Esdras, Kadu & Cris and Silvia & André were tied in last place at this week's Couples' challenge as both couples quit. Per the rules, since Gretchen & Esdras have the least money in their overall bank account, they were nominated.
- **^Note 5** : Eike & Natália had to bet their jackpot in the Men's Challenge, without seeing the explanation or details of the challenge, due to the use of Eros & Gi's inheritance power after Week 3's elimination night. They chose to bet R$20.000 on the Men's Challenge.
- **^Note 6** : Ana Paula & Antony won R$5.000 in their remaining jackpot to bet in the Men's Challenge and had to choose a couple to lose R$5.000 in the remaining jackpot, due to the use of Francine & Júnior's inheritance power after Week 4's elimination night. They chose Radamés & Carol, which lost R$5.000 in their remaining jackpot to bet in the Men's Challenge.
- **^Note 7** : Everton & Emilyn, as couple with the least money combined were automatically nominated, as they couldn't compete in the Couples' challenge due to being chosen by Rayanne & Victor at the end of the Men & Women's challenges.
- **^Note 8** : Dhomini & Adriana won the Couples' challenge which added R$20.000 in their total money this cycle, resulting them tied in first place with Rayanne & Victor with R$83.000 each. However, per the rules, since Dhomini & Adriana have the most money in their overall bank account, they became this week's Power Couple.
- **^Note 9** : Pessina & Talira had to bet all their remaining jackpot in the Men's Challenge, due to the use of Gui & Bia's inheritance power after Week 5's elimination night.
- **^Note 10** : Dhomini & Adriana and Pessina & Talira were tied in last place in the money rank this week with R$0.000 each. Per the rules, since Dhomini & Adriana have the least money in their overall bank account, they were nominated, as couldn't compete in the Couples' challenge due to being chosen by Rayanne & Victor at the end of the Men & Women's challenges.
- **^Note 11** : Kadu & Cris' sum of money was reduced to R$30.000, and had to choose a couple to add R$10.000 in the sum of money, due to the use of Everton & Emilyn's inheritance power after Week 6's elimination night. They chose Rayanne & Victor, which their sum of money was increased to R$50.000.
- **^Note 12** : Dhomini & Adriana, as couple with the least money combined were automatically nominated, as they couldn't compete in the Couples' challenge due to being chosen by Rayanne & Victor at the end of the Men & Women's challenges.
- **^Note 13** : Eike & Natália had to choose the value of another couple's bet in the Men's Challenge, due to the use of Ana Paula & Antony's inheritance power after Week 7's elimination night. They chose the value of Kadu & Cris's bet on the Women's Challenge, which was R$32.000.
- **^Note 14** : Pessina & Talira could cancel their bet on the Men's Challenge if they wanted, due to the use of Silvia & André's inheritance power after Week 8's elimination night. They chose to bet R$39.000 on the Men's Challenge. As they won the Men's Challenge, they didn't could to cancel their bet on the challenge.
- **^Note 15** : Dhomini & Adriana and Kadu & Cris were tied in last place in the money rank this week with R$0.000 each. Per the rules, since Kadu & Cris have the least money in their overall bank account, they were nominated.
- **^Note 16** : Rayanne & Victor would win R$10.000 in their total money if they win the Men's Challenge, due to the use of Kadu & Cris's inheritance power after Week 9's elimination night. As they won the Men's Challenge, they added R$10.000 in their total money this cycle.
- **^Note 17** : At this week's Couples' challenge (which would award the winner R$40.000 instead of R$20.000) losing couple wouldn't be automatically nominated, while the challenge winner wouldn't win immunity of this week, being eligible to be nominated. Radamés & Carol won the challenge which added R$40.000 in their total money this cycle, followed by Pessina & Talira, Rayanne & Victor and Dhomini & Adriana.
- **^Note 18** : After this week's Sunday activity, the couples competed in an auction for this week's Special power, placing a bet from their overall bank account. The couple who had the highest bid would win the Special power. Only they will have the value of the bet deducted in their overall bank account. Pessina & Talira won the Special power this week at auction with the bet of R$91.000 from their overall bank account, followed by Rayanne & Victor (R$81.000), Eike & Natália (R$52.000), Dhomini & Adriana (R$24.000) and Radamés & Carol (R$20.000).
- **^Note 19** : Pessina & Talira were immune this week, after used their Special power on the Week 10's nomination ceremony. As they were also the couple with the least money this week, Eike & Natália, as the second-to-last couple in the money rank, would become the second nominees. However, since Eike & Natália were already nominated due to the use of Pessina & Talira's Special power, Radamés & Carol, who ended up since the third-to-last couple in the money rank, were nominated.
- **^Note 20** : No bets were made on this week. Instead, the final Couples' Challenge winner couple would be the first finalist of the season. Dhomini & Adriana won the challenge and became the first finalists of the season. Pessina & Talira, Radamés & Carol and Rayanne & Victor were automatically nominated for the final elimination of the season.

=== Special power ===
Each week, during the Sunday activity, one couple will acquire the two power spheres (green and pink), which will grant them the power to choose between two advantages in the game during the live nomination ceremony on Wednesday; their selected option is marked in bold.

Week	Couple	Advantages
2	Gretchen & Esdras	Choose three couples to have their votes nullified.; **Multiply the votes received by a couple by two**. →**Pessina & Talira**
3	Francine & Júnior	Give immunity to a couple.; **Trade a couple who is nominated by another couple who is not nominated**. →**Ana Paula & Antony for Radamés & Carol**
4	Kadu & Cris	Choose a couple who must nominate again.; **Bet a R$5.000 bonus to bet in the next cycle in one of the nominated couples to be eliminated**. →**Silvia & André**
5	Eike & Natália	Cancel two couples' votes who in turn must nominate a different couple.; **Nominate a fourth couple who in turn must save one of the three other nominated couples**. →**Pessina & Talira** (nominated); **Radamés & Carol** (saved)
6	Ana Paula & Antony	Give immunity to a couple, except yourselves.; **Choose a couple to receive the double votes**. →**Radamés & Carol**
7	Radamés & Carol	Trade a couple who is nominated by another couple who is not nominated.; **Choose three couples to have their votes nullified**. →**Ana Paula & Antony, Dhomini & Adriana and Eike & Natália**
8	Eike & Natália	Choose three couples who is not nominated to be the only ones eligible to become the third nominated couple.; **Transfer all the votes that any couple received to another couple**. →**Dhomini & Adriana** (3 votes canceled); **Silvia & André** (3 votes added)
9	Pessina & Talira	Cancel a couple's vote who in turn must nominate a different couple.; **Choose a couple who must nominate again**. →**Radamés & Carol**
10	Pessina & Talira	**An immunity at this cycle and nominate a first nominated couple**. →**Eike & Natália**

=== Voting history ===
	Week 1	Week 2	Week 3	Week 4	Week 5	Week 6	Week 7	Week 8	Week 9	Week 10	Week 11	
	Week 1	Week 2	Week 3	Week 4	Week 5	Week 6	Week 7	Week 8	Week 9	Week 10	Day 73	Finale
Power Couple	Eros; Gi	Eike; Natália	Dhomini; Adriana	Pessina; Talira	Dhomini; Adriana	Rayanne; Victor	Rayanne; Victor	Radamés; Carol	Rayanne; Victor	Rayanne; Victor	Dhomini; Adriana	(none)
Nominated (Challenge)	Ana Paula; Antony	~~Kadu~~; ~~Cris~~	Gretchen; Esdras	Francine; Júnior	Gui; Bia	Everton; Emilyn	Ana Paula; Antony	Kadu; Cris	Pessina; Talira	(none)	(none)	(none)
Nominated (Least money)	Diego; Giovanna	Diego; Giovanna	Eros; Gi	Silvia; André	Everton; Emilyn	Dhomini; Adriana	Dhomini; Adriana	Rayanne; Victor	Kadu; Cris	Radamés; Carol	(none)	(none)
Nominated (Couples' vote)	Pessina; Talira	Pessina; Talira	~~Ana Paula~~; ~~Antony~~	Radamés; Carol	~~Radamés~~; ~~Carol~~	Radamés; Carol	Eike; Natália	Silvia; André	Eike; Natália	Dhomini; Adriana	(none)	(none)
Nominated (Couples' vote)	Pessina; Talira	Pessina; Talira	Radamés; Carol	Radamés; Carol	Pessina; Talira	Radamés; Carol	Eike; Natália	Silvia; André	Eike; Natália	Dhomini; Adriana	(none)	(none)
Radamés & Carol	Eike; Natália	Eike; Natália	Ana Paula; Antony	Everton; Emilyn	Ana Paula; Antony	Ana Paula; Antony	Eike; Natália	~~Dhomini~~; ~~Adriana~~; Silvia; André	Eike; Natália; Eike; Natália	Dhomini; Adriana	Nominated	**Winners** (Day 75)
Dhomini & Adriana	Rayanne; Victor	Radamés; Carol	Radamés; Carol	Radamés; Carol	Radamés; Carol	Radamés; Carol ^{(×2)}	~~Radamés~~; ~~Carol~~	Pessina; Talira	Radamés; Carol	Rayanne; Victor	Exempt	**Runner-up** (Day 75)
Rayanne & Victor	Dhomini; Adriana	Everton; Emilyn	Ana Paula; Antony	Everton; Emilyn	Ana Paula; Antony	Ana Paula; Antony	Eike; Natália	~~Dhomini~~; ~~Adriana~~; Silvia; André	Eike; Natália	Dhomini; Adriana	Nominated	**Third place** (Day 75)
Pessina & Talira	Everton; Emilyn	Gretchen; Esdras	Ana Paula; Antony	Everton; Emilyn	Eike; Natália	Eike; Natália	Eike; Natália	Eike; Natália	Eike; Natália	Dhomini; Adriana	Nominated	Eliminated (Day 74)
Eike & Natália	Pessina; Talira	Silvia; André	Radamés; Carol	Radamés; Carol	Radamés; Carol	Radamés; Carol ^{(×2)}	~~Kadu~~; ~~Cris~~	Silvia; André	Radamés; Carol	Rayanne; Victor	Eliminated (Day 68)	
Kadu & Cris	Pessina; Talira	Silvia; André	Silvia; André	Everton; Emilyn	Silvia; André	Eike; Natália	Eike; Natália	~~Dhomini~~; ~~Adriana~~; Silvia; André	Dhomini; Adriana	Eliminated (Day 61)		
Silvia & André	Eike; Natália	Eike; Natália	Ana Paula; Antony	Ana Paula; Antony	Kadu; Cris	Ana Paula; Antony	Eike; Natália	Eike; Natália	Eliminated (Day 54)			
Ana Paula & Antony	Radamés; Carol	Radamés; Carol	Radamés; Carol	Rayanne; Victor	Radamés; Carol	Radamés; Carol ^{(×2)}	~~Kadu~~; ~~Cris~~	Eliminated (Day 47)				
Everton & Emilyn	Pessina; Talira	Pessina; Talira ^{(×2)}	Pessina; Talira	Rayanne; Victor	Kadu; Cris	Kadu; Cris	Eliminated (Day 40)					
Gui & Bia	Pessina; Talira	Pessina; Talira ^{(×2)}	Pessina; Talira	Radamés; Carol	Radamés; Carol	Eliminated (Day 33)						
Gretchen & Esdras	Pessina; Talira	Pessina; Talira ^{(×2)}	Pessina; Talira	Radamés; Carol	Walked (Day 27)							
Francine & Júnior	Pessina; Talira	Radamés; Carol	Radamés; Carol	Radamés; Carol	Eliminated (Day 26)							
Eros & Gi	Everton; Emilyn	Everton; Emilyn	Ana Paula; Antony	Eliminated (Day 19)								
Diego & Giovanna	Everton; Emilyn	Everton; Emilyn	Eliminated (Day 12)									
Notes	1	2, 3	4	(none)	5, 6	7	8	9	10	11	12	13
Walked	(none)				**Gretchen**; **Esdras**	(none)						
Sent to elimination	Ana Paula; Antony	Ana Paula; Antony	Eros; Gi	Francine; Júnior	Everton; Emilyn	Dhomini; Adriana	Ana Paula; Antony	Kadu; Cris	Eike; Natália	Dhomini; Adriana	Pessina; Talira	Dhomini; Adriana
Sent to elimination	Diego; Giovanna	Diego; Giovanna	Gretchen; Esdras	Radamés; Carol	Gui; Bia	Everton; Emilyn	Dhomini; Adriana	Rayanne; Victor	Kadu; Cris	Eike; Natália	Radamés; Carol	Radamés; Carol
Sent to elimination	Pessina; Talira	Pessina; Talira	Radamés; Carol	Silvia; André	Pessina; Talira	Radamés; Carol	Eike; Natália	Silvia; André	Pessina; Talira	Radamés; Carol	Rayanne; Victor	Rayanne; Victor
Eliminated	**Ana Paula**; **Antony**; 27.47% to save	**Diego**; **Giovanna**; 26.25% to save	**Eros**; **Gi**; 20.92% to save	**Francine**; **Júnior**; 25.09% to save	**Gui**; **Bia**; 21.64% to save	**Everton**; **Emilyn**; 18.16% to save	**Ana Paula**; **Antony**; 25.74% to save	**Silvia**; **André**; 31.74% to save	**Kadu**; **Cris**; 13.46% to save	**Eike**; **Natália**; 22.15% to save	**Pessina**; **Talira**; 11.54% to save	**Rayanne**; **Victor**; 3.92% to win
Eliminated	**Ana Paula**; **Antony**; 27.47% to save	**Diego**; **Giovanna**; 26.25% to save	**Eros**; **Gi**; 20.92% to save	**Francine**; **Júnior**; 25.09% to save	**Gui**; **Bia**; 21.64% to save	**Everton**; **Emilyn**; 18.16% to save	**Ana Paula**; **Antony**; 25.74% to save	**Silvia**; **André**; 31.74% to save	**Kadu**; **Cris**; 13.46% to save	**Eike**; **Natália**; 22.15% to save	**Pessina**; **Talira**; 11.54% to save	**Dhomini**; **Adriana**; 41.84% to win
Saved	**Diego**; **Giovanna**; 36.91% to save	**Pessina**; **Talira**; 30.11% to save	**Gretchen**; **Esdras**; 28.70% to save	**Silvia**; **André**; 31.38% to save	**Everton**; **Emilyn**; 24.60% to save	**Dhomini**; **Adriana**; 29.78% to save	**Eike**; **Natália**; 26.53% to save	**Rayanne**; **Victor**; 33.80% to save	**Pessina**; **Talira**; 36.32% to save	**Dhomini**; **Adriana**; 32.48% to save	**Rayanne**; **Victor**; 27.51% to save	**Radamés**; **Carol**; 54.24% to win
Saved	**Pessina**; **Talira**; 37.57% to save	**Ana Paula**; **Antony**; 43.64% to save	**Radamés**; **Carol**; 50.38% to save	**Radamés**; **Carol**; 43.53% to save	**Pessina**; **Talira**; 53.76% to save	**Radamés**; **Carol**; 52.06% to save	**Dhomini**; **Adriana**; 47.73% to save	**Kadu**; **Cris**; 34.46% to save	**Eike**; **Natália**; 50.22% to save	**Radamés**; **Carol**; 45.37% to save	**Radamés**; **Carol**; 60.95% to save	**Radamés**; **Carol**; 54.24% to win

==== Notes ====
- **^Note 1** : Week 1 was a non-elimination week. On elimination night, the three nominated couples faced a public vote to determine which of the three would be the first couple nominated for Week 2. Ana Paula & Antony have received the fewest votes to save, were permanently nominated and vetoed from participating in that week's challenges.
- **^Note 2** : After the Couples' vote, Gretchen & Esdras used their Special power to multiply by two all the votes received by Pessina & Talira, increasing their total to six and making them the fourth nominees.
- **^Note 3** : After the Couples' vote, Ana Paula & Antony, as this week's first nominated couple, had to save one couple from the elimination as there were four nominated couples instead of three. They chose to save Kadu & Cris.
- **^Note 4** : After the Couples' vote, Francine & Júnior used their Special power to directly save one of the three nominated couples and replaced them with another couple. They chose to save Ana Paula & Antony and replaced them with Radamés & Carol.
- **^Note 5** : On Day 27, Gretchen & Esdras walked from the competition following Week 4's elimination night results.
- **^Note 6** : After the Couples' vote, Eike & Natália used their Special power to directly nominated a couple, who in turn had to save one of the three other nominated couples. They chose Pessina & Talira as nominated, who in turn saved Radamés & Carol.
- **^Note 7** : Before the Couples' vote, Ana Paula & Antony used their Special power to choice a couple to have all the votes their received would be counted as two. They chose Radamés & Carol. As a result, their three nominations were doubled-up to six, thus making them the third nominees.
- **^Note 8** : After the couples' vote, Radamés & Carol used their Special power to cancel Dhomini & Adriana's vote on Radamés & Carol as well as the votes Kadu & Cris received by Ana Paula & Antony and Eike & Natália, thus making Eike & Natália to be the third nominees.
- **^Note 9** : After the couples' vote, Eike & Natália used their special power to transfer three votes received by Dhomini & Adriana (from Kadu & Cris, Radamés & Carol and Rayanne & Victor) to Silvia & André, increasing their nominations total to four, thus making them the third nominees.
- **^Note 10** : After the couples' vote, Pessina & Talira used their Special power to make Radamés & Carol vote again. They voted in Eike & Natália for the second time.
- **^Note 11** : After the Couples' challenge's result, Pessina & Talira used their Special power won immunity for this week's nominations and to choice a couple to be the first nominee. They chose Eike & Natália to be the first nominees.
- **^Note 12** : On week 11, the final four couples competed in the final Couples' challenge for place in the final. Dhomini & Adriana were winners and became the first finalists of the season. Pessina & Talira, Radamés & Carol and Rayanne & Victor were automatically nominated for the final elimination of the season.
- **^Note 13** : For the final, the public votes for the couple they want to win Power Couple Brasil 7.

=== Inheritance power ===
Since season five, each eliminated couple is entitled to an 'inheritance'. They must delegate which couple will face a consequence — either good or bad — in the upcoming cycle. The specific consequence is chosen by the public through the show's profile on R7.com, from two given options.

Week	Eliminated Couple	Consequences
2	Diego & Giovanna	**1** This couple lost a R$10.000 bonus to bet in the second challenge of the cycle. →**Rayanne & Victor**
3	Eros & Gi	**1** This couple has to bet their money in the "dark" on the second challenge, without seeing the explanation or details of the challenge. →**Eike & Natália**
4	Francine & Júnior	**1** This couple earned a R$5.000 bonus to bet in the second challenge of the cycle and must choose another couple to lose a R$5.000 bonus to bet in the second challenge of the cycle. →**Ana Paula & Antony**
5	Gui & Bia	**1** This couple has to bet all their money in the second challenge of the cycle. →**Pessina & Talira**
6	Everton & Emilyn	**1** This couple lost a R$10.000 bonus to bet in the first challenge of the cycle and must choose another couple to add a R$10.000 bonus to bet in the first challenge of the cycle. →**Kadu & Cris**
7	Ana Paula & Antony	**1** This couple must choose the value of another couple's bet in the first challenge of the cycle. →**Eike & Natália**
8	Silvia & André	**1** This couple can cancel the bet on the first challenge of the cycle, if they wish. →**Pessina & Talira**
9	Kadu & Cris	**1** This couple would win a R$10.000 bonus in this cycle, if they win the second challenge of the cycle. →**Rayanne & Victor**

=== Room status ===
	Week 1	Week 2	Week 3	Week 4	Week 5	Week 6	Week 7	Week 8	Week 9	Week 10	Week 11	
	Week 1	Week 2	Week 3	Week 4	Week 5	Week 6	Week 7	Week 8	Week 9	Week 10	Day 69	Finale
**Pomegranate** **(Power suite)**	Diego; Giovanna	Eros; Gi	Eike; Natália	Dhomini; Adriana	Pessina; Talira	Dhomini; Adriana	Rayanne; Victor	Rayanne; Victor	Radamés; Carol	Rayanne; Victor		
**Jabuticaba** **suite**	Eros; Gi	Gretchen; Esdras	Gretchen; Esdras	Gretchen; Esdras	Rayanne; Victor	Ana Paula; Antony	Kadu; Cris	Kadu; Cris	Kadu; Cris	Pessina; Talira	Rayanne; Victor	Rayanne; Victor
**Grape**	Dhomini; Adriana	Eike; Natália	Eros; Gi	Ana Paula; Antony	Ana Paula; Antony	Silvia; André	Pessina; Talira	Radamés; Carol	Eike; Natália	Dhomini; Adriana	Dhomini; Adriana	Dhomini; Adriana
**Pineapple**	Gui; Bia	Gui; Bia	Dhomini; Adriana	Eike; Natália	Dhomini; Adriana	Radamés; Carol	Ana Paula; Antony	Eike; Natália	Pessina; Talira	Eike; Natália	Radamés; Carol	Radamés; Carol
**Peach**	Silvia; André	Francine; Júnior	Francine; Júnior	Pessina; Talira	Gui; Bia	Pessina; Talira	Eike; Natália	Pessina; Talira	Rayanne; Victor	Radamés; Carol	Pessina; Talira	
**Cupuaçu** **suite**	Radamés; Carol	Radamés; Carol	Ana Paula; Antony	Everton; Emilyn	Kadu; Cris	Eike; Natália	Silvia; André	Silvia; André				
**Cocoa** **suite**	Kadu; Cris	Kadu; Cris	Kadu; Cris	Kadu; Cris	Silvia; André	Everton; Emilyn	Radamés; Carol					
**Watermelon**	Rayanne; Victor	Rayanne; Victor	Rayanne; Victor	Gui; Bia	Eike; Natália	Kadu; Cris						
**Kiwi** **suite**	Pessina; Talira	Dhomini; Adriana	Gui; Bia	Francine; Júnior	Radamés; Carol							
**Jackfruit** **(Squeeze)**	Gretchen; Esdras	Silvia; André	Everton; Emilyn	Rayanne; Victor	Everton; Emilyn	Rayanne; Victor	Dhomini; Adriana	Dhomini; Adriana	Dhomini; Adriana			
**Living room**	Ana Paula; Antony	Ana Paula; Antony	Pessina; Talira	Radamés; Carol								
**Living room**	Eike; Natália	Everton; Emilyn	Radamés; Carol	Silvia; André								
**Living room**	Francine; Júnior	Pessina; Talira	Silvia; André									
Tent	Everton; Emilyn	Diego; Giovanna										

== Ratings and reception ==
=== Brazilian ratings ===
All numbers are in points and provided by Kantar Ibope Media.

Semana	First air date	Last air date	Timeslot (BRT)	Daily SP viewers (in points)							SP viewers (in points)	BR viewers (in points)	Ref.
Semana	First air date	Last air date	Timeslot (BRT)	Mon	Tue	Wed	Thu	Fri	Sat	Sun	SP viewers (in points)	BR viewers (in points)	Ref.
1	April 29, 2025	May 4, 2025	Monday to Saturday; 10:30 p.m. Sunday; 02:00 p.m.	—	5.2	5.0	5.3	5.3	3.0	3.3	4.5	Outside top 10	
2	May 5, 2025	May 11, 2025	Monday to Saturday; 10:30 p.m. Sunday; 02:00 p.m.	4.2	4.7	5.4	4.6	4.4	3.0	2.7	4.1	Outside top 10	
3	May 12, 2025	May 18, 2025	Monday to Saturday; 10:30 p.m. Sunday; 02:00 p.m.	3.9	4.7	5.0	3.9	4.4	2.6	2.9	3.9	Outside top 10	
4	May 19, 2025	May 24, 2025	Monday to Saturday; 10:30 p.m. Sunday; 02:00 p.m.	4.0	4.5	4.4	5.0	5.4	2.8	—	4.3	Outside top 10	
5	May 26, 2025	May 31, 2025	Monday to Saturday; 10:30 p.m. Sunday; 02:00 p.m.	4.5	4.5	4.7	4.3	5.6	3.5	—	4.5	Outside top 10	
6	June 2, 2025	June 7, 2025	Monday to Saturday; 10:30 p.m. Sunday; 02:00 p.m.	4.7	4.8	4.9	4.3	5.0	3.5	—	4.5	Outside top 10	
7	June 9, 2025	June 14, 2025	Monday to Saturday; 10:30 p.m. Sunday; 02:00 p.m.	5.0	3.9	4.7	5.0	4.4	3.5	—	4.4	Outside top 10	
8	June 16, 2025	June 21, 2025	Monday to Saturday; 10:30 p.m. Sunday; 02:00 p.m.	4.7	5.0	4.5	4.2	4.9	3.0	—	4.3	Outside top 10	
9	June 23, 2025	June 28, 2025	Monday to Saturday; 10:30 p.m. Sunday; 02:00 p.m.	4.0	3.7	4.0	4.2	5.3	2.7	—	4.0	Outside top 10	
10	June 30, 2025	July 5, 2025	Monday to Saturday; 10:30 p.m. Sunday; 02:00 p.m.	4.0	4.5	4.5	4.8	3.7	3.1	—	4.1	Outside top 10	
11	July 7, 2025	July 10, 2025	Monday to Saturday; 10:30 p.m. Sunday; 02:00 p.m.	3.7	5.1	4.4	5.1	—	—	—	4.6	Outside top 10	

- In 2025, each point represents 270.631 households in 15 market cities in Brazil (77.488 households in São Paulo).
