= Dom Pedro, Maranhão =

Coordinates: 4°29′S 44°27′W

Dom Pedro
- Municipality
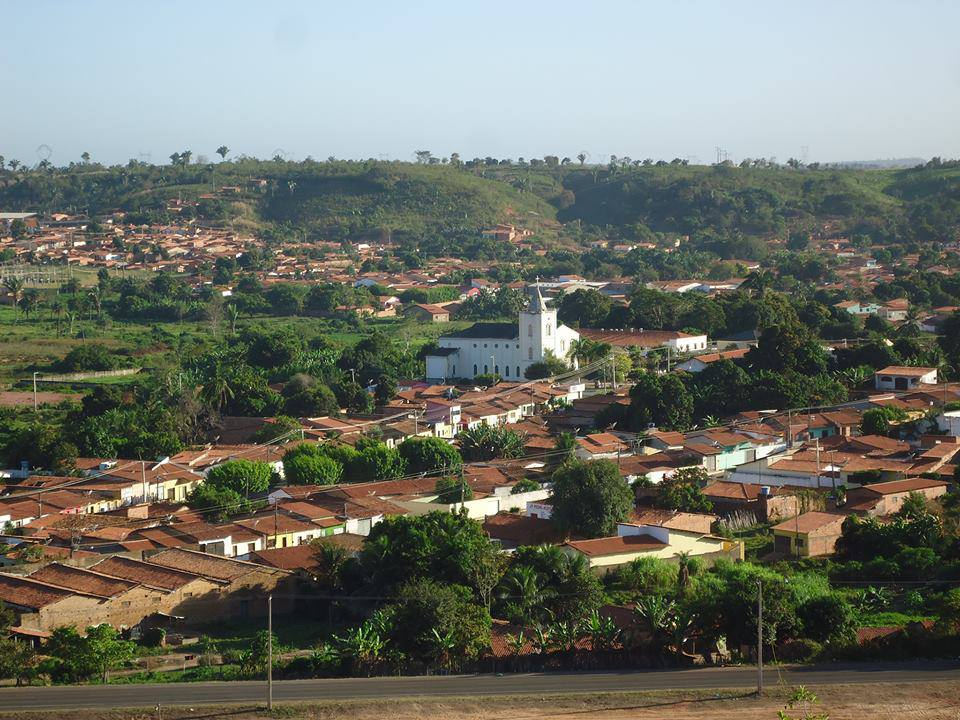
- View of Dom Pedro, Maranhão

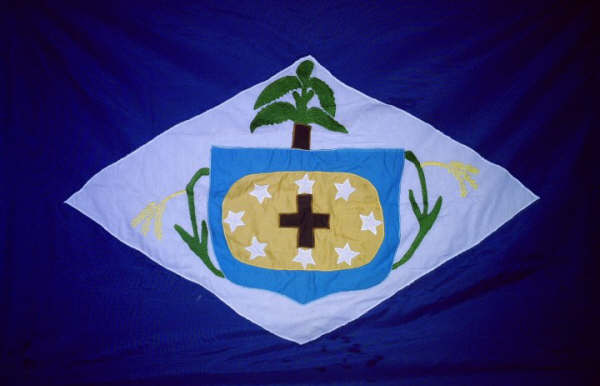
- Flag
- Interactive map of Dom Pedro
- Country: Brazil
- Region: Nordeste
- State: Maranhão
- Mesoregion: Centro Maranhense

Population (2020)
  - Total: 23,372
- Time zone: UTC−3 (BRT)

Dom Pedro is a municipality in the state of Maranhão in the Northeast region of Brazil.

== See also ==
- List of municipalities in Maranhão
