= Power Couple (Brazilian TV series) =

- Genre: Reality competition
- Created by: Dori Media
- Directed by: Rodrigo Carelli
- Presented by: Roberto Justus (2016–17); Gugu Liberato (2018–19); Adriane Galisteu (2021–22); Felipe Andreoli (2025–); Rafa Brites (2025–)
- Opening theme: "The Power of Love" by Huey Lewis and the News
- Composer: Bruno Faglioni
- Country of origin: Brazil
- Original language: Portuguese
- No. of seasons: 7
- No. of episodes: 345 (+1 special)

Production
- Production locations: São Paulo (2016–17); Itapecerica da Serra (2018–)
- Camera setup: Multiple-camera
- Running time: 15–90 minutes

Original release
- Network: Record
- Release: April 12, 2016

Power Couple, also known as Power Couple Brasil, is a Brazilian reality competition based on the Israeli television series זוג מנצח VIP. The series premiered on Tuesday, April 12, 2016 at 10:30 p.m. on Record.

The show features celebrity couples living under one roof and facing extreme challenges that will test how well they really know each other. Each week, a couple will be eliminated until the last couple wins the grand prize.

The first two seasons of the show were hosted by Roberto Justus. From seasons three to four, Gugu Liberato took over as host, with production moving from São Paulo to Itapecerica da Serra. From season five onwards, Adriane Galisteu replaced Gugu, following his death in late 2019, becoming the show's first female host. In season seven, Felipe Andreoli and Rafa Brites succeeded Galisteu, marking the show's first dual-hosting duo.

The fifth season, originally scheduled for 2020, was postponed to 2021 due to safety concerns arising from the COVID-19 pandemic. On December 24, 2022, production for season seven was canceled for both 2023 and 2024, with A Grande Conquista replacing the show during that period. However, on November 4, 2024, Record confirmed the show's return for 2025.

== Season chronology ==
Season	No. of couples	No. of weeks	Finalists						Prize fund	Host
Season	No. of couples	No. of weeks	Winners	Vote	Runner-up	Vote	Third place	Vote	Prize fund	Host
1	8	7	Laura Keller; Jorge Sousa	82.40% (out of 2)	Simony; Patrick Souza	17.60% (out of 2)	No third finalist.		R$697.000	Roberto Justus
2	11	10	Nayara Justino; Cairo Jardim	65.07% (out of 3)	MC Marcelly; Frank Cavalcante	22.75% (out of 3)	Fábio Villa Verde; Regiane Cesnique	12.18% (out of 3)	R$399.000	Roberto Justus
3	11	10	Tati Minerato; Marcelo Galatico	60.98% (out of 2)	Aritana Maroni; Paulo Rogério	39.02% (out of 2)	No third finalist.		R$303.000	Gugu Liberato
4	13	13	Nicole Bahls; Marcelo Bimbi	48.60% (out of 3)	Mariana Felício; Daniel Saullo	42.99% (out of 3)	Clara Maia; André Coelho	8.41% (out of 3)	R$596.000	Gugu Liberato
5	13	11	Matheus Yurley; Mari Matarazzo	63.41% (out of 2)	Déborah Albuquerque; Bruno Salomão	36.59% (out of 2)	No third finalist.		R$403.000	Adriane Galisteu
6	13	11	Brenda Paixão; Matheus Sampaio	53.88% (out of 3)	Mussunzinho; Karol Menezes	26.89% (out of 3)	Adryana Ribeiro; Albert Bressan	19.23% (out of 3)	R$330.000	Adriane Galisteu
7	14	11	Radamés Furlan; Carol Furlan	54.24% (out of 3)	Dhomini Ferreira; Adriana Leizer	41.84% (out of 3)	Rayanne Morais; Victor Pecoraro	3.92% (out of 3)	R$446.000	Felipe Andreoli; Rafa Brites
Special	5	1	Renata Alves; Diego Gonzaga	93.75% (out of 2)	MC Koringa; Manoela Alcantara	6.25% (out of 2)	No third finalist.		R$030.000	Adriane Galisteu

== Records ==
=== Highest number of rejections ===
#	Season	Week	Voting Results				Ref.
1	5	11 (Day 74)	Thiago Bertoldo; Geórgia Fröhlich; 4.59% to save	Déborah Albuquerque; Bruno Salomão; Most votes to save		Matheus Yurley; Mari Matarazzo; Most votes to save	
2	5	11 (Day 75)	Li Martins; JP Mantovani †; 5.44% to save	Déborah Albuquerque; Bruno Salomão; Most votes to save		Matheus Yurley; Mari Matarazzo; Most votes to save	
3	6	8	Pe Lanza; Anne Duarte; 11.41% to save	Adryana Ribeiro; Albert Bressan; 26.68% to save		Brenda Paixão; Matheus Sampaio; 61.91% to save	
4	7	11 (Day 74)	Rafael Pessina; Talira Manñes; 11.54% to save	Rayanne Morais; Victor Pecoraro; 27.51% to save		Radamés Furlan; Carol Furlan; 60.95% to save	
5	5	8	Filipe Duarte; Nina Cachoeira; 11.55% to save	Déborah Albuquerque; Bruno Salomão; 41.07% to save		Renata Dominguez; Leandro Gléria; 47.38% to save	
6	6	11 (Day 74)	João Hadad; Luana Andrade †; 11.89% to save	Brenda Paixão; Matheus Sampaio; Most votes to save		Mussunzinho; Karol Menezes; Most votes to save	
7	7	9	Kadu Moliterno; Cris Menezes; 13.46% to save	Rafael Pessina; Talira Manñes; 36.32% to save		Eike Duarte; Natália Vivacqua; 50.22% to save	
8	5	6	Márcia Fellipe; Rod Bala; 14.51% to save	Mirela Janis; Yugnir Ângelo; 15.17% to save	Matheus Yurley; Mari Matarazzo; 27.63% to save	Déborah Albuquerque; Bruno Salomão; 42.69% to save	
9	6	7	Ivy Moraes; Nandinho Borges; 14.99% to save	Adryana Ribeiro; Albert Bressan; 29.44% to save		Brenda Paixão; Matheus Sampaio; 55.57% to save	
10	6	5	Cartolouco; Gabi Augusto; 15.63% to save	Adryana Ribeiro; Albert Bressan; 41.48% to save		Brenda Paixão; Matheus Sampaio; 42.89% to save	

== Spin-offs ==
=== Power Couple Live ===
Power Couple Live is an online spin-off program streamed on PlayPlus following each elimination night of Power Couple Brasil. It features interviews with eliminated couples, guest appearances, and exclusive behind-the-scenes content.

Initially hosted by Gianne Albertoni, the show saw several host changes across seasons: Junno Andrade (Seasons 2–3), Flávia Viana & Marcelo Zangrandi (Season 4), Lidi Lisboa & Lucas Selfie (Seasons 5–6), and finally Lucas Selfie as the sole host in Season 7.

=== PowerCast ===
In Seasons 5 and 6, Dani Bavoso also hosted the show's official podcast—available on YouTube and major streaming platforms—in which she interviewed couples from previous seasons. In Season 7, Lucas Selfie took over as host of the weekly live broadcast, covering key developments, controversies, and featuring guest influencers.

=== Power Couple Especial ===
On December 22, 2021, Power Couple Brasil aired a special edition hosted by Adriane Galisteu. The episode featured five celebrity couples competing in the traditional challenges: the Women's Challenge, the Men's Challenge, and the Couples' Challenge.

Renata Alves & Diego Gonzaga won the competition with a record-high 93.75% of the public vote over MC Koringa & Manoela Alcantara, who received 6.25%. The winning couple was awarded R$30.000. The broadcast achieved an average viewership rating of 5.3 points.

Celebrity	Age	Hometown	Occupation	Partner	Age	Hometown	Occupation	Status
Maurício Mattar	57	Rio de Janeiro	Actor	Shay Dufau	32	Rio de Janeiro	Manager	Eliminated 1st on December 22, 2021
Naldo Benny	42	Rio de Janeiro	Singer	Ellen Cardoso	40	São Paulo	Dancer	Eliminated 2nd on December 22, 2021
Regis Danese	48	Passos	Singer	Kelly Danese	45	São Caetano do Sul	Singer	Eliminated 3rd on December 22, 2021
MC Koringa	41	Petrópolis	Singer	Manoela Alcantara	38	Rio de Janeiro	Businesswoman	Runner-up on December 22, 2021
Renata Alves	42	Recife	Journalist	Diego Gonzaga	40	Aracaju	Businessman	Winners on December 22, 2021

== Ratings ==
=== Brazilian ratings ===
All numbers are in points and provided by Kantar Ibope Media.

Season	Timeslot (BRT)	Episodes	Premiered		Ended		TV season	SP viewers (in points)	Source
Season	Timeslot (BRT)	Episodes	Date	Viewers (in points)	Date	Viewers (in points)	TV season	SP viewers (in points)	Source
1	Tuesday 10:30 p.m.	11	April 12, 2016	8.9	June 21, 2016	11.1	2016	9.49	
2	Tuesday 10:30 p.m. Thursday 10:30 p.m.	20	April 18, 2017	6.8	June 22, 2017	7.9	2017	7.40	
3	Mon–Fri 10:30 p.m.	48	April 24, 2018	7.4	June 28, 2018	9.0	2018	7.88	
4	Mon–Fri 10:30 p.m.	63	April 30, 2019	7.7	July 25, 2019	7.9	2019	7.12	
5	Mon–Sat 10:30 p.m.	66	May 9, 2021	6.0	July 23, 2021	8.8	2021	6.35	
6	Mon–Sat 10:30 p.m.	64	May 2, 2022	5.2	July 14, 2022	5.7	2022	4.86	
7	Mon–Sat 10:30 p.m. Sunday 02:00 p.m.	66	April 29, 2025	5.2	July 10, 2025	5.1	2025	4.29	

- Each point represents a specific number of households in São Paulo.
  - 2016: 69.000 households.
  - 2017: 70.500 households.
  - 2018: 71.855 households.
  - 2019: 73.015 households.
  - 2021: 76.577 households.
  - 2022: 74.666 households.
  - 2025: 77.488 households.
