= A Fazenda 8 =

Season of television series

- Season 8
- Hosted by: Roberto Justus
- No. of days: 78
- No. of contestants: 16
- Winner: Douglas Sampaio
- Runner-up: Ana Paula Minerato
- Companion show: A Fazenda Online
- No. of episodes: 75

Release
- Original network: RecordTV
- Original release: September 23 – December 8, 2015

Season chronology
- ← Previous; A Fazenda 7 Next → A Fazenda 9

A Fazenda 8 was the eighth season of the Brazilian reality television series A Fazenda, which premiered on Wednesday, September 23, 2015, on RecordTV. For the first time, the show was hosted by Roberto Justus (replacing Britto Júnior, who left the show after seven seasons), reports by Bruna Calmon and commanded by Gianne Albertoni on A Fazenda Online.

This season is part of a millionaire contract signed in 2011 between Strix Television and Rede Record which guaranteed the show's rights until 2019.

This season marks the debut of Roberto Justus hosting the show, replacing Britto Júnior, who hosted the previous seven seasons. Gianne Albertoni returns as the show's commander on A Fazenda Online and events of sponsorship, bonuses and reports are hosted by Bruna Calmon. The grand prize for the winner is R$ 2 million without tax allowances, with a brand new car offered to the runner-up.

On December 8, 2015, 22-year-old actor Douglas Sampaio won the competition with 52.90% of the public vote over model and former Panicat Ana Paula Minerato (46.58%) and actor Luka Ribeiro (0.52%).

== Twists ==
=== The teams ===
The teams Rabbit, Sheep and Ostrich (present on the seasons 3, 4, 6 and 7) became extinct and were replaced by two teams (Axe and Saw).

=== The stall ===
In this new season, the barn was replaced by the stall. Every week, three contestants will have to share space with the horses and sleep beside the animals.

== Contestants ==
The first three contestants were revealed on September 21, 2015, live on the Xuxa Meneghel show. These being: Amaral, Mara Maravilha and Rayanne Morais. The singer Rafael Ilha, the former thumb, who had been confirmed in A Fazenda, could not participate due to legal problems, being replaced by actor Luka Ribeiro, who went live in the reality, in the debut show. Another substitution was with Sheislane Hayalla, runner-up in Miss Amazonas, who lost her place in confinement after a former aide publicized her name to gossip media.

Below is biographical information according to the Record official site, plus footnoted additions.
(ages stated are correct at the start of the contest)

Contestant	Age	Background	Hometown	Original team	Merged team	Status	Finish
Amaral	42	Former Football Player	Capivari	Axe		Eliminated 1st on October 1, 2015	16th
Edu K	46	Musician	Porto Alegre	Axe		Eliminated 2nd on October 8, 2015	15th
Veridiana Freitas	27	Model	Balneário Camboriú	Saw		Eliminated 3rd on October 15, 2015	14th
Ovelha	60	Musician	Olinda	Saw		Eliminated 4th on October 22, 2015	13th
Thiago Servo	29	Sertanejo singer	Maringá	Saw		Walked on October 24, 2015	12th
Rebeca Gusmão	31	Former Swimmer	Brasília	Axe		Eliminated 5th on October 29, 2015	11th
Li Martins	31	Singer & Actress	Sertanópolis	Axe		Eliminated 6th on November 5, 2015	10th
Quelynah	34	Singer & Actress	São Paulo	Axe		Eliminated 7th on November 12, 2015	9th
Carla Prata	34	Dancer & TV Host	Rio de Janeiro	Axe		Eliminated 8th on November 19, 2015	8th
Mara Maravilha	47	Singer & TV Host	Itapetinga	Saw	Final Seven	Eliminated 9th on November 26, 2015	7th
Marcelo Bimbi	30	Model	Rio Branco	Axe	Final Seven	Eliminated 10th on December 1, 2015	6th
JP Mantovani †	31	Model & TV Host	Campinas	Axe	Final Seven	Eliminated 11th on December 3, 2015	5th
Rayanne Morais	27	Beauty Queen	Jeceaba	Saw	Final Seven	Eliminated 12th on December 5, 2015	4th
Luka Ribeiro	44	Actor	Rio de Janeiro	Saw	Final Seven	Third place on December 8, 2015	3rd
Ana Paula Minerato	24	Model & Former Panicat	São Paulo	Saw	Final Seven	Runner-up on December 8, 2015	2nd
Douglas Sampaio	22	Actor	Rio de Janeiro	Saw	Final Seven	Winner on December 8, 2015	1st

== Future appearances ==
In 2017, Ana Paula Minerato returned to compete in A Fazenda 9, she finished in 9th place in the competition.

In 2017, Carla Prata appeared in Dancing Brasil 2, she finished in 6th place in the competition.

In 2018, Douglas Sampaio appeared in Dancing Brasil 3, he finished in 10th place in the competition.

In 2018, Amaral appeared in Dancing Brasil 4, he finished in 4th place in the competition, in 2022, Amaral appeared as a Dog in The Masked Singer Brasil 2, he joined at the Group B third round as a wildcard, he sang three songs before his unmasking at the eighth episode, placing 9th in the competition.

In 2019, Marcelo Bimbi appeared with his wife Nicole Bahls in Power Couple Brasil 4, they originally finished in 8th place, however they comeback to the game and finished as winners from the competition.

In 2021, JP Mantovani and Li Martins appeared as a couple in Power Couple Brasil 5, they finished in 3rd place in the competition.

In 2023, Thiago Servo appeared on A Grande Conquista 1, he have to compete for a place to enter in the game, Thiago, at first, didn't receive enough votes to enter in the game but in the villa won his place in the mansion and won the game.

In 2025, Rayanne Morais appeared with her husband Victor Pecoraro in Power Couple Brasil 7, they finished in 3rd place in the competition.

== The game ==
=== Obligations ===
	Week 1	Week 2	Week 3	Week 4	Week 5	Week 6	Week 7	Week 8	Week 9	Week 10	Week 11
Farmer	**Marcelo**	**Ana Paula**	**Marcelo**	**Mara**	**JP**	**Douglas**	**JP**	**Douglas**	**Rayanne**	**Ana Paula**	
Cows	Douglas	Thiago	Edu	Thiago	Ana Paula	Ana Paula	Ana Paula	Ana Paula	JP	Douglas	Ana Paula
Horses	Luka	Luka	Rebeca	JP	Luka	Luka	Luka	Carla	Marcelo	Luka	Luka
Llama	Edu	Rayanne	Veridiana	Carla	Li	Rayanne	Quelynah	Luka	Mara	Mara	Rayanne
Garden & Plants	Rayanne	Marcelo	Mara	Rebeca	Rayanne	Marcelo	Rayanne	Marcelo	Ana Paula	JP	JP
Sheep & Goats	Ovelha	Rebeca	Li	Luka	Marcelo	Li	Douglas	Rayanne	Carla	Rayanne	Rayanne
Pigs	Carla	Veridiana	Rayanne	Ovelha	Carla	Mara	Marcelo	Mara	Douglas	Marcelo	Douglas
Ostriches	JP	Edu	JP	Marcelo	Rebeca	Quelynah	Marcelo	JP	JP	JP	JP
Birds	Ana Paula	Mara	Carla	Quelynah	Douglas	JP	Mara	JP	Luka	Mara	JP
Trash	Veridiana	Carla	Quelynah	Rayanne	Mara	Carla	Carla	Mara	Douglas	Marcelo	Douglas

=== Key power ===
Since season 5, contestants compete to win the Key Power each week. The Key Power holder is the only contestant who can open the mystery box located at the Farm. However, opening the box will unleash either a good consequence or a bad consequence at the nomination process.

This season, only two pre-selected contestants (one from each team) are allowed to compete each round. The winner becomes the Key Power holder for the week, while the loser is sent to the stall, along with two other contestants (one from each team) selected by the winner of the round. The Key Holder's choice is marked in bold.

Results

Week	Players	Winner	Sent to the Stall	Consequences
1	Rebeca	Douglas	Amaral, Luka, Rebeca	Choose two contestant from his team (**Ovelha** & **Rayanne**) and one from the other team (**Carla**) to win an immunity.; Choose a contestant from the stall to have a double vote (**Luka**)
1	Douglas	Douglas	Amaral, Luka, Rebeca	Choose two contestant from his team (**Ovelha** & **Rayanne**) and one from the other team (**Carla**) to win an immunity.; Choose a contestant from the stall to have a double vote (**Luka**)
2	JP	JP	Douglas, Edu, Luka	Choose two contestant from his team to win an immunity (**Li** & **Quelynah**); Ban another contestant from his team from nominating (**Marcelo**)
2	Luka	JP	Douglas, Edu, Luka	Choose two contestant from his team to win an immunity (**Li** & **Quelynah**); Ban another contestant from his team from nominating (**Marcelo**)
3	Carla	Carla	Ana Paula, Quelynah, Thiago	Choose between **win R$10,000** or receive immunity.; Change the 3rd nominee (**Thiago**) for another contestant (**Mara**).
3	Thiago	Carla	Ana Paula, Quelynah, Thiago	Choose between **win R$10,000** or receive immunity.; Change the 3rd nominee (**Thiago**) for another contestant (**Mara**).
4	JP	JP	Carla, Douglas, Rayanne	Choose five contestants to banish from voting (**Ana Paula, Douglas, Luka, Ovelha** & **Rayanne**).
4	Douglas	JP	Carla, Douglas, Rayanne	Choose five contestants to banish from voting (**Ana Paula, Douglas, Luka, Ovelha** & **Rayanne**).
5	Marcelo	Marcelo	Mara, Quelynah, Thiago	**Won R$10,000** and had to immunize two contestants from the stall (**Mara** & **Quelynah**, automatically due to Thiago's withdrawal); Save one contestant from became the third nominee (**Li**).
5	Mara	Marcelo	Mara, Quelynah, Thiago	**Won R$10,000** and had to immunize two contestants from the stall (**Mara** & **Quelynah**, automatically due to Thiago's withdrawal); Save one contestant from became the third nominee (**Li**).
6	Li	Rayanne	JP, Li, Mara	Choose between win an immunity for yourself or **immunize another contestant** (**Mara**).; Your vote (**Marcelo**) count as two votes.
6	Rayanne	Rayanne	JP, Li, Mara	Choose between win an immunity for yourself or **immunize another contestant** (**Mara**).; Your vote (**Marcelo**) count as two votes.
7	Quelynah	Ana Paula	Marcelo, Quelynah, Rayanne	Choose between **win an immunity and not to vote** or not win an immunity and vote.; Your Key power opponent (**Quelynah**) is automatically nominated.
7	Ana Paula	Ana Paula	Marcelo, Quelynah, Rayanne	Choose between **win an immunity and not to vote** or not win an immunity and vote.; Your Key power opponent (**Quelynah**) is automatically nominated.
8	JP	JP	Ana Paula, Carla, Luka	Choose one contestant to have a double vote (**Marcelo**); Exchange one nominee (**Luka**) for another contestant (**Carla**).
8	Luka	JP	Ana Paula, Carla, Luka	Choose one contestant to have a double vote (**Marcelo**); Exchange one nominee (**Luka**) for another contestant (**Carla**).
9	Team; Saw	Luka	JP, Marcelo	1 − Luka: **Won a place in the final**; 2 − Rayanne: **Won a letter from home**; 3 − Ana Paula: **Won R$30,000**; 4 − Mara: Ban one nominee to compete for Farmer (Marcelo).
10	Final; Six	Rayanne	Douglas, Marcelo	Rayanne couldn't be nominee by the Farmer of the Week; Residents of the stall will also be voted by the house.

=== Instant choice ===
The Instant Choice continued on this season. During the designated/announced five-minute voting window, Twitter users (with public accounts only) may vote to select a contestant to receive a special opportunity not available to others (which may or may not influence directly in the game) by tweeting the option's keyword along with the show's designated hashtag.

Week	Player	Question	Options	Vote	Brazil's choice
1	Douglas	Douglas should open the red envelope and win a prize of R$10,000.00?	Yes	48%	No
1	Douglas	Douglas should open the red envelope and win a prize of R$10,000.00?	No	52%	No
2	JP	JP should open the red envelope and win a picnic with a contestant?	Yes	20%	No
2	JP	JP should open the red envelope and win a picnic with a contestant?	No	80%	No
3	Carla	Carla should open the red envelope and make the lunch and do the dishes for all contestants?	Yes	89%	Yes
3	Carla	Carla should open the red envelope and make the lunch and do the dishes for all contestants?	No	11%	Yes
4	JP	JP should open the red envelope and win a horseback riding outside the farm with a contestant of his choice?	Yes	18%	No
4	JP	JP should open the red envelope and win a horseback riding outside the farm with a contestant of his choice?	No	82%	No
5	Marcelo	Marcelo should receive a film session in the tree house with a guest?	Yes	33%	No
5	Marcelo	Marcelo should receive a film session in the tree house with a guest?	No	67%	No
6	Rayanne	Rayanne must choose two contestants from different teams to stay tied together?	Yes	40%	No
6	Rayanne	Rayanne must choose two contestants from different teams to stay tied together?	No	60%	No
7	Ana Paula	Ana Paula should be dressed as a man for 24 hours?	Yes	%	No
7	Ana Paula	Ana Paula should be dressed as a man for 24 hours?	No	%	No
8	JP	JP should open the red envelope and win a helicopter ride with a contestant?	Yes	%	Yes
8	JP	JP should open the red envelope and win a helicopter ride with a contestant?	No	%	Yes

== Voting history ==
	Week 1	Week 2	Week 3	Week 4	Week 5	Week 6	Week 7	Week 8	Week 9	Week 10		Week 11		Nominations received
	Week 1	Week 2	Week 3	Week 4	Week 5	Week 6	Week 7	Week 8	Week 9	Day 69	Day 72	Day 73	Finale	Nominations received
Farmer of the Week	Marcelo	Ana Paula	Marcelo	Mara	JP	Douglas	JP	Douglas	Rayanne	Ana Paula	(none)			
Nominated (Farmer)	Ana Paula	Marcelo	Luka	JP	Douglas	JP	Douglas	Mara	Ana Paula	Marcelo	(none)			
Nominated (House)	Thiago	Mara	Veridiana	Ovelha	Rebeca	Marcelo	Carla	Rayanne	Mara	Rayanne	(none)			
Nominated (Others)	Amaral	Edu	Mara	Carla	Carla	Li	Quelynah	Carla	Marcelo	(none)	Douglas; JP	Ana Paula; Rayanne	(none)	
Douglas	Mara	Mara	Veridiana	~~Quelynah~~	Rebeca	Farmer of the Week	Mara	Farmer of the Week	Mara	JP	Nominee	Saved	Winner (Day 78)	5
Ana Paula	Li	Farmer of the Week	Veridiana	~~Ovelha~~	Rebeca	Marcelo	Exempt	Rayanne	Douglas	Farmer of the Week	Saved	Nominee	Runner-up (Day 78)	3
Luka	Quelynah (x2)	JP	Veridiana	~~Marcelo~~	Rebeca	Marcelo	Carla	Rayanne	Douglas	Rayanne	Exempt	Exempt	3rd Place (Day 78)	1
Rayanne	Quelynah	JP	Veridiana	~~Quelynah~~	Rebeca	Marcelo (x2)	Mara	JP	Farmer of the Week	JP	Saved	Nominee	Evicted (Day 75)	14
JP	Thiago	Mara	Mara	Ovelha	Farmer of the Week	Rayanne	Farmer of the Week	Rayanne	Mara	Rayanne	Nominee	Evicted (Day 73)		7
Marcelo	Farmer of the Week	Banned	Farmer of the Week	Ovelha	Rebeca	Rayanne	Carla	Rayanne (x2)	Mara	Rayanne	Evicted (Day 71)			9
Mara	Thiago	Veridiana	Veridiana	Farmer of the Week	Carla	Marcelo	Carla	Rayanne	Douglas	Evicted (Day 66)				25
Carla	Thiago	Mara	Mara	Ovelha	Rebeca	Marcelo	Mara	Marcelo	Evicted (Day 59)					6
Quelynah	Thiago	Mara	Mara	Ana Paula	Rebeca	Rayanne	Carla	Evicted (Day 52)						6
Li	Thiago	Mara	Mara	Ovelha	Rebeca	Rayanne	Evicted (Day 45)							2
Rebeca	Thiago	Mara	Mara	Ovelha	Rayanne	Evicted (Day 38)								9
Thiago	Mara	Veridiana	Veridiana	Ovelha	Walked (Day 33)									9
Ovelha	Quelynah	Carla	Veridiana	~~Rebeca~~	Evicted (Day 31)									7
Veridiana	Mara	Mara	Mara	Evicted (Day 24)										9
Edu	Thiago	Mara	Evicted (Day 17)											1
Amaral	Thiago	Evicted (Day 10)												1
Notes	1	2	3	4	5	6	7	8	9, 10, 11	12	13	14	15	
Up for Nomination	Amaral; Ana Paula; Thiago	Edu; Mara; Marcelo	Luka; Mara; Veridiana	Carla; JP; Ovelha	Carla; Douglas; Rebeca	JP; Li; Marcelo	Carla; Douglas; Quelynah	Carla; Mara; Rayanne	Ana Paula; Mara; Marcelo	(none)				
Saved	Ana Paula	Marcelo	Mara	JP	Douglas	JP	Douglas	Rayanne	Ana Paula	(none)				
Nominated for Eviction	Amaral; Thiago	Edu; Mara	Luka; Veridiana	Carla; Ovelha	Carla; Rebeca	Li; Marcelo	Carla; Quelynah	Carla; Mara	Mara; Marcelo	Marcelo; Rayanne	Douglas; JP	Ana Paula; Rayanne	Ana Paula; Douglas; Luka	
Walked	(none)				Thiago	(none)								
Evicted	Amaral; 23.75% to save	Edu; 42.20% to save	Veridiana; 41.58% to save	Ovelha; 47.85% to save	Rebeca; 23.97% to save	Li; 41.22% to save	Quelynah; 47.11% to save	Carla; 48.33% to save	Mara; 42.54% to save	Marcelo; 44.31% to save	JP; 25.89% to save	Rayanne; 47.29% to save	Luka; 0.52% to win	
Evicted	Amaral; 23.75% to save	Edu; 42.20% to save	Veridiana; 41.58% to save	Ovelha; 47.85% to save	Rebeca; 23.97% to save	Li; 41.22% to save	Quelynah; 47.11% to save	Carla; 48.33% to save	Mara; 42.54% to save	Marcelo; 44.31% to save	JP; 25.89% to save	Rayanne; 47.29% to save	Ana Paula; 46.58% to win	
Evicted	Amaral; 23.75% to save	Edu; 42.20% to save	Veridiana; 41.58% to save	Ovelha; 47.85% to save	Rebeca; 23.97% to save	Li; 41.22% to save	Quelynah; 47.11% to save	Carla; 48.33% to save	Mara; 42.54% to save	Marcelo; 44.31% to save	JP; 25.89% to save	Rayanne; 47.29% to save	Douglas; 52.90% to win	

=== Notes ===
- ^Note 1 : Key Power holder Douglas opened the mystery box, which contained two envelopes. He was allowed to open the first envelope and revealed that he had to choose two contestants from his team and one from the other team to win an immunity. He gave immunities to Ovelha and Rayanne (Saw) and Carla (Axe). In the second envelope Douglas had to choose one contestant between the ones in the stall to have his nomination counted as two. He chose Luka, so his vote on Quelynah counted as two votes against her.
- ^Note 2 : Key Power holder JP opened the mystery box, which contained two envelopes. He was allowed to open the first envelope and revealed that he had to choose two contestants from his team to win an immunity. He chose Li and Quelynah. In the second envelope he had to choose to ban one contestant from his team to nominating. He banned Marcelo.
- ^Note 3 : Veridiana got more votes by house and was nominated. She had to choose the third nominee between Ana Paula, Quelynah and Thiago, who were in the stall. She chose Thiago. However, Carla opened the second envelope that said she should replace the third nominee by another contestant of her choice. She decided to nominate Mara.
- ^Note 4 : JP, the Key Power holder, opened the first envelope and had to banish five contestants from voting. He chose Ana Paula, Luka, Ovelha, Douglas and Rayanne.
- ^Note 5 : Key Power holder Marcelo opened the first envelope in the mystery box and had to immunize two contestants from the stall (Mara and Quelynah). According to the second envelope, the remaining eligible contestants were asked to save one contestant. Carla was the last one and became the third nominee for the week.
- ^Note 6 : Key Power holder Rayanne opened the first envelope in the mystery box and had to choose between immunize herself or immunize another contestant. She decided to immunize Mara. In the second envelope she was told that their vote was counted as two.
- ^Note 7 : Key Power holder Ana Paula opened the first envelope in the mystery box and had to choose between win an immunity and not to vote or not win an immunity and vote. She decided for the first option. In the second envelope she was told that her opponent in the Key Power would be automatically named, leaving Quelynah as the third nominee.
- ^Note 8 : Key Power holder JP opened the mystery box, which contained two envelopes. In the first envelope, JP had to choose one contestant to have his nomination counted as two. He chose Marcelo, so his vote on Rayanne counted as two votes against her. After the vote, the three nominees were: Mara (by Farmer), Rayanne (by House) and Luka (by Stall). However, in the second envelope it was revealed that JP must replace one of them. He chose Carla to replace Luka as this week's nominees.
- ^Note 9 : The Saw team holds the Key Power, so each team member had their own envelope chosen by Key Power challenge winner Luka. Since there were only four envelopes for five members, Luka decided that Douglas wouldn't get an envelope. Before the vote take place, Luka won a place in the final after opening the 1st envelope. Rayanne opened the 2nd envelope and won a letter from home. The remaining twists would only be revealed after the vote.
- ^Note 10 : Douglas and Mara received the most nominations with three each. Rayanne, as Farmer of the Week, had the casting vote and choose Mara to be the second nominee.
- ^Note 11 : After the vote, Ana Paula opened the 3rd envelope and won R$30,000. Finally, Mara opened the 4th and final envelope, that asked her to ban one nominee (Ana Paula, Mara or Marcelo) from competing for the next Farmer. She banned Marcelo, so he is automatically up to the public vote.
- ^Note 12 : Rayanne opened the first envelope and was informed that she could not be nominated by the farmer Ana Paula. After Ana Paula's vote, she was eligible to receive nominations.
- ^Note 13 : On day 72, the four eligible contestants competed in a special nomination challenge. Ana Paula and Rayanne won the challenge, therefore, Douglas and JP become this round's nominees by default.
- ^Note 14 : On day 73, the three eligible contestants competed in the final immunity challenge for place in the final. Douglas was the winner and became the second finalist of the season. Ana Paula and Rayanne were automatically nominated for the final eviction of the season.
- ^Note 15 : For the final, the public votes for the contestant they want to win A Fazenda 8.
