= Power Couple (Brazilian TV series) season 5 =

Power Couple
- Season 5
- Hosted by: Adriane Galisteu
- No. of days: 78
- No. of contestants: 26 (13 couples)
- Winner: Matheus & Mari
- Runner-up: Déborah & Bruno
- Companion show: Power Couple Online
- No. of episodes: 66

Release
- Original network: RecordTV
- Original release: May 9 – July 23, 2021

Additional information
- Filming dates: May 7 – July 23, 2021

Season chronology
- ← Previous; Season 4 Next → Season 6

The fifth season of Power Couple premiered on Sunday, May 9, 2021, at 10:30 p.m. on RecordTV.

The show features thirteen celebrity couples living under one roof and facing extreme challenges that will test how well they really know each other. Each week, a couple will be eliminated until the last couple wins the grand prize.

Adriane Galisteu replaced Gugu Liberato as the main host, thus becoming the show's first female host. Journalist Dani Bavoso, who is returned for this season, and actress Lidi Lisboa replaced Flávia Viana and Marcelo Zangrandi as the show's online hosts and correspondents.

In May 2021, RecordTV announced that various changes would occur with the format. The show will air six times a week (Monday to Saturday) instead of five. At the end of each cycle, viewers at home will determine which two out of the three nominated couples will continue in the game.

The season was originally expected to air in 2020, but production was postponed due to safety concerns resulting from the COVID-19 pandemic.

Matheus Yurley & Mari Matarazzo won the competition with 63.41% of the public vote over Déborah Albuquerque & Bruno Salomão and took home the R$403.000 prize they accumulated during the show. Déborah & Bruno received a brand new car as the runners-up.

== Cast ==
The couples were officially revealed by RecordTV on April 26–30, 2021. On May 6, 2021, reporter Adriana Bombom and Adrien Cunha had withdrawn from competing after Adrien was diagnosed with appendicitis which would require an urgent surgery. Olympic gymnast Dany Hypólito and Fábio Castro were announced as their replacement.

=== Couples ===
Celebrity	Occupation	Partner	Occupation	Status
Medrado	Singer	MC Claytão	DJ	Eliminated 1st on May 20, 2021
MC Mirella	Singer	Dynho Alves	Singer	Eliminated 2nd on May 27, 2021
Pimpolho	Musician	Bibi Paolillo	Teacher	Eliminated 3rd on June 3, 2021
JonJon	DJ	Carol Santos	Businesswoman	Eliminated 4th on June 10, 2021
Márcia Fellipe	Singer	Rod Bala	Musical productor	Eliminated 5th on June 17, 2021
Mirela Janis	Digital influencer	Yugnir Ângelo	Businessman	Eliminated 6th on June 24, 2021
Filipe Duarte	Singer	Nina Cachoeira	Model	Eliminated 7th on July 1, 2021
Dany Hypólito	Gymnast	Fábio Castro	Choreographer	Eliminated 8th on July 8, 2021
Renata Dominguez	Actress	Leandro Gléria	Public relations	Eliminated 9th on July 15, 2021
Thiago Bertoldo	Singer	Geórgia Fröhlich	Actress	Eliminated 10th on July 20, 2021
Li Martins	Singer	JP Mantovani †	TV host	Eliminated 11th on July 21, 2021
Déborah Albuquerque	TV host	Bruno Salomão	Doctor	Runner-up on July 23, 2021
Matheus Yurley	Digital influencer	Mari Matarazzo	Digital influencer	Winners on July 23, 2021

== Future Appearances ==
After this season, in 2021, Dynho Alves (from Mirella & Dynho) and Fernanda Medrado (from Medrado & Claytão) appeared in A Fazenda 13. Medrado quit the game and finished in 22nd place, while Dynho finished in 6th place.

In 2022, Deborah Albuquerque (from Deborah & Bruno) appeared in A Fazenda 14, she finished in 11th place in the competition.

In 2022, MC Mirella (from Mirella & Dynho) appeared on De Férias com o Ex Caribe: Salseiro VIP as original cast member.

In 2023, Medrado (from Medrado & Claytão) appeared on A Grande Conquista 1, she have to compete for a place to enter in the game, Medrado won her place in the mansion and finished the game 13th place.

In 2025, Daniele Hypólito (from Dany & Fábio) appeared in Big Brother Brasil 25, being the first former contestant of a reality show on Record to enter this program. Daniele finished in 10th place in the competition.

== The game ==
Key

Men's challenge bet	Women's challenge bet	**T** Total money combined	Passed the challenge (adds the betting sum)	Failed the challenge (deducts the betting sum)	Won couples' challenge (immunity and adds R$20.000)

=== Challenges' results ===
		Week 1	Week 2	Week 3	Week 4	Week 5	Week 6	Week 7	Week 8	Week 9	Week 10	Week 11	
		Week 1	Week 2	Week 3	Week 4	Week 5	Week 6	Week 7	Week 8	Week 9	Week 10	Day 73	Finale
Sum of money		R$40.000	R$40.000	R$40.000	R$40.000	R$40.000	R$40.000	R$40.000	R$40.000	R$40.000	R$40.000		Jackpot
Bets
Matheus & Mari		R$011.000	R$024.000	R$011.000	R$014.000	R$010.000	R$008.000	R$010.000	R$018.000	R$008.000	R$015.000	—	R$403.000
Matheus & Mari		R$022.000	R$016.000	R$009.000	R$018.000	R$003.000	R$017.000	R$006.000	R$010.000	R$020.000	R$025.000	—	R$403.000
Matheus & Mari	T	R$029.000	R$048.000	R$060.000	R$044.000	R$053.000	R$023.000	R$044.000	R$048.000	R$012.000	R$050.000	Nominated	R$403.000
Déborah & Bruno		R$030.000	R$030.000	R$039.000	R$018.000	R$023.000	R$011.000	R$015.000	R$001.000	R$020.000	R$023.000	—	R$648.000
Déborah & Bruno		R$030.000	R$019.000	R$079.000	R$025.000	R$015.000	R$020.000	R$005.000	R$039.000	R$005.000	R$014.000	—	R$648.000
Déborah & Bruno	T	R$100.000	R$049.000	R$158.000	R$067.000	R$078.000	R$009.000	R$060.000	R$000.000	R$065.000	R$054.000	Nominated	R$648.000
Li & JP		R$023.000	R$013.000	R$016.000	R$025.000	R$020.000	R$001.000	R$007.000	R$041.000	R$010.000	R$040.000	—	R$547.000
Li & JP		R$017.000	R$010.000	R$012.000	R$011.000	R$016.000	R$019.000	R$003.000	R$001.000	R$014.000	R$015.000	—	R$547.000
Li & JP	T	R$000.000	R$037.000	R$036.000	R$054.000	R$036.000	R$078.000	R$050.000	R$082.000	R$084.000	R$095.000	Saved	R$547.000
Thiago & Geórgia		R$016.000	R$009.000	R$013.000	R$009.000	R$013.000	R$010.000	R$009.000	R$024.000	R$011.000	R$022.000	—	R$586.000
Thiago & Geórgia		R$016.000	R$009.000	R$013.000	R$012.000	R$011.000	R$021.000	R$009.000	R$013.000	R$009.000	R$018.000	—	R$586.000
Thiago & Geórgia	T	R$040.000	R$058.000	R$066.000	R$061.000	R$064.000	R$029.000	R$078.000	R$023.000	R$042.000	R$100.000	Nominated	R$586.000
Renata & Leandro		R$014.000	R$018.000	R$021.000	R$030.000	R$005.000	R$012.000	R$013.000	R$007.000	R$009.000	R$004.000		R$471.000
Renata & Leandro		R$025.000	R$022.000	R$006.000	R$007.000	R$005.000	R$015.000	R$007.000	R$011.000	R$019.000	R$036.000		R$471.000
Renata & Leandro	T	R$079.000	R$050.000	R$025.000	R$063.000	R$050.000	R$037.000	R$046.000	R$058.000	R$050.000	R$008.000		R$471.000
Dany & Fábio		R$004.000	R$008.000	R$012.000	R$007.000	R$015.000	R$005.000	R$011.000	R$002.000	R$004.000			R$364.000
Dany & Fábio		R$021.000	R$004.000	R$008.000	R$013.000	R$010.000	R$013.000	R$008.000	R$012.000	R$015.000			R$364.000
Dany & Fábio	T	R$015.000	R$036.000	R$025.000	R$046.000	R$065.000	R$048.000	R$043.000	R$050.000	R$021.000			R$364.000
Filipe & Nina		R$013.000	R$020.000	R$020.000	R$020.000	R$012.000	R$009.000	R$014.000	R$020.000				R$368.000
Filipe & Nina		R$010.000	R$014.000	R$019.000	R$009.000	R$012.000	R$016.000	R$004.000	R$020.000				R$368.000
Filipe & Nina	T	R$063.000	R$074.000	R$001.000	R$069.000	R$016.000	R$015.000	R$050.000	R$080.000				R$368.000
Mirela Janis & Yugnir		R$010.000	R$002.000	R$010.000	R$002.000	R$011.000	R$006.000	R$006.000					R$257.000
Mirela Janis & Yugnir		R$011.000	R$008.000	R$004.000	R$008.000	R$009.000	R$022.000	R$000.000					R$257.000
Mirela Janis & Yugnir	T	R$019.000	R$050.000	R$046.000	R$046.000	R$038.000	R$012.000	R$046.000					R$257.000
Márcia & Rod		R$007.000	R$003.000	R$000.000	R$019.000	R$003.000	R$000.000						R$188.000
Márcia & Rod		R$007.000	R$017.000	R$007.000	R$010.000	R$004.000	R$039.000						R$188.000
Márcia & Rod	T	R$040.000	R$054.000	R$053.000	R$011.000	R$039.000	R$001.000						R$188.000
JonJon & Carol		R$003.000	R$010.000	R$015.000	R$010.000	R$018.000							R$309.000
JonJon & Carol		R$020.000	R$020.000	R$010.000	R$021.000	R$018.000							R$309.000
JonJon & Carol	T	R$063.000	R$070.000	R$065.000	R$071.000	R$040.000							R$309.000
Pimpolho & Bibi		R$015.000	R$011.000	R$018.000	R$003.000								R$184.000
Pimpolho & Bibi		R$015.000	R$011.000	R$005.000	R$002.000								R$184.000
Pimpolho & Bibi	T	R$070.000	R$062.000	R$017.000	R$035.000								R$184.000
Mirella & Dynho		R$005.000	R$025.000	R$005.000									R$147.000
Mirella & Dynho		R$005.000	R$015.000	R$018.000									R$147.000
Mirella & Dynho	T	R$050.000	R$080.000	R$017.000									R$147.000
Medrado & Claytão		R$012.000	R$007.000										R$095.000
Medrado & Claytão		R$014.000	R$024.000										R$095.000
Medrado & Claytão	T	R$038.000	R$057.000										R$095.000
Notes		(none)	1	2, 3	4, 5	(none)	6	7	8	9	10, 11	12	13
Least money (pre-challenge)		Li; JP	Déborah; Bruno	Filipe; Nina	Márcia; Rod	Filipe; Nina	Márcia; Rod	Dany; Fábio	Déborah; Bruno	Matheus; Mari	Renata; Leandro		
Couples' challenge winners		Mirella; Dynho	Déborah; Bruno	Márcia; Rod	Déborah; Bruno	Dany; Fábio	Li; JP	Thiago; Geórgia	Thiago; Geórgia	Li; JP	Thiago; Geórgia	Li; JP	
Nominated (pre-Couple's vote)
Couples' challenge losers		Pimpolho; Bibi	Medrado; Claytão	Filipe; Nina	Márcia; Rod	Matheus; Mari	Déborah; Bruno	Matheus; Mari	Filipe; Nina	Dany; Fábio	Li; JP		
Least money (post-challenge)		Li; JP	Dany; Fábio	Mirella; Dynho	Pimpolho; Bibi	Filipe; Nina	Márcia; Rod	Dany; Fábio	Déborah; Bruno	Matheus; Mari	Renata; Leandro		

==== Notes ====
- **^Note 1** : Pimpolho & Bibi ranked last in the Couples' challenge, however, as they were already nominated for having lost the Surprise challenge the previous week, Medrado & Claytão, as the second-to-last couple in the Couples' challenge were nominated.
- **^Note 2** : Dany & Fábio's sum of money was increased to R$45.000, while Déborah & Bruno had to bet all their remaining jackpot in the Women's Challenge, due to the use of Medrado & Claytão's inheritance power after Week 2's elimination night.
- **^Note 3** : Filipe & Nina ranked last in the Couples' challenge after quiting and were automatically nominated. As they were also the couple with the least money this week, the second-to-last couple in the money rank would become the second nominees. Mirella & Dynho and Pimpolho & Bibi were tied in the rank with R$17.000 each. Per the rules, since Pimpolho & Bibi have the most money in their overall bank account, they were saved.
- **^Note 4** : Márcia & Rod lost R$10.000 in their overall bank account, due to the use of Mirella & Dynho's inheritance power after Week 3's elimination night.
- **^Note 5** : Filipe & Nina and Márcia & Rod were tied in last place at this week's Couples' challenge as both couples quit. Per the rules, since Filipe & Nina have the most money in their overall bank account, they were saved. As Márcia & Rod were also the couple with the least money this week, the second-to-last couple in the money rank (Pimpolho & Bibi) would become the second nominees.
- **^Note 6** : Dany & Fábio had to bet their jackpot in the Women's Challenge, without seeing the explanation or details of the challenge, due to the use of JonJon & Carol's inheritance power after Week 5's elimination night. They chose to bet R$13.000 on the Women's Challenge.
- **^Note 7** : Li & JP were vetoed of compete in this week's Couples' challenge, due to the use of Márcia & Rod's inheritance power after Week 6's elimination night.
- **^Note 8** : Déborah & Bruno had to bet all their jackpot in the Women's Challenge, while Li & JP had to bet R$1.000, due to the use of Mirela Janis & Yugnir's inheritance power after Week 7's elimination night.
- **^Note 9** : Thiago & Geórgia had to exchange the challenges of this week with each other, due to the use of Filipe & Nina's inheritance power after Week 8's elimination night. Geórgia competed in the Men's Challenge, and Thiago competed in the Women's Challenge.
- **^Note 10** : Déborah & Bruno and Li & JP had to choose the value of each other's bet in the Women's Challenge, due to the use of Dany & Fábio's inheritance power after Week 9's elimination night. Déborah & Bruno chose R$15.000 in the value of Li & JP's bet, while Li & JP chose R$14.000 in the value of Déborah & Bruno's bet on the Women's Challenge.
- **^Note 11** : Thiago & Geórgia were immune for the money rank's nomination for being the Couples' challenge winner. However, this week's Power Couple were eligible to be nominated by the Couples' vote.
- **^Note 12** : No bets were made on this week. Instead, the final Couples' Challenge winner couple would be the first semifinalist of the season. Li & JP won the challenge and became the first semifinalists of the season. Déborah & Bruno, Matheus & Mari and Thiago & Geórgia were automatically nominated for the elimination.
- **^Note 13** : No bets were made on the first part of the Finale. Instead, the final three couples were automatically nominated for the final elimination of the season in order to determine the finalists.

=== Special power ===
This season, the couples' challenge winning couple also becomes the week's Power Couple. At the nomination ceremony, the couple will randomly picked two out of four film cans from different colors. Then, the couple would be given a choice between two advantages in the game; the couple's choice is marked in bold.

Week	Power Couple	Advantages
1	Mirella & Dynho	Choose a couple to receive the double votes.; **Trade a couple who is nominated by another couple who is not nominated**. →**Li & JP for Márcia & Rod**
2	Déborah & Bruno	Choose three couples to have the double votes.; **Trade a couple who is nominated by another couple who is not nominated (except Pimpolho & Bibi)**. →**Dany & Fábio for Márcia & Rod**
3	Márcia & Rod	Choose three couples to have their votes nullified.; **Transfer all the votes that any couple received to another couple**. →**Mirela Janis & Yugnir's votes to Déborah & Bruno**
4	Déborah & Bruno	Bet R$10.000 in one of the nominated couples to be eliminated.; **Save a nominated couple who in turn must nominate their replacement**. →**Cancelled**^{8}
5	Dany & Fábio	Cancel three votes received by one couple.; **Choose a couple to receive the double votes**. →**JonJon & Carol**
6	Li & JP	Save a nominated couple and the other nominated couples must nominate their replacement.; **Nominate a fourth couple**. →**Matheus & Mari**
7	Thiago & Geórgia	Multiply the votes received by a couple by two.; **Nominate a fourth couple who in turn must save one of the three other nominated couples**. →**Filipe & Nina** (nominated); **Dany & Fábio** (saved)
8	Thiago & Geórgia	Bet R$10.000 in one of the nominated couples to be eliminated.; **Cancel all the votes received by one couple**. →**Li & JP**
9	Li & JP	Bet a R$2.000 bonus to bet in the next cycle in each nominated couples that survives elimination.; **Multiply the votes received by a couple by two**. →**Renata & Leandro**
10	Thiago & Geórgia	Choose a couple to have their vote nullified.; **Transfer one vote that any couple received to another couple**. →**Déborah & Bruno's vote to Matheus & Mari**

=== Voting history ===
	Week 1	Week 2	Week 3	Week 4	Week 5	Week 6	Week 7	Week 8	Week 9	Week 10	Week 11		
	Week 1	Week 2	Week 3	Week 4	Week 5	Week 6	Week 7	Week 8	Week 9	Week 10	Day 74	Day 75	Finale
Power Couple	Mirella; Dynho	Déborah; Bruno	Márcia; Rod	Déborah; Bruno	Dany; Fábio	Li; JP	Thiago; Geórgia	Thiago; Geórgia	Li; JP	Thiago; Geórgia	Li; JP	(none)	
Nominated (Challenge)	Pimpolho; Bibi	Medrado; Claytão	Filipe; Nina	Márcia; Rod	Matheus; Mari	Déborah; Bruno	Matheus; Mari	Filipe; Nina	Dany; Fábio	Li; JP	(none)	(none)	
Nominated (Least money)	~~Li~~; ~~JP~~	~~Dany~~; ~~Fábio~~	Mirella; Dynho	Pimpolho; Bibi	Filipe; Nina	Márcia; Rod	~~Dany~~; ~~Fábio~~	Déborah; Bruno	Matheus; Mari	Renata; Leandro	(none)	(none)	
Nominated (Least money)	Márcia; Rod	Márcia; Rod	Mirella; Dynho	Pimpolho; Bibi	Filipe; Nina	Márcia; Rod	Filipe; Nina	Déborah; Bruno	Matheus; Mari	Renata; Leandro	(none)	(none)	
Nominated (Couples' vote)	Thiago; Geórgia	~~Thiago~~; ~~Geórgia~~	Déborah; Bruno	Li; JP	JonJon; Carol	Mirela Janis; Yugnir	Mirela Janis; Yugnir	Renata; Leandro	Renata; Leandro	Matheus; Mari	(none)	(none)	
Matheus & Mari	Déborah; Bruno	Li; JP	Déborah; Bruno	Li; JP	Li; JP	Filipe; Nina	Déborah; Bruno	~~Li~~; ~~JP~~	Renata; Leandro ^{(×2)}	Déborah; Bruno	Nominated	Nominated	**Winners** (Day 78)
Déborah & Bruno	Márcia; Rod	Dany; Fábio	~~Mirela Janis~~; ~~Yugnir~~; Déborah; Bruno	Li; JP	Márcia; Rod	Mirela Janis; Yugnir	Mirela Janis; Yugnir	Renata; Leandro	Renata; Leandro ^{(×2)}	Matheus; Mari	Nominated	Nominated	**Runner-up** (Day 78)
Li & JP	Márcia; Rod	Mirela Janis; Yugnir	Matheus; Mari	Renata; Leandro	Márcia; Rod	Mirela Janis; Yugnir ^{(×2)}	Mirela Janis; Yugnir	Renata; Leandro	Renata; Leandro ^{(×2)}	Matheus; Mari	Exempt	Nominated	Eliminated (Day 76)
Thiago & Geórgia	Filipe; Nina	JonJon; Carol	Pimpolho; Bibi	Filipe; Nina	Mirela Janis; Yugnir	Matheus; Mari	Filipe; Nina	Matheus; Mari	Renata; Leandro ^{(×2)}	Matheus; Mari	Nominated	Eliminated (Day 75)	
Renata & Leandro	Mirela Janis; Yugnir	Mirela Janis; Yugnir	Dany; Fábio	Li; JP	Li; JP	Filipe; Nina	Déborah; Bruno	~~Li~~; ~~JP~~	Déborah; Bruno	Déborah; Bruno	Eliminated (Day 70)		
Dany & Fábio	JonJon; Carol	JonJon; Carol	JonJon; Carol	JonJon; Carol	JonJon; Carol ^{(×3)}	Mirela Janis; Yugnir	Mirela Janis; Yugnir	Renata; Leandro	Déborah; Bruno	Eliminated (Day 63)			
Filipe & Nina	Thiago; Geórgia	Dany; Fábio	Déborah; Bruno	JonJon; Carol	JonJon; Carol ^{(×2)}	Mirela Janis; Yugnir	Mirela Janis; Yugnir	Renata; Leandro	Eliminated (Day 56)				
Mirela Janis & Yugnir	Renata; Leandro	Li; JP	Déborah; Bruno	Li; JP	Li; JP	Filipe; Nina	Déborah; Bruno	Eliminated (Day 49)					
Márcia & Rod	Déborah; Bruno	Li; JP	Déborah; Bruno	Li; JP	Li; JP	Filipe; Nina	Eliminated (Day 42)						
JonJon & Carol	Thiago; Geórgia	Thiago; Geórgia	Dany; Fábio	Filipe; Nina	Renata; Leandro	Eliminated (Day 35)							
Pimpolho & Bibi	Dany; Fábio	Thiago; Geórgia	Déborah; Bruno	Filipe; Nina	Eliminated (Day 28)								
Mirella & Dynho	Thiago; Geórgia ^{(×2)}	Thiago; Geórgia	Renata; Leandro	Eliminated (Day 21)									
Medrado & Claytão	Déborah; Bruno	Thiago; Geórgia	Eliminated (Day 14)										
Notes	1, 2, 3	4, 5	6	7, 8	9, 10	11, 12	13	14	15	16	17	18	19
Sent to elimination	Márcia; Rod	Márcia; Rod	Déborah; Bruno	Li; JP	Filipe; Nina	Déborah; Bruno	Filipe; Nina	Déborah; Bruno	Dany; Fábio	Li; JP	Déborah; Bruno	Déborah; Bruno	Déborah; Bruno
Sent to elimination	Márcia; Rod	Márcia; Rod	Déborah; Bruno	Li; JP	Filipe; Nina	Márcia; Rod	Filipe; Nina	Déborah; Bruno	Dany; Fábio	Li; JP	Déborah; Bruno	Déborah; Bruno	Déborah; Bruno
Sent to elimination	Pimpolho; Bibi	Medrado; Claytão	Filipe; Nina	Márcia; Rod	JonJon; Carol	Márcia; Rod	Matheus; Mari	Filipe; Nina	Matheus; Mari	Matheus; Mari	Matheus; Mari	Li; JP	Déborah; Bruno
Sent to elimination	Pimpolho; Bibi	Medrado; Claytão	Filipe; Nina	Márcia; Rod	JonJon; Carol	Matheus; Mari	Matheus; Mari	Filipe; Nina	Matheus; Mari	Matheus; Mari	Matheus; Mari	Li; JP	Matheus; Mari
Sent to elimination	Thiago; Geórgia	Pimpolho; Bibi	Mirella; Dynho	Pimpolho; Bibi	Matheus; Mari	Matheus; Mari	Mirela Janis; Yugnir	Renata; Leandro	Renata; Leandro	Renata; Leandro	Thiago; Geórgia	Matheus; Mari	Matheus; Mari
Sent to elimination	Thiago; Geórgia	Pimpolho; Bibi	Mirella; Dynho	Pimpolho; Bibi	Matheus; Mari	Mirela Janis; Yugnir	Mirela Janis; Yugnir	Renata; Leandro	Renata; Leandro	Renata; Leandro	Thiago; Geórgia	Matheus; Mari	Matheus; Mari
Eliminated	**Pimpolho**; **Bibi**; Nominated by challenge	**Medrado**; **Claytão**; 23.40% to save	**Mirella**; **Dynho**; 28.12% to save	**Pimpolho**; **Bibi**; 20.18% to save	**JonJon**; **Carol**; 19.97% to save	**Márcia**; **Rod**; 14.51% to save	**Mirela Janis**; **Yugnir**; 26.21% to save	**Filipe**; **Nina**; 11.55% to save	**Dany**; **Fábio**; 24.36% to save	**Renata**; **Leandro**; 28.73% to save	**Thiago**; **Geórgia**; 4.59% to save	**Li**; **JP**; 5.44% to save	**Déborah**; **Bruno**; 36.59% to win
Saved	**Thiago**; **Geórgia**; Saved by challenge	**Márcia**; **Rod**; 30.82% to save	**Filipe**; **Nina**; 35.37% to save	**Márcia**; **Rod**; 36.88% to save	**Filipe**; **Nina**; 23.40% to save	**Mirela Janis**; **Yugnir**; 15.17% to save	**Matheus**; **Mari**; 35.51% to save	**Déborah**; **Bruno**; 41.07% to save	**Renata**; **Leandro**; 29.59% to save	**Li**; **JP**; 29.48% to save	**Déborah**; **Bruno**; Most votes to save	**Déborah**; **Bruno**; Most votes to save	**Matheus**; **Mari**; 63.41% to win
Saved	**Thiago**; **Geórgia**; Saved by challenge	**Márcia**; **Rod**; 30.82% to save	**Filipe**; **Nina**; 35.37% to save	**Márcia**; **Rod**; 36.88% to save	**Filipe**; **Nina**; 23.40% to save	**Matheus**; **Mari**; 27.63% to save	**Matheus**; **Mari**; 35.51% to save	**Déborah**; **Bruno**; 41.07% to save	**Renata**; **Leandro**; 29.59% to save	**Li**; **JP**; 29.48% to save	**Déborah**; **Bruno**; Most votes to save	**Déborah**; **Bruno**; Most votes to save	**Matheus**; **Mari**; 63.41% to win
Saved	**Márcia**; **Rod**; Saved by challenge	**Pimpolho**; **Bibi**; 45.78% to save	**Déborah**; **Bruno**; 36.51% to save	**Li**; **JP**; 42.94% to save	**Matheus**; **Mari**; 56.63% to save	**Matheus**; **Mari**; 27.63% to save	**Filipe**; **Nina**; 38.28% to save	**Renata**; **Leandro**; 47.38% to save	**Matheus**; **Mari**; 46.05% to save	**Matheus**; **Mari**; 41.79% to save	**Matheus**; **Mari**; Most votes to save	**Matheus**; **Mari**; Most votes to save	**Matheus**; **Mari**; 63.41% to win
Saved	**Márcia**; **Rod**; Saved by challenge	**Pimpolho**; **Bibi**; 45.78% to save	**Déborah**; **Bruno**; 36.51% to save	**Li**; **JP**; 42.94% to save	**Matheus**; **Mari**; 56.63% to save	**Déborah**; **Bruno**; 42.69% to save	**Filipe**; **Nina**; 38.28% to save	**Renata**; **Leandro**; 47.38% to save	**Matheus**; **Mari**; 46.05% to save	**Matheus**; **Mari**; 41.79% to save	**Matheus**; **Mari**; Most votes to save	**Matheus**; **Mari**; Most votes to save	**Matheus**; **Mari**; 63.41% to win

==== Notes ====
- **^Note 1** : Déborah & Bruno and Thiago & Geórgia were tied with three votes each. Mirella & Dynho, as this week's Power Couple, had the casting vote and choose Thiago & Geórgia to be the third nominees.
- **^Note 2** : After the Couples' vote, Mirella & Dynho used their Special power to directly save one of the three nominated couples (Li & JP) and replaced them with another couple (Márcia & Rod).
- **^Note 3** : Week 1 was a non-elimination week. On elimination night, the three nominated couples competed in a challenge to determine which of the three would be the first couple nominated for Week 2. Pimpolho & Bibi lost the challenge and were permanently nominated, unless they won the next Couples' challenge, which didn't happen.
- **^Note 4** : Before the Couples' vote, Déborah & Bruno used their Special power to directly save one nominated couple (Dany & Fábio) and replaced them with another couple (Márcia & Rod).
- **^Note 5** : After the Couples' vote, Déborah & Bruno, as this week's Power Couple, had to save one couple (except Pimpolho & Bibi) from the elimination as there were four nominated couples instead of three. They choose to save Thiago & Geórgia.
- **^Note 6** : After the Couples' vote, Márcia & Rod used their Special power to transfer one vote received by Mirela Janis & Yugnir (from Déborah & Bruno) to Déborah & Bruno themselves, increasing their nominations total to six, thus making them the third nominees.
- **^Note 7** : Matheus & Mari were immune this week, due to the use of Mirella & Dynho's inheritance power after Week 3's elimination night.
- **^Note 8** : After the Couples' vote, Déborah & Bruno chose to use their Special power to directly save one of the three nominated couples, who in turn had to nominate their replacement. However, the power was cancelled by production after Déborah brought the power during her nomination speech for Li & JP, and also for her giving hints about the power to Li & JP during the commercial break, which was against the rules.
- **^Note 9** : Before the Couples' vote, Dany & Fábio used their Special power to choice a couple to have all the votes their received would be counted as two. They chose JonJon & Carol. As a result, their two nominations were doubled-up to four.
- **^Note 10** : JonJon & Carol and Li & JP were tied with four votes each. Dany & Fábio, as this week's Power Couple, had the casting vote and chose JonJon & Carol to be the third nominees.
- **^Note 11** : Filipe & Nina and Mirela Janis & Yugnir were tied with four votes each. Li & JP, as this week's Power Couple, had the casting vote and chose Mirela Janis & Yugnir to be the third nominees.
- **^Note 12** : After the Couples' vote, Li & JP used their Special power to choice a couple to be the forth nominee. They chose Matheus & Mari to be the forth nominees.
- **^Note 13** : After the Couples' vote, Thiago & Geórgia used their Special power to directly nominated a couple, who in turn had to save one of the three other nominated couples. They chose Filipe & Nina as nominated, who in turn saved Dany & Fábio.
- **^Note 14** : After the Couples' vote, Thiago & Geórgia used their Special power to cancelled all the votes received by Li & JP.
- **^Note 15** : After the Couples' vote, Li & JP used their Special power to multiply by two all the votes received by Renata & Leandro, increasing their nominations total to eight.
- **^Note 16** : After the Couples' vote, Thiago & Geórgia used their Special power to transfer one vote received by Déborah & Bruno to Matheus & Mari, increasing their nominations total to four, thus making them the third nominees.
- **^Note 17** : On week 11, the final four couples competed in the final Couples' challenge for place in the final three. Li & JP were winners and became the first semifinalist of the season. Déborah & Bruno, Matheus & Mari and Thiago & Geórgia were automatically nominated for elimination.
- **^Note 18** : From this point on, the public votes to decide who is eliminated and ultimately wins. Following Thiago & Geórgia's elimination on day 75, the final three couples were automatically nominated for the final elimination of the season.
- **^Note 19** : For the final, the public votes for the couple they want to win Power Couple Brasil 5.

=== Inheritance power ===
This season, each eliminated couple will be entitled to an "inheritance". The couple must to delegate, in advance, which couples would hold the Golden film can which will unleash good and bad consequences in the upcoming cycle, with one of the powers defined by the public through the show's profile on R7.com among two options.

Week	Eliminated Couple	Consequences
2	Medrado & Claytão	**1** This couple earned a R$5.000 bonus to bet this cycle. →**Dany & Fábio**; **2** This couple have to bet all their money in the second challenge. →**Déborah & Bruno**
3	Mirella & Dynho	**1** This couple is immune this cycle. →**Matheus & Mari**; **2** This couple loses R$10.000 of their overall bank account. →**Márcia & Rod**
4	Pimpolho & Bibi	**1** These couples won a refreshing afternoon of ice cream. →**Matheus & Mari and Mirela Janis & Yugnir**; **2** This couple is the servant of the couples who won the ice cream. →**Márcia & Rod**
5	JonJon & Carol	**1** This couple has to bet their money in the "dark" on the first challenge, without seeing the explanation or details of the challenge. →**Dany & Fábio**
6	Márcia & Rod	**1** This couple is vetoed at the next Couples' challenge. →**Li & JP**; **2** This couple wins R$5.000 of their overall bank account. →**Renata & Leandro**
7	Mirela Janis & Yugnir	**1** This couple has to bet all their money in the first challenge of the cycle. →**Déborah & Bruno**; **2** This couple has to bet R$1.000 on the first challenge of the cycle. →**Li & JP**
8	Filipe & Nina	**1** This couple exchanged the challenges of the cycle with each other. The woman is in the Men's challenge and the man is in the Women's challenge. →**Thiago & Geórgia**
9	Dany & Fábio	**1** These couples must choose the value of each other's bet in the first challenge of the cycle. →**Déborah & Bruno and Li & JP**

=== Room status ===
	Week 1	Week 2	Week 3	Week 4	Week 5	Week 6	Week 7	Week 8	Week 9	Week 10	Week 11		
	Week 1	Week 2	Week 3	Week 4	Week 5	Week 6	Week 7	Week 8	Week 9	Week 10	Day 71	Day 76	Finale
**Power** **suite**	Renata; Leandro	Mirella; Dynho	Déborah; Bruno	Márcia; Rod	Déborah; Bruno	Dany; Fábio	Li; JP	Thiago; Geórgia	Thiago; Geórgia	Li; JP	Thiago; Geórgia	Déborah; Bruno	Déborah; Bruno
**Romance** **suite**	Mirella; Dynho	Matheus; Mari	Mirella; Dynho	Mirela Janis; Yugnir	Li; JP	Renata; Leandro	Filipe; Nina	Déborah; Bruno	Dany; Fábio	Thiago; Geórgia	Li; JP	Li; JP	Matheus; Mari
**Western** **suite**	Déborah; Bruno	Déborah; Bruno	Li; JP	JonJon; Carol	Thiago; Geórgia	Matheus; Mari	Thiago; Geórgia	Renata; Leandro	Li; JP	Déborah; Bruno	Déborah; Bruno		
**Sci-fi** **suite**	Thiago; Geórgia	Pimpolho; Bibi	Thiago; Geórgia	Pimpolho; Bibi	Filipe; Nina	Mirela Janis; Yugnir	Renata; Leandro	Matheus; Mari	Renata; Leandro	Matheus; Mari			
**Animation**	Li; JP	Renata; Leandro	Márcia; Rod	Matheus; Mari	Dany; Fábio	Thiago; Geórgia	Mirela Janis; Yugnir	Filipe; Nina	Matheus; Mari				
**Comedy** **suite**	Dany; Fábio	Mirela Janis; Yugnir	Renata; Leandro	Renata; Leandro	JonJon; Carol	Márcia; Rod	Dany; Fábio	Li; JP					
**War**	JonJon; Carol	JonJon; Carol	JonJon; Carol	Dany; Fábio	Mirela Janis; Yugnir	Déborah; Bruno	Matheus; Mari						
**Adventure**	Matheus; Mari	Filipe; Nina	Filipe; Nina	Thiago; Geórgia	Renata; Leandro	Li; JP							
**Musical**	Pimpolho; Bibi	Medrado; Claytão	Mirela Janis; Yugnir	Déborah; Bruno	Matheus; Mari								
**Horror** **(Squeeze)**	Medrado; Claytão	Li; JP	Dany; Fábio	Filipe; Nina	Márcia; Rod	Filipe; Nina	Déborah; Bruno	Dany; Fábio	Déborah; Bruno	Renata; Leandro	Matheus; Mari	Matheus; Mari	
Living room	Filipe; Nina	Dany; Fábio	Matheus; Mari	Li; JP									
Living room	Mirela Janis; Yugnir	Thiago; Geórgia	Pimpolho; Bibi										
**Tent**	Márcia; Rod	Márcia; Rod											

== Ratings and reception ==
=== Brazilian ratings ===
All numbers are in points and provided by Kantar Ibope Media.

Week	First air date	Last air date	Timeslot (BRT)	Daily SP viewers (in points)							SP viewers (in points)	BR viewers (in points)	Ref.
Week	First air date	Last air date	Timeslot (BRT)	Mon	Tue	Wed	Thu	Fri	Sat	Sun	SP viewers (in points)	BR viewers (in points)	Ref.
0	May 9, 2021	May 9, 2021	Monday to Saturday; 10:30 p.m.	—	—	—	—	—	—	6.0	6.0	5.5	
1	May 10, 2021	May 15, 2021	Monday to Saturday; 10:30 p.m.	6.5	6.1	6.0	7.2	7.0	4.4	—	6.2	Outside top 10	
2	May 17, 2021	May 22, 2021	Monday to Saturday; 10:30 p.m.	6.5	6.4	6.6	6.5	7.5	4.6	—	6.4	Outside top 10	
3	May 24, 2021	May 29, 2021	Monday to Saturday; 10:30 p.m.	6.4	5.6	6.7	6.7	6.6	5.3	—	6.2	Outside top 10	
4	May 31, 2021	June 5, 2021	Monday to Saturday; 10:30 p.m.	6.2	5.8	8.0	6.6	6.2	5.1	—	6.3	5.6	
5	June 7, 2021	June 12, 2021	Monday to Saturday; 10:30 p.m.	6.3	7.1	7.7	6.5	6.8	4.9	—	6.6	5.7	
6	June 14, 2021	June 19, 2021	Monday to Saturday; 10:30 p.m.	6.1	6.5	7.8	6.6	7.5	4.7	—	6.5	Outside top 10	
7	June 21, 2021	June 26, 2021	Monday to Saturday; 10:30 p.m.	6.4	7.0	6.4	7.5	6.1	4.5	—	6.3	Outside top 10	
8	June 28, 2021	July 3, 2021	Monday to Saturday; 10:30 p.m.	7.3	6.1	7.0	6.4	4.5	5.1	—	6.1	Outside top 10	
9	July 5, 2021	July 10, 2021	Monday to Saturday; 10:30 p.m.	6.5	6.7	6.7	6.8	6.0	4.3	—	6.2	Outside top 10	
10	July 12, 2021	July 17, 2021	Monday to Saturday; 10:30 p.m.	6.2	6.7	6.6	7.3	6.5	4.7	—	6.3	Outside top 10	
11	July 19, 2021	July 23, 2021	Monday to Saturday; 10:30 p.m.	6.3	5.9	6.5	7.4	8.8	—	—	7.0	5.9	

- In 2021, each point represents 268.278 households in 15 market cities in Brazil (76.577 households in São Paulo).
