= Adriane Galisteu =

Brazilian actress and model (born 1973)

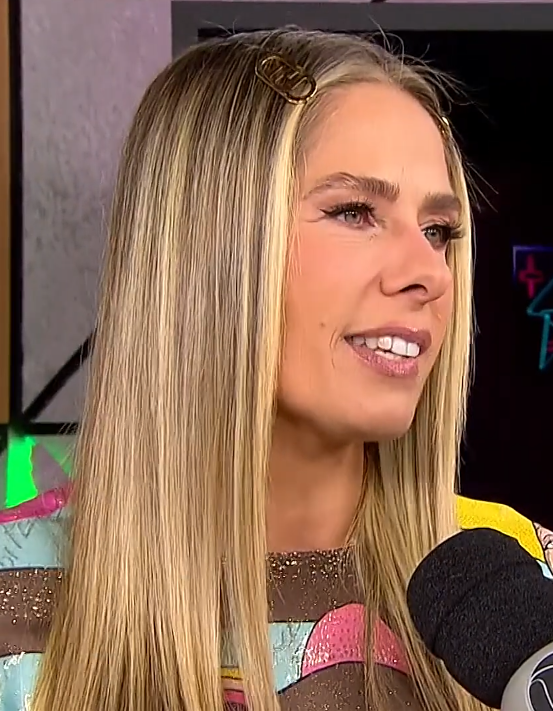
- Galisteu in 2022
- Born: Adriane Kelemen Galisteu; 18 April 1973 (age 53); São Paulo, Brazil
- Occupations: Actress; TV host
- Years active: 1987–present
- Spouses: Roberto Justus (m. 1998; div. 1999) Alexandre Iódice (m. 2010)
- Children: 1
- Website: adrianegalisteu.com.br

Signature
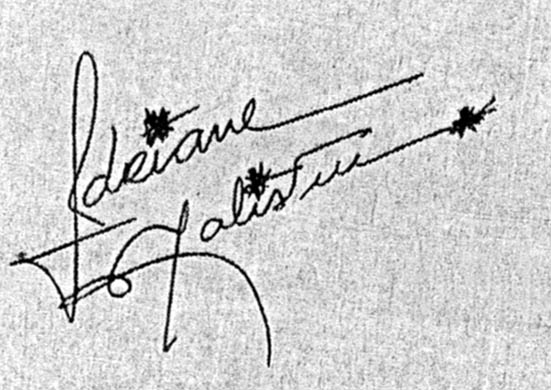

Adriane Kelemen Galisteu Iódice, better known as Adriane Galisteu (born 18 April 1973), is a Brazilian actress, TV host and former model.

== Biography ==
Galisteu was born in the city of São Paulo, daughter of Alberto Galisteu and Emma Kelemen, and lived until she was 18 years old in Lapa, a neighborhood in São Paulo. Her father's grandparents, José Galisteo and Maria Muñoz, were Spanish and arrived in Brazil in 1899 on the vessel "Les Alpes", coming from Málaga, Andalusia. Her mother is of Hungarian descent.

== Career ==
Galisteu has appeared in the Brazilian edition of Playboy magazine on a number of occasions and was a VJ for MTV Brasil.

== Personal life ==
She was the girlfriend of Formula One driver Ayrton Senna at the time of his death in a racing accident in the 1994 San Marino Grand Prix.

Since 2010, Galisteu is married to the businessman Alexandre Iódice, with whom she has a son, named Vittorio.

== Filmography ==
=== Television ===
Year	Title	Role	Notes
1995	Ponto G	Presenter	
1996	Antônio Alves, Taxista	Célia	Episodes: "6–8 May 1996"
1996	Xica da Silva	Clara Caldeira Brant	
1997	Sai de Baixo	Clone do Caco	Episode: "Se Clonar, Clonou"
1998	Fascinação	Nívea	Episode: "26 May 1998"
1998–1999	Quiz MTV	Presenter	
1999	Ô... Coitado!	Olga	
1999–2000	Superpop	Presenter	
2000–2004	É Show	Presenter	
2003	Record 50 Anos	Presenter	Year end special
2004–2008	Charme	Presenter	
2005	Fora do Ar	Presenter	
2009–2010	Toda Sexta	Presenter	
2011	Projeto Fashion	Presenter	
2012	Band Folia	Presenter	Carnival special
2012	Muito+	Presenter	
2013	Paixões Perigosas	Presenter	
2013–2014	Domingo da Gente	Special presenter	Episode: "10 November 2013"; Episode: "15 December 2013"; Episode: "16 February 2014"
2014	Quem Quer Casar com Meu Filho?	Presenter	
2014	Dormindo Com Meu Estilista	Presenter	
2015–2016	Papo de Cozinha	Presenter	
2016	Boa Noite Fox	Presenter	
2016	Fox Emotion	Presenter	
2016–2017	Face a Face	Presenter	
2017	Dança dos Famosos	Participant	Season 14
2018	O Tempo não Para	Zelda Lacocque	
2021	Tu Consegues	Judge	
2021–2022	Power Couple	Presenter	Seasons 5 and 6
2021–present	A Fazenda	Presenter	Seasons 13, 14, 15,16, 17
2024–2025	Barras Invisíveis	Herself	Docuseries
2024	Um Beijo do Gordo	Herself	Docuseries
2025	Meu Ayrton Por Adriane Galisteu	Herself	Docuseries

=== Film ===
Year	Title	Role	Notes
2005	Coisa de Mulher	Mayara	
2009	Se Eu Fosse Você 2	Marina	
2010	Senna	Herself	Documentary

=== Internet ===
Year	Title	Occupation
2016–present	Galisteu Sem Filtro	Host

== Theater ==
Year	Title	Role
1999	Deus lhe Pague	Nancy
2001	Dia das Mães	Leslie
2006	Nunca se Sábado	Ísis
2006	O Rim	Rosário
2007	Às Favas com os Escrúpulos	Brenda
2009–11	Um Casal Aberto, Ma Non Troppo	Antônia
2012	Uma Mulher do Outro Mundo	Elvira
2013	Três Dias de Chuva	Anna
2015	Mulheres Alteradas	Selma
2016–17	Troilus and Cressida	Helen of Troy
2017	A Bela Adormecida	Malévola
