= É Show =

- Genre: Variety
- Presented by: Adriane Galisteu; DJ Zé Pedro
- Country of origin: Brazil
- Original language: Portuguese

Original release
- Network: Record
- Release: October 30, 2000 – October 5, 2004

É Show was a Brazilian variety show presented by Adriane Galisteu and aired on Rede Record from October 30, 2000 to October 5, 2004.

== History and format ==
The format was conceived in order to reach out to the youth, a target Record wanted to cater more. For this end, in order to create É Show, the network conducted market research and selected Adriane Galisteu, who matched the desired profile. É Show in its initial phase was shown live on Mondays to Wednesdays, and was taped on Thursdays and Fridays. It featured musical performances, interviews and outside reports. Galisteu had left RedeTV!, where she had a similar program (Superpop), but her contract with Record was owing mostly to its larger national coverage (89% of Brazil), compared to RedeTV!, which was mostly limited to its five owned-and-operated stations. One of the segments that was already announced was Pratos Limpos, in which DJ Zé Pedro visited houses of lesser-known bands, with a visit to Fat Family's home being booked for the premiere.

The program followed the same pattern as RedeTV!'s Superpop, which was previously presented by Adriane. This phase was marked by the rivalry between É Show and Galisteu's former program, which became presented by then-model Luciana Gimenez. The two programs started competing for ratings. This phase lasted from October 30, 2000, to October 2, 2001. In an attempt to evade direct competition and to reach out to the youth, it moved to an 11pm timeslot. RedeTV! reacted by stretching Superpop to midnight, in order to regain competition between the two shows. This phase ran from October 3, 2001, to February 15, 2002. Due to changes to the schedule in order to accommodate soccer matches, the program ceased to air daily, being limited to Tuesdays and Fridays. This phase started on February 19, 2002. The program eventually moved from Fridays to Sundays in the 7-9pm slot, which was formerly occupied by No Vermelho. This new phase began on December 15, 2002, ending on January 19, 2003. This did not match up with its ratings and the program quickly returned to its previous slot. This phase ran from January 31, 2003, to July 25, 2003. Facing a new schedule change, the Friday edition exchanged slots with game show Roleta Russa, presented by Milton Neves, and moved to Thursdays, from July 31, 2003 until February 26, 2004. In its final phase, it moved back to Fridays, being speculated by Galisteu's move to SBT. This phase ran from May 5, 2004 to October 5, 2004, when it ended.

== Ratings ==
In its premiere, the program scored 6 IBOPE points, ending in third place. In the following weeks, the median score varied between 3 and 4 points, receiving its highest average yet of 8 points on February 14, 2001. In the following weeks, Superpop ended up surpassing its ratings. When it aired in the 9pm timeslot, it varied between 2 and 8 pontos, with the move to 11pm, the program initially stabilized at 5 points. In 2006, the average score of the program was of 6 points. In its last year, in 2004, facing the controversies of the refusal of continuing her contract with Record and her move to SBT, the average fell to 3 points.

== Censorship problems and cancellation ==
Record exerted acts of censorship throughout the programs existence. Some performances were vetoed by the network, such as Braga Boys, a band that had sensual coreographies. Such position caused the network to adopt a position of self-censorship. "Castigo", a song from musician Buchecha, was vetoed for featuring the sexual term "gozo", making the singer cancel his participation. "Dandalunda" by Margareth Menezes was also forbidden, for mentioning saints. In 2004, with a Gay Parade taking place in Brazil, Galisteu recorded a program with several drag queens, however, before the program went on air, the network decided to edit the footage, removing all instances of the drag queens from the final product.

Facing the indefinition regarding Adriane Galisteu leaving Record with the end of her contract in September 2004, possible replacements were mooted to front É Show. The network initially negotiated with actress Luana Piovani, with a few meetings being held to formalize a possible agreement. Another name that was on the cards was that of Daniella Cicarelli, which at the time was living her last phase at MTV. Then-model Ana Hickmann was also one of the suggested presenters. She did sign a contract with the network, however she ended up on another program, the daytime talk show Tudo a Ver.

== Later developments ==
As late as May 2017, Record continued to renew the usage of the É Show trademark, without even announcing plans for a revival. Netizens speculated a potential presenter for the revival, Sérgio Marone, who at the time was presenting Dancing Brasil with Xuxa.
