= Projeto Fashion =

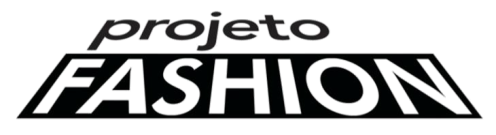
- Genre: Reality competition
- Created by: Eli Holzman
- Starring: Adriane Galisteu; Alexandre Herchcovitch; Susana Barbosa; Reinaldo Lourenço
- Country of origin: Brazil
- No. of seasons: 1
- No. of episodes: 14

Production
- Running time: 90 minutes

Original release
- Network: Band
- Release: September 17 – December 17, 2011

Projeto Fashion was a Brazilian reality television show based on the American program Project Runway, wherein fashion designers compete by making specific garments for weekly challenges. The show features Adriane Galisteu as the host, and Susana Barbosa and Reinaldo Lourenço as judges. Alexandre Herchcovitch acts as a mentor to the contestants, as Tim Gunn does in the American version.

The winner of Projeto Fashion receives R$100,000 to start his own line, a new car and an editorial feature in the Brazilian edition of Elle magazine.

The series premiered on Saturday, September 17, 2011, at 10:30 p.m. on Band. On December 17, Cynthia Hayashi won the competition over Helena Wen and Talita Lima, who took second and third place respectively.

On December 12, 2011, it was confirmed that the series had been canceled and would not be returning for a second season.

== Series overview ==
=== Seasons ===
Season	Premiere date	Finale date	No. of designers	Winner	Runner-up	2nd runner-up	Prizes
1	September 17, 2011	December 17, 2011	12	Cynthia Hayashi	Helena Wen	Talita Lima	R$100,000 to start his own line; A new car; An editorial feature in Elle magazine

== Designers ==
Contestant	Age	Hometown	Place finished
Micheline Pimenta	21	São Paulo	12th
Helen Salles	23	São Paulo	11th
Luis Serafim	25	Joinville	10th
Tarcísio Almeida	25	Salvador	9th
Luiz Pita	39	Cuiabá	8th
Raphael Ribeiro	25	Belo Horizonte	7th
Adriana Póe	24	Bertioga	6th
Weslley Alegretti	21	São Paulo	5th
Acácio Mendes	22	Guarapuava	4th
Talita Lima	24	São Paulo	3rd
Helena Wen	24	Vitória	Runner-up
Cynthia Hayashi	23	Guarulhos	Winner

== Designer progress ==
Elimination table
Designers	1	2	3	4	5	6	7	8–9	10	11	12	13	14
Cynthia	HIGH	IN	HIGH	HIGH	IN	LOW	LOW	HIGH	WIN	LOW	WIN	LOW	WINNER
Helena	IN	HIGH	HIGH	OUT				WIN	HIGH	HIGH	HIGH	HIGH	RUNNER-UP
Talita	HIGH	LOW	WIN	LOW	HIGH	HIGH	IN	WIN	LOW	LOW	HIGH	WIN	3RD PLACE
Acácio	IN	WIN	IN	IN	WIN	LOW	HIGH	HIGH	HIGH	WIN	HIGH	OUT	
Weslley	LOW	IN	IN	LOW	HIGH	HIGH	WIN	LOW	LOW	OUT			
Adriana	IN	IN	LOW	IN	IN	HIGH	LOW	HIGH	OUT				
Raphael	LOW	LOW	IN	WIN	LOW	LOW	HIGH	OUT					
Luiz Pita	WIN	IN	IN	HIGH	LOW	HIGH	OUT	OUT					
Tarcísio	IN	IN	LOW	IN	LOW	OUT		OUT					
Luis Serafim	IN	HIGH	OUT					OUT					
Helen	IN	OUT						OUT					
Micheline	OUT							OUT					

=== Key ===
Winner	Runner-up	Challenge winner	Challenge runner-up
Challenge top entire	Saved first	Saved last	Eliminated
