= A Fazenda 13 =

- Season 13
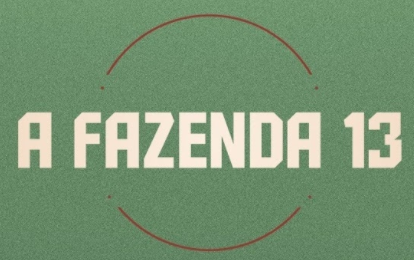
- Hosted by: Adriane Galisteu
- No. of days: 96
- No. of contestants: 22
- Winner: Rico Melquiades
- Runner-up: Bil Araújo
- Companion show: A Fazenda Online
- No. of episodes: 94

Release
- Original network: RecordTV
- Original release: September 14 – December 16, 2021

Season chronology
- ← Previous; Season 12 Next → Season 14

A Fazenda 13 (Note: also taglined as A Fazenda 13: Um Celeiro de Lendas (English: The Farm 13: A Barn of Legends)) was the thirteenth season of the Brazilian reality television series A Fazenda, which premiered Tuesday, September 14, 2021, at 10:30 / 9:30 p.m. (BRT / AMT) on RecordTV, following a sneak peek episode that aired on September 13.

On December 16, 2021, digital influencer Rico Melquiades won the competition with 77.47% of the public vote over personal trainer Bil Araújo (18.83%), writer Solange Gomes (3.70%) and digital influencer Marina Ferrari (2.77%).

== Overview ==
=== Development ===
Adriane Galisteu replaced Marcos Mion as the main host, thus becoming the show's first female host. Lidi Lisboa and Lucas Selfie replaced Victor Sarro as the show's online hosts and correspondents.

Like the previous season, the contestants moved into the Farm on Sunday, September 12, 2021, two days before the season premiere.

== Contestants ==
The first seven celebrities were officially revealed by RecordTV on September 9. They were: Victor Pecoraro, Mussunzinho, Liziane Gutierrez, Nego do Borel, Tati Quebra-Barraco, Bil Araújo and Mileide Mihaile. On September 10, two more celebrities were announced: Dayane Mello and Valentina Francavilla. Medrado, Gui Araujo and Marina Ferrari were unveiled on September 11–13, through the show's profile on TikTok. On September 13, another two celebrities were also confirmed: MC Gui and Tiago Piquilo. Solange Gomes and Rico Melquiades were the last two celebrities announced in advance on September 14. The final four contestants (Aline Mineiro, Dynho Alves, Erasmo Viana and Erika Schneider) who completed the season's full lineup of celebrities were only confirmed during the season premiere. On September 17, Sthe Matos was chosen by the public as the 21st and final contestant of the season due to the Warehouse twist. Following Medrado's walking from the game, Lary Bottino was revealed as her replacement on September 29, 2021.

Contestant	Age	Background	Hometown	Entered	Exited	Status	Finish
Medrado	28	Rapper	Guarulhos	Day 1	Day 12	Walked on September 23, 2021	22nd
Liziane Gutierrez	35	Model	Rio de Janeiro	Day 1	Day 12	Eliminated 1st on September 23, 2021	21st
Nego do Borel	29	Musician	Rio de Janeiro	Day 1	Day 14	Ejected on September 25, 2021	20th
Mussunzinho	28	Actor	Rio de Janeiro	Day 1	Day 19	Eliminated 2nd on September 30, 2021	19th
Erika Schneider	30	Dancer	Recife	Day 1	Day 26	Eliminated 3rd on October 7, 2021	18th
Victor Pecoraro	43	Actor	São Caetano do Sul	Day 1	Day 33	Eliminated 4th on October 14, 2021	17th
Lary Bottino	23	Digital influencer	Rio de Janeiro	Day 20	Day 40	Eliminated 5th on October 21, 2021	16th
Tati Quebra Barraco	41	Singer	Rio de Janeiro	Day 1	Day 47	Eliminated 6th on October 28, 2021	15th
Erasmo Viana	36	Model	Salvador	Day 1	Day 54	Eliminated 7th on November 4, 2021	14th
Tiago Piquilo	37	Singer	Fartura	Day 1	Day 61	Eliminated 8th on November 11, 2021	13th
Valentina Francavilla	41	Comedian	Rome, Italy	Day 1	Day 68	Eliminated 9th on November 18, 2021	12th
Gui Araujo	33	Digital influencer	São Paulo	Day 1	Day 75	Eliminated 10th on November 25, 2021	11th
Dayane Mello	32	Model	Joinville	Day 1	Day 82	Eliminated 11th on December 2, 2021	10th
Mileide Mihaile	32	Digital influencer	Imperatriz	Day 1	Day 89	Eliminated 12th on December 9, 2021	9th
MC Gui	23	Singer	São Paulo	Day 1	Day 93	Eliminated 13th on December 13, 2021	8th/7th
Aline Mineiro	29	Actress	São Paulo	Day 1	Day 93	Eliminated 14th on December 13, 2021	8th/7th
Dynho Alves	26	Singer	Ponta Porã	Day 1	Day 94	Eliminated 15th on December 14, 2021	6th/5th
Sthe Matos	21	Digital influencer	Salvador	Day 6	Day 94	Eliminated 16th on December 14, 2021	6th/5th
Marina Ferrari	28	Digital influencer	Maceió	Day 1	Day 96	Fourth place on December 16, 2021	4th
Solange Gomes	47	Writer	Rio de Janeiro	Day 1	Day 96	Third place on December 16, 2021	3rd
Bil Araújo	29	Personal trainer	Vila Velha	Day 1	Day 96	Runner-up on December 16, 2021	2nd
Rico Melquiades	30	Digital influencer	Maceió	Day 1	Day 96	Winner on December 16, 2021	1st

== Future Appearances ==
After this season, in 2022, Mussunzinho appeared with his wife Karol Menezes in Power Couple Brasil 6, they finished as runner-up from the competition.

After this season, in 2022, Solange Gomes appeared in Ilha Record 2, she finished in 5th place in the competition.

In 2023, Lary Bottino and Medrado appeared on A Grande Conquista 1, they have to compete for a place to enter in the mansion. Lary didn't enter, while Medrado won her place in the mansion and finished the game in 13th place.

In 2023, Aline Mineiro appeared on De Férias com o Ex Caribe: Salseiro VIP 2 as original cast member.

In 2024, Liziane Gutierrez appeared on A Grande Conquista 2, she have to compete for a place to enter in the game, Liziane won her place in the mansion and finished the game in 11th place.

In 2025, Victor Pecoraro appeared with his wife Rayanne Morais in Power Couple Brasil 7, they finished in 3rd place in the competition.

== The game ==
=== The Warehouse ===
On Day 2, four additional contestants (all TikTok influencers) entered the Warehouse where the public voted for one of them to move into the main House on Day 6.

Contestant	Age	Background	Hometown	Entered	Exited	Status	Finish
**Alisson Jordan**	28	Dancer	Porto Velho	Day 2	Day 6	Not Selected on September 17, 2021	4th
**Mah Tavares**	19	Digital influencer & artist	Indaiatuba	Day 2	Day 6	Not Selected on September 17, 2021	3rd
**Krawk**	24	Rapper	Itaueira	Day 2	Day 6	Not Selected on September 17, 2021	2nd
**Sthe Matos**	21	Digital influencer	Salvador	Day 2	Day 6	Selected on September 17, 2021	1st

=== Fire challenge ===
This season, three or more contestants (determined by a random draw) compete in the Fire challenge to win the Lamp power. The Lamp power entitles the holder two flames, red and yellow, which may unleash good or bad consequences on the nomination process, with the red flame power defined by the public through the show's profile on TikTok among two options.

The winner chooses a flame for himself and delegates which contestant holds the other. The Flame holder's choice is marked in bold.

Week		Players	Winner	Sent to the Stall	Consequences
1	Day 1	(none)		Dayane, Dynho, Mussunzinho, Nego, Solange, Victor (most votes from the House)	All contestants in the Stall are banned from competing in the first Farmer challenge.
1	Day 8	Bil	Bil	~~**Dayane**~~, **Tiago**, MC Gui, ~~Liziane~~, Nego, Solange	Bil: The holder must choose between winning immunity or **winning R$10.000**.; Victor: The holder must swap two contestants in the Stall for another two contestants in the House → **Dayane** & **Liziane** for **Nego** & **Solange**.
1	Day 8	Dayane	Bil	~~**Dayane**~~, **Tiago**, MC Gui, ~~Liziane~~, Nego, Solange	Bil: The holder must choose between winning immunity or **winning R$10.000**.; Victor: The holder must swap two contestants in the Stall for another two contestants in the House → **Dayane** & **Liziane** for **Nego** & **Solange**.
1	Day 8	Tiago	Bil	~~**Dayane**~~, **Tiago**, MC Gui, ~~Liziane~~, Nego, Solange	Bil: The holder must choose between winning immunity or **winning R$10.000**.; Victor: The holder must swap two contestants in the Stall for another two contestants in the House → **Dayane** & **Liziane** for **Nego** & **Solange**.
2		Marina	Rico	**Marina**, **Sthe**, **Victor**, Dayane	Rico: The holder must pass all the votes that any contestant received (**Rico**) to another contestant (**Bil**).; Marina: The holder must ban one nominee from competing in the Farmer challenge → **Mussunzinho**.
2		Rico	Rico	**Marina**, **Sthe**, **Victor**, Dayane	Rico: The holder must pass all the votes that any contestant received (**Rico**) to another contestant (**Bil**).; Marina: The holder must ban one nominee from competing in the Farmer challenge → **Mussunzinho**.
2		Sthe	Rico	**Marina**, **Sthe**, **Victor**, Dayane	Rico: The holder must pass all the votes that any contestant received (**Rico**) to another contestant (**Bil**).; Marina: The holder must ban one nominee from competing in the Farmer challenge → **Mussunzinho**.
2		Victor	Rico	**Marina**, **Sthe**, **Victor**, Dayane	Rico: The holder must pass all the votes that any contestant received (**Rico**) to another contestant (**Bil**).; Marina: The holder must ban one nominee from competing in the Farmer challenge → **Mussunzinho**.
3		Aline	Mileide	**Aline**, **Tiago**, Victor, Rico	Mileide: The holder must choose between immunity from the Farmer's vote or from the **House's vote**.; Bil: The holder must choose any contestant to be the fourth nominee → **Dayane**.
3		Mileide	Mileide	**Aline**, **Tiago**, Victor, Rico	Mileide: The holder must choose between immunity from the Farmer's vote or from the **House's vote**.; Bil: The holder must choose any contestant to be the fourth nominee → **Dayane**.
3		Tiago	Mileide	**Aline**, **Tiago**, Victor, Rico	Mileide: The holder must choose between immunity from the Farmer's vote or from the **House's vote**.; Bil: The holder must choose any contestant to be the fourth nominee → **Dayane**.
4		Bil	Bil	**Dynho**, **Victor**, Solange, Erasmo	Bil: The holder is immune this week and must choose another contestant to also receive immunity → **Dynho**.; Gui Araujo: The holder's vote will be counted as two.
4		Dynho	Bil	**Dynho**, **Victor**, Solange, Erasmo	Bil: The holder is immune this week and must choose another contestant to also receive immunity → **Dynho**.; Gui Araujo: The holder's vote will be counted as two.
4		Victor	Bil	**Dynho**, **Victor**, Solange, Erasmo	Bil: The holder is immune this week and must choose another contestant to also receive immunity → **Dynho**.; Gui Araujo: The holder's vote will be counted as two.
5		Erasmo	Tiago	**Erasmo**, **MC Gui**, **Solange**, **Valentina**	Tiago: The holder wins R$10.000 if he punishes the House with 48 hours without coffee → **offer accepted**.; MC Gui: The holder must cancel the votes of five contestants → **Bil**, **Dynho**, **Gui Araujo**, **Lary**, **Marina**.
5		MC Gui	Tiago	**Erasmo**, **MC Gui**, **Solange**, **Valentina**	Tiago: The holder wins R$10.000 if he punishes the House with 48 hours without coffee → **offer accepted**.; MC Gui: The holder must cancel the votes of five contestants → **Bil**, **Dynho**, **Gui Araujo**, **Lary**, **Marina**.
5		Solange	Tiago	**Erasmo**, **MC Gui**, **Solange**, **Valentina**	Tiago: The holder wins R$10.000 if he punishes the House with 48 hours without coffee → **offer accepted**.; MC Gui: The holder must cancel the votes of five contestants → **Bil**, **Dynho**, **Gui Araujo**, **Lary**, **Marina**.
5		Tiago	Tiago	**Erasmo**, **MC Gui**, **Solange**, **Valentina**	Tiago: The holder wins R$10.000 if he punishes the House with 48 hours without coffee → **offer accepted**.; MC Gui: The holder must cancel the votes of five contestants → **Bil**, **Dynho**, **Gui Araujo**, **Lary**, **Marina**.
5		Valentina	Tiago	**Erasmo**, **MC Gui**, **Solange**, **Valentina**	Tiago: The holder wins R$10.000 if he punishes the House with 48 hours without coffee → **offer accepted**.; MC Gui: The holder must cancel the votes of five contestants → **Bil**, **Dynho**, **Gui Araujo**, **Lary**, **Marina**.
6		Dayane	Gui Araujo	**Dayane**, **Marina**, **Sthe**, Tati	Gui Araujo: The holder must double the total of votes any contestant received → **Solange**.; Dynho: The holder must swap the nominee banned from the Farmer's challenge for another nominee → **MC Gui** for **Rico**.
6		Gui Araujo	Gui Araujo	**Dayane**, **Marina**, **Sthe**, Tati	Gui Araujo: The holder must double the total of votes any contestant received → **Solange**.; Dynho: The holder must swap the nominee banned from the Farmer's challenge for another nominee → **MC Gui** for **Rico**.
6		Marina	Gui Araujo	**Dayane**, **Marina**, **Sthe**, Tati	Gui Araujo: The holder must double the total of votes any contestant received → **Solange**.; Dynho: The holder must swap the nominee banned from the Farmer's challenge for another nominee → **MC Gui** for **Rico**.
6		Sthe	Gui Araujo	**Dayane**, **Marina**, **Sthe**, Tati	Gui Araujo: The holder must double the total of votes any contestant received → **Solange**.; Dynho: The holder must swap the nominee banned from the Farmer's challenge for another nominee → **MC Gui** for **Rico**.
7		Mileide	Tiago	~~**Mileide**~~, ~~**Solange**~~, ~~Dayane~~, ~~Dynho~~; Bil, Erasmo, Gui Araujo, Marina	Tiago: The holder must giving immunity to three contestants from the Save Chain, including himself → **Aline**, **Tiago**, **Valentina**.; Erasmo: The holder must swap all contestants in the Stall for another four contestants in the House → **Bil**, **Erasmo**, **Gui Araujo**, **Marina**.
7		Solange	Tiago	~~**Mileide**~~, ~~**Solange**~~, ~~Dayane~~, ~~Dynho~~; Bil, Erasmo, Gui Araujo, Marina	Tiago: The holder must giving immunity to three contestants from the Save Chain, including himself → **Aline**, **Tiago**, **Valentina**.; Erasmo: The holder must swap all contestants in the Stall for another four contestants in the House → **Bil**, **Erasmo**, **Gui Araujo**, **Marina**.
7		Tiago	Tiago	~~**Mileide**~~, ~~**Solange**~~, ~~Dayane~~, ~~Dynho~~; Bil, Erasmo, Gui Araujo, Marina	Tiago: The holder must giving immunity to three contestants from the Save Chain, including himself → **Aline**, **Tiago**, **Valentina**.; Erasmo: The holder must swap all contestants in the Stall for another four contestants in the House → **Bil**, **Erasmo**, **Gui Araujo**, **Marina**.
8		Bil	Rico	**Bil**, **Gui Araujo**, Tiago, Dynho	Rico: The holder is immune this week and must choose another contestant to receive immunity from the House's vote → **Mileide**.; Aline: The holder must choose between **winning R$5.000 and mainteining the Save Chain** or winning R$10.000 and choosing the fourth nominee.
8		Gui Araujo	Rico	**Bil**, **Gui Araujo**, Tiago, Dynho	Rico: The holder is immune this week and must choose another contestant to receive immunity from the House's vote → **Mileide**.; Aline: The holder must choose between **winning R$5.000 and mainteining the Save Chain** or winning R$10.000 and choosing the fourth nominee.
8		Rico	Rico	**Bil**, **Gui Araujo**, Tiago, Dynho	Rico: The holder is immune this week and must choose another contestant to receive immunity from the House's vote → **Mileide**.; Aline: The holder must choose between **winning R$5.000 and mainteining the Save Chain** or winning R$10.000 and choosing the fourth nominee.
9		Dynho	Dynho	**Marina**, **Solange**, Dayane, MC Gui	Dynho: The holder must swap one nominee (except the Farmer's) for a contestant in the House → **Dayane** for **Valentina**.; MC Gui: The holder must choose a nominee that cannot be banned from the Farmer challenge → **Valentina**.
9		Marina	Dynho	**Marina**, **Solange**, Dayane, MC Gui	Dynho: The holder must swap one nominee (except the Farmer's) for a contestant in the House → **Dayane** for **Valentina**.; MC Gui: The holder must choose a nominee that cannot be banned from the Farmer challenge → **Valentina**.
9		Solange	Dynho	**Marina**, **Solange**, Dayane, MC Gui	Dynho: The holder must swap one nominee (except the Farmer's) for a contestant in the House → **Dayane** for **Valentina**.; MC Gui: The holder must choose a nominee that cannot be banned from the Farmer challenge → **Valentina**.
10		Aline	Aline	**Bil**, **Mileide**, Dayane, Dynho	Aline: The holder must choose between canceling every vote someone received or **giving immunity to two contestants from the Save Chain, including herself** → **Aline**, **Solange**.; Marina: The holder must choose three contestants (**Dayane**, **Dynho**, **Sthe**). The second nominee must choose which one is the third nominee.
10		Bil	Aline	**Bil**, **Mileide**, Dayane, Dynho	Aline: The holder must choose between canceling every vote someone received or **giving immunity to two contestants from the Save Chain, including herself** → **Aline**, **Solange**.; Marina: The holder must choose three contestants (**Dayane**, **Dynho**, **Sthe**). The second nominee must choose which one is the third nominee.
10		Mileide	Aline	**Bil**, **Mileide**, Dayane, Dynho	Aline: The holder must choose between canceling every vote someone received or **giving immunity to two contestants from the Save Chain, including herself** → **Aline**, **Solange**.; Marina: The holder must choose three contestants (**Dayane**, **Dynho**, **Sthe**). The second nominee must choose which one is the third nominee.
11		Dayane	Dynho	**Dayane**, **Solange**, Marina	Dynho: The holder is immune this week if he punishes the House with 72 hours without running water → **offer accepted**.; Sthe: The holder must choose two contestants (**Aline**, **Marina**). A new vote decides which one is the fourth nominee.
11		Dynho	Dynho	**Dayane**, **Solange**, Marina	Dynho: The holder is immune this week if he punishes the House with 72 hours without running water → **offer accepted**.; Sthe: The holder must choose two contestants (**Aline**, **Marina**). A new vote decides which one is the fourth nominee.
11		Solange	Dynho	**Dayane**, **Solange**, Marina	Dynho: The holder is immune this week if he punishes the House with 72 hours without running water → **offer accepted**.; Sthe: The holder must choose two contestants (**Aline**, **Marina**). A new vote decides which one is the fourth nominee.
12		Aline	Sthe	Aline, Marina, Solange	Sthe: The holder must choose between **winning immunity** or winning R$10.000.; Dynho: The holder must swap one nominee (except the Farmer's) for another contestant → **Bil** for **Mileide**.
12		Bil	Sthe	Aline, Marina, Solange	Sthe: The holder must choose between **winning immunity** or winning R$10.000.; Dynho: The holder must swap one nominee (except the Farmer's) for another contestant → **Bil** for **Mileide**.
12		Dynho	Sthe	Aline, Marina, Solange	Sthe: The holder must choose between **winning immunity** or winning R$10.000.; Dynho: The holder must swap one nominee (except the Farmer's) for another contestant → **Bil** for **Mileide**.
12		Marina	Sthe	Aline, Marina, Solange	Sthe: The holder must choose between **winning immunity** or winning R$10.000.; Dynho: The holder must swap one nominee (except the Farmer's) for another contestant → **Bil** for **Mileide**.
12		MC Gui	Sthe	Aline, Marina, Solange	Sthe: The holder must choose between **winning immunity** or winning R$10.000.; Dynho: The holder must swap one nominee (except the Farmer's) for another contestant → **Bil** for **Mileide**.
12		Mileide	Sthe	Aline, Marina, Solange	Sthe: The holder must choose between **winning immunity** or winning R$10.000.; Dynho: The holder must swap one nominee (except the Farmer's) for another contestant → **Bil** for **Mileide**.
12		Solange	Sthe	Aline, Marina, Solange	Sthe: The holder must choose between **winning immunity** or winning R$10.000.; Dynho: The holder must swap one nominee (except the Farmer's) for another contestant → **Bil** for **Mileide**.
12		Sthe	Sthe	Aline, Marina, Solange	Sthe: The holder must choose between **winning immunity** or winning R$10.000.; Dynho: The holder must swap one nominee (except the Farmer's) for another contestant → **Bil** for **Mileide**.

=== Obligations ===
	Week 1	Week 2	Week 3	Week 4	Week 5	Week 6	Week 7	Week 8	Week 9	Week 10	Week 11	Week 12	Week 13
Farmer of the week	**Gui Araujo**	**Erika**	**Gui Araujo**	**Rico**	**Dayane**	**Bil**	**Sthe**	**Marina**	**Gui Araujo**	**Rico**	**MC Gui**	**Rico**	**Dynho**
Cows	Liziane; MC Gui	Bil; Tiago	Aline; Erika	Erasmo; Victor	Gui Araujo; Rico	Dynho; Mileide	Dayane; Solange	Sthe; Valentina	Bil; Marina	Gui Araujo; Mileide	Aline; Rico	Dynho; Sthe	Marina; Rico
Horse	Medrado	Erasmo	Marina	Solange	Tiago	Gui Araujo	Bil	MC Gui	Rico	Aline	Dynho	MC Gui	Sthe
Horn Cow	Erasmo	Aline	Rico	Gui Araujo	Bil	MC Gui	Mileide	Tiago	Dayane	Dynho	Sthe	Aline	MC Gui
Sheep	Rico	Marina	Mileide	Tati	Sthe	Erasmo	Dynho	Aline	MC Gui	Solange	~~Gui Araujo~~; Marina	~~Dayane~~; Rico	Bil
Pigs	Aline	Dynho	MC Gui	Lary	Solange	Tiago	Marina	Gui Araujo	Sthe	Bil	Dayane	Mileide	Solange
Garden Plants	Tiago	Mussunzinho	Erasmo	Marina	MC Gui	Dayane	Gui Araujo	Dynho	Aline	~~Valentina~~; Dayane	Mileide	Bil	Rico
Birds	Valentina	Victor	Bil	MC Gui	Erasmo	Marina	Aline	Mileide	Dynho	Sthe	Solange	Marina	Aline
Trash	Bil	Dayane	Dynho	Aline	Lary	Sthe	Erasmo	Rico	Mileide	Marina	Bil	Solange	~~Mileide~~; Rico

=== Voting history ===
	Week 1		Week 2	Week 3	Week 4	Week 5	Week 6	Week 7	Week 8	Week 9	Week 10	Week 11	Week 12	Week 13		
	Day 3	Day 10	Week 2	Week 3	Week 4	Week 5	Week 6	Week 7	Week 8	Week 9	Week 10	Week 11	Week 12	Day 92		Finale
Farmer of the week	(none)	Gui Araujo	Erika	Gui Araujo	Rico	Dayane	Bil	Sthe	Marina	Gui Araujo	Rico	MC Gui	Rico	Dynho		(none)
Nomination (Farmer)	(none)	Nego	Mussunzinho	Rico	Gui Araujo	Bil	MC Gui	Rico	Dayane	Aline	MC Gui	Solange	Dynho	(none)		(none)
Nomination (House)	(none)	Liziane	Bil	Erika	Aline	Gui Araujo	Rico	Solange	Sthe	Rico	Gui Araujo	Rico	~~Bil~~; Mileide	(none)		(none)
Nomination (Stall)	(none)	Solange	Dayane	Tiago	Victor	Valentina	Tati	Erasmo	Tiago	~~Dayane~~; Valentina	Dayane	Dayane	Aline	(none)		(none)
Nomination (Twist)	(none)	Erika	Gui Araujo	Dayane	Dayane	Lary	Sthe	Marina	Gui Araujo	Solange	Bil	Marina	Solange	Aline; Bil; Marina; MC Gui	Dynho; Rico; Solange; Sthe	(none)
Rico	Not eligible	Medrado	Erasmo	MC Gui	Farmer of the week	Gui Araujo	Erasmo	Dynho	Sthe	Dynho	Gui Araujo	Sthe	Farmer of the week	Not eligible	Nominee	**Winner** (Day 96)
Rico	Not eligible	Medrado	Erasmo	MC Gui	Farmer of the week	Gui Araujo	Erasmo	Dynho	Sthe	Dynho	Gui Araujo	Aline	Farmer of the week	Not eligible	Nominee	**Winner** (Day 96)
Bil	Not eligible	Valentina	~~Rico~~; Bil	MC Gui	Aline	~~Rico~~	Rico	Dayane	Valentina	Rico	Gui Araujo	Rico	MC Gui	Nominee	Not eligible	**Runner-up** (Day 96)
Bil	Not eligible	Valentina	~~Rico~~; Bil	MC Gui	Aline	~~Rico~~	Rico	Dayane	Valentina	Rico	Gui Araujo	Aline	MC Gui	Nominee	Not eligible	**Runner-up** (Day 96)
Solange	Not eligible	Bil	Valentina	Erika	Marina	Sthe	Erasmo	Dynho	Sthe	Valentina	Gui Araujo	Sthe	MC Gui	Not eligible	Nominee	**Third place** (Day 96)
Solange	Not eligible	Bil	Valentina	Erika	Marina	Sthe	Erasmo	Dynho	Sthe	Valentina	Gui Araujo	Marina	MC Gui	Not eligible	Nominee	**Third place** (Day 96)
Marina	Not eligible	Liziane	Erasmo	Solange	Dayane	~~Rico~~	Rico	Dayane	Farmer of the week	Dynho	Gui Araujo	Sthe	MC Gui	Nominee	Not eligible	**Fourth place** (Day 96)
Marina	Not eligible	Liziane	Erasmo	Solange	Dayane	~~Rico~~	Rico	Dayane	Farmer of the week	Dynho	Gui Araujo	Aline	MC Gui	Nominee	Not eligible	**Fourth place** (Day 96)
Sthe	Warehouse	Liziane	Tiago	Erasmo	Aline	Tiago	Erasmo	Solange	Solange	Rico	Solange	Rico	Bil	Not eligible	Nominee	Evicted (Day 94)
Sthe	Warehouse	Liziane	Tiago	Erasmo	Aline	Tiago	Erasmo	Solange	Solange	Rico	Solange	Marina	Bil	Not eligible	Nominee	Evicted (Day 94)
Dynho	Not eligible	Dayane	Aline	Erika	Dayane	~~Rico~~	Solange (x2)	Solange	Solange	Rico	Solange	Rico	Mileide	Not eligible	Rico; Solange; Sthe	Evicted (Day 94)
Dynho	Not eligible	Dayane	Aline	Erika	Dayane	~~Rico~~	Solange (x2)	Solange	Solange	Rico	Solange	Marina	Mileide	Not eligible	Rico; Solange; Sthe	Evicted (Day 94)
Aline	Not eligible	Dynho	Erasmo	Dynho	Lary	Gui Araujo	Dynho	Dynho	Sthe	Dynho (x2)	Gui Araujo	Sthe	Bil	Nominee	Evicted (Day 93)	
Aline	Not eligible	Dynho	Erasmo	Dynho	Lary	Gui Araujo	Dynho	Dynho	Sthe	Dynho (x2)	Gui Araujo	Marina	Bil	Nominee	Evicted (Day 93)	
MC Gui	Not eligible	Dayane	~~Rico~~; Bil	Erika	Dayane	Rico	Rico	Solange	Solange	Rico	Solange	Farmer of the week	Bil	Marina; Bil; Aline	Evicted (Day 93)	
Mileide	Not eligible	Liziane	~~Rico~~; Bil	Solange	Aline	Aline	Tiago	Solange	Solange	Valentina	Gui Araujo	Rico	Bil	Evicted (Day 89)		
Mileide	Not eligible	Liziane	~~Rico~~; Bil	Solange	Aline	Aline	Tiago	Solange	Solange	Valentina	Gui Araujo	Aline	Bil	Evicted (Day 89)		
Dayane	Not eligible	Mussunzinho	Bil	Bil	Lary	Farmer of the week	Dynho	Dynho	Sthe	Rico	Solange	Rico	Evicted (Day 82)			
Dayane	Not eligible	Mussunzinho	Bil	Bil	Lary	Farmer of the week	Dynho	Dynho	Sthe	Rico	Solange	Marina	Evicted (Day 82)			
Gui Araujo	Not eligible	Liziane	Erasmo	Farmer of the week	Aline (x2)	~~Rico~~	Solange (x2)	Solange	Valentina	Farmer of the week	Solange	Evicted (Day 75)				
Valentina	Not eligible	Bil	MC Gui	Bil	Mileide	Gui Araujo	Gui Araujo	Dynho	Sthe	Rico	Evicted (Day 68)					
Tiago	Not eligible	Erika	~~Rico~~; Bil	Erika	Dayane	Sthe	Mileide	Mileide	Sthe	Evicted (Day 61)						
Erasmo	Not eligible	Tati	Aline	Erika	Sthe	Marina	Rico	Solange	Evicted (Day 54)							
Tati	Not eligible	Erasmo	~~Rico~~; Bil	Erika	Aline	Rico	Rico	Evicted (Day 47)								
Lary	Not in house			Erika	Aline	~~Aline~~	Evicted (Day 40)									
Victor	Not eligible	Dayane	~~Rico~~; Bil	MC Gui	Valentina	Evicted (Day 33)										
Erika	Not eligible	Liziane	Farmer of the week	MC Gui	Evicted (Day 26)											
Mussunzinho	Not eligible	Dayane	~~Rico~~; Bil	Evicted (Day 19)												
Nego	Not eligible	Medrado	Ejected (Day 14)													
Liziane	Not eligible	Mileide	Evicted (Day 12)													
Medrado	Not eligible	Rico	Walked (Day 12)													
Krawk	Warehouse	Evicted (Day 6)														
Mah	Warehouse	Evicted (Day 6)														
Alisson	Warehouse	Evicted (Day 6)														
Notes	1	1, 2, 3, 4, 5	6, 7, 8, 9	10, 11	12, 13, 14	15, 16	17, 18, 19, 20	21, 22, 23	24, 25	26, 27, 28, 29	30, 31, 32, 33	34, 35	36, 37, 38, 39	40		41
Up for nomination	(none)	Nego; Liziane; Solange; Erika	Mussunzinho; Bil; Dayane; Gui Araujo	Rico; Erika; Tiago; Dayane	Gui Araujo; Aline; Victor; Dayane	Bil; Gui Araujo; Valentina; Lary	MC Gui; Rico; Tati; Sthe	Rico; Solange; Erasmo; Marina	Dayane; Sthe; Tiago; Gui Araujo	Aline; Rico; Valentina; Solange	MC Gui; Gui Araujo; Dayane; Bil	Solange; Rico; Dayane; Marina	Dynho; Mileide; Aline; Solange	(none)		
Farmer winner	(none)	Erika	Gui Araujo	Rico	Dayane	Bil	Sthe	Marina	Gui Araujo	Rico	MC Gui	Rico	Dynho	(none)		
Nominated for eviction	Alisson; Krawk; Mah; Sthe	Liziane; Nego; Solange	Bil; Dayane; Mussunzinho	Dayane; Erika; Tiago	Aline; Gui Araujo; Victor	Gui Araujo; Lary; Valentina	MC Gui; Rico; Tati	Erasmo; Rico; Solange	Dayane; Sthe; Tiago	Aline; Solange; Valentina	Bil; Dayane; Gui Araujo	Dayane; Marina; Solange	Aline; Mileide; Solange	Aline; Bil; Marina; MC Gui	Dynho; Rico; Solange; Sthe	Bil; Marina; Rico; Solange
Walked	(none)	**Medrado**	(none)													
Ejected	(none)		**Nego**	(none)												
Evicted	**Alisson**; 3.71% to enter	**Liziane**; 26.15% to save	**Mussunzinho**; 23.52% to save	**Erika**; 30.24% to save	**Victor**; 22.82% to save	**Lary**; 9.61% to save	**Tati**; 15.78% to save	**Erasmo**; 19.91% to save	**Tiago**; 26.87% to save	**Valentina**; 15.38% to save	**Gui Araujo**; 18.32% to save	**Dayane**; 27.00% to save	**Mileide**; 32.38% to save	**MC Gui**; 7.44% to save	**Dynho**; 1.89% to save	**Marina**; 2.77% (out of 4)
Evicted	**Mah**; 13.29% to enter	**Liziane**; 26.15% to save	**Mussunzinho**; 23.52% to save	**Erika**; 30.24% to save	**Victor**; 22.82% to save	**Lary**; 9.61% to save	**Tati**; 15.78% to save	**Erasmo**; 19.91% to save	**Tiago**; 26.87% to save	**Valentina**; 15.38% to save	**Gui Araujo**; 18.32% to save	**Dayane**; 27.00% to save	**Mileide**; 32.38% to save	**MC Gui**; 7.44% to save	**Dynho**; 1.89% to save	**Solange**; 3.70% (out of 3)
Evicted	**Mah**; 13.29% to enter	**Liziane**; 26.15% to save	**Mussunzinho**; 23.52% to save	**Erika**; 30.24% to save	**Victor**; 22.82% to save	**Lary**; 9.61% to save	**Tati**; 15.78% to save	**Erasmo**; 19.91% to save	**Tiago**; 26.87% to save	**Valentina**; 15.38% to save	**Gui Araujo**; 18.32% to save	**Dayane**; 27.00% to save	**Mileide**; 32.38% to save	**Aline**; 19.77% to save	**Sthe**; 10.45% to save	**Solange**; 3.70% (out of 3)
Evicted	**Krawk**; 15.81% to enter	**Liziane**; 26.15% to save	**Mussunzinho**; 23.52% to save	**Erika**; 30.24% to save	**Victor**; 22.82% to save	**Lary**; 9.61% to save	**Tati**; 15.78% to save	**Erasmo**; 19.91% to save	**Tiago**; 26.87% to save	**Valentina**; 15.38% to save	**Gui Araujo**; 18.32% to save	**Dayane**; 27.00% to save	**Mileide**; 32.38% to save	**Aline**; 19.77% to save	**Sthe**; 10.45% to save	**Bil**; 18.83% (out of 3)
Survived	**Sthe**; 67.19% to enter	**Solange**; 26.44% to save	**Bil**; 30.56% to save	**Dayane**; 33.69% to save	**Gui Araujo**; 25.93% to save	**Gui Araujo**; 28.24% to save	**MC Gui**; 20.41% to save	**Solange**; 23.97% to save	**Dayane**; 33.07% to save	**Solange**; 38.44% to save	**Dayane**; 24.67% to save	**Solange**; 32.74% to save	**Solange**; 32.48% to save	**Bil**; Most votes to save	**Rico**; Most votes to save	**Rico**; 77.47% to win
Survived	**Sthe**; 67.19% to enter	**Nego**; 47.41% to save	**Dayane**; 45.92% to save	**Tiago**; 36.07% to save	**Aline**; 51.25% to save	**Valentina**; 62.15% to save	**Rico**; 63.81% to save	**Rico**; 56.12% to save	**Sthe**; 40.06% to save	**Aline**; 46.18% to save	**Bil**; 57.01% to save	**Marina**; 40.26% to save	**Aline**; 35.14% to save	**Marina**; Most votes to save	**Solange**; Most votes to save	**Rico**; 77.47% to win

==== Notes ====
- **^Note 1**: Alisson, Krawk, Mah and Sthe entered the Warehouse live on day 2 during the special sneak peek episode that aired on September 13. On day 3, the public began to vote for one of them to enter in the game. Sthe received the most votes and moved into the main house on day 6. In addition, she received immunity for the nominations on week 1.
- **^Note 2**: On day 5, Aline won immunity for the first nominations through a special challenge.
- **^Note 3**: Dayane and Liziane received the most nominations with 4 each. Gui Araujo, as Farmer of the Week, had the casting vote and chose Liziane to be the second nominee.
- **^Note 4**: As the third nominee, Solange had to start the Save Chain in order to determine the fourth nominee. She saved Tati, who saved MC Gui, who saved Tiago, who saved Valentina, who saved Medrado, who saved Dayane, who saved Erasmo, who saved Victor, who saved Mussunzinho, who saved Dynho, who saved Bil, who saved Mileide, who saved Marina, who saved Rico, leaving Erika nominated. Erika was then asked to ban one of the other three nominees from competing in the Farmer challenge, thus going straight to the public vote. She chose Nego.
- **^Note 5**: On day 12, Medrado walked from the game for reasons undisclosed during the show. Medrado's staff took social media to release a statement in which they revealed that she was psychologically shaken before the show and that from now on she would focus on taking care of her mental health.
- **^Note 6**: On day 14, Nego was ejected from the game due to sexual assault allegations towards Dayane.
- **^Note 7**: Yellow flame power holder Rico chose to pass all 7 votes he received to Bil, increasing his nominations total to 8, thus making him the second nominee.
- **^Note 8**: As the third nominee, Dayane had to start the Save Chain in order to determine the fourth nominee. She saved Aline, who saved Rico, who saved Marina, who saved Mileide, who saved Sthe, who saved Victor, who saved Erasmo, who saved MC Gui, who saved Tati, who saved Solange, who saved Tiago, who saved Valentina, who saved Dynho, leaving Gui Araujo nominated.
- **^Note 9**: Red flame power holder Marina was asked to ban one of the four nominees from competing in the Farmer challenge, thus going straight to the public vote. She chose Mussunzinho.
- **^Note 10**: Lary entered the game on day 20 as Medrado's replacement. As a result, she received immunity for the nominations on week 3. Mileide was also immune from the House's vote due to the use of her Yellow flame power.
- **^Note 11**: Red flame power holder Bil chose Dayane to be the fourth nominee. Dayane was then asked to ban one of the other three nominees from competing in the Farmer challenge, thus going straight to the public vote. She chose Tiago.
- **^Note 12**: Bil won immunity for the nominations on week 4 due to the use of his Yellow flame power. In addition, he had to choose another contestant to also receive immunity. He chose Dynho.
- **^Note 13**: Gui Araujo's vote on Aline counted as two due to the use of his Red flame power.
- **^Note 14**: As the third nominee, Victor had to start the Save Chain in order to determine the fourth nominee. He saved Mileide, who saved Sthe, who saved Lary, who saved Marina, who saved MC Gui, who saved Erasmo, who saved Tati, who saved Solange, who saved Tiago, who saved Valentina, leaving Dayane nominated. Dayane was then asked to ban one of the other three nominees from competing in the Farmer challenge, thus going straight to the public vote. She chose Gui Araujo.
- **^Note 15**: Red flame power holder MC Gui chose to cancel Lary's vote on Aline as well as the votes Rico received by Bil, Dynho, Gui Araujo and Marina, thus bringing Rico's total to 2 and making Gui Araujo the second nominee with a total of 3 votes.
- **^Note 16**: As the third nominee, Valentina had to start the Save Chain in order to determine the fourth nominee. She saved Aline, who saved Rico, who saved Erasmo, who saved MC Gui, who saved Tiago, who saved Solange, who saved Tati, who saved Marina, who saved Sthe, who saved Mileide, who saved Dynho, leaving Lary nominated. Lary was then asked to ban one of the other three nominees from competing in the Farmer challenge, thus going straight to the public vote. She chose Valentina.
- **^Note 17**: Yellow flame power holder Gui Araujo chose to double the votes Solange received, bringing her total to 4.
- **^Note 18**: Rico and Solange received the most nominations with 4 each. Bil, as Farmer of the Week, had the casting vote and chose Rico to be the second nominee.
- **^Note 19**: As the third nominee, Tati had to start the Save Chain in order to determine the fourth nominee. She saved Solange, who saved Tiago, who saved Erasmo, who saved Dayane, who saved Aline, who saved Valentina, who saved Marina, who saved Gui Araujo, who saved Dynho, who saved Mileide, leaving Sthe nominated. Sthe was then asked to ban one of the other three nominees from competing in the Farmer challenge, thus going straight to the public vote. She chose MC Gui.
- **^Note 20**: Red flame power holder Dynho chose to replace MC Gui with Rico from competing in the Farmer challenge, thus making Rico go straight to the public vote.
- **^Note 21**: Dynho and Solange received the most nominations with 5 each. Sthe, as Farmer of the Week, had the casting vote and chose Solange to be the second nominee.
- **^Note 22**: Yellow flame power holder Tiago chose to save Aline, Valentina and himself from the Save Chain.
- **^Note 23**: As the third nominee, Erasmo had to start the Save Chain in order to determine the fourth nominee. He saved MC Gui, who saved Dayane, who saved Mileide, who saved Bil, who saved Gui Araujo, who saved Dynho, leaving Marina nominated. Marina was then asked to ban one of the other three nominees from competing in the Farmer challenge, thus going straight to the public vote. She chose Erasmo.
- **^Note 24**: Rico won immunity for the nominations on week 8 due to the use of his Yellow flame power. In addition, he had to choose another contestant to receive immunity from the House's vote. He chose Mileide.
- **^Note 25**: Since Red flame power holder Aline chose to maintain the Save Chain, as the third nominee, Tiago had to start it in order to determine the fourth nominee. He saved Solange, who saved Aline, who saved Valentina, who saved MC Gui, who saved Dynho, who saved Mileide, who saved Bil, leaving Gui Araujo nominated. Gui Araujo was then asked to ban one of the other three nominees from competing in the Farmer challenge, thus going straight to the public vote. He chose Tiago.
- **^Note 26**: On day 65, Aline won the power of double vote and Dynho won immunity from the Save Chain for the nominations of the week through a special challenge.
- **^Note 27**: As the third nominee, Dayane had to start the Save Chain in order to determine the fourth nominee. She saved Valentina, who saved MC Gui, who saved Sthe, who saved Mileide, who saved Bil, who saved Marina, leaving Solange nominated.
- **^Note 28**: Yellow flame power holder Dynho was asked to save one nominee (except the Farmer's) and choose a contestant from the main House to be in their place. He chose to save Dayane and replaced her with Valentina.
- **^Note 29**: Red flame power holder MC Gui chose to prevent Valentina from being banned from the Farmer challenge. Solange was then asked to ban one of the other two nominees from competing in it, thus going straight to the public vote. She chose Aline.
- **^Note 30**: Gui Araujo and Solange received the most nominations with 5 each. Rico, as Farmer of the Week, had the casting vote and chose Gui Araujo to be the second nominee.
- **^Note 31**: Red flame power holder Marina chose Dayane, Dynho and Sthe to be available as the third nominee. As the second nominee, Gui Araujo chose Dayane.
- **^Note 32**: Yellow flame power holder Aline chose to give immunity to Solange and herself from the Save Chain.
- **^Note 33**: As the third nominee, Dayane had to start the Save Chain in order to determine the fourth nominee. She saved Dynho, who saved Sthe, who saved Mileide, who saved Marina, leaving Bil nominated. Bil was then asked to ban one of the other three nominees from competing in the Farmer challenge, thus going straight to the public vote. He chose Gui Araujo.
- **^Note 34**: Dynho won immunity for the nominations on week 11 due to the use of his Yellow flame power.
- **^Note 35**: Red flame power holder Sthe had to choose the two contestants who would be eligible to become the fourth nominee through a surprise House vote. She chose Aline and Marina. Marina ended up being nominated by a 5–4 vote over Aline. She was then asked to ban one of the other three nominees from competing in the Farmer challenge, thus going straight to the public vote. She chose Dayane.
- **^Note 36**: Sthe won immunity for the nominations on week 12 due to the use of her Yellow flame power.
- **^Note 37**: As the third nominee, Aline had to start the Save Chain in order to determine the fourth nominee. She saved Marina, who saved Mileide, who saved MC Gui, leaving Solange nominated.
- **^Note 38**: Yellow flame power holder Dynho was asked to save one nominee (except the Farmer's) and choose another contestant to be in their place. He chose to save Bil and replaced him with Mileide.
- **^Note 39**: As the fourth nominee, Solange was asked to ban one of the other three nominees from competing in the Farmer challenge, thus going straight to the public vote. She chose Mileide.
- **^Note 40**: On day 92, the final eight contestants were automatically nominated for eviction in order to determine the finalists in two consecutive double evictions. Dynho and MC Gui, as the winning duo of the final challenge, had the power to choose who would face the public vote with them. Having been selected to be part of the first vote, MC Gui chose Marina first, so Dynho chose Rico to face the second public vote with him. MC Gui chose Bil to join him, while Dynho went with Solange. MC Gui made the final choice and nominated Aline, sending Sthe to be nominated alongside Dynho, Rico and Solange.
- **^Note 41**: For the final, the public votes for the contestant they want to win A Fazenda 13.

== Ratings and reception ==
=== Brazilian ratings ===
All numbers are in points and provided by Kantar Ibope Media.

Week	First air date	Last air date	Timeslot (BRT)	Daily SP viewers (in points)							SP viewers (in points)	BR viewers (in points)	Ref.
Week	First air date	Last air date	Timeslot (BRT)	Mon	Tue	Wed	Thu	Fri	Sat	Sun	SP viewers (in points)	BR viewers (in points)	Ref.
1	September 14, 2021	September 19, 2021	Monday to Saturday; 10:30 p.m. Sunday; 11:15 p.m.	—	12.0	10.2	10.2	9.4	8.2	7.6	10.0	8.2	
2	September 20, 2021	September 26, 2021	Monday to Saturday; 10:30 p.m. Sunday; 11:15 p.m.	9.8	9.4	8.9	10.1	8.1	9.7	8.3	9.4	7.8	
3	September 27, 2021	October 3, 2021	Monday to Saturday; 10:30 p.m. Sunday; 11:15 p.m.	9.4	8.9	9.3	10.0	10.1	7.0	6.4	9.0	7.1	
4	October 4, 2021	October 10, 2021	Monday to Saturday; 10:30 p.m. Sunday; 11:15 p.m.	9.2	9.3	9.0	9.7	9.9	6.9	6.6	8.9	7.4	
5	October 11, 2021	October 17, 2021	Monday to Saturday; 10:30 p.m. Sunday; 11:15 p.m.	9.1	10.5	9.3	10.3	9.9	6.8	7.4	9.2	7.5	
6	October 18, 2021	October 24, 2021	Monday to Saturday; 10:30 p.m. Sunday; 11:15 p.m.	8.9	8.6	10.5	10.1	9.1	7.2	8.7	9.2	7.5	
7	October 25, 2021	October 31, 2021	Monday to Saturday; 10:30 p.m. Sunday; 11:15 p.m.	10.1	9.9	10.0	10.6	7.2	7.0	7.6	9.4	7.7	
8	November 1, 2021	November 7, 2021	Monday to Saturday; 10:30 p.m. Sunday; 11:15 p.m.	10.2	10.6	11.1	10.2	7.1	6.7	7.7	9.7	7.8	
9	November 8, 2021	November 14, 2021	Monday to Saturday; 10:30 p.m. Sunday; 11:15 p.m.	9.1	10.4	10.4	10.6	9.1	7.4	7.8	9.6	7.8	
10	November 15, 2021	November 21, 2021	Monday to Saturday; 10:30 p.m. Sunday; 11:15 p.m.	9.6	11.9	11.6	11.0	10.9	9.2	6.0	10.4	8.5	
11	November 22, 2021	November 28, 2021	Monday to Saturday; 10:30 p.m. Sunday; 11:15 p.m.	9.5	10.5	10.6	10.8	8.2	6.9	6.6	9.6	8.0	
12	November 29, 2021	December 5, 2021	Monday to Saturday; 10:30 p.m. Sunday; 11:15 p.m.	9.2	10.1	9.7	10.1	9.1	7.0	7.6	9.2	8.1	
13	December 6, 2021	December 12, 2021	Monday to Saturday; 10:30 p.m. Sunday; 11:15 p.m.	9.1	10.6	9.9	9.9	9.1	6.9	8.8	9.4	7.9	
14	December 13, 2021	December 16, 2021	Monday to Saturday; 10:30 p.m. Sunday; 11:15 p.m.	10.8	10.7	10.3	12.5	—	—	—	11.2	9.2	

- In 2021, each point represents 268.278 households in 15 market cities in Brazil (76.577 households in São Paulo).

== Controversy and criticism ==
=== Sexual assault allegations ===
On September 25, 2021, singer Nego do Borel was accused by viewers of assaulting model Dayane Mello, who may have been too drunk to consent, after a party.

Following a strong social media outrage, the five main sponsors of A Fazenda (Ambev, TikTok, Seda, Banco Original and Aurora Alimentos) demanded Nego's ejection from the show to RecordTV. Later on that day, the ejection was confirmed by the network, after production review the footage and collected Dayane's testimony, to both viewers and contestants in the Farm.

However, RecordTV came under fire when, during the highlights episode that aired that night on primetime, the relationship between the two contestants was edited and shown in a romanticized and biased way in Nego's favor. In addition, two scenes in which he appears pulling Dayane back to bed and another where she told him to "stop" were all cut from the main show without explanation.

The network and production's handling of the situation were also slammed by viewers and the press for its sexist and overexposed portrayal, victim blaming and allegedly negligence during the act. Meanwhile, the host Adriane Galisteu, was praised for her emotional short speech about sexual consent at the end of the show.

On September 26, 2021, the Civil Police of the state of São Paulo announced that Nego do Borel will be summoned to testify on the accusations.
