= Roberto Justus =

Brazilian businessman

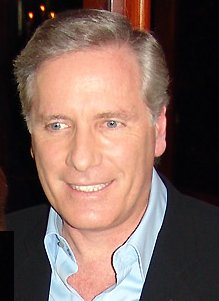
- Justus in 2006
- Born: Roberto Luiz Justus; 30 April 1955 (age 71); São Paulo, Brazil
- Occupations: • Chairman and president of Grupo Newcomm • Host of Roberto Justus +
- Spouses: Adriane Galisteu (m. 1998; div. 1999) Ticiane Pinheiro (m. 2006–2013) Ana Paula Siebert (m. 2016)
- Children: 5

Roberto Luiz Justus (born 30 April 1955) is a Brazilian investor, businessman and television personality.

== Biography and career ==
Justus was born in São Paulo, Brazil, to a Jewish Hungarian immigrant family. He is best known for O Aprendiz, broadcast by Record, which is the Brazilian version of The Apprentice (TV series). He married Ticiane Pinheiro who is the daughter of Helô Pinheiro, a Brazilian socialite. The couple, who divorced in 2013, have one daughter. He hosts the TV show Um Contra Cem on SBT and Roberto Justus + on Record.

Justus considered running for the presidency of Brazil in the 2018 elections, but eventually abandoned the idea.
