= Hadson =

Brazilian footballer (born 1981)

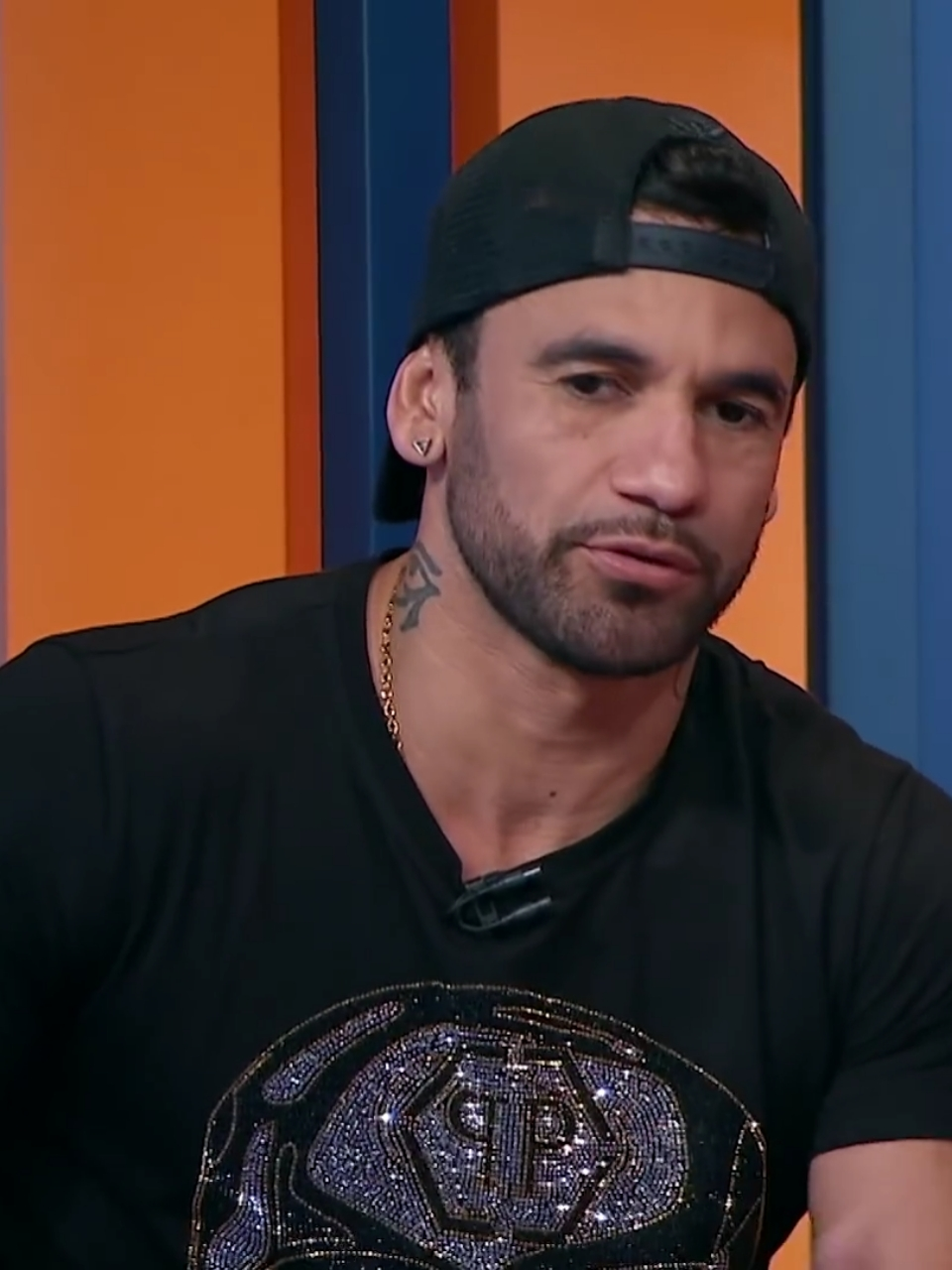
- Hadson in 2020

Personal information
- Full name: Hadson da Silva Nery
- Date of birth: 4 August 1981 (age 45)
- Place of birth: Belém, Brazil
- Height: 1.76 m (5 ft 9 in)
- Positions: Left back; defensive midfielder

Team information
- Current team: Vênus Atlético Clube (manager)

Youth career
- Corinthians
- Basel

Senior career*
Years	Team	Apps	(Gls)
2000–2002	Remo		
2003	Paraná		
2003	Alcains	9	(1)
2003–2005	Tavriya Simferopol	10	(0)
2005–2006	União Leiria	0	(0)
2006–2007	Ananindeua		
2006–2007	→ Gondomar (loan)	14	(1)
2007–2008	Paysandu		
2009	Pinheirense		
2010	Brasil de Pelotas		
2011	Paysandu		
2011	Tuna Luso		
2011	Nacional Montevideo	11	(0)
2012	América-SP	5	(0)
2013–2014	Bragantino-PA		

Managerial career
- 2022: Santos/AP
- 2023: Varginha
- 2023–2024: Pas de la Casa (Assistant)
- 2024: Penya Encarnada (Assistant)
- 2025–: Vênus
- * Club domestic league appearances and goals

Hadson da Silva Nery (born 4 August 1981), known as Hadson or Hadballa, is a Brazilian football coach and former player who played as either a left back or a defensive midfielder. He is the current manager of Vênus Atlético Clube.

Hadson is also a reality-television personality, having been a part of Big Brother Brasil 20 and Power Couple Brasil 6.

== Career ==
Born in Belém, Pará, Hadson began playing football in Corinthians' youth system. He began his professional career with Remo in 2000 and would play as a left back there until joining Paraná. Hadson began a two-year spell playing for Tavriya Simferopol in the Ukrainian Premier League in 2003.

Hadson returned to Brazil for one season with Ponte Preta before resuming his European career with Portuguese Liga side União Leiria and Segunda Liga club Gondomar. He resumed playing in Brazil enjoying spells with Paysandu and Pinheirense before joining Brasil de Pelotas in 2010.

After Hadson retired from playing football, he went into management of local club Bragantino Clube do Pará in 2014.

In 2020, he participated in the reality show Big Brother Brasil 20, as a civilian, being the third evicted from the program with 79.71% of the public vote to evict against Felipe Prior (20.29%).

In May 2021, Hadson was hired to be head coach of Grêmio Barueri, a former national topflight team, currently at the 4th division in the state of São Paulo, but left the club in August, after alleging that "promises were not fulfilled". In 2022, he agreed to take over Santos-AP, but preferred to participate in the reality show Power Couple Brasil 6 with his wife Eliza Fagundes, being the eighth eliminated from the program with 18.17% of the public vote to save against Adryana Ribeiro & Albert Bressan (29.24%) and Brenda Paixão & Matheus Sampaio (52.59%).

On 28 April 2023, Hadson was named head coach of Varginha, but was dismissed on 25 May, after just six matches. He later moved to Andorra after taking over FC Pas de la Casa, and led the club to the final of the 2024 Copa Constitució.

== Personal life ==
Hadson is the younger brother of the fellow retired footballer Harison Nery.

== Honours ==
• FC Pas de la Casa

- Copa Constitució: Runners-up 2024
