= Flay (singer) =

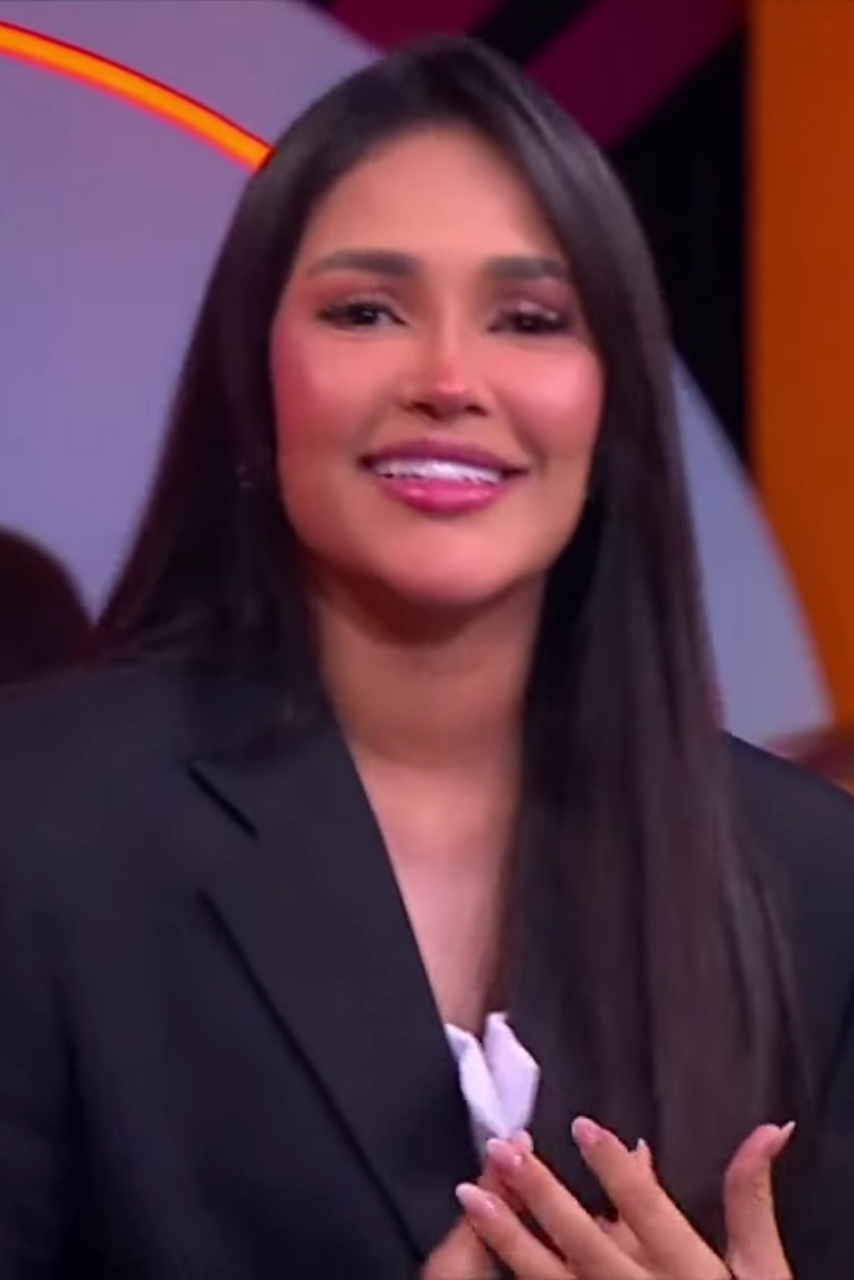
- Flay in 2023

Background information
- Born: Flayslane Raiane Pereira da Silva; October 19, 1994 (age 31)
- Occupations: Singer and digital influencer

Flayslane Raiane Pereira da Silva (born 1994), better known as Flayslane or simply Flay, is a Brazilian singer, songwriter, screenwriter, digital influencer and businesswoman.

== Biography ==
Flay was born on October 19, 1994 in Nova Floresta, Paraíba. At the age of 13, he started working with music and, soon after, at the age of 18, he left home to focus on his artistic career. She has a son, Bernardo, born in December 2017. She owns a bikini brand, a project that was born after her pregnancy, which caused, in the meantime, her musical career to be momentarily interrupted to focus primarily on pregnancy.

== Career ==
At the age of 13, Flay began working with music. During her adolescence, in the state of Paraíba, the singer became known to the forrozeiro public by the stage name Flaay Pink. In 2011, at the age of 17, she sang alongside the group Forró Safado. In the same year, she joined the group Forró da Burguesinha, where she stayed until February 2012, when she was hired by the renowned Ferro na Boneca. Already with greater professional recognition, Flay went to the Forró de Griff group and met Mara Araújo, who would later become her duo in sertanejo. The two were introduced by manager Luciano Maia as vocalists of the band, where Flay remained until 2014.

Shortly after, Flay participated in the Rainhas da Balada project, a group with numerous vocalists. In it, he met Mara again and stayed until 2015, still as Flaay Pink. In 2018, the two released together the EP Trago Verdades and the promotional album Desce Mais Uma. The project marked Flay's return to a musical career after the birth of her son, this time betting on suffering. In the wave of feminejo, the two won the support of artists such as Wesley Safadão, Léo Santana and the duo Maiara & Maraisa.

In 2020, she participated in the twentieth season of the reality show Big Brother Brasil, as one of the members of the group Pipoca, being the 13th eliminated with 63% of the votes in a wall against Babu Santana and Thelma Assis. After leaving BBB, the duo Lane & Mara came to an end and Flay made her solo debut in June 2020, participating in the song "Beat Gostosinho", by DJ Bárbara Labres. In July, the artist participated in the single "Quadrilha das Bandidas", by DJ Zullu. The following month, he released the single "Saudades Né Minha Filha" with singer Jerry Smith, this being his first solo work as a main artist. In September, it held the virtual event Pink Party, which featured the participation of Colombian singers Camilo and Farina. In October, she made the debut of her international career with participation in the Mexican program 5OLOELLAS — which has already received names such as Anitta, Tini and Sofía Reyes — and in the Colombian Lo Se Todo Colombia. In December, the singer released the song "Dois Vagabundos", in partnership with singer and actor Lucas Lucco.

On March 11, 2021, Flay released the first solo single of his career, titled "Osmar". She created the script and co-directed the video. The recording took place in Penedo, Alagoas, and featured the participation of several northeastern celebrities, such as Rita Cadillac, Carlinhos Maia, Thayse Teixeira, Camilla Uckers, João Quirino and Tiago Dionísio. On May 28, 2021, he released his fifth single as a lead artist, titled "Coração em Stand By", in a partnership with Eric Land and Menor Nico. On September 10, 2021, Flay kicked off her international career project with the release of the single "Céu Azul", a partnership with Ferrugem and Mexican singer Dulce María, known worldwide for participating in the group RBD and owner of one of the most profitable careers in Mexico. The song brings a mixture of pagode and piseiro, one of the most consumed rhythms in the Northeast of Brazil. The song has excerpts in Spanish, sung by Dulce. In addition, the three singers share vocals singing in Portuguese, English and French. Also in 2021, she participated in the singles "Caixinha VS Bunda", by Márcia Fellipe, and "Sentada da Deusa", by singer Luan Estilizado.

In 2023, she was champion of the third season of the reality show The Masked Singer Brasil, on TV Globo, where she performed dressed as DJ Vitória-Régia. The singer took the award after a fierce dispute against actress Larissa Luz and rapper Xamã. On the program she performed songs such as "Something's Got a Hold on Me", "Sentou e Gostou", "Disk Me", "Ex Mai Love", "BONEKINHA", "My Heart Will Go On", "Rise Up" and "I Want to Dance with Somebody".
