= Big Brother Brasil 20 =

Season of television series

- Season 20
- Hosted by: Tiago Leifert
- No. of days: 98
- No. of housemates: 20
- Winner: Thelma Assis
- Runner-up: Rafa Kalimann
- Companion shows: Rede BBB; A Eliminação
- No. of episodes: 98

Release
- Original network: TV Globo; Multishow; Globoplay
- Original release: January 21 – April 27, 2020

Season chronology
- ← Previous; Big Brother Brasil 19 Next → Big Brother Brasil 21

Big Brother Brasil 20 was the twentieth season of Big Brother Brasil which premiered on TV Globo on January 21, 2020. The show was produced by Globo and hosted by Tiago Leifert, who returned for his fourth season as the host.

The grand prize is R$1.5 million without tax allowances and a Fiat Toro Ultra car, plus a R$150.000 prize offered to the runner-up and a R$50.000 prize offered to the third place.

For the first time, the show is divided into two groups: "Celebrities", composed of actors, singers, professional athletes, and social media personalities, and "Civilians", composed of everyday Brazilians. On week 2, four new potential housemates entered the game as part of a twist, but only two of them actually moved into the house, bringing the total number of housemates up to 20.

On March 12, TV Globo suspended all live audiences for their shows due to the COVID-19 pandemic in Brazil. On March 16, or Day 56 inside the house, the housemates were notified of the current events outside of the house. The channel also moved the show's broadcast timeslot from 10:30 p.m. to 10:45 p.m. due to the extent of news coverage on their primetime national newscast. Sunday's live nominations shows were also moved from 11:30 p.m. to 11:00 p.m. due to the channel cutting some of their entertainment programs (such as the fifth season of The Voice Kids) for that day.

As of March 31, 2020, the season broke three worldwide voting records. Guilherme's eviction against Gizelly and Pyong on week 6 reached the mark of 416 million votes, surpassing the old mark of 202 million votes cast in the previous season. Pyong's eviction against Babu and Rafa on week 8 broke the record of simultaneous voting with 1.4 million votes cast per minute, with 385 million votes counted. Then, on week 10, a new record-breaking number of 1.5 billion votes resulted in Felipe's eviction against Manu and Mari, and entered the Guinness World Record for "Most public votes received by a television programme".

In order to celebrate the show's 20th season anniversary, competitions and twists from previous seasons were revived and scattered again throughout this season. The season was originally planned to last 94 days, the longest of the series, ending on April 23, 2020. On April 13, 2020, TV Globo announced that the season was extended in 4 days, with the live finale moved to April 27, 2020, for a total of 98 days.

On April 27, 2020, anesthesiologist Thelma Assis won the competition with 44.1% of the public vote over digital influencer Rafa Kalimann and actress & singer Manu Gavassi. According to Ibope (Brazilian Institute of Public Opinion and Statistics), this season had an average of 25 million views in the 15 largest metropolitan areas in Brazil, with a 43% share. This means that 4 out of 10 television sets in the country were tuned to the reality show. In addition, a total of 165 million people were reached during the three months that the program was aired.

== The game ==
=== #FeedBBB ===
This season, each housemate will be able to use a cellphone to capture moments in the house during a time determined by production. The cell phone will only allow them to post photos and videos to #FeedBBB and see what other housemates are saying about each other. It will not allow contact with the outside world.

=== Super HoH ===
Along with its regular powers, this season the HoH will also be tasked with splitting their housemates into Haves and Have-Nots as well as choosing what and how much each group will be eating. This HoH will also be awarded their own private party at the end of their HoH reign.

=== The Wall ===
On Day 1, 18 housemates entered the Big Brother house, divided by a wall with Celebrities on one side and Civilians on the other. The two groups were not able to see each other until the end of night 2, after the wall fell. Twist introduced in Big Brother Brasil 9.

=== Power of Veto ===
In some weeks, the nominated housemates (excluding the HoH's nominee) compete against each other for one last chance to save themselves from eviction. Housemates nominated by the HoH are not eligible to compete and are guaranteed to face Brazil's vote. A re-worked version of a twist featured in the first week of Big Brother Brasil 18.

=== Glass House ===
On Day 12, four additional housemates entered the Glass house where the public voted for two of them (one man and one woman) to move into the main House. Twist introduced in Big Brother Brasil 9, re-used in Big Brother Brasil 11 (featuring the first five evicted housemates from that season) and Big Brother Brasil 13.

=== White Room ===
On Day 46, three housemates (Felipe, Gizelly and Manu) were chosen to enter the White Room, where they would stay until the live nominations on Day 48, unless one of them pressed the red button, thus becoming the first nominee of the week. A re-worked version of a twist introduced in Big Brother Brasil 9, re-used in Big Brother Brasil 10.

=== Big Phone ===
Once in a while, the Big Phone rings, unleashing good or bad consequences on the nomination process for those who decide to answer it. Twist introduced in Big Brother Brasil 8, permanent from then onwards.

Week	Housemate	Date	Timeslot	Consequences
2	Petrix	February 1, 2020	Saturday; 10:52 p.m.	See note 6
4	Felipe	February 16, 2020	Sunday; 8:01 a.m.	See note 10

=== Power of No ===
At the beginning of each week, the previous Head of Household may or may not be given the opportunity to disqualify some housemates from competing in the upcoming HoH competition. Twist introduced in Big Brother Brasil 12, permanent from then onwards.

Week	Housemate	Total	Vetoed housemates
3	Guilherme	4	Daniel, Felipe, Hadson, Lucas
6	Rafa	3	Felipe, Guilherme, Mari
10	Thelma	1	Flayslane

=== The Counterattack ===
Introduced this season, the counterattack is a surprise power given to either the HoH's nominee and/or the House's nominee, in which they have the opportunity to automatically nominate an additional housemate for eviction. While viewers are informed when the power will be featured in advance (on Thursdays before the Head of Household competition even takes place), the housemates are only informed about the twist on the spot, during Sunday's live nominations.

Week		Housemate	Status	Used on:	Result
6		Guilherme	HoH's nominee	Pyong	See note 13
6		Felipe	House's nominee	Gizelly	See note 13
9		Felipe	House's nominee	Ivy	See note 17
10		Felipe	HoH's nominee	Manu	See note 19
11	Day 74	Babu	House's nominee	Gabi	See note 23
13	Day 88	Ivy	House's nominee	Thelma	See note 28
13	Day 90	Manu	House's nominee	Babu	See note 29

== Housemates ==
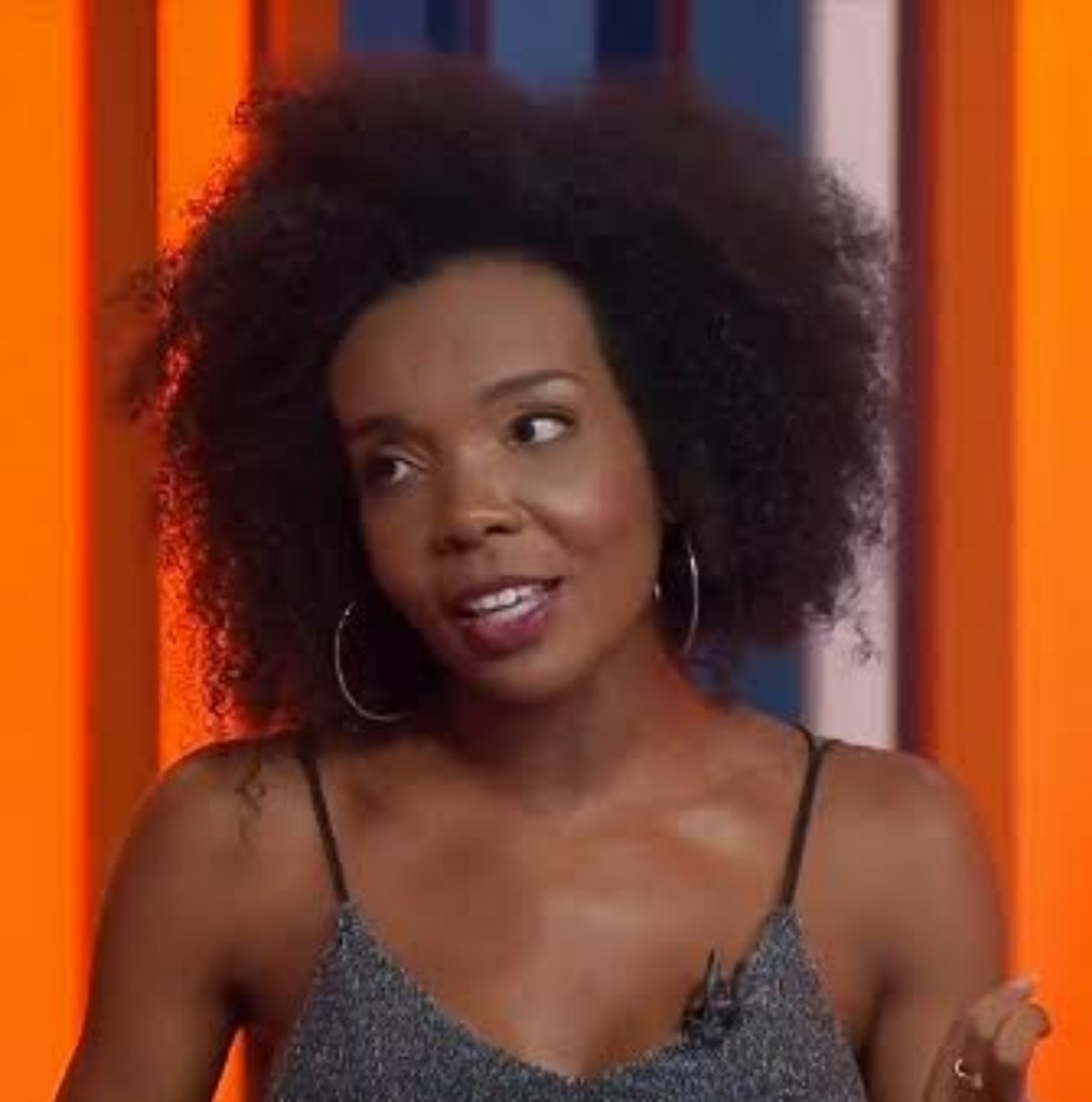
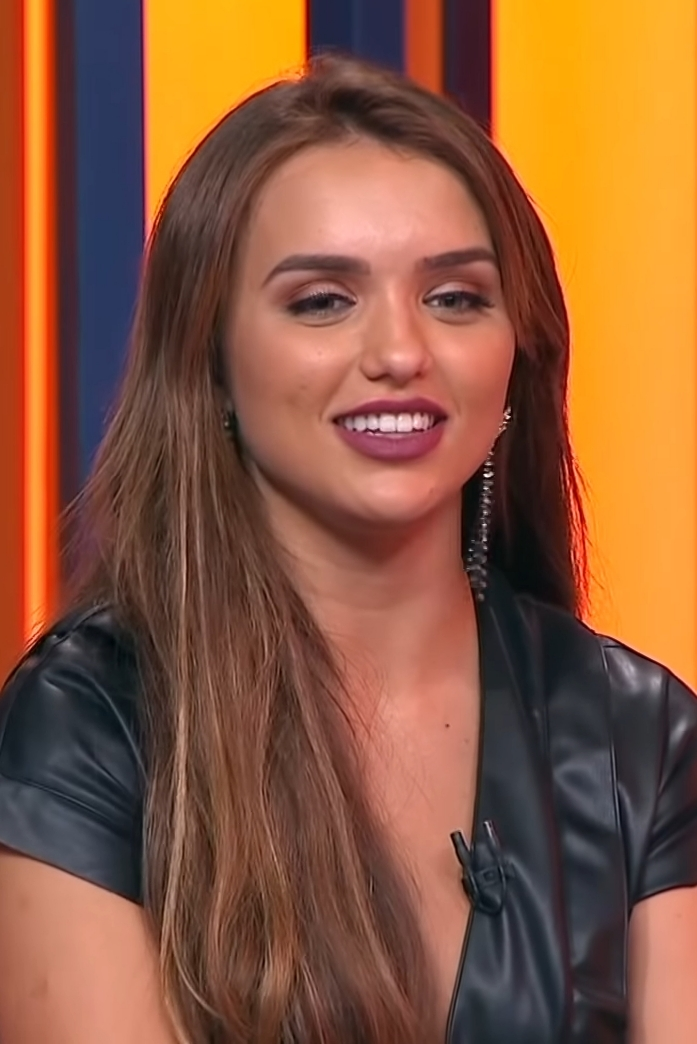
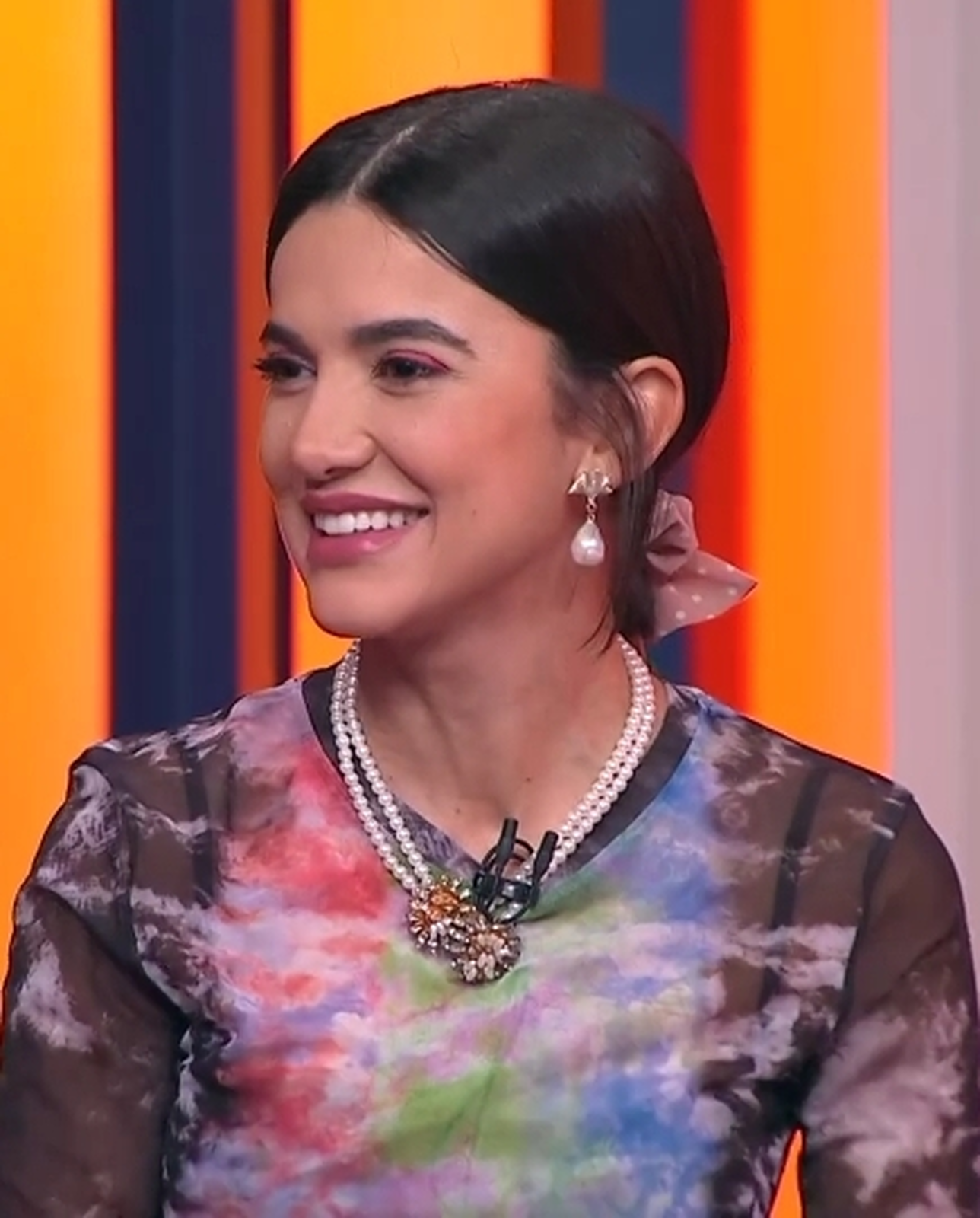
Thelma Assis (Winner), Rafa Kalimann (Runner-up) and Manu Gavassi (Third place), the finalists of Big Brother Brasil 20.

The cast of 18 official housemates was unveiled on January 18, 2020, three days before the premiere, during breaks in TV Globo programming and on Gshow. On January 31, four more candidates were revealed, who entered the Glass House competing for the last two spots in the game Daniel Lenhardt and Ivy Moraes secured the final two spots in the program by winning the popular vote against Daniel Caon and Renata Dornelles, respectively.

Name	Age	Type	Hometown	Occupation	Day entered	Day exited	Result
Thelma Assis	35	Civilian	São Paulo	Anesthesiologist	1	98	Winner
Rafa Kalimann	26	Celebrity	Campina Verde	Digital influencer	1	98	Runner-up
Manu Gavassi	27	Celebrity	São Paulo	Actress & singer	1	98	Third place
Babu Santana	40	Celebrity	Rio de Janeiro	Actor	1	96	17th Evicted
Mari Gonzalez	25	Celebrity	Salvador	Digital influencer	1	92	16th Evicted
Ivy Moraes	27	Civilian	Belo Horizonte	Model	16	90	15th Evicted
Gizelly Bicalho	28	Civilian	Iúna	Lawyer	1	85	14th Evicted
Flayslane Raiane	25	Civilian	Nova Floresta	Singer	1	83	13th Evicted
Marcela McGowan	31	Civilian	Rancharia	Gynecologist & obstetrician	1	78	12th Evicted
Gabi Martins	23	Celebrity	Belo Horizonte	Singer	1	76	11th Evicted
Felipe Prior	27	Civilian	São Paulo	Architect	1	71	10th Evicted
Daniel Lenhardt	22	Civilian	Selbach	Actor	16	64	9th Evicted
Pyong Lee	27	Celebrity	São Paulo	Hypnologist	1	57	8th Evicted
Victor Hugo Teixeira	25	Civilian	Imperatriz	Public health scientist & psychologist	1	50	7th Evicted
Guilherme Napolitano	28	Civilian	Presidente Prudente	Model	1	43	6th Evicted
Bianca Andrade	25	Celebrity	Rio de Janeiro	Digital influencer & businesswoman	1	36	5th Evicted
Lucas Gallina	26	Civilian	Florianópolis	Physiotherapist	1	29	4th Evicted
Hadson Nery	38	Civilian	Belém	Former football player	1	22	3rd Evicted
Petrix Barbosa	27	Celebrity	São Paulo	Gymnast	1	15	2nd Evicted
Lucas Chumbo	24	Celebrity	Saquarema	Professional surfer	1	8	1st Evicted

Glass House housemates

The cast list was unveiled on January 31, 2020.

Name	Age	Type	Hometown	Occupation	Day entered	Day exited	Result
Ivy Moraes	27	Civilian	Belo Horizonte	Model	12	15	Selected
Renata Dornelles	32	Civilian	Campo Grande	Physical education teacher	12	15	Not Selected
Daniel Caon	26	Civilian	Linhares	Songwriter	12	15	Not Selected
Daniel Lenhardt	22	Civilian	Selbach	Actor	12	15	Selected

== Future appearances ==
In 2021, Pyong Lee appeared as a contestant on the first season of Bake Off Celebridades 1, he finished in tied 3rd place in the competition. Pyong also appeared in Ilha Record 1, where he runner-up in the competition.

In 2021, Thelma Assis appeared on Big Brother Brasil 21 as a host in an activity.

In 2021, Guilherme Napolitano and Lucas Chumbo appeared in No Limite 5. Chumbo finished in 13th place, while Guilherme finished in 9th place.

In 2022, Ivy Moraes, with her boyfriend Nandinho Borges, and Hadson Nery, with his wife Eliza Fagundes, appeared in Power Couple Brasil 6. Ivy & Nandinho finished in 8th place, while Hadson & Eliza finished in 5th place.

In 2022, Guilherme Napolitano appeared in Bake Off Celebridades 2, he finished in 15th place.

In 2023, Babu Santana and Flayslane Raiane appeared in The Masked Singer Brasil 3. Babu, as the Coruja (Owl), placed 6th, while Flayslane, as the DJ Vitória-Régia (DJ Water-Lily), won the competition.

In 2024, Gizelly Bicalho appeared in A Fazenda 16, she entered in the Warehouse where the public voted for four contestants to move into the main house, she received enough votes to enter in the game and finished in 14th place in the competition.

In 2026, Babu Santana returned in Big Brother Brasil 26, he finished the competition in 14th place.

== Voting history ==
Key
– Civilians
– Celebrities
– Glass House Civilians

	Week 1	Week 2		Week 3	Week 4	Week 5	Week 6	Week 7	Week 8	Week 9	Week 10	Week 11			Week 12			Week 13		Week 14	
	Week 1	Glass House	Main House	Week 3	Week 4	Week 5	Week 6	Week 7	Week 8	Week 9	Week 10	Day 74	Day 76		Day 81	Day 83		Day 88	Day 90	Day 94	Finale
Head of Household	Petrix	(none)	Guilherme	Gabi	Guilherme	Rafa	Ivy	Pyong	Felipe	Thelma	Gizelly	Flayslane	Thelma		Ivy	Manu		Mari	Rafa	(none)	(none)
Power of Immunity	Mari	(none)	Babu	Lucas	Victor Hugo	Pyong	Guilherme	Ivy	Daniel; Ivy	Rafa	Marcela	Gabi	(none)					(none)		(none)	(none)
Saved	Mari	(none)	Thelma	Lucas	Mari	Daniel	Gabi	Ivy	Gizelly	Gabi	Thelma	Rafa	(none)					(none)		(none)	(none)
Nomination (Twists)	(none)	(none)	Petrix; Pyong	(none)	Marcela	Flayslane	Gizelly; Pyong	Manu	Babu; Rafa	Daniel; Ivy	Gabi; Manu; Mari	Gabi	(none)					Thelma	Babu	Babu; Rafa; Thelma	(none)
Nomination (HoH)	Bianca	(none)	Babu	Hadson	Lucas	Bianca	Guilherme	Victor Hugo	Pyong	Flayslane	Felipe	Thelma	Flayslane		Thelma	Mari		Rafa	Mari	(none)	(none)
Nomination (Housemates)	Chumbo; Pyong	(none)	Hadson	Felipe; Victor Hugo	Babu; Victor Hugo	Felipe	Felipe	Babu	Flayslane	Felipe	Flayslane	Babu	Babu	Marcela	Babu; Flayslane	Babu	Gizelly	Ivy	Manu	(none)	(none)
Veto Players	Chumbo; Pyong	(none)	(none)	Felipe; Victor Hugo	Babu; Marcela; Victor Hugo	(none)	Felipe; Gizelly; Pyong	(none)	Babu; Flayslane; Rafa	Daniel; Felipe; Ivy	Flayslane; Gabi; Manu; Mari	(none)								(none)	(none)
Veto Winner(s)	Pyong	(none)	(none)	Victor Hugo	Marcela	(none)	Felipe	(none)	Flayslane	Felipe	Flayslane; Gabi	(none)								(none)	(none)
Thelma	Chumbo	Not eligible	Hadson	Felipe	Flayslane	Guilherme	Felipe	Flayslane	Daniel	Head of Household	Flayslane	Mari	Head of Household		Flayslane	Babu	Not eligible	Ivy	Manu	Nominated	Winner (Day 98)
Rafa	Pyong	Not eligible	Hadson	Flayslane	Flayslane	Head of Household	Flayslane	Flayslane	Flayslane	Felipe	Flayslane	Mari	Not eligible	Marcela	Flayslane	Babu	Not eligible	Ivy	Head of Household	Nominated	Runner-up (Day 98)
Manu	Pyong	Not eligible	Hadson	Felipe	Babu	Felipe	Babu	Babu	Flayslane	Felipe	Flayslane	Mari	Not eligible	Ivy	Flayslane	Head of Household		Ivy	Babu	Exempt	Third place (Day 98)
Babu	Pyong	Not eligible	Hadson	Victor Hugo	Victor Hugo	Pyong	Mari	Flayslane	Mari	Mari	Marcela	Mari	Not eligible	Marcela	Gizelly	Rafa	Not eligible	Ivy	Manu	Nominated	Evicted (Day 96)
Mari	Pyong	Not eligible	Felipe	Felipe	Babu	Babu	Babu	Babu	Thelma	Felipe	Rafa	Manu	Not eligible	Gizelly	Manu	Not eligible	Gizelly	Head of Household	Manu	Evicted (Day 92)	
Ivy	Not in House	Glass; House	Not in House	Felipe	Babu	Babu	Head of Household	Babu	Flayslane	Babu	Babu	Babu	Babu	Not eligible	Babu	Not eligible	Not eligible	Thelma	Evicted (Day 90)		
Gizelly	Chumbo	Not eligible	Mari	Felipe	Babu	Felipe	Felipe	Babu	Flayslane	Mari	Flayslane	Babu	Mari	Not eligible	Babu	Not eligible	Not eligible	Evicted (Day 85)			
Flayslane	Babu	Not eligible	Victor Hugo	Victor Hugo	Victor Hugo	Pyong	Babu	Babu	Daniel	Gizelly	Rafa	Babu	Rafa	Not eligible	Rafa	Evicted (Day 83)					
Marcela	Chumbo	Not eligible	Hadson	Felipe	Babu	Felipe	Felipe	Felipe	Flayslane	Mari	Babu	Babu	Babu	Not eligible	Evicted (Day 78)						
Gabi	Pyong	Not eligible	Hadson	Head of Household	Babu	Felipe	Babu	Felipe	Flayslane	Felipe	Babu	Babu	Evicted (Day 76)								
Felipe	Pyong	Not eligible	Mari	Gizelly	Victor Hugo	Pyong	Mari	Flayslane	Head of Household	Mari	Rafa	Evicted (Day 71)									
Daniel	Not in House	Glass; House	Not in House	Felipe	Babu	Felipe	Felipe	Felipe	Flayslane	Felipe	Evicted (Day 64)										
Pyong	Chumbo	Not eligible	Hadson	Felipe	Babu	Felipe	Felipe	Head of Household	Mari	Evicted (Day 57)											
Victor Hugo	Pyong	Not eligible	Flayslane	Felipe	Babu	Felipe	Babu	Gizelly	Evicted (Day 50)												
Guilherme	Manu	Not eligible	Head of Household	Thelma	Head of Household	Pyong	Manu	Evicted (Day 43)													
Bianca	Pyong	Not eligible	Victor Hugo	Victor Hugo	Victor Hugo	Pyong	Evicted (Day 36)														
Lucas	Pyong	Not eligible	Mari	Victor Hugo	Daniel	Evicted (Day 29)															
Hadson	Manu	Not eligible	Mari	Gizelly	Evicted (Day 22)																
Petrix	Head of Household	Not eligible	Hadson	Evicted (Day 15)																	
Caon	Not in House	Glass; House	Evicted (Glass House)																		
Renata	Not in House	Glass; House	Evicted (Glass House)																		
Chumbo	Pyong	Evicted (Day 8)																			
Notes	1, 2, 3	4	5, 6, 7	2, 3, 4, 8	3, 9, 10	11, 12	13	2, 12, 14	15	16, 17	18, 19; 20, 21	22, 23	24, 25		3, 26	27		28	29	30	31
Nominated for eviction	Bianca; Chumbo	Ivy; Renata	Babu; Hadson; Petrix; Pyong	Felipe; Hadson	Babu; Lucas; Victor Hugo	Bianca; Felipe; Flayslane	Gizelly; Guilherme; Pyong	Babu; Manu; Victor Hugo	Babu; Pyong; Rafa	Daniel; Flayslane; Ivy	Felipe; Manu; Mari	Babu; Gabi; Thelma	Babu; Flayslane; Marcela		Babu; Flayslane; Thelma	Babu; Gizelly; Mari		Ivy; Rafa; Thelma	Babu; Manu; Mari	Babu; Rafa; Thelma	Manu; Rafa; Thelma
Nominated for eviction	Bianca; Chumbo	Caon; Daniel	Babu; Hadson; Petrix; Pyong	Felipe; Hadson	Babu; Lucas; Victor Hugo	Bianca; Felipe; Flayslane	Gizelly; Guilherme; Pyong	Babu; Manu; Victor Hugo	Babu; Pyong; Rafa	Daniel; Flayslane; Ivy	Felipe; Manu; Mari	Babu; Gabi; Thelma	Babu; Flayslane; Marcela		Babu; Flayslane; Thelma	Babu; Gizelly; Mari		Ivy; Rafa; Thelma	Babu; Manu; Mari	Babu; Rafa; Thelma	Manu; Rafa; Thelma
Evicted	Chumbo; 76% to evict	Renata; 39% to enter	Petrix; 80% to evict	Hadson; 80% to evict	Lucas; 63% to evict	Bianca; 53% to evict	Guilherme; 56% to evict	Victor Hugo; 85% to evict	Pyong; 52% to evict	Daniel; 81% to evict	Felipe; 57% to evict	Gabi; 60% to evict	Marcela; 49.76% to evict		Flayslane; 63% to evict	Gizelly; 55% to evict		Ivy; 74% to evict	Mari; 54% to evict	Babu; 57% to evict	Manu; 21% to win
Evicted	Chumbo; 76% to evict	Caon; 41% to enter	Petrix; 80% to evict	Hadson; 80% to evict	Lucas; 63% to evict	Bianca; 53% to evict	Guilherme; 56% to evict	Victor Hugo; 85% to evict	Pyong; 52% to evict	Daniel; 81% to evict	Felipe; 57% to evict	Gabi; 60% to evict	Marcela; 49.76% to evict		Flayslane; 63% to evict	Gizelly; 55% to evict		Ivy; 74% to evict	Mari; 54% to evict	Babu; 57% to evict	Rafa; 35% to win
Survived	Bianca; 24% to evict	Ivy; 61% to enter	Hadson; 19% to evict	Felipe; 20% to evict	Victor Hugo; 36% to evict	Felipe; 29% to evict	Pyong; 43% to evict	Manu; 10% to evict	Babu; 47% to evict	Ivy; 10% to evict	Manu; 43% to evict	Thelma; 36% to evict	Flayslane; 49.18% to evict		Thelma; 36% to evict	Babu; 41% to evict		Thelma; 20% to evict	Manu; 41% to evict	Thelma; 31% to evict	Thelma; 44% to win
Survived	Bianca; 24% to evict	Ivy; 61% to enter	Pyong; 0.66% to evict	Felipe; 20% to evict	Victor Hugo; 36% to evict	Felipe; 29% to evict	Pyong; 43% to evict	Manu; 10% to evict	Babu; 47% to evict	Ivy; 10% to evict	Manu; 43% to evict	Thelma; 36% to evict	Flayslane; 49.18% to evict		Thelma; 36% to evict	Babu; 41% to evict		Thelma; 20% to evict	Manu; 41% to evict	Thelma; 31% to evict	Thelma; 44% to win
Survived	Bianca; 24% to evict	Daniel; 59% to enter	Pyong; 0.66% to evict	Felipe; 20% to evict	Babu; 1% to evict	Flayslane; 18% to evict	Gizelly; 1% to evict	Babu; 5% to evict	Rafa; 1% to evict	Flayslane; 9% to evict	Mari; 1% to evict	Babu; 4% to evict	Babu; 1% to evict		Babu; 1% to evict	Mari; 4% to evict		Rafa; 6% to evict	Babu; 5% to evict	Rafa; 12% to evict	Thelma; 44% to win
Survived	Bianca; 24% to evict	Daniel; 59% to enter	Babu; 0.44% to evict	Felipe; 20% to evict	Babu; 1% to evict	Flayslane; 18% to evict	Gizelly; 1% to evict	Babu; 5% to evict	Rafa; 1% to evict	Flayslane; 9% to evict	Mari; 1% to evict	Babu; 4% to evict	Babu; 1% to evict		Babu; 1% to evict	Mari; 4% to evict		Rafa; 6% to evict	Babu; 5% to evict	Rafa; 12% to evict	Thelma; 44% to win
Votes	+25,000,000		+73,000,000			+132,000,000	416,649,126		+385,000,000	+111,000,000	1,532,944,337	+155,000,000	+295,000,000			+230,000,000			+359,000,000	+236,000,000	

=== Notes ===
- ^Note 1 : On Day 1, the housemates (divided as "Celebrities" and "Civilians"), competed in an endurance competition for immunity. After 9 hours, the "Civilians" won immunity for the first nominations.
- ^Note 2 : This week, Big Brother revealed to the viewers that the winner of the Power of Immunity competition, instead of giving immunity to someone else, would win the immunity. The housemates were only informed about the twist during the live nominations.
- ^Note 3 : This week, top 2 vote recipients beceame the House's Nominees.
- ^Note 4 : Caon, Daniel, Ivy and Renata, entered the Glass House on Day 12, where the public voted to save two of them (one man and one woman). Ivy and Daniel received the most votes and moved into the main house on Day 16. Upon entry to the house, Ivy & Daniel received immunity for their first week in the main game.
- ^Note 5 : Unbeknownst to the housemates, the housemate positioned at station 7 on this week's HoH competition would win the power to instantly nominate a housemate for eviction. Pyong was that housemate and then nominated Petrix.
- ^Note 6 : On Day 12, Petrix answered the Big Phone and was tasked with nominating a second housemate for eviction. He nominated Pyong.
- ^Note 7 : Petrix was originally scheduled to compete in the Power of Veto alongside the housemate nominated by the House vote. However, before the live nominations, due to the controversy surrounding the foot race between him and Pyong to answer the Big Phone the night before, Big Brother revealed to the viewers that the competition was cancelled and all four nominees would be face Brazil's vote.
- ^Note 8 : This week, the Housemates nominated in a face-to-face round of voting.
- ^Note 9 : As the loser of the HoH competition, Marcela was automatically nominated for eviction.
- ^Note 10 : Felipe answered the Big Phone and was awarded immunity.
- ^Note 11 : After winning the HoH competition, Rafa had to pick 3 housemates to receive a 'bottle of consequences'. She chose Bianca, Felipe and Flayslane. The consequences were as follows:
  - Bianca lost 300 Estalecas
  - Felipe was removed from the week's Power of Immunity competition
  - Flayslane was automatically nominated for eviction
- ^Note 12 : There was no Power of Veto during this week.
- ^Note 13 : This week, both the HoH's nominee & the House's nominee had the power to name an additional nominee. During the nominations, Ivy, as HoH, nominated Guilherme, who in-turn nominated Pyong. The Housemates nominated Felipe, who in turn nominated Gizelly.
- ^Note 14 : After the Power of Immunity competition, Big Brother revealed the "White Room" and forced the PoI holder to pick a fellow Housemate to go to the room. PoI Ivy picked Felipe, who had to pick two more Housemates to join him: Gizelly and Manu. In the room, they were told that they were all nominated for eviction, however they were given a dilemma - should one of three elect to press the red button, the trio would be freed from the room and save the other two from being nominated. Manu pressed the button, removing Felipe & Gizelly from nominations.
- ^Note 15 : Unbeknownst to the housemates, the first and the last housemates eliminated from week 8's HoH endurance competition would be instantly nominated for eviction. Babu was the first to leave, while Rafa was the last, so they became the first two nominees of the week. The housemates were only informed about the twist during the live nominations.
- ^Note 16 : During Week 9's HoH endurance competition, the first housemate eliminated would be automatically nominated, while the last eliminated housemate would win immunity.
- ^Note 17 : The House's nominee had the power to name an additional nominee. During the nominations, the Housemates nominated Felipe, who in-turn nominated Ivy.
- ^Note 18 : Week 10's HoH competition, was a pairs competition. The winning pair of Gizelly and Ivy had to allocate among themselves the HoH title (chosen by Gizelly) & a cash prize of R$10.000 (chosen by Ivy). Additionally, the losing pair would be automatically nominated. Gabi & Mari lost and were automatically nominated for eviction.
- ^Note 19 : This week, the HoH's nominee had the power to name an additional nominee. During the nominations, Gizelly, as HoH, nominated Felipe, who in-turn nominated Manu.
- ^Note 20 : As Head of Household, Gizelly was forced to break the tie between Babu, Flayslane and Rafa (with three votes each). She nominated Flayslane.
- ^Note 21 : Week 10 featured the final veto competition and it was a double Veto. Of the 4 Veto players, 2 would win a veto and avoid nominations, leaving the other two facing Brazil's vote alongside the HoH's nominee.
- ^Note 22 : As Head of Household, Flayslane was forced to break the tie between Babu and Mari (with four votes each). She nominated Babu.
- ^Note 23 : This round, the House's nominee had the power to name an additional nominee. During the nominations, the Housemates nominated Babu, who in-turn nominated Gabi.
- ^Note 24 : From this point forward, all nominations would be made in face-to-face voting.
- ^Note 25 : This round, the House (except Head of Household Thelma) was divided into two groups of four each, where they could only nominate a housemate from the other group. The first group (Babu, Manu, Mari and Rafa) nominated Marcela with two votes. The second group (Flayslane, Gizelly, Ivy and Marcela) nominated Babu with two votes.
- ^Note 26 : As Head of Household, Ivy was forced to break the tie between Babu, Gizelly, Manu and Rafa (with one vote each) to determine the House's second nominee. She nominated Babu.
- ^Note 27 : This round, two Housemates were nominated by the house - the Haves (Babu, Rafa and Thelma) had to vote to nominate one of their own, and the Have-Nots (Gizelly, Ivy and Mari) nominating one of their own. As Mari was previously nominated by the HoH Manu, Gizelly and Ivy remained with no options for nominating. So, Mari was the only one from the Have-Not group to cast a vote.
- ^Note 28 : This round, the House's nominee had the power to name an additional nominee. During the nominations, the Housemates nominated Ivy, who in-turn nominated Thelma.
- ^Note 29 : This round, the House's nominee had the power to name an additional nominee. During the nominations, the Housemates nominated Manu, who in-turn nominated Babu.
- ^Note 30 : Manu won the final competition, winning immunity from the final eviction and granting her a place in the Finale. Babu, Rafa and Thelma were automatically nominated for eviction by default.
- ^Note 31 : For the final, the public will vote for the housemate they want to win Big Brother Brasil 20.

=== Have and Have-Nots ===
	Week 1	Week 2	Week 3	Week 4	Week 5	Week 6	Week 7	Week 8	Week 9	Week 10	Week 11		Week 12		Week 13		Week 14
	Week 1	Week 2	Week 3	Week 4	Week 5	Week 6	Week 7	Week 8	Week 9	Week 10	Day 73	Day 76	Day 81	Day 83	Day 87	Day 90	Week 14
Thelma	Have-Not	Have-Not	Have	Have-Not	Have	Have-Not	Have	Have-Not	Have	Have-Not	Have-Not	Have	Have-Not	Have	Have-Not	Have-Not	Have
Rafa	Have	Have	Have-Not	Have	Have	Have-Not	Have	Have-Not	Have-Not	Have	Have-Not	Have	Have-Not	Have	Have-Not	Have	Have
Manu	Have	Have	Have-Not	Have-Not	Have	Have-Not	Have	Have-Not	Have-Not	Have	Have-Not	Have	Have-Not	Have	Have-Not	Have	Have
Babu	Have	Have-Not	Have	Have-Not	Have-Not	Have-Not	Have-Not	Have	Have-Not	Have-Not	Have	Have-Not	Have-Not	Have	Have-Not	Have-Not	Have
Mari	Have	Have	Have-Not	Have	Have-Not	Have	Have-Not	Have-Not	Have-Not	Have-Not	Have	Have-Not	Have	Have-Not	Have	Have-Not	
Ivy			Have	Have-Not	Have-Not	Have	Have-Not	Have-Not	Have-Not	Have	Have	Have-Not	Have	Have-Not	Have		
Gizelly	Have-Not	Have-Not	Have	Have-Not	Have	Have	Have-Not	Have-Not	Have	Have	Have-Not	Have-Not	Have	Have-Not			
Flayslane	Have-Not	Have	Have	Have	Have-Not	Have	Have-Not	Have-Not	Have-Not	Have-Not	Have	Have-Not	Have-Not				
Marcela	Have-Not	Have-Not	Have	Have-Not	Have	Have	Have-Not	Have-Not	Have	Have-Not	Have-Not	Have-Not					
Gabi	Have	Have-Not	Have	Have	Have-Not	Have-Not	Have	Have-Not	Have	Have-Not	Have-Not						
Felipe	Have	Have	Have-Not	Have-Not	Have-Not	Have-Not	Have-Not	Have	Have-Not	Have-Not							
Daniel			Have	Have-Not	Have-Not	Have	Have	Have-Not	Have-Not								
Pyong	Have-Not	Have-Not	Have	Have	Have	Have	Have	Have-Not									
Victor Hugo	Have-Not	Have	Have	Have-Not	Have-Not	Have-Not	Have-Not										
Guilherme	Have	Have	Have	Have	Have-Not	Have-Not											
Bianca	Have	Have	Have-Not	Have	Have-Not												
Lucas	Have	Have	Have-Not	Have-Not													
Hadson	Have-Not	Have	Have-Not														
Petrix	Have	Have-Not															
Chumbo	Have																

== Ratings and reception ==
=== Brazilian ratings ===
All numbers are in points and provided by Kantar Ibope Media.

Week	First air date	Last air date	Timeslot (BRT)	Daily SP viewers (in points)							SP viewers (in points)	BR viewers (in points)	Ref.
Week	First air date	Last air date	Timeslot (BRT)	Mon	Tue	Wed	Thu	Fri	Sat	Sun	SP viewers (in points)	BR viewers (in points)	Ref.
1	January 21, 2020	January 26, 2020	Monday and Tuesday, Thursday to Saturday; 10:30 p.m. Wednesday; 11:45 p.m. Sunday; 11:30 p.m.	—	24.9	26.0^{1}	23.9	22.8	19.9	15.3	22.1	—N/a	
2	January 27, 2020	February 2, 2020	Monday and Tuesday, Thursday to Saturday; 10:30 p.m. Wednesday; 11:45 p.m. Sunday; 11:30 p.m.	27.0	23.2	24.5^{1}	23.1	22.7	22.6	17.6	22.5	21.3	
3	February 3, 2020	February 9, 2020	Monday and Tuesday, Thursday to Saturday; 10:30 p.m. Wednesday; 11:45 p.m. Sunday; 11:30 p.m.	26.5	25.6	14.4	25.5	23.9	21.5	21.3^{2}	23.5	22.9	
4	February 10, 2020	February 16, 2020	Monday and Tuesday, Thursday to Saturday; 10:30 p.m. Wednesday; 11:45 p.m. Sunday; 11:30 p.m.	26.1	24.5	13.9	24.1	23.3	21.7	17.9	21.6	—N/a	
5	February 17, 2020	February 23, 2020	Monday and Tuesday, Thursday to Saturday; 10:30 p.m. Wednesday; 11:45 p.m. Sunday; 11:30 p.m.	26.5	25.5	12.5	25.1	24.6	23.7	18.4^{3}	23.1	22.1	
6	February 24, 2020	March 1, 2020	Monday and Tuesday, Thursday to Saturday; 10:30 p.m. Wednesday; 11:45 p.m. Sunday; 11:30 p.m.	26.0	24.3	15.1	25.6	26.6	24.7	18.0	22.9	—N/a	
7	March 2, 2020	March 8, 2020	Monday and Tuesday, Thursday to Saturday; 10:30 p.m. Wednesday; 11:45 p.m. Sunday; 11:30 p.m.	27.2	27.5	12.6	25.7	27.2	24.7	18.6	23.4	—N/a	
8	March 9, 2020	March 15, 2020	Monday and Tuesday, Thursday to Saturday; 10:30 p.m. Wednesday; 11:45 p.m. Sunday; 11:30 p.m.	28.3	27.9	15.2	28.1	27.1	25.2	20.1	24.6	—N/a	
9	March 16, 2020	March 22, 2020	Monday to Saturday; 10:45 p.m. Sunday; 11:00 p.m.	30.3	29.4	30.2	28.5	30.5	27.8	23.4	28.3	26.7	
10	March 23, 2020	March 29, 2020	Monday to Saturday; 10:45 p.m. Sunday; 11:00 p.m.	28.6	30.6	27.3	27.0	26.7	25.7	22.4	26.9	—N/a	
11	March 30, 2020	April 5, 2020	Monday to Saturday; 10:45 p.m. Sunday; 11:00 p.m.	28.6	31.4	29.2	27.7	29.5	24.8	24.0	28.0	27.0	
12	April 6, 2020	April 12, 2020	Monday to Saturday; 10:45 p.m. Sunday; 11:00 p.m.	30.9	31.9	28.1	27.5	28.2	25.2	25.4	28.3	26.9	
13	April 13, 2020	April 19, 2020	Monday to Saturday; 10:45 p.m. Sunday; 11:00 p.m.	29.1	31.0	28.8	31.0	30.1	25.4	25.0	28.8	27.4	
14	April 20, 2020	April 26, 2020	Monday to Saturday; 10:45 p.m. Sunday; 11:00 p.m.	29.3	32.7	30.1	30.6	26.9	27.0	19.7	27.9	25.9	
15	April 27, 2020	April 27, 2020	Monday to Saturday; 10:45 p.m. Sunday; 11:00 p.m.	34.2	—	—	—	—	—	—	34.2	31.9	

- In 2020, each point represents 260.558 households in 15 market cities in Brazil (74.987 households in São Paulo).
- ^Note 1 : This episode aired on a special time at 10:30 p.m.
- ^Note 2 : This episode aired on a special time at 9:45 p.m.
- ^Note 3 : This episode aired on a special time at 8:00 p.m.
