= Flay =

Flay may refer to:

- Flaying, the removal of skin from the body

== People ==
- Flay (singer) (born 1994), Brazilian singer
- Flay Brandström (born 1986), Swedish singer
- Bobby Flay (born 1964), celebrity chef and restaurateur
- K.Flay (born 1985), American singer

== Arts, entertainment, and media ==
- Flay Allster, a fictional character in the anime Mobile Suit Gundam SEED
- Mr. Flay, a fictional character in the Gormenghast novels
