= Power Couple (Brazilian TV series) season 6 =

Power Couple
- Season 6
- Hosted by: Adriane Galisteu
- No. of days: 77
- No. of contestants: 26 (13 couples)
- Winner: Brenda & Matheus
- Runner-up: Mussunzinho & Karol
- Companion show: Power Couple Live
- No. of episodes: 64

Release
- Original network: RecordTV
- Original release: May 2 – July 14, 2022

Additional information
- Filming dates: April 29 – July 14, 2022

Season chronology
- ← Previous; Season 5 Next → Season 7

The sixth season of Power Couple premiered on Monday, May 2, 2022, at 10:30 p.m. on RecordTV.

The show features thirteen celebrity couples living under one roof and facing extreme challenges that will test how well they really know each other. Each week, a couple will be eliminated until the last couple wins the grand prize.

Adriane Galisteu returned for her second season as the main host, alongside Lidi Lisboa, who is also returning for her second season but, this time, being joined by Lucas Selfie as the show's online hosts and correspondents.

Brenda Paixão & Matheus Sampaio won the competition with 53.88% of the public vote over Mussunzinho & Karol Menezes and Adryana Ribeiro & Albert Bressan and took home the R$330.000 prize they accumulated during the show. Mussunzinho & Karol received a brand new car as the runners-up and Adryana & Albert received R$50.000.

== Cast ==
The couples were officially revealed by RecordTV on April 27, 2022.

=== Couples ===
Celebrity	Occupation	Partner	Occupation	Status
Rodrigo Mila	DJ	Daia Araújo	Hairdresser	Eliminated 1st on May 12, 2022
Dinei	Former football player	Erika Dias	Manager	Eliminated 2nd on May 19, 2022
Nahim †	Singer	Andreia Andrade	Businesswoman	Eliminated 3rd on May 26, 2022
Claudia Baronesa	Businesswoman	Rogério Alves	Businessman	Walked on May 27, 2022
Cartolouco	Journalist	Gabi Augusto	Businesswoman	Eliminated 4th on June 2, 2022
Ivy Moraes	Digital influencer	Nandinho Borges	Digital influencer	Eliminated 5th on June 16, 2022
Pe Lanza	Musician	Anne Duarte	Relationship marketing	Eliminated 6th on June 23, 2022
Michele Passa	Digital influencer	Bruno Passa	Oceanographer	Eliminated 7th on June 30, 2022
Hadballa	Football coach	Eliza Fagundes	Fitness model	Eliminated 8th on July 7, 2022
João Hadad	Digital influencer	Luana Andrade †	Model	Eliminated 9th on July 12, 2022
Adryana Ribeiro	Singer	Albert Bressan	Businessman	Third place on July 14, 2022
Mussunzinho	Actor	Karol Menezes	Publicist	Runner-up on July 14, 2022
Brenda Paixão	Digital influencer	Matheus Sampaio	Digital influencer	Winners on July 14, 2022

== Future Appearances ==
In 2022, Claudia Baronesa (from Baronesa & Rogério) appeared in A Fazenda 14, she entered in the Warehouse where the public voted for one contestant to move into the main house, she didn't receive enough votes to enter in the game.

In 2023, Brenda Paixão (from Brenda & Matheus) appeared on De Férias com o Ex Caribe: Salseiro VIP 2 as original cast member.

In 2024, Andreia Andrade (from Nahim & Andreia), Claudia Baronesa (from Baronesa & Rogério) and João Hadad (from Hadad & Luana) appeared on A Grande Conquista 2, they have to compete for a place to enter in the mansion. Andreia didn't enter, while Baronesa and Hadad won them place in the mansion. Baronesa finished in 20th place, while Hadad finished as runner-up from the game.

In 2024, Albert Bressan (Adryana & Albert) appeared in A Fazenda 16, he entered in the Warehouse where the public voted for four contestants to move into the main house, he received enough votes to enter in the game and finished in 8th place in the competition.

== The game ==
Key

Men's challenge bet	Women's challenge bet	**T** Total money combined	Passed the challenge (adds the betting sum)	Failed the challenge (deducts the betting sum)	Won couples' challenge (immunity and adds R$20.000)

=== Challenges' results ===
		Week 1	Week 2	Week 3	Week 4	Week 5	Week 6	Week 7	Week 8	Week 9	Week 10	Week 11	
		Week 1	Week 2	Week 3	Week 4	Week 5	Week 6	Week 7	Week 8	Week 9	Week 10	Day 72	Finale
Sum of money		R$40.000	R$40.000	R$40.000	R$40.000	R$40.000	R$40.000	R$40.000	R$40.000	R$40.000	R$40.000		Jackpot
Bets
Brenda & Matheus		R$008.000	R$030.000	R$038.000	R$004.000	R$025.000	R$015.000	R$022.000	R$002.000	R$019.000	R$015.000	—	R$330.000
Brenda & Matheus		R$032.000	R$044.000	R$002.000	R$022.000	R$017.000	R$025.000	R$018.000	R$004.000	R$020.000	R$015.000	—	R$330.000
Brenda & Matheus	T	~~R$016.000~~	R$114.000	R$000.000	R$014.000	R$028.000	R$050.000	R$036.000	R$038.000	~~R$001.000~~	R$050.000	Nominated	R$330.000
Mussunzinho & Karol		R$012.000	R$020.000	R$015.000	R$035.000	R$028.000	R$018.000	R$010.000	R$005.000	R$030.000	R$020.000	—	R$539.000
Mussunzinho & Karol		R$008.000	R$010.000	R$030.000	R$008.000	R$011.000	R$030.000	R$021.000	R$020.000	R$005.000	R$030.000	—	R$539.000
Mussunzinho & Karol	T	R$044.000	R$090.000	R$085.000	R$013.000	R$023.000	R$088.000	R$049.000	R$065.000	R$065.000	R$020.000	Nominated	R$539.000
Adryana & Albert		R$015.000	R$012.000	R$026.000	R$007.000	R$016.000	R$014.000	R$012.000	R$003.000	R$007.000	R$007.000	—	R$462.000
Adryana & Albert		R$015.000	R$018.000	R$066.000	R$001.000	R$010.000	R$001.000	R$010.000	R$003.000	R$008.000	R$001.000	—	R$462.000
Adryana & Albert	T	R$070.000	R$070.000	R$132.000	R$026.000	R$046.000	R$007.000	R$018.000	R$020.000	R$041.000	R$032.000	Saved	R$462.000
Hadad & Luana		R$011.000	R$018.000	R$008.000	R$015.000	R$026.000	R$019.000	R$016.000	R$012.000	R$018.000	R$010.000	—	R$330.000
Hadad & Luana		R$028.000	R$005.000	R$008.000	R$025.000	R$051.000	R$019.000	R$019.000	R$015.000	R$017.000	R$008.000	—	R$330.000
Hadad & Luana	T	R$001.000	R$027.000	R$040.000	R$030.000	R$025.000	R$078.000	R$005.000	R$057.000	R$025.000	R$042.000	Nominated	R$330.000
Hadballa & Eliza		R$022.000	R$005.000	R$014.000	R$036.000	R$020.000	R$010.000	R$020.000	R$001.000	R$001.000	R$013.000		R$567.000
Hadballa & Eliza		R$011.000	R$015.000	R$004.000	R$014.000	R$007.000	R$020.000	R$039.000	R$030.000	R$003.000	R$029.000		R$567.000
Hadballa & Eliza	T	R$027.000	R$060.000	R$068.000	R$090.000	R$027.000	R$070.000	R$059.000	R$071.000	R$038.000	R$046.000		R$567.000
Michele & Passa		R$018.000	R$017.000	R$018.000	R$008.000	R$007.000	R$001.000	R$017.000	R$004.000	R$006.000			R$472.000
Michele & Passa		R$016.000	R$022.000	R$052.000	R$017.000	R$009.000	R$002.000	R$027.000	R$013.000	R$002.000			R$472.000
Michele & Passa	T	R$074.000	R$079.000	R$110.000	R$035.000	R$014.000	R$041.000	R$050.000	R$023.000	R$046.000			R$472.000
Pe Lanza & Anne		R$014.000	R$019.000	R$019.000	R$006.000	R$013.000	R$013.000	R$013.000	R$039.000				R$422.000
Pe Lanza & Anne		R$020.000	R$014.000	R$023.000	R$021.000	R$023.000	R$022.000	R$020.000	R$001.000				R$422.000
Pe Lanza & Anne	T	R$074.000	R$073.000	R$082.000	R$013.000	R$076.000	R$095.000	R$007.000	R$002.000				R$422.000
Ivy & Nandinho		R$007.000	R$021.000	R$025.000	R$005.000	R$027.000	R$027.000	R$014.000					R$263.000
Ivy & Nandinho		R$025.000	R$012.000	R$062.000	R$034.000	R$042.000	R$013.000	R$025.000					R$263.000
Ivy & Nandinho	T	R$022.000	R$031.000	R$127.000	R$011.000	R$045.000	R$026.000	R$001.000					R$263.000
Cartolouco & Gabi		R$020.000	R$022.000	R$031.000	R$065.000	R$017.000							R$388.000
Cartolouco & Gabi		R$018.000	R$051.000	R$068.000	R$035.000	R$005.000							R$388.000
Cartolouco & Gabi	T	R$078.000	R$113.000	R$159.000	R$010.000	R$028.000							R$388.000
Baronesa & Rogério		R$009.000	R$003.000	R$020.000	R$067.000								R$148.000
Baronesa & Rogério		R$013.000	R$002.000	R$015.000	R$037.000								R$148.000
Baronesa & Rogério	T	R$018.000	R$045.000	R$075.000	R$010.000								R$148.000
Nahim & Andreia		R$001.000	R$035.000	R$010.000	R$002.000								R$083.000
Nahim & Andreia		R$034.000	R$001.000	R$014.000	R$010.000								R$083.000
Nahim & Andreia	T	R$005.000	R$006.000	R$044.000	R$028.000								R$083.000
Dinei & Erika		R$003.000	R$015.000	R$039.000									R$054.000
Dinei & Erika		R$019.000	R$011.000	R$001.000									R$054.000
Dinei & Erika	T	R$018.000	R$036.000	~~R$000.000~~									R$054.000
Mila & Daia		R$010.000	R$014.000										R$037.000
Mila & Daia		R$012.000	R$013.000										R$037.000
Mila & Daia	T	R$018.000	R$019.000										R$037.000
Notes		1	2	3	4, 5, 6	7, 8	9	10, 11	12, 13	14, 15	16, 17, 18	19	(none)
Least money (pre-challenge)		Hadad; Luana	Nahim; Andreia	Dinei; Erika	Baronesa; Rogério	Michele; Passa	Ivy; Nandinho	Ivy; Nandinho	Pe Lanza; Anne	Brenda; Matheus	Mussunzinho; Karol		
Couples' veto power (most money)		Cartolouco; Gabi	Brenda; Matheus	Cartolouco; Gabi	Hadballa; Eliza	Pe Lanza; Anne	Mussunzinho; Karol	Hadballa; Eliza	Hadballa; Eliza	Mussunzinho; Karol	Brenda; Matheus		
Vetoed from Couples' challenge		Ivy; Nandinho		Adryana; Albert	Nahim; Andreia	Adryana; Albert	Brenda; Matheus	Ivy; Nandinho	Brenda; Matheus	Hadballa; Eliza	Hadballa; Eliza		
Couples' challenge winners		Hadballa; Eliza	Mussunzinho; Karol	Cartolouco; Gabi	Michele; Passa	Ivy; Nandinho	Pe Lanza; Anne	Mussunzinho; Karol	Hadad; Luana	Hadad; Luana	Mussunzinho; Karol	Adryana; Albert	
Nominated (pre-Couple's vote)
Couples' challenge losers		Brenda; Matheus	Mila; Daia	Dinei; Erika	Adryana; Albert	Brenda; Matheus	Adryana; Albert	Adryana; Albert	Adryana; Albert	Brenda; Matheus	Brenda; Matheus		
Least money (post-challenge)		Hadad; Luana	Nahim; Andreia	Brenda; Matheus	Baronesa; Rogério	Michele; Passa	Ivy; Nandinho	Ivy; Nandinho	Pe Lanza; Anne	Hadballa; Eliza	Adryana; Albert		

==== Notes ====
- **^Note 1** : Week 1 was a non-elimination week. As a result, while Brenda & Matheus lost the Couples' challenge and Hadad & Luana ended up with the least money of the cycle, neither couple was nominated. The only punishment that Brenda & Matheus received for coming in last place in the Couples' challenge was to lose R$20.000. As they only had R$16.000 in their joint account, they lost all their money.
- **^Note 2** : Mila & Daia lost R$20.000 in their joint account for coming in last place in the Couples' challenge.
- **^Note 3** : Dinei & Erika and Hadad & Luana were tied in last place at this week's Couples' challenge as both couples quit. Per the rules, since Dinei & Erika have the least money in their overall bank account, they were nominated. Dinei & Erika would lose R$20.000 in their joint account for coming in last place in the Couples' challenge. As they only had R$0.000 in their joint account, they not lost none money.
- **^Note 4** : Hadad & Luana had to bet all their remaining jackpot in the Men's Challenge, due to the use of Dinei & Erika's inheritance power after Week 3's elimination night.
- **^Note 5** : Adryana & Albert lost R$20.000 in their joint account for coming in last place in the Couples' challenge.
- **^Note 6** : Baronesa & Rogério and Cartolouco & Gabi were tied in last place in the money rank this week with R$10.000 each. Per the rules, since Baronesa & Rogério have the least money in their overall bank account, they were nominated.
- **^Note 7** : Hadad & Luana' sum of money was increased to R$50.000, while Michele & Passa's was reduced to R$30.000, due to the use of Nahim & Andreia's inheritance power after Week 4's elimination night.
- **^Note 8** : Brenda & Matheus lost R$20.000 in their joint account for coming in last place in the Couples' challenge.
- **^Note 9** : Adryana & Albert lost R$20.000 in their joint account for coming in last place in the Couples' challenge.
- **^Note 10** : Ivy & Nandinho, as couple with the least money combined were automatically nominated, as they couldn't compete in the Couples' challenge due to being chosen by Hadballa & Eliza at the end of the Men & Women's challenges.
- **^Note 11** : Adryana & Albert lost R$20.000 in their joint account for coming in last place in the Couples' challenge.
- **^Note 12** : Pe Lanza & Anne had to bet all their jackpot in the Men's Challenge, while Hadballa & Eliza had to bet R$1.000, due to the use of Ivy & Nandinho's inheritance power after Week 7's elimination night.
- **^Note 13** : Adryana & Albert lost R$20.000 in their joint account for coming in last place in the Couples' challenge.
- **^Note 14** : Mussunzinho & Karol had to choose the value of another couple's bet in the Men's Challenge, due to the use of Pe Lanza & Anne's inheritance power after Week 8's elimination night. They chose the value of Hadballa & Eliza's bet on the Men's Challenge, which was R$1.000.
- **^Note 15** : Brenda & Matheus would lose R$20.000 in their joint account for coming in last place in the Couples' challenge. As they only had R$1.000 in their joint account, they lost all their money.
- **^Note 16** : Mussunzinho & Karol had to choose a couple to have the sum of money reduced to R$30.000, due to the use of Michele & Passa's inheritance power after Week 9's elimination night. They chose Hadballa & Eliza, which had the sum of money was reduced to R$30.000.
- **^Note 17** : Mussunzinho & Karol were immune for the money rank's nomination for being the Couples' challenge winner. However, this week's Power Couple were eligible to be nominated by the Couples' vote.
- **^Note 18** : Brenda & Matheus lost R$20.000 in their joint account for coming in last place in the Couples' challenge.
- **^Note 19** : No bets were made on this week. Instead, the final Couples' Challenge winner couple would be the first finalist of the season. Adryana & Albert won the challenge and became the first finalists of the season. Brenda & Matheus, Hadad & Luana and Mussunzinho & Karol were automatically nominated for the final elimination of the season.

=== Special power ===
Just like last season, the couples' challenge winning couple also becomes the week's Power Couple. At the nomination ceremony, the couple will randomly picked two out of three balls from different colors (black, green or pink). Then, the couple would be given a choice between two advantages in the game; the couple's choice is marked in bold.

Week	Power Couple	Advantages
2	Mussunzinho & Karol	Save a nominated couple who in turn must nominate their replacement.; **Bet R$10.000 in one of the nominated couples to be eliminated**. →**Adryana & Albert**
3	Cartolouco & Gabi	Nominate a fourth couple who in turn must save one of the three other nominated couples.; **Transfer all the votes that any couple received to another couple**. →**Mussunzinho & Karol** (4 votes canceled); **Baronesa & Rogério** (4 votes added)
4	Michele & Passa	Nominate a fourth couple who in turn must save one of the three other nominated couples.; **Nominate a fourth couple**. →**Nahim & Andreia**
5	Ivy & Nandinho	Multiply the votes received by a couple by two.; **Save a nominated couple who in turn must nominate their replacement**. →**Michele & Passa** (saved); **Cartolouco & Gabi** (replacement nominees)
6	Pe Lanza & Anne	Bet R$10.000 in one of the nominated couples to be eliminated.; **Cancel all the votes received by one couple**. →~~**Hadballa & Eliza**~~^{13}
7	Mussunzinho & Karol	Transfer all the votes that any couple received to another couple.; **Multiply the votes received by a couple by two**. →**Brenda & Matheus**
8	Hadad & Luana	Ban a couple from voting and choose a couple who must nominate two different couples.; **Cancel a couple's vote who in turn must nominate a different couple**. →**Adryana & Albert**
9	Hadad & Luana	Cancel two couple's votes.; **Give immunity to a couple**. →**Mussunzinho & Karol**
10	Mussunzinho & Karol	Cancel a couple's vote who in turn must nominate a different couple.; **Choose a couple who must nominate again**. →**Hadad & Luana**

=== Voting history ===
	Week 1	Week 2	Week 3	Week 4	Week 5	Week 6	Week 7	Week 8	Week 9	Week 10	Week 11	
	Week 1	Week 2	Week 3	Week 4	Week 5	Week 6	Week 7	Week 8	Week 9	Week 10	Day 74	Finale
Power Couple	Hadballa; Eliza	Mussunzinho; Karol	Cartolouco; Gabi	Michele; Passa	Ivy; Nandinho	Pe Lanza; Anne	Mussunzinho; Karol	Hadad; Luana	Hadad; Luana	Mussunzinho; Karol	Adryana; Albert	(none)
Nominated (Challenge)	(none)	Mila; Daia	Dinei; Erika	Adryana; Albert	Brenda; Matheus	Adryana; Albert	Adryana; Albert	Adryana; Albert	Brenda; Matheus	Brenda; Matheus	(none)	(none)
Nominated (Least money)	(none)	Nahim; Andreia	Brenda; Matheus	Baronesa; Rogério	~~Michele~~; ~~Passa~~	Ivy; Nandinho	Ivy; Nandinho	Pe Lanza; Anne	Hadballa; Eliza	Adryana; Albert	(none)	(none)
Nominated (Least money)	(none)	Nahim; Andreia	Brenda; Matheus	Baronesa; Rogério	Cartolouco; Gabi	Ivy; Nandinho	Ivy; Nandinho	Pe Lanza; Anne	Hadballa; Eliza	Adryana; Albert	(none)	(none)
Nominated (Couples' vote)	(none)	Adryana; Albert	Baronesa; Rogério	Brenda; Matheus	Adryana; Albert	Brenda; Matheus	Brenda; Matheus	Brenda; Matheus	Michele; Passa	Hadballa; Eliza	(none)	(none)
Brenda & Matheus	Pe Lanza; Anne	Dinei; Erika	~~Mussunzinho~~; ~~Karol~~; Baronesa; Rogério	Hadad; Luana	Hadballa; Eliza	~~Hadballa~~; ~~Eliza~~	Hadballa; Eliza	Hadballa; Eliza	Michele; Passa	Mussunzinho; Karol	Nominated	**Winners** (Day 77)
Mussunzinho & Karol	Pe Lanza; Anne	Adryana; Albert ^{(×2)}	Baronesa; Rogério	Brenda; Matheus	Adryana; Albert	Brenda; Matheus	Brenda; Matheus ^{(×2)}	Brenda; Matheus	Adryana; Albert	Hadballa; Eliza ^{(×2)}	Nominated	**Runner-up** (Day 77)
Adryana & Albert	Baronesa; Rogério	Hadballa; Eliza	~~Mussunzinho~~; ~~Karol~~; Baronesa; Rogério	Hadad; Luana	Cartolouco; Gabi	~~Hadballa~~; ~~Eliza~~	Hadballa; Eliza	~~Hadballa~~; ~~Eliza~~; Michele; Passa	Michele; Passa	Mussunzinho; Karol	Exempt	**Third place** (Day 77)
Hadad & Luana	Pe Lanza; Anne	Dinei; Erika	Michele; Passa	Cartolouco; Gabi	Adryana; Albert	Brenda; Matheus	Brenda; Matheus ^{(×2)}	Brenda; Matheus	Michele; Passa	Hadballa; Eliza; Hadballa; Eliza	Nominated	Eliminated (Day 75)
Hadballa & Eliza	Baronesa; Rogério	Adryana; Albert	Nahim; Andreia	Brenda; Matheus	Adryana; Albert	Brenda; Matheus	Brenda; Matheus ^{(×2)}	Brenda; Matheus	Michele; Passa	Mussunzinho; Karol	Eliminated (Day 70)	
Michele & Passa	Pe Lanza; Anne	Adryana; Albert	Nahim; Andreia	Brenda; Matheus	Adryana; Albert	Hadad; Luana	Brenda; Matheus ^{(×2)}	Brenda; Matheus	Adryana; Albert	Eliminated (Day 63)		
Pe Lanza & Anne	Nominated	Adryana; Albert	Baronesa; Rogério	Brenda; Matheus	Adryana; Albert	~~Hadballa~~; ~~Eliza~~	Brenda; Matheus ^{(×2)}	Brenda; Matheus	Eliminated (Day 56)			
Ivy & Nandinho	Pe Lanza; Anne	Dinei; Erika	~~Mussunzinho~~; ~~Karol~~; Baronesa; Rogério	Brenda; Matheus	Cartolouco; Gabi	~~Hadballa~~; ~~Eliza~~	Hadballa; Eliza	Eliminated (Day 49)				
Cartolouco & Gabi	Pe Lanza; Anne	Adryana; Albert	Baronesa; Rogério	Brenda; Matheus	Adryana; Albert	Eliminated (Day 35)						
Baronesa & Rogério	Nominated	Dinei; Erika	~~Mussunzinho~~; ~~Karol~~; Baronesa; Rogério	Hadad; Luana	Walked (Day 29)							
Nahim & Andreia	Pe Lanza; Anne	Hadballa; Eliza	Baronesa; Rogério	Brenda; Matheus	Eliminated (Day 28)							
Dinei & Erika	Pe Lanza; Anne	Ivy; Nandinho	Baronesa; Rogério	Eliminated (Day 21)								
Mila & Daia	Baronesa; Rogério	Dinei; Erika	Eliminated (Day 14)									
Notes	1	2, 3	4, 5, 6	7, 8	9, 10, 11	12, 13	14	15	16	17, 18	19	20
Walked	(none)				**Baronesa**; **Rogério**	(none)						
Sent to elimination	(none)	Adryana; Albert	Baronesa; Rogério	Adryana; Albert	Adryana; Albert	Adryana; Albert	Adryana; Albert	Adryana; Albert	Brenda; Matheus	Adryana; Albert	Brenda; Matheus	Adryana; Albert
Sent to elimination	(none)	Adryana; Albert	Baronesa; Rogério	Baronesa; Rogério	Adryana; Albert	Adryana; Albert	Adryana; Albert	Adryana; Albert	Brenda; Matheus	Adryana; Albert	Brenda; Matheus	Adryana; Albert
Sent to elimination	(none)	Mila; Daia	Brenda; Matheus	Baronesa; Rogério	Brenda; Matheus	Brenda; Matheus	Brenda; Matheus	Brenda; Matheus	Hadballa; Eliza	Brenda; Matheus	Hadad; Luana	Brenda; Matheus
Sent to elimination	(none)	Mila; Daia	Brenda; Matheus	Brenda; Matheus	Brenda; Matheus	Brenda; Matheus	Brenda; Matheus	Brenda; Matheus	Hadballa; Eliza	Brenda; Matheus	Hadad; Luana	Brenda; Matheus
Sent to elimination	(none)	Nahim; Andreia	Dinei; Erika	Brenda; Matheus	Cartolouco; Gabi	Ivy; Nandinho	Ivy; Nandinho	Pe Lanza; Anne	Michele; Passa	Hadballa; Eliza	Mussunzinho; Karol	Mussunzinho; Karol
Sent to elimination	(none)	Nahim; Andreia	Dinei; Erika	Nahim; Andreia	Cartolouco; Gabi	Ivy; Nandinho	Ivy; Nandinho	Pe Lanza; Anne	Michele; Passa	Hadballa; Eliza	Mussunzinho; Karol	Mussunzinho; Karol
Eliminated	**Pe Lanza**; **Anne**; 8 of 11 votes to win a car	**Mila**; **Daia**; 22.28% to save	**Dinei**; **Erika**; 18.20% to save	**Nahim**; **Andreia**; 18.13% to save	**Cartolouco**; **Gabi**; 15.63% to save	Elimination cancelled	**Ivy**; **Nandinho**; 14.99% to save	**Pe Lanza**; **Anne**; 11.41% to save	**Michele**; **Passa**; 22.20% to save	**Hadballa**; **Eliza**; 18.17% to save	**Hadad**; **Luana**; 11.89% to save	**Adryana**; **Albert**; 19.23% to win
Eliminated	**Pe Lanza**; **Anne**; 8 of 11 votes to win a car	**Mila**; **Daia**; 22.28% to save	**Dinei**; **Erika**; 18.20% to save	**Nahim**; **Andreia**; 18.13% to save	**Cartolouco**; **Gabi**; 15.63% to save	Elimination cancelled	**Ivy**; **Nandinho**; 14.99% to save	**Pe Lanza**; **Anne**; 11.41% to save	**Michele**; **Passa**; 22.20% to save	**Hadballa**; **Eliza**; 18.17% to save	**Hadad**; **Luana**; 11.89% to save	**Mussunzinho**; **Karol**; 26.89% to win
Saved	**Baronesa**; **Rogério**; 3 of 11 votes to win a car	**Nahim**; **Andreia**; 28.64% to save	**Baronesa**; **Rogério**; 32.20% to save	**Adryana**; **Albert**; 24.38% to save	**Adryana**; **Albert**; 41.48% to save	Elimination cancelled	**Adryana**; **Albert**; 29.44% to save	**Adryana**; **Albert**; 26.68% to save	**Hadballa**; **Eliza**; 24.96% to save	**Adryana**; **Albert**; 29.24% to save	**Brenda**; **Matheus**; Most votes to save	**Brenda**; **Matheus**; 53.88% to win
Saved	**Baronesa**; **Rogério**; 3 of 11 votes to win a car	**Nahim**; **Andreia**; 28.64% to save	**Baronesa**; **Rogério**; 32.20% to save	**Brenda**; **Matheus**; 25.95% to save	**Adryana**; **Albert**; 41.48% to save	Elimination cancelled	**Adryana**; **Albert**; 29.44% to save	**Adryana**; **Albert**; 26.68% to save	**Hadballa**; **Eliza**; 24.96% to save	**Adryana**; **Albert**; 29.24% to save	**Brenda**; **Matheus**; Most votes to save	**Brenda**; **Matheus**; 53.88% to win
Saved	**Baronesa**; **Rogério**; 3 of 11 votes to win a car	**Adryana**; **Albert**; 49.08% to save	**Brenda**; **Matheus**; 49.60% to save	**Brenda**; **Matheus**; 25.95% to save	**Brenda**; **Matheus**; 42.89% to save	Elimination cancelled	**Brenda**; **Matheus**; 55.57% to save	**Brenda**; **Matheus**; 61.91% to save	**Brenda**; **Matheus**; 52.84% to save	**Brenda**; **Matheus**; 52.59% to save	**Mussunzinho**; **Karol**; Most votes to save	**Brenda**; **Matheus**; 53.88% to win
Saved	**Baronesa**; **Rogério**; 3 of 11 votes to win a car	**Adryana**; **Albert**; 49.08% to save	**Brenda**; **Matheus**; 49.60% to save	**Baronesa**; **Rogério**; 31.54% to save	**Brenda**; **Matheus**; 42.89% to save	Elimination cancelled	**Brenda**; **Matheus**; 55.57% to save	**Brenda**; **Matheus**; 61.91% to save	**Brenda**; **Matheus**; 52.84% to save	**Brenda**; **Matheus**; 52.59% to save	**Mussunzinho**; **Karol**; Most votes to save	**Brenda**; **Matheus**; 53.88% to win

==== Notes ====
- **^Note 1** : Week 1 was a non-elimination week. On premiere night (Day 4), all couples took part in activity which ended up determining the three couples (Baronesa & Rogério, Mussunzinho & Karol and Pe Lanza & Anne) who would compete in a Special challenge for a chance to win a car. On Day 6, Mussunzinho & Karol lost the challenge thus, sending Baronesa & Rogério and Pe Lanza & Anne to face a live Special couples' vote on elimination night. Pe Lanza & Anne ended up winning the car by an 8–3 vote on Day 7.
- **^Note 2** : Brenda & Matheus ended up with the most money this week, and won immunity.
- **^Note 3** : Adryana & Albert and Dinei & Erika were tied with five votes each. Mussunzinho & Karol, as this week's Power Couple, had the casting vote and chose Adryana & Albert to be the third nominees.
- **^Note 4** : Hadad & Luana were immune this week, due to the use of Mila & Daia's inheritance power after Week 2's elimination night.
- **^Note 5** : Adryana & Albert ended up with the most money this week, and won immunity.
- **^Note 6** : After the couples' vote, Cartolouco & Gabi used their special power to transfer four votes received by Mussunzinho & Karol (from Adryana & Albert, Baronesa & Rogério, Brenda & Matheus and Ivy & Nandinho) to Baronesa & Rogério, increasing their nominations total to nine, thus making them the third nominees.
- **^Note 7** : Hadballa & Eliza ended up with the most money this week, and won immunity.
- **^Note 8** : After the couples' vote, Michele & Passa used their Special power to choice a couple to be the forth nominee. They chose Nahim & Andreia to be the forth nominees.
- **^Note 9** : On Day 29, Baronesa & Rogério walked from the competition after Rogério threatened Cartolouco's physical integrity during an altercation. Following the events, production also confirmed that, if they had not asked to leave, the couple would have been disqualified from the competition anyway.
- **^Note 10** : Pe Lanza & Anne ended up with the most money this week, and won immunity.
- **^Note 11** : After the couples' vote, Ivy & Nandinho used their Special power to directly save one of the three nominated couples, who in turn had to nominate their replacement. They chose Michele & Passa, who in turn nominated Cartolouco & Gabi as their replacements.
- **^Note 12** : After the couples' vote, Pe Lanza & Anne used their Special power to cancelled all the votes received by Hadballa & Eliza, thus making Brenda & Matheus (the couple who received the second most votes) the third nominees instead.
- **^Note 13** : On Day 42, the public vote was suspended in the afternoon after production reviewed footage of Anne whispering to Karol during the commercial break of the nomination ceremony, which was against the rules. As result, during elimination night, the power was cancelled and so was this week's elimination as well.
- **^Note 14** : After the couples' vote, Mussunzinho & Karol used their Special power to multiply by two all the votes received by Brenda & Matheus, increasing their nominations total to ten.
- **^Note 15** : After the couples' vote, Hadad & Luana used their Special power to cancel Adryana & Albert's vote on Hadballa & Eliza. Then, Adryana & Albert had to nominate again a different couple. They chose Michele & Passa.
- **^Note 16** : Before the couples' vote, Hadad & Luana used their Special power to give immunity to Mussunzinho & Karol.
- **^Note 17** : After the couples' vote, Mussunzinho & Karol used their Special power to make Hadad & Luana vote again. They voted in Hadballa & Eliza for the second time.
- **^Note 18** : Hadballa & Eliza and Mussunzinho & Karol were tied with three votes each. Mussunzinho & Karol, as this week's Power Couple, had the casting vote and chose Hadballa & Eliza to be the third nominees.
- **^Note 19** : On week 11, the final four couples competed in the final Couples' challenge for place in the final. Adryana & Albert were winners and became the first finalists of the season. Brenda & Matheus, Hadad & Luana and Mussunzinho & Karol were automatically nominated for the final elimination of the season.
- **^Note 20** : For the final, the public votes for the couple they want to win Power Couple Brasil 6.

=== Inheritance power ===
As the previous season, each eliminated couple will be entitled to an "inheritance". The couple must to delegate, in advance, which couples would hold the Golden ball which will unleash good and bad consequences in the upcoming cycle, with one of the powers defined by the public through the show's profile on R7.com among two options.

Week	Eliminated Couple	Consequences
2	**Mila & Daia**	**1** This couple is immune this cycle. →**Hadad & Luana**
3	**Dinei & Erika**	**1** This couple has to bet all their money in the second challenge of the cycle. →**Hadad & Luana**
4	**Nahim & Andreia**	**1** This couple earned a R$10.000 bonus to bet this cycle. →**Hadad & Luana**; **2** This couple lost a R$10.000 bonus to bet this cycle. →**Michele & Passa**
5	**Cartolouco & Gabi**	**1** This couple will earn only half of the money they bet in case they win the first challenge of the cycle. →**Michele & Passa**
6	(none)	**1** This couple has to bet half of their money in the first challenge of the cycle. →**Cancelled**^{13}
7	**Ivy & Nandinho**	**1** This couple has to bet all their money in the first challenge of the cycle. →**Pe Lanza & Anne**; **2** This couple has to bet R$1.000 on the first challenge of the cycle. →**Hadballa & Eliza**
8	**Pe Lanza & Anne**	**1** This couple must choose the value of another couple's bet in the first challenge of the cycle. →**Mussunzinho & Karol**
9	**Michele & Passa**	**1** This couple must choose another couple to lose a R$10.000 bonus to bet this cycle. →**Mussunzinho & Karol**

=== Room status ===
	Week 1	Week 2	Week 3	Week 4	Week 5	Week 6	Week 7	Week 8	Week 9	Week 10	Week 11	
	Week 1	Week 2	Week 3	Week 4	Week 5	Week 6	Week 7	Week 8	Week 9	Week 10	Day 70	Finale
**Seabed** **(Power suite)**	Adryana; Albert	Hadballa; Eliza	Mussunzinho; Karol	Cartolouco; Gabi	Michele; Passa	Ivy; Nandinho	Pe Lanza; Anne	Mussunzinho; Karol	Hadad; Luana	Hadad; Luana	Mussunzinho; Karol	Mussunzinho; Karol
**Desert** **suite**	Cartolouco; Gabi	Mussunzinho; Karol	Michele; Passa	Baronesa; Rogério	Hadballa; Eliza	Hadballa; Eliza	Hadad; Luana	Pe Lanza; Anne	Adryana; Albert	Hadballa; Eliza	Brenda; Matheus	Brenda; Matheus
**Mountain** **suite**	Hadad; Luana	Baronesa; Rogério	Pe Lanza; Anne	Hadballa; Eliza	Pe Lanza; Anne	Hadad; Luana	Mussunzinho; Karol	Michele; Passa	Mussunzinho; Karol	Brenda; Matheus	Adryana; Albert	Adryana; Albert
**Northern lights** **suite**	Ivy; Nandinho	Ivy; Nandinho	Baronesa; Rogério	Brenda; Matheus	Mussunzinho; Karol	Adryana; Albert	Michele; Passa	Hadballa; Eliza	Michele; Passa	Mussunzinho; Karol	Hadad; Luana	
**Swamp** **suite**	Mussunzinho; Karol	Cartolouco; Gabi	Nahim; Andreia	Pe Lanza; Anne	Ivy; Nandinho	Michele; Passa	Hadballa; Eliza	Hadad; Luana	Hadballa; Eliza			
**Jungle**	Hadballa; Eliza	Pe Lanza; Anne	Cartolouco; Gabi	Michele; Passa	Hadad; Luana	Mussunzinho; Karol	Adryana; Albert	Adryana; Albert				
**Waterfall**	Nahim; Andreia	Michele; Passa	Hadballa; Eliza	Mussunzinho; Karol	Cartolouco; Gabi	Brenda; Matheus	Ivy; Nandinho					
**Glacier**	Dinei; Erika	Dinei; Erika	Hadad; Luana	Ivy; Nandinho	Adryana; Albert							
**Savannah**	Baronesa; Rogério	Hadad; Luana	Ivy; Nandinho	Nahim; Andreia								
**Cave** **(Squeeze)**	Michele; Passa	Mila; Daia	Dinei; Erika	Hadad; Luana	Brenda; Matheus	Pe Lanza; Anne	Brenda; Matheus	Brenda; Matheus	Brenda; Matheus	Adryana; Albert		
Living room	Pe Lanza; Anne	Nahim; Andreia	Adryana; Albert	Adryana; Albert								
Living room	Mila; Daia	Brenda; Matheus	Brenda; Matheus									
**Tent**	Brenda; Matheus	Adryana; Albert										

== Ratings and reception ==
=== Brazilian ratings ===
All numbers are in points and provided by Kantar Ibope Media.

Week	First air date	Last air date	Timeslot (BRT)	Daily SP viewers (in points)						SP viewers (in points)	BR viewers (in points)	Ref.
Week	First air date	Last air date	Timeslot (BRT)	Mon	Tue	Wed	Thu	Fri	Sat	SP viewers (in points)	BR viewers (in points)	Ref.
1	May 2, 2022	May 7, 2022	Monday to Saturday; 10:30 p.m.	5.2	5.6	4.7	5.6	4.9	3.5	4.9	Outside top 10	
2	May 9, 2022	May 14, 2022	Monday to Saturday; 10:30 p.m.	5.3	4.7	6.1	4.8	5.6	3.9	5.1	Outside top 10	
3	May 16, 2022	May 21, 2022	Monday to Saturday; 10:30 p.m.	4.9	4.6	5.4	4.9	4.8	3.5	4.7	Outside top 10	
4	May 23, 2022	May 28, 2022	Monday to Saturday; 10:30 p.m.	5.1	4.9	4.5	5.1	6.1	3.5	4.9	Outside top 10	
5	May 30, 2022	June 4, 2022	Monday to Saturday; 10:30 p.m.	5.4	5.2	4.8	5.7	5.1	3.1	4.9	Outside top 10	
6	June 6, 2022	June 11, 2022	Monday to Saturday; 10:30 p.m.	5.2	4.8	5.8	5.2	4.8	3.4	4.9	Outside top 10	
7	June 13, 2022	June 18, 2022	Monday to Saturday; 10:30 p.m.	5.0	5.2	5.2	5.2	4.7	3.4	4.8	Outside top 10	
8	June 20, 2022	June 25, 2022	Monday to Saturday; 10:30 p.m.	5.0	5.2	5.2	5.2	4.7	3.4	4.8	Outside top 10	
9	June 27, 2022	July 2, 2022	Monday to Saturday; 10:30 p.m.	4.5	5.0	5.8	4.7	5.1	3.5	4.8	Outside top 10	
10	July 4, 2022	July 9, 2022	Monday to Saturday; 10:30 p.m.	4.6	5.1	5.4	5.2	4.4	3.8	4.8	Outside top 10	
11	July 11, 2022	July 14, 2022	Monday to Saturday; 10:30 p.m.	5.1	4.7	4.2	5.7	—	—	4.9	Outside top 10	

- In 2022, each point represents 258.821 households in 15 market cities in Brazil (74.666 households in São Paulo).
