= Carlinhos Maia =

Brazilian influencer (born 1991)

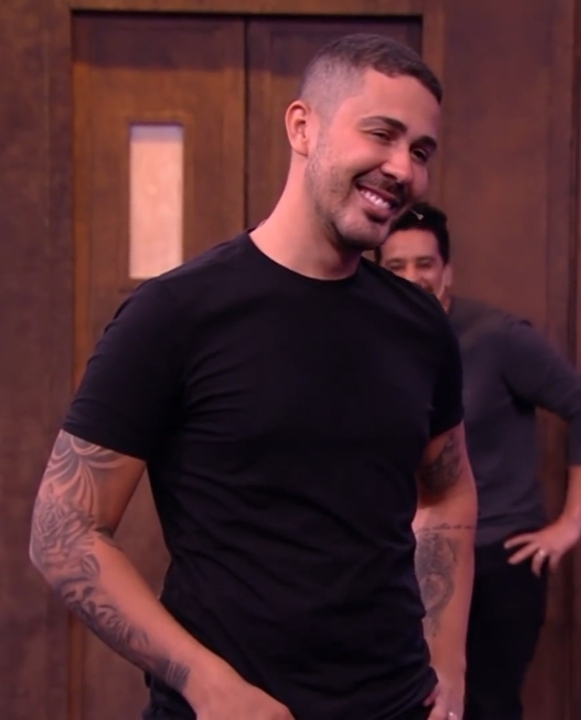
- Carlinhos Maia in 2020
- Born: Luiz Carlos Ferreira dos Santos; June 12, 1991 (age 35); Penedo, Alagoas, Brazil
- Occupations: Influencer, comedian, actor, businessman
- Spouse: Lucas Guimarães (m. 2019; div. 2025)

Instagram information
- Page: Carlinhos Maia
- Genre: Comedy
- Followers: 36 million

YouTube information
- Channel: Carlinhos Maia
- Genre: Comedy
- Subscribers: 2.06 million
- Views: 73 million
- Last updated: April 8, 2026

Luiz Carlos Ferreira dos Santos (born June 12, 1991), better known as Carlinhos Maia, is a Brazilian influencer, comedian, actor, and businessman. He rose to prominence after posting humorous videos about the neighborhood where he lived in Penedo, Alagoas, establishing himself as one of the leading personalities on Instagram in Brazil, with his account currently boasting over 36 million followers. He is also known for hosting the reality show Rancho do Maia since 2019, which is broadcast on Instagram and typically features ordinary individuals aspiring to achieve online fame.

== Biography ==
Luiz Carlos Ferreira dos Santos was born on June 12, 1991, in Penedo, Alagoas, into a humble family. At just two days old, he was adopted by the couple Maria das Graças and Virgílio Maia. In 2016, he began posting humorous videos on social media, initially on Facebook, where he showcased his daily life in Vila Primavera, a poor neighborhood, featuring people from his community and his mother's domestic work, all with a distinctly Northeastern Brazilian humor. Following his rise to fame, the neighborhood became a tourist attraction in Penedo. In 2018, he ranked second in the global ranking of the most-viewed stories on Instagram, behind only Kim Kardashian.

In February 2019, he publicly came out as homosexual and revealed that he had been in a relationship for nearly ten years with fellow influencer Lucas Guimarães, to whom he was united in a civil ceremony in May of the same year. In October 2022, the couple announced their separation but reconciled in January 2023. However, in July 2025, the couple announced their definitive separation.

Since 2019, Carlinhos Maia has hosted the reality show Rancho do Maia, which is broadcast exclusively on Instagram. The show features minor celebrities and ordinary individuals who dream of achieving fame on the internet. However, Maia has been accused of exploiting people with disabilities and those in vulnerable social situations to generate engagement in social media. An emblematic case of this gained traction on social media regarding a supposed decision by the Public Prosecutor's Office of the State of Amazonas to institutionalize Patixa Teló, a transgender woman with Down syndrome who is one of the participants on his reality show.
