= Too Hot to Handle: Brazil =

2021 Netflix reality series

- Genre: Reality competition; Dating show
- Created by: Laura Gibson; Charlie Bennett
- Based on: Too Hot to Handle
- Presented by: Letícia Quinto as Lana
- Narrated by: Bruna Louise
- Country of origin: Brazil
- Original language: Portuguese
- No. of series: 2
- No. of episodes: 16

Production
- Production locations: Tibau do Sul, Brazil
- Running time: 54–65 minutes

Original release
- Network: Netflix
- Release: 21 July 2021 – 5 October 2022

Too Hot to Handle: Brazil (Portuguese: Brincando com Fogo: Brasil; Literally: Playing with Fire: Brazil) is a Brazilian reality television dating game show based on the American–British series of the same name, which premiered on Netflix on July 21, 2021, as part of a two-week event.

Hosted by a virtual assistant named "Lana", the show revolves around 10 contestants – all of whom primarily engage in meaningless flings and are unable to form long-lasting relationships – who are placed together in a house for four weeks and must go through various workshops, all while being forbidden from any kissing, sexual contact or self-gratification, with the monetary prize getting reduced any time a rule is broken.

Netflix renewed Too Hot to Handle: Brazil for a second season on November 23, 2021. Netflix then first released Season 2 on September 28, 2022.

== Premise ==
Hosted by a cone-shaped virtual assistant named "Lana", the show revolves around 10 contestants – all of whom primarily engage in meaningless flings and are unable to form long-lasting relationships – who are placed together in a house for four weeks. While there, the contestants must go through various workshops, all while being forbidden from any kissing, sexual contact or self-gratification. The idea behind this is to foster genuine connections between the participants. The contestants start with a R$500,000 grand prize that gets reduced any time a rule is broken.

Each season starts with 10 new contestants, although later new additions occasionally join throughout. Similarly, contestants who are unable to form connections in the house or commit to the process are sometimes kicked out.

== Contestants ==
=== Season 1 ===
Cast member	Age	Hometown	Entered	Exited	Status	Refs
Ana Clara Sena	24	Belo Horizonte	Episode 7	Episode 8	Winner	
Brenda Paixão	24	Porto Alegre	Episode 1	Episode 8	Winner	
Caio Giovani	29	Rio de Janeiro	Episode 3	Episode 8	Winner	
Davi Kneip	21	Belo Horizonte	Episode 1	Episode 8	Winner	
Igor Paes	27	Salvador	Episode 1	Episode 8	Winner	
Kethellen Avelino	22	Maraã	Episode 1	Episode 8	Winner	
Leandro David	23	Brasília	Episode 1	Episode 8	Winner	
Marina Streit	24	Taquara	Episode 3	Episode 8	Winner	
Matheus Sampaio	25	Rio de Janeiro	Episode 1	Episode 8	Winner	
Rita Tiecher	25	Rio de Janeiro	Episode 1	Episode 8	Winner	
Ronaldo Moura	29	São Paulo	Episode 1	Episode 8	Winner	
Thuany Raquel	26	Recife	Episode 1	Episode 8	Winner	
Bruno Bachur	29	Belo Horizonte	Episode 7	Episode 8	Walked	
Gabriela Martins	27	Rio de Janeiro	Episode 1	Episode 6	Eliminated	

=== Season 2 ===
Cast member	Age	Hometown	Entered	Exited	Status	Refs
Gabriel Veiga	23	Salvador	Episode 2	Episode 8	Winner	
Isadora Salles	21	São Paulo	Episode 1	Episode 8	Winner	
Italo Lopes	21	Salvador	Episode 1	Episode 8	Winner	
Ivan Almeida	22	Salvador	Episode 1	Episode 8	Winner	
Justen Nosoliny	26	Rio de Janeiro	Episode 1	Episode 8	Winner	
Kelvin Duran	28	Niterói	Episode 1	Episode 8	Winner	
Lucas Di Mothe	—N/a	Rio de Janeiro	Episode 6	Episode 8	Winner	
Nayara Colombo	23	Campo Grande	Episode 1	Episode 8	Winner	
Paulo Jesus	—N/a	Salvador	Episode 6	Episode 8	Winner	
Sandri Oliveira	21	Florianópolis	Episode 1	Episode 8	Winner	
Thalyta Vasconcelos	—N/a	Teresina	Episode 6	Episode 8	Winner	
Thay Gonçalves	26	Vitória	Episode 2	Episode 8	Winner	
Victoria Macan	24	São Francisco de Paula	Episode 1	Episode 8	Winner	
Lara Tedesco	—N/a	Juiz de Fora	Episode 6	Episode 6	Eliminated	
Khiara Italia	20	Porto Alegre	Episode 1	Episode 6	Eliminated	
Wálison Gomes	25	Belo Horizonte	Episode 1	Episode 6	Eliminated	

=== Future appearances ===
In 2022, Brenda Paixão and Matheus Sampaio appeared as a couple in Power Couple Brasil 6. They won the competition.

In 2023, Ronaldo Moura and Victória Macan appeared on A Grande Conquista 1, Moura have to compete for a place to enter in the mansion and he didn't enter, while Macan received enough votes to enter in the game and finished the game in 11th place.

== Episodes ==
=== Series overview ===
Season	Episodes	Originally released	
Season	Episodes	First released	Last released
1	8	July 21, 2021	July 28, 2021
2	8	September 28, 2022	October 5, 2022

=== Season 1 (2021) ===
No. overall	No. in season	Title	Original release date
Week 1
1	1	"A Clueless Bunch"	July 21, 2021
2	2	"Hormones Run Amok"	July 21, 2021
3	3	"Hot Mess"	July 21, 2021
4	4	"Well That Escalated Quickly"	July 21, 2021
Week 2
5	5	"Forbidden"	July 28, 2021
6	6	"Nectar of the Gods"	July 28, 2021
7	7	"Fidelity Test"	July 28, 2021
8	8	"I Don't Know How to Say Goodbye"	July 28, 2021

=== Season 2 (2022) ===
No. overall	No. in season	Title	Original release date
Week 1
9	1	"Conquerors of Paradise"	September 28, 2022
10	2	"Testing Limits"	September 28, 2022
11	3	"Jealousy, Gossip, and Intrigue"	September 28, 2022
12	4	"Friendship or Money?"	September 28, 2022
Week 2
13	5	"Temptation Boat"	October 5, 2022
14	6	"Broke and Horny"	October 5, 2022
15	7	"Where's Lana?"	October 5, 2022
16	8	"Mystery Suite"	October 5, 2022

== Release ==
The trailer for Too Hot to Handle: Brazil was released on June 30, 2021. With the trailer, it was announced that the eight-episode first season would be released on a two-week schedule: the first four episodes were released on July 21, 2021, while the final four on July 28.
