= Thelma Assis =

Brazilian reporter and presenter (born 1984)

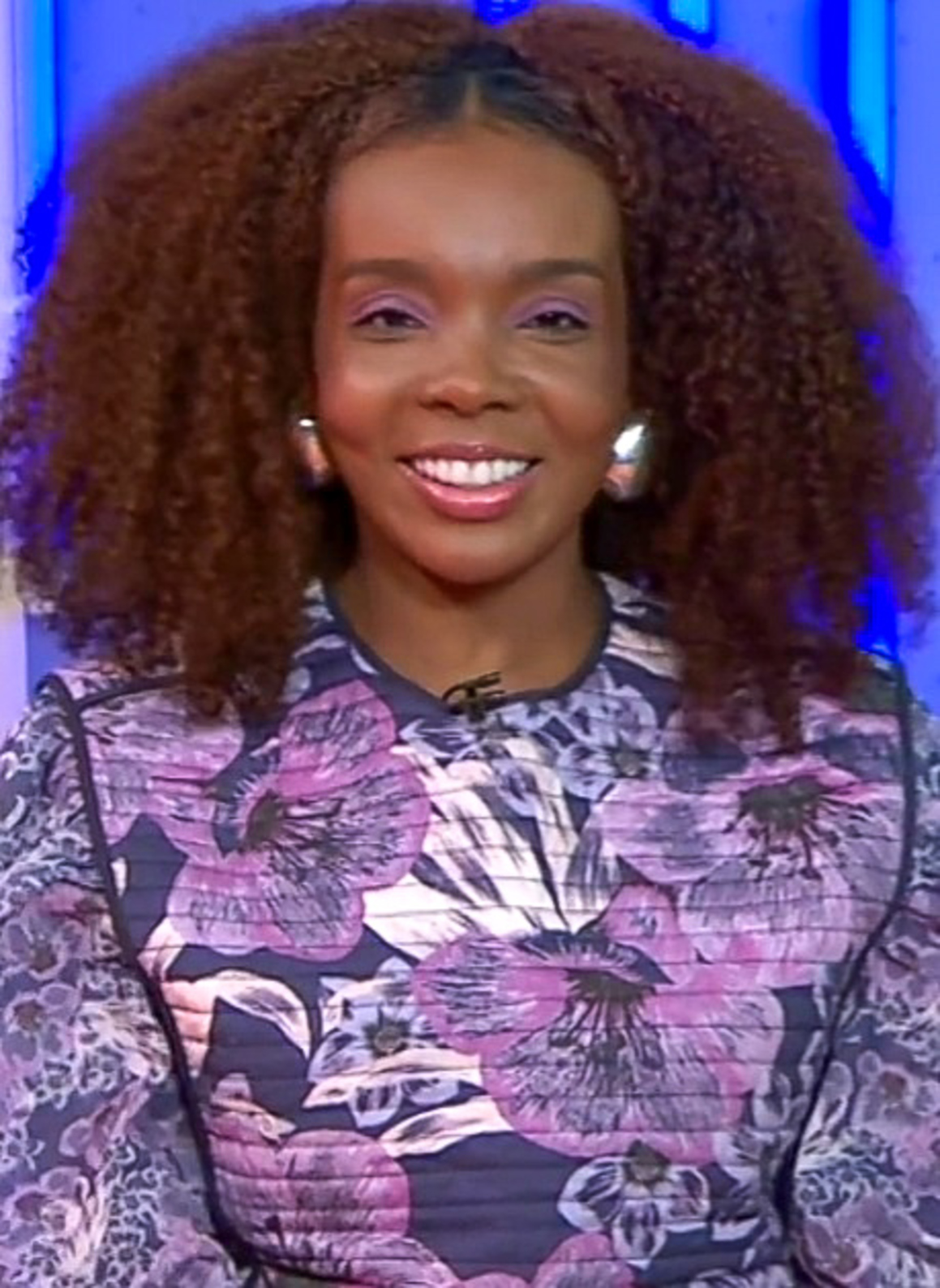
- Born: Thelma Regina Maria Assis dos Santos; 18 November 1984 (age 41); São Paulo, Brazil
- Occupations: Doctor, presenter, dancer
- Years active: 2011–present
- Television: Big Brother Brasil; Bem Estar
- Spouse: Denis Cordeiro (m. 2016)

Thelma Regina Maria dos Santos Assis (born 18 November 1984, in São Paulo, Brazil) is a Brazilian doctor, television presenter, dancer and digital influencer. She is known for being the winner of the 20th season of Big Brother Brasil.

== Early life ==
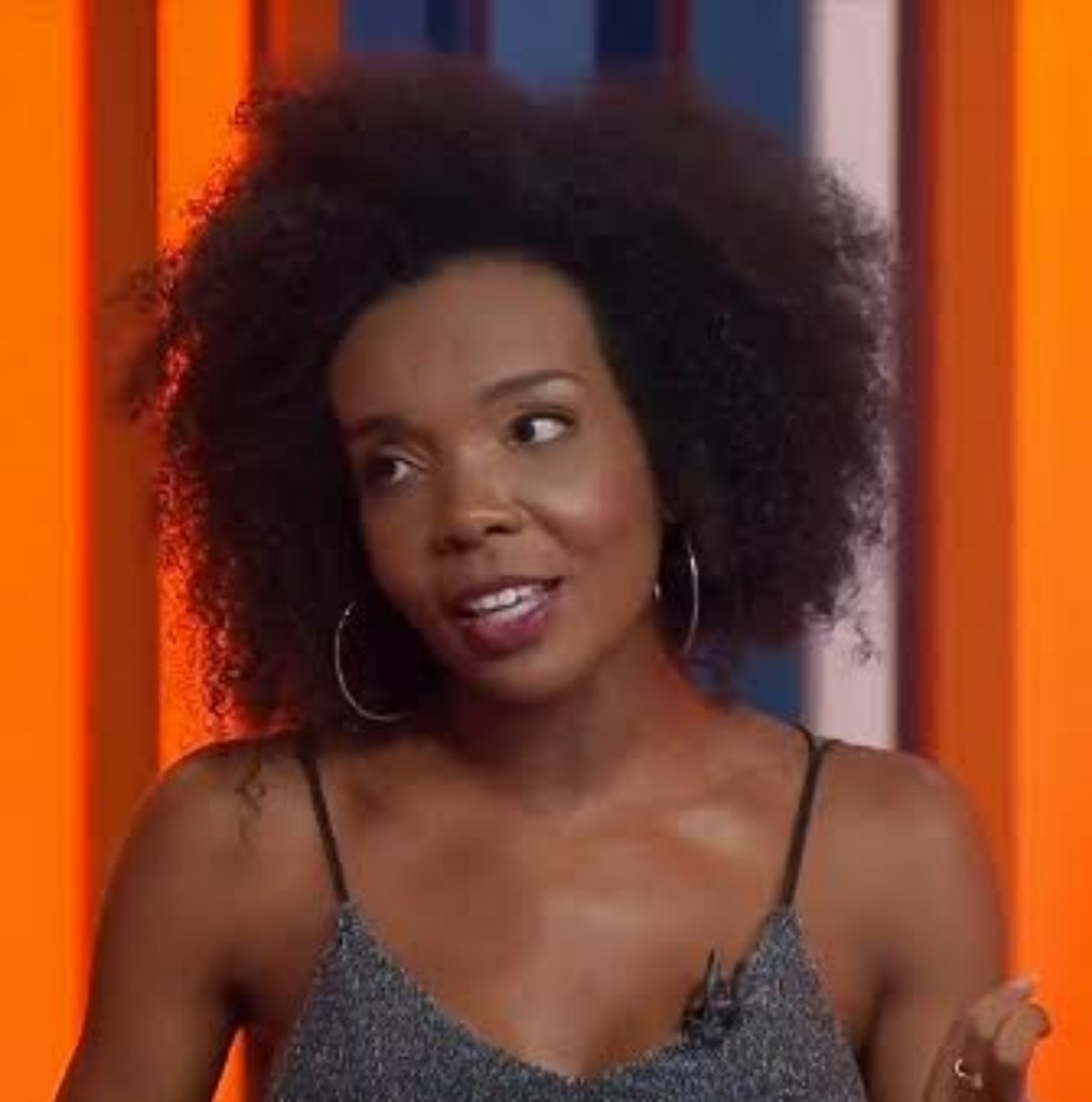
Assis during "A Eliminação" on 28 April 2020

Born in a suburb of São Paulo on 18 November 1984, Thelma Assis was adopted at the age of three days by civil servant Yara Assis and graphic artist Carlos Alberto Assis. Thelma's mother said "She came to me fragile and rickety. So much so that if she was in a nursery for adoption, no one would want her." Thelma's mother planned to reveal the adoption when her daughter turned 18, but Thelma ended up finding out at 15 through an anonymous call.

Assis studied ballet from the age of 7 to 22 through a scholarship, having trained as a classical dancer at Escola Espaço Clássico São Paulo and participated in dance shows.

Assis successfully auditioned for the front commission. She was studying medicine at PUC in Sorocaba. She rehearsed with commission members at night and attended college full-time.

== Personal life ==
Assis met her husband, photographer Denis Cordeiro, in 2009. In November 2016, they married.

Assis postponed plans to be a mother due to the COVID-19 pandemic and stated several times that the couple intends to adopt a child and have a biological child.

== Career ==
=== 2011-2019: Before Big Brother Brazil 20 ===
Thelminha graduated in Medicine in 2011 from the Pontifical Catholic University of São Paulo (PUC-SP) with a full scholarship from the University for All Program (PROUNI). In 2011, she worked for the Associação Saúde da Família as a general practitioner at the PSF and in 2012 as an on-duty physician at the Associação Paulista Para o Desenvolvimento da Medicina. She also worked at Hospital M'Boi Mirim, Hospital do Servidor Público Municipal de São Paulo and Hospital de Clínicas Municipal-São Bernardo.

Even before Big Brother, her life experience, the ease of communicating and the possibility of inspiring others encouraged Thelma to create a YouTube channel. On her channel, Thelminha addresses various topics such as racism, routine videos, tips on hair transition, LGBTQIA + cause, etc. Currently, Thelma's channel has over 300 thousand subscribers, and over 7 million views in all, with her already having earned the YouTube Silver Button.

=== 2020: Big Brother Brasil 20 ===
Thelma was one of the participants of the twentieth edition of the program aired by Rede Globo. Introducing a new dynamic, dividing the house into two groups called Pipoca and Camarote, composed of anonymous and famous members, respectively, the format was questioned by participants and the public about the possibility that anonymous members would not be able to compete equally with famous members. Thelma, in turn, was not put down by the fame of the members of Camarote, stating that only Beyoncé would scare her.

When questioned by the production of the program about who would enter the house, whether it was the doctor or the dancer from the samba school, Thelma said that it would be both, since it was not possible to disassociate them, since both were part of the same .

Adopting the observation strategy early in the game, Thelma stood out for her emotional intelligence. She was involved in some conflicts in the house, notable for the fact that she was the first to confront one of the participants who had not contributed to the purchase of food, harming several people.

Another relevant point during her participation in the program was the resistance test that consecrated her as a leader. Remaining standing for more than 26 hours, without going to the bathroom, eating or drinking water, Thelma won the race, becoming the leader of the week, having the right to a personalized party, whose chosen theme was Samba School, demonstrating once again the importance that this musical rhythm has in your life.

Overcoming four public votes and winning several competitions on the program, on 27 April 2020, she became champion with 44.1% of the public votes in a final with her best friends at home, Rafa Kalimann (34.81%). and Manu Gavassi (21.09%). . During the voting to choose who would be the show's champion, American actress Viola Davis retweeted on her social network Twitter a post by Brazilian actress Taís Araújo, in which she declared her support for Thelminha. In addition to Viola and Taís, Thelminha had, during the program, the support of other personalities such as Iza, Preta Gil, Giovanna Ewbank, Cleo, Bruno Gagliasso, Pabllo Vittar, Valesca Popozuda, Gleici Damasceno, among others.

After being announced as the reality champion, Thelma's commemorative photo on her Instagram broke Beyoncé's record and became until then the second photo to reach 1 million likes in less time, 18 minutes in all, behind only Selena Gomez.

Upon leaving the BBB as a winner, Thelma was faced with many opportunities that she did not even imagine were possible. In the first post-confinement moments, she received a video from Preta Gil informing her that she would be her new boss, since Denis Santos, Thelma's husband, had signed a contract with Mynd8, the singer's agency, which also works with well-being. . . . . well-known names in the market. such as Pabllo Vittar, Pepita, Cleo, Luísa Sonza, Ludmilla, Gleici Damasceno (the winner of BBB18), among others. With the end of confinement, Thelminha was hired by TV Globo, broadcaster of the program she won, to participate in É de Casa, interviewing medical friends who were working in the fight against COVID-19. Her participation pleased the program's management, which decided to hire her for a permanent team calledStay at Home with Dr. Thelma, with the aim of telling stories of overcoming difficulties during the pandemic that affected humanity in early 2020.

One of the first advertisements she made in her new life as a digital influencer was with the clothing chain C&A, which sponsored the Big Brother Brasil 20. After that, other partnerships were closed with brands from different segments such as Fenty Beauty, McDonald's, Spotify, Fisk, TIM, Rappi, Mercado Pago, Lacta, Ipanema, Natura, Colgate, Ford, among others. In addition, she became an ambassador for the brands L'Oréal Paris, Avon, Rico, Nielly and Always, gaining prominence in their respective advertisements.

After gaining experience as a presenter of her own segment on É de Casa, Thelminha began to exercise the new skill on other occasions, presenting Criança Esperança 2020 alongside Fábio Porchat, É de Casa himself in a special edition on racism, participating of various communication events and, finally, to present his own talk show on YouTube, Triangulando, which featured interviewees such as Djamila Ribeiro, Negra Li, Giovanna Ewbank, Bruno Gagliasso, Manu Gavassi and Padre Fábio de Melo, addressing the themes: inequality racial, Brazilian music, anxiety and time. Triangular was a ratings success and will have another season.

=== 2021-present: "Bem Estar" and other projects ===
In 2021, Thelma joined the team of presenters of the Bem Estar segment within the É de Casa program, remaining on Rede Globo's Saturday morning schedule. In June 2021, Thelma announced a new program in which she would be the presenter, Desafio Accepted, with tips for overcoming addictions and traumas, launched and shown by UOL. Launched on 5 July, the show had eight guest episodes each.

== Filmography ==
=== Television ===
Year	Title	Role
2020	Big Brother Brasil	Herself (Participant and Winner)
2020–present	É de Casa	Presenter
2020–present	Criança Esperança	Presenter
2021	Big Brother Brasil	Avon Ambassador

=== Internet ===
Year	Title	Role
2017–present	Thelminha	Herself
2020–present	Triangulando	Presenter
2021	Corrida das Blogueiras	Jury
2022	O Som do Rio	Herself

=== Books ===
Year	Title	Release	Publishing company
2021	Querer, poder, vencer	November 1, 2021	Editora Planeta
