= Adryana Ribeiro =

Brazilian singer (born 1973)

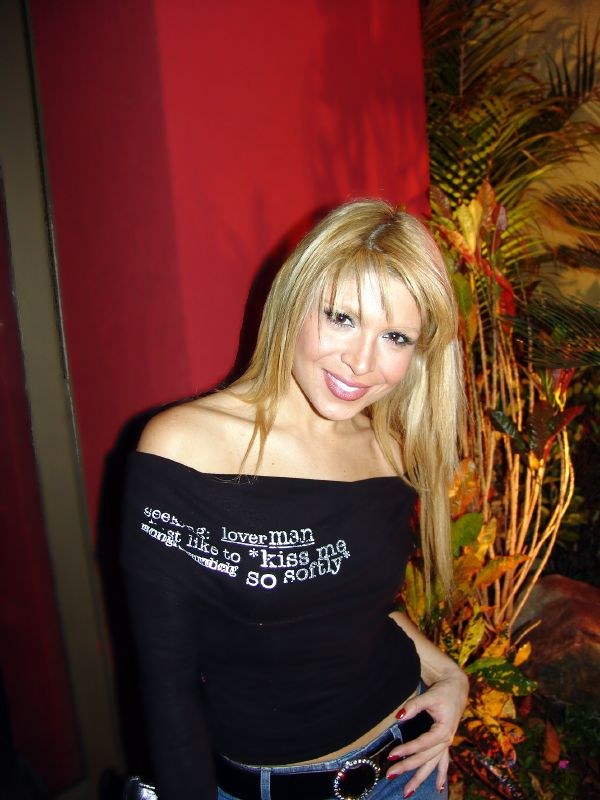
- Adryana Ribeiro in 2005

Background information
- Also known as: Adryana e a Rapaziada
- Born: 1973 (age 52–53)
- Label: Deckdisc

Adryana Ribeiro (born in 1973) is a Brazilian singer signed to Deckdisc. She has released solo works and also albums under the name "Adryana e a Rapaziada".

== Career ==
In 1994, after participating in a test for the record label Sony BMG Music Entertainment, music critic Sérgio Cabral said that Ribeiro was the "new revelation of samba". Her first album, Adryana Ribeiro, had the participation of artists and samba players like Martinho da Vila, Demônios da Garoa and Raphael Rabello. The graphic material was designed by Elifas Andreato. The song "Sempre Sou Eu", performed with Luiz Carlos, leader of the band Raça Negra, reached good positions in the music charts.

== Discography ==
=== Albums ===
- Adryana Ribeiro (1995)
- Em Busca do Sol (1997)
- Adryana e a Rapaziada (2001)
- Love Lindo (2003)
- Stop Baby (2004)
- Brilhante Raro (2005)

=== Singles ===
- "Pedra Falsa"
- "Estação São Paulo Part. Demônios da Garoa Trilha sonora da novela A proxima Vitima"
- "Faz Carinho que é Bom Part. Martinho da Vila"
- "Sempre Sou EU Part. Luis Carlos Raça NEgra"
- "Acreditar Part. Dona Ivone Lara"
- "E agora"
- "So faltava Você - Adryana e a Rapaziada"
- "Tudo Passa - Adryana e a Rapaziada "
- "Amor pra Valer - Adryana e a Rapaziada"
- "Que misturada - Adryana e a Rapaziada"
- "Garota de IPanema - Part. Jacques Moremlembaum"
- "Fim de Noite - Adryana e a Rapaziada"
- "Pout Pourri de Samba Rock - Adryana e a Rapaziada"
- "Eu te amo - Adryana e a Rapaziada"
- "Lembranças - Adryana e a Rapaziada"
- "Quando a Gente Briga - Adryana e a Rapaziada"
- "Este Seu Olhar - Tom Jobim- Abertura novela SBT Seus Olhos"
- "Saudade vem"
- "Como era antes"
- "Dois"
- "A Carta"
- "O FERA "
- "Ela não me quer - Part. Tche Garotos"
