= Nova Floresta =

Nova Floresta, Paraíba
- Municipality
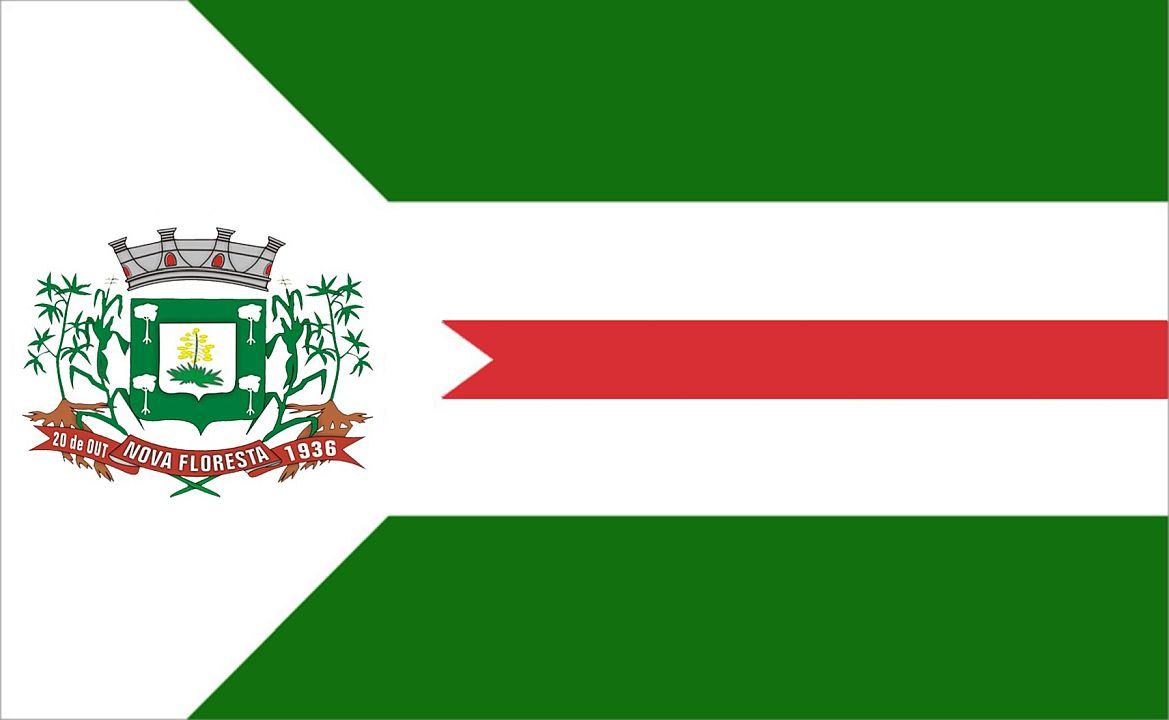
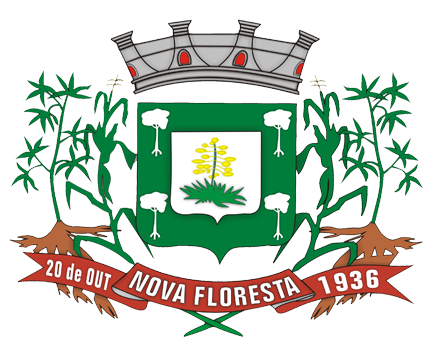
- Flag Coat of arms

- Location of Nova Floresta in Paraiba
- Coordinates: 6°27′18″S 36°12′10″W
- Country: Brazil
- Region: Northeast
- State: Paraíba
- Mesoregion: Agreste Paraibano

Area
  - Total: 23 sq mi (59 km^{2})
- Elevation: 2,188 ft (667 m)

Population (2020)
  - Total: 10,626
- Time zone: UTC−3 (BRT)

Nova Floresta (Central northeastern portuguese pronunciation: [ˈnɔvɐ flɔˈɾɛʃtɐ]) is a municipality in the state of Paraíba in the Northeast Region of Brazil known for its annual celebration of the stew.

== History ==
The municipality of Nova Floresta appeared around 1870. The first resident was Mr. Cecílio Ferreira de Araújo, father-in-law of three lords: Manuel Ramos Dantas, better known as Manuel Cazuza, Sandoval Sabino de Araújo and Luiz Sabino. Mr. Cecílio was the owner of the lands and the flour house belonging to the municipality of Cuité-PB. In 1927 mr. Benedito Marinho da Costa who established himself with a small trade classified the place as “new forest”, which gave rise to the toponym. From there, the small town took shape. As early as 1930, mr. Benedito Marinho transferred part of his business to Felinto Florentino de Azevedo, who acquired many lands in the region. In 1936, Felinto Florentino de Azevedo (23 August 1881 – 1962), who arrived in 1934, donated the land for the construction of the Chapel of São Severino Bispo and built countless residences, facilitating the conditions of growth. After two years, the first free fair of the village was held, which is still happening today with great movement, it was on a Sunday in the year 1938. As time went by, the village grew and gained cultural spaces, such as the Nova Floresta Clube, the oldest public building in the city, in 1951. In the following year, the Amplificadora Muirapiranga was inaugurated by the young Menézio Dantas. As a result of the urban, population and cultural growth of the then village of Nova Floresta, on March 29, 1955 the category of district belonging to Cuité was elevated. By 1959, Nova Floresta already had a club, a public school, a broadcaster service, the civil registry office and the economy revolved around small trade and subsistence agriculture and the culture of sisal, highlighting the work of the Irineu family, mainly Sebastião Clementino de Lima (Seu Nozinho), the largest agave and agribusiness producer in the region.The city was the largest fiber producer in Brazil.

== See also ==
- List of municipalities in Paraíba
