= Lidi Lisboa =

Brazilian actress (born 1984)

- Born: Lidiane Rafaela Lisboa; 13 August 1984 (age 42); Guaíra, Paraná, Brazil
- Other names: Rafaela Lisboa; Liddi Rafaela
- Occupations: Actress and Television presenter

Lidiane Rafaela Lisboa (13 August 1984 in Guaíra, Paraná) is a Brazilian actress and television presenter.

== Early life ==
Lisboa was raised by her great-grandparents, on a farm in the small town of Guaíra, in the interior of Paraná. Her mother became pregnant when she was only thirteen years old, and was forced to leave Lisboa at age four to find work in São Paulo. She also never met her father. She revealed that in her childhood she liked to swim in rivers, climb trees and play with pigs and chickens.

Her life began to change at age 8, when her mother picked her up to live with her in São Paulo. At 12, Lisboa began studying theater at school, deciding on the profession of actress. She had her first chance in the profession at 15, when was cast in the soap opera Um Anjo Caiu do Céu, but revealed that she could not do the soap opera because the childhood and adolescence court considered the role inappropriate for her age.

Discreet about her sentimental life, at the age of 15 she had her first boyfriend, named Samuel. They were together for eight years, and after the breakup they remained friends. Lidi Lisboa revealed to the press that he helped her overcome her childhood difficulties and taught her to love others, revealing that they spent a year dating at a distance, when he stayed in São Paulo and she was making her first soap opera in Rio de Janeiro, and that both were always very mature and knew how to deal with distance.

== Career ==
=== 2001-2014: Career Start ===
The actress debuted on television in 2001 on TV Globo, playing the slave Brásia in A Padroeira. With the end of the soap opera, his contract with Globo was not renewed. She lived alone in Rio de Janeiro and had no way to support herself - the financial help of her mother, the plastic artist Lídia Lisboa, was insufficient to keep her in the city, until another job came along. With no other alternative, she returned to live with her mother in São Paulo. When she turned eighteen, she got a job as a bartender at a nightclub in São Paulo. From then on, due to fights with her mother, she left home and began to live alone in São Paulo. To supplement her income, she also worked as a waitress, nanny and cleaning lady.

Between 2004 and 2005, she was in the main cast of the series Malhação in the role of the young fighter Aline. In 2006, she made a cameo in the children's series Sítio do Picapau Amarelo as Jurema. In 2007, she joins the cast of the soap opera Paraíso Tropical in the role of Tatiana, a humble young woman, girlfriend of a troubled bad boy.

Between 2007 and 2009, she recorded appearances in series and series on the network: Faça Sua História and Casos e Acasos. In 2009, she participates in the 18h soap opera, as the beautiful maid Das Dores. In 2011, she participates in the soap opera Insensato Coração as the prisoner Cátia. In 2012, she acts in Cheias de Charme, as the fun nanny Gracinha. In 2014, she stars in Império as the struggling Kelly.

=== 2016-2019: Jezabel ===
In 2016, she began a new phase of her career when she signed with RecordTV. She was part of the main cast of the period soap opera Escrava Mãe, in which she appears as Esméria, a long-suffering and ambitious slave. As the main villain of the serial, the actress was highly praised by both viewers and critics. In 2017, she acts in the medieval soap opera Belaventura playing the sweet and cultured Tamar, a young lady of society, who falls in love with her teacher. In 2018, she returned to TV Globo and a role in the soap opera Segundo Sol, as the police officer Suely. In 2019, she was cast in the miniseries Se Eu Fechar os Olhos Agora playing Maria Rosa, a young blessed woman, who suffers from racism on the part of the priest of her church. In 2019, she returned to RecordTV, and so landed the most visible role of her career when she was chosen to star in the macro-series Jezabel, where she plays the cruel and merciless Phoenician Jezebel. She also gained visibility for being the first black actress to be the protagonist of a biblical plot.

=== 2020-present: A Fazenda 12, new projects and Netflix ===
On September 8, 2020, she was confirmed as one of the twenty participants of the twelfth season of the reality show A Fazenda da RecordTV, being the fifteenth eliminated from the competition in a field against Biel and Jojo Todynho with 16.51% of the votes to stay, placing 6th in the competition. Lidi stayed at the house for 100 days, leaving only in the last week of the program. With the participation in the reality, Lidi won many fans, leaving as one of the big names of the season. Soon, she was hired by the mynd8 company to manage the career. On May 5, 2021, Rede Record announced the name Lidi Lisboa to present the online contents of the reality show Power Couple Brasil. Interviews with the eliminated couples, among other content aimed at the digital environment. On September 1, 2021, Netflix announced A Sogra Que Te Pariu, a sitcom series scheduled to premiere in 2022, where Lidi will play Alice, one of the protagonists of the plot. Due to its good performance and public acceptance, on September 3, 2021, it was announced that Lidi Lisboa would also present the digital content of the reality show A Fazenda, along with Lucas Selfie, a former confinement colleague. She will interview participants who leave the competition each week.

== Personal life ==
The actress, despite having been seen by the media over the years in the company of some actors, until then had not assumed any serious relationship, when in 2013 she reported that she was dating the actor from Rio Grande do Sul, Fábio Rhoden. From 2015 to 2020, the couple lived together in her apartment in Recreio dos Bandeirantes, a neighborhood in the Southwest Zone of Rio de Janeiro. However, after her participation in A Fazenda 12, the couple broke up - currently, Lidi remains single.

In November 2025, she changed her stage name to Liddi Rafaela due to the advice of a numerologist. In April 2026, she announced the return to the former stage name Lidi Lisboa because she was never being recognized as Liddi Rafaela.

== Filmography ==
=== Television ===
Television
Year	Title	Role	Notes
2001	A Padroeira	Brásia	
2004	Malhação	Aline Coimbra	(2004-2005)
2006	Sítio do Picapau Amarelo	Jurema	Cameo
2007	Paraíso Tropical	Tatiana	
2007	Faça Sua História	Maria Eleuza	Episode: "Pilot"
2008	Faça Sua História	Francineide	Episode: "Robauto S.A."
2008	Casos e Acasos	Cléo	Episode: "A Prova, a Namorada e a Isca"
2009	Paraíso	Das Dores	
2011	Insensato Coração	Cátia	Cameo
2012	Cheias de Charme	Gracinha	
2016	Escrava Mãe	Esméria / Malica Darrila	
2019	Jezabel	Jezabel	Protagonist
2020	A Fazenda 12	Participant	6th place
2021	Gênesis	Maalate	-
2022	A Sogra que te Pariu	Alice	Original Netflix

=== Internet ===
Television
Year	Title	Role	Notes
2021-presenter	Power Couple Live	Presenter	
2021-presenter	A Fazenda Live	Presenter	

=== Film ===
Television
Year	Title	Role	Notes
2009	Bróder	Cilene	
2015	Ninguém Ama Ninguém... Por Mais de Dois Anos	Mariana	
2016	Apaixonados - O Filme	Riuston	
2017	DesAmante	Elisângela	
