= A Fazenda 12 =

- Season 12
- Hosted by: Marcos Mion
- No. of days: 103
- No. of contestants: 20
- Winner: Jojo Todynho
- Runner-up: Biel
- Companion show: A Fazenda Online
- No. of episodes: 101

Release
- Original network: RecordTV
- Original release: September 8 – December 17, 2020

Season chronology
- ← Previous; Season 11 Next → Season 13

A Fazenda 12 was the twelfth season of the Brazilian reality television series A Fazenda, which premiered on Tuesday, September 8, 2020, on RecordTV. It was hosted by Marcos Mion. who returned for his third and last season as the host.

On December 17, 2020, 23-year-old singer Jojo Todynho won the competition with 52.54% of the public vote over singer Biel (36.10%), digital influencer Stéfani Bays (11.36%) and digital influencer Lipe Ribeiro (4.87%).

== Overview ==
=== Development ===
Marcos Mion returned as the main host for his third season, while comedian Victor Sarro replaced Lucas Salles as the show's online host and correspondent.

This season, the contestants moved into the Farm on Sunday, September 6, 2020, two days before the season premiere. Fire challenge episodes moved from Friday to Monday, while nominations and farmer challenge episodes moved from Monday and Tuesday to Tuesday and Wednesday respectively. Eviction episodes remained on Thursday nights.

=== Impacts of COVID-19 ===
On August 22, 2020, twenty celebrities were placed in quarantine and tested for COVID-19 multiple times. Four additional celebrities were also quarantined alongside as stand-by contestants. Once inside the Farm the contestants would be tested weekly and have no contact with the production crew and any supplies delivered would be disinfected. The production crew and staff would also be tested and screened for symptoms, provided personal protective equipment, and work in socially distant pods.

== Contestants ==
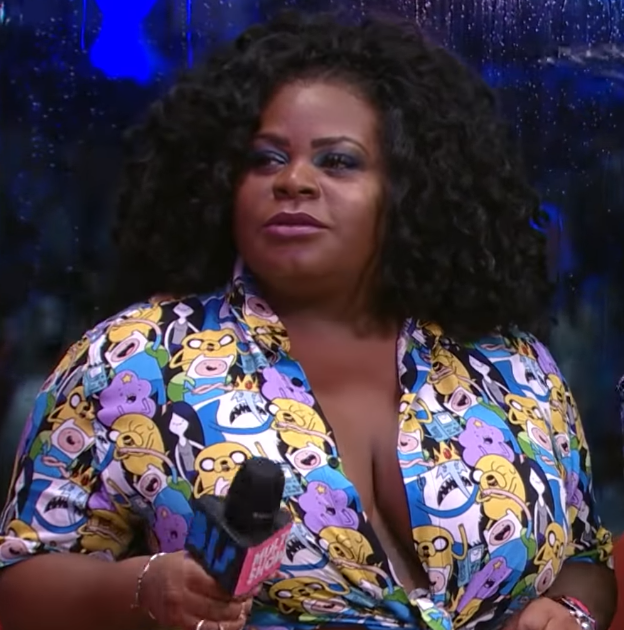
Jojo Todynho, winner of the twelfth season.

The first three celebrities were officially revealed by RecordTV on September 6–8, 2020, through the show's profile on TikTok. They were (in order): Jojo Todynho, Mariano and Victória Villarim. The season's full lineup of twenty celebrities was announced on the season premiere.

Below is the cast list of contestants for this season, with the occupations listed by the official show website and their respective ages at the start of filming.
(ages stated are at time of contest)

| Contestant | Age | Background | Hometown | Entered | Exited | Status | Finish |
|---|---|---|---|---|---|---|---|
| Fernandinho Beatbox | 45 | Musician | São Paulo | Day 1 | Day 12 | Eliminated 1st on September 17, 2020 | 20th |
| JP Gadêlha | 31 | Firefighter | Recife | Day 1 | Day 19 | Eliminated 2nd on September 24, 2020 | 19th |
| Rodrigo Moraes | 35 | TV host | Diadema | Day 1 | Day 26 | Eliminated 3rd on October 1, 2020 | 18th |
| Cartolouco | 25 | Journalist | São Paulo | Day 1 | Day 33 | Eliminated 4th on October 8, 2020 | 17th |
| Carol Narizinho | 30 | Digital influencer | Porto Alegre | Day 1 | Day 40 | Eliminated 5th on October 15, 2020 | 16th |
| Luiza Ambiel | 48 | Actress | Itatiba | Day 1 | Day 47 | Eliminated 6th on October 22, 2020 | 15th |
| Victória Villarim | 29 | Model & dancer | São Paulo | Day 1 | Day 54 | Eliminated 7th on October 29, 2020 | 14th |
| Juliano Ceglia | 42 | TV host | São Paulo | Day 1 | Day 61 | Eliminated 8th on November 5, 2020 | 13th |
| Lucas Maciel | 26 | TV host | São Paulo | Day 1 | Day 68 | Eliminated 9th on November 12, 2020 | 12th |
| Mirella | 22 | Singer | São Caetano do Sul | Day 1 | Day 75 | Eliminated 10th on November 19, 2020 | 11th |
| Raissa Barbosa | 29 | Model | Rio Branco | Day 1 | Day 82 | Eliminated 11th on November 26, 2020 | 10th |
| Jakelyne Oliveira | 27 | Model | Rondonópolis | Day 1 | Day 89 | Eliminated 12th on December 3, 2020 | 9th |
| Mariano | 33 | Singer | Campo Grande | Day 1 | Day 96 | Eliminated 13th on December 10, 2020 | 8th |
| Mateus Carrieri | 53 | Actor | São Paulo | Day 1 | Day 98 | Eliminated 14th on December 12, 2020 | 7th |
| Lidi Lisboa | 35 | Actress | Guaíra | Day 1 | Day 100 | Eliminated 15th on December 14, 2020 | 6th |
| Tays Reis | 25 | Singer | Ilhéus | Day 1 | Day 101 | Eliminated 16th on December 15, 2020 | 5th |
| Lipe Ribeiro | 28 | Digital influencer | Curitiba | Day 1 | Day 103 | Fourth place on December 17, 2020 | 4th |
| Stéfani Bays | 25 | Digital influencer | São Leopoldo | Day 1 | Day 103 | Third place on December 17, 2020 | 3rd |
| Biel | 24 | Singer | Lorena | Day 1 | Day 103 | Runner-up on December 17, 2020 | 2nd |
| Jojo Todynho | 23 | Singer | Rio de Janeiro | Day 1 | Day 103 | Winner on December 17, 2020 | 1st |

== Future Appearances ==
After this season, in 2021, MC Mirella appeared with her husband Dynho Alves in Power Couple Brasil 5, they finished in 12th place in the competition. In 2022, Mirella also appeared on De Férias com o Ex Caribe: Salseiro VIP as original cast member.

After this season, in 2021, Lucas Maciel appeared in Ilha Record 1, he finished in 13th place in the competition.

In 2022, Lucas Cartolouco appeared with his girlfriend Gabi Augusto in Power Couple Brasil 6, they finished in 9th place in the competition.

In 2022, Jojo Todynho appeared in Dança dos Famosos 19, she finished in 6th place in the competition.

In 2022, Lipe Ribeiro appeared on De Férias com o Ex Caribe: Salseiro VIP as original cast member.

== The game ==
For the first time since season 5, the contestants will be not divided in teams and the game will be played individually from Day 1.

=== Fire challenge ===
This season, three contestants (determined by a random draw) compete in the Fire challenge to win the Lamp power. The Lamp power entitles the holder the two flames (green and red) which may unleash good or bad consequences on the nomination process, with the red flame power defined by the public through the show's profile on TikTok among two options.

The winner chooses a flame for himself and delegates which contestant holds the other. The Flame holder's choice is marked in bold.

| Week | | Players | Winner | Sent to the Stall | Consequences |
|---|---|---|---|---|---|
| 1 | Day 1 | (none) | | Biel, Cartolouco, JP, Rodrigo (most votes from the House) | All contestants in the Stall are banned from compete in the first Farmer challenge. |
| 1 | Day 8 | JP | JP | **Luiza**, ~~**Victória**~~, Fernandinho, Mariano, Carol | Carol: The holder must exchange places with one of the contestants in the Stall → **Victória**.; JP: The holder must cancel the vote received from two contestants → **Biel** & **Rodrigo**. |
| 1 | Day 8 | Luiza | JP | **Luiza**, ~~**Victória**~~, Fernandinho, Mariano, Carol | Carol: The holder must exchange places with one of the contestants in the Stall → **Victória**.; JP: The holder must cancel the vote received from two contestants → **Biel** & **Rodrigo**. |
| 1 | Day 8 | Victória | JP | **Luiza**, ~~**Victória**~~, Fernandinho, Mariano, Carol | Carol: The holder must exchange places with one of the contestants in the Stall → **Victória**.; JP: The holder must cancel the vote received from two contestants → **Biel** & **Rodrigo**. |
| 2 | | Juliano | Juliano | **Lucas**, **Mateus**, Lidi, Raissa | Juliano: The holder must choose between win immunity or **win R$10.000**.; Biel: The holder must ban one nominee from compete in the Farmer challenge → **Luiza**. |
| 2 | | Lucas | Juliano | **Lucas**, **Mateus**, Lidi, Raissa | Juliano: The holder must choose between win immunity or **win R$10.000**.; Biel: The holder must ban one nominee from compete in the Farmer challenge → **Luiza**. |
| 2 | | Mateus | Juliano | **Lucas**, **Mateus**, Lidi, Raissa | Juliano: The holder must choose between win immunity or **win R$10.000**.; Biel: The holder must ban one nominee from compete in the Farmer challenge → **Luiza**. |
| 3 | | Lipe | Lipe | **Rodrigo**, **Victória**, Biel, Juliano | Lipe: The holder must exchange one nominee (except the Farmer's) by another contestant → **Cartolouco** by **Juliano**.; Lucas: The holder must ban two contestants from vote (**Lucas** & **Lipe**) and choose two to vote twice (**Cartolouco** & **Luiza**). |
| 3 | | Rodrigo | Lipe | **Rodrigo**, **Victória**, Biel, Juliano | Lipe: The holder must exchange one nominee (except the Farmer's) by another contestant → **Cartolouco** by **Juliano**.; Lucas: The holder must ban two contestants from vote (**Lucas** & **Lipe**) and choose two to vote twice (**Cartolouco** & **Luiza**). |
| 3 | | Victória | Lipe | **Rodrigo**, **Victória**, Biel, Juliano | Lipe: The holder must exchange one nominee (except the Farmer's) by another contestant → **Cartolouco** by **Juliano**.; Lucas: The holder must ban two contestants from vote (**Lucas** & **Lipe**) and choose two to vote twice (**Cartolouco** & **Luiza**). |
| 4 | | Lucas | Lucas | **Mirella**, **Tays**, Lidi, Luiza | Cartolouco: The holder is banned from vote and every vote he receives will be counted as two.; Lucas: The holder must pass all the votes that any contestant received (**Biel**) to another contestant (**Cartolouco**). |
| 4 | | Mirella | Lucas | **Mirella**, **Tays**, Lidi, Luiza | Cartolouco: The holder is banned from vote and every vote he receives will be counted as two.; Lucas: The holder must pass all the votes that any contestant received (**Biel**) to another contestant (**Cartolouco**). |
| 4 | | Tays | Lucas | **Mirella**, **Tays**, Lidi, Luiza | Cartolouco: The holder is banned from vote and every vote he receives will be counted as two.; Lucas: The holder must pass all the votes that any contestant received (**Biel**) to another contestant (**Cartolouco**). |
| 5 | | Jojo | Lipe | ~~**Jojo**~~, ~~**Stéfani**~~, ~~Juliano~~, ~~Tays~~; Biel, Mariano, Mateus, Victória | Lucas: The holder must exchange all contestants in the Stall by four in the House → **Biel**, **Mariano**, **Mateus**, **Victória**.; Lipe: The holder and another contestant chosen by him are immune to the House vote → **Lucas**. |
| 5 | | Lipe | Lipe | ~~**Jojo**~~, ~~**Stéfani**~~, ~~Juliano~~, ~~Tays~~; Biel, Mariano, Mateus, Victória | Lucas: The holder must exchange all contestants in the Stall by four in the House → **Biel**, **Mariano**, **Mateus**, **Victória**.; Lipe: The holder and another contestant chosen by him are immune to the House vote → **Lucas**. |
| 5 | | Stéfani | Lipe | ~~**Jojo**~~, ~~**Stéfani**~~, ~~Juliano~~, ~~Tays~~; Biel, Mariano, Mateus, Victória | Lucas: The holder must exchange all contestants in the Stall by four in the House → **Biel**, **Mariano**, **Mateus**, **Victória**.; Lipe: The holder and another contestant chosen by him are immune to the House vote → **Lucas**. |
| 6 | | Lucas | Raissa | **Lucas**, **Mateus**, Juliano, Biel | Raissa: The holder's vote will be counted as two. She must also cancel two votes received by any contestants → **Jakelyne**.; Jojo: The holder must choose three contestants (**Biel**, **Juliano**, **Lidi**); a new vote decides which one is the fourth nominee. |
| 6 | | Mateus | Raissa | **Lucas**, **Mateus**, Juliano, Biel | Raissa: The holder's vote will be counted as two. She must also cancel two votes received by any contestants → **Jakelyne**.; Jojo: The holder must choose three contestants (**Biel**, **Juliano**, **Lidi**); a new vote decides which one is the fourth nominee. |
| 6 | | Raissa | Raissa | **Lucas**, **Mateus**, Juliano, Biel | Raissa: The holder's vote will be counted as two. She must also cancel two votes received by any contestants → **Jakelyne**.; Jojo: The holder must choose three contestants (**Biel**, **Juliano**, **Lidi**); a new vote decides which one is the fourth nominee. |
| 7 | | Biel | Biel | **Jakelyne**, **Lipe**, **Mirella**, Raissa | Biel: The Farmer wins R$20.000 if he transfer his nomination power to the holder → **offer accepted** (**Lipe**).; Victória: The holder must exchange the fourth nominee (Tays) for any other contestant, except the Farmer → ~~**Raissa**~~.^{18} |
| 7 | | Jakelyne | Biel | **Jakelyne**, **Lipe**, **Mirella**, Raissa | Biel: The Farmer wins R$20.000 if he transfer his nomination power to the holder → **offer accepted** (**Lipe**).; Victória: The holder must exchange the fourth nominee (Tays) for any other contestant, except the Farmer → ~~**Raissa**~~.^{18} |
| 7 | | Lipe | Biel | **Jakelyne**, **Lipe**, **Mirella**, Raissa | Biel: The Farmer wins R$20.000 if he transfer his nomination power to the holder → **offer accepted** (**Lipe**).; Victória: The holder must exchange the fourth nominee (Tays) for any other contestant, except the Farmer → ~~**Raissa**~~.^{18} |
| 7 | | Mirella | Biel | **Jakelyne**, **Lipe**, **Mirella**, Raissa | Biel: The Farmer wins R$20.000 if he transfer his nomination power to the holder → **offer accepted** (**Lipe**).; Victória: The holder must exchange the fourth nominee (Tays) for any other contestant, except the Farmer → ~~**Raissa**~~.^{18} |
| 8 | | Jojo | Lucas | **Jojo**, **Lidi**, Stéfani, Mateus | Lipe: The holder and another contestant chosen by him are immune to become the fourth nominee → **Lidi**.; Lucas: The holder is immune this week and had to choose any contestant to be the third nominee → **Mateus**. |
| 8 | | Lidi | Lucas | **Jojo**, **Lidi**, Stéfani, Mateus | Lipe: The holder and another contestant chosen by him are immune to become the fourth nominee → **Lidi**.; Lucas: The holder is immune this week and had to choose any contestant to be the third nominee → **Mateus**. |
| 8 | | Lucas | Lucas | **Jojo**, **Lidi**, Stéfani, Mateus | Lipe: The holder and another contestant chosen by him are immune to become the fourth nominee → **Lidi**.; Lucas: The holder is immune this week and had to choose any contestant to be the third nominee → **Mateus**. |
| 9 | | Lipe | Mirella | **Lipe**, **Stéfani**, Lucas, Mariano | Mirella: The holder wins R$20.000 if she punishes the House with 48 hours without running water → **offer accepted**.; Lucas: The holder must choose a contestant to win R$10.000 (**Lidi**) and another to be the fourth nominee (**Jakelyne**). |
| 9 | | Mirella | Mirella | **Lipe**, **Stéfani**, Lucas, Mariano | Mirella: The holder wins R$20.000 if she punishes the House with 48 hours without running water → **offer accepted**.; Lucas: The holder must choose a contestant to win R$10.000 (**Lidi**) and another to be the fourth nominee (**Jakelyne**). |
| 9 | | Stéfani | Mirella | **Lipe**, **Stéfani**, Lucas, Mariano | Mirella: The holder wins R$20.000 if she punishes the House with 48 hours without running water → **offer accepted**.; Lucas: The holder must choose a contestant to win R$10.000 (**Lidi**) and another to be the fourth nominee (**Jakelyne**). |
| 10 | | Lidi | Mariano | **Lidi**, **Raissa**, Stéfani, Biel | Mariano: The holder must save a nominee, except the Farmer's (**Tays**), and ban another from compete for Farmer (**Mirella**).; Lipe: The holder must choose a contestant from the House to be the fourth nominee → **Tays**. |
| 10 | | Mariano | Mariano | **Lidi**, **Raissa**, Stéfani, Biel | Mariano: The holder must save a nominee, except the Farmer's (**Tays**), and ban another from compete for Farmer (**Mirella**).; Lipe: The holder must choose a contestant from the House to be the fourth nominee → **Tays**. |
| 10 | | Raissa | Mariano | **Lidi**, **Raissa**, Stéfani, Biel | Mariano: The holder must save a nominee, except the Farmer's (**Tays**), and ban another from compete for Farmer (**Mirella**).; Lipe: The holder must choose a contestant from the House to be the fourth nominee → **Tays**. |
| 11 | | Jakelyne | Lipe | **Jakelyne**, **Tays**, Mateus, Raissa | Lidi: The holder must swap the nominee banned from the Farmer's challenge for another nominee → **Lidi** for **Mariano**.; Lipe: The holder must start the "save chain" in order to determine this week's fourth nominee. |
| 11 | | Lipe | Lipe | **Jakelyne**, **Tays**, Mateus, Raissa | Lidi: The holder must swap the nominee banned from the Farmer's challenge for another nominee → **Lidi** for **Mariano**.; Lipe: The holder must start the "save chain" in order to determine this week's fourth nominee. |
| 11 | | Tays | Lipe | **Jakelyne**, **Tays**, Mateus, Raissa | Lidi: The holder must swap the nominee banned from the Farmer's challenge for another nominee → **Lidi** for **Mariano**.; Lipe: The holder must start the "save chain" in order to determine this week's fourth nominee. |
| 12 | | Jojo | Mariano | **Jojo**, **Stéfani**, Biel, Lipe | Mariano: The holder must choose between **win immunity and a 48-hour House water punishment** or win R$20.000.; Lidi: The holder is this week's fourth nominee. If she is already nominated, she must choose the replacement → **Jojo**. |
| 12 | | Mariano | Mariano | **Jojo**, **Stéfani**, Biel, Lipe | Mariano: The holder must choose between **win immunity and a 48-hour House water punishment** or win R$20.000.; Lidi: The holder is this week's fourth nominee. If she is already nominated, she must choose the replacement → **Jojo**. |
| 12 | | Stéfani | Mariano | **Jojo**, **Stéfani**, Biel, Lipe | Mariano: The holder must choose between **win immunity and a 48-hour House water punishment** or win R$20.000.; Lidi: The holder is this week's fourth nominee. If she is already nominated, she must choose the replacement → **Jojo**. |
| 13 | | Biel | Biel | **Lipe**, **Tays**, Stéfani | Biel: The holder must choose between win R$20.000 or **exchange one nominee** (except the Farmer's) → **Mateus** by **Jojo**.; Mateus: The holder must choose two contestants (**Biel**, **Stéfani**); a new vote decides which one is the fourth nominee. |
| 13 | | Lipe | Biel | **Lipe**, **Tays**, Stéfani | Biel: The holder must choose between win R$20.000 or **exchange one nominee** (except the Farmer's) → **Mateus** by **Jojo**.; Mateus: The holder must choose two contestants (**Biel**, **Stéfani**); a new vote decides which one is the fourth nominee. |
| 13 | | Tays | Biel | **Lipe**, **Tays**, Stéfani | Biel: The holder must choose between win R$20.000 or **exchange one nominee** (except the Farmer's) → **Mateus** by **Jojo**.; Mateus: The holder must choose two contestants (**Biel**, **Stéfani**); a new vote decides which one is the fourth nominee. |

=== AliExpress power ===
On Day 63, all remaining contestants took part in a special challenge sponsored by AliExpress in order to win extra prizes. However, among the prizes was a special secret power which would unleash consequences at this week's nominations. Biel ended up winning the power. During the live nominations on Day 66, it was revealed that the power consisted of exchanging either the second or third nominee for any contestant of his choice.

=== Obligations ===
| | Week 1 | Week 2 | Week 3 | Week 4 | Week 5 | Week 6 | Week 7 | Week 8 | Week 9 | Week 10 | Week 11 | Week 12 | Week 13 | Week 14 |
|---|---|---|---|---|---|---|---|---|---|---|---|---|---|---|
| Farmer of the week | **Jakelyne** | **Rodrigo** | **Carol** | **Juliano** | **Luiza** | **Mariano** | **Juliano** | **Jakelyne** | **Biel** | **Jakelyne** | **Jojo** | **Mateus** | **Lidi** | **Stéfani** |
| Cows | Lucas; Luiza | Tays; Cartolouco | Mariano; Stéfani | Lidi; Raissa | Biel; Mateus | Jojo; Juliano | Jakelyne; Lipe | Mirella; Raissa | Stéfani; Mariano | Lidi; Tays | Biel; Mateus | Jakelyne | Biel | Lipe |
| Horses | Victória | Jojo | Luiza | Mirella | Carol | Tays | Stéfani | Lucas | Jakelyne | Raissa | Lipe | Mariano | Stéfani | Tays |
| Donkeys | Carol | Mateus | Lipe | Cartolouco | Victória | Lidi | Mirella | Stéfani | Lucas | Jojo | Mariano | Stéfani | Lipe | Lidi |
| Sheep | Fernandinho | Raissa | Lucas | Lipe | Jakelyne | Mirella | Mariano | Biel | Mateus | Stéfani | Tays | Lipe | Jojo | Stéfani |
| Goats | Mirella | Stéfani | Jakelyne | Tays | Mariano | Raissa | Victória | Jojo | Lipe | Mateus | Lidi | Tays | Mateus | Mateus |
| Garden Plants | Juliano | Biel | Mateus | Luiza | Stéfani | Lucas | Lidi | Mariano | Mirella | Lipe | Raissa | Lidi | Tays | Biel |
| Birds | Mariano | JP | Victória | Jojo | Lucas | Lipe | Mateus | Tays | Lidi | Biel | Stéfani | Biel | Mariano | Mateus |
| Trash | Lipe | Lidi | Juliano | Carol | Tays | Luiza | Biel | Mateus | Raissa | Mariano | Jakelyne | Jojo | Mateus | Jojo |

=== Voting history ===
| | Week 1 | Week 2 | Week 3 | Week 4 | Week 5 | Week 6 | Week 7 | Week 8 | Week 9 | Week 10 | Week 11 | Week 12 | Week 13 | Week 14 | | | |
| | Week 1 | Week 2 | Week 3 | Week 4 | Week 5 | Week 6 | Week 7 | Week 8 | Week 9 | Week 10 | Week 11 | Week 12 | Week 13 | Day 97 | Day 99 | | Finale |
|---|---|---|---|---|---|---|---|---|---|---|---|---|---|---|---|---|---|
| Farmer of the week | Jakelyne | Rodrigo | Carol | Juliano | Luiza | Mariano | Juliano | Jakelyne | Biel | Jakelyne | Jojo | Mateus | Lidi | Stéfani | (none) | | |
| Farmer of the week | Jakelyne | Rodrigo | Carol | Juliano | Luiza | Mariano | Biel | Jakelyne | Biel | Jakelyne | Jojo | Mateus | Lidi | Stéfani | (none) | | |
| Nomination (Farmer) | Cartolouco | Carol | Rodrigo | Jojo | Tays | Luiza | Lipe | Juliano | Jojo | Mirella | Lidi | Jakelyne | Mariano | Mateus | (none) | | |
| Nomination (House) | Raissa | Luiza | Raissa | ~~Biel~~; Cartolouco | Carol | Mirella | Victória | Biel | ~~Mateus~~; Raissa | Mateus | Mariano | Biel | ~~Mateus~~; Jojo | Jojo | (none) | | |
| Nomination (Stall) | Fernandinho | Lidi | Biel | Luiza | Biel | Mateus | Jakelyne | (none) | Lucas | Stéfani | Raissa | Lidi | Lipe | Lidi | (none) | | |
| Nomination (Twist) | Rodrigo | JP | ~~Cartolouco~~; Juliano | Biel | Mariano | Juliano | Tays; ~~Raissa~~ | Mateus; Tays | Jakelyne | ~~Tays~~; Jojo | Mateus | Jojo | Stéfani | (none) | Biel; Jojo; Lidi | Lipe; Tays; Stéfani | (none) |
| Jojo | Lidi | Juliano | Cartolouco | ~~Biel~~; Cartolouco | Juliano | Mirella | Mariano | Biel | Jakelyne | Tays | Mariano | Biel | Biel | Biel | Nominee | Not eligible | **Winner** (Day 103) |
| Jojo | Lidi | Juliano | Cartolouco | ~~Biel~~; Cartolouco | Juliano | Juliano | Mariano | Biel | Jakelyne | Tays | Mariano | Biel | Biel | Biel | Nominee | Not eligible | **Winner** (Day 103) |
| Biel | Raissa | Luiza | Raissa | Stéfani | Carol | Jakelyne | Lidi | Raissa | Farmer of the week | Jojo | Stéfani | Jojo | Lipe | Jojo | Jojo; Lidi | Not eligible | **Runner-up** (Day 103) |
| Biel | Raissa | Luiza | Raissa | Stéfani | Carol | Lidi | Lidi | Raissa | Farmer of the week | Jojo | Stéfani | Jojo | Stéfani | Jojo | Jojo; Lidi | Not eligible | **Runner-up** (Day 103) |
| Stéfani | Biel | Biel | Tays | ~~Biel~~; Cartolouco | Juliano | Tays | Biel | Biel | ~~Mateus~~ | Mateus | Mariano | Biel | ~~Mateus~~ | Farmer of the week | Not eligible | Nominee | **Third place** (Day 103) |
| Stéfani | Biel | Biel | Tays | ~~Biel~~; Cartolouco | Juliano | Juliano | Biel | Biel | ~~Mateus~~ | Mateus | Mariano | Biel | Biel | Farmer of the week | Not eligible | Nominee | **Third place** (Day 103) |
| Lipe | Raissa | Luiza | Banned | ~~Biel~~; Cartolouco | Carol | Mirella | Victória | Biel | ~~Mateus~~ | Mateus | Biel | Biel | ~~Mateus~~ | Tays | Not eligible | Tays; Stéfani | **Fourth place** (Day 103) |
| Lipe | Raissa | Luiza | Banned | ~~Biel~~; Cartolouco | Carol | Juliano | Victória | Biel | ~~Mateus~~ | Mateus | Biel | Biel | Biel | Tays | Not eligible | Tays; Stéfani | **Fourth place** (Day 103) |
| Tays | Rodrigo | Luiza | Raissa | Stéfani | Mirella | Mirella | Stéfani | Mirella | Raissa | Jojo | Raissa | Lipe | Lipe | Lipe | Not eligible | Nominee | Evicted (Day 101) |
| Tays | Rodrigo | Luiza | Raissa | Stéfani | Mirella | Juliano | Stéfani | Mirella | Raissa | Jojo | Raissa | Lipe | Stéfani | Lipe | Not eligible | Nominee | Evicted (Day 101) |
| Lidi | Biel | Victória | Jojo | Mateus | Carol | Mirella | Victória | Biel | ~~Mateus~~ | Mateus | Mariano | Jojo | Farmer of the week | Jojo | Nominee | Evicted (Day 100) | |
| Lidi | Biel | Victória | Jojo | Mateus | Carol | Juliano | Victória | Biel | ~~Mateus~~ | Mateus | Mariano | Jojo | Farmer of the week | Jojo | Nominee | Evicted (Day 100) | |
| Mateus | Raissa | JP | Lidi | ~~Biel~~; Cartolouco | Raissa | Lidi | Victória | Mirella | Raissa | Lipe | Raissa | Farmer of the week | Stéfani | Lidi | Evicted (Day 98) | | |
| Mateus | Raissa | JP | Lidi | ~~Biel~~; Cartolouco | Raissa | Lidi | Victória | Mirella | Raissa | Lipe | Raissa | Farmer of the week | Stéfani | Lidi | Evicted (Day 98) | | |
| Mariano | Rodrigo | Mirella | Luiza | Cartolouco (x2) | Mirella | Farmer of the week | Victória | Mirella | Mirella | Jojo | Stéfani | Stéfani | ~~Mateus~~ | Evicted (Day 96) | | | |
| Mariano | Rodrigo | Mirella | Luiza | Cartolouco (x2) | Mirella | Farmer of the week | Victória | Mirella | Mirella | Jojo | Stéfani | Stéfani | Stéfani | Evicted (Day 96) | | | |
| Jakelyne | Farmer of the week | JP | Raissa | ~~Biel~~; Cartolouco | Juliano | Mirella | Victória | Farmer of the week | ~~Mateus~~ | Farmer of the week | Raissa | Biel | Evicted (Day 89) | | | | |
| Jakelyne | Farmer of the week | JP | Raissa | ~~Biel~~; Cartolouco | Juliano | Juliano | Victória | Farmer of the week | ~~Mateus~~ | Farmer of the week | Raissa | Biel | Evicted (Day 89) | | | | |
| Raissa | Biel | Lipe | Tays | Cartolouco (x2) | Juliano | Victória (x2) | Victória | Biel | ~~Mateus~~ | Tays | Mateus | Evicted (Day 82) | | | | | |
| Raissa | Biel | Lipe | Tays | Cartolouco (x2) | Juliano | Juliano | Victória | Biel | ~~Mateus~~ | Tays | Mateus | Evicted (Day 82) | | | | | |
| Mirella | Jojo | Mariano | Tays | Mariano | Lidi | Jakelyne | Lidi | Mariano | Tays | Mateus | Evicted (Day 75) | | | | | | |
| Mirella | Jojo | Mariano | Tays | Mariano | Lidi | Lidi | Lidi | Mariano | Tays | Mateus | Evicted (Day 75) | | | | | | |
| Lucas | Biel | Luiza | Banned | Cartolouco (x2) | Carol | Lipe | Mateus | Biel | Jakelyne | Evicted (Day 68) | | | | | | | |
| Lucas | Biel | Luiza | Banned | Cartolouco (x2) | Carol | Juliano | Mateus | Biel | Jakelyne | Evicted (Day 68) | | | | | | | |
| Juliano | Raissa | Luiza | Raissa | ~~Biel~~ | Carol | Jakelyne | Farmer of the week | Biel | Evicted (Day 61) | | | | | | | | |
| Juliano | Raissa | Luiza | Raissa | ~~Biel~~ | Carol | Lidi | Farmer of the week | Biel | Evicted (Day 61) | | | | | | | | |
| Victória | Lidi | Cartolouco | Lidi | Lipe | Jakelyne | Jakelyne | Lidi | Evicted (Day 54) | | | | | | | | | |
| Victória | Lidi | Cartolouco | Lidi | Lipe | Jakelyne | Lidi | Lidi | Evicted (Day 54) | | | | | | | | | |
| Luiza | Juliano | Biel | Tays; Tays | Mariano | Farmer of the week | Jakelyne | Evicted (Day 47) | | | | | | | | | | |
| Luiza | Juliano | Biel | Tays; Tays | Mariano | Farmer of the week | Lidi | Evicted (Day 47) | | | | | | | | | | |
| Carol | Lidi | Lipe | Farmer of the week | ~~Biel~~; Cartolouco | Lidi | Evicted (Day 40) | | | | | | | | | | | |
| Cartolouco | Raissa | Luiza | Raissa; Raissa | Banned | Evicted (Day 33) | | | | | | | | | | | | |
| Rodrigo | Raissa | Farmer of the week | Mateus | Evicted (Day 26) | | | | | | | | | | | | | |
| JP | Raissa | Jakelyne | Evicted (Day 19) | | | | | | | | | | | | | | |
| Fernandinho | Raissa | Evicted (Day 12) | | | | | | | | | | | | | | | |
| Notes | 1, 2 | 3, 4 | 5, 6, 7, 8 | 9, 10, 11 | 12, 13 | 14, 15 | 16, 17; 18, 19 | 20, 21 | 22, 23 | 24, 25 | 26, 27 | 28, 29, 30 | 31, 32, 33; 34, 35 | 36 | 37 | | 38 |
| Up for nomination | Cartolouco; Raissa; Fernandinho; Rodrigo | Carol; Luiza; Lidi; JP | Rodrigo; Raissa; Biel; Juliano | Jojo; Cartolouco; Luiza; Biel | Tays; Carol; Biel; Mariano | Luiza; Mirella; Mateus; Juliano | Lipe; Victória; Jakelyne; Tays | Juliano; Biel; Mateus; Tays | Jojo; Raissa; Lucas; Jakelyne | Mirella; Mateus; Stéfani; Jojo | Lidi; Mariano; Raissa; Mateus | Jakelyne; Biel; Lidi; Jojo | Mariano; Jojo; Lipe; Stéfani | (none) | | | |
| Farmer winner | Rodrigo | Carol | Juliano | Luiza | Mariano | Juliano | ~~Jakelyne~~; Jakelyne | Biel | Jakelyne | Jojo | Mateus | Lidi | ~~Jojo~~; Stéfani | (none) | | | |
| Nominated for eviction | Cartolouco; Fernandinho; Raissa | JP; Lidi; Luiza | Biel; Raissa; Rodrigo | Biel; Cartolouco; Jojo | Biel; Carol; Tays | Luiza; Mateus; Mirella | Lipe; Tays; Victória | Juliano; Mateus; Tays | Jojo; Lucas; Raissa | Mateus; Mirella; Stéfani | Lidi; Mariano; Raissa | Biel; Jakelyne; Jojo | Jojo; Lipe; Mariano | Jojo; Lidi; Mateus | Biel; Jojo; Lidi | Lipe; Stéfani; Tays | Biel; Jojo; Lipe; Stéfani |
| Evicted | **Fernandinho**; 22.45% to save | **JP**; 26.06% to save | **Rodrigo**; 25.63% to save | **Cartolouco**; 24.90% to save | **Carol**; 29.51% to save | **Luiza**; 11.01% to save | **Victória**; 19.24% to save | **Juliano**; 29.43% to save | **Lucas**; 26.45% to save | **Mirella**; 29.44% to save | **Raissa**; 25.58% to save | **Jakelyne**; 27.20% to save | **Mariano**; 24.91% to save | **Mateus**; 20.02% to save | **Lidi**; 16.51% to save | **Tays**; 29.29% to save | **Lipe**; 4.87% (out of 4) |
| Evicted | **Fernandinho**; 22.45% to save | **JP**; 26.06% to save | **Rodrigo**; 25.63% to save | **Cartolouco**; 24.90% to save | **Carol**; 29.51% to save | **Luiza**; 11.01% to save | **Victória**; 19.24% to save | **Juliano**; 29.43% to save | **Lucas**; 26.45% to save | **Mirella**; 29.44% to save | **Raissa**; 25.58% to save | **Jakelyne**; 27.20% to save | **Mariano**; 24.91% to save | **Mateus**; 20.02% to save | **Lidi**; 16.51% to save | **Tays**; 29.29% to save | **Stéfani**; 11.36% (out of 3) |
| Evicted | **Fernandinho**; 22.45% to save | **JP**; 26.06% to save | **Rodrigo**; 25.63% to save | **Cartolouco**; 24.90% to save | **Carol**; 29.51% to save | **Luiza**; 11.01% to save | **Victória**; 19.24% to save | **Juliano**; 29.43% to save | **Lucas**; 26.45% to save | **Mirella**; 29.44% to save | **Raissa**; 25.58% to save | **Jakelyne**; 27.20% to save | **Mariano**; 24.91% to save | **Mateus**; 20.02% to save | **Lidi**; 16.51% to save | **Tays**; 29.29% to save | **Biel**; 36.10% (out of 3) |
| Survived | **Cartolouco**; 33.41% to save | **Luiza**; 33.19% to save | **Biel**; 32.73% to save | **Biel**; 30.79% to save | **Biel**; 33.02% to save | **Mirella**; 18.62% to save | **Tays**; 29.76% to save | **Tays**; 31.25% to save | **Raissa**; 33.97% to save | **Stéfani**; 32.91% to save | **Lidi**; 32.62% to save | **Biel**; 33.52% to save | **Lipe**; 28.31% to save | **Lidi**; 27.52% to save | **Biel**; Most votes to save | **Lipe**; Most votes to save | **Jojo**; 52.54% to win |
| Survived | **Raissa**; 44.14% to save | **Lidi**; 40.75% to save | **Raissa**; 41.64% to save | **Jojo**; 44.31% to save | **Tays**; 37.47% to save | **Mateus**; 70.37% to save | **Lipe**; 51% to save | **Mateus**; 39.32% to save | **Jojo**; 39.58% to save | **Mateus**; 37.65% to save | **Mariano**; 41.80% to save | **Jojo**; 39.28% to save | **Jojo**; 46.78% to save | **Jojo**; 52.46% to save | **Jojo**; Most votes to save | **Stéfani**; Most votes to save | **Jojo**; 52.54% to win |

==== Notes ====
- **^Note 1**: On day 5, Victória won immunity for the first nominations through a special challenge.
- **^Note 2**: As the third nominee, Fernandinho was asked to save someone and so on until only one contestant left. He saved Lidi, who saved Mariano, who saved Lipe, who saved Lucas, who saved Stéfani, who saved Mirella, who saved Jojo, who saved Mateus, who saved Juliano, who saved Tays, who saved Biel, who saved JP, who saved Luiza, who saved Carol, leaving Rodrigo as the fourth nominee. Rodrigo was then asked to ban one of the other three nominees from compete in the Farmer challenge, thus going straight to the public vote. He chose Raissa.
- **^Note 3**: As the third nominee, Lidi was asked to save someone and so on until only one contestant left. She saved Lucas, who saved Lipe, who saved Mariano, who saved Tays, who saved Jakelyne, who saved Stéfani, who saved Raissa, who saved Mirella, who saved Victória, who saved Jojo, who saved Mateus, who saved Juliano, who saved Biel, who saved Cartolouco, leaving JP as the fourth nominee.
- **^Note 4**: Red flame power holder Biel was asked to ban one of the four nominees from compete in the Farmer challenge, thus going straight to the public vote. He chose Luiza.
- **^Note 5**: Red flame power holder Lucas was asked to ban two contestants from vote and another two to vote twice. He chose to ban himself and Lipe from vote and Cartolouco and Luiza to vote twice.
- **^Note 6**: As the third nominee, Biel was asked to save someone and so on until only one contestant left. He saved Juliano, who saved Mateus, who saved Jojo, who saved Victória, who saved Luiza, who saved Mirella, who saved Lucas, who saved Stéfani, who saved Jakelyne, who saved Tays, who saved Mariano, who saved Lipe, who saved Lidi, leaving Cartolouco as the fourth nominee.
- **^Note 7**: Green flame power holder Lipe was asked to save one nominee (except the farmer's nominee) and trade by another contestant. He chose to save Cartolouco and replaced him with Juliano.
- **^Note 8**: Fourth nominee Juliano was asked to ban one of the other three nominees from compete in the Farmer challenge, thus going straight to the public vote. He chose Raissa.
- **^Note 9**: Red flame power holder Cartolouco was banned from vote and every vote he received would be counted as two. As a result, his 3 nominations were doubled-up to 6.
- **^Note 10**: Biel and Cartolouco received the most nominations with 6 each. Juliano, as Farmer of the week, had the casting vote and chose Biel to be the second nominee. However, Green flame power holder Lucas chose to overrule the Farmer's tiebreaker vote and passed all Biel's votes to Cartolouco, increasing his nominations total to 12, thus making him the second nominee instead.
- **^Note 11**: As the third nominee, Luiza was asked to save someone and so on until only one contestant left. She saved Mateus, who saved Victória, who saved Carol, who saved Mirella, who saved Raissa, who saved Stéfani, who saved Lucas, who saved Lidi, who saved Lipe, who saved Mariano, who saved Jakelyne, who saved Tays, leaving Biel as the fourth nominee. Biel was then asked to ban one of the other three nominees from compete in the Farmer challenge, thus going straight to the public vote. He chose Jojo.
- **^Note 12**: Red flame power holder Lipe won immunity for the House vote and had to choose another contestant to also be immune. He chose Lucas.
- **^Note 13**: As the third nominee, Biel was asked to save someone and so on until only one contestant left. He saved Juliano, who saved Mateus, who saved Jojo, who saved Victória, who saved Mirella, who saved Raissa, who saved Stéfani, who saved Lucas, who saved Lidi, who saved Lipe, who saved Jakelyne, leaving Mariano as the fourth nominee. Mariano was then asked to ban one of the other three nominees from compete in the Farmer challenge, thus going straight to the public vote. He chose Biel.
- **^Note 14**: Jakelyne and Mirella received the most nominations with 5 each. However, Green flame power holder Raissa chose to cancel two votes received by Jakelyne, decreasing her nominations total to 3, thus making Mirella the second nominee automatically.
- **^Note 15**: Red flame power holder Jojo had to choose the three contestants who would be eligible to become the fourth nominee through a surprise House vote. She chose Biel, Juliano and Lidi. Juliano ended up being nominated by an 8–6–0 vote, over Lidi and Biel, respectively. He was then asked to ban one of the other three nominees from compete in the Farmer challenge, thus going straight to the public vote; He chose Luiza.
- **^Note 16**: Juliano, as Farmer of the week, agreed to transfer his automatic nomination power to the green flame holder Biel, in order to win a R$20.000 prize. Biel chose Lipe to be the first nominee.
- **^Note 17**: As the third nominee, Jakelyne was asked to save someone and so on until only one contestant left. She saved Mariano, who saved Mateus, who saved Jojo, who saved Lidi, who saved Lucas, who saved Raissa, who saved Stéfani, who saved Mirella, who saved Biel, leaving Tays as the fourth nominee. However, red flame power holder Victória had to trade Tays by another contestant. She chose Raissa, who was then asked to ban one of the other three nominees from compete in the Farmer challenge, thus going straight to the public vote. She chose Victória.
- **^Note 18**: On day 53, the red flame power was canceled after production, warned by viewers, review the footage from Biel revealing the power to Juliano and Victoria during the vote, which was against the rules. As result, Raissa was saved from eviction and was replaced by the original nominee Tays. As the fourth nominee, Tays also chose Victória to be banned from compete in the Farmer challenge.
- **^Note 19**: On day 54, due to a production count error during the Farmer challenge who wrongly gave Jakelyne the win, the public vote was suspended in the afternoon. On eviction night, the challenge was replayed, where Jakelyne won and reclaimed her position as Farmer, sending Lipe and Tays to the public vote alongside Victória. Although the nominations remained the same, the original public's vote was voided and a new live vote was opened during the show for one hour to decide who would be evicted at the end of the night. Following Victória's eviction, the results from the suspended public vote were also revealed. Victória would still to be evicted regardless with 27.01%, while Lipe (41.81%) and Tays (31.15%) would still be safe.
- **^Note 20**: Red flame power holder Lucas won immunity for this week's nominations and had to choose any contestant to be the third nominee. He chose Mateus.
- **^Note 21**: As the third nominee, Mateus was asked to save someone and so on until only one contestant left. Green flame power holder Lipe and Lidi were imunne from this round as result of his power. Mateus saved Jojo, who saved Stéfani, who saved Mirella, who saved Raissa, who saved Mariano, leaving Tays as the fourth nominee. Tays was then asked to ban one of the other three nominees from compete in the Farmer challenge, thus going straight to the public vote. She chose Juliano.
- **^Note 22**: Red flame power holder Lucas had to choose any contestant to be the fourth nominee. He chose Jakelyne, who was then asked to ban one of the other three nominees from compete in the Farmer challenge, thus going straight to the public vote. She chose Lucas.
- **^Note 23**: AliExpress special power holder Biel chose to overrule the House's vote and exchanged the second nominee Mateus for Raissa.
- **^Note 24**: Red flame power holder Lipe had to choose any contestant from the main House to be the fourth nominee. He chose Tays. In a twist, fourth nominee Tays was asked to save someone and so on until only one contestant left. She saved Biel, who saved Mariano, who saved Lipe, who saved Lidi, who saved Raissa, leaving Jojo as the fifth nominee.
- **^Note 25**: Green flame power holder Mariano had to save one nominee (except the farmer's nominee). He chose Tays. Mariano was then asked to ban one of the four nominees from compete in the Farmer challenge, thus going straight to the public vote. He chose Mirella.
- **^Note 26**: This week, only the contestants in the main House were eligible to vote in order to determined the second nominee. Mariano and Stéfani received the most nominations with 2 each. Jojo, as Farmer of the week, had the casting vote and chose Mariano to be the second nominee. In another twist, instead of Mariano choosing the third nominee among the contestants in the Stall, a separate vote was held between them, which ended up nominating Raissa by a 3–1–0–0 vote, over Mateus, Jakelyne and Tays.
- **^Note 27**: Red flame power holder Lipe was asked to save someone and so on until only one contestant left. He saved Stéfani, who saved Jakelyne, who saved Tays, who saved Biel, leaving Mateus as the fourth nominee. Mateus was then asked to ban one of the other three nominees from compete in the Farmer challenge, thus going straight to the public vote. He chose Lidi. However, as Green flame power holder, Lidi overruled his decision and chose to veto Mariano instead.
- **^Note 28**: Green flame power holder Mariano chose to win immunity for this week's nominations.
- **^Note 29**: This week, the second and third nominees were determined in reverse order. First, only the contestants in the Stall were eligible to be nominated by the House vote. Then, Biel, as the second nominee, had to choose the third nominee among the contestants in the main House. He chose Lidi.
- **^Note 30**: Before the vote, Lamp winner Mariano chose to give the Red flame power to Lidi, which would automatically turn her in the fourth nominee. However, as Lidi was already nominated, she had to choose the replacement nominee herself. She chose Jojo. Jojo was then asked to ban one of the three nominees from compete in the Farmer challenge, thus going straight to the public vote. She chose Biel.
- **^Note 31**: This week, all contestants were eligible to become the second or third nominees regardless of were they are living in the House or in the Stall. After the House vote, Mateus, as the second nominee, chose Lipe to be the third nominee.
- **^Note 32**: Red flame power holder Mateus had to choose the two contestants who would be eligible to become the fourth nominee through a surprise House vote. He chose Biel and Stéfani. Stéfani ended up being nominated by a 4–3 vote over Biel.
- **^Note 33**: Green flame holder Biel chose to overrule the House's vote and exchanged the second nominee Mateus for Jojo.
- **^Note 34**: As the fourth nominee, Stéfani was asked to ban one of the other three nominees from compete in the Farmer challenge, thus going straight to the public vote. She chose Mariano.
- **^Note 35**: On day 95, due to a production error during the Farmer challenge who wrongly gave Jojo the win, the opening of the public vote was delayed until the morning of day 96. The challenge was resumed after the show from the point where the error occurred between Jojo and Stéfani. This time, Stéfani came out as the last Farmer, sending Jojo and Lipe to the public vote alongside Mariano.
- **^Note 36**: On day 97, the second nominee had the power to name the third nominee. After the House vote, Jojo, as the second nominee, chose Lidi to be the third nominee for eviction.
- **^Note 37**: On day 99, the final six contestants were automatically nominated for eviction in order to determine the finalists. Lipe, as the final challenge winner had the power to choose first who would face the public vote with him. He chose Tays. Then, Biel as the challenge runner-up, chose Jojo to face the public vote with him. Lipe had the final pick and chose to nominate Stéfani, sending Lidi to be nominated alongside Biel and Jojo.
- **^Note 38**: For the final, the public votes for the contestant they want to win A Fazenda 12.

== Ratings and reception ==
=== Brazilian ratings ===
All numbers are in points and provided by Kantar Ibope Media.

| Week | First air date | Last air date | Timeslot (BRT) | Daily SP viewers (in points) | | | | | | | SP viewers (in points) | BR viewers (in points) | Ref. |
| Week | First air date | Last air date | Timeslot (BRT) | Mon | Tue | Wed | Thu | Fri | Sat | Sun | SP viewers (in points) | BR viewers (in points) | Ref. |
|---|---|---|---|---|---|---|---|---|---|---|---|---|---|
| 1 | September 8, 2020 | September 13, 2020 | Monday to Saturday; 10:30 p.m. Sunday; 11:15 p.m. | — | 13.6 | 13.6 | 12.1 | 10.9 | 9.8 | 10.2 | 12.3 | 9.6 | |
| 2 | September 14, 2020 | September 20, 2020 | Monday to Saturday; 10:30 p.m. Sunday; 11:15 p.m. | 11.2 | 13.5 | 13.4 | 13.0 | 6.2 | 9.7 | 10.8 | 11.8 | 9.4 | |
| 3 | September 21, 2020 | September 27, 2020 | Monday to Saturday; 10:30 p.m. Sunday; 11:15 p.m. | 10.0 | 13.0 | 12.7 | 12.0 | 11.9 | 9.8 | 11.3 | 11.8 | 9.4 | |
| 4 | September 28, 2020 | October 4, 2020 | Monday to Saturday; 10:30 p.m. Sunday; 11:15 p.m. | 13.6 | 13.7 | 14.2 | 14.1 | 11.6 | 9.6 | 11.3 | 13.1 | 10.6 | |
| 5 | October 5, 2020 | October 11, 2020 | Monday to Saturday; 10:30 p.m. Sunday; 11:15 p.m. | 11.3 | 14.4 | 14.9 | 15.1 | 12.5 | 10.7 | 10.7 | 13.5 | 10.8 | |
| 6 | October 12, 2020 | October 18, 2020 | Monday to Friday; 11:00 p.m. Saturday; 10:30 p.m. Sunday; 11:15 p.m. | 11.8 | 14.5 | 14.5 | 13.8 | 12.7 | 11.2 | 12.7 | 13.4 | 10.9 | |
| 7 | October 19, 2020 | October 25, 2020 | Monday to Friday; 11:00 p.m. Saturday; 10:30 p.m. Sunday; 11:15 p.m. | 13.2 | 14.5 | 15.5 | 16.7 | 13.4 | 10.9 | 12.3 | 14.4 | 11.8 | |
| 8 | October 26, 2020 | November 1, 2020 | Monday to Friday; 11:00 p.m. Saturday; 10:30 p.m. Sunday; 11:15 p.m. | 13.3 | 16.2 | 18.0 | 17.3 | 11.9 | 10.8 | 12.1 | 15.0 | 12.2 | |
| 9 | November 2, 2020 | November 8, 2020 | Monday to Friday; 11:00 p.m. Saturday; 10:30 p.m. Sunday; 11:15 p.m. | 13.1 | 14.8 | 14.8 | 14.8 | 12.7 | 8.7 | 11.2 | 13.3 | 10.7 | |
| 10 | November 9, 2020 | November 15, 2020 | Monday to Friday; 11:00 p.m. Saturday; 10:30 p.m. Sunday; 11:15 p.m. | 12.7 | 14.9 | 14.4 | 16.0 | 12.3 | 9.7 | 9.7 | 13.5 | 11.1 | |
| 11 | November 16, 2020 | November 22, 2020 | Monday to Saturday; 10:30 p.m. Sunday; 11:15 p.m. | 14.5 | 16.3 | 14.1 | 16.0 | 12.9 | 10.1 | 11.5 | 14.3 | 11.7 | |
| 12 | November 23, 2020 | November 29, 2020 | Monday to Saturday; 10:30 p.m. Sunday; 11:15 p.m. | 12.7 | 14.3 | 15.3 | 15.4 | 12.3 | 10.6 | 10.1 | 13.5 | 11.0 | |
| 13 | November 30, 2020 | December 6, 2020 | Monday to Saturday; 10:30 p.m. Sunday; 11:15 p.m. | 12.8 | 14.2 | 15.4 | 16.1 | 12.9 | 10.0 | 10.9 | 13.7 | 11.2 | |
| 14 | December 7, 2020 | December 13, 2020 | Monday to Saturday; 10:30 p.m. Sunday; 11:15 p.m. | 12.7 | 14.4 | 14.4 | 14.9 | 14.5 | 11.7 | 14.1 | 13.9 | 11.6 | |
| 15 | December 14, 2020 | December 17, 2020 | Monday to Saturday; 10:30 p.m. Sunday; 11:15 p.m. | 14.9 | 14.8 | 13.8 | 16.8 | — | — | — | 15.1 | 13.2 | |

- In 2020, each point represents 260.558 households in 15 market cities in Brazil (74.987 households in São Paulo).
