= UL =

UL or Ul may refer to:

== Arts and media ==
- UL (The Belgariad), David Eddings' character
- New Hampshire Union Leader, a newspaper
- Unwritten Law, a punk rock band

== Businesses and organizations ==
- Cambridge University Library or University Library, a library at numerous universities
- SriLankan Airlines (IATA code UL)
- UL (safety organization), an American worldwide safety consulting and certification company previously known as Underwriters Laboratories
- Unia Lewicy, a Polish political party
- Unilever (stock symbol), a multinational corporation
- Upplands Lokaltrafik, a Swedish transport company

== Universities ==
=== Canada ===
- Université Laval, Québec
- University of Lethbridge, Alberta

=== England ===
- University of Lincoln
- University of London
- University of Leicester

=== Elsewhere ===
- University of Leoben, Austria
- University of Liberia, Monrovia
- University of Limerick, Ireland
- University of Lima, Perú
- University of Linz, Austria
- University of Lisbon, Portugal
- University of Limpopo, South Africa
- University of Lomé, Togo
- University of Lorraine, France
- University of Ljubljana, Slovenia
- University of Louisiana at Lafayette, United States

== Science and technology ==
=== Computing and telecommunication ===
- Uplink, in telecommunication
- Upload, the transfer of electronic data
- Unordered list (<ul></ul>), an HTML element
- ul, a UNIX command for translating underscores to terminal specific codes for displaying underlined text

=== Other uses in science and technology ===
- 3271 Ul, an asteroid
- Microlitre or microliter (μL), a unit of volume, when the Greek letter μ is replaced by a u
- Tolerable Upper Intake Level, part of the Dietary Reference Intake system of the US National Academy of Sciences

== Other uses ==
- Ul (mythology), a lunar deity in Vanuatuan mythology
- Ul (Portugal), a civil parish in Portugal
- Uttaranchal now Uttarakhand, a state in northern India (former ISO 3166-2 code)
- Ultralight aviation
- Unlimited liability
- Ulster loyalism

== See also ==
- Ull (disambiguation)
- UOL (disambiguation) (including U of L)
