= UOL =

UOL or U of L may refer to:

== Businesses ==
- United Online, a subsidiary of B. Riley Financial
- Universo Online, a Brazilian online service provider

== Universities ==
- University of Lahore, Pakistan
- University of Liverpool, England
- University of Lucknow, India
- University of London, England
- University of Louisville, Kentucky, United States

== Other uses ==
- Unicorns of Love, a German esports team
- Pogogul Airport, Indonesia, IATA code UOL

== See also ==
- University of Leeds, England
- University of Leicester, England
- University of Lethbridge, Alberta, Canada
- University of Limerick, Ireland
- University of Lincoln, England
- UOL HOST, a website hosting and cloud computing firm owned by Universo Online
- Compasso UOL, an IT outsourcing company owned by Universo Online
