= Malévola Alves =

Brazilian content entertainer

- Born: Mariana Alves; 24 March 2004 (age 22); São Bernardo do Campo, São Paulo, Brazil
- Occupation: Digital influencer · Content creator
- Years active: 2015–present

Malévola Alves, stage name of Mariana Alves (São Bernardo do Campo, 24 March 2004), is a Brazilian digital influencer and content creator. She gained notoriety on TikTok and Instagram, where she produces content about fashion and her gender transition. She is also known for having participated in the reality show Rancho do Maia, hosted by comedian Carlinhos Maia. Her stage name "Malévola" is the Brazilian translation for the character name "Maleficent".

== Biography ==
Malévola Alves was born in São Bernardo do Campo on 24 March 2004, and started posting videos on the internet when she was 11 years old.

In January 2020, during a routine inspection and patrol, agents of the São Bernardo do Campo Municipal Civil Guard approached a group of transgender teenagers, including Alves. On that occasion, the authorities prevented the group from accessing the women's search line, claiming that their documents showed the sex assigned at birth and their birth names.

At age 18, Alves underwent gender-affirming surgeries.

In 2024, she was invited to participate in the reality show Rancho do Maia, hosted by comedian Carlinhos Maia.

In April 2024, during Easter, Alves posted a video on her social media of a chocolate egg delivery to socially vulnerable communities. In the video, a child approached the influencer's car asking for the sweets. In the video, she refused to hand them over to the child. This generated criticism on social media, which led the influencer to post an apology.

In July, she underwent a glottoplasty, sharing details about the surgery on social media.

=== Wicked play case ===
On 26 March 2025, while attending the musical Wicked at the Teatro Renault in São Paulo, Alves stated that a woman had verbally abused her, referring to her using male pronouns and the term "man."

The incident caused a commotion in the seating area and led to a temporary halt of the musical before the start of the second act. Audience members booed the woman and shouted in protest, demanding her removal from the theater. The theater's security team escorted her out. Members of the show's principal cast expressed their support for Alves. Following the incident, the woman disputed the allegations.

=== Beauty salon case ===
In 2026, Alves accused a beauty salon in Alphaville, São Paulo, of predatory pricing and commercial fraud. According to her, the final price set for a hair extension and coloring procedure underwent an exorbitant, arbitrary increase compared to the initial quote agreed upon in private conversations. The hairstylist in charge countered the accusations with technical statements and documentation, asserting that the additional costs stemmed from the volume of imported materials required for the influencer's hair extensions, and claiming that Alves was fully aware of the price lists beforehand.

Subsequently, influencer Sophia Florence—also known as "Soso Careca"—expressed support for the business, as did her partner, singer MC Paiva, and singer Jojo Todynho. Alves accused them of coordinating online attacks and making transphobic remarks against her. Todynho rebutted Alves's comments during a live stream, referring to her as a "woman who does not gestate". Todynho denied the allegations of transphobia.

A verbal altercation took place at a shopping center in São Paulo between Alves and the couple MC Paiva and Sophia Florence. Following the dispute, Alves retained legal counsel and formally announced her intention to file a civil lawsuit seeking compensation for pain and suffering, as well as a criminal complaint alleging transphobia, against Jojo Todynho, MC Paiva and the hairstylist.

=== Arrest in Egypt ===
On 20 October 2026, Alves was arrested in Egypt for alleged obscene behaviour and making gestures of a sexual nature. The arrest related to videos that the influencer and a friend had taken of themselves interacting with passengers on public transport while on holiday in Egypt.
