= Jezabel (TV series) =

Brazilian television series

- Genre: Telenovela
- Created by: Cristianne Fridman
- Written by: Alexandre Richard; Carla Piske; Fabiana Reis; Jaqueline Corrêa; Jussara Fazolo; Stephanie Martins; Vânia Matos
- Directed by: Alexandre Avancini
- Starring: Lidi Lisboa
- Country of origin: Brazil
- Original language: Portuguese
- No. of seasons: 1
- No. of episodes: 80

Production
- Camera setup: Multi-camera
- Production company: RecordTV

Original release
- Network: RecordTV
- Release: 23 April – 12 August 2019

Jezabel (English: Jezebel) is a Brazilian television series produced by RecordTV in partnership with the production company Formata Produções that premiered on 23 April 2019 and ended 12 August 2019. It is based on the story of biblical character Jezebel. The series stars Lidi Lisboa as the titular character.

== Plot ==
After an agreement between two kingdoms, a disguised Jezabel, princess of Phoenicia, marries Prince Acabe and becomes the most dangerous queen of Israel. Taking advantage of the weak and submissive profile of her husband, she starts to rule the kingdom with violence and manipulates everyone around her, calling herself a great priestess and divine spokeswoman, in addition to resorting to violence and public human sacrifices to show her power.

She has allies including her lover Hannibal, general of the Phenician army, and her best friend, Thanit, a vain and ambitious priestess, who influences Jezebel into even more barbaric plans. The queen's greatest enemy is the prophet Elias, who attempts to unmask her and remove the queen from power with the help of various allies inside as well as outside the royal palace. This causes Jezabel to hire the nymphet Dido to seduce Eliseu, disciple of Elias, to discover his plans. Also in the fight against the queen is Obadias, administrator of the palace who works as a spy for the prophets, and tries to hide them from their oppressors.

== Cast ==
=== Main ===
- Lidi Lisboa as Jezabel, Rainha de Israel
- André Bankoff as Acabe, King of Israel
- Mônica Carvalho as Thanit
- Iano Salomão as Elias
- Juan Alba as Obadias Rakesh
- Ronny Kriwat as Eliseu Yak
- Juliana Xavier as Dido
- Juliana Knust as Queila
- Timóteo Heiderick as Barzilai
- Rafael Sardão as Hannibal
- Sthefany Brito as Raquel Palhoça
- Guilherme Dellorto as Micaías
- Alexandre Slaviero as Baltazar
- Bernardo Velasco as Matheus
- Leonardo Miggiorin as Isaac
- Adriana Birolli as Aisha
- Hylka Maria as Getúlia
- Flávio Galvão as Nabote Vina
- Eduardo Lago as Phineas Yak
- Narjara Turetta as Dalila Yak
- Juliana Boller as Hannah Yak
- Victor Sparapane as Tadeu Vina
- Daniel Blanco as Abner Vina
- Henri Pagnocelli as Emanuel Palhoça
- Andréa Avancini as Yarin Palhoça
- Brendha Haddad as Anaid
- Juliana Schalch as Temina
- Daniel Erthal as Thiago
- Dudu Pelizzari as Kaleb
- Léo Cidade as Levi
- Bárbara Maia as Leah
- Ricardo Pavão as Pigmaleão
- Fernando Sampaio as Uriel
- Igor Cosso as Miguel
- Laís Pinho as Samira Rakesh
- Camila Mayrink as Joana Rakesh
- Fernanda Nizzato as Adama
- Pedro Lamin as Sidônio
- Aline Prado as Batnoam
- Alex Brasil as Jarbas
- André Bicudo as Yakir
- João Pedro Novaes as Adad
- Gabriel Felipe as Ezri
- Fábio Scalon as Ib
- Luckas Moura as Noam
- Willian Mello as Samuel

=== Guest stars ===
- Samara Felippo as Tany
- Talita Castro as Rebeca
- Beth Zalcman as Elza Vina
- Gutto Ordoz as Benyamin
- Andrey Lopes as Dov
- Armando Amaral as Gilad
- Cassio do Nascimento as Cadmo
- Edu Porto as Jaali
- Luciano Quirino as Etbaal
- Mario Hermeto as Joel
- Patrick D'Orlando as Tobias

== Ratings ==
Season	Timeslot (BRT/AMT)	Episodes	First aired		Last aired	
Season	Timeslot (BRT/AMT)	Episodes	Date	Viewers (in points)	Date	Viewers (in points)
1	Mon–Fri 8:45pm	80	23 April 2019	10	12 August 2019	9
