= Jojo Todynho =

Brazilian singer (born 1997)

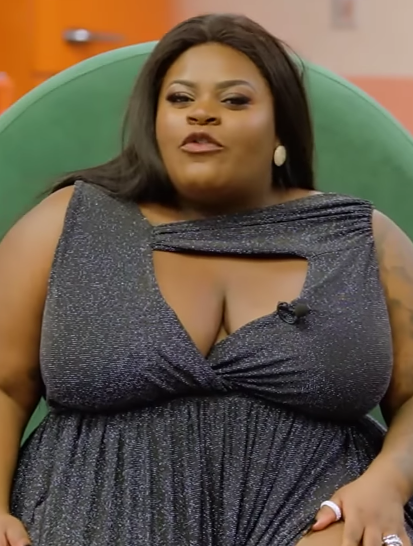
- Jojo in 2022
- Born: Jordana Gleise de Jesus Menezes; February 11, 1997 (age 29); Rio de Janeiro, Brazil
- Occupations: Singer, television presenter, entrepreneur
- Musical career
- Genres: Funk carioca, samba
- Instrument: Vocals
- Years active: 2017–present
- Label: Universal Music Group

Jordana Gleise de Jesus Menezes (born February 11, 1997), better known by her stage names Jojo Todynho and Jojo Maronttinni, is a Brazilian singer, television presenter, and entrepreneur. She gained national recognition with the funk carioca hit song "Que Tiro Foi Esse". In 2020, she was the winner of the 12th season of the reality show A Fazenda, broadcast by Record TV.

== Biography ==
Born and raised in Bangu, a neighborhood in the suburbs of Rio de Janeiro, Jojo hails from a modest family and was reared by her paternal grandmother, Rita Maria. During her childhood, she participated in the choir of a Baptist church and also took part in singing and dance performances at school. The artist lost her father at the age of ten, when he fell victim to a stray bullet while working as a security guard at a LAN house.

To help support her grandmother financially, Jordana began working early in her adolescence, holding positions such as telephone operator, cleaner, street vendor, caregiver for the elderly, nanny, playroom attendant at shopping malls, and ice cream seller. In pursuit of her independence, she moved to the neighborhood of Lapa at the age of twenty, where she lived in a rented studio apartment until early 2018.

She began her work on the internet, posting music videos on Facebook and maintaining her own YouTube channel, where she speaks openly about sex and romantic relationships. After gaining notoriety on YouTube, Todynho embarked on a musical career. In mid‑2017, she signed a contract with Universal Music to release her debut single, "Sentada Diferente," which did not achieve significant success. Around the same time, Todynho also made a guest appearance on the telenovela A Força do Querer, broadcast by TV Globo. Later that year, she appeared in the music video for Anitta's "Vai Malandra", which brought her widespread recognition online.

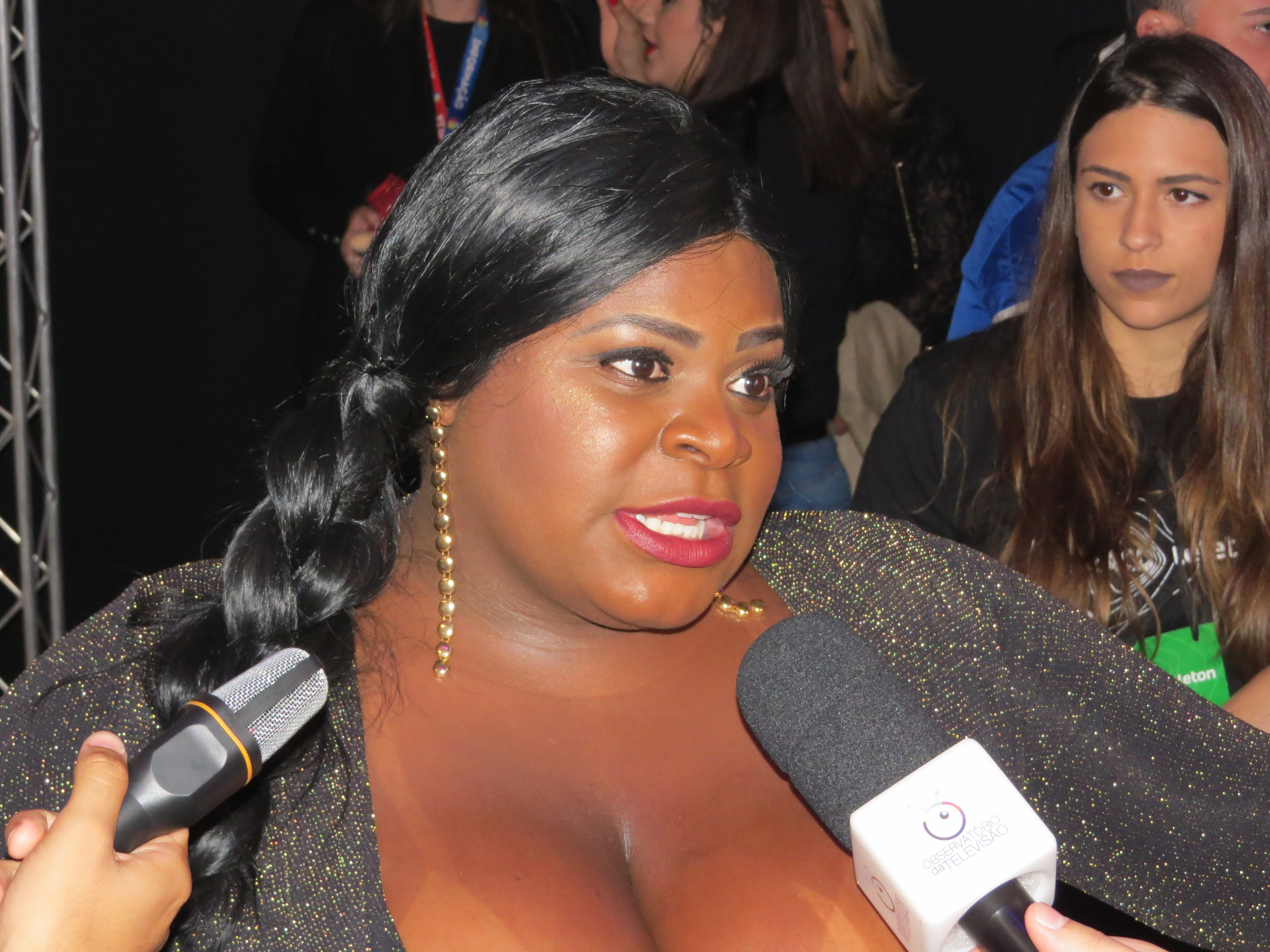
Jojo Todynho in 2018

In 2018, she gained national recognition after recording and releasing the funk carioca song "Que Tiro Foi Esse", which became a hit song shortly after its release. On September 7, 2020, Jojo was confirmed as a contestant on the twelfth season of the reality show A Fazenda, aired by Record TV. In the finale, held on December 17, Jojo was crowned champion of the reality show with 52.54% of the votes, winning a prize of R$1.5 million. In June 2021, Jojo made her debut as a host on the Globo's entertainment channel Multishow, with the talk show Jojo Nove e Meia. In February 2022, she was confirmed as one of the participants in the 19th edition of the talent show Dança dos Famosos, finishing the competition in 6th place.

In 2024, during the municipal election in Rio de Janeiro, she began to publicly declare her support for former President Jair Bolsonaro and to distance herself from the LGBTQ community, with which she had always maintained a strong connection. In response, activist Agripino Magalhães Júnior accused her of being opportunistic, stating that she "used the LGBTQIA+ population as a stepping stone. Now that she no longer needs them, she has taken off the mask." He also filed a petition with the Public Prosecutor's Office of Rio de Janeiro to prevent her from performing the song "Arrasou Viado" henceforth.

As a consequence of her stances, especially in videos where she appeared shouting and swearing, Avon terminated its contract with her. Upon learning of the termination of the partnership, Todynho called for a boycott of the brand, receiving support from Bolsonaro-supporting influencers. Jojo was also disinvited from São Paulo Fashion Week, a fashion event she was scheduled to participate in. Subsequently, she lost her position as muse of the Carnival at Mocidade Independente de Padre Miguel and therefore did not participate in the group's parade in 2025. After the matter gained media attention, outlets reported that Jojo's career was facing cancellation.

In 2026, Todynho faced accusations of transphobia after calling influencer Malévola Alves a "woman who does not gestate."

== Discography ==
=== Singles ===
==== As lead artist ====
- "Sentada Diferente" (2017)
- "Que Tiro Foi Esse" (2018)
- "Vou com Tudo" (2018)
- "Arrasou Viado" (2018)
- "Rebolarizando" (with Pocah and DJ Lindão; 2018)
- "Joga Sem Parar" (with Kevin O Chris; 2018)
- "Acordei Gostosa" (2019)
- "Achas" (with Preto Show and Blaya; 2020)
- "Devo Tá na Moda" (2020)
- "De Onde Eu Venho" (2022)
- "Bangu" (2022)

==== As guest artist ====
- "Perdendo a Mão" (Seakret and feat. Anitta and Jojo Maronttinni; 2018)
- "Gin" (Funk Samba Club feat. Jojo Maronttinni; 2019)
- "La Chapa Que Vibran" (La Materialista feat. Jojo Maronttinni and Belinda; 2019)
- "Pesou o Rolê" (Harmonia do Samba feat. Jojo Maronttinni; 2021)

== Awards and nominations ==
Year	Awards	Category	Nominee	Result	Ref.
2018	MTV Millennial Awards	Crush of the Year	Jojo Maronttinni	Nominated	
2018	MTV Millennial Awards	Anthem of the Year	"Que Tiro Foi Esse"	Nominated	
2018	MTV Millennial Awards	Meme of the Year	"Que Tiro Foi Esse"	Won	
2018	Prêmio Jovem Brasileiro	Hit of the Year	"Que Tiro Foi Esse"	Nominated	
2018	Meus Prêmios Nick	Hit of the Year	"Que Tiro Foi Esse"	Nominated	
2018	Meus Prêmios Nick	New Musical Artist	Jojo Maronttinni	Nominated	
2020	Splash Awards	Best Reality Show Participant	A Fazenda 12	Nominated	
2020	Prêmio Área VIP	Best Reality Show Participant	A Fazenda 12	Nominated	
2021	MTV Millennial Awards	Reality Show Royalty	A Fazenda 12	Nominated	
