= Compasso UOL =

Brazilian IT outsourcing firm

Compass UOL
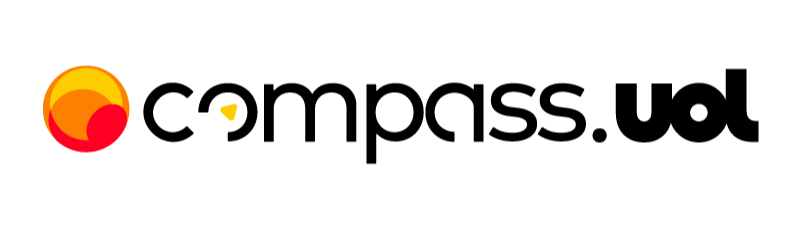
- Industry: Digital Industry, IT Outsourcing
- Founded: (1996)
- Headquarters: São Paulo, Brazil
- Owner: UOL

Compasso UOL is an Universo Online Group-owned IT outsourcing firm. The firm has a staff of 1,300 employees and operates throughout Brazil.

Before 2020, Compasso UOL was named UOL DIVEO, but was fragmented in Compasso UOL and UD Tecnologia (former division that was sold and owns four data centers: three in the city of São Paulo and one in Barueri).

Gil Torquato is the firm's CEO.

== Operations ==
In December 2010, UOL Group purchased Diveo Broadband Network, an American technology outsourcing firm established in 1996, for R$693.5 million via its subsidiaries UOL Host Data and DHC Outsourcing. In the same year, UOL Group merged UOL Host Data, DHC Outsourcing, and Diveo Broadband network into UOL DIVEO.

UOL DIVEO provides infrastructure and IT cloud computing outsourcing, as well as application services, managed security services, payment processes, business integration solutions, customized Oracle services, e-commerce services and platforms, and capital markets and telecommunications services.

== Subsidiaries ==
In March 2010, UOL Group purchased Tech4B, a Quality Assurance and software performance firm. UOL DIVEO acquired Solvo, an environment and technology infrastructure managing consulting firm in March 2012. In February of the following year, UOL DIVEO purchased Compasso Informática, a consulting and technology firm that specializes in Oracle Middleware. In May, UOL DIVEO launched UOL DIVEO Broker, a subsidiary company that serves capital markets with an integrated platform in compliance with the norms and standards of BM&F Bovespa.
