= Ull =

Ull or ULL may refer to:

== Organisations ==
- SK Ull, a Norwegian Nordic skiing club
- Non-Party List (German: Überparteiliche Liste Liechtenstein), a short-lived political party in Liechtenstein
- Ullensaker/Kisa IL, a Norwegian sports club
- University of La Laguna, Canary Islands, Spain
- University of Louisiana at Lafayette, United States

== Other uses ==
- Ullr or Ull, a Germanic god
- Ull (Greyhawk), a fictional state
- Ullatan language, an extinct Dravidian language
- Ulleskelf railway station, England
- Upper Level Low, a cyclone with associated cold air at high altitude
- Ureteroscopic laser lithotripsy, a surgical procedure to remove kidney stones
