= Banda Vingadora =

- Origin: Itabuna, Bahia, Brazil
- Genres: Axé music Arrocha; Pagode baiano Funk melody
- Years active: 2014–present
- Labels: Independente (2014—2015); Sony Music (2016—present)
- Members: Tays Reis; Dan Rodrigues; Celso Otoniel; Murillo Santos; Davison Lopes; Murillo Santos; Paulo Victor; Josenel Santos; Manoel Junior
- Website: https://www.vingadora.com.br/

Banda Vingadora is a Brazilian musical group formed in 2014 in the city of Itabuna, Bahia.

== History ==
The group formed in February 2014, began his career in the traditional festivals of the interior of Bahia, called "walls of sound" where was the favorite band of these festivals the band managed to make great success in bars and at parties from Itabuna. The group just released her first music video in December 2014, with the song Fazer o Crau and became known in the Northeast with the song A Minha Mãe Deixa, which was chosen as the anthem of the feast of Saint John in 2015 and that gained even more popularity after Tays Reis vocalist singing alongside the singer Ivete Sangalo.

In the rest of Brazil achieved fame with the hit Paredão Metralhadora, considered the music of the Carnival of 2016. Success on YouTube, the video-clip of "Paredão Metralhadora" was inspired by the film Mad Max and his investment was R$200.000. The recording of the music video took 17 hours of recording. The song had the choreography created by Fit Dance Academy (of Salvador) and had the Agency's California production (producer of Salvador) and help to disseminate Hugo Gloss (a blogger brasiliense) and the music video that was posted on YouTube on 17 December 2015 day had more than 50 million views. Paredão Metralhadoratook first place among the songs heard in the Vagalume site Top, ahead of songs such as Hello British singer Adele. The song was also one of the most heard in the streaming service Napster. The costumes inspired by the song Paredão Metralhadora were the most searched for revelers to the Corso of Teresina, the largest parade of floats in the world. According to Crowley, a scouting organization, the song Paredão Metralhadora is already being played on several radios of Brazil, mainly in the following places: Triângulo Mineiro, Fortaleza, Rio de Janeiro and Vitoria. The band received the award in the category revelation Carnival YouTube, the band gained a unique music video produced by YouTube during the Carnival of Salvador de 2016.

The group is known for mixing elements of axé funk and one of its members play the violin, unusual instrument in these genres. One of the Group's debut album was released under the title the Solo do Poder containing 18 tracks and the album was really listened to and downloaded on the internet, another debut album Vem Ne Mim and containing 12 tracks. The album Som do Paredão features Tierry on the song Sobe No paredão. In the second half of 2015 the band stayed with the tickets to their sold-out shows. His first DVD titled identity was released in January 2016, with a circulation of 80.000 copies, the recording took place in June 2015 in the town of Ibicuí (BA) to an audience of 20.000 people. On 12 January 2016, the band signed with Sony Music in Rio de Janeiro and the forecast released by the label an album in the spring of 2016. Sony Music will reissue the album Vem Ne Mim. On 9 February 2016 was released the winners of the prize Trophy Band TV Folia and Banda Vingadora won this award in the category "Revelation". On 11 February 2016 was released by Bahia TV the result of music search winning Bahia Folia and the result was Paredão Metralhadora.

== Current members ==
- Tays Reis: Vocals. Born on 13 January 1995, in the city of Ilhéus, but settled in Itabuna. She began taking singing and guitar lessons at Planet Music School, and began her music career 13 years ago, singing in bars. She participated in the band Garota Faceira and has studied journalism.
- Dan Rodrigues: Violin
- Celso Otoniel: Guitar
- Davison Lopes: Keyboard
- Murillo Santos: Percussion
- Paulo Victor: Drums
- Josenel Santos: Bass Guitar
- Manoel Junior: Percussion

== Discography ==
Álbuns
Ano	Título	Mídia
	Som de Paredão	EP
	Vem Ne Mim	
	O Solo do Poder	CD
2016	Identidade	DVD

== Awards ==
Ano	Premiação	Categoria	Resultado	Ref.
2016	Prêmio YouTube Carnaval	Revelação	Won	
2016	Pesquisa Bahia Folia	Música do Carnaval ("Paredão Metralhadora")	Won	
2016	Troféu Band TV Folia	Revelação	Won	
