= Universo Online =

Brazilian web content, products and services company

Universo Online S.A
- Type: Sociedade Anônima
- Industry: Online service provider
- Founded: 1996; 30 years ago
- Headquarters: São Paulo, Brazil
- Key people: Rômulo Dias, (Chairman & CEO)
- Products: Online media
- Revenue: ▲US$ 95.4 million (2021)
- Net income: ▼US$ 82.4 million (2021)
- Number of employees: 1001–5000
- Parent: Grupo Folha
- Subsidiaries: PagSeguro; UOL DIVEO; UOL HOST
- Website: uol.com.br

Universo Online (Portuguese: 'Universe Online'; known by the acronym UOL) is a Brazilian web content, products, and services company. It belongs to Grupo Folha enterprise.

UOL is the world's largest Portuguese speaking portal, featuring more than 1,000 news sources and 7 million pages. The portal provides website hosting, data storage, publicity dealing, online payments, and security systems. It also holds more than 300,000 online shops, 23 million buyers, and 4 million vendors in its portals.

In 2012, UOL was the fifth most visited website in Brazil. According to IBOPE Nielsen Online, UOL is Brazil's largest internet portal with more than 50 million unique visitors and 6.7 billion page views every month.

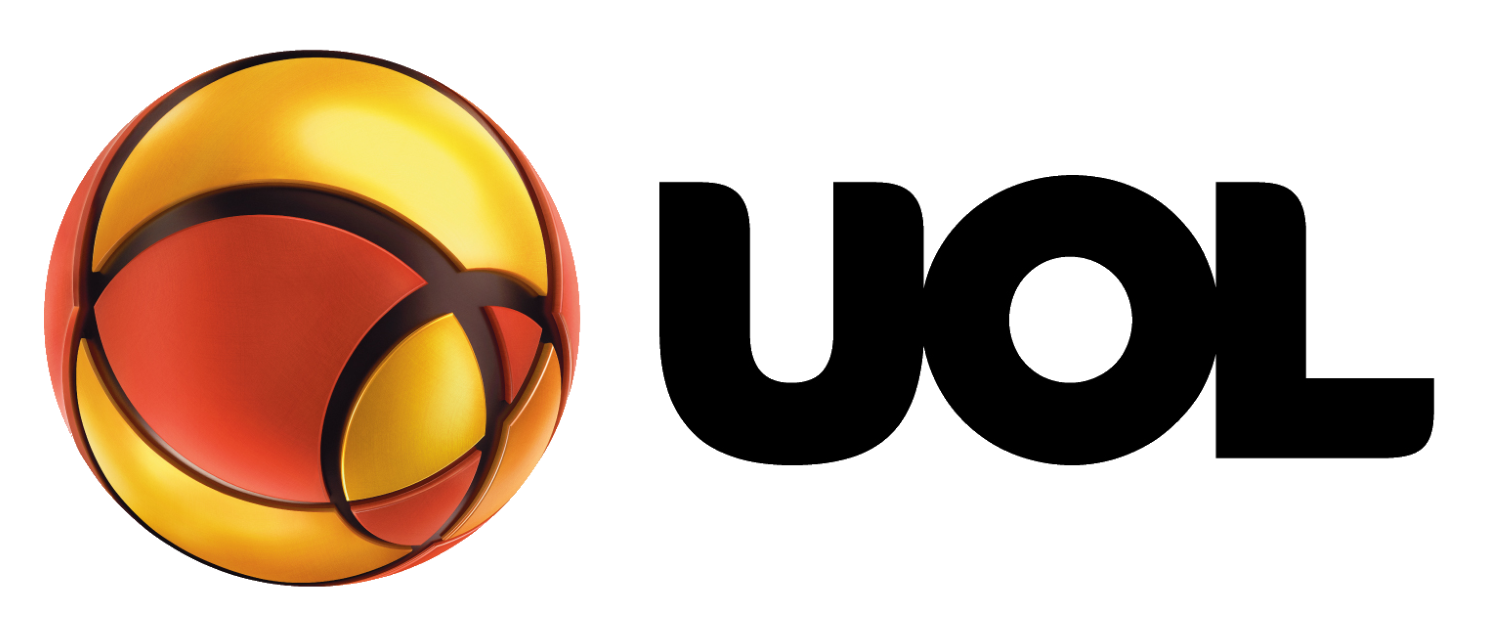
Logo used until 2023

== History ==
UOL was established by Grupo Folha on 28 April 1996. After seven months, UOL joined the portal Brasil Online (BOL) from Editora Abril; however, Editora Abril does not own shares in BOL anymore. Portugal Telecom had 29% of UOL, but sold its shares to Folhapar, a company controlled by businessman João Alves de Queiroz Filho, of Hypermarcas holding, in 2010. Grupo Folha and Folhapar are UOL's main shareholders. UOL won more than 100 awards as one of Brazil's largest online portal since 1996.

=== Early years ===
On 28 April 1996, UOL went online. In July 1996, it put online an operation with a 2 megabit per second base connection. In August, UOL launched a web provider in the cities of Greater São Paulo and Rio de Janeiro coupled with email accounts and the setup of browser Netscape version 2.2 in Portuguese.

In 1997, UOL created a series of forums, focus groups, and surveys, as well as the online version of the encyclopedia Nova Enciclopédia Ilustrada Folha. UOL also launched TV UOL (their video sharing platform), with content based on music videos, interviews, and movie trailers, and AcessoNet, a company that provides larger Internet access in Brazil's major cities. UOL also expanded its connection capability to 20 megabits and received the award of best web provider and Internet users favorite's website of Informática Exame magazine in 1997.

UOL absorbed the subscribers of Internet provider Compuserve in Brazil in a move that increased its connection capability to 74 megabits. UOL launched UOL Discador, a feature that eliminated lack of Internet access in case the network get busy in 1998.

In the following year UOL reached more than 350,000 subscribers and released UOL Educação portal (UOL Education) and also Placar UOL Esporte, which presents scores of soccer, tennis, volley, basketball, and F1 events all over Brazil and the world. In the same period UOL launched an unlimited web access platform, a Bible online version and started to offer free e-mail hosting via Brasil Online (BOL), a new firm of UOL group. The company also expanded its online operations with portals in Argentina, Mexico, Venezuela, Chile and United States of America.

=== 2000s ===
In 2000, UOL launched its portal in Spain, established a partnership with Embratel to expand its internet connection to 1.2 Gigabyte per second and released Rádio UOL (UOL Radio), which initially offered a series of music shows, new releases of music and playlists creation. In the same year, UOL launched a partnership with financial website Patagon in a move that secured US$8 million in funding to disclose financial information on UOL portals.

In 2002, Mercado Livre became UOL INC's exclusive partner for auctions in branches UOL Brazil, UOL Colombia, UOL Sinectis and Brasil Online (BOL). In the same year, UOL reached the mark of 5 million visitors per month, 1.5 million subscribers and started a live broadcast of reality show Casa de Artistas 2.

UOL went on to supply more than 560 Brazilian cities with Internet access. Afterwards it released the UOL Business channel providing information to corporations and executives and also channels for Brazilian celebrities such as Leonardo, Raul Gil and Sandy & Junior in 2003.

In 2005, UOL made its IPO on Bolsa de Valores de São Paulo (BOVESPA). However, the firm went back private in 2012. UOL created the social network UOLK in 2005, which was online until 2008. In the following year, UOL established a partnership with BBC for a website teaching English. UOL also launched a partnership with VideoLog, a video sharing portal. That endeavor ended in 2010.

In 2007, UOL established a partnership with Google to improve its search engine and also created UOL Downloads, a website downloads of websites and apps. In the same year, UOL updated the mobile version of its portal, launched a partnership with online game distributor Level Up!Games and launched UOL Economia (UOL Economics), a portal featuring calculators, simulators, and quotations.

In 2008 UOL launched Zumo, a technology blog written by journalists that test products and report on Brazilian tech market. UOL also bought Digiwerb, a web and server hosting firm, and launched UOL Mais, a portal offering unlimited space for sharing videos, photos, texts, and, audio recordings.

UOL also purchased website and server hosting firm Insite, created an investment simulator in Bolsa de Valores de São Paulo (BOVESPA) and launched a new version of Rádio UOL in 2009.

=== 2010s ===
In December 2010, via its subsidiaries UOL Host Date and DHC Outsourcing, UOL bought Diveo Broadband Network, an American technology outsourcing company.

In the following year, UOL launched mobile apps for news to devices iPhone and iPad, GigaMail and UOL Cursos Online, a portal that offers free courses from distance for languages, formal education, extensions and post-graduation degrees.

To extend UOL's position outside of Brazil, UOL acquired BoaCompra in 2011, Brazil's largest digital goods payments company specializing in monetizing online games in emerging markets. The business unit, now called UOL BoaCompra, works with more than 400 video game companies including Electronic Arts, Valve, Smilegate and Ubisoft; providing localized payment coverage for more than 5,000 online games across Latin America, Spain, Portugal and Turkey.

In 2012, UOL expanded its partnership with Discovery Kids, released an online English course, announced UOL Women portal and also introduced an app on Formula 1. In the same year, UOL released UOL Viagens, a portal with tips, routes and news on trips. UOL renewed its portal layout and acquired the hosting of Turma da Mônica portal in 2013.

In 2014, UOL launched a mobile app for its chat and was appointed by a research of Ibope Conecta the website that most helps São Paulo Internet Users to find information. In the same year, partnerships were established with Rede TV in order to host its website and with Clarín, one of Argentina's largest newspapers, to disclose UOL's content in its own Portuguese language portal.

=== 2020s ===
In December 2020, UOL launched the Splash Awards, celebrating the best works and celebrities of the year on the internet, music, television and pop culture in general. The first edition included more than 20 categories and winners were chosen based on a public-voted process.

== Operations ==
UOL includes:

- UOL Cliques, ads and publicity portal.
- Radar de Descontos, group buying portal.
- Emprego Certo, jobs portal.
- Shopping UOL, online price comparing tool.
- UOL Segurança Online, online safety firm.
- Universidade UOL, online education portal.
- UOL Revelação Digital, online photo developing portal.
- Toda Oferta, buying and selling portal.
- UOL Wi-Fi, unlimited wireless broadband Internet access.
- PagSeguro, e-commerce tool in which shops and people can pay and cash online payments.
- UOL Mais, portal with unlimited space for videos, photos, audio and texts.
- UOL HOST, hosting and cloud computing firm.
- UOL Assistência Técnica, technical support services for computers, tablets, and smartphones.
- UOL DIVEO, online IT outsourcing firm.
- UOL Afiliados, membership program for subscribers and non-subscribers. The program pays UOL associate that remunerates websites and blogs that disclose ads. Each associate receives a quantity per clicks received in each ad or signature conversion.
- Ingresso.com, an online movie and event ticket merchant acquired from Fandango Media in 2021.

== See also ==
- List of internet service providers in Brazil
