= UOL HOST =

Brazilian website hosting and cloud computing firm

UOL HOST S.A.
- Type: Private
- Industry: Internet hosting service
- Founded: 2008, São Paulo, Brazil
- Headquarters: São Paulo, Brazil
- Area served: Brazil
- Owner: Universo Online
- Website: www.uolhost.com.br

UOL HOST is a website hosting and cloud computing firm that it is owned and operated by Universo Online (UOL) Holding. UOL HOST's head office is based in São Paulo. Davi M. Mello is UOL HOST's director.

== History ==
UOL HOST was established in 2008. From 2008 to 2009, UOL HOST purchased the hosting firms Plug In, SouthTech, Digiweb, and CreativeHOST. In 2009, UOL HOST bought Insite, the fourth largest website hosting firm in Brazil. In the same year, UOL HOST obtained the Info Exame award in the hosting category.

The following year, UOL HOST and DHC Outsourcing paid R$693.5 million for the American outsourcing company Diveo Broadband Network. Later that year, UOL HOST started Microsoft Office based apps as well as an app for the automation of law firms using cloud computing technology. This app was named Painel do Advogado (Lawyer's Panel).

UOL HOST established a partnership with Traffic Sports and was the 2011 Copa América's official host. In 2012, the firm started a cloud computing service targeting server management. In 2013, UOL HOST sponsored the automobile racer Átila Abreu at Stock Car championship.

In 2014, UOL HOST introduced UOL Cloud Gerenciado, a cloud computing and server monitoring solution targeting small to medium-sized businesses, as well as information technology professionals and an e-mail marketing tool.

Also in 2014, UOL HOST released its Academia UOL HOST portal, which compiles news, e-books, infographics, articles and tips on e-commerce, digital marketing, cloud computing and management for information technology professionals and entrepreneurs. UOL HOST also released Site Pronto, a tool in which entrepreneurs and companies can create, customize and update a website. Furthermore, the firm established a partnership with Google in order to provide management of Google Adwords sponsored links.
