= Biel (singer) =

Brazilian singer

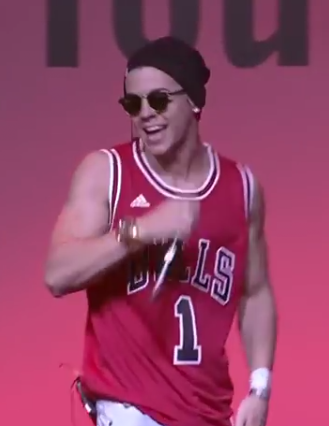

Background information
- Born: Gabriel Araújo Marins Rodrigues; 20 March 1996 (age 30); Lorena, São Paulo, Brazil
- Genres: Funk ostentação; pop
- Occupation: Singer
- Instrument: Vocals
- Years active: 2013–present
- Label: Warner Music Brazil

Gabriel Araújo Marins Rodrigues (born March 20, 1996), better known by the stage name Biel, is a Brazilian singer. After achieving online success, he was signed to Warner Music in April 2015. He released his EP Biel and had a string of hits, winning Meus Prêmios Nick Award as a "Revelação Musical" (musical revelation) of the year. He released his album Juntos Vamos Além in 2016.

== Career ==
Gabriel was born in Lorena, São Paulo. He is the eldest son of Sérgio Ricardo Marins Rodrigues and of lawyer and former DJ Eliziane Silva Araújo.

At 12, he began to show interest in a musical career and became a model, DJ and dancer. At 16, he performed as MC Biel in clubs. In 2013, Biel, he started as an independent funk carioca artist in the styles "funk ostentação" and "funk sedução" and was often dubbed a "Brazilian Justin Bieber". In 2014, he found internet blog series WeBiel. Once signed to Warner Music in 2015, he removed MC from his stage name, to perform funk and pop music under the mononym Biel. The single "Demorô" from his self-titled EP Biel became a commercial success followed up by an even more successful single "Química" also from Biel. His studio album Juntos Vamos Além is released in April 2016 on Warner.

== Discography ==
=== Albums ===
- 2016: Juntos Vamos Além

=== EPs ===
- 2015: Biel

=== Singles ===
List of singles
| Title | Year | Peak chart positions | Álbum |
| Title | Year | BRA | Álbum |
|---|---|---|---|
| "Ela É Baladeira" | 2013 | — | Non-album single |
| "Tô Tirando Onda" | 2014 | — | MC Biel |
| "Pimenta" | 2014 | — | MC Biel |
| "Boquinha" | 2015 | — | Biel |
| "Demorô" | 2015 | — | Biel |
| "Química" | 2015 | 56 | Juntos Vamos Além |
| "Melhor Assim" (feat. Ludmilla) | 2016 | 53 | Juntos Vamos Além |
| "Ninguém Segura Ela" | 2016 | — | Non-album single |
| "Trust You" | 2018 | — | Non-album single |
| "Deixa Essa Mina Dançar" | 2018 | — | Non-album single |
| "Yo Te Lo Doy" | 2019 | — | Non-album single |
| "Dejalo" | 2019 | — | Non-album single |
| "Cicatriz" (with Luck Muzik) | 2020 | — | Non-album single |
| "Iludido" (feat. Ana Catarina) | 2020 | — | Non-album single |
| "Plantão" (com Negão da Bl) | 2020 | — | Non-album single |
| "Intro." | 2020 | — | Non-album single |
| "Melhor do Baile" | 2020 | — | Non-album single |
| "Artigo 157" (with Tays Reis) | 2021 | — | Non-album single |
| "Ela Maltrata" | 2021 | — | Non-album single |

== Filmography ==
- 2014–present: (personal web blog series)

== Awards and nominations ==
| Year | Award | Category | Nomination | Result | Ref. |
|---|---|---|---|---|---|
| 2015 | Meus Prêmios Nick | Revelation | Biel | Won | |
| 2015 | Meus Prêmios Nick | Gato do Ano | Biel | Nominated | |
| 2015 | Geração Z Awards | National Revelation | Biel | Nominated | |
| 2016 | Meus Prêmios Nick | Favourite Brazilian Artist | Biel | Nominated | |
